= Mothertongue (album) =

Studio album by Nico Muhly
- Released: May 26, 2008
- Studio: Looking Glass (New York City); Greenhouse (Reykjavík)
- Length: 49:01
- Label: Bedroom Community
- Producer: Valgeir Sigurðsson

Nico Muhly chronology
Speaks Volumes (2006)	Mothertongue (2008)	I Drink the Air Before Me (2010)

Mothertongue is a studio album by American composer and musician Nico Muhly. It was released on May 26, 2008, through Bedroom Community. It received generally favorable reviews from critics.

== Background ==
Mothertongue is Nico Muhly's second solo studio album, following Speaks Volumes (2006). It contains three suites: "Mothertongue", "Wonders", and "The Only Tune". It features contributions from vocalists Abigail Fischer (on "Mothertongue"), Helgi Hrafn Jónsson (on "Wonders"), and Sam Amidon (on "The Only Tune").

The album was originally released on May 26, 2008, through Valgeir Sigurðsson's Icelandic record label Bedroom Community. In the United States, it was released on July 22, 2008, through Brassland Records.

== Critical reception ==
Professional ratings
Aggregate scores
Source	Rating
Metacritic	78/100
Review scores
Source	Rating
AllMusic	3.5/5 stars
The A.V. Club	B+
Cokemachineglow	82%
Now	4/5
The Phoenix	3.5/4 stars
Pitchfork	5.1/10
PopMatters	7/10
Spin	6/10

According to the review aggregator Metacritic, Mothertongue received "generally favorable reviews" based on a weighted average score of 78 out of 100 from 10 critic scores.

Dan Raper of PopMatters stated, "The three suites on the album do have a fidgety motion, but there are also moments of spare beauty." He added, "But these works aren't large-scale in the way that Philip Glass' work is, and each idea is dealt with in a mode that shares more with indie pop than classical music." Alexandra Savvides of Cyclic Defrost stated, "Mothertongue is an incredibly ambitious work, and its beauty is able to shine through from Muhly's meticulous layering of complex voices, instrumentation and context." Michael Patrick Brady of The Phoenix commented that "Muhly is a perfect ambassador for a new generation of classical composers — his love of music knows no bounds or limitations." Conrad Amenta of Cokemachineglow stated, "Mothertongue oscillates between the comfort/terror of singularities and excitement/terror of potentialities, but the possibilities this duality affords for Muhly's future work are frankly exhilarating."

=== Accolades ===
Year-end lists for Mothertongue
Publication	List	Rank	Ref.
Pitchfork	Albums of the Year: Honorable Mention	—	

== Track listing ==
All tracks are written by Nico Muhly.

Mothertongue track listing
No.	Title	Length
1.	"Mothertongue: I. Archive"	5:49
2.	"Mothertongue: II. Shower"	4:18
3.	"Mothertongue: III. Hress"	3:53
4.	"Mothertongue: IV. Monster"	4:43
5.	"Wonders: I. New Things & New Tidings"	5:56
6.	"Wonders: II. The Devil Appear'd in the Shape of a Man"	5:33
7.	"Wonders: III. A Complaint Against Thomas Weelkes"	3:18
8.	"The Only Tune: I. Two Sisters"	4:30
9.	"The Only Tune: II. The Old Mill Pond"	6:24
10.	"The Only Tune: III. The Only Tune"	4:47
Total length:		49:01

== Personnel ==
Credits adapted from liner notes.

- Nico Muhly – programming, keyboards, celesta (5–7), percussion (8–10)
- Valgeir Sigurðsson – electric bass (1–4), programming, production, recording, mixing
- Abigail Fischer – mezzo-soprano vocals (1–4)
- Matthías Nardeau – oboe (1–4)
- Una Sveinbjarnardóttir – violin (1–4)
- Zbigniew Dubik – violin (1–4)
- Andres Kleina – violin (1–4)
- Þórarinn Már Baldursson – viola (1–4)
- Monica Abendroth – harp (1–4, 8–10)
- Helgi Hrafn Jónsson – vocals (5–7), trombone (5–7)
- Árni Heimir Ingólfsson – harpsicord (5–7)
- Sam Amidon – vocals (8–10), banjo (8–10), guitar (8–10)
- Nadia Sirota – viola (8–10)
- Ben Frost – bass programming (8–10)
- Adam Thompson – additional recording
- Chris Thompson – additional recording
- Buchanan-Smith LLC – artwork
- Michael Schmelling – cover photography
- Jason Frank Rothenberg – "Iceland, 2003" photography
