= Geoffrey Hudson (composer) =

American composer and choral conductor (born 1967)

Geoffrey Hudson (born 1967) is an American composer and choral conductor.

== Early life and education ==
Geoffrey Hudson was born in Lansing, Michigan in 1967. He attended Oberlin College, where he studied with Richard Hoffmann and graduated with degrees in American history and composition in 1989. Hudson earned a master's degree from the New England Conservatory, studying under Malcolm Peyton.

== Professional career and notable works ==
In 2002 Hudson composed First Among Equals, a concerto for viola and chamber ensemble, which was premiered by the Oberlin Contemporary Ensemble. It was later featured at the 32nd International Viola Congress.

The following year, the American Composers Forum selected Hudson to participate in the Continental Harmony project. Hudson collaborated with the North Dakota Museum of Art and Greater Grand Forks Symphony Orchestra to produce Meeting Ground, a concerto for string quartet and orchestra, which blends powwow music of the northern plains Indians and the European symphonic tradition.

In 2006 Hudson composed The Bug Opera. The opera was intended for young audiences, and tells the story of a mosquito who doesn't want to drink blood, and a caterpillar who's reluctant to metamorphosize.

From 2007 to 2014 Hudson created The Quartet Project, a collection of progressive string quartets. The Quartet Project, has been performed by notable American string quartets, such as the Borromeo, Parker, Brooklyn Rider, Jupiter, Miró, Chiara, and Apple Hill quartets, and the International Society for Contemporary Music’s “World New Music Days” in Vancouver featured a suite from The Quartet Project in 2017.

Hudson's most widely reviewed work to date, A Passion for the Planet, was premiered by the Illuminati Vocal Arts Ensemble in June 2019. The libretto addresses climate change, attempting to build an emotional connection between the audience and the impending realities of climate science. In June 2020, the Smithsonian Institution's National Museum of Natural History hosted a web panel on the arts and climate change, featuring Hudson in conversation with author and activist Bill McKibben.
