= The Quartet Project =

The Quartet Project, created by composer Geoffrey Hudson from 2007-2014, is a collection of new music for graduated string quartets composed in six volumes. Modeled on Béla Bartók's Mikrokosmos, and meant for musicians of all ages, it offers modern music for students' chamber studies beginning in Volume 1 with introductory pieces that are "easy contemporary music for string quartet", and become increasingly more difficult though Volume 6.

The Quartet Project provides music which is "contemporary in sound and technique (i.e. including the use of glissando, pizzicato, and modern harmonies)" early in players' studies, and is structured to accompany players as they advance to concert-level performance.

"Each of the six volumes contains approximately 25 minutes of music, divided into two types of pieces: miniatures and full-length performance quartets. The miniatures are typically less than a minute long and focus on a particular aspect of ensemble playing. The full-length quartets use the materials covered in the miniatures to create multi-movement string quartets suitable for performance. Volumes 1, 2, and 3 include an optional third violin part, which can be used in place of a viola. The Quartet Project encompasses approximately 2 ½ hours of new music for string quartet."

The Quartet Project has been workshopped and performed at, among other places, Community Music Works (Providence, RI), Drake University's Community School of Music (Des Moines, IA), the Greater Grand Forks Symphony Orchestra (Grand Forks, ND), Indian Hill Music (Littleton, MA), the MacPhail Center for Music (Minneapolis, MN), Greenwood Music Camp in Cummington, Massachusetts, and the Third Street Music School's Chamber Music Program in New York City.

== Music ==
Selections include:

Beginner Miniatures (From Volumes 1 and 2)

- Digital world (0-0-1-1-0-0), performance by Brooklyn Rider in the July 2013 Quartet Project Challenge.
- Slow motion river, performance by returning judges the Chiara String Quartet in the April 2013 Quartet Project Challenge.
- While away, performance by the Miró String Quartet in the February 2013 Quartet Project Challenge.
- Brass echoes, performance by the Parker Quartet in the October 2012 Quartet Project Challenge.

Intermediate Miniatures (From Volumes 3 and 4)

- Doo-wop, performance by Brooklyn Rider in July 2013 Quartet Project Challenge.
- Things you can do with your boots on, performance by returning judges, the Chiara String Quartet in the April 2013 Quartet Project Challenge.
- Hijinks, performance by the Miró String Quartet in the February 2013 Quartet Project Challenge.
- Swagger, performance by the Parker Quartet in the October 2012 Quartet Project Challenge.

Advanced Miniatures (From Volumes 5 and 6)

- Elegy, performance by Brooklyn Rider in July 2013 Quartet Project Challenge.
- Caper, performance by returning judges, the Chiara String Quartet in the April 2013 Quartet Project Challenge.
- Lunging, performance by the Miró String Quartet in the February 2013 Quartet Project Challenge.
- Swing for the fences, performance by the Parker Quartet in the October 2012 Quartet Project Challenge.

Additional Examples:

- Volume I: Four views of a simple tune and Clang factor
- Volume II: Circular song and Widening circle
- Volume III: Quadricycle and Flirt's waltz
- Volume IV: Broken lines and Sevens
- Volume V: Starting point and Lullaby
- Volume VI: Hang time and Compulsion

== Workshop partners ==
The Quartet Project tested its music with string students and faculty coaches in workshop settings hosted by its partner organizations, followed by a mini-residency with composer Geoffrey Hudson. The following organizations have hosted Quartet Project workshops: Community Music Works (Providence, RI), Drake University's Community School of Music (Des Moines, IA), the Greater Grand Forks Symphony Orchestra (Grand Forks, ND), Indian Hill Music (Littleton, MA), the MacPhail Center for Music (Minneapolis, MN), and the Third Street Music School Settlement (New York, NY).

== Quartet project challenges ==
Quartetville is a virtual meeting place for string players of all abilities. The Quartetville website has been using Quartet Project miniatures to develop a Quartet Project Challenge concept. This concept represents a series of free, world-wide online masterclasses for players of all ages and abilities. Quartetville seeks to expand the Challenges to identify and use appropriate level quartet pieces from the complete string quartet repertory in order to offer young quartets entry points into playing string quartets. In the Challenges, young quartets learn directly from high level professionals in a free, online environment.

Quartet Project Challenge have been hosted by the following professional quartets:

- Brooklyn Rider
- The Chiara String Quartet
- The Miró Quartet
- the Parker Quartet
- Artaria String Quartet

== Volume dedications ==
Communities have come together to dedicate Volumes of the Quartet Project to master teachers:

- Volume III: dedicated to Sally Robinson Bagg, music and cello teacher at the Smith Campus School and director of junior Greenwood Music Camp in Cummington, MA from 1983 to 2012.
- Volume IV: dedicated to Marylou Speaker Churchill, long-time principal second violin of the Boston Symphony Orchestra who joined the New England Conservatory Preparatory School faculty in 1981.
- Volume V: dedicated to Norman Fischer, founding member of the Concord String Quartet, formerly on the faculty of Dartmouth College and the Oberlin Conservatory of Music, currently Herbert S. Autrey Professor of Violoncello and Coordinator of Chamber Music at the Shepherd School of Music at Rice University. Since 1985, he has taught at the Tanglewood Music Center (summer home of the Boston Symphony Orchestra) in Lenox, MA where he holds the position as Coordinator of Chamber Music.
- Volume VI: dedicated to Leopold Teraspulsky and Jacqueline Melnick, founders and directors of the Musicorda Chamber Music Institute and Festival in South Hadley, MA.
