= Register (Muhly) =

Organ concerto by Nico Muhly

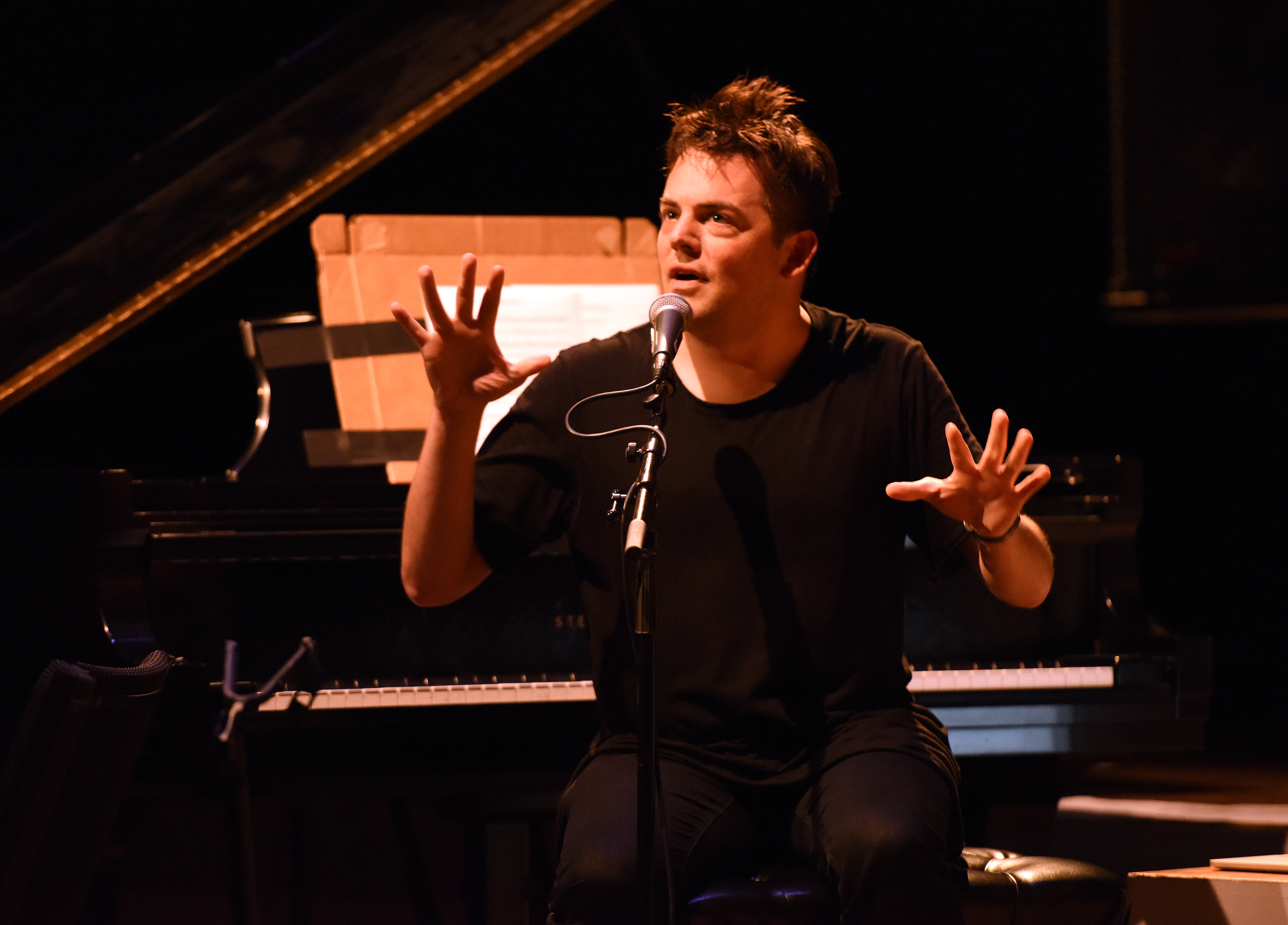
Nico Muhly in 2014

Register (Concerto for Organ and Orchestra) is an organ concerto written in 2017 by the American composer Nico Muhly. The work was written on a joint commission from the Los Angeles Philharmonic, the Philadelphia Orchestra, and the Southbank Centre. Its world premiere was given by the organist James McVinnie and the Los Angeles Philharmonic conducted by James Conlon at the Walt Disney Concert Hall, Los Angeles, on February 23, 2018.

== Composition ==
The concerto is cast in one continuous movement and lasts about 23 minutes in performance. Muhly wrote Register specifically in collaboration with James McVinnie, whom is a longtime friend of the composer. Regarding the composition of the concerto, Muhly wrote in the program note, "The piece is built around three distinct cycles of chords: one, large and ascending, with a sense of slight menace; the second, bright, descending, and brilliant; and the third, a sparkling perpetual-motion machine, in whose genetic past is a Pavane in G minor by Orlando Gibbons (1583–1625), a composer with whose music Jamie and I both enjoy a lifelong romance."

=== Instrumentation ===
The work is scored for solo pipe organ and a large orchestra consisting of a piccolo, two flutes (2nd doubling piccolo), two oboes, three clarinets (2nd doubling E♭ clarinet; 3rd doubling bass clarinet), two bassoons (2nd doubling contrabassoon), four horns, three trumpets, two trombones, bass trombone, tuba, timpani, four percussionists, harp, piano, and strings.

== Reception ==
Reviewing the world premiere, Mark Swed of the Los Angeles Times described Register as "frenetic, verging on claustrophobic" and "very New York urban" on the surface, adding, "Underneath, it gets more nuanced." He continued, "For most of the concerto's 20 minutes, Register, doesn't let you catch your breath. A sharp percussion attack sets the organ off in one manner; another attack and the orchestra suddenly changes direction. Different chord sequences go every which way. The effect is exhilarating, but the goal is something else, a quiet liberation with dulled strings and the organ mellowed. The concerto ends with what feels like the arrival in a sanctuary, where the real business is about to begin. Every New Yorker knows that miraculous momentary escape feels like." David Patrick Stearns of The Philadelphia Inquirer similarly described the piece as "exhilarating, initially disorienting, and slightly mad" at its East Coast premiere in Philadelphia, adding, "After his initial shock therapy, Muhly assumed a catch-me-if-you-can exuberance in a piece that, like his Mixed Messages written a few years ago for the Philadelphia Orchestra, is so stuffed with content that numerous hearings are necessary to take in all that the piece is made of."
