= Viola Concerto (Muhly) =

2014 Viola Concerto by Nico Muhly

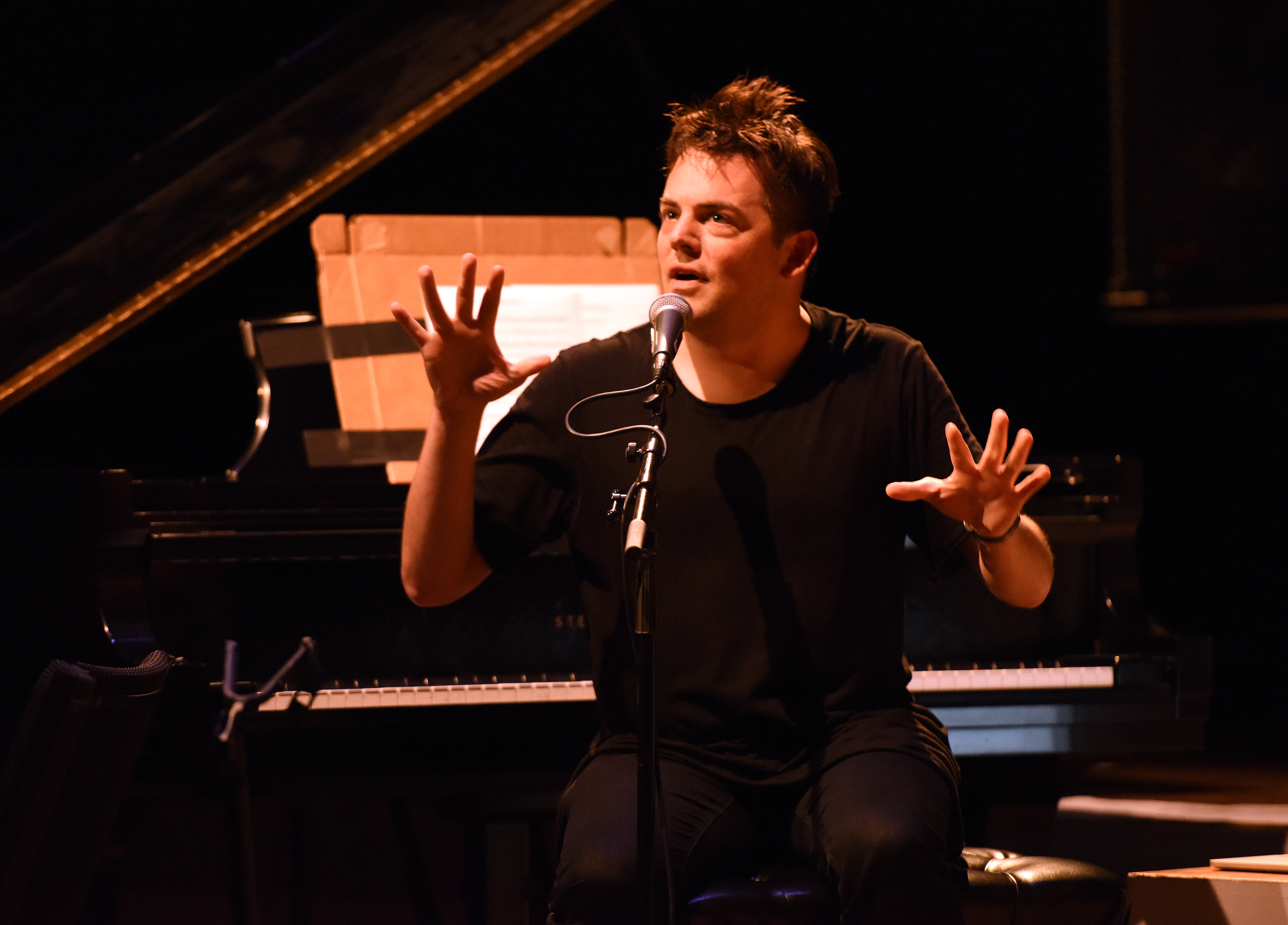
Nico Muhly in 2014

The Viola Concerto is a composition for solo viola and orchestra by the American composer Nico Muhly. Composed in 2014, the work was jointly commissioned by the Orquesta Nacionales de España, the Detroit Symphony Orchestra, Festival de Saint Denis, and the National Arts Centre Orchestra. It was first performed on February 6, 2015, by the violist Nadia Sirota and the Orquesta Nacionales de España under the conductor Nicholas Collon. The piece was later given its United States premiere on October 23, 2015, by Sirota and the Detroit Symphony Orchestra under Leonard Slatkin.

== Composition ==
The Viola Concerto has a duration of approximately 24 minutes and is composed in three connected sections. The piece was written specifically for the violist Nadia Sirota, with whom Muhly has held a lasting artistic relationship since they attended Juilliard School together.

=== Instrumentation ===
The work is scored for a solo viola and an orchestra comprising two flutes, piccolo, two oboes, cor anglais, two clarinets, bass clarinet, two bassoons, four horns, three trumpets, two trombones, bass trombone, tuba, three percussionists, piano (doubling celesta), and strings.

== Reception ==
Reviewing the United States premiere, Mark Stryker of the Detroit Free Press highly lauded the composition, writing:

There's a moment of magic in Nico Muhly's major new Viola Concerto near the end of the first section when the texture thins out enough that a lyrical solo melodic line from the soloist emerges from the fray and floats over a rhythmic murmur played by piccolo, flute and glockenspiel. The music is spare, tactile and a little spacey, and seems to briefly open a window on the infinite.

He continued:

Not everything in Muhly's concerto communicated with such clarity. But the piece — which was given its American premiere Friday morning by the soloist Nadia Sirota and the Detroit Symphony Orchestra led by music director Leonard Slatkin — came into greater and greater focus as it continued. By the end, you feel as if you've been on a journey, happy to have been along for the ride.
