= Saturn (Sufjan Stevens, Bryce Dessner, Nico Muhly and James McAlister song) =

Song performed by Sufjan Stevens

Single by Sufjan Stevens, Bryce Dessner, Nico Muhly and James McAlister

from the album Planetarium
- Released: March 27, 2017
- Length: 3:51
- Label: 4AD

"Saturn" is a 2017 single by Sufjan Stevens, Bryce Dessner, Nico Muhly, and James McAlister, featured on the collaborative album Planetarium. It was officially released on March 27, 2017, although it had previously been performed as early as 2012 as a part of the group's original Planetarium performances.

The song's release was accompanied by a lyric video. The lyrics of the song reference the ancient Greek god Cronus (Saturn in Roman mythology). According to Greek and Roman mythology, after Cronus overthrew his father, the god Uranus, it was prophesied that Cronus's own sons would overthrow him. To prevent this eventuality, he devoured his newborn children, the gods Demeter, Hestia, Hera, Hades, and Poseidon. Cronus was eventually overthrown and imprisoned by his youngest son, Zeus.
