= Robert Sirota =

American composer

- Born: Robert Sirota; October 13, 1949 (age 77)
- Origin: New York City, New York, United States
- Genre: classical rock
- Occupations: Composer, conductor
- Years active: 1971–present
- Website: www.robertsirota.com

Robert Sirota (born October 13, 1949) is an American composer based in New York City and Searsmont, Maine. Sirota has written solo instrumental, vocal, chamber, orchestral, operatic, and liturgical works. He is the father of American violists Nadia Sirota and Jonah Sirota, and husband to organist and Episcopal priest Victoria Sirota. Dating back to 1994, Robert Sirota's work can be found on nine studio albums recorded by an assortment of musicians including: Dinosaur Annex Ensemble, the Chiara String Quartet, and the American String Quartet. Most recently, Sirota's 2020 work for cello and piano, Family Portraits, was recorded by the Fischer Duo for their album 2020 Visions, released on Navona Records on August 26, 2022.

== Education and career ==
Born in New York, Sirota received his earliest compositional training at The Juilliard School. He earned his Bachelor of Music degree in piano and composition from Oberlin Conservatory, studying with Joseph Wood and Richard Hoffman. Sirota received a Thomas J. Watson Fellowship, which allowed him to study abroad in Paris, where his principal teacher was Nadia Boulanger. Sirota went on to study with Earl Kim and Leon Kirchner, earning his Ph.D. in composition from Harvard University.

During his career he has chaired the music department at New York University and served as Director of Boston University's School of Music. In 1995, he became Director of the Peabody Institute of Johns Hopkins University. In 2005 he became President of Manhattan School of Music, where he was also a composition professor. He served as president there until 2012.

Sirota has held residencies and seminars at institutions in the United States and abroad, including Carnegie Mellon University, the University of Cincinnati College-Conservatory of Music, the University of Missouri–Kansas City, the University of Nebraska–Lincoln, Samford University, Miami Dade College's New World School of the Arts, Peabody Institute, and the Yong Siew Toh Conservatory in Singapore. In New York City he developed the Bridging the Gap concert series at National Sawdust.

In 2019 and 2020 a series called Sirota @ 70 marked his 70th birthday with performances of Sirota's compositions. These included commissions for the event such as Job Fragments, written for baritone Thomas Pellaton; Dancing With the Angels which featured flutist Carol Wincenc; and Blackird Singing, which had its world premiere performance by flutist Linda Chesis at the Cooperstown Summer Music Festival. Some performances scheduled for this period were postponed because of the COVID-19 pandemic and rescheduled, such as the Telegraph Quartet's premiere of his new composition Contrapassos.

== Grants and publishing ==
Grants to Sirota have come from the Guggenheim Foundation, National Endowment for the Arts, United States Information Agency, Watson Foundation, American Music Center, and Meet The Composer. The publishers of his music have included Theodore Presser, Schott, Music Associates of New York, MorningStar, To the Fore, and Muzzy Ridge Music, the Sirotas' own publishing enterprise named for Muzzy Ridge in Searsmont, Maine, where Sirota spends part of the year.

== Muzzy Ridge Concert Series ==
Since 2021 Sirota has presented a performance series called Muzzy Ridge Concerts at a large studio space he added to his Searsmont home. The concerts have featured musicians including flutist Carol Wincenc and cellist Velléda Miragias of Duo Coquelicot, violinist Laurie Carney, pianist David Friend, pianist and composer Nico Muhly, and oboist Regina Brady, as well as Sirota's son, violist Jonah Sirota, his daughter, violist Nadia Sirota, and his wife, organist and pianist Victoria Sirota.

== Commissions ==
- Wave Upon Wave for the Naumburg Foundation (2017)
- Immigrant Songs for the Cathedral Church of St. John the Divine (2018)
- Luminous Bodies performed by Jeffrey Kahane and yMusic at the Sarasota Music Festival (2018)
- Hafez Songs for Palladium Musicum (2018)
- O Blessed Holy Trinity for choir and organ, for Trinity Episcopal Church, Indianapolis
- Cello Sonata No. 2 for Benjamin Larsen and Hyungjin Choi (2019)
- In the Fullness of Time, Mass for chorus, organ and percussion, Apparitions for organ and string quartet, for the American Guild of Organists (1999)
- American String Quartet
- Alarm Will Sound
- Paul Simon (arrangements for Simon and sextet yMusic)

== Compositions and projects ==
Sirota has composed over 100 works. The most significant include:

- 1988: The Clever Mistress – chamber opera in one act, libretto By Robert Sirota, based upon a story from the Decameron by Giovanni Boccaccio
- 1990: Mass
- 1999: In the Fullness of Time for organ and orchestra
- 2004: Triptych for string quartet
- 2007: 212: Symphony No. 1
- 2008: A Rush of Wings
- 2012: Pange Lingua Sonata for violin and piano
- 2013: Sonata No. 2: Farewell for violin and piano
- 2016: American Pilgrimage for string quartet
- 2017: Wave Upon Wave for string quartet
- 2018: Luminous Bodies for clarinet, flute, trumpet, violin, viola, cello, and piano
- 2019: Contrapassos for soprano and string quartet
- 2020: Family Portraits for cello and piano

His works have been performed by ensembles including Alarm Will Sound, Lincoln's Symphony, New Hampshire Symphony, New Haven Symphony, Seattle Symphony, Vermont Symphony, Virginia Symphony, the Saint Petersburg State Orchestra (Russia), the Royal Conservatory Orchestra (Toronto), and the Yong Siew Toh Conservatory Orchestra (Singapore), and at venues including the Aspen Music Festival, Caramoor, Death of Classical (Brooklyn), Bargemusic, the Metropolitan Museum of Art, Kaufman Music Center, National Sawdust, Carnegie Hall's Weill Recital Hall and Zankel Hall, and Tanglewood.

Conductors of his music have included JoAnn Falletta, Kenneth Kiesler, Gerard Schwarz, Alan Pierson, Bramwell Tovey, and Yan Pascal Tortelier.

Musicians who have performed his music include pianists Jeffrey Kahane, Vicky Chow, Ben Pasternack, David Friend, Soyeon Kate Lee, and Jeanne Kierman Fischer; flutists Carol Wincenc, Alex Sopp, and Linda Chesis; violinists Laurie Carney, Hyeyung Sol Yoon, Rebecca Fischer, and Nicholas Mann; violists Cynthia Phelps, Daniel Avshalomov, Jonah Sirota, and Nadia Sirota; cellists Norman Fischer, Gregory Beaver, and David Geber; and organists Hatsumi Miura, Victoria Sirota, and Heinrich Christensen.

== Discography ==
=== Studio recordings ===
212: Symphony No. 1	2026	Released: April 17, 2026; Label: Azica Records; Format: CD, Digital
2020 Visions	2022	Released: August 26, 2022; Label: Navona Records; Format: CD, Digital
New York Rising	2019	Released: August 20, 2019; Label: Classax Records; Format: CD, Digital
Elegy for a Lost World	2018	Released: June 22, 2018; Independent Release; Format: CD, Digital
Parting the Veil	2014	Released: December 1, 2014; Label: Albany Records; Format: CD, Digital
Celestial Wind: Organ Works of Robert Sirota	2014	Released: May 6, 2014; Label: Albany Records; Formal: CD, Digital
Triptych	2004	Released: 2004; Label: New Voice Singles; Format: CD, Digital
The Kay Africa Memorial Organ	2002	Released: 2002; Independent Release; Format: CD
Works for Cello	2001	Released: 2001; Label: Gasparo Records; Format: CD
New Sounds from the Village	1994	Released 1994; Capstone Records; Format: CD

=== Arrangements ===
Paul Simon: In the Blue Light	2018	Released September 7, 2018; Legacy Recordings; Format: CD, Digital
Paul Simon: Seven Psalms	2023	Released May 19, 2023; Owl Recordings; Format: CD, Digital
