= Valgeir Sigurðsson =

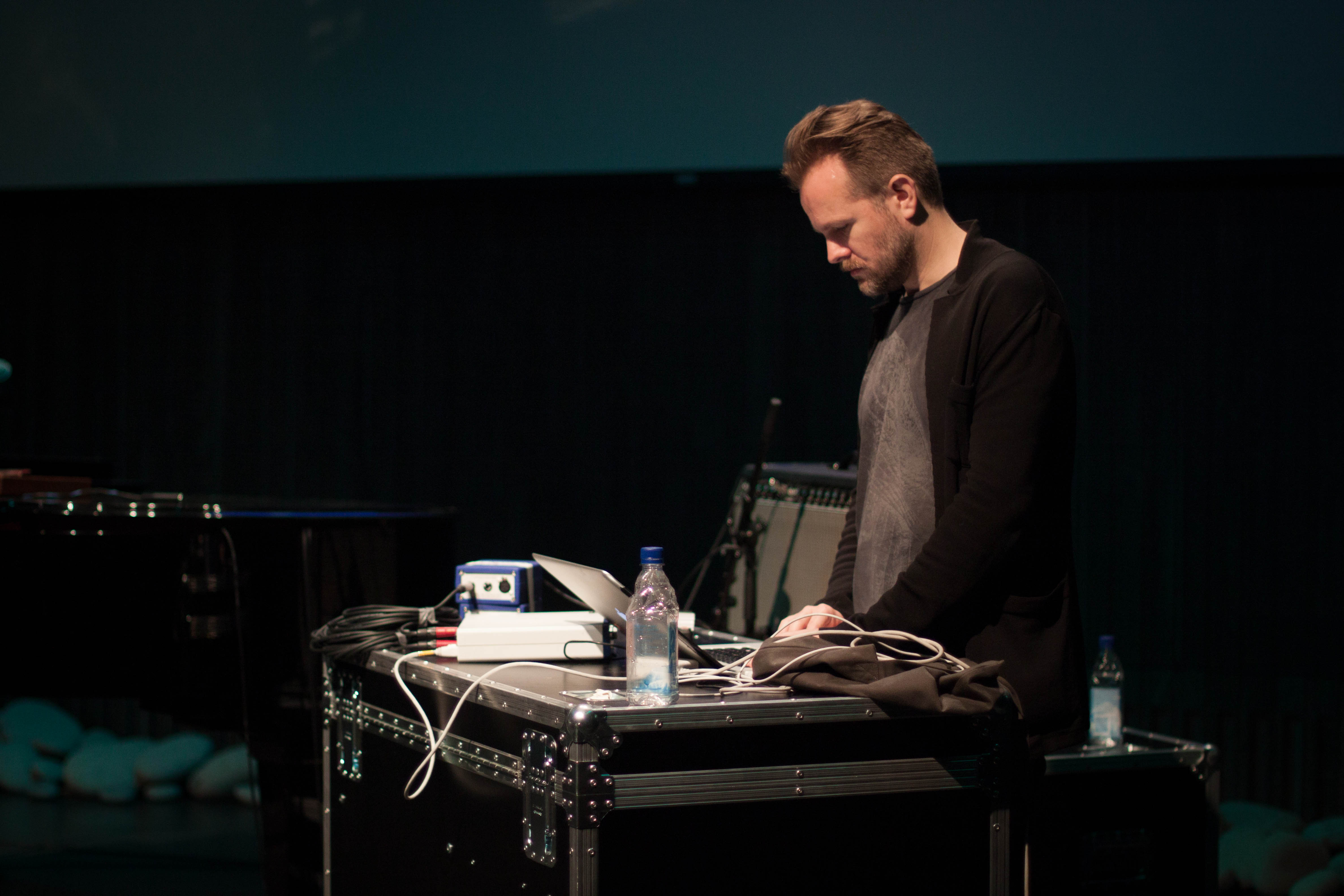
- Valgeir Sigurðsson performing at PopTech in Reykjavík, Iceland in 2012

Background information
- Born: 18 June 1971 (age 54)
- Origin: Iceland
- Genres: Electronic, experimental, alternative, soundtrack
- Occupations: Producer, composer, musician, audio engineer
- Labels: Bedroom Community
- Website: Official Website

Valgeir Sigurðsson (born 18 June 1971) is an Icelandic record producer, mixer, composer, audio engineer and musician.

== Biography ==
Coming from a musical background, Valgeir's fascination with recording technology led to a job in a small recording studio at the age of 16. He plays keyboards, bass, percussion, electronics/programming and studied classical guitar, graduating with a Tonmeister degree from London's SAE Institute. In 1998 Valgeir was hired by fellow countrywoman Björk as engineer and programmer on the soundtrack for Lars von Trier's Dancer in the Dark. A song from the film, I've Seen It All (a duet with Radiohead's Thom Yorke) was nominated for the Academy Award for Best Original Song but lost to Bob Dylan's Things Have Changed. Valgeir created the distinctive train-rhythm that runs through the song. His working relationship with Björk continued beyond the film project and was consistent from early 1998 until 2006, during which time Valgeir was one of her main studio collaborators.

Valgeir is the founder of Greenhouse Studios, Iceland's top recording facility established in 1997, where in addition to Björk, he has collaborated with artists such as Bonnie 'Prince' Billy, Feist, Damon Albarn, Camille, CocoRosie, Ben Frost, Sam Amidon, múm, Hilary Hahn & Hauschka, Brian Eno, Sigur Rós, Emel Mathlouthi, and many others. In 2005 he founded the Bedroom Community record label launching the recording career of Nico Muhly and producing and releasing albums by Ben Frost and Sam Amidon. He has composed music for TV, film and theatre and his debut solo album Ekvílibríum was released by Bedroom Community in 2007, followed by a release of his soundtrack for Dreamland (Draumalandið) in 2009. The score of Dreamland was performed live in 2011 by the Iceland Symphony Orchestra by the Winnipeg Symphony Orchestra in 2012, and the BBC Scottish Symphony Orchestra and Ilan Volkov, in 2013. His first conventional classical commission, Nebraska Quartet was premiered by the Chiara String Quartet at the Lincoln Center during NYC's Ecstatic Music Festival in 2011. Valgeir's third LP Architecture of Loss was released in September 2012 to critical acclaim. Ghosts, for chamber ensemble, was the result of a commission the Crash Ensemble, and launched in Dublin in November 2013. The Winnipeg Symphony Orchestra and Alexander Mickelthwate premiered Eighteen Hundred and Seventy-Five, for orchestra and electronics, as part of its annual New Music Festival in January 2014.

== Selected works ==
=== Stage works ===
- 2009 Green Aria, (co-composed with Nico Muhly), for chamber orchestra and electronics
- 2012 Architecture of Loss, ballet for chamber ensemble of 3 players and electronics
- 2014 Wide Slumber for lepidopterists, music-theatre piece for 3 singers, 4 musicians and electronics
- 2018 Woman Undone, music-theatre work for five singers/instrumentalists

=== Orchestral ===
- 2011 Dreamland, for large orchestra and electronics
- 2013 Dreamland, for chamber orchestra and optional electronics
- 2013 Eighteen Hundred and Seventy-Five, for orchestra and electronics
- 2014 No Nights Dark Enough, for chamber orchestra and electronics

=== Ensemble ===
- 2011 Past Tundra, for chamber ensemble of 9 players with electronics
- 2011 Nebraska, for string quartet
- 2012 Architecture of Loss, ballet for chamber ensemble of 3 players and electronics
- 2013 Ghosts, for chamber ensemble of 10 players with electronics
- 2014 The Crumbling (from Architecture of Loss), for chamber ensemble of 6 players
- 2014 Raindamage, for string trio and electronics
- 2014 Dissonance, for viola da gamba and electronics
- 2015 Veej, for chamber ensemble of 18 players
- 2015 For Love of Her (do but kill me), for voice, chamber ensemble of 10 players and electronics
- 2018 Remnant, for viola and electronics
- 2018 Dust, for violin and electronics

=== Electronics Only ===
- 2016 Antigravity, electronic track

== Discography ==
=== Solo ===
- 2007 Ekvílibríum
- 2010 Draumalandið
- 2012 Architecture of Loss
- 2017 Dissonance

=== Production ===
| Year | Artist | Album | Credits |
|---|---|---|---|
| 1988 | Unun | Ótta | Producer, Engineer, Keyboards, Programmer |
| 1988 | Magga Stína | An Album | Producer, Engineer, Programmer |
| 2000 | Björk | Selmasongs | Engineer, Programmer |
| 2001 | Megas | Far… Þinn Veg | Producer, Engineer, Mixing, Programmer |
| 2001 | Quarashi | Kristnihald undir Jökli | Engineer, Mixing |
| 2001 | Egill S | Tonk Of The Lawn | Producer, Engineer, Mixing |
| 2001 | Múm | Finally We Are No One | Producer, Engineer, Mixing |
| 2001 | Björk | Vespertine | Engineer, Programmer |
| 2002 | Slowblow | Nói Albínói, Original Soundtrack | Engineer, Mixing |
| 2002 | Björk | Family Tree | Engineer, Mixing |
| 2002 | Howie B and Húbert Nói | Music for Astronauts and Cosmonauts | Engineer |
| 2003 | Machine Translations | Love On The Vine | Composer, Producer, Engineer, Mixing |
| 2003 | Björk | Live Box | Engineer, Mixing |
| 2004 | Björk | Medúlla | Engineer, Programmer |
| 2005 | Björk | Drawing Restraint 9 | Co-Producer, Engineer, Programming, Keyboards |
| 2006 | Reykjavík! | Glacial Landscapes, Religion, Oppression and Alcohol... | Producer, Engineer, Mixing, Mastering |
| 2006 | Kate Havnevik | Melankton | Composer, Co-Producer, Engineer, Mixing |
| 2006 | Nico Muhly | Speaks Volumes | Producer, Engineer, Mixing, Programming, Mastering |
| 2006 | Bonnie 'Prince' Billy | The Letting Go | Producer, Engineer, Mixing, Mastering |
| 2007 | Njúton | Roto con moto | Producer, Engineer, Mixing, Mastering |
| 2007 | Hildur Ingveldardóttir Guðnadóttir | Lost In Hildurness | Mixing |
| 2007 | Stars Like Fleas | The Ken Burns Effect | Mastering Engineer |
| 2007 | Sprengjuhöllin | Tímarnir okkar | Producer, Engineer, Mixing, Mastering |
| 2007 | Kate Nash | Caroline's A Victim | Producer, Engineer, Mixing |
| 2007 | Ben Frost | Theory Of Machines | Engineer, Mixing, Mastering |
| 2007 | Maps | We Can Create | Producer, Engineer, Programming |
| 2007 | CocoRosie | The Adventures of Ghosthorse and Stillborn | Producer, Engineer, Mixing, Programming |
| 2008 | Oren Lavie | The Chronicles of Narnia: Prince Caspian (soundtrack) | Producer, Engineer, Mixing, |
| 2008 | Sprengjuhöllin | Bestu kveðjur | Producer, Engineer, Mixing, Mastering |
| 2008 | Motion Boys | Hang On | Producer, Engineer, Mixing, Mastering |
| 2008 | Helgi Hrafn Jónsson | For The Rest Of My Childhood | Engineer, Mixing |
| 2008 | Call me Kat | I'm In A Polariod, Where Are You? | Mixing, Mastering |
| 2008 | Ane Brun | Changing of the Seasons | Producer, Engineer, Mixing |
| 2008 | Camille | Music Hole | Engineer, Mixing |
| 2008 | Sam Amidon | All Is Well | Producer, Engineer, Mixing, Programming, Bass Guitar, Percussion, Mastering |
| 2008 | Nico Muhly | Mothertongue | Producer, Engineer, Mixing, Programming, Bass Guitar, Mastering |
| 2009 | Dan Michaelson & The Coastgrds | Saltwater | Producer |
| 2009 | Hildur Ingveldardóttir Guðnadóttir | Without Sinking | Mixing |
| 2009 | Aaron Thomas | Made of Wood | Producer, Engineer, Mixing, Percussion |
| 2009 | Ben Frost | By The Throat | Producer, Mastering, Guitar |
| 2010 | Mr Fogg | Moving Parts | Producer, Mixing |
| 2010 | Daníel Bjarnason | Processions | Producer, Engineer, Mixing, Mastering, Programming |
| 2010 | Sam Amidon | I See The Sign | Producer, Engineer, Mixing, Mastering, Bass, Percussion |
| 2010 | Wildbirds & Peacedrums | Iris | Mixing |
| 2010 | Wildbirds & Peacedrums | Retina | Mixing |
| 2010 | Moddi | Floriography | Producer |
| 2010 | The Magic Numbers | The Runaway | Producer, Programming |
| 2011 | Erica Mou | È | Producer |
| 2011 | Feist | Metals | Co-Producer, Additional Horn Arrangements |
| 2011 | Puzzle Muteson | En Garde | Producer, Mixing, Mastering, Electronics, Percussion |
| 2011 | Kronos Quartet / Kimmo Pohjonen / Samuli Kosminen | Uniko | Producer, Engineer, Mixing |
| 2011 | Ben Frost & Daníel Bjarnason | SÓLARIS | Producer, Engineer, Mixing |
| 2012 | yMusic | Beautiful Mechanical | Mastering |
| 2012 | Eighth Blackbird | Lonely Motel: Music from Slide | Mastering |
| 2012 | Alarm Will Sound | Canzonas Americanas | Mastering |
| 2012 | Mr Fogg | Eleven | Producer, Engineer, Mixing |
| 2012 | Paul Corley | Disquiet | Mixing, Mastering |
| 2012 | Nico Muhly | Drones | Producer, Mixing, Mastering |
| 2012 | Hilary Hahn & Hauschka | Silfra | Producer, Engineer, Mixing |
| 2012 | Sigur Rós | Valtari | Engineer |
| 2012 | Damon Albarn | Dr Dee | Mixing |
| 2013 | James McVinnie | Cycles | Producer, Mixing, Mastering |
| 2013 | Nadia Sirota | Baroque | Producer, Mixing, Mastering, Programming, Synthesizer |
| 2013 | Ben Frost / Valgeir Sigurðsson / Nico Muhly / Sam Amidon | Everything Everywhere All The Time / Whale Watching Tour | Producer, Mixing, Mastering |
| 2013 | Michael Wookey | Submarine Dreams | Mastering |
| 2013 | CocoRosie | Tales of a GrassWidow | Producer, Engineer, Beat Programming |
| 2013 | Daníel Bjarnason | Over Light Earth | Producer, Mixing, Mastering, Electronics |
| 2013 | Sigur Rós | Kveikur | Engineer |
| 2013 | Tim Hecker | Virgins | Mixing, Keyboards |
| 2014 | Rhob Cunningham | The Window and Day | Producer, Mixing, Roland SH101, Percussion, Wurlitzer |
| 2014 | Sam Amidon | Lily-O | Producer |
| 2015 | GABI | Sympathy | Mastering |
| 2017 | Emel Mathlouthi | Ensen | Producer |

=== Film and TV ===
| Year | Tile | Director | Credits |
|---|---|---|---|
| 2000 | Being John Malkovich | Spike Jonze | Co-Producer, Engineer, Programming |
| 2001 | Dramarama (Villiljós) | Dagur Kári Pétursson, Ragnar Bragason, Inga Lísa Middleton, | Composer, Producer, Engineer, Mixing, Programming, Various Instruments |
| 2005 | Drawing Restraint 9 | Matthew Barney | Composer, Co-Producer, Engineer, Programming, Keyboards |
| 2008 | Mannaveiðar | Björn B Björnsson | Composer, Producer, Engineer, Mixing, Programming, Keyboards |
| 2009 | Dreamland (Draumalandið) | Þorfinnur Guðnason, Andri Snær Magnason | Composer, Producer, Engineer, Mixing, Programming, Keyboards, Percussion |

=== Other ===
- 2009 Green Aria, composed by Valgeir Sigurðsson and Nico Muhly for Scent Opera, Guggenheim Museum, NYC
