= Mixed Messages =

Mixed Messages may refer to:

- Messages from one source that convey apparently contradictory information
- Mixed Messages (Muhly), a 2015 orchestral composition by Nico Muhly
- "Mixed Messages" (song), by Tom Cardy, 2021
- Mixed Messages (video game), by Vicarious Visions, 2009
- "Mixed Messages", a song by Big K.R.I.T. from the 2017 album 4eva Is a Mighty Long Time
- "Mixed Messages", a song by Cliff Eidelman from the 2009 soundtrack He's Just Not That Into You: Original Motion Picture Score
