= Ekvílibríum =

Studio album by Valgeir Sigurðsson
- Released: 2007
- Length: 49:17
- Label: Bedroom Community
- Producer: Valgeir Sigurðsson

Ekvílibríum is an album by Valgeir Sigurðsson, released in 2007. Notable appearances on the album include Bonnie 'Prince' Billy and Dawn McCarthy, who contribute vocals, along with Nico Muhly, who appears in half of the tracks playing different keyboard instruments. Drummer Samuli Kosminen from fellow Icelandic band múm also makes a guest appearance.

Professional ratings
Review scores
Source	Rating
Allmusic	4/5 stars

== Track listing ==
1. "A Symmetry" - 4:41
2. "Evolution of Waters" - 4:39
3. "Focal Point" - 6:09
4. "Baby Architect" - 4:51
5. "After Four" - 3:39
6. "Winter Sleep" - 4:49
7. "Equilibrium Is Restored" - 8:24
8. "Before Nine" - 1:42
9. "Kin" - 5:09
10. "Lungs, For Merrilee" - 5:10

== Personnel ==
- Una Sveinbjarnadóttir - violin
- Jónína Auður Hilmarsdóttir - viola
- Hrafnkell Orri Egilsson - cello
- Bonnie 'Prince' Billy/Will Oldham - vocals and writing on tracks 2 and 9
- Dawn McCarthy - vocals and writing on track 6
- Nico Muhly - piano and celesta on tracks 2, 3, 5, 6, 8 and 9
- Samuli Kosminen - drums on tracks 1, 2, 5 and 10
- Hildur Ingveldardóttir Guðnadóttir - cello on tracks 8 and 9
- Ólöf Arnalds - backing vocals on track 2
