= Mr Fogg =

- Born: Phil Barry
- Origin: Reading, Berkshire, England
- Genre: Electropop
- Years active: 2005–present
- Labels: Kicking Ink Recordings, Kompakt, Worst Case Scenario, Little League, Spinout, Kimi Records, This Time Records
- Website: Official website

Mr Fogg is an English electronic musician from Reading, Berkshire, England. He is the grandson of an opera singer and the great-grandson of two 19th-century music hall performers.

== Origin of name ==
Mr Fogg derives his name from Phileas Fogg, the main fictional character in the 1872 Jules Verne novel, Around the World in Eighty Days. In an interview with BBC Radio 1's Annie Nightingale, he stated that the name arose as, 'Phileas sounds somewhat like Phil', his own Christian name.

== Early singles ==
Mr Fogg's first solo material appeared at the end of 2005, and was followed by a national tour and the self-released debut single, "Giving In" which gained BBC Radio 1, BBC 6Music and XFM airplay.

After winning the 2006 BBC Radio Berkshire demo search contest, Mr Fogg won the opportunity to open the Carling Stage at the Reading and Leeds Festivals over the August 2006 festival weekend, playing with a five-piece live band.

Towards the end of 2006, Mr Fogg released "Seciov" on Worst Case Scenario Records, receiving substantial airplay on BBC Radio 1, BBC Radio 2, BBC 6Music, XFM, MTV2 and QTV, including records of the week from Marsha Shandur on XFM and Tom Robinson on 6 Music. As well as a tour, live appearances included "Mr Fogg's Latin Lesson" on the Annie Nightingale's BBC Radio 1 show and a live session for Janice Long on BBC Radio 2 - including an interview and live versions of "Stung", "Moving Pictures" and "Seciov".

In August 2007, Mr Fogg's third release "Stung" was released and again picked up support from various radio stations.

Later in the year, a remix 12 inch single of "Seciov" was released, with mixes by Vandal, Loulou Players and Si McEvoy. The Vandal mix picked up airplay worldwide, including stations in Russia, the United States, Australia and the Netherlands.

== Moving Parts ==
In an interview with the BBC in 2007, Mr Fogg said that he had so far written over 40 songs for his debut album. In subsequent interviews he revealed that the album was recorded in Iceland in 2009 with Valgeir Sigurðsson and that Moving Parts, would be released in April 2010.

The first single, "Keep Your Teeth Sharp", was released in February 2010 and launched at Mr Fogg's pop-up shop in Soho in December 2009. The "Keep Your Teeth Sharp" EP also included "Whispers" and "Keep Your Distance", with a remix of the title track by the Icelandic composer Ólafur Arnalds.

The "Moving Parts" single was remixed by Jakwob, Karoshi, Rennie Pilgrem and Pelops, and the video was filmed in Los Angeles, with film director, Tony Kaye. Another single, "Stung", was released on 23 August 2010.

== Eleven ==
In early 2012, Mr Fogg announced the release of his second album "Eleven" with a free download of the song "Stay Out Of The Sun". This was followed by the single A Little Letting Go in May, and the album release in June.

The album release was accompanied by a European tour of Germany, Belgium, Italy, Denmark, Netherlands, Poland and the UK.

== Youth ==
Mr Fogg released his third album Youth in 2015, in which he reflected on the sudden death of his father three years earlier. A departure from the electronic sounds of his previous releases, the album was based on a soundscape of intimate acoustic sounds such as string quartet, church organ and harp. To promote the release, Fogg performed a five-day run at Brighton Fringe Festival, being nominated for best music show.

== In Paradise ==
Recorded at home during the pandemic lockdown, his first album in seven years was released in March 2022.

== Speech in Colour ==
Mr Fogg released his fifth album Speech in Colour in November 2025, performing live for the first time in several years during 2026, including a fourth appearance at Truck Festival.

== Remixes and productions ==
As well as his own music, Mr Fogg has produced and remixed songs by several other artists, including The Twang, The Good Natured, The Race, midimidis, Ruby Frost and Heart Kill Giant. In March 2010, his remix of "Hollywood" by Marina and The Diamonds was played by Rob Da Bank on BBC Radio 1.

Artists to remix Mr Fogg's music include Olafur Arnalds, Mica Levi, John Digweed, Howie B, Rennie Pilgrem, Bondax and Maribou State.

== Discography ==
=== Singles and EPs ===
- Giving In EP (Own Label) - 2006
- "Seciov" (Worst Case Scenario) - 2006
- "Stung" (Little League) - 2007
- "Seciov The Remixes" (Spinout) - 2007
- Keep Your Teeth Sharp EP (Kicking Ink) - 2009
- "Moving Parts" (Kicking Ink) - 2010
- "Stung" (Kicking Ink Recordings) - 2010
- "Answerphone" (Kicking Ink Recordings) - 2011
- "Stay Of The Sun" (Kicking Ink / Kompakt) - 2012
- "A Little Letting Go" (Kicking Ink / Kompakt) - 2012
- "Time To Ascend" (Kicking Ink / Kompakt) - 2015
- "No House For These Thoughts" (Kicking Ink / Kompakt) - 2015
- "Youth" (Kicking Ink / Kompakt) - 2015
- "In Paradise" (Kicking Ink) - 2020
- "We Don't Crawl Out Of The Swamp (Unless We Get What We Want" (Kicking Ink) - 2020
- "Living Underwater" (Kicking Ink) - 2022
- "Some Things Matter" (Kicking Ink) - 2025
- "Close to the Surface" (Kicking Ink) - 2025
- "Do Your Worst" (Kicking Ink) - 2026

=== Albums ===
- Moving Parts (Kicking Ink) - 2010
- Eleven (Kicking Ink / Kompakt) - 2012
- Youth (Kicking Ink / Kompakt) - 2015
- In Paradise (Kicking Ink) - 2022
- Speech in Colour (Kicking Ink) - 2025
