= Sentences (Muhly) =

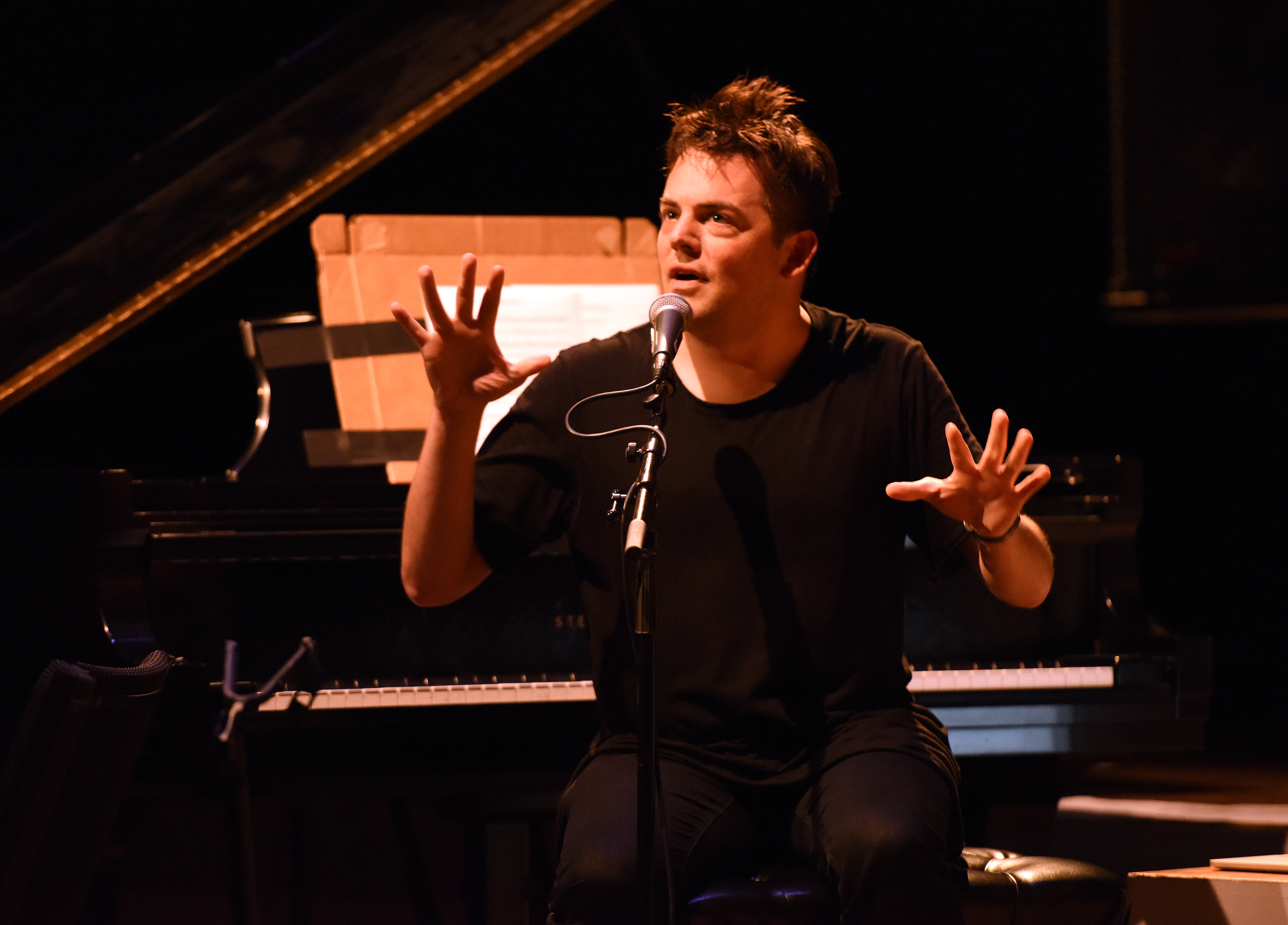
Nico Muhly in 2014

Sentences is an oratorio for countertenor and orchestra based on the life and work of the logician Alan Turing. It was written by the American composer Nico Muhly with a libretto by Adam Gopnik. The work was commissioned by the Britten Sinfonia and was first performed on June 6, 2015, by the countertenor Iestyn Davies and the Britten Sinfonia under Muhly.

== Composition ==
Sentences has a duration of roughly 30 minutes and is composed in six parts with a coda. Muhly described the inspiration for the piece in the score program notes, writing:

Sentences is a thirty-minute meditation, in collaboration with Adam Gopnik, on several episodes drawn from the life and work of Alan Turing. Turing lived, in a sense, many different lives, but at the heart of his work was, I think, a very musical set of anxieties. Even the idea of code-breaking is inherently musical; the French for score-reading is déchiffrage: deciphering. His wartime work on the Enigma code translated, later in life, to a more nuanced relationship to code in the form of a primitive but emotionally (and philosophically) complicated artificial intelligence. The piece uses a single voice not to speak necessarily as Turing, but as a guide through these various episodes.

He added:

I've always felt that the question of sentient computers is wildly emotional: we anthropomorphise the Mars Rover, imagining its solitude on that dusty planet. Any act of communication in which the second person is unseen can be a one-way conversation. An email, sent, can never be returned — did it arrive or did it not? —, or a text message can be delivered but never read. The thrill of a fast response is immediately tempered with the harsh but empty rudeness of an out-of-office reply. Anybody who has made a condolence phone call only to hear the voice of the deceased on the outgoing answering machine message knows the complexities of what could be a simple binary communication.

=== Instrumentation ===
The work is scored for a solo countertenor and an orchestra comprising flute, oboe, clarinet, bassoon, trombone, bass trombone, percussion, celesta, and strings.

== Reception ==
Reviewing the world premiere, Tim Ashley of The Guardian lauded, "'No one wants a gay martyr oratorio,' Muhly has said. Indeed, the tone is alternately celebratory and sorrowful. His post-minimalist, asymmetric rhythms suggest the excitement of intellectual discovery. A quiet elegy for Morcom forms the work's touching kernel." Hannah Nepil of the Financial Times similarly wrote:

...Adam Gopnik's libretto frequently reads like a philosophical riddle, while the score relies heavily on clever number games. Drawing on minimalist influences, Muhly thrills in multi-layered rhythmic patterns. But far from being emotionally arid, the piece is poetic, at times exquisite, revealing a glimpse of Muhly at his best. He gives us shimmering strings, tinkling glockenspiel, and an assortment of unearthly harmonies. And although there is much prettiness for prettiness's sake, some sections are genuinely poignant, particularly those dealing with the death of Turing's first love, Christopher Morcom. In this elegant performance from countertenor Iestyn Davies and the Britten Sinfonia under Muhly himself, no detail was either overcooked or overlooked.
