= Bright Mass with Canons =

Bright Mass with Canons is a mass for choir and organ by the American composer Nico Muhly. It was written for the choir of Saint Thomas Church Fifth Avenue and its then music director and organist John Scott. The piece was premiered in New York City in February 2005 by the Choir of Men & Boys of Saint Thomas Church.

== Composition ==
Bright Mass with Canons has a duration of roughly 13 minutes and is scored for organ and SSAATTBB chorus. Muhly described his prolific use of canons—from which the piece is titled—in the score program notes, writing:

There are canons "imitative repetitions" in almost every bar of the Mass. In the Kyrie and Gloria, canons reference the imitative writing of early English composers Byrd and Weelkes, whereas the canonic writing in the Sanctus and the Agnus Dei is more abstract and spatial. The most intense use comes towards the beginning the Sanctus, in which each singer repeats a given figure in his own time, creating a flurry of sound to fill the space in St. Thomas's sanctuary.

=== Structure ===
The piece is composed in four movements:

1. Kyrie
2. Gloria
3. Sanctus & Benedictus
4. Agnus Dei

=== Chamber Version ===
American composer Buck McDaniel arranged a chamber version of the work for the Boston University Tanglewood Institute Festival Chorus scored for chorus, two pianos and percussion. This arrangement premiered in 2014 conducted by Ann Jones.

== Reception ==
Since its premiere, Bright Mass with Canons has received modest praise from music critics. Allan Kozinn of The New York Times opined, "Driven, joyful motifs, couched in a harmonic language that oscillates between light dissonance and a firmly traditional, Renaissance-like openness, propel the Kyrie, parts of the Gloria and the Sanctus. Those same musical moves take a more introspective, purely devotional turn in the Agnus Dei." Mark Swed of the Los Angeles Times called the piece "interesting" and said it "has the quality of a Steve Reich mix of old English choral music — clever, bright, show-offy."

Ivan Moody of Gramophone was slightly more critical of the piece, writing:

No one could accuse Nico Muhly of a lack of exuberance. As he freely acknowledges in his notes, his time as a chorister influenced him profoundly, and he is happy to absorb and reprocess bits of the sound world of Tudor music and Howells within his own vocabulary, characteristic of which is a saturatedly rich harmonic writing and, frequently, minimalist figuration. So the almost tinselly quality of Bright Mass with Canons comes as no surprise, though I am not quite sure that it is the sum of its parts.
