= It Remains to Be Seen =

It Remains to Be Seen is a single-movement composition for orchestra by the American composer Nico Muhly. The work was commissioned by the Boston University Tanglewood Institute for their 40th Anniversary Gala Concert. It was premiered in July 2006 by the BUTI orchestra under the conductor James Gaffigan.

== Composition ==
It Remains to Be Seen has a duration of roughly 11 minutes and is composed in a single movement. Muhly described the inspiration for the piece in the score program notes, writing:

The piece begins with a chord identical to the one at the end of Stravinsky's Firebird suite and proceeds into a series of charged nocturnal episodes. I wanted to treat the feeling of having just heard music, and being expected to make one's own – referencing the experience of leaving a BSO concert at the shed, walking back to BUTI on a curvy back road, arguing about music in pairs and threes, and at the sign of bright headlights from behind, reorganizing in single file as a car filled with happy concert-goers speeds by. The piece is a nine-minute navigation of an excited, occasionally illuminated, dark road filled with arguing, cars, fragments of remembered music, and a constant, propulsive pulse.

=== Instrumentation ===
The work is scored for an orchestra comprising piccolo, three flutes, two oboes, English horn, two clarinets, bass clarinet, two bassoons, contrabassoon, four horns, four trumpets, two trombones, bass trombone, tuba, timpani, four percussionists (glockenspiel, two octaves of crotales, marimba, vibraphone, sandpaper blocks, bass drum, crash cymbals, tambourine, large tam-tam, tenor drum, triangle, wood block), two harps, piano, strings.

== Reception ==
Will Robin of NewMusicBox called the piece "a lovely, loving orchestral work that pays tribute to his wistful nighttime walk from the Tanglewood main grounds back to West Campus following a concert."
