= In Certain Circles (concerto) =

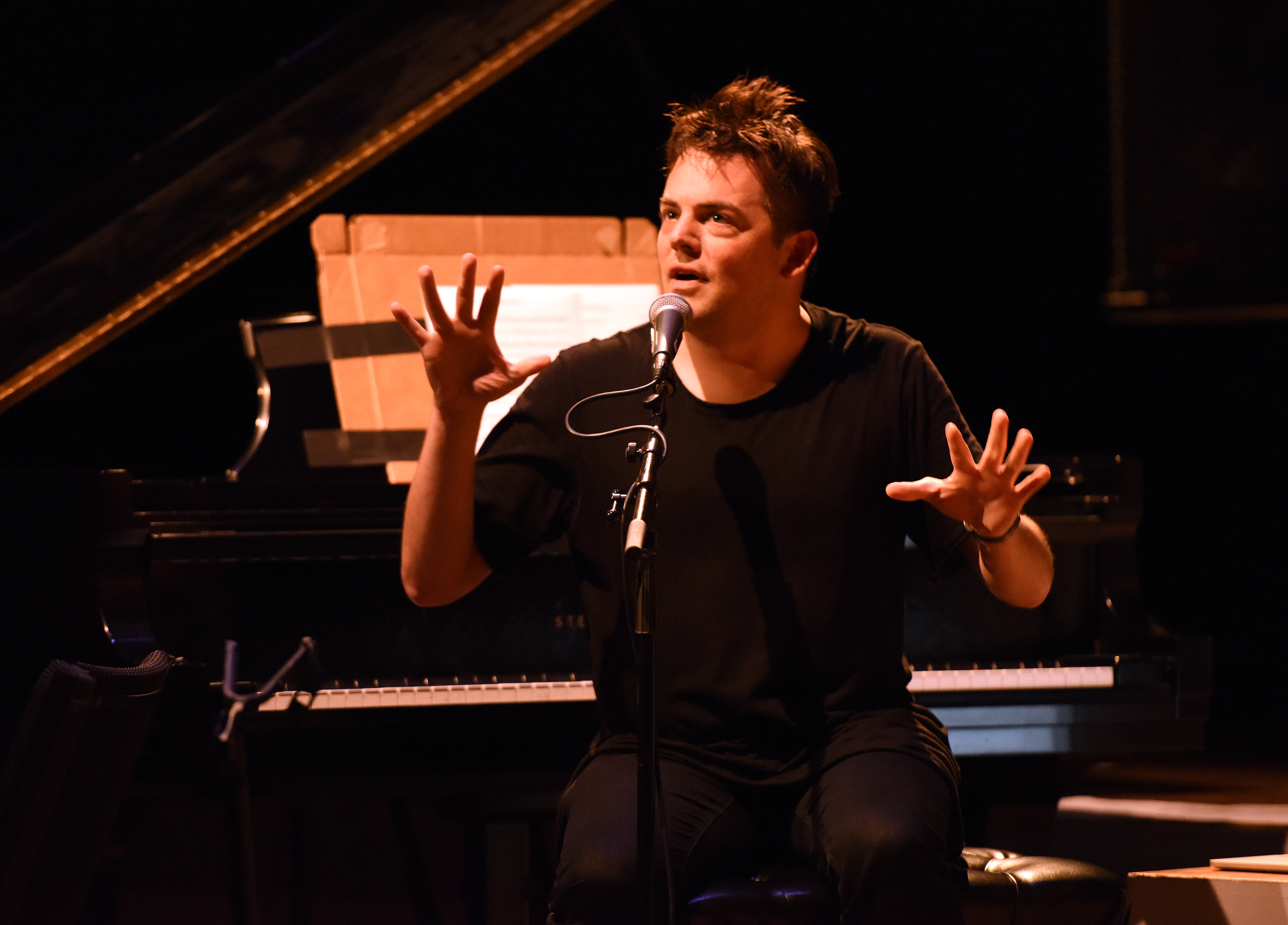
Nico Muhly in 2014

In Certain Circles is a concerto for two pianos and orchestra written in 2020 by the American composer Nico Muhly. The work was commissioned for the pianists Katia and Marielle Labèque by the New York Philharmonic, the Tonhalle Düsseldorf-Düsseldorfer Symphoniker, the Orchestre de Paris-Philharmonie de Paris, and the Royal Liverpool Philharmonic. Its world premiere was given by the Labèque sisters and the Orchestre de Paris conducted by Maxim Emelyanychev at the Philharmonie in Paris on July 6, 2021.

== Composition ==
=== Structure ===
In Certain Circles has a duration of roughly 21 minutes and is composed in three movements:

1. L'Enharmonique
2. Sarabande & Gigue
3. Details Emerge

The first movement "L'Enharmonique" was inspired by the eponymous piano composition by the French Baroque composer Jean-Philippe Rameau, which is occasionally quoted throughout the movement and once more in the final movement. The second movement "Sarabande & Gigue" features the two Baroque dance forms for which it is named. In the score program note, Muhly described the third movement "Details Emerge" thus, "'Disconnection' is the guiding musical principle here; the music shifts quickly from very dark to very bright, from jagged rhythms to simple ones, and from delicate to quite violent."

=== Instrumentation ===
The work is scored for two pianos and a large orchestra comprising two flutes (2nd doubling piccolo), piccolo, two oboes (2nd doubling Cor anglais), two clarinets (2nd doubling bass clarinet), bassoon, contrabassoon, four horns, three trumpets, two trombones, bass trombone, tuba, timpani, three percussionists, harp, and strings.

== Reception ==
In Certain Circles has been generally praised by music critics. Oussama Zahr of The New York Times described it as "an exciting new piece—focused, phantomlike, unafraid of sentiment." Jay Nordlinger of The New Criterion wrote, "If the concerto isn't French, it is Frenchish. It has colors and mystery. It has 'lull' and 'wash.' I believe it is meant to be spell-casting, and maybe the spell was cast, for some audience members. The piece is no doubt intelligent, and it would be interesting to look closely under the hood, understanding the composer's logic."
