= Puzzle Muteson =

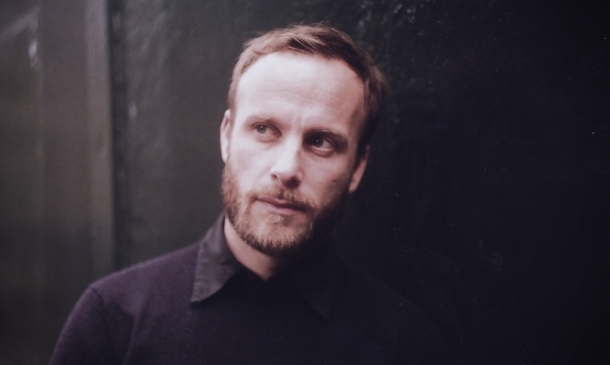

Background information
- Occupation: Songwriter
- Label: Bedroom Community

Puzzle Muteson is a project of singer/songwriter Terry Magson, from the Isle of Wight. Born in London, he attended music college for a short period but decided to continue his musical explorations on his own, developing his songwriting and voice, whilst teaching himself guitar.

== Career ==
His debut album, En Garde, on which he worked with Valgeir Sigurdsson and Nico Muhly, was released in 2011 through Bedroom Community records; based in Reykjavík, Iceland.

=== Tours ===
He has toured the UK and Ireland, supporting, amongst others: The Fruit Bats, Death Vessel and Sub Pop.

== Discography ==
- 2011: En Garde (Bedroom Community)
- 2014: Theatrics (Bedroom Community)
- 2018: Swum (Bedroom Community)
