= Nadia Sirota =

American viola player

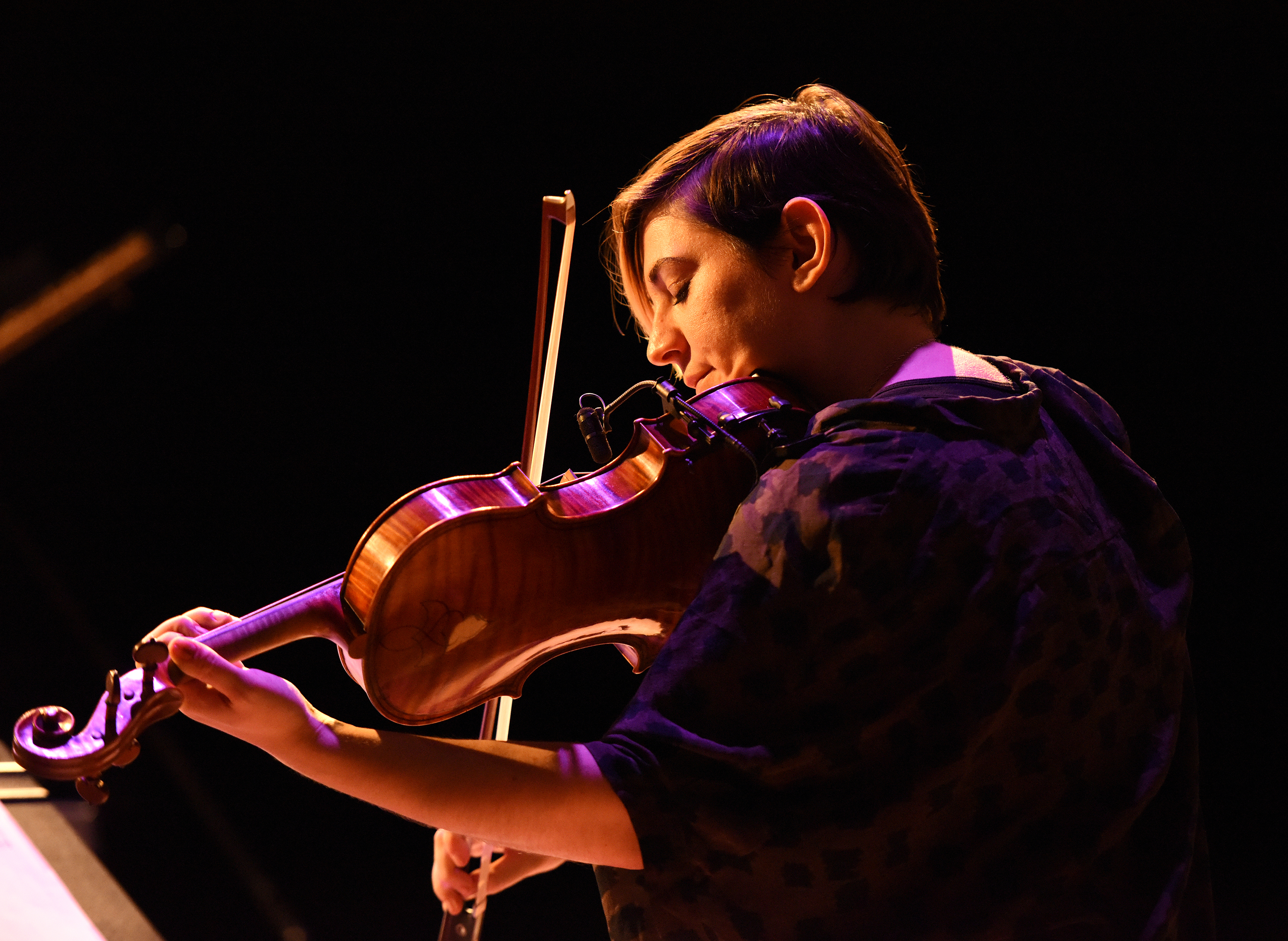
Nadia Sirota performing in 2014

Nadia Sirota (born in New York) is an American viola player. (Note: "The viola is one of those soulful, lost-in-the- middle instalments that occasionally erupt into the foreground – when Nadia Sirota is handling one, for example.") Her father is Robert Sirota, a composer and conductor.

== Life and career ==
Sirota is best known for her singular sound and expressive execution, coaxing solo works from the likes of Nico Muhly, Daníel Bjarnason, Judd Greenstein, Marcos Balter and Missy Mazzoli. (Note: "Muhly formed alliances with a number of musicians who have become regular collaborators, including Nadia Sirota, a violist. Sirota says of Muhly, "He is different from a lot of composers his age in that he prefers a kind of old-school way.") Her debut album First Things First was released in 2009 on New Amsterdam Records and cited as a record of the year by The New York Times, and her second album, Baroque, was released in March 2013. In 2012, she recorded Nico Muhly's "Drones & Piano" with pianist Bruce Brubaker; it appears on the Bedroom Community recording Drones.

In addition to her work as a soloist, Sirota is a member of yMusic, ACME (the American Contemporary Music Ensemble) and Alarm Will Sound, and has lent her sound to recording and concert projects by such artists and songwriters as Grizzly Bear, Dirty Projectors, Jónsi and Arcade Fire. Sirota also hosted a radio show on WQXR's New Music radio stream, Q2Music, for which she was awarded the 2010 ASCAP Deems Taylor Award in Radio and Internet Broadcasting. Sirota is the recipient of Southern Methodist University's 2013 Meadows Prize, awarded to pioneering artists and scholars with an emerging international profile. In 2015, Sirota won a Peabody Award for her work on WQXR's Q2 Music podcast, Meet the Composer, which she co-created and hosted. She received her undergraduate and master's degrees from the Juilliard School, and since 2007 has been on faculty at the Manhattan School of Music in their Contemporary Performance Program.

Since 2018, Sirota has served as the New York Philharmonic’s Creative Partner.

== Discography ==
=== As leader ===
Year	Album	Notes
2017	Tessellatum	a Bedroom Community release
2013	Baroque	a Bedroom Community release
2009	First Things First	with Judd Greenstein and Clarice Jensen

=== As sideman ===
Year	Album	Artists
2018	Never Let Me Down 2018	David Bowie
2018	Brighter Wounds	Son Lux
2017	Planetarium	Sufjan Stevens, Bryce Dessner, Nico Muhly & James McAlister
2017	Thanks for Listening	Chris Thile
2015	So There	Ben Folds and yMusic
2015	Divers	Joanna Newsom
2014	In the Hollows	Dead Heart Bloom
2013	Secrets of Antikythera	Andrew McPherson
2013	Trouble Will Find Me	The National
2013	Lanterns	Son Lux
2013	Traveling Alone	Tift Merritt
2012	Swing Lo Magellan	Dirty Projectors
2012	My Antagonist	Jónsi
2012	Drones	Nico Muhly
2012	Sugaring Season	Beth Orton
2012	Gossamer	Passion Pit
2012	Architecture of Loss	Valgeir Sigurðsson
2011	Lar Fleur de L'Aube	Arcade Fire
2011	Songs of Ascension	Meredith Monk
2011	Puzzle Muteson	En Garde
2011	Lumiere	Dustin O'Halloran
2011	All Things Will Unwind	My Brightest Diamond
2010	The Suburbs	Arcade Fire
2010	Strange Waves	Dirty Projectors
2010	Go	Andrew McPherson
2010	I Drink the Air Before Me	Nico Muhly
2010	High Violet	The National
2010	LP4	Ratatat
2010	Strange Weather, Isn't It?	!!!
2009	The Conformist	Faux Fix
2008	A Thousand Shark's Teeth	My Brightest Diamond
2006	Speaks Volumes	Nico Muhly
