= Michael Wookey =

- Born: March 23, 1983 (age 43)
- Origin: Southampton, England
- Occupations: Musician, composer
- Label: We Are Unique Records
- Website: michaelwookey.com

Michael Wookey (March 23, 1983) is an English singer-songwriter and composer, born in Southampton and based in Paris.

== Career ==
Wookey self-released his first album, Dreams of You, in 2003. His fourth album, Submarine Dreams, was released in 2013 by We Are Unique Records. The album was mastered by Valgeir Sigurðsson at Greenhouse Studios in Iceland, with original album artwork by Gabríela Friðriksdóttir. The disc was recorded in Cantal, France with four members of Angil and the Hiddentracks, with whom Wookey toured.

Wookey is known for using toy instruments in his music, and in 2013 he arranged a 10-person toy orchestra to play his compositions at Paris's Théâtre du Châtelet; a second performance followed in 2014. He collaborated with Margaret Leng Tan and wrote a concerto for her named "Coney Island Sous l'Eau." The U.S. premiere of Wookey's concerto was in 2013 at the Washington Square Music Festival in New York City, with The New York Times calling it "the most rewarding of the pieces for toys on the program."

Wookey also composed the music for the film Brochet comme le poisson, directed by Anne Brochet and broadcast by Arte TV in 2013 and multiple documentaries since.

Michael Wookey is also member of Contrebrassens, a French band that makes covers of the French singer, Georges Brassens.

== Discography ==
Year	Album
2003	Dreams Of You
2007	You Shield Me From Darkness
2010	Gun Gala
2013	Submarine Dreams
2016	Wild and Weary
2018	Hollywood Hex
2022	Truelove $ Day
2026	Leaving The Table
