= Angela and Jennifer Chun =

Korean-American violinists

Angela and Jennifer Chun are Korean-American violinists and collaborative artists.

== Biography ==
Angela and Jennifer Chun are Korean-American violinists and collaborative artists. They attended Juilliard School and have studied under Dorothy DeLay, Felix Galimir, and Nathan Milstein. They live and work in New York and London. As a duo, they first came on the music scene performing with the National Symphony Orchestra at the Kennedy center in Washington, D.C. Their SamSung Classics and Harmonia mundi recordings include music by Shostakovich, Bartok, Isang Yun. Their 2016 recording of Philip Glass and Nico Muhly ranked in the top 10 on Billboard and ITunes charts. Their recordings include music by Shostakovich, Bartók, Philip Glass, Nico Muhly, and Isang Yun. Angela Chun plays a Domenico Montagnana violin from 1734. Jennifer Chun's violin was built by Nicolo Amati in 1662 and is called the "Goding". The sisters often perform as a violin duo. In 2016 and 2021, they performed the United Nations opening day concert at the UN Assembly Hall in New York. It was live-streamed to 193 United Nations member countries. In 2009, Grawemeyer Award composer George Tsontakis wrote a two-violin concerto “Unforgettable” commissioned by George Soros for Jennifer and Angela Chun. It was world premiered at the Aspen music festival’s 60th anniversary season. In 2018, the Chuns co-founded a multi genre production company. Together with architect Charles Renfro and choreographer Jonah Bokaer, they collaborate in music, visual arts, and movement.

== Discography ==
- Fantasy, 2008
- Bartók, 2010
- Philip Glass: In the Summer House, Mad Rush and Nico Muhly: Four Studies, Honest Music, 2016
- UN opening day Concert
