= Cello Concerto (Muhly) =

Concerto for cello and orchestra by Nico Muhly

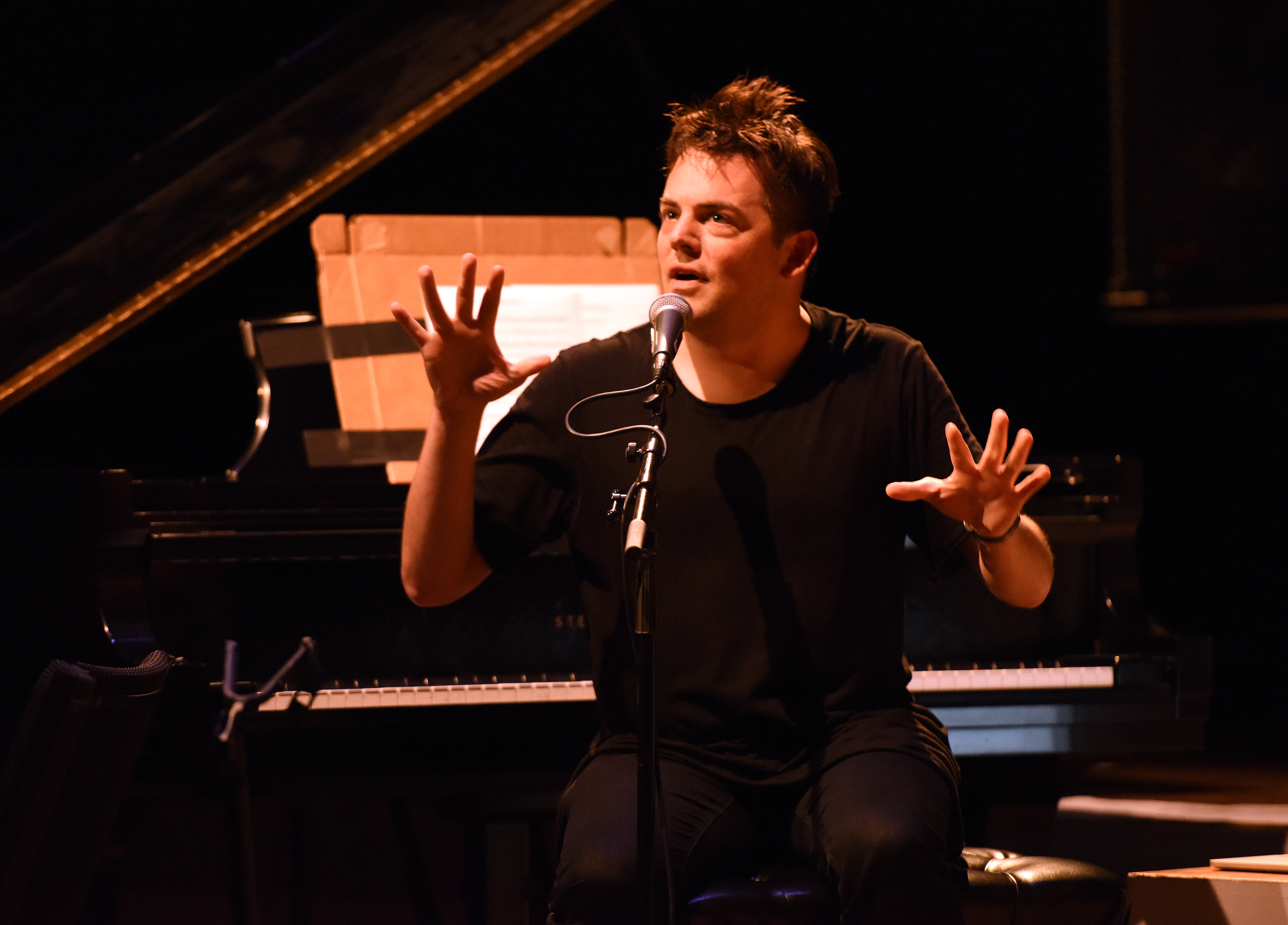
Nico Muhly in 2014

The Cello Concerto is a concerto for solo cello and orchestra by the American composer Nico Muhly. The work was commissioned by the Barbican Centre for the Britten Sinfonia and cellist Oliver Coates, to whom Muhly dedicated the piece. It was first performed on March 16, 2012 at the Barbican Centre by Coates and the Britten Sinfonia under conductor André de Ridder.

== Composition ==
The Cello Concerto has a duration of roughly 18 minutes and is composed in three numbered movements. The first movement quotes the texture from the opening bar of composer Henri Dutilleux's 1965 orchestral piece Métaboles.

=== Instrumentation ===
The work is scored for a solo cello and small orchestra comprising flute, oboe, clarinet, bassoon, horn, trumpet, trombone, bass trombone, one percussionist, piano (doubling celesta), harp, and strings.

== Reception ==
Reviewing the world premiere, Ivan Hewett of The Daily Telegraph praised the Cello Concerto as "instinctively 'musical' in its sharply heard orchestral palette, and its way of energising string cantilenas with off-beat Stravinskian accents." Hewett nevertheless added, "the promising opening soon lost its way, and attempts to restore direction through sudden harmonic shifts couldn't dispel a debilitating sense of drift."

Later reviews of the concerto have been more favorable, however. Reviewing the premiere recording of the piece by the cellist Zuill Bailey and the Indianapolis Symphony Orchestra under conductor Jun Märkl, Joshua Kosman of the San Francisco Chronicle called the piece a "lush, invigorating score" and described is as "suffused with a luxuriant beauty that is unafraid — for better or worse — of teetering into sentimentality". Ivan March of Gramophone similarly lauded the composition as an "original and inspired work". Helen Wallace of the BBC Music Magazine said it "presents a smorgasbord of slick ideas, enticingly presented, occasionally lacking in substance."

Russell Platt of The New Yorker wrote:

Part of what makes a great classical composition unique is its ability to inhabit a vivid present, while touching upon what’s happened before and hinting at what’s to come. And Muhly’s concerto does that wonderfully, providing a constant flow of plangent lyricism that nods to, but doesn’t slavishly imitate, the music of Dutilleux, Adams, Glass, and Britten (with little hat tips to Ravel and Michael Torke).

Platt added, "I respect Muhly's industry in all its forms, but the Cello Concerto is the type of Muhly piece that I will most look forward to."
