= Planetarium (album) =

Studio album by Sufjan Stevens, Bryce Dessner, Nico Muhly and James McAlister
- Released: June 9, 2017
- Recorded: May–August 2013
- Length: 75:59
- Label: 4AD

Sufjan Stevens chronology
| Carrie & Lowell Live (2017) | Planetarium (2017) | The Greatest Gift (2017) |

Singles from Planetarium
- 1. "Saturn" Released: March 26, 2017

Planetarium is a collaborative album featuring Bryce Dessner of the indie rock band The National, drummer James McAlister, contemporary classical music composer and arranger Nico Muhly, and singer-songwriter Sufjan Stevens. The album was released by 4AD on June 9, 2017. The group announced the recording on March 26, sharing the album's track listing along with the song "Saturn".

== Composition ==
The album consists of songs inspired by the Solar System. There are songs for the system's planets—Mercury, Venus, Earth, Mars, Jupiter, Saturn, Uranus, and Neptune—as well as the dwarf planet, Pluto. There are also songs inspired by black holes, Halley's Comet, the Kuiper belt, the Moon, and the Sun.

== Critical reception ==
Professional ratings
Aggregate scores
| Source | Rating |
|---|---|
| AnyDecentMusic? | 7.1/10 |
| Metacritic | 72/100 |
Review scores
| Source | Rating |
| AllMusic | 3/5 stars |
| The A.V. Club | C+ |
| The Guardian | 4/5 stars |
| The Independent | 4/5 stars |
| Mojo | 3/5 stars |
| The Observer | 4/5 stars |
| Pitchfork | 6.0/10 |
| Q | 3/5 stars |
| The Times | 4/5 stars |
| Uncut | 8/10 |

Planetarium received generally positive reviews from critics. At Metacritic, which assigns a normalized rating out of 100 to reviews from mainstream publications, the album received an average score of 72 based on 21 reviews, indicating "generally favorable reviews". The Guardian critic Kate Hutchinson dubbed Planetarium an "immersive, celestial space opera" and advised that it would be "best enjoyed loud, certainly in a live setting". Kitty Empire of The Observer wrote that the album, with its "grandeur and... considerable digital mayhem", recalled the electronics of Stevens' 2010 album The Age of Adz. Joseph Mathieu of Exclaim! praised the album's musical diversity and remarked that it "does the solar system justice with almost every conceivable sound". In his review for Uncut, Jason Anderson found that Planetarium successfully synthesizes Dessner and Muhly’s "classical ventures" with Stevens' "adventurous pop songcraft", noting the latter's ability to tackle "a variety of subjects, perspectives and treatments without losing his focus". Consequence of Sound's Kayleigh Hughes was most impressed by the "deeply personal, grounded stories" found in Stevens' lyrics.

Thea Ballard of Pitchfork was more reserved in her praise, describing Planetarium as "sonically luxurious to the point of sometimes sounding bloated (as such big-ticket pop-classical commissions are wont to be)." In his review for The A.V. Club, Josh Modell found that the album lacked focus: "It generally just plays like a wash of ideas without much of a through-line, despite its galaxy-driven conceit."

== Track listing ==
All tracks are written by Bryce Dessner, James McAlister, Nico Muhly, and Sufjan Stevens.

| No. | Title | Length |
|---|---|---|
| 1. | "Neptune" | 3:04 |
| 2. | "Jupiter" | 7:10 |
| 3. | "Halley's Comet" | 0:30 |
| 4. | "Venus" | 4:42 |
| 5. | "Uranus" | 6:51 |
| 6. | "Mars" | 7:08 |
| 7. | "Black Energy" | 5:25 |
| 8. | "Sun" | 3:59 |
| 9. | "Tides" | 0:58 |
| 10. | "Moon" | 3:42 |
| 11. | "Pluto" | 4:23 |
| 12. | "Kuiper Belt" | 2:04 |
| 13. | "Black Hole" | 0:33 |
| 14. | "Saturn" | 3:51 |
| 15. | "In the Beginning" | 1:17 |
| 16. | "Earth" | 15:10 |
| 17. | "Mercury" | 5:12 |
| Total length: | | 75:59 |

== Personnel ==
- Bryce Dessner – guitar, composition, engineering
- James McAlister – drums, percussion, synthesizer, organ, composition, mixing, engineering
- Nico Muhly – arrangement, composition, bass, celeste, organ, piano
- Sufjan Stevens – lead vocals, bagpipes, keyboards, mellotron, piano, programming, Prophet synthesizer, composition, engineering, mixing

== Charts ==
Chart performance for Planetarium
| Chart (2017) | Peak position |
|---|---|
| Belgian Albums (Ultratop Flanders) | 89 |
| Belgian Albums (Ultratop Wallonia) | 117 |
| Dutch Albums (Album Top 100) | 77 |
| French Albums (SNEP) | 148 |
| German Albums (Offizielle Top 100) | 82 |
| New Zealand Heatseekers Albums (RMNZ) | 5 |
| Portuguese Albums (AFP) | 36 |
| Scottish Albums (OCC) | 55 |
| Swiss Albums (Schweizer Hitparade) | 60 |
| UK Albums (OCC) | 92 |
| US Billboard 200 | 104 |
| US Top Alternative Albums (Billboard) | 12 |
| US Independent Albums (Billboard) | 5 |
| US Top Rock Albums (Billboard) | 20 |

== See also ==
- Comets in fiction
