= Håkan Rosengren =

Swedish clarinet virtuoso

Håkan Rosengren is a Swedish clarinet virtuoso, active in the United States and Europe.

== Colleagues ==
He has worked with:

- Esa-Pekka Salonen
- Neeme Järvi
- Christopher Hogwood
- Osmo Vänskä
- Jorma Panula
- Pascal Verrot
- Jan Krenz
- Matthias Aeschbacher
- Okko Kamu
- Keith Clark
- Sakari Oramo
- Leif Segerstam

in performances with the:

- Helsinki Philharmonic
- Swedish Radio Symphony
- Royal Stockholm Philharmonic
- Odense Symphony
- Helsingborg Symphony
- Royal Swedish Chamber
- Norrköping Symphony
- Southern Jutland Symphony
- Jönköping Symphony
- Umeå Sinfonietta
- Malmö Symphony Orchestras

== Discography ==
- Nielsen:Clarinet Concerto/Flute Concerto (Sony) 1993
- Bernhard Henrik Crusell: Works for Clarinet (Musica Sveciae) 1993
- Festival (Stereophile) 1995
- Schönberg/Martinu/Messiaen (Caprice) 1996
- Mendelssohn Concert Pieces, Brahms Sonata in E flat and Crusell Duet no. 1, 2 and 3 for two clarinets (Nytorp Musik) 1997
- Grand Duo: Selections of German Music for Clarinet and Piano (Nytorp Musik) 1999
- Olivier Messiaen: Quatuor pour la Fin du Temps (CD Accord) 2001
- Bernhard Henrik Crusell: Concerto in B flat Major/Quartets op. 2 and op. 4 (Caprice) 2002
- Saint Saens Sonata, Debussy Premiere rhapsody, Francaix Tema con variazioni, Messager Solo de Concours and other French music (SMS Classical) 2006
- Brahms, Mozart: Quintets for Clarinet and Strings (SMS Classical) 2006
- Brahms: Sonatas Op. 120; Rhapsodies Op. 79 (Round Top Records) 2006
- Carl Maria von Weber: Concertos for clarinet and orchestra (SMS Classical) 2008
- Frank Ticheli: Concerto for clarinet and wind band (SMS Classical) 2011

== Concerto solo performances ==
Rosengren’s concerto solo performances in Europe have taken him to the:

- Lausanne Chamber Orchestra
- Lithuanian National Symphony
- Prague Philharmonic
- Lisbon Metropolitan Orchestra
- Porto Chamber Orchestra
- Amadeus Chamber Orchestra
- Slovakia Radio Symphony
- Aukso Chamber Orchestra
- Poznan Philharmonic
- Polish Chamber Philharmonic

Elsewhere he has appeared with the:

- Los Angeles Mozart Orchestra
- Minas Gerais Symphony (Brazil)
- Savannah Symphony
- Akron Symphony
- Asheville Symphony
- Texas Festival Orchestra
- Midland-Odessa Symphony
- New West Symphony
- Israeli Chamber Orchestra
