= Chiara String Quartet =

Former string quartet from Lincoln, Nebraska

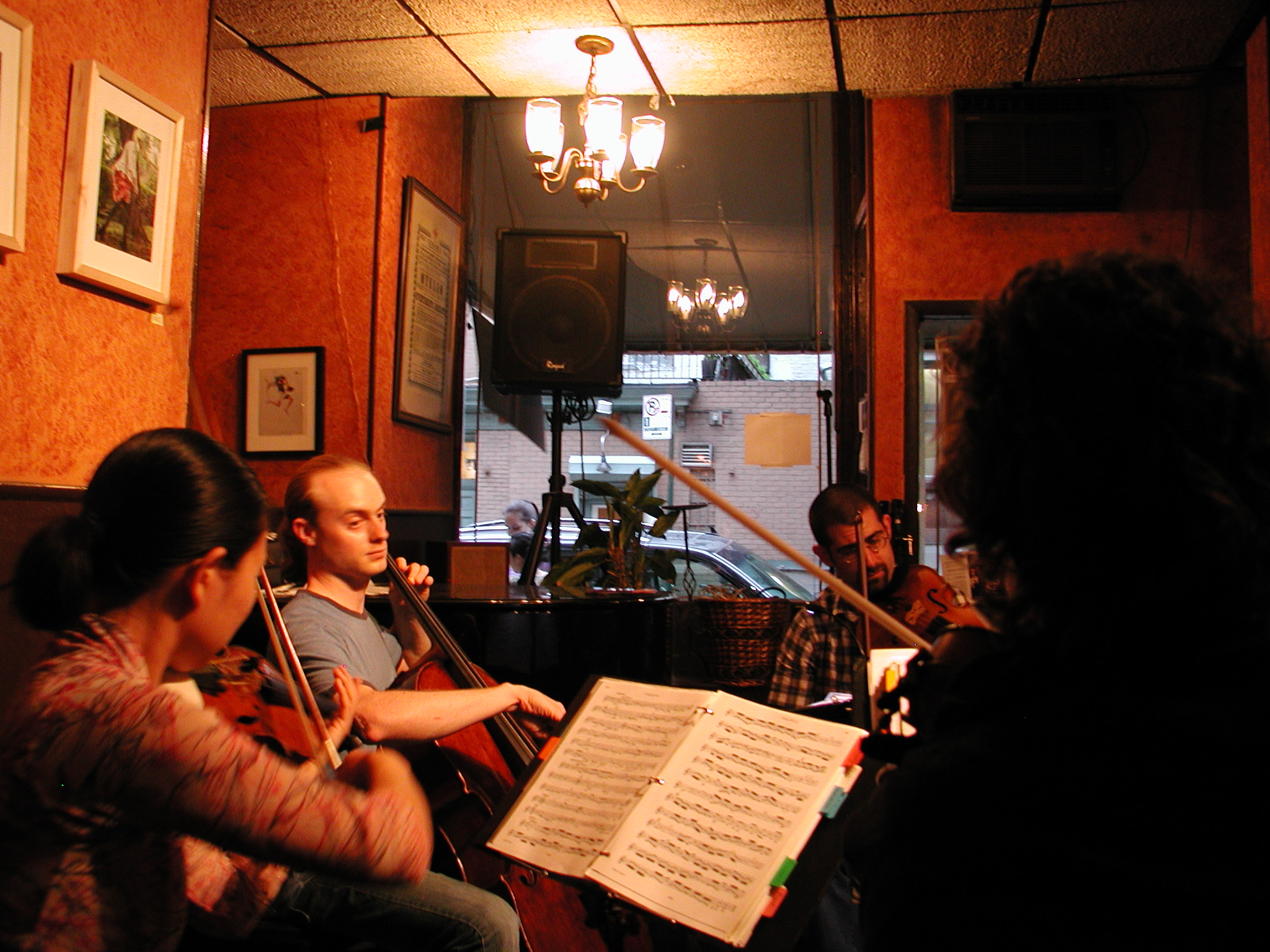
The Chiara Quartet performs at New York's Caffe Vivaldi, June 28, 2007

The Chiara String Quartet was an internationally performing professional string quartet based in Lincoln, Nebraska. The Group was the Quartet-in-residence at the School of Music in the University of Nebraska-Lincoln and the Blodgett Artists-in-Residence at Harvard University. The group was also in residence as faculty at the Greenwood Music Camp, a summer program for advanced high school musicians. The group's members were Rebecca Fischer and Hyeyung Julie Yoon, violins; Jonah Sirota, viola; and Gregory Beaver, cello.

In addition to traditional concertizing, in December 2006 the group began performing in bars and other unusual performance venues for a classical string quartet under the tagline "Chamber music in any chamber". This brought them into bars such as The Brick in Kansas City, Missouri, the Rose in Brooklyn (New York Times review), Avogadro's Number in Fort Collins, Colorado, and Avantgarden in Houston, TX.

On August 29, 2017, the members of the Chiara String Quartet announced that the 2017–2018 season would be their last, in order for them to focus on solo performance and teaching.

== Competitions and awards ==
The quartet's professional career started in 2000 with a Chamber Music America Rural Residency grant, placing the group in Grand Forks, North Dakota, where they lived until 2002. The group won the Senior String Gold Medal in the 2002 Fischoff National Chamber Music Competition, and was a winner of the 2002 Astral Artistic Services National Auditions, and was selected as the Lisa Arnholdt graduate string quartet at the Juilliard School from 2003-2005. The quartet also won third prize in the 2005 Premio Paolo Borciani.

In addition to the CMA Rural residency grant that began their career, the group was the recipient of a Commissioning grant and 3 Residency partnership grants from Chamber Music America, and a Meet the Composer grant.

The Chiara Quartet's recording of the Brahms and Mozart Clarinet Quintets was a Hot Pick of October 2006 for NET Radio. The Chiara Quartet's performance at Meany Hall in December 2007 was selected as one of the highlights of the year by Seattle Post-Intelligencer's R.M. Campbell.

== Commissions ==
From its beginning as a professional ensemble, the Chiara Quartet actively commissioned new works for string quartet. Composer Jefferson Friedman wrote his 2nd quartet for the group in 1999, when they were still students, and his 3rd quartet for them in 2005. Gabriela Lena Frank composed her Leyendas, an Andean Walkabout for String Quartet for the group in 2001 and her Ghosts in the Dream Machine piano quintet for the Chiara Quartet plus pianists Simone Dinnerstein in 2005. Robert Sirota wrote his Triptych, a commemoration of the victims of 9/11, for the quartet in 2002.

Other commissions include new quartets from Gabriela Lena Frank, Nico Muhly, Daniel Ott, and Huang Ruo for their 2010–2011 10th anniversary season as a part of their Club Premieres project.

== Discography ==
The Chiara Quartet released two shorter-length albums through their self-produced New Voice Singles series and one album of clarinet quintets with clarinetist Håkan Rosengren on the SMS Classical label. SMS Classical also contracted the quartet to record the complete Brahms string quartets plus the G Major viola quintet with violist Roger Tapping.

Release date	Album	Label
2004	Triptych: Robert Sirota	Chiara New Voice Singles
2006	Leyendas: An Andean Walkabout	Chiara New Voice Singles
2006	Quintets for Clarinets and Strings	SMS Classical
2014	Brahms by Heart	Azika Records
2016	Bartok by Heart	Azika Records

== Education Work ==
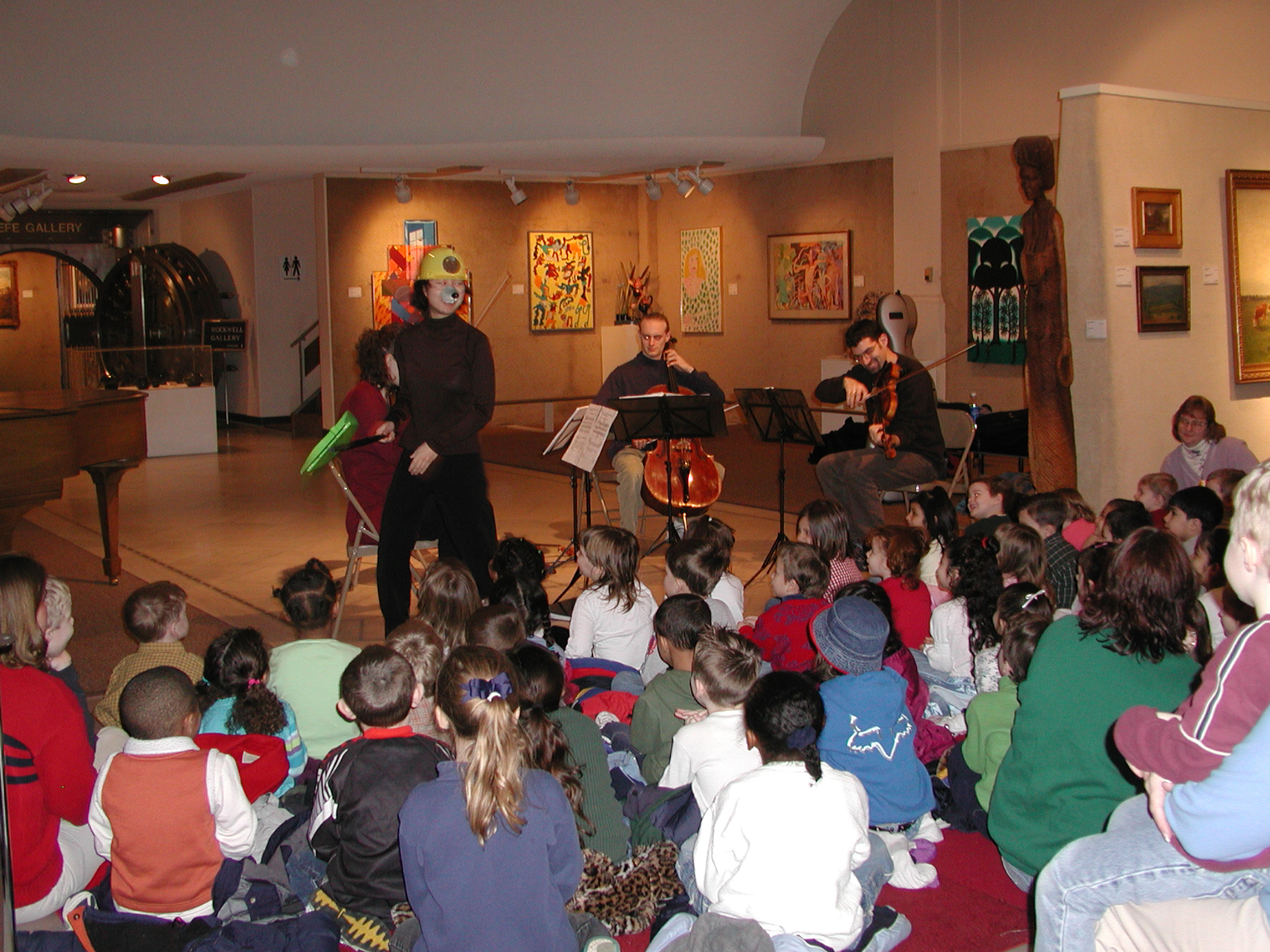
Chiara String Quartet performing Mole Music for young children in South Bend, IN

The Chiara Quartet developed extensive educational programs, including a musical version of David McPhail's Mole Music as well as several programs developed in concert with Young Audiences of New York between 2002 and 2004. The group worked with Eric Booth extensively and is mentioned in his book, The Music Teaching Artist's Bible: Becoming a Virtuoso Educator (Oxford University Press, 2009). While on the roster of Astral Artistic Services, the quartet undertook a large-scale multi-visit residency at the Rhoads School sponsored by a Chamber Music America Residency Partnership grant.
