= Borromeo String Quartet =

American string quartet in residence at the New England Conservatory

The Borromeo String Quartet is an American string quartet, in residence at the New England Conservatory since 1992. They have performed throughout North and South America, Europe, and Asia, at numerous festivals and in many distinguished chamber music series. They are named after the Borromean Islands.

The ensemble was formed in 1989 by violinists Nicholas Kitchen and Ruggero Allifranchini, violist EnSik Choi, and cellist Yeesun Kim, who were then all young musicians at the Curtis Institute of Music. Kitchen and Kim are husband and wife. Violist Hsin-Yun Huang joined the ensemble in 1994 after Choi left to pursue other opportunities. Allifranchini and Huang left the ensemble in 2000 to be replaced, respectively, by William Fedkenheuer and Mai Motobuchi. In 2006, Fedkenheuer left to pursue other opportunities (is now a member of the Miró Quartet) and was replaced by violinist Kristopher Tong. In 2022, Mai Motobuchi was replaced by Melissa Reardon.

The quartet's recent disk, As It Was, Is, And Will Be (2011), on the GM/Living Archive label features the music of Béla Bartók, Mohammed Fairouz and Gunther Schuller.

The quartet was a prize-winner at the 1990 International String Quartet Competition in Evian, France. In 1991, their winning of the Young Concert Artists International Auditions also earned them concert appearances at the Kennedy Center and the 92nd Street Y. In September 1998 the Quartet was named recipient of Chamber Music America's prestigious Cleveland Quartet Award. Richard Dyer of The Boston Globe wrote that the Borromeo Quartet "combines every 20th-century virtuoso ensemble virtue with an old-world sense of color, character, and style". In 1999 the Quartet was made the ensemble in residence for the National Public Radio program Performance Today.
