= Bedroom Community =

Icelandic and American music collective

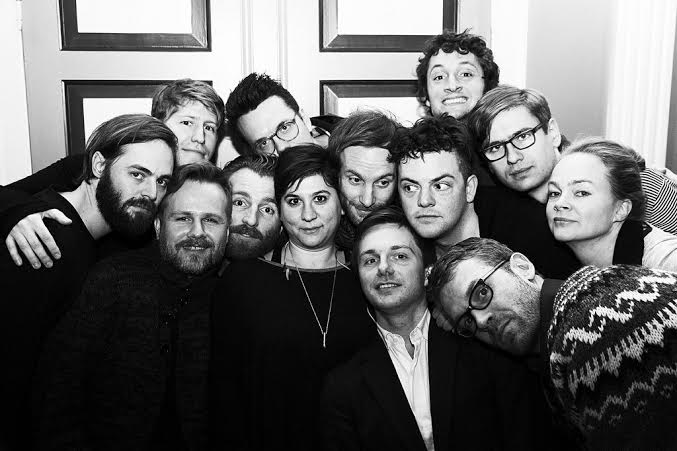
Bedroom Community

Bedroom Community is an Icelandic and American music collective and record label that was founded in 2006 by producer Valgeir Sigurðsson, alongside fellow artists Nico Muhly and Ben Frost, later adding more artists to the label. Based on the outskirts of Reykjavík, Iceland, Bedroom Community is also the home of Greenhouse Studios.

Bedroom Community was described by Drowned in Sound as "one of the best guarantors of quality, even importance, out there" known for its "emotionally powerful music"; previously, they had called it "[t]he best record label in the whole of Iceland and maybe even the entire world." The Line of Best Fit has described the label as "more of an ecosystem cultivating music than a traditional record label", claiming that "within ten years they've gone from being a side concern for a bunch of preternaturally talented composers and producers to become one of the most respected record labels in... the world?"

== Media and performances ==
In 2011, Pierre-Alain Giraud made a documentary film called Everything Everywhere All The Time, which follows Sam Amidon, Ben Frost, Nico Muhly, and Valgeir Sigurðsson on their collective tour, showcasing the music they've collaborated on and released individually under the Bedroom Community umbrella. The documentary was premiered at the Reykjavík International Film Festival, followed by screenings at places such as CPH:DOX and Iceland Airwaves.

In 2016, to celebrate the label's 10th anniversary, a number of artists embarked on another Whale Watching Tour - this time travelling to the USA. Bedroom Community founder Valgeir Sigurðsson commented that: "The Whale Watching Tour is an opportunity to manifest what we, as a record label and a collective of disparate musical personalities, do...to create something uniquely belonging to the live experience, from source material that is very familiar to us.These shows are fuelled by joyful energy and appreciation for each other, but also tension, blood and sweat that makes it all the more rewarding at the end of the day."

At Iceland Airwaves 2016, Bedroom Community performed music from their back catalogue with Crash Ensemble, the Iceland Symphony Orchestra and conductor André De Ridder at Harpa. Ja Ja Ja Music said that the performance was 'Diverse and powerful", adding that "there was something to surprise [sic] and arrest at every stage of the evening's programme, serving as a great testament to everything the label has achieved over the last 10 years, and an enticing statement of intent for what is surely to come."

== Artists ==
- Valgeir Sigurðsson
- Nico Muhly
- Ben Frost
- Paul Corley
- Sam Amidon
- Daníel Bjarnason
- Puzzle Muteson
- Nadia Sirota
- James McVinnie
- Emily Hall
- Manchester Collective
- Rakhi Singh

=== Associates ===
- Daniel Lopatin
- Jónsi
- Nathan Salon
- Tim Hecker

== Releases ==
- 2021: Jónsi: Obsidian
- 2021: Valgeir Sigurðsson: Kvika
- 2020: Lyra Pramuk: Fountain
- 2020: Tilman Robinson: Culturecide
- 2019: Viktor Orri Árnason & Yair Elazar Glotman: Vast
- 2019: Daniel Pioro: Dust
- 2019: Costyoume: Pan
- 2018: Nakata7: Cholera
- 2018: Sam Slater: Wrong Airport Ghost
- 2018: Puzzle Muteson: Swum
- 2018: aYia: aYia
- 2017: Valgeir Sigurðsson: Dissonance
- 2017: Crash Ensemble: Ghosts
- 2017: Nadia Sirota: Tessellatum
- 2017: James McVinnie: Cycles_1
- 2016: Ben Frost: The Wasp Factory
- 2016: aYia: Water Plant
- 2016: Nico Muhly: Keep In Touch
- 2016: Nico Muhly & Valgeir Sigurðsson: Scent Opera
- 2015: Oneohtrix Point Never: Garden of Delete
- 2015: Jodie Landau and Wild Up: You of All Things
- 2015: Emily Hall: Folie à Deux
- 2014: Ben Frost: V A R I A N T
- 2014: Puzzle Muteson: Theatrics
- 2014: Ben Frost: A U R O R A
- 2013: Daníel Bjarnason: Over Light Earth
- 2013: James McVinnie: Cycles
- 2013: Frost & Sigurðsson & Muhly & Amidon: "Everything Everywhere All The Time" / "Whale Watching Tour"
- 2013: Nadia Sirota: Baroque
- 2012: Nico Muhly: Drones
- 2012: Paul Corley: Disquiet
- 2012: Valgeir Sigurðsson: Architecture of Loss
- 2011: Ben Frost & Daníel Bjarnason: Sólaris
- 2011: Puzzle Muteson: En Garde
- 2010: Nico Muhly: I Drink The Air Before Me
- 2010: Sam Amidon: I See The Sign
- 2010: Valgeir Sigurðsson: Draumalandið
- 2010: Daníel Bjarnason: Processions
- 2009: Ben Frost: By The Throat
- 2008: Nico Muhly: Mothertongue
- 2007: Sam Amidon: All is Well
- 2007: Valgeir Sigurðsson: Ekvílíbrium
- 2007: Ben Frost: Theory of Machines
- 2006: Nico Muhly: Speaks Volumes
