= Miró Quartet =

The Miró Quartet is an internationally performing professional classical string quartet based in Austin, Texas. The group is the Quartet-in-Residence at the University of Texas and its members are on the faculty of the Butler School of Music. Its members are Daniel Ching, violin; William Fedkenheuer (formerly of the Borromeo String Quartet and Fry Street Quartet), second violin (replacing Sandy Yamamoto); John Largess, viola; and Joshua Gindele, cello.

The Quartet was founded in 1995 by four students at the Oberlin Conservatory of Music. In 1997, two members left the group and were replaced by two new members who have remained in the group until this day.

Within the first five years of its founding, it had won first prizes in all the competitions it entered, including the Fischoff National Chamber Music Competition (1996), the 6th Banff International String Quartet Competition (1998) and the Naumburg Chamber Music Award (2000). It was awarded Chamber Music America's prestigious Cleveland Quartet Award in 2005 and was also the first ensemble to receive the Avery Fisher Career Grant in that same year.

The Miró Quartet regularly tours throughout North America, Asia, and Europe. It is a frequent performer in major American festivals such as the Santa Fe Chamber Music Festival, Chamber Music Northwest, La Jolla Summerfest and Orcas Island Chamber Music Festival. It has collaborated with Pinchas Zukerman, Joshua Bell, Midori, Leif Ove Andsnes, Jon Kimura Parker, Eliot Fisk, and other noted musicians.

Its discography includes a recording of George Crumb's Black Angels that was awarded a Diapason d'Or award in 2004. The Quartet recorded music of Felix Mendelssohn and Franz Schubert with cellist Matt Haimovitz in 2003, which was mentioned six years later in The New York Times. In 2005, they released a recording of all six Opus 18 quartets of Beethoven.

== Recordings ==
- Schubert, Arpeggione Sonata and String Quintet (with Matt Haimovitz and Itamar Golan) (Pentatone Oxingale Series, 2016)
- Home (Pentatone, 2024)
- Ginastera, String Quartets (Pentatone, 2025)
- Hearth (Pentatone, 2025)
