= James McVinnie =

English organist

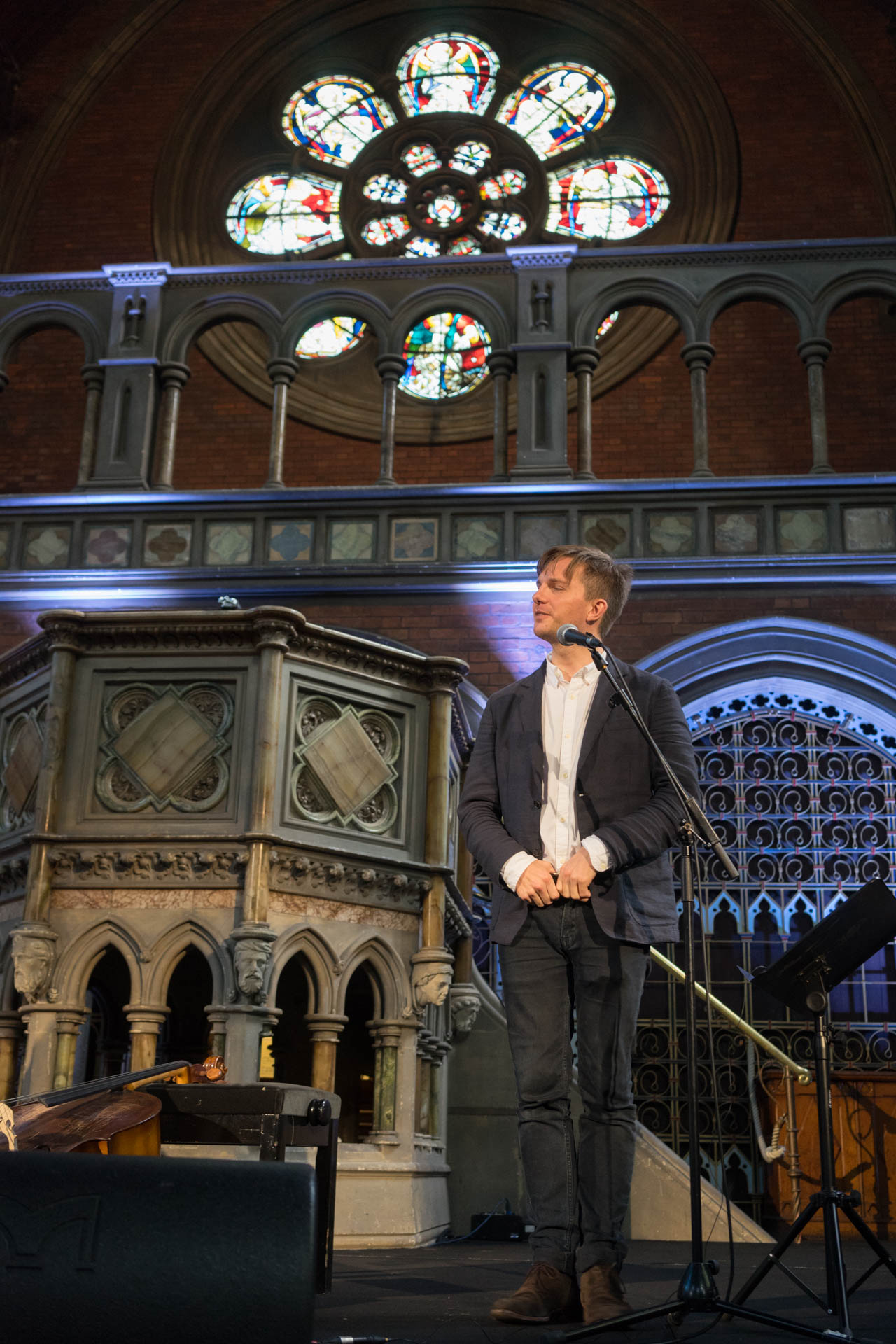
James McVinnie in 2014

James McVinnie (born 13 January 1983) is an English organist and pianist.

His work as a performer encompasses music from the 16th century to the present day. He has collaborated with many leading figures in new music including Philip Glass, Tom Jenkinson/Squarepusher, Angelique Kidjo, Nico Muhly, Martin Creed, David Lang, Richard Reed Parry, Bryce Dessner, Darkstar and Jonny Greenwood, many of whom have written large scale works for him.

James McVinnie is a member of Icelandic record label Bedroom Community. Cycles, his debut recording of music written for him by Nico Muhly, was released on this label in 2013. An album of music by Philip Glass, The Grid, was released on Orange Mountain Music in 2018. An album of music by Tom Jenkinson/Squarepusher was released on Warp Records in September 2019 recorded at the organ of Royal Festival Hall, London. In 2025, his album Dreamcatcher, featuring music by Muhly, John Adams, Meredith Monk and others, was released on the Pentatone label.

James McVinnie was Assistant Organist of Westminster Abbey between 2008 and 2011. Prior to this appointment, he held similar positions at St Paul's Cathedral, St Albans Cathedral, and Clare College, Cambridge, where he studied music. His teachers were Sarah Baldock, Thomas Trotter and Hans Fagius. He made his debut at London's Royal Festival Hall in March 2014, giving one of the six reopening recitals on the refurbished iconic 1954 Harrison & Harrison organ. He made his solo debut in the Salzburg Festival at age 26 performing with the Freiburg Baroque Orchestra under Ivor Bolton.

== Discography ==
- Bach: Clavier-Übung III (2026) - PENTATONE
- Infinity Gradient (2025) - Erased Tapes
- Dreamcatcher (2025) - PENTATONE
- Ellen Reid Soundwalk (2024) - New Amsterdam
- Counterpoint (2021) - Bedroom Community
- All Night Chroma (2019) - Warp Records
- Philip Glass: The Grid (2018) - Orange Mountain Music
- Cycles_1 (2017) - Bedroom Community
- Handel: Saul (live on DVD from Glyndebourne, 2015) - Opus Arte
- Cycles (2013) - Bedroom Community
- Baroque (2012) - Bedroom Community
- I was glad: Sacred choral music of Stanford and Parry (2012) - Vivat
- Allegri: Miserere & the music of Rome (2010) - Hyperion records
- Handel: Theodora (live on DVD from Salzburg Festival, 2009) - Naxos
- Ralph Vaughan Williams: Mass in G minor (2009) - Naxos
- John Taverner: Ex Maria Virgine (2008) - Naxos
- S S Wesley: Organ Works (2007) - Naxos
- S S Wesley: Choral Works (2006) - Naxos
- Voices: Music by Tarik O'Regan (2005) - Collegium
- John Rutter: Mass of the Children (2005) - Naxos
- Lo the full final sacrifice (2003) - Lammas
