= Mixed Messages (Muhly) =

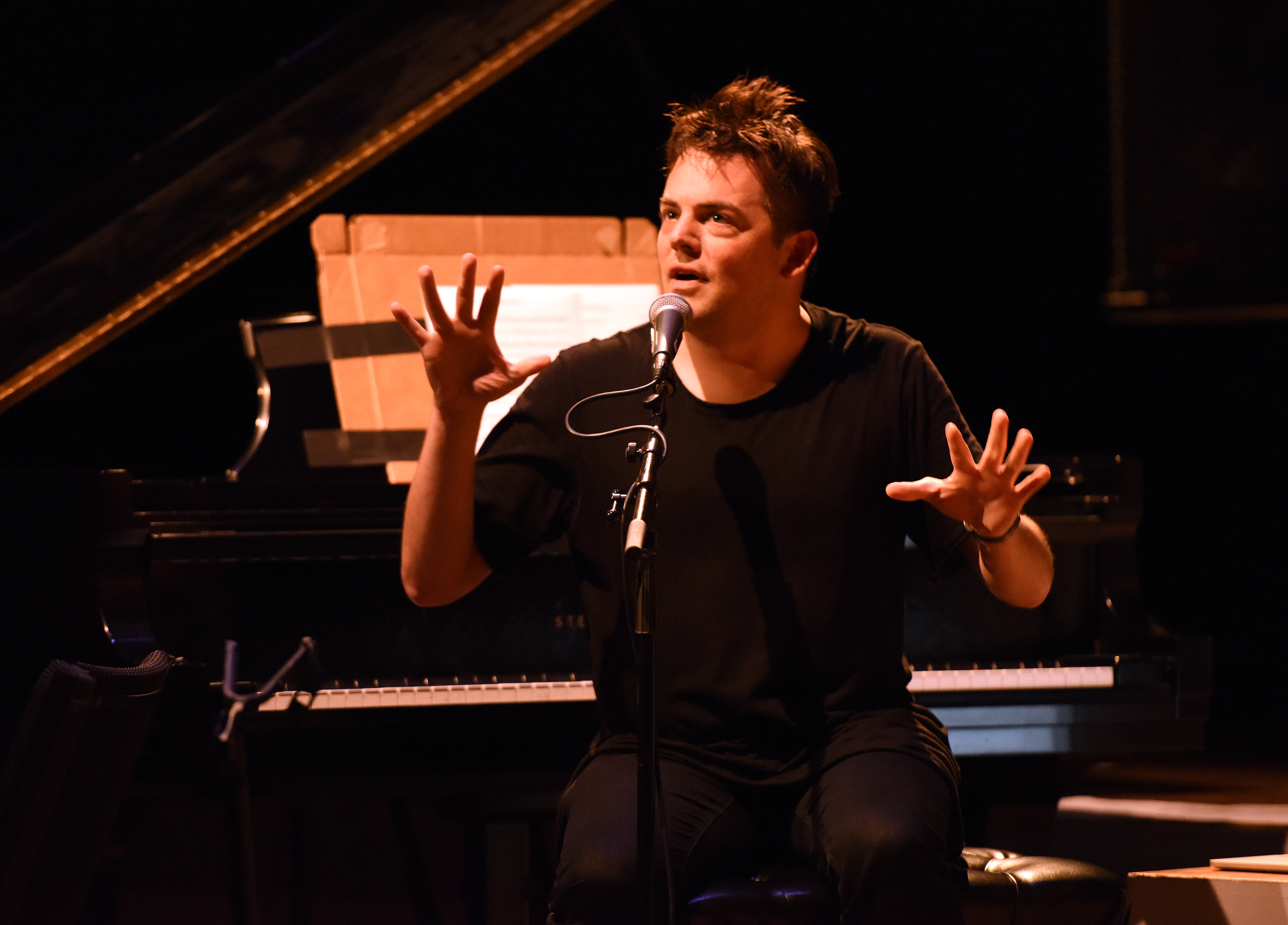
Nico Muhly in 2014

Mixed Messages is a single-movement composition for orchestra by the American composer Nico Muhly. The work was commissioned by the Philadelphia Orchestra and was premiered in Philadelphia on May 13, 2015, by the Philadelphia Orchestra under the conductor Yannick Nézet-Séguin.

== Composition ==
Mixed Messages has a duration of roughly 11 minutes and is composed in one continuous movement.

=== Instrumentation ===
The work is scored for an orchestra comprising two flutes, piccolo, two oboes, cor anglais, two clarinets, bass clarinet, two bassoons, contrabassoon, four horns, three trumpets, two tenor trombones, bass trombone, tuba, timpani, four percussionists, harp, piano (doubling celesta), and strings.

== Reception ==
Reviewing the world premiere, David Patrick Stearns of The Philadelphia Inquirer wrote, "Muhly's Mixed Messages has an intriguing title - but there's nothing murky in this knock-out orchestral showpiece that does the work of a Berlioz overture but in 21st-century post-minimalist terms." Stearns added, "A bedrock of propulsive rhythms enjoys playful counterpoint with whatever is unfolding on top, all orchestrated in a quasi-Rachmaninoff sound envelope. The orchestra is still wrapping its fingers around it. But Muhly has written a piece that weds dazzling invention with practical function." Russell Platt of The New Yorker similarly described the piece as "Nico Muhly at his best" and wrote, "after beginning with a frenzied outburst in the brass, [Muhly] continually changes focus, bringing the different departments of the orchestra into conflict with each other while maintaining an unstoppable sense of forward motion." Anthony Tommasini of The New York Times further remarked:

The piece opens with fractured brassy fanfares countered by tremulous string ostinatos that slip into bursts of subdued, frenetic arpeggio-like figures. Contradictions keep happening: low rumbling strings bump against snarling brass; fitful phrases in one bastion of the orchestra blithely overlap cosmic sonorities in another. Mr. Muhly’s ear for dense, layered, post-tonal harmonies, a trademark of his style, served him well here. The urgency of the piece carries you along, even when unexpected things happen, like a curious episode for pleading, lyrical cellos.

Conversely, John Allison of The Daily Telegraph described Muhly as a "flavour-of-the-month composer" and wrote, "[Muhly] knows how to write for big orchestral forces, but he produces empty, post-minimalist soundscapes, and there seems to be no message at all in his music." Tim Ashley of The Guardian gave the piece a more mixed review, remarking:

A study in ambiguity and contrariety, Mixed Messages is essentially an eclectic post-Romantic/minimalist fusion, ushered in by whizzing string figurations pitched somewhere between Sibelius and John Adams, and dependent for its impact on the garish juxtaposition of conflicted material for the traditional orchestral groupings. It overstays its welcome a little, and the tension dips towards the deliberately perfunctory end, but it's nicely tailored both to the orchestra's prowess and its distinctive, glamorous sound, all plush strings, virile-sounding brass and mellow woodwind.
