= Nico Muhly =

American composer (born 1981)

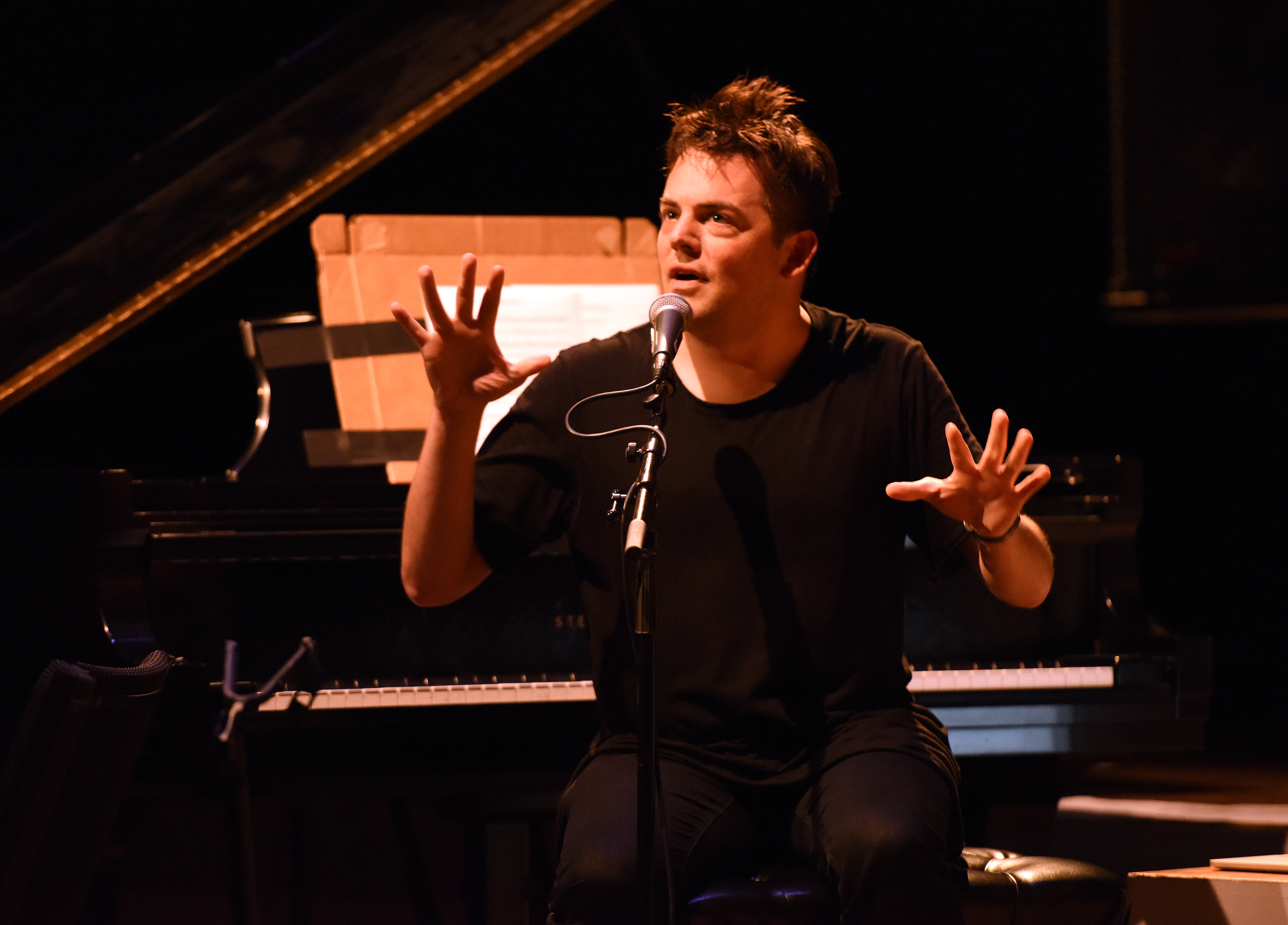
- Muhly in 2014

Background information
- Born: Nico Asher Muhly; August 26, 1981 (age 45); Vermont, United States
- Origin: New York City
- Genres: Contemporary classical; indie rock; experimental; film score
- Occupations: Composer; musician
- Years active: 2005–present
- Labels: Bedroom Community, Nonesuch, Decca Classics
- Website: www.nicomuhly.com
- Education: Columbia University (BA); Juilliard School (MM)

Nico Asher Muhly (/ˈniːkoʊ ˈmjuːli/; born August 26, 1981) is an American contemporary classical music composer and arranger who has worked and recorded with both classical and pop musicians. A prolific composer, he has composed for many notable symphony orchestras and chamber ensembles and has had two operas commissioned by the Metropolitan Opera. Since 2006, he has released nine studio albums, many of which are collaborative, including 2017's Planetarium with Sufjan Stevens, Bryce Dessner & James McAlister. He is a member of the Icelandic music collective and record label Bedroom Community.

== Biography ==
=== Early years and personal life ===
Muhly was born in Vermont to Bunny Harvey, a painter and teacher at Wellesley College, and Frank Muhly, a documentary filmmaker. Muhly was raised in Providence, Rhode Island, and sang in the choir at Grace Episcopal Church in Providence. He began studying piano at age 10.

Muhly went on to study at the Wheeler School in Providence. As part of a dual-degree program, he attended Columbia University and the Juilliard School. He graduated from the former in 2003 with a Bachelor of Arts in English and received a Master's degree in music in 2004 from Juilliard, where he studied composition with John Corigliano and Christopher Rouse.

In 2014, Muhly told the New York Times that he lived on the Lower East Side of Manhattan in New York City with his boyfriend of several years, Ben Wyskida, a political consultant. He wrote about his mental-health problems in 2015.

=== Career ===
As a first-year master's student at Juilliard at age 22, Muhly began working for Philip Glass as an archivist, and later an editor, conductor, and keyboardist, for eight years.

Muhly worked in collaboration with Björk on the DVD single "Oceania" in 2004; in 2005, he was commissioned by Colorado Academy, a private school in Colorado, to write a song for the opening of their Fine Arts building.

In 2006, he scored the series finale for the MTV2 comedy show Wonder Showzen. That same year, he released his first album of works, titled Speaks Volumes. In 2008, his second album was released, titled Mothertongue.

In a 2007 interview with Molly Sheridan on NewMusicBox, Muhly explained that while he considers himself a classical music composer, that does not preclude his working in a variety of musical genres: "It's essentially like being from somewhere. I feel like I'm very proudly from the classical tradition. It's like being from Nebraska. Like you are from there if you're from there. It doesn't mean that you can't have a productive life somewhere else. The notion of your genre being something that you have to actively perform, I think is pretty vile."

In 2009, Muhly did choral and string quartet arrangements for four of the songs on Brooklyn-based indie rock band Grizzly Bear's third album, Veckatimest, and he worked with Antony and the Johnsons on the albums The Crying Light and Swanlights.

In 2009 Muhly was co-commissioned with Valgeir Sigurdsson by Works and Process at the Guggenheim to compose the music for Green Aria, A ScentOpera, created and directed by Stewart Matthew, that featured scents as dramatis personae that were streamed from "scent microphones."

Muhly worked on two commissions for the UK-based Britten Sinfonia, performed in January and February 2010. Gilmore International Keyboard Festival commissioned "Drones & Piano" for pianist Bruce Brubaker, which premiered in May 2010.

Muhly's opera Two Boys, a collaboration with librettist Craig Lucas and directed by Bartlett Sher, premiered in June 2011 at the English National Opera and made its Metropolitan Opera debut on October 21, 2013. According to a 2008 New York Times article, the opera is based on a late-1990s British case involving a 14-year-old boy taking on the online identity of women to try to get someone to kill him, without success. However, in a 2008 interview with The Advocate, Muhly stated that the opera is based on the true story of an online friendship between two male teenagers, one of whom stabs the other. The opera was reworked both before and after its 2011 premiere. The first recording of the piece, from the Met production, was released on Nonesuch Records in 2014.

The Saint Paul Chamber Orchestra, the Minnesota Commissioning Club, Cantus, the Andrew W. Mellon Foundation, and Alfred P. and Ann M. Moore commissioned Luminous Body, also a collaboration with librettist Craig Lucas. The piece premiered on September 9, 2011.

In 2013, he toured with Glen Hansard. They performed together with the BBC Scottish Symphony Orchestra in Eindhoven and Amsterdam.

His 2008 musical collaboration Confessions with Faroese singer-songwriter Teitur was released in 2016 by Nonesuch Records.

Muhly contributed to the 2018 re-recording of David Bowie's 1987 album Never Let Me Down.

Muhly composed the musical score for the Paris Opera Ballet's production of Clear, Loud, Bright, Forward choreographed by Benjamin Millepied. It was featured in the 2015 film Reset.

In 2020 Muhly completed a "virtual premiere" for the San Francisco Symphony during the COVID-19 pandemic, titled Throughline. The 19-minute piece features eight collaborative artists selected by Music Director Esa-Pekka Salonen. Muhly also composed and recorded Trombone Phrases for Sound World’s Coronavirus Fund for Freelance Musicians, a project supporting struggling musicians during the UK's COVID-19 lockdown. It was released by Sound World as part of the album Reflections (credited to Sound World and the Bristol Ensemble) alongside specially written pieces by other composers such as Gavin Bryars, Mark-Anthony Turnage, Evelyn Glennie and Sally Beamish.

His composition for full choir and 12 guitars How Little You Are for Conspirare Company of Voices, Los Angeles Guitar Quartet, Dublin Guitar Quartet and Texas Guitar Quartet commissioned by Texas Performing Arts at The University of Texas at Austin was released on Conspiriare's 2020 album The Singing Guitar.

In 2021 his composition Shrink appeared on Violinist Pekka Kuusisto's album First Light released by Pentatone.

Muhly has worked closely with the British vocal ensemble The Tallis Scholars, which in 2022 premiered a substantial 25-minute choral work, No Resting Place, to verses from the Lamentations. In 2023, he composed A Glorious Creature for the ensemble.

His concerto for two pianos and orchestra, In Certain Circles, premiered in 2021 and made its American debut in 2022 with the New York Philharmonic. In 2025 Marin Alsop and the New York Philharmonic with violinist Renaud Capuçon premiered Muhly's Violin Concerto (2024) at David Geffen Hall at Lincoln Center.

== Compositions and projects ==
Choral

- 2003 Set Me as a Seal
- 2004 First Service
- 2004 Like as the Hart
- 2005 A Good Understanding
- 2005 Bright Mass with Canons
- 2005 Expecting the Main Things from You
- 2005 I Cannot Attain Unto It
- 2006 The Sweets of Evening
- 2007 Syllables
- 2008 Pater Noster
- 2008 Senex Puerum Portabat
- 2009 I Drink the Air Before Me
- 2011 Luminous Body
- 2011 Grief Is the Price We Pay for Love
- 2013 An Outrage (BBC commission)
- 2014 Sentences
- 2014 Let all the world in every corner sing
- 2022 Westminster Service
- 2022 No Resting Place
- 2023 A Glorious Creature
- 2024 This Other Spring
- 2026 That Great Architect

Film

- 2006 Choking Man
- 2006 Cricket Head
- 2007 Joshua
- 2006 Wonder Showzen, "Clarence Special Report"
- 2008 The Reader
- 2009 Felicitas
- 2011 Margaret
- 2013 Kill Your Darlings
- 2017 How to Talk to Girls at Parties
- 2017 Far From the Tree
- 2018 The Seagull
- 2020 Worth
- 2020 Gift of Fire
- 2021 The Humans
- 2025: The Librarians

Television

- 2017 Howards End
- 2022 Pachinko

Opera

- 2010 Dark Sisters
- 2011 Two Boys
- 2017 Marnie

Incidental

- 2005 Iphigenia at Aulis
- 2007 The Magnificent Cuckold
- 2008 Prayer for My Enemy

Orchestra

- 2001–2002 Fits & Bursts
- 2003 Out of the Loop
- 2004 By All Means
- 2004 So to Speak
- 2006 It Remains to Be Seen
- 2006 Wish You Were Here
- 2007 From Here on Out
- 2008 Step Team
- 2009 The Only Tune
- 2009 Drones on O Lord, Whose Mercies Numberless
- 2009 Impossible Things
- 2010 Detailed Instructions
- 2011 Edge of the World
- 2012 So Far So Good
- 2012 Gait (BBC commission)
- 2013 Bright Mass with Cannons
- 2015 Mixed Messages
- 2020 Throughline (San Francisco Symphony Orchestra commission)

Orchestra & Soloist

- 2005 Keep in Touch, for viola and orchestra (or tape)
- 2007 Seeing is Believing, for six-string electric violin and chamber orchestra
- 2012 Cello Concerto
- 2012 Double Standard, for two percussionists and orchestra
- 2014 Viola Concerto
- 2014 Seeing is Believing, for six-string electric violin and orchestra
- 2017 Register (Concerto for Organ and Orchestra)
- 2018 Reliable Sources, for bassoon and orchestra
- 2019 Cello Cycles
- 2020 In Certain Cycles, Concerto for Two Pianos and Orchestra
- 2021 Shrink, Concerto for Violin and String Orchestra
- 2025 Violin Concerto

Piano

- 2003 Three Études for Piano
- 2005 A Hudson Cycle
- 2005 Pillaging Music
- 2007 Skip Town
- 2010 Drones & Piano
- 2012 You Can't Get There From Here

Percussion

- 2002 Beaming Music
- 2003 Time After Time
- 2005 Ta & Clap
- 2006 It's About Time
- 2008 I Shudder to Think

Small ensemble

- 2002 Beaming Music
- 2003 Clear Music
- 2003 Flexible Music
- 2003 Duet No 1: Chorale Pointing Downwards
- 2003 Reading into it
- 2004 By All Means
- 2004 You Could Have Asked Me
- 2004 Ta and Clap
- 2005 The Elements of Style
- 2005 Stride
- 2005 Pillaging Music
- 2006 How About Now
- 2006 Fast Music with Folk Songs
- 2007 I Know Where Everything Is
- 2007 Principles of Uncertainty
- 2008 Triade
- 2008 Mothertongue
- 2008 Wonders
- 2008 The Only Tune
- 2008 Common Ground
- 2009 I Drink the Air Before Me
- 2009 Motion
- 2009 Farewell Photography
- 2010 Diacritical Marks
- 2010 Drones & Piano
- 2011 Drones & Viola
- 2012 Drones & Violin
- 2012 Doublespeak
- 2014 Fast Dances
- 2015 Look For Me
- 2017 Planetarium

Solo

- 2002 Radiant Music
- 2003 Honest Music
- 2003 A Long Line
- 2005 Keep in Touch
- 2005 Pillaging Music
- 2005 It Goes without Saying

Voice

- 2003 Employment
- 2005 The Elements of Style
- 2007 Mothertongue
- 2007 Wonders
- 2007 The Only Tune
- 2008 The Adulteress
- 2009 Drones on "O Lord, Whose Mercies Numberless"
- 2009 Vocalise on "Al lampo dell' armi"
- 2009 Impossible Things
- 2010 Let the Night Perish (Job's Curse)
- 2011 The Map of the World
- 2011 Four Traditional Songs
- 2012 Two Hearts, for voice, violin and orchestra
- 2012 Far Away Songs
- 2012 Hymns For Private Use
- 2012 Three Songs
- 2013 The Brown Girl
- 2013 Reynardine
- 2013 So Many Things
- 2014 Pleasure Ground
- 2014 Sentences
- 2016 Two Songs
- 2018 Land in an Isle
- 2019 Death in Venice
- 2019 My Pretty Saro
- 2019 The Only Tune
- 2019 Unexpected News

=== Arrangements and orchestrations ===
- 2006 The Letting Go by Bonnie 'Prince' Billy
- 2007 Miserere Mei (orchestration of William Byrd's Miserere Mei)
- 2007 Deus and Bow Thine Ear (orchestration of William Byrd's Deus and Bow Thine Ear)
- 2008 All Is Well by Sam Amidon
- 2008 "Með þér" and "Á meðan vatnið velgist" on Bestu kveðjur by Sprengjuhöllin
- 2009 Confessions, a multimedia collaboration with Teitur Lassen.
- 2009 Various songs on Antony and the Johnsons' album The Crying Light
- 2009 Various songs on Grizzly Bear's album Veckatimest
- 2009 Tricks of the Trade on Mew's album No More Stories...
- 2009 Year of the Dragon on Run Rabbit Run
- 2009 "So Far Around The Bend" by The National on Dark Was the Night
- 2010 Various songs on Antony and the Johnsons' album Swanlights
- 2010 Go by Jónsi
- 2010 "I See the Sign" by Sam Amidon
- 2012 "Climax" on Looking 4 Myself by Usher
- 2010 String arrangements on Antony and the Johnsons' album Cut the World
- 2013 For Now I Am Winter by Ólafur Arnalds
- 2015 "Anecdotes" on Joanna Newsom's album Divers
- 2017 "Fortunate Son", collaboration with Villagers
- 2021 "If I'm Insecure" on James Blake's album Friends That Break Your Heart

== Discography ==
=== Studio albums ===
Title	Year	Details
Speaks Volumes	2006	Released: September 10, 2006; Label: Bedroom Community; Format: CD, digital
Mothertongue	2008	Released: June 16, 2008; Label: Bedroom Community, Brassland (North America only); Format: CD, digital
I Drink the Air Before Me	2010	Released: September 6, 2010; Label: Bedroom Community, Decca/Universal Classics; Format: CD, digital; Original dance score
Drones	2012	Released: November 19, 2012; Label: Bedroom Community; Format: CD, digital; Three previous EPs combined
Glass: In the Summer House - Mad Rush / Nico Muhly: Four Studies - Honest Music (with Angela Chun & Jennifer Chun)	2016	Released: April 15, 2016; Label: Harmonia Mundi USA; Format: CD, digital
Keep In Touch (with Nadia Sirota)	2016	Released: September 30, 2016; Label: Bedroom Community; Format: CD, digital
Confessions (with Teitur)	2016	Released: October 21, 2016; Label: Nonesuch Records; Format: LP, CD, digital
Planetarium (with Bryce Dessner, James McAlister & Sufjan Stevens)	2017	Released: June 9, 2017; Label: 4AD; Format: LP, CD, digital
Peter Pears: Balinese Ceremonial Music (with Thomas Bartlett)	2018	Released: May 18, 2018; Label: Nonesuch Records; Format: CD, digital

=== EPs ===
Title	Year	Details
Drones & Piano	2012	Released: May 21, 2012; Label: Bedroom Community
Drones & Viola	2012	Released: July 23, 2012; Label: Bedroom Community
Drones & Violin	2012	Released: August 27, 2010; Label: Bedroom Community
Object Songs (with Maira Kalman)	2015	Released: February 10, 2016; Label: Cooper Hewitt Design Museum
Scent Opera (with Valgeir Sigurðsson)	2016	Released: August 5, 2016; Label: Bedroom Community; Format: CD, digital
Peter Pears: Balinese Ceremonial Music Remixes (with Thomas Bartlett)	2018	Released: 2018; Label: Nonesuch Records

=== Singles ===
As primary artist

Title	Year	Album
"The Mezzo-Soprano's Song" (with Lemony Snicket & Maira Kalman)	2010	non-album single
"Saturn" (with Sufjan Stevens, Bryce Dessner & James McAlister)	2017	Planetarium
"Mercury" (with Sufjan Stevens, Bryce Dessner & James McAlister)	2017	Planetarium
"Do It" (as remix artist; original artist: Rae Morris)	2017	non-album singles
"Fortunate Child" (with Villagers)	2017	non-album singles
"In This House" (with San Fermin & Attacca Quartet)	2020	non-album singles

=== As composer ===
Opera, chorale, and chamber works

- FM by Flexible Music (2009) (track: "Flexible Music")
- A Good Understanding by Los Angeles Master Chorale (Decca/Universal Classics, 2010)
- From Here On Out by Kitchener-Waterloo Symphony (2011) (tracks: From Here On Out and "Wish You Were Here")
- Seeing is Believing by the Aurora Orchestra (Decca/Universal Classics, 2011)
- Cycles by James McVinnie (Bedroom Community, 2013)
- Two Boys from the Metropolitan Opera production (Nonesuch Records, 2014)
- Filament by Eighth Blackbird (2015) (tracks: "Doublespeak" and "Two Pages")
- Dawn to Dust by Utah Symphony (2016) (track: Control (Five Landscapes for Orchestra))
- Variations by Mishka Rushdie Momen (Somm Recordings, 2019) (track: Small Variations)
- Three Continents Cello Concerto by Jan Vogler (Sony Classical, 2020) (with Sven Helbig & Zhou Long)
- Useful expressions - Codeshare

Film scores

- Joshua (Original Motion Picture Soundtrack) (Moviescore Media, 2008)
- The Reader (Original Motion Picture Soundtrack) (Lakeshore Records, 2009)
- Kill Your Darlings (Original Motion Picture Soundtrack) (2013)
- Howards End (Original Soundtrack Album) (miniseries, 2018)
- Pachinko Season 1 (Original Soundtrack Album) (Apple TV+ Original Series, 2022)

=== As arranger ===
- Seeing is Believing by Thomas Gould & Aurora Orchestra (Decca, 2011)
