= Live at Gamla Bíó =

Live album by Low Roar
- Released: July 3, 2015
- Recorded: November 8, 2014
- Venue: Gamla Bíó (Reykjavík, Iceland)
- Genre: Dream pop
- Length: 40:14
- Label: Tonequake Records
- Producer: Ryan Karazija; Andrew Scheps

Low Roar chronology
0 (2014)	Live at Gamla Bíó (2015)	Once in a Long, Long While... (2017)

Live at Gamla Bíó is the first and only live album by Icelandic musical project Low Roar, released on July 3, 2015, through Tonequake Records.

== Background ==
The album consists of live concert recordings by Low Roar at the Gamla Bíó opera house in Reykjavík during the 2014 Iceland Airwaves festival, accompanied by the Icelandic band Amiina.

== Track listing ==
All tracks are written by Ryan Karazija

No.	Title	Length
1.	"Intro"	3:01
2.	"Breathe In"	7:24
3.	"Easy Way Out"	4:25
4.	"I'll Keep Coming"	5:28
5.	"Just a Habit"	3:46
6.	"Anything You Need"	3:17
7.	"Vampire on My Fridge"	7:10
8.	"Dreamer"	5:43
Total length:		40:14

== Personnel ==
Low Roar

- Ryan Karazija – vocals, synthesizer, acoustic guitar (tracks 3–5 and 8)
- Leifur Björnsson – synthesizer
- Logi Guðmundsson – drums
- Andrew Scheps – mixing

Additional personnel

- Amiina:
  - María Huld Markan Sigfúsdóttir – violin
  - Edda Rún Ólafsdóttir – violin
  - Ólöf Júlía Kjartansdóttir – viola
  - Sólrún Sumarliðadóttir – cello
