= This Is My Hand =

This is My Hand

Studio album by My Brightest Diamond
- Released: 15 September 2014
- Genres: Indie rock, baroque pop
- Length: 43:54
- Label: Asthmatic Kitty
- Producers: Zac Rae, Shara Worden

My Brightest Diamond chronology
None More Than You (2014)	This is My Hand (2014)	Champagne (2018)

This Is My Hand is the fourth studio album from the American rock group My Brightest Diamond.

== Content ==
The ten-track album was released on translucent red and black vinyl, compact disc, and digital download with Asthmatic Kitty, in the UK on 15 September 2014 and in the US on 16 September 2014. It was produced by Zac Rae and Shara Worden, and mixed and mastered by S. Husky Hoskulds. Album layout and design is by DM Stith, and the cover photograph is by Bernd Preiml. This Is My Hand is described as percussive art-pop that incorporates elements of chamber pop and cabaret, with haunting vocals and opera theatrics. Worden wrote the album imagining a tribe of people gathered around a fire, who were making music together, telling stories and hearing stories from shaman, and it explores themes of self-acceptance, sensuality, and community. She was also reading Daniel Levitin's book The World in Six Songs, and drew inspiration from Jared Diamond's book on human evolution, The Third Chimpanzee, and Matthew Barney and Jonathan Bepler's operatic and experimental film, River of Fundament, which Worden recorded for, while she was writing This Is My Hand. The album draws comparison to the music of St. Vincent, These New Puritans, and the Sufjan Steven's album Age of Adz.

The final song "Apparition" contains lyrics from French poet Stéphane Mallarmé's poem "Apparition," with Worden describing the adapted story as being about a child, who is visited and enraptured by a ghost with a hat made of light. The song "Pressure" was released as a single on 2 September 2014. The music video for "Lover/Killer" was directed by Jean-Paul Frenay and released on 27 November 2014. It features footage of a man held at gunpoint, who is blinded by a mysterious creature, and a woman who is drowned. The man fires the gun and emerges out of the water to greet himself, and the woman awakes and leaves the man behind. Frenay explains in an interview with Flood Magazine, that he "fell in love with the hypnotic mood of the song and the very suggestive and abstract lyrics. This music video is a metaphor of the rupture between the past and future, the idea of leaving something/some part of you behind to move forward, to be replaced by a new version of you."

== Reception ==
Professional ratings
Review scores
Source	Rating
Allmusic	4/5 stars
Drowned in Sound	(7/10)
The Guardian	3/5 stars
NME	4.5/5 stars
Pitchfork	(7/10)
PopMatters	7/10 stars

A review in Pitchfork says "in a frustrating bit of organization, This Is My Hand's most memorable moments are front loaded in its opening five songs[,] an invigorating progression of Worden's sonic palette, [and] the album winds down with a string of slower, ethereal oddities that blunt the concentrated pandemonium of its earlier tracks." A mixed review by Consequence of Sound notes that the album "prevails as a strong hallmark for Worden's diverse background, exacting her signature theatrical drama and indie rock influences. The only lapse is its inability to explore – which, in going by her unconventional background, Worden seems more than capable of doing." The Guardian says This Is My Hand remains "furiously artsy[,] with intense songs, sung with a crystalline elasticity, hav[ing] located the mojo previously absent from My Brightest Diamond's art."

A positive review from NME calls the song "Lover Killer" "entic[ing] with ghostly vocals until a brassy beat snaps the listener in half with its psychedelic stomp," summarizing that This Is My Hand "should see her join [...] the US experimental pop pantheon." For the single "Pressure," Stereogum writes that it is filled "with an army of percussive sounds from big drums to twinkling bells along with shrieking brass and crushing synths, it's a huge production, but it all sounds small compared to Worden's operatic voice."

On the album instrumentation, Drowned in Sound describes them as "lush, dense and layered - and the arrangement of it shows how skilled of an arranger Worden must be," adding the "joyful woodwind trills and arpeggios that pepper the album are straight out of Illinoise while the haunting, expressive synthesizer work are reminiscent of [..] The Age of Adz." NPR says the albums finds Worden "wielding instruments like a series of tools, each with a discrete purpose in the construction of an abstract, heterogeneous galaxy." The album peaked on the Billboard charts on 4 October 2014, at No. 50.

== Track listing ==
No.	Title	Writer(s)	Length
1.	"Pressure"	Shara Worden	3:57
2.	"Before the Words"	Shara Worden	3:26
3.	"This Is My Hand"	Shara Worden	3:45
4.	"Lover Killer"	Helga Davis, Shara Worden, Zac Roe	3:59
5.	"I am Not the Bad Guy"	Helga Davis, Shara Worden	5:11
6.	"Looking at the Sun"	Earl Harvin, Shara Worden	3:43
7.	"Shape"	Shara Worden	4:27
8.	"So Easy"	Shara Worden	4:08
9.	"Resonance"	Earl Harvin, Shara Worden	4:24
10.	"Apparition"	music by Shara Worden, Zac Rae, lyrics by Stéphane Mallarmé	3:54
Total length:			43:54

== Personnel ==
- Timo Andres – piano and celesta
- Hideaki Aomori – alto saxophone and clarinet
- Chris Bruce – bass
- CJ Camerieri – trumpet and horn
- Michael Davis – trombone
- Casey Foubert – guitar, keyboards, autoharp and percussion
- Earl Harvin – drums and drum machine
- Khorikos Choir – gang vocals
- Megan Levin – harp
- Zac Rae – keyboards, guitar, percussion and drum programming
- Alex Sopp – flute
- DM Stith – additional vocals
- Jason Treuting – glockenspiel
- Brian Wolfe – drums and percussion
- Shara Worden – vocals, guitar, keyboards, drum programming, kalimba, wind and choral arrangements

Production

- Pat Dillett – wind instrument recording
- Casey Foubert – drum recording
- David Groener – wind instrument recording assistance
- Joel Hamburger – choir recording
- S. Husky Hoskulds – mixing and mastering
- Giovanni Nicoletta – drum recording
- Bernd Preiml – cover photograph
- Zac Rae – production, drum recording vocal recording and editing
- John Smerek – vocal recording
- DM Stith – album layout and design
- Lawson White – vocal editing
- Shara Worden – production, vocal recording and editing
