= Unremembered =

Studio album by Sarah Kirkland Snider (composer)
- Released: September 4, 2015
- Genre: Classical
- Length: 51:22
- Label: New Amsterdam Records
- Producer: Lawson White and Sarah Kirkland Snider

Unremembered is an album composed by Sarah Kirkland Snider which "sets poetry by New-York-based poet/writer Nathaniel Bellows, recalling strange and beautiful happenings experienced during a childhood in rural Massachusetts."

It features the vocals of Shara Nova, DM Stith, and Padma Newsom.

== Track listing ==
All tracks composed by Sarah Kirkland Snider with lyrics by Nathaniel Bellows.

1. "Prelude" – 2:43
2. "The Estate" – 3:35
3. "The Barn" – 4:25
4. "The Guest" – 4:44
5. "The Slaughterhouse" – 4:45
6. "The Girl" – 2:53
7. "The Swan" – 3:58
8. "The Witch" – 6:30
9. "The River" – 3:43
10. "The Speakers" – 3:54
11. "The Orchard" – 4:15
12. "The Song" – 3:35
13. "The Past" – 5:42

== Personnel ==
The personnel are as follows.

Conductor:

- Edwin Outwater

Vocals:

- Padma Newsome
- Shara Nova
- DM Stith

Oboe:

- Kathy Halvorson
- Hassan Anderson on "The Slaughterhouse" and "The Past"

English Horn:

- Slava Znatchenii
- Lauren Blackerby on "The Slaughterhouse" and "The Past"

Bassoon:

- Mike Parker Harley
- Damian Primis
- Brent Foster on "The Past"
- Allison Nicotera on "The Past"

French horn:

- Matt Marks
- Chad Yarbrough

Percussion:

- Eric Beach
- Thomas Kozumplik
- Jason Treuting
- Lawson White

Melodica:

- Lawson White

Harp:

- Nuiko Wadden

Piano:

- Timo Andres
