= All Things Will Unwind =

Studio album by My Brightest Diamond
- Released: 10 October 2011
- Genre: Indie rock
- Length: 42:13
- Label: Asthmatic Kitty
- Producers: Shara Nova, Rob Moose

My Brightest Diamond chronology
Shark Remixes Volumes 1, 2, 3 & 4 (2010)	All Things Will Unwind (2011)	None More Than You (2014)

All Things Will Unwind is the third studio album from the American rock group My Brightest Diamond.

== Content ==
The eleven-track was released with Asthmatic Kitty, on 10 October 2011. It was arranged and produced by Shara Worden, with co-production by Rob Moose. Engineering and mixing was by Pat Dillett, with assistance from Jon Altschuler and Ehren Ebbage, recording was by Zac Rae at The Bank, and mastering by UE Nastasi at Sterling Sound. Album design and layout is by DM Stith, and photography by Denny Renshaw. Worden worked on All Things Will Unwind the New York's yMusic, a chamber group that blends contemporary classical and art-pop music for the album. It contains lush compositions with woodwinds, violins, flutes, piccolos, ukuleles, synthesizers, heavy bass percussion, and operatic vocals, as well as challenging and creative lyrics. Conceptually, the album is about Detroit, Michigan, class and race, politics, and life and death.

The songs "She Does Not Brave the War (But She Saves the Day)" and "I Have Never Loved Someone" were written for Worden's then-newborn son, the latter about making an enduring legacy of love. The music video for "We Added It Up" was released on 12 October 2011, and contains footage of a pair of dancers, and a mostly silhouetted, singing Worden.

== Reception ==
Professional ratings
Review scores
Source	Rating
Allmusic	4/5 stars
Paste	(6.7/10)
Pitchfork	(6.5/10)
Popmatters	(8/10)

Paste describes the album as "pure, conventional orchestral pop. Gone are the noir-rock undertones and the bubbling tension of her earlier albums, and they are replaced in favor of unlimited access to the local orchestra's storage closet," adding "it's a heady and abstract album that feels more like it should be studied than enjoyed." A review from PopMatters call is a "deeply layered record with lots to listen to and appreciate in every sense. It's also just a lot of fun as MBD clearly enjoys being in character and seeing where the songs taker her," and Filter says it is "a cohesive trek that leaves the listener enraptured by Worden's talent and undeniable magnetism." A mixed review in Pitchfork notes that "the carefulness of All Things Will Unwind can feel impenetrable sometimes, and while her closest musical analogue is the equally ambitious Joanna Newsom, Worden lacks Newsom's oddball vulnerability," and concludes with "to be so many things, to harness and perfect so many disparate sounds-- makes her work feel more distant than it should."

== Track listing ==
All songs are written by Shara Worden, except where indicated.

No.	Title	Writer(s)	Length
1.	"We Added It Up"		4:04
2.	"Reaching Through to the Other Side"		3:41
3.	"In the Beginning"		4:19
4.	"Escape Routes"		3:27
5.	"Be Brave"		4:16
6.	"She Does Not Brave the War (But She Saves the Day)"		4:05
7.	"Ding Dang"	Tim Fite, Shara Worden	2:30
8.	"There's a Rat"		4:08
9.	"High Low Middle"	Brian Wolfe, Shara Worden	3:33
10.	"Everything Is in Line"	DM Stith, Shara Worden	4:31
11.	"I Have Never Loved Someone the Way I Love You"		3:39
Total length:			42:13

== Personnel ==
- Brad Albetta – bass, piano and Moog synth
- Thomas Bartlett – Rhodes piano on "High Low Middle"
- Tim Fite – celesta, fireball, percussion, synth bass on "Ding Dang"
- Zac Rae – marimba, pianet, prepared piano, Roland RS-09, Roland Jupiter 8, guitar, Mellotron, vibes, celesta, Wurlitzer, Orchestron and bells
- Justin Riddle – percussion on "Ding Dang"
- Brian Snow – drums
- DM Stith – vocals and acoustic guitar
- Brain Wolfe – drums
- Shara Worden – vocals, baritone ukulele, bells, Authoharp, Mbira and pump organ

=== yMusic ===
- Hideaki Aomori – clarinet and bass clarinet
- CJ Camerieri – trumpet, horn and pump organ
- Clarice Jensen
- Rob Moose – violin, guitars and banjo
- Nadia Sirota – viola
- Alex Sopp – flute and piccolo
