= Sarah Kirkland Snider =

American instrumental music composer

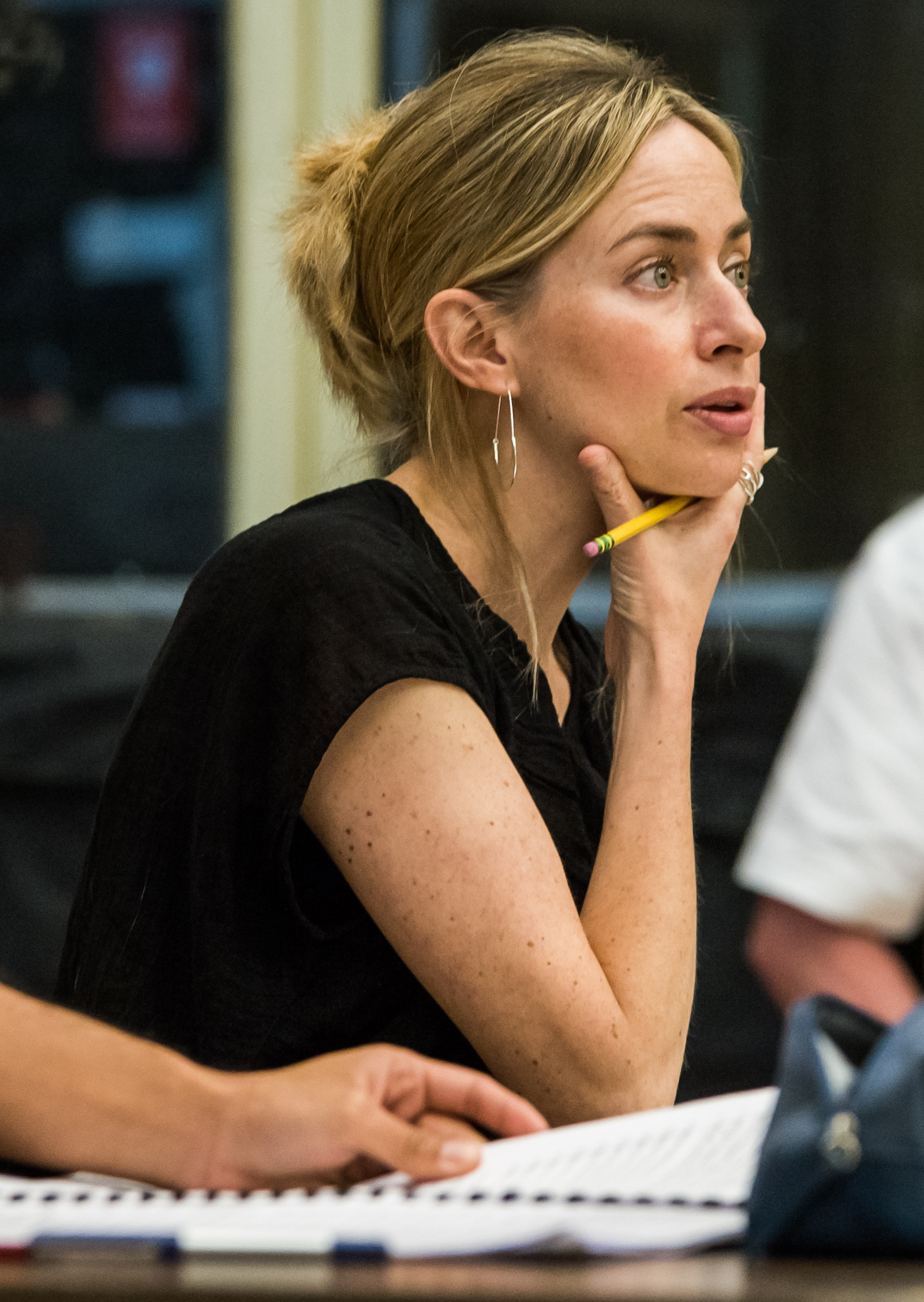
- Snider observing a rehearsal in 2018
- Born: October 8, 1973 (age 53)
- Occupations: Composer; Co-Artistic Director of New Amsterdam Records
- Website: www.sarahkirklandsnider.com

Sarah Kirkland Snider (born October 8, 1973) is an American composer. She has received critical acclaim for her chamber, orchestral, song cycle, choral, ballet, and opera works.

== Biography ==
Snider was born and raised in Princeton, New Jersey. Despite a non-musical parentage, she had a self-professed musical itch from a young age, going as far as to knock on her neighbors’ doors to play their pianos by ear. Eventually, Snider began formal music study, beginning piano at age 7 and cello at age 10. She also sang in choirs, attending five years of summer camp at the American Boychoir School where she studied under Anton Armstrong. She later attended Princeton High School, singing in a nationally celebrated high school choir under William Trego, and performing in the PHS Orchestra. She cites two female PHS Orchestra conductors as early female role models.

Snider also composed music at a young age, keeping it private until her junior year of high school when she showed her first works to her piano teacher, composer/pianist Laurie Altman, who encouraged her to study composition in college. Snider would later stylistically describe these early works as "somewhere between early Debussy and Joni Mitchell."

Snider received a BA in Psychology-Sociology from Wesleyan University, where she decided not to pursue composition because she felt her music too conservative for its experimentally-oriented program. After graduating in 1995, she moved to New York and worked at a pro-choice law firm. While considering pursuing public interest law, she began writing music for experimental theater and decided to pursue composition full-time. Snider enrolled in the composition master's program at New York University to study with composer Justin Dello Joio, whom she called "a brilliant, Nadia Boulanger-style teacher," but left after three semesters. In 2005 and 2006, she received a Master of Music and an Artist Diploma in Composition from the Yale School of Music, where she studied with Martin Bresnick, Aaron Jay Kernis, Ezra Laderman, and David Lang.

== Music ==
Snider has professed that memory, psychology, and narrative are the core themes that drive her music. In addition, she has expressed a focus in writing her music with influences and instrumentation from both non-classical and modern classical forms. She has said this stylistic diversity is not a conscious effort to flout convention, but rather her intuitive artistic expression.

In Gramophone, Pwyll ap Siôn writes that Snider’s music “explores remote psychological interiors and discursive narrative journeys.” In Pitchfork, Jayson Greene situated Snider as “perhaps the most sophisticated” voice among composers working in a genre-space “between richly orchestrated indie rock and straight chamber music.”

Snider has received particular recognition for her album releases of her classical song cycles and her Mass: Penelope (2010), Unremembered (2015), Mass for the Endangered (2020), and The Blue Hour (2022).

=== Penelope (2010) ===
Written for female voice and chamber orchestra, Penelope is an orchestral song cycle based on Homer's Odyssey, imagining the ancient Greek epic as told from the perspective of Odysseus's wife, Penelope. Penelope was originally conceived as a music-theater monodrama in 2007–2008, commissioned by the J. Paul Getty Center and scored for alto/actor and string quartet. Snider later expanded it to a song cycle, expanding and tailoring it to the unique talents of vocalist Shara Worden and the chamber orchestra Ensemble Signal, both of whom feature prominently in the reimagined work. Its lyrics were written by Ellen McLaughlin.

New Amsterdam Records, who published the album on October 26, 2010, describes the work as follows:

Inspired by Homer’s epic poem, the Odyssey, Penelope is a meditation on memory, identity, and what it means to come home. Suspended somewhere between art song, indie rock, and chamber folk, the music of Penelope moves organically from moments of elegiac strings-and-harp reflection to dusky post-rock textures with drums, guitars and electronics, all directed by a strong sense of melody and a craftsman’s approach to songwriting.

The album received widespread critical acclaim and commercial success—as of 2020, the song cycle has been performed over fifty times in North America and Europe. Pitchfork's Jayson Greene described Penelope as "a gorgeous piece of music and hauntingly vivid psychological portrait." Time Out New York named Penelope its "No. 1 Classical Album of 2010", while NPR deemed the song cycle among its "Top Five Genre-Defying Albums of 2010."

"The Lotus Eaters", the fourth song on the album, received particular attention. HuffPost named it one of the Top Ten Alternative Art Songs of 2001–2010, while NPR listed the track as among the "200 Greatest Songs Written by 21st Century Women" in 2018, eight years after its release.

=== Unremembered (2015) ===
Snider’s sophomore album, Unremembered, is scored for seven voices, chamber orchestra, and electronics, an expanded scope from Penelope. Released September 4, 2015 on New Amsterdam Records, the work was called "evocative and strangely beautiful," and "an intricately magical landscape"; a work that "attests to Ms. Snider’s thorough command of musical mood setting”.

Unremembered was named to dozens of year-end lists for Best Album, including "The Top 5 Classical Albums of 2015" in The Washington Post, The Nation, WNYC New Sounds, The Agit Reader, and critic Seth Colter Walls. It was also named one of the 50 Best Classical Works of the Past Twenty Years by Q2 Radio listeners in both 2015 and 2016.

Unremembered sets poetry by New York-based poet/writer Nathaniel Bellows, described as recalling "strange and beautiful happenings experienced during a childhood in rural Massachusetts." Shara Nova returns on vocals alongside singers Padma Newsome and DM Stith. Additionally, the album features the Unremembered Orchestra, a group of performers within New York City contemporary ensembles Alarm Will Sound, International Contemporary Ensemble, The Knights, and So Percussion), conducted by Edwin Outwater. The recording was co-produced by Snider with Lawson White and mixed by Grammy-winning producer Andrew Scheps, and made greater use of the multitracking and processing tools of the studio than did Penelope.

In 2017, vocalists Padma Newsome, Shara Nova, and DM Stith toured Unremembered in the U.S. and Europe with various orchestras and ensembles at venues including Knoxville’s Big Ears Festival (with The Knights), Liquid Music (with the St. Paul Chamber Orchestra), the SHIFT Festival (with North Carolina Symphony), and Holland’s Cross-linx Festival (with the Doelen Ensemble and Codarts Rotterdam).

=== Mass for the Endangered (2020) ===
Snider’s first Mass and third album was commissioned by Trinity Church Wall Street, the renowned New York City sacred choral institution, and released on Nonesuch Records/New Amsterdam Records on September 25, 2020. Part of Trinity’s Mass Re-Imaginings project, the work is described as "a rumination on the concept of the traditional Catholic Mass, its fidelity enhanced by Snider’s interpolation of traditional Latin text for the Gloria, Sanctus/Benedictus, and parts of the Kyrie, Credo, and Agnus Dei." The six-movement work is written for SATB choir and twelve instruments.

Thematically, NPR critic Tom Huizenga wrote that though Mass for the Endangered uses a religious framework, it instead "focuses not on our relationship to God, but instead to the flora and fauna on our planet." Snider herself describes the Mass as embodying "a prayer for endangered animals and the imperiled environments in which they live."

Snider received similarly lofty acclaim to her previous albums. Mass for the Endangered was among The Boston Globe’s "10 Reasons to Keep Falling for Classical Music" and appeared on numerous year-end lists including NPR and The Nation. Mass cemented Snider’s prominence among contemporary composers, with The New Yorker citing the composer’s "technical command and unerring knack for breathtaking beauty" and NPR proclaiming that "Snider must be recognized as one of today's most compelling composers for the human voice."

=== The Blue Hour (2022) ===
On October 14, 2022, Nonesuch Records and New Amsterdam Records co-released The Blue Hour, a collaborative song cycle. Several critics praised the effort. The Washington Post calls it “a gorgeous and remarkably unified work,”. The Boston Globe calls it “hauntingly beautiful…[with] an aura of deep personal intimacy.” NPR writes, “Stunning…The 75-minute song cycle flows seamlessly, thanks to a lush, integrated composing style adhered to [by the five composers.]”. The album was named to Best of 2022 lists by NPR (All Genres), NPR Classical, The Nation, The Boston Globe, New Sounds, I Care If You Listen, and others.

=== Hildegard (2025) ===
Hildegard is Snider’s first opera, a two-act chamber opera with her own libretto, co-commissioned by Beth Morrison Projects and the Aspen Music Festival and School. It is scored for eight singers with flute, clarinet, bassoon, harp, and string quintet. Set in 1147, it follows the abbess and composer Hildegard von Bingen as she records her visions while awaiting a papal judgment on whether she is a prophet or a heretic. She enlists the young nun Richardis von Stade to illustrate the manuscript, and the opera centers on the intense relationship that develops between the two women. The opera premiered in November 2025 in a Los Angeles Opera production at the Wallis Annenberg Center for the Performing Arts, directed by Elkhanah Pulitzer with soprano Nola Richardson in the title role. It was later performed at the Prototype Festival in New York in January 2026 and at the Aspen Music Festival in July 2026.

Mark Swed of the Los Angeles Times called the production “a rapture,” while The New York Times named the production a Critic’s Pick. Writing for the publication, Joshua Barone called the opera “gorgeously mesmerizing” and noted that it touches on themes including feminism, chronic illness, faith, and the healing power of art. In 2026, Hildegard received the Music Critics Association of North America’s award for Best New Opera, an award recognizing “both musical and theatrical excellence.”

=== Forward Into Light (2026) ===
Forward Into Light marks Snider’s fifth full-length album and her first devoted entirely to orchestral music. It was released on February 27, 2026 by Nonesuch Records and New Amsterdam Records, and recorded by Metropolis Ensemble under Andrew Cyr and produced by Silas Brown.

The album connects four works, which Snider says she grouped because they share themes of “perseverance, alliance, and evolution through dark and light”:

- the title piece Forward Into Light, a New York Philharmonic commission inspired by the American women’s suffrage movement;
- a version of Forward Into Light for string orchestra and harp, with harpist Noël Wan, of Drink the Wild Ayre, originally written for the Emerson String Quartet as its final commission;
- Eye of Mnemosyne, a multimedia work on memory and photography commissioned by the Rochester Philharmonic;
- Something for the Dark, commissioned by the Detroit Symphony Orchestra after Snider won its Lebenbom award in 2014.

In June 2026, the album was shortlisted for Germany’s Opus Klassik award in the New Classical category.

== Recognition ==
In part for the success of her first three albums of large-scale works for voices and instruments, The Washington Post named Snider one of the Top 35 Female Composers in Classical Music in 2019. Elsewhere, she has been cited by critics as "a significant figure on the American music landscape", "an important representative of 21st century trends in composition," and in a 2026 review for Musical America, Clive Paget called her “one of America’s most individual talents.”

Her music has been performed by the New York Philharmonic, Boston Symphony Orchestra, Cleveland Orchestra, San Francisco Symphony, National Symphony Orchestra, Detroit Symphony Orchestra, Philharmonia Orchestra, Britten Sinfonia; Melbourne Symphony Orchestra; National Arts Centre Orchestra; Residentie Orkest; Birmingham Royal Ballet; Emerson String Quartet, soprano Renée Fleming, and percussionist Colin Currie, among others, in venues including Carnegie Hall, Lincoln Center, Kennedy Center, the Elbphilharmonie, the Sydney Opera House, and Wigmore Hall.

Snider was Composer-in-Residence at CU Boulder in 2018–19 and has also held residencies at the University of Michigan and Vanderbilt University. She has also been Composer-in-Residence at Winnipeg New Music Festival, Soundstreams, the Bowling Green State University New Music Festival, the Great Lakes Chamber Music Festival, Nief-Norf Festival, Decoda Ensemble's Skidmore Chamber Music Institute, and the So Percussion Summer Institute. In fall 2023 she was a visiting lecturer at Princeton University, co-teaching a course on her operatic work through the Lewis Center for the Arts.

In 2014, Snider received the Elaine Lebenbom Award from the Detroit Symphony Orchestra, the only orchestra-sponsored award granted annually to a living female composer of any age or nationality. In 2026, her debut opera Hildegard won the Music Critics Association of North America’s Award for Best New Opera.

== List of works ==
=== Opera ===
- Hildegard (2025)

=== Orchestra ===
- Disquiet (2005, rev. 2012)
- Until I Become Human (2006) for mezzo-soprano, solo viola, and orchestra
- Hiraeth (2015)
- Something for the Dark (2016)
- The Blue Hour (2017) for mezzo-soprano and string orchestra
- Embrace (2018)
- Forward Into Light (2020)
- Eye of Mnemosyne (2023)
- Drink the Wild Ayre (2024)

=== Chamber ensemble ===
- Just Once (1997) for soprano and piano
- Mad Song (1998) for tenor and piano
- The Heart of the Woman (1998) for soprano and piano
- The Ecotone (1999) for two pianos
- Ave (2002) for string quartet
- Stanzas in Meditation (2004) for two sopranos and harp
- In Two Worlds (2005) for flute, oboe, bass clarinet, French horn, offstage trumpet, trumpet, vibraphone, violin, and cello
- Thread and Fray (2006) for bass clarinet, viola, and marimba
- Chrysalis (2006) for soprano and two violas
- Shiner (2006) for trombone, harp, viola, and marimba
- Passenger Seat (2006) for high voice (soprano, mezzo, or countertenor) and piano
- How Graceful Some Things Are, Falling Apart (2006) for mezzo-soprano and piano
- Daughter of the Waves (2011) for flute, clarinet, French horn, trumpet, electric guitar, violin, viola, and cello
- Pale as Centuries (2011) for flute, clarinet, bass clarinet, electric guitar, piano, and double bass
- Taking Turns in My Skin (2011) flute/piccolo, clarinet/bass clarinet, French horn, trumpet, electric guitar, violin, viola, cello, and soprano (optional finger cymbals, guiro, vibraslap)
- Penelope (2012) for fl/alto fl/picc, cl/bass cl — French horn, tmpt — drums/perc (glock, egg shaker, BD, gro, tri, 2 crot., fing cymb) — e. gtr./acoustic gtr. — mezzo-soprano — violin, viola, cello — laptop
- You Are Free (2015) for flute, clarinet, marimba, piano, violin, and cello
- Chrysalis (arr. 2015) for soprano, violin and cello
- Unremembered (2013, arr. 2016) for chamber orchestra, three voices, and electronics
- Five Songs from Unremembered (arr. 2017) for oboe, English horns, percussion, acoustic/electric guitar, harp, piano, violin, cello — Wide-Ranged Soprano (E3 to B5) — laptop (electronics)
- Parallel Play (2019) for flute and piano
- If you bring forth what is within you: Suite from Blue Hour (2019) for flute, clarinet, bassoon, French horn, piano, two violins, viola, cello, and double bass
- Penelope (arr. 2019) for mezzo-soprano — one drums/perc (vibr., glock., egg shaker, BD, gro, tri, 2 crot.) — two violins, viola, cello, double bass — laptop
- O Virtus Sapientiae (2020) for soprano, and string quartet
- Caritas (2021) for soprano, harp, and string quartet
- Eighteen Million Six (2021) for soprano, tenor, and piano
- Drink the Wild Ayre (2023)
- O Sweet and Beloved Mother (2023)
- Everything That Ever Was (2023)

=== Choir ===
- Here (2011) for SSAA chorus
- Psalm of the Soil (2013) for five tenors, two baritones, and two basses (optional piano accompaniment)
- Ouroboros (2015) for SSA chorus, string quartet, and two percussion
- Mass for the Endangered (2018) for SATB chorus, piano, string quintet, flute, oboe, clarinet, bassoon, harp and percussion
- You Must Feel with Certainty (2018) for SATB chorus and percussion

=== Solo instrument ===
- Finisterre (1997) for solo piano
- Only Five (1997) for solo piano
- Uninvited Reason (1998) for solo piano
- Prelude (1999) for solo piano
- A Single Breath (1999) for solo viola
- Ballade (2001) for solo piano
- The Reserved, The Reticent (2004) for solo cello
- The Currents (2012) for solo piano
- the plum tree I planted still there (2021) for solo piano

=== Musical theater ===
- The Burning Out of ’82 (1997) for SATB quartet, piano, and cello
