= Don't Be So Serious =

2017 song by Low Roar

Song by Low Roar

from the album Once in a Long, Long While...
- Released: April 14, 2017
- Genre: Post-rock, electronica, dream pop
- Length: 6:13
- Label: Tonequake Records
- Songwriter: Ryan Karazija
- Producers: Andrew Scheps, Mike Lindsay

"Don't Be So Serious" is a song by Icelandic band Low Roar as the opening track from their third studio album Once in a Long, Long While... (2017). The song was written by Ryan Karazija and produced by Andrew Scheps and Mike Lindsay.

The song grew in popularity after it was featured as the opening song for the 2019 Hideo Kojima game Death Stranding.

== Composition ==
The song was written after lead vocalist Ryan Karazija was cheated on. The lyrics reflect his anxiety and feelings akin to a panic attack, while the title is Karazija saying to not "take [him]self so seriously." At the end of the song, he sings the name of the woman who cheated on him. During a performance by Karazija in Milan, regarding the ending of the song, he explained how "nobody gave a shit when that song came out, so I thought I was in the clear" until Hideo Kojima used it as Death Stranding's intro, prompting him to later omit the ending during performances.

David Silbert of Epic Games describes the song as "a somber track, yet one with profound beauty [...] it gives reason to believe in tomorrow."

== Critical reception ==
After its inclusion in Death Stranding, many praised the track for setting the tone of the game. Dean Takahashi of VentureBeat said the track "creates a moody beginning for the story" and also interpreted it as Hideo Kojima's own joke regarding the "hype around Death Stranding." Brodie Gibbons from Press Start said the song "creates the perfect ambient cornerstone to introduce the game’s world" and labelled the game's soundtrack "nothing short of incredible," which heavily features Low Roar's discography.

While critiquing the game's pretentiousness, Ed Nightingale from PinkNews said the song incapsulates a message the game should've followed more closely.
