= Low Roar (album) =

Studio album by Low Roar
- Released: November 1, 2011
- Genre: Post-rock; ambient; folk rock
- Length: 53:37
- Label: Tonequake Records
- Producer: Ryan Karazija

Low Roar chronology
Low Roar (2011)	0 (2014)

Professional ratings
Review scores
Source	Rating
PopMatters	6/10

Low Roar is the debut album by the American-Icelandic musical project Low Roar, released on November 1, 2011, through Tonequake Records. "Help Me," the album's eighth track, was featured in the animated documentary film Flee. The song "Patience", along with many other songs from this album, was featured in the videogame Death Stranding.

== Music and style ==
Low Roar can be described as a post-rock, ambient and folk-rock album. The album is based on musician Ryan Karazija's move to Iceland, who was formerly of the indie rock band Audrye Sessions, as well as the change and introversion of fall.

== Recording and production ==
After moving from Livermore, California to Reykjavík, lead singer Ryan Karazija, formerly of the American indie rock band Audrye Sessions, chronicled the difficulty of acclimating to a foreign land, finding work, and supporting his family by writing a song each day.

The album was recorded with nothing more than a laptop in Ryan's kitchen in Reykjavík, as a result of having a very low budget after moving to Iceland.

== Track listing ==
Low Roar
No.	Title	Length
1.	"Give Up"	3:06
2.	"Just a Habit"	3:27
3.	"Nobody Else"	4:57
4.	"Patience"	5:45
5.	"Low Roar"	2:13
6.	"Friends Make Garbage, Good Friends Take It Out"	5:34
7.	"The Painter"	4:45
8.	"Help Me"	3:51
9.	"Rolling Over"	5:07
10.	"Puzzle"	3:18
11.	"Because We Have To"	3:55
12.	"Tonight, Tonight, Tonight"	7:56
Total length:		53:37

2023 vinyl exclusive bonus track
No.	Title	Length
13.	"No Words"	7:05
Total length:		60:42

== Personnel ==
Low Roar

- Ryan Karazija – all instruments and voices (except as noted), producer, recording, mixing
- Andrew Scheps – shimmer and sub on "Nobody Else", glock and brass on "The Painter", harmonium, piano, bass, and Doepfer on "Help Me", Doepfer on "Puzzle", rhodes on "Because We Have To", keys and programming on "Tonight, Tonight, Tonight", producer, recording, mixing

Additional personnel

- Burton Li – piano, pump organ and background vocals on "Give Up", piano, pump organ and guitar on "Rolling Over"
- Anton Patzner – strings on "Patience"
- Lewis Patzner – strings on "Patience", cello on "Help Me"
- Michael Knox – rhodes on "Just A Habit"
- Thorleifur Gaukur Davidsson – harmonica on "Friends Make Garbage, Good Friends Take It Out"
- Árni Teitur Ásgeirsson – programming on "Puzzle" and "Tonight, Tonight, Tonight"
- Rakka – cover art
