= Audrye Sessions (EP) =

EP by Audrye Sessions
- Released: October 14, 2008
- Recorded: 2008
- Studio: The Sound Factory
- Genre: Pop, rock
- Length: 17:28
- Label: Black Seal/Sony BMG
- Producer: Andrew Scheps

Audrye Sessions chronology
Braille (2007)	Audrye Sessions (2008)	Audrye Sessions (2009)

Audrye Sessions is the 2008 self-titled EP by the band Audrye Sessions, which was released on October 14, 2008, under Black Seal, a unit of Sony BMG. It featured their first single "Turn Me Off", which fared well among critics and received airplay on the radio.

== Background ==
Prior to Audrye Sessions, the band was signed with an independent label and released the album Braille. This led to a major-label recording contract with RCA Records' subsidiary Black Seal for Audrye Sessions. According to lead singer Karazija, inspiration for "Turn Me Off" came after watching a television special hosted by James Gandolfini about war veterans who came back injured badly. He says that the song is intended to evoke "being so messed up that you want to shut off." The song has been described as having an "up-tempo beat". "Awake" and "Where you'll find me" have been compared musically to Radiohead.

Although they did not do so extensively, Audrye Sessions supported the release of the EP with a tour, and performed at the CMJ Music Marathon in 2008. All four of the songs on the EP appeared on their self-titled full-length album. In 2008, Black Seal released the music video for "Turn Me Off", directed by Sean Desmond.

== Reception ==
Professional ratings
Review scores
Source	Rating
Aversion	2/5 stars
ALTsounds	(73%)
The Review Busters	(6/10)
Wonka Vision	3/5 stars

Audrye Sessions received mixed reviews among critics. Reviews from Aversion were not favorable, saying the EP was "marginally boring and certainly (an) unsavory sector of modern-day indie rock", and that the band provided better music live than recorded. However, it has been called an instant pleasure, and overall "more good than bad".

== Track listing ==
No.	Title	Length
1.	"Turn Me Off"	3:32
2.	"Awake"	3:23
3.	"Where You'll Find Me"	3:39
4.	"New Year's Day"	4:53
Total length:		17:28

Information of track listing.

== Personnel ==
- Alicia Marie Campbell – bass
- Ryan Karazija – vocals/guitar
- Michael Knox – guitar
- James Leste – drums
- Andrew Scheps - production/mixing

== Sources ==
- Billboard magazine. 121 (7). Nielsen Business Media, Inc: 52. February 21, 2009. ISSN 0006-2510.
- CMJ New Music Monthly (155). CMJ Network, Inc: 48. June 2008. ISSN 1074-6978.
