= House in the Woods (album) =

- Cover art hand-painted by Chatham Forbes Jr.

Studio album by Low Roar
- Released: February 7, 2025
- Recorded: 2022–2024
- Length: 52:04
- Language: English
- Label: Tonequake Records
- Producers: Ryan Karazija; Andrew Scheps; Mike Lindsay

Low Roar chronology
maybe tomorrow... (2021)	House in the Woods (2025)

Singles from House in the Woods
- 1. "Field of Dreams" Released: December 6, 2024; 2. "Just How It Goes" Released: January 3, 2025

House in the Woods is the sixth and final studio album by Low Roar, released on February 7, 2025 through Tonequake Records. It features vocals from Karazija, who died in October of 2022 but had recorded all of his parts for the album prior to his death. The songs "Field of Dreams" and "Just How It Goes" were released as singles.

== Background ==
On September 20, 2022, lead vocalist Karazija posted on social media announcing the band's discography was going to be released on limited edition vinyl, along with mentioning a "new album called 'house in the woods'" in the same post.

After Karazija's death, it was also announced that a sixth album would be eventually released.

Over the course of 2023, producer Andrew Scheps would give updates on the band's social media about physical media releases and, at the end of the year, would give more updates regarding the production of the final album with periodic updates being posted throughout 2024. On October 27, 2024, Scheps announced that the album was completed and would be released on February 7, 2025. The announcement also revealed the release date for two singles off the album; the lead single "Field of Dreams" on December 6, and a second single on January 3, later revealed to be the song "Just How It Goes."

== Track listing ==
No.	Title	Length
1.	"Some Day Come Back to Me"	3:33
2.	"Field of Dreams"	4:21
3.	"Just How It Goes"	5:13
4.	"None of your Business"	5:37
5.	"Mom"	5:22
6.	"Estella"	2:20
7.	"Double Trouble"	7:04
8.	"Two Worlds Apart"	6:48
9.	"Gone Fishing"	5:10
10.	"InterStella"	1:29
11.	"House in the Woods"	5:01
Total length:		52:04

== Personnel ==
Low Roar

- Ryan Karazija – vocals, producer, recording
- Mike Lindsay – synth, producer, recording
- Andrew Scheps – harmonium, bass, modular synth, choir, trumpet, flugelhorn, producer, recording, mixing

Additional personnel

- Jarle Storløkken – string arrangement on "None of Your Business"
- Shara Nova – string arrangement on "Estella"
- Ross Blake – saxophone, percussion
- Emma Lindström – background vocals
- Richard Lindström – additional musician, additional recording
- Helge Sten – mastering
- Chatham Forbes Jr. – artwork
