= Icelandic people of American descent =

Americans in Iceland
Total population
- 4.000-5.000

Regions with significant populations
- Reykjavík, Southern Peninsula

Languages
- English language · Icelandic language

Religion
- Christian, Jewish

Icelandic people of American descent make up around 1% of Iceland's population. The first Americans known to have settled in a large group came during World War II, in the form of servicemen.

== Notable individuals with American roots ==
- Aldís Amah Hamilton Actress
- Kristófer Acox Basketball Player
- Frank Aron Booker Basketball Player
- Alex Somers Artist
- Árni Johnsen Politician, His father was an American soldier.
- Björgólfur Hideaki Takefusa 1/4 American
- Þór Saari Politician, His father was Finnish-American
- Gunnar Nelson (Fighter), 1/4 American
- Sarah Blake Bateman
- Bobby Fischer chess player
- Danero Thomas Basketball Player
- Ryan Karazija Musician
- Patrik Atlason Musician and former football player 1/8 American, his grandmother Jóna Steinunn Patricia Conway was daughter of American soldier
- Sæþór Benjamín Randalsson Politician

== Sources ==
- http://hagstofa.is
- http://www.mbl.is/mm/gagnasafn/grein.html?grein_id=1100890
- http://www.mbl.is/mm/gagnasafn/grein.html?grein_id=100063
