= Earl Harvin =

American drummer

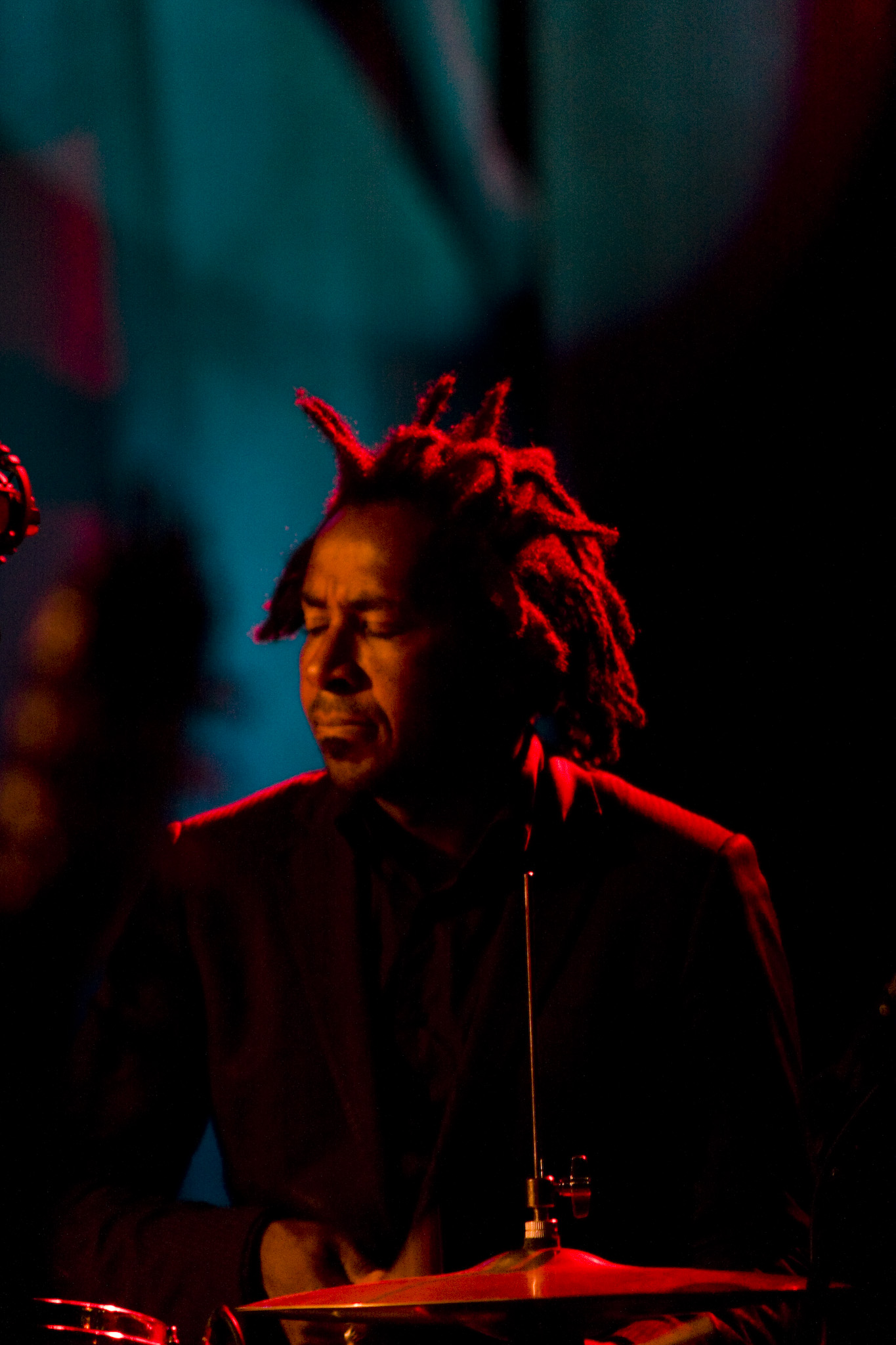
- Harvin in 2009

Background information
- Born: New York City, United States
- Origin: Berlin, Germany
- Genres: Alternative rock, pop, electronica
- Instrument(s): Drums, percussion, drum programming, guitar, bass
- Website: Official site

Earl Harvin is an American drummer, percussionist and multi-instrumentalist who has lived in Dallas, Texas and Los Angeles and is now residing in Berlin, Germany.

Harvin studied at the University of North Texas College of Music where he was a member of the One O'Clock Lab Band for one year, beginning 1989. Throughout most of the 1990s, he led the jazz band Earl Harvin Trio (including Fred Hamilton and Dave Palmer) and led the rock band rubberbullet. Earl Harvin Trio won the Dallas Observer category of "Jazz" in 2003. Harvin also performed or recorded with various Texas-based artists including James Clay, Chao, Ten Hands and Billy Goat. He has since performed or recorded with MC 900 Foot Jesus, Seal, Joe Henry, The The, The Psychedelic Furs, Trevor Horn, Pet Shop Boys, Art of Noise, The Frames, Richard Thompson, Jeff Beck, Damien Rice, Glen Hansard, Hikaru Utada, and many others. Harvin's contribution to Seal's Human Being includes drums, bass and guitar as well as co-writing on "Latest Craze". Harvin has toured extensively with the French duo Air. Recently he has performed and recorded with Berlin- and London-based Warren Suicide. As of 2010 he has recorded and toured as a member of the English band Tindersticks. Ari Hoenig has cited him as a major influence.

In 2009, Harvin released a CD solo project, Oracles, on which he played all instruments and provided vocals.

== Discography ==
- Oracles (2009; independent)

=== Earl Harvin Trio ===
- Trio/Quartet (1996; Leaning House)
- Strange Happy [as Earl Harvin/Dave Palmer] (1997; Leaning House)
- At The Gypsy Tea Room (1999; Leaning House)
- Unincorporated (2001; Two Ohm Hop)
- The Jam (DVD - 2005; Mel Bay)

=== Rubberbullet ===
- Grinning Bitches/Entangled 7" (1994; Last Beat Records)
- rubberbullet (1995; Last Beat Records)
- Open (1996; Last Beat Record])
- The Kissing Song/King Of The Damned Lazer Gag 7" [split w/ Baboon] (1997; Last Beat Records)

=== With others ===
- Ten Hands, Kung Fu... That's What I Like (1988)
- Ten Hands, The Big One Is Coming (live) (1989)
- Billy Goat, Bush Roaming Mammals (1992)
- Seal, Human Being (1998), "IV" (2003)
- The The, Naked Self (2000) / Ensoulment (2024)
- Black Frames, Solarallergy (2002)
- The Richard Thompson Band Live Ducknapped! (2003)
- Malachy Papers, with Earl Harvin (2005)
- My Brightest Diamond, Bring Me the Workhorse (2006)
- Warren Suicide, Requiem for a Missing Link (2008)
- My Brightest Diamond, A Thousand Shark's Teeth (2008)
- Robbie Williams, Reality Killed the Video Star (2009)
- Jeff Beck, Emotion & Commotion (2010)
- Tindersticks, Falling Down a Mountain (2010)
- My Brightest Diamond, This Is My Hand (2014)
- My Brightest Diamond, A Million and One (2018)
- Scrote & Earl Harvin, scr011 (2020)
