= Atli Einarsson =

Icelandic footballer

Personal information
- Full name: Atli Stefán Einarsson
- Date of birth: 20 October 1966 (age 60)
- Place of birth: Iceland
- Position: Midfielder

Senior career*
Years	Team	Apps	(Gls)
1982–1984	ÍBÍ	9	(0)
1985–1992	Víkingur Reykjavík	137	(34)
1989–1990	→ TuRU Düsseldorf (loan)	?	(?)
1993	Fram	12	(5)
1994	FH	16	(3)
1995	Fram	15	(0)
1996–1997	Víkingur Reykjavík	15	(4)

International career
1983	Iceland U19	3	(1)
1985	Iceland U21	2	(0)
1990–1992	Iceland	4	(0)
- * Club domestic league appearances and goals

Atli Stefán Einarsson (born 20 October 1966) is an Icelandic former footballer who played as an attacking midfielder. He won four caps for the Iceland national football team between 1990 and 1992. He won the Icelandic championship in 1991 as a member of Víkingur Reykjavík.

== Personal life ==
Atli's father, Einar Valur Kristjánsson, was an alpine skier who competed in two events at the 1956 Winter Olympics. He also played football for ÍBÍ and Víkingur Reykjavík.

Atli's son is musician and former footballer Patrik Atlason.

== Honours ==
- Icelandic Championships: 1

1991,

== See also ==
- List of Iceland international footballers
