= Something for the Dark =

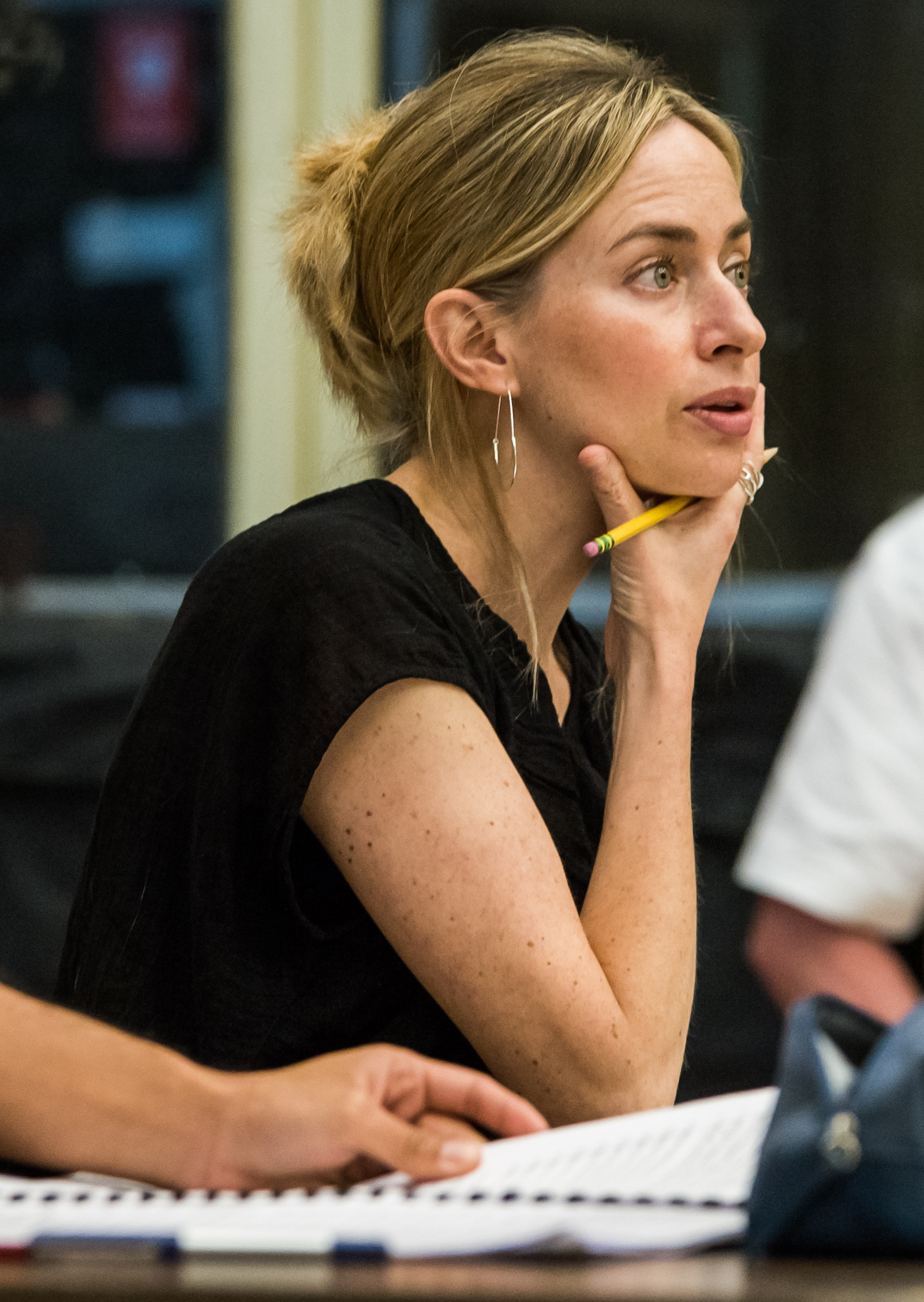
Sarah Kirkland Snider in 2018

Something for the Dark is an orchestral composition written in 2016 by the American composer Sarah Kirkland Snider. The work was commissioned by the Detroit Symphony Orchestra as a result of Snider receiving the 2014 Elaine Lebenbom Award for Female Composers. Its world premiere was given by the Detroit Symphony Orchestra conducted by Giancarlo Guerrero on April 14, 2016.

== Composition ==
Something for the Dark lasts about 12 minutes and is cast in a single movement. The title of the piece comes from the closing line of the 1961 poem "For Fran," written by the Detroit-born former United States Poet Laureate Philip Levine.

=== Instrumentation ===
The work is scored for a large orchestra consisting of piccolo, two flutes, two oboes, Cor anglais, three clarinets, two bassoons, contrabassoon, four horns, four trumpets, two trombones, bass trombone, tuba, timpani, three percussionists, piano (doubling celesta), harp, and strings.

== Reception ==
Corinna da Fonseca-Wollheim of The New York Times described it as a "sophisticated piece," writing, "repetition transforms the emotional charge of musical motifs. A turn of phrase may appear pretty at first, then take on shades of nostalgia before registering as a creepy obsession haunting the ear. Ms. Snider skillfully draws a wide arc, with throbbing brass accents and slashing chords driving up tension. The work ends quietly, as if on a question." Colin Roshak of Cleveland Classical similarly described the piece as a "colorful [...] sort of concerto for orchestra." He added, "Each section enjoyed its moment to shine as the piece cycled through a series of themes and rhythmic variations. It begins with an ethereal high note played by a single violin, and expands into a Mahlerian world of sound and textures."
