= Maybe Tomorrow... =

2021 album by Low Roar

maybe tomorrow...
- Cover art by Emma Lindström ('Maiilaho V')

Studio album by Low Roar
- Released: July 30, 2021
- Studio: High Studio (Margate, Kent); Punkerpad UK (Monnow Valley Studio) (also mixing); Studio Elenette (Gothenburg, Sweden); Audio Virus Lab (Oslo, Norway) (mastering)
- Genre: Post-rock; Indie rock; Indie pop
- Length: 63:12
- Label: Tonequake Records
- Producer: Ryan Karazija; Mike Lindsay; Andrew Scheps

Low Roar chronology
ross. (2019)	maybe tomorrow... (2021)	House In The Woods (2025)

Singles from maybe tomorrow...
- 1. "Everything To Lose" Released: June 4, 2021; 2. "Hummingbird" Released: July 2, 2021

Maybe Tomorrow... (stylized in all lowercase) is the fifth studio album by the musical project Low Roar, released July 30, 2021 through Tonequake Records. A reviewer from Sputnikmusic stated the band "fashioned their own cyclical universe" through the album's storytelling and described the music as "so pure, moving, and intricate that you can't afford to continue ignoring it."

The songs "Everything To Lose" and "Hummingbird" were released as singles. The album's fifth track was featured in the mobile game Arknights under the title "Feels."

It was the last album released by the band before the death of lead vocalist and founder Ryan Karazija in October of the following year due to complications with pneumonia.

== Track listing ==
No.	Title	Length
1.	"David"	5:36
2.	"Sleep Peacefully"	2:48
3.	"Fucked Up"	8:59
4.	"Hummingbird"	5:52
5.	"Fade Away (Note: Subtitled on the vinyl as: i Feels; ii Warm; iii People)"	5:51
6.	"Burial Ground"	2:22
7.	"Stay Calm, Keep Quiet"	4:06
8.	"Everything To Lose"	5:48
9.	"Captain"	5:39
10.	"Bye Bye"	7:27
11.	"Clareland"	3:08
12.	"Everything To Lose - Single Edit"	5:36
Total length:		63:12

== Personnel ==
Low Roar

- Ryan Karazija – all noises, producer, recording
- Mike Lindsay – all noises, producer, recording
- Andrew Scheps – all noises, producer, recording, mixing

Additional personnel

- Emma Lindström – background vocals, artwork
- Richard Lindström – additional synthesizer, sound engineer, additional recording
- Helge Sten – mastering
- Margaret Luther – vinyl cut
