= Bring Me the Workhorse =

Studio album by My Brightest Diamond
- Released: 22 August 2006
- Genre: Indie rock Folk
- Length: 45:56
- Label: Asthmatic Kitty

My Brightest Diamond chronology
| Bring Me the Workhorse (2006) | Tear It Down (2007) |

Bring Me the Workhorse is the debut studio album from the American rock group My Brightest Diamond.

== Content ==
The eleven-track album was released on vinyl, compact disc and digital download with Asthmatic Kitty Records, on 22 August 2006. It is produced and engineered by Worden, with additional engineering from Joel Shearer, mixed by Andrew Scheps, and mastered by Alan Douches. The album draws comparison to the music of PJ Harvey, Portishead's Beth Gibbons, and Björk. The song "The Robin's Jar" explores loss and childhood trauma, about a dead bird placed in a jar for it to be reborn, and as an analogy to the death of a loved one in adulthood.

== Reception ==
Professional ratings
Review scores
| Source | Rating |
|---|---|
| Allmusic | 3.5/5 stars |
| Consequence of Sound | (8/10) |
| Pitchfork | (8.1/10) |
| PopMatters | 6/10 stars |
| Slant | 3.5/5 stars |

A positive review from Pitchfork says that Worden "takes herself seriously, and such unapologetically dramatic material will make her a tough sell to indie fans who still hold irony and emotional detachment dear. It is, though, impossible to miss her confidence as a performer and it allows her to tread territory that would make others look clumsy, to string together multiple moments of beauty." On the album's lyrics and melodies, PopMatters notes the "wonderfully direct, true-in-the-best sense lines, apart from fitting the torch ballad mood like a blood-red evening dress, unmistakably illustrate My Brightest Diamond's method: the intersection of skillful direction and passionate conveyance." Consequence of Sound says that Worden "wastes no time in getting to the spooked heart of her subject matter, and Workhorse is an album littered with portentous phone calls, flies caught in webs and workhorses ready for the glue factory."

For the songs "Dragonfly," "Something of an End" and "We Were Sparkling," Slant writes "the operatic storytelling and codas of songs [which] finds Worden's trills emulating the sound of a ringing phone, reflect [her] classical training [and] the album's strings are sexy and cinematic, the guitars ominous, and Worden's vocals quiver quickly [over] the angelic choir which bleeds into the nostalgic sounds of a tinkling music box."

== Track listing ==
All tracks are written by Shara Worden.

| No. | Title | Length |
|---|---|---|
| 1. | "Something of an End" | 4:51 |
| 2. | "Golden Star" | 2:55 |
| 3. | "Gone Away" | 4:42 |
| 4. | "Dragonfly" | 5:24 |
| 5. | "Freak Out" | 3:33 |
| 6. | "We Were Sparkling" | 2:43 |
| 7. | "Disappear" | 4:04 |
| 8. | "The Robin's Jar" | 3:20 |
| 9. | "Magic Rabbit" | 5:25 |
| 10. | "The Good & the Bad Guy" | 4:16 |
| 11. | "Workhorse" | 4:43 |

== Personnel ==
- Chris Bruce – bass
- Earl Harvin – drums
- Marla Hansen – viola
- Maria Jeffers – cello
- Rob Moose – violin
- Zac Rae – keyboards on "Something of an End" and "Workhorse"
- David Stith – prepared piano "Freak Out," backing vocals on "Disappear" and "Magic Rabbit," layout design and drawing
- Shara Worden – lead & backing vocals, guitars, electric piano, celesta, organ, vibraphone, musical box, percussion, string arrangements, producer, engineer and artistic director
- Barry Wright – trumpet on "The Good & the Bad Guy"
- Keith Wright – accordion on "Gone Away"

=== Additional personnel ===
- Alan Douches – mastering
- Mikael Hines – assistant photographer
- Katrina Kerns – make-up and hair stylist
- Kevin McMahon – string engineer
- Heather Morris – hair stylist
- Joel Shearer – engineer
- Andrew Scheps – mixing
- Sarah Small – photography
