= Tear It Down =

Remix album by My Brightest Diamond
- Released: 6 March 2007
- Genres: Indie rock, electronic folk
- Length: 67:59
- Label: Asthmatic Kitty

My Brightest Diamond chronology
Bring Me the Workhorse (2006)	Tear It Down (2007)	A Thousand Shark's Teeth (2008)

Tear It Down is the first remix album from the American rock group My Brightest Diamond.

== Content ==
The thirteen-track album was released on compact disc and digital download with Asthmatic Kitty, on 6 March 2007. Tear It Down features remixed versions of songs from My Brightest Diamond's previous album, Bring Me the Workhorse. The remixes were made by obscure collaborators of Worden, and by MySpace friends. In an interview with Brightest Young Things, Worden says "I had produced Bring Me the Workhorse myself, and felt interested in hearing how some electronically minded folks would deal with the songs, how that would affect the feelings in the lyrics, and how taking the songs out of a rock context would alter the impression of the material." The title, Tear It Down comes from a line in the song "Freak Out."

== Reception ==
Professional ratings
Review scores
Source	Rating
AllMusic	3.5/5 stars
PopMatters	6/10 stars

A review from AllMusic says the Tear It Down "turns over Bring Me the Workhorse's tracks to sonic manipulators, most of whom go with a subtle, stripped-down approach that focuses on Worden's glorious voice and string arrangements, augmented by a few abstract beats," and closes with noting "like most remix albums, Tear It Down is a little uneven, but it's more solidly entertaining than many similar projects -- and at the very least, it offers My Brightest Diamond fans a fresh way to enjoy Worden's work." A mixed review by PopMatters notes that the album "doesn't totally fail as a cohesive unit is a testament, primarily, to Shara Worden's distinctive voice; but it's also a measure of the invasiveness (or lack thereof) of the remixes themselves."

== Track listing ==
No.	Title	Remixed by	Length
1.	"Golden Star"	Alias	3:20
2.	"Workhorse"	Lusine	4:35
3.	"Freak Out (Panique mix)"	Gold Chains	5:47
4.	"Disappear"	Stakka	4:05
5.	"Dragonfly"	Murcof	5:56
6.	"Magic Rabbit"	Alfred Brown	5:24
7.	"Freak Out (REWIND 93 REMIX)"	DJ Kenny Mitchell feat. Nimnomadic	7:11
8.	"We Were Sparkling"	Haruki	3:09
9.	"Something of an End"	David Keith	6:04
10.	"Gone Away"	David Michael Stith	5:46
11.	"The Good and the Bad Guy"	Siamese Sisters	6:42
12.	"Gone Away"	Strings of Consciousness	3:42
13.	"Disappear (Wheat to Whiskey mix)"	Cedar AV	6:16
Total length:			67:59
