= Ross. (Low Roar album) =

ross.

Studio album by Low Roar
- Released: November 8, 2019
- Studio: High Studio (Margate, Kent); Punkerpad UK (Monnow Valley Studio) (mixing)
- Genre: Post-rock; electronica; dream pop
- Length: 41:33
- Label: Paper Records
- Producer: Ryan Karazija; Mike Lindsay; Andrew Scheps

Low Roar chronology
Once in a Long, Long While... (2017)	ross. (2019)	maybe tomorrow... (2021)

Singles from ross.
- 1. "Slow Down" Released: September 27, 2019; 2. "Darkest Hour" Released: October 18, 2019

ross. is the fourth studio album by the musical project Low Roar, released on November 8, 2019, through Paper Records. The songs "Slow Down" and "Darkest Hour" were released as singles.

== Track listing ==
No.	Title	Length
1.	"Darkest Hour"	3:00
2.	"Slow Down"	3:45
3.	"H.A.F.H."	4:15
4.	"I'll Make You Feel"	5:46
5.	"Not Around"	5:06
6.	"222"	3:53
7.	"Feel Like Dying"	3:06
8.	"The Machine"	5:35
9.	"Blue Eyes"	2:03
10.	"Empty House"	5:04
Total length:		41:33

== Personnel ==
Low Roar

- Ryan Karazija – all instruments, producer, recording
- Mike Lindsay – all instruments, producer, recording
- Andrew Scheps – all instruments, producer, recording, mixing

Additional personnel

- Ross Blake – additional saxophone and clarinet
- Graham Godfrey – additional percussion
