= Andrew Scheps =

- Genres: Pop, rock, classical
- Occupations: Mix Engineer, Recording Engineer, Audio engineer, producer
- Years active: 1991–present

Andrew Scheps (born November 10, 1969) is an American mix engineer, recording engineer, record producer, and record label owner based in Los Angeles and the United Kingdom. He has received Grammy Awards for Best Rock Album for his work on Red Hot Chili Peppers' Stadium Arcadium, Album of the Year for Adele's 21, and Best Reggae Album for Ziggy Marley's Fly Rasta.

== Biography ==
A Long Island native who got his start playing jazz trumpet, Andrew Scheps has mixed records for artists such as the Red Hot Chili Peppers, Adele, Metallica, Jay-Z and many others. After graduating from the Recording Engineering Program at the University of Miami, he spent some time working for New England Digital as a field service technician for the Synclavier, one of the first digital synthesizers / samplers / workstations. He later worked on the road with Stevie Wonder (as a keyboard tech) and Michael Jackson (mixing live sound), before settling in LA.

Having got into mixing a few years before the analog-to-digital revolution, Andrew worked with a collection of vintage gear at his Punkerpad West studio in Van Nuys, California, including a Neve Electronics BCM-10 with ten 1073s that were used for reference during the Waves Audio Scheps 73 plugin modeling process.

Scheps is known for his balanced, modern sounding and often loud mixes. In July 2015, while being interviewed on Pensado's Place, he declared to work completely "ITB" (in the box), meaning entirely inside a computer without external gear. His full transition to ITB mixing occurred halfway through mixing the Hozier record in the summer of 2014. Scheps has said the change was driven primarily by logistics rather than sound — console recalls were unreliable and increasingly at odds with clients' expectations of near-instant turnaround — and that he would not have adopted the workflow if he believed it compromised the sound.

He is also the owner and president of Tonequake Records and Punkerpad UK (formerly Punker Pad West).

== Awards ==
In 2012, he won the award for "International Engineer of the Year" from the Music Producers Guild. He was nominated for the same award again in 2025.

He received the 2011 TEC Award (Technical Excellence & Creativity) for "Outstanding Creative Achievement - Record Production Album."

=== Honorary Doctorates ===
In 2019, Buckinghamshire New University recognized Andrew as a leading figure in the recording industry with an Honorary Doctorate. Then in 2022, the University of Huddersfield awarded Andrew with an honorary doctorate for services to international music engineering.

=== Grammy Awards ===
Andrew received a Grammy award for Best Reggae Album in 2015 for mixing the Ziggy Marley album Fly Rasta.

In 2012, he won a Grammy Award for Album of the Year for Adele 21.

And in 2006, he won a Grammy Award for "Best Rock Album," for his recording and mixing contributions on the Red Hot Chili Peppers album Stadium Arcadium. The band also won 3 additional Grammy awards including one for Best Rock Song and Best Rock Performance.

== Music education ==
Scheps has been teaching week-long seminars in the south of France at studios La Fabrique where he shares his knowledge about his mixing, engineering and recording techniques as part of the "Mix With The Masters" program.

== Discography ==
Mastodon	"Your Ghost Again"	2026
Robert Plant	Saving Grace	2025
Suede	Antidepressants	2025
Kaleo	Mixed Emotions	2025
Fitz and The Tantrums	Man on the Moon	2025
Bartees Strange	Horror	2025
Low Roar	House In The Woods	2025
The Smashing Pumpkins	Aghori Mhori Mei	2024
Whiskey Myers	Tornillo	2022
Low Roar	maybe tomorrow...	2021
Kaleo	Surface Sounds	2020
Apocalyptica	Cell-0	2020
Low Roar	ross.	2019
Rival Sons	Feral Roots	2019
Hozier	Wasteland, Baby!	2019
My Brightest Diamond	A Million and One	2018
First Aid Kit	Tender Offerings	2018
Joyce Manor	Million Dollars to Kill Me	2018
Daughtry	Cage to Rattle	2018
Welles	"Seventeen"	2018
First Aid Kit	Ruins	2018
Low Roar	Once in a Long, Long While...	2017
Rancid	Trouble Maker	2017
Chase Rice	Lambs & Lions	2017
You Me at Six	Night People	2017
CRX	New Skin	2016
Kaleo	A/B	2016
Green Day	Revolution Radio	2016
The Heavy	Hurt & The Merciless	2016
Zac Brown Band	Jekyll + Hyde	2015
Amos Lee	Live at Red Rocks with the Colorado Symphony	2015
Farao	Till It's All Forgotten	2015
Plastiscines	Back to the Start	2014
Jennifer Nettles	That Girl	2014
Low Roar	0	2014
Hozier	Hozier	2014
Cinerama	Seven Wonders of the World	2014
Rodrigo Y Gabriela	9 Dead Alive	2014
Ziggy Marley	Fly Rasta	2014
Red Hot Chili Peppers	I'm Beside You / I'm with You Sessions	2013
Jake Bugg	Shangri La	2013
AFI	Burials	2013
Gogol Bordello	Pura Vida Conspiracy	2013
Lady Gaga	Artpop	2013
Black Sabbath	13	2013
Bon Jovi	What About Now	2013
Chic Gamine	Closer	2013
Beyoncé	"Angel"	2013
Beyoncé	"XO"	2013
Special Request	Soul Music	2013
The Wedding Present	'4 Songs' EP	2012
Lana Del Rey	Paradise	2012
Our Lady Peace	Curve	2012
Lana Del Rey	Born to Die	2012
The Hives	Lex Hives	2012
Richie Sambora	Aftermath of the Lowdown	2012
The Wedding Present	Valentina	2012
Gogol Bordello	Моя Цыганиада	2011
Low Roar	Low Roar	2011
The Duke Spirit	Bruiser	2011
Adele	21	2011
Red Hot Chili Peppers	I'm with You	2011
Grace Potter and the Nocturnals	Grace Potter and the Nocturnals	2011
Wendy & Lisa	Snapshots	2011
fDeluxe	Gaslight	2011
The Duke Spirit	'Kusama' EP	2010
Kid Rock	"God Bless Saturday"	2010
Kid Rock	"Rock Bottom Blues"	2010
Gogol Bordello	Trans-Continental Hustle	2010
Josh Groban	"War at Home"	2010
Gossip	Music for Men	2009
AFI	Crash Love	2009
Pilot Speed	Wooden Bones	2009
Our Lady Peace	Burn Burn	2009
Audrye Sessions	Audrye Sessions	2009
Blood Red Shoes	Box of Secrets	2008
Linkin Park	Songs from the Underground	2008
Audrye Sessions	Audrye Sessions EP	2008
Cass McCombs	Dropping the Writ	2008
Weezer	Weezer (Red Album)	2008
Metallica	Death Magnetic	2008
Neil Diamond	Home Before Dark	2008
The (International) Noise Conspiracy	The Cross of My Calling	2007
The Duke Spirit	"You Really Wake Up the Love in Me"	2007
Nicole Atkins	Neptune City	2007
Manu Chao	La Radiolina	2007
Linkin Park	Minutes to Midnight	2007
Fightstar	"We Apologize for Nothing"	2007
Red Hot Chili Peppers	"Tell Me Baby"	2007
Neil Diamond	12 Songs	2005
Red Hot Chili Peppers	"Snow (Hey Oh)"	2006
U2	"Window in the Skies"	2006
Red Hot Chili Peppers	"Dani California"	2006
My Brightest Diamond	Bring Me the Workhorse	2006
Red Hot Chili Peppers	Stadium Arcadium	2006
Justin Timberlake	"(Another Song) All Over Again"	2006
Randy Coleman	Last Salutation	2005
The Picture	Connect	2005
The Mars Volta	Frances the Mute	2005
Rent	Selections of the Original Motion Picture Soundtrack	2005
Bette Midler	Sings the Peggy Lee Songbook	2005
The (International) Noise Conspiracy	Armed Love	2004
Lil Jon & The East Side Boyz	"Stop Fuckin Wit Me" from Crunk Juice	2004
Omar Rodríguez-López	A Manual Dexterity: Soundtrack Volume One	2004
The Ben Taylor Band	Famous Among the Barns	2003
The Mars Volta	"Inertiatic ESP"	2003
Endo	Songs for the Restless	2003
Red Hot Chili Peppers	"Universally Speaking"	2003
Alien Ant Farm	TruANT	2003
Cash	Unearthed	2003
Limp Bizkit	Results May Vary	2003
Audioslave	"Cochise"	2003
The Mars Volta	De-Loused In The Comatorium	2003
Audioslave	"Like a Stone"	2003
Jay-Z	"99 Problems"	2003
The Mars Volta	Televators	2003
Jewel	0304	2003
Limp Bizkit	Eat You Alive	2003
Limp Bizkit	"Behind Blue Eyes"	2003
Johnny Cash	American IV: The Man Comes Around	2002
Andrew W.K.	We Want Fun	2002
Red Hot Chili Peppers	"The Zephyr Song"	2002
Audioslave	Audioslave	2002
Red Hot Chili Peppers	"By the Way"	2002
Alanis Morissette	Under Rug Swept	2002
Sum 41	"It's What We're All About"	2002
Sheila Nicholls	Wake	2002
Alanis Morissette	Feast on Scraps	2002
Zeromancer	Clone Your Lover	2001
Iggy Pop	Shakin' All Over	1999
Põvi	Dragonflies	1999
Human Nature	Counting Down	1999
Põvi	Life in Volcanoes	1999
Pure Sugar	Hold on to My Love	1998
Taylor Dayne	Naked Without You	1998
Globe	Relation	1998
Robbie Robertson	Contact from the Underworld of Redboy	1998
David Holmes	Out of Sight	1998
Social Distortion	Live at the Roxy	1998
Michael Jackson	Ghost	1997
Quincy Jones	Q's Jook Joint	1995
Michael Jackson	HIStory - Past, Present and Future - Book I	1995
Kenny Loggins	Leap of Faith	1991
Diana Ross	The Force Behind the Power	1991
Jermaine Jackson	You Said	1991
