= Patrik Atlason =

Icelandic musician and footballer (born 1994)

- Born: Patrik Snær Atlason; November 2, 1994 (age 32)
- Other name: Prettyboitjokkó
- Occupation: Musician
Association football career
- Position: Forward
Youth career
- –2012: Víkingur Reykjavík
- 2013: FH
Senior career*
Years	Team	Apps	(Gls)
2011–2012	Víkingur Reykjavík	11	(2)
2015–2016	ÍR	16	(6)
2016	Njarðvík	7	(1)
2017	Grótta	0	(0)
2017-2018	Víðir Garður	23	(9)
2018	KFG	5	(1)
2019	KÁ	9	(4)
2020	ÍH	10	(3)
2021	ÍH	3	(0)
Total		84	(26)
- * Club domestic league appearances and goals as of 4 April 2024

Patrik Snær Atlason (born 2 November 1994), known by his stage name Prettyboitjokkó, is an Icelandic musician and former footballer.

== Music career ==
Patrik started his music career in 2021. In March 2024, his song Skína was selected as the Icelandic the song of the year in the pop, rock, hip-hop and electronic music category.

== Personal life ==
Patrik's father is former national team player Atli Einarsson and his sister is footballer Nadía Atladóttir. His paternal grandfather was alpine skier and Olympian Einar Valur Kristjánsson and his maternal grandfather is businessman Helgi Vilhjálmsson, better known as Helgi í Góu, owner of food distributor Góa and the KFC restaurant chain in Iceland.

fyrir rúmum 4 árum senti hann tipa mynd af ser a for inn a krakka og vildi sja tipia
