= Embrace (ballet) =

Ballet by Helen Grime

Embrace is a ballet written in 2018 by the American composer Sarah Kirkland Snider and choreographed by the British choreographer George Williamson. The work was commissioned by Birmingham Royal Ballet as the inauguration piece of their Ballet Now program. Its world premiere was given by the Birmingham Royal Ballet and Sinfonia at the Sadler's Wells Theatre, London, on June 15, 2018.

== Composition ==
Embrace has a duration of approximately 35 minutes. The narrative follows a male protagonist coming to terms with his homosexuality. In the score program note, Snider described the ballet as a "highly personal work [that] explores ideas of sexuality and individual identity, and examines what happens when these concepts come into conflict with societal expectations."

=== Instrumentation ===
The work is scored for an orchestra consisting of two flutes (2nd doubling piccolo), two oboes (2nd doubling Cor anglais), two clarinets (2nd doubling bass clarinet), two bassoons (2nd doubling contrabassoon), four horns, two trumpets, three trombones, timpani, two percussionists, piano (doubling celesta), harp, and strings.

== Reception ==
Zo Anderson of The Independent described Embrace as "the most interesting work I've seen from Williamson" and praised the collaboration between the dancers and music of Embrace. She added that "Snider's new score supports the action with atmospheric, lyrical music." Debra Craine of The Times similarly wrote, "Embrace is an earnest and heartfelt gay coming-out tale, with dramatic music (from Sarah Kirkland Snider, played live) and a clearly defined choreographic journey from confusion and confrontation to acceptance and reconciliation."

Judith Mackrell of The Guardian was more critical of the work, however. Despite describing the ballet as a "bravely personal work," he lamented the protagonist's choreography as "too crude a representation of a lost and tortured soul" and Snider's music as "hectic." He added, "It's only when the work calms down that we see its possibilities."
