= Arknights =

2019 video game

- App icon depicting Amiya.
- Developers: Hypergryph; Studio Montagne
- Publishers: CHN: Hypergryph; WW: Yostar; TW: Gryphline
- Engine: Unity
- Platforms: Android; iOS; Windows
- Release: Android, iOS: CHN: 1 May 2019; JP/KR: 15 January 2020; WW: 16 January 2020; TW: 29 June 2020; PC: WW: August 13, 2026
- Genres: Tactical role-playing, tower defense
- Mode: Single-player

Chinese name
- Traditional Chinese: 明日方舟
- Simplified Chinese: 明日方舟
- Literal meaning: Ark of Tomorrow
Transcriptions
Standard Mandarin
- Hanyu Pinyin: Míngrì Fāngzhōu

Arknights (Note: Chinese: 明日方舟; pinyin: Míngrì Fāngzhōu; lit. 'Ark of Tomorrow') is a free-to-play tactical RPG/tower defense mobile game with gacha game mechanics, developed and published by Chinese studio Hypergryph. It was released in China on 1 May 2019, in other countries on 16 January 2020, and in Taiwan on 29 June 2020. Arknights is available on Android, iOS platforms and Windows.

A spin-off game, Arknights: Endfield, was released in January 2026. Three seasons of an anime adaptation of Arknights have aired from late 2022 to 2025.

== Gameplay ==
One of the levels of Arknights. In this level, enemies proceed from right to left, and to stop them the player has deployed (from the top) a ranged operator, a melee operator and a healer on the left side of the screen. At the bottom, the remaining deployable operators are displayed.

The core gameplay is that of a tower defense game, with a number of characters ("operators") acting as towers. Operators have distinct personalities and possess unique combat abilities, whose power depends on their rarity.

Operators are divided into eight classes—Vanguard, Guard, Defender, Sniper, Specialist, Medic, Caster, and Supporter—each with multiple sub-classes. Melee operators can be placed on ground tiles and ranged operators on elevated tiles. Melee operators physically block enemies from advancing, and ranged operators deal ranged damage, heal or otherwise support melee operators. Players must place operators on the correct tiles to prevent the enemy from infiltrating the player's base. Once in place, an operator's skills can be activated after a time for special effects, or they can be withdrawn for redeployment after a delay.

Because there is often a limited number of viable solutions, especially at high difficulties, Arknights has also been described as a puzzle game. The gameplay normally does not require quick reaction times (the game is pauseable, and time slows down while commands are issued), but rather on-the-spot tactical analysis and foresight.

As the player progresses through the game, they unlock more stages, operators and resources, and are also introduced to new types of enemies and gameplay mechanics. Levels that have been cleared with a three-star rating without using a borrowed support unit can then be auto-completed without player input, as the game records the player's actions and replicates them.

The game also has a base-building aspect, which allows players to construct facilities and assign operators to them. This allows players to increase their resources in the manner of an incremental game. It features the usual array of free-to-play, gacha game mechanics, such as daily login rewards and randomized character acquisition through virtual currency which can be obtained by playing the game, through limited-time events, or optional in-app purchases using real currency. Because of the limited resources available (even if real money is spent), another layer of challenge lies in "internalizing multiple complex economic systems" and in prioritizing the right operators to recruit and develop in order to build a capable roster. Arknights players have created a number of internet resources and tools to assist in this effort.

Arknights feature several permanent game modes to introduce more complex mechanics to the game, and unlike the regular stages, these game modes do not consume sanity (the game's energy) to play and clear. A roguelike game mode, "Integrated Strategies", was added in 2022. A survival game mode, "Reclamation Algorithm", where players need to gather resources such as wood and build their base to fend off enemy raids was added in 2023. A game mode inspired by deck building games called Stationary Security Service was added in 2022.

Aside from permanent game modes, Arknights features seasonal events that add more complex but optional challenges and handicaps, such as the semi-quarterly Contingency Contract. Trials for Navigator is a boss rush event where players must fend off multiple waves of enemies, including a boss, in a single operation. Icebreaker Games is a cooperative event where players can team up in real time to tackle challenges together. Duel Channel pits enemies against each other, with players guessing which side will win. Stronghold Protocol offers an autochess-like experience, while Vector Breakthrough challenges players with multi-battle combat scenarios and an evolving boss. These events reward players with resources and medals.

== Plot ==
The game is set in the dystopian, apocalyptic future setting of the planet Terra, where people exhibit kemonomimi features – characteristics of animals or mythological races. Natural disasters leave behind a valuable mineral, Originium, which infects people with a progressive disease, Oripathy, but can also enhance the ability to use "Arts" (magic). Because Oripathy is infectious under certain conditions and invariably fatal, the infected are shunned and persecuted. In response, some of them form the Reunion movement, a militant group waging war on the despotic governments of Terra.

The main story and some event storylines of Arknights revolve around the estrangement of people infected with Originium and the conflicts that ensue between the infected and the non-infected. The conflicts among the countries of Terra, the struggles of various communities and divisions among various races, and the battles between humans and non-human creatures are important components of the worldview and plot of the game.

The player takes the role of the masked and amnesiac "Doctor", who commands a team of "operators" of Rhodes Island, a pharmaceutical, medical, and self-defense organization. As Oripathy spreads, Rhodes Island searches for a cure while defending itself against Reunion and several of the governments of Terra.

== Music and voice acting ==
Arknights' soundtrack draws on a range of Western and Asian musical genres. Hypergryph has partnered with musical groups across the world to release Arknights-related songs and music videos. These include Steve Aoki ("Last of Me"), Yellow Claw ("End Like This"), Starset ("Infected"), and Low Roar ("Feels", later re-released as "Fade Away"). Contributing composers include Go Shiina, Kevin Penkin and Adam Gubman.

The Arknights-related song "Renegade" written by Jason Walsh and performed by Substantial and X.ARI was nominated for "Best Original Song – Video Game" at the 2020 Hollywood Music in Media Awards.

The game's characters are initially voiced exclusively in Japanese and Standard Chinese. Korean and English voice acting is being incrementally added, with the game achieving full English voiceovers in 2025. Individual characters are also voiced in other languages such as Italian, German, Russian, and regional Sinitic languages, as well as speaking English with an emphasis on localized accents, and even code switching, to reflect their origin from the analogous region of the game's world.

== Reception ==
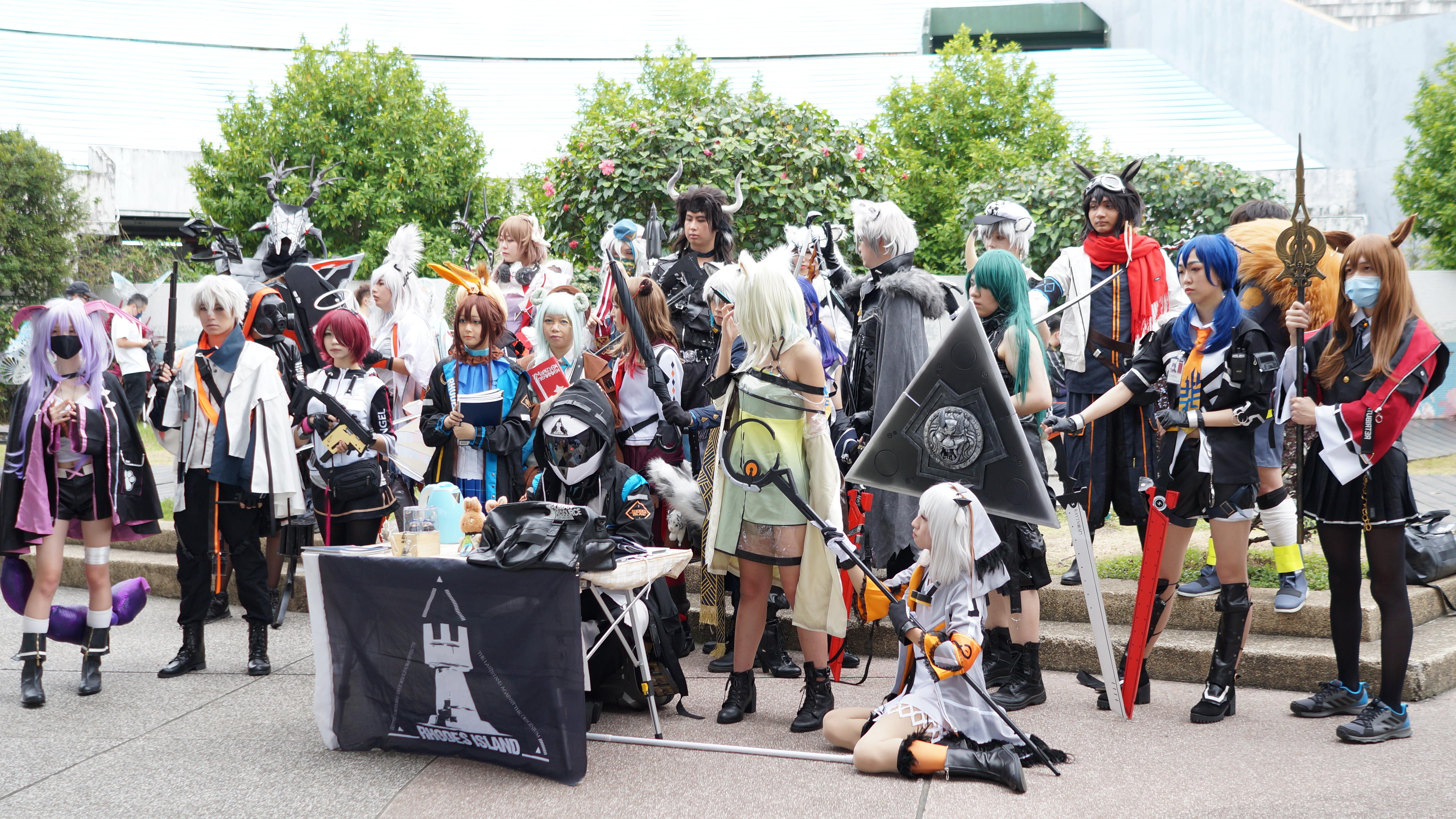
Cosplay of Arknights characters

Pocket Gamer highlighted the game's extensive lore and high production values. Julia Lee of Polygon said that the gacha system is better than in Nintendo and Cygames' Dragalia Lost, and wrote that "Arknights is the only gacha game I recommend to people" because of its art design, lack of purchase pressure and competition, and limited grind, and Sisi Jiang of Kotaku noted that Arknights is rare among gacha games in that its easily obtainable characters are better in some circumstances than the game's rare, high-powered operators.

The game was nominated for Google Play "Users' Choice Game" at the Best of 2020 awards and for "Best Science Fiction or Fantasy Mobile Game" at the 2020 Dragon Awards. It won an award as one of the Best Innovative Games of 2020.

== Anime ==
Yostar Pictures' anime adaptation of Arknights has been airing since late 2022. As of July 2025, the anime has three seasons.
