= Rubberbullet =

American art rock band

rubberbullet
- Origin: Dallas, Texas
- Genres: rock, avant-garde, experimental
- Years active: 1993–1997
- Labels: Last Beat Records
- Members: Earl Harvin, Aaron Berlin, Richard Paul, Johnathan Mulkey, Beth Clardy

Rubberbullet was an art rock band from Dallas, Texas in the 1990s. The band was formed and led by drummer Earl Harvin in 1993. Described as avant-garde noise rock, their first album, rubberbullet, included "free-jazz jams" of guitars, a tribal and funky rhythm section and ranting vocals. According to music critic Robert Wilonsky, their music was at once both "overpowering" and "beautiful". Over time recordings moved towards modern-rock. Members included Aaron Berlin on guitar, Richard Paul on guitar, Johnathan Mulkey on bass and Beth Clardy fronting with vocals. The band was put on hold and eventually disbanded when Harvin began touring with Seal and prioritized the jazz project Earl Harvin Trio.

== Discography ==
- Grinning Bitches/Entangled 7" (1994; Last Beat Records)
- rubberbullet (1995; Last Beat Records)
- Open (1996; Last Beat Record])
- The Kissing Song/King Of The Damned Lazer Gag 7" [split w/ Baboon] (1997; Last Beat Records)
