= Unincorporated (album) =

Studio album by Earl Harvin Trio
- Released: 2001
- Recorded: by David Willingham at Dub Studio, Austin, TX
- Genre: Jazz, groove
- Length: 66:30
- Label: Two Ohm Hop
- Producer: David Willingham and Earl Harvin Trio

Professional ratings
Review scores
| Source | Rating |
|---|---|
| Dallas Observer | link |

Unincorporated is a 2001 studio album by Earl Harvin Trio. The album includes a variety of styles extending beyond jazz "layering rhythmic textures and harmonic nuance".

== Musicians ==
- Earl Harvin – drums, electric bass, Wurlitzer
- Dave Palmer – Rhodes, Wurlitzer, piano, samples
- Fred Hamilton – bass, guitar, banjo, Hindustani slide guitar

== Track listing ==
1. "Manitou Inclined"
2. "Sun City"
3. "Improv 1"
4. "Osiris"
5. "Mr. Natural"
6. "Improv 2"
7. "Debashish"
8. "Blue Fred"
9. "Lily"
10. "Improv 3"
