= 0 (album) =

- Cover art by Anna Giudice and Valeria Morando

Studio album by Low Roar
- Released: 2014
- Genre: Post-rock; electronica; dream pop
- Length: 68:14
- Label: Tonequake Records
- Producer: Low Roar; Mike Lindsay; Andrew Scheps

Low Roar chronology
Low Roar (2011)	0 (2014)	Once in a Long, Long While... (2017)

Professional ratings
Review scores
Source	Rating
Iceland Review	4/5 stars
Sputnikmusic	5/5

0 is the second studio album by the Icelandic musical project Low Roar, released on July 8, 2014 through Tonequake Records.

"I'll Keep Coming" and "Easy Way Out" became well known in 2016 when they were featured as the trailer music for Hideo Kojima's video game Death Stranding, in addition to an episode of Killjoys. "Breathe In" was featured in the animated documentary film Flee. The artwork, designed by Anna Giudice and Valeria Morando won the contest "Best Design" organized by FÍT.

== Track listing ==
No.	Title	Length
1.	"Breathe In"	7:34
2.	"Easy Way Out"	4:48
3.	"Nobody Loves Me Like You"	5:55
4.	"I'll Keep Coming"	5:52
5.	"Half Asleep"	7:15
6.	"Please Don't Stop (Chapter 1)"	4:40
7.	"I'm Leaving"	5:34
8.	"In the Morning"	1:24
9.	"Phantoms"	6:03
10.	"Anything You Need"	3:13
11.	"Dreamer"	5:09
12.	"Vampire on My Fridge"	6:30
13.	"Please Don't Stop (Chapter 2)"	4:02
Total length:		68:14

== Personnel ==
Low Roar

- Ryan Karazija – all noises (except as noted), producer, recording
- Mike Lindsay – vocals on "Half Asleep", producer, recording
- Andrew Scheps – bass, keyboards, theremin and modular synths on "Nobody Loves Me Like You", "Half Asleep", "Anything You Need", "Dreamer", "Please Don't Stop (Chapter 1)", "Please Don't Stop (Chapter 2)", and "I'm Leaving", producer, recording, mixing

Additional personnel

- Amiina – strings on "Breathe In", "Phantoms", "Vampire on my Fridge", and "Please Don't Stop (Chapter 2)"
- Maria Huld Markan Sigfúsdóttir – strings on "I'll Keep Coming" and "I'm Leaving"
- Sigurlaug Gísladóttir – vocals on "I'll Keep Coming", "Please Don't Stop (Chapter 1)" and "Please Don't Stop (Chapter 2)"
- Kristín Björk Kristjánsdóttir – vocals and programming on "Anything You Need"
- Chris Bellman – vinyl cut
- Anna Giudice– artwork
- Valeria Morando – artwork

== Year-end charts ==
Chart (2016)	Position
Icelandic Albums (Plötutíóindi)	39
