= Once in a Long, Long While... =

Studio album by Low Roar
- Released: April 14, 2017
- Genre: Post-rock, electronica, dream pop
- Length: 49:27
- Label: Tonequake Records
- Producer: Andrew Scheps; Mike Lindsay; Ryan Karazija

Low Roar chronology
0 (2014)	Once in a Long, Long While... (2017)	ross. (2019)

Singles from Once in a Long, Long While...
- 1. "Waiting (10 Years)" Released: March 23, 2017

Once in a Long, Long While... is the third studio album by Icelandic musical project Low Roar, released on April 14, 2017. The album's lyrics are inspired by Ryan Karazija's recent divorce and his life as an expatriate in Iceland. One reviewer described the album as "flow[ing] between dreamy and floating and more solidly rhythmic tracks," and another described it as having an "atmosphere [that] never permits the sun to linger for very long, shutting it out with harsh, icy synth." The song “Waiting (10 Years)" was released as a single.

The opening track, Don't Be So Serious, was used as the opening song for the 2019 game Death Stranding, with many other tracks being featured on the soundtrack as well.

== Track listing ==
No.	Title	Length
1.	"Don't Be So Serious"	6:13
2.	"Bones"	2:50
3.	"St. Eriksplan"	3:41
4.	"Give Me an Answer"	3:43
5.	"Waiting (10 Years)"	4:05
6.	"Without You"	3:54
7.	"Gosia"	4:13
8.	"Once In a Long, Long While..."	5:17
9.	"Crawl Back"	4:09
10.	"Poznan"	2:03
11.	"Miserably"	3:55
12.	"13"	5:24
Total length:		49:27

B sides
No.	Title	Length
1.	"The Sky is Falling"	4:34
2.	"I Won't Be Long"	2:22
Total length:		6:57

== Personnel ==
Low Roar

- Ryan Karazija – all noises (except as noted), producer, recording, mixing
- Mike Lindsay – all noises (except as noted), producer, recording, mixing
- Andrew Scheps – all noises (except as noted), producer, recording, mixing

Additional personnel

- Jófríður Ákadóttir – vocals on "Bones"
- Juan Pablo González – piano on "Bones" and "Miserably", additional recording
- Hannah Peel – trombone on "Waiting (10 Years)" and "St. Eriksplan"
- Laura J. Martin – flute on "St. Eriksplan" and "Gosia"
- Carlos Metta – piano on "Miserably"
- José Villagómez – trombone on "Miserably"
- Anton Patzner – strings on "Miserably"
