= Einar Kristjánsson =

Icelandic alpine skier (1934–1996)

Einar Valur Kristjánsson
Personal information
- Nationality: Icelandic
- Born: 16 August 1934; Ísafjörður, Kingdom of Iceland
- Died: 7 September 1996 (aged 62); Ísafjörður, Iceland

Sport
- Sport: Alpine skiing

Einar Valur Kristjánsson (16 August 1934 – 7 September 1996) was an Icelandic alpine skier. He competed in two events at the 1956 Winter Olympics. He also played football for ÍBÍ and Víkingur Reykjavík.

== Personal life ==
Kristjánsson's son, Atli Einarsson, was a member of the Icelandic national football team between 1990 and 1992, and won the Icelandic football championship in 1991 as a member of Víkingur Reykjavík.
