= Low Roar =

Icelandic post-rock band

- Ryan Karazija, performing in 2017

Background information
- Origin: Reykjavík, Iceland
- Genres: Indie folk; dream pop; post-rock; electronic; ambient
- Years active: 2011–2022
- Labels: Tonequake; Nevado Music
- Spinoff of: Audrye Sessions
- Past members: Ryan Karazija: Andrew Scheps; Mike Lindsay; Logi Guðmundsson; Leifur Björnsson
- Website: lowroarmusic.com

Low Roar was a post-rock and electronic music project founded by American-born Icelandic musician Ryan Joseph Karazija. Originally a solo act, the band later added musicians Leifur Björnsson and Logi Guðmundsson. Producers/sound engineers Mike Lindsay (of British folk band Tunng) and Andrew Scheps, who produced Low Roar's music from 0 and on, were later also credited as members of the band.

Karazija formed the band in Reykjavík after marrying an Icelandic woman and immigrating there, following the dissolution of his previous band Audrye Sessions. Low Roar would later be permanently relocated to Warsaw, Poland in 2016. Following their music's prominent inclusion on the soundtrack of 2019 video game, Death Stranding, Low Roar's music would gain significant popularity.

After releasing five albums spanning over a decade, the band and the project itself was discontinued following the death of Karazija in October 2022, due to complications from pneumonia. A posthumous sixth album, House in the Woods, which was already in production at the time of his passing, was released on February 7, 2025.

== History ==
=== Formation, Low Roar, and 0 (2011 – 2014) ===
The band's logo

After leading the Oakland-based indie rock band Audrye Sessions from 2002 to 2010, Karazija relocated to Reykjavík, Iceland. He immigrated to be with his then-wife, an Icelandic woman. He created Low Roar as a way to chronicle his struggles in acclimating to his new environment and support his family - the consequent loneliness and hardship of which would form the lyrical basis of self-titled debut album, Low Roar, released in 2011. Karazija wrote the album in his kitchen at home, in between working 12-hour shifts at a recycling factory.

For Low Roar’s sophomore album, Karazija would be joined by drummer Logi Guðmundsson and keyboardist Leifur Björnsson, now recording music in a proper studio environment. 0 was released in 2014 through Tonequake Records. Whilst touring the album, Reykjavík chamber folk/post-rock outfit Amiina, who had also contributed instrumentals on several songs, would be enlisted as the band's string section.

=== Once in a Long, Long While, ross., and Death Stranding (2015 – 2019) ===
Karazija spent most of 2016 traveling to various parts of the world, including Sweden, Mexico, and his native Bay Area. During this time, he was experiencing major life changes: he was undergoing a divorce and had recently welcomed the birth of his nephew. He stated in a 2019 feature with Mystic Sons, "A recent relationship had just ended ... I just needed to get these songs out ... I was documenting my life as it was happening.” In the end, Karazija permanently relocated to Warsaw, Poland. It was during this period that he worked on what would become Low Roar's third full-length album. In April 2016, whilst traveling, he had entered a London studio for a week to begin work on the record together with Lindsay. By the end of August, recording concluded in Wales in the studio of Scheps. Once in a Long, Long While... was released in 2017 on Nevado Music Fourth studio album, ross., would in November 2019 on Tonequake.

Renowned Japanese video game designer Hideo Kojima, known for his creation of the Metal Gear franchise, chanced upon Low Roar's music in a CD shop in Reykjavík in 2014. He would go on to praise Karazija's music as "sensual" and his sounds as "unique". He chose "I'll Keep Coming" and "Easy Way Out" off 0 to be featured on the game's two 2016 trailers. When Sony first contacted the band to license their music for Death Stranding, Low Roar had been struggling.

“Sony contacted us in an obscure email offering us a certain amount of money to use the song ‘I’ll Keep Coming’, and they were not willing to tell us what they’re going to use the song for ... At that time we were in a gutter so we accepted it. And it turned out it was for Death Stranding.”

— Ryan Karazija, 2020 VG247 interview

Various Low Roar songs off their first four albums would end up being featured on the game's soundtrack (later released as Death Stranding - Songs from the Video Game) alongside the likes of Silent Poets, CHVRCHES, and Apocalyptica. This would have a significant, positive influence on the band's popularity.

=== maybe tomorrow..., Karazija's death & posthumous projects (2020 – Present) ===
In 2021, Low Roar recorded the song "Feels" for the mobile game Arknights, later released in full under the title "Fade Away" on maybe tomorrow..., which would be released in July 2021 by Tonequake. At this point, Lindsay and Scheps, who have produced all Low Roar material starting from 0, would for the first time be credited as members of the band.

On 29 October 2022, it was announced that Ryan Karazija, founder and lead singer of the band, had died at the age of 40. Hours later, it was revealed that the cause of death was from complications with pneumonia. On Twitter (now X), Kojima paid tribute, "I heard the news. I can't believe it. I don't want to believe it. Without Ryan, without you and your music, Death Stranding would not have been born. Your music will live forever in this world and in me. Thank you. Rest in peace."

Scheps announced on 27 October 2024 that the sixth Low Roar album, House in the Woods, was finished, along with a release date of February 7, 2025. Additionally, he announced two singles in support of the album; "Field of Dreams", releasing on 6 December 2024, and "Just How It Goes", releasing on 3 January 2025.

Death Stranding 2: On the Beach, the sequel to the 2019 video game, featured more songs by Low Roar. These included "Patience" from the self-titled debut, "Hummingbird" from maybe tomorrow..., as well as "Field Of Dreams" and "Just How It Goes" from House in the Woods. The game also contains visual references to the band, and end credits of the game feature a tribute message to them. A concert tour, titled Death Stranding: Strands of Harmony, ran from late 2025 to early 2026, featuring songs composed by him.

== Musical style ==
Low Roar's music has included elements of folk, electronica, dream pop, ambient music, and post-rock. Although Karazija has refrained from explicitly citing his influences in interviews, Low Roar has frequently been compared to Icelandic post-rock outfit Sigur Rós, and English art rock band Radiohead. In particular, Karazija's falsetto voice has been likened to that of Radiohead frontman, Thom Yorke. Other comparisons of his vocal style include Justin Vernon of Bon Iver, Jónsi of Sigur Rós, Liz Harris of Grouper, and Julianna Barwick.

The project has also collaborated with Icelandic contemporaries such as Amiina, Múm, and Jófríður Ákadóttir. Critics have noted that the project's music draws aesthetic influence from the cultural and geographical isolation of Iceland. Karazija's lyrics tackle a variety of themes - including heartbreak, betrayal, and emotional isolation. The lyrics of Low Roar were inspired by his difficulties in finding work and adjusting to life in Iceland, whilst that on Once in a Long, Long Time reflected the heartbreak of a separation and divorce.

== Discography ==
=== Albums ===
- Low Roar (2011)
- 0 (2014)
- Once in a Long, Long While... (2017)
- ross. (2019)
- maybe tomorrow... (2021)
- House in the Woods (2025)

=== EPs ===
- Casio Dream House (2014)
- Hávallagata 30 (2014)
- Remix – EP (2015)
- Inure (2020)

=== Live albums ===
- Live at Gamla Bíó (2015)

=== Singles ===
- "Waiting (10 Years)" (2017)
- "The Sky Is Falling" (2018)
- "I Won't Be Long" (2018)
- "Slow Down" (2019)
- "Darkest Hour" (2019)
- "Do You Miss Me?" (2020)
- "Everything to Lose" (2021)
- "Hummingbird" (2021)
- "Field of Dreams" (2024)
- "Just How It Goes" (2025)

=== Soundtrack appearances ===
- Death Stranding - Songs from the Video Game (2020)
- Flee (2021)
- Death Stranding 2 - Songs from the Video Game (2025)
