= A Thousand Shark's Teeth =

Studio album by My Brightest Diamond
- Released: 2 June 2008
- Genre: Indie rock
- Length: 46:02
- Label: Asthmatic Kitty

My Brightest Diamond chronology
Tear It Down (2007)	A Thousand Shark's Teeth (2008)	Shark Remixes Volumes 1, 2, 3 & 4 (2010)

A Thousand Shark's Teeth is the second studio album from the American rock group My Brightest Diamond.

== Content ==
The eleven-track album was released on vinyl, compact disc, and digital download with Asthmatic Kitty, on 2 June 2008. It was produced and arranged by Worden, and recorded in Los Angeles, California and New York City, and Berlin, Germany, by Husky Höskulds, who also mixed the album. The album took six years to complete, and was originally conceived to be recorded as string quartet pieces. In comparison with their prior album, Tear It Down, A Thousand Shark's Teeth contains more orchestration, elegant instrumentation and arrangements, and features soprano and pizzicato strings, strings, keys and percussion. It draws comparison to the music of French composer Maurice Ravel, musicians Tricky, Evelyn Glennie and Tom Waits, and the group Portishead.

The bonus track "The Gentlest Gentleman" was included with a download of the album via the iTunes store.

== Reception ==
Professional ratings
Review scores
Source	Rating
Allmusic	3.5/5 stars
The A.V. Club	C+
Robert Christgau	(dud)
Pitchfork Media	(6.1/10)
Popmatters	(7/10)

A review by AllMusic says that "strangely, despite the album's elaborate scope, at times A Thousand Shark's Teeth is too subtle to make a strong initial impression. However, when the album does connect -- usually when the arrangements and melodies are more direct -- the results are stunning. As it stands, A Thousand Shark's Teeth is beautiful, more than a little insular, and ultimately intriguing for anyone willing to listen closely." Pitchfork calls Worden "a creative chameleon with endless wells of technical skill," and says the song "The Gentlest Gentleman" is a "stunningly simple ukelee ditty [that] gives the singer away more than a thousand of violins ever could."

PopMatters says it is "a swooning, big-gestured album to get lost in[,] discovering new complexities and subtleties each time." A mixed review from The A.V. Club describes A Thousand Shark's Teeth as a "bleaker, creepier expansion of Worden's symphonic rock," but note the song "From the Top of the World" "balanc[es] space, ambient hissing, darkness, mystery, and melody with the patience that made Workhorse catch on."

== Track listing ==
All tracks are written by Shara Worden.

No.	Title	Length
1.	"Inside a Boy"	3:43
2.	"The Ice & The Storm"	5:22
3.	"If I Were Queen"	2:37
4.	"Apples"	2:28
5.	"From the Top of the World"	4:02
6.	"Black & Costaud"	4:22
7.	"To Pluto's Moon"	6:49
8.	"Bass Player"	4:33
9.	"Goodbye Forever"	3:53
10.	"Like a Sieve"	3:03
11.	"The Diamond"	5:02
Total length:		46:02
