= Ryan Karazija =

American singer-songwriter (1982–2022)

- Born: Ryan Joseph Karazija; March 19, 1982; Santa Clara, California, U.S.
- Died: October 27 (Note: Karazija's exact date of death is unclear due to conflicting reports. An Instagram post by Low Roar on November 11, 2023, lists his death date as October 27. The Death Stranding: Strands of Harmony concert program lists his death date as October 28. Additionally, websites such as Game Developer claim he died on October 29.), 2022 (aged 40)
- Genres: Post-rock, electronic, indie rock
- Occupations: Musician, singer-songwriter
- Years active: 2002–2022
- Formerly of: Low Roar; Audrye Sessions

Ryan Joseph Karazija (March 19, 1982 – October 27, 2022) was an American singer-songwriter known as the founder and lead vocalist of the Icelandic post-rock/electronic music project Low Roar, as well as fronting the Oakland-based indie band Audrye Sessions.

His music garnered international popularity through its prominent inclusion in the 2019 video game Death Stranding. His compositions often feature melancholic themes, ambient textures, and introspective lyrics.

== Early life ==
Ryan Karazija was born on March 19, 1982 to Belinda Cañas Karazija of Mexican descent and Victor G. Karazija of Lithuanian descent. At the age of 16, Karazija began playing the guitar and started learning music. He grew up in San Jose, California and graduated from Abraham Lincoln High School. He developed an early interest in music and was drawn to alternative rock, folk, and ambient music. At age 18, Karazija dropped out of college while he was studying psychology to pursue music and become a musician.

== Career ==
=== Audrye Sessions (2002–2010) ===
In 2002, Karazija formed the indie rock band Audrye Sessions, where he served as the lead vocalist and guitarist. Later, bassist Alicia Marie Campbell, drummer James Leste and guitarist Michael Knox joined the band. Karazija and Campbell entered a relationship, which eventually ended. The band gained some recognition in the Oakland music scene and released a self-titled album in 2009 through Black Seal, a subsidiary of RCA Records. During that time, Karazija met producer Andrew Scheps, who he'd work closely with in the following years.

After a final performance in Oakland, the band disbanded in 2010, prompting Karazija to seek new creative avenues.

=== Low Roar (2011–2025) ===
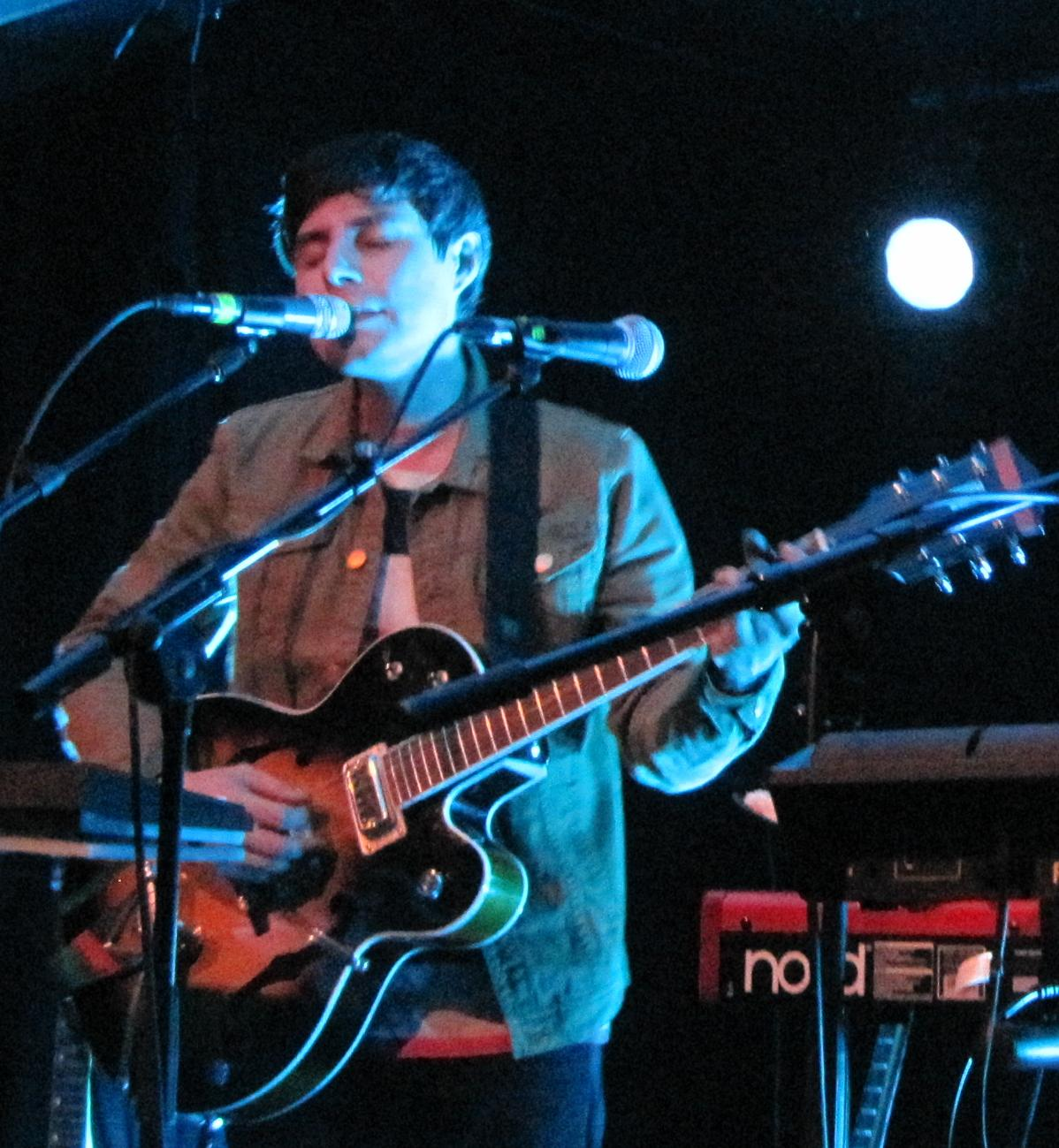
Karazija in 2012

In 2010, Karazija relocated to Reykjavík, Iceland due to his marrying an Icelandic woman. He was drawn to Iceland's stark landscapes and rich musical heritage, which significantly influenced his subsequent work. In 2011, he founded the musical project Low Roar as a deeply personal endeavor, crafting intimate and ethereal compositions that blended post-rock, electronic music, and folk elements whilst recording in his kitchen.

Initially a solo project, Low Roar's self-titled debut album was released in 2011. The album was characterized by a stripped-down, melancholic sound that reflected Karazija’s experiences of isolation and adaptation to life in Iceland. Recorded with minimal production, the album received critical praise for its raw emotional depth and atmospheric soundscapes.

In 2014, Low Roar released 0, which featured a richer, more layered production, incorporating electronic beats, synthesizers, and intricate instrumentation. The album signified an evolution in Karazija's sound, moving beyond the minimalism of the debut and embracing a fuller sonic palette. Tracks such as "I'll Keep Coming" and "Easy Way Out" gained particular attention.

Beginning in 2016, Low Roar's music reached a global audience when several of their songs were featured in the video game Death Stranding, developed by Kojima Productions and directed by Hideo Kojima. Kojima discovered Low Roar's music in a record store in Reykjavík and felt it perfectly matched the tone of the game, using their songs in trailers advertising the game as well as for the soundtrack of the game itself. The exposure introduced Low Roar to a broader audience and significantly boosted the project's popularity. "Don't Be So Serious", the opening track from their third studio album Once in a Long, Long While... (2017), was featured as the opening track of the game, and tracks from their fourth studio album ross. (2019), which released on the same day as the game, were also featured.

Following the success of Death Stranding, maybe tomorrow... (2021) was released, which would later become the band's final album released during his lifetime.

== Death and legacy ==
On October 29, 2022, it was announced Karazija died at the age of 40 due to complications from pneumonia. In response, Death Stranding creator Hideo Kojima stated online, "without Ryan... Death Stranding would not have been born."

In 2023, a piano rendition of "Don't Be So Serious" was performed during the In Memoriam tribute segment at the 19th British Academy Games Awards.

A posthumous album, House in the Woods, was released on February 7, 2025. The album, assembled from Karazija's final recordings and unfinished works, serves as a final tribute to his artistic vision and legacy.

The end credits of the 2025 video game Death Stranding 2: On the Beach feature a tribute message to Karazija and the band itself. The game contains posters referencing the band and features a handful of the band's songs, including "Field of Dreams" and "Just How It Goes" from the posthumous album. A concert tour, titled Death Stranding: Strands of Harmony, ran from late 2025 to early 2026 and featured songs composed by Karazija.

In 2026, the song "Nobody Loves Me Like You" was featured in the season two finale of Netflix's Beef.

== Discography ==
=== With Audrye Sessions ===
- Audrye Sessions (2009)

=== With Low Roar ===
- Low Roar (2011)
- 0 (2014)
- Once in a Long, Long While... (2017)
- ross. (2019)
- maybe tomorrow... (2021)
- House in the Woods (2025; posthumously released)
