= Audrye Sessions =

American band

- Origin: Oakland, California
- Genres: Indie rock - Dream pop
- Years active: 2002–2010
- Label: Black Seal
- Past members: Ryan Karazija; Alicia Marie Campbell; Michael Knox; James Leste

Audrye Sessions was an American indie rock band fronted by Ryan Karazija.

== History ==
Audrye Sessions was founded in 2002 by singer Ryan Karazija, who was later joined by Alicia Marie Campbell. Soon after, Michael Knox joined the band through a Craigslist ad. They began playing coffeehouses in their hometown of Livermore, California. In a San Francisco Chronicle profile, they described themselves as having a "very Brit-rock feel like the Beatles meet Muse." The band has been compared to Muse, Coldplay, Oasis, Radiohead, and The Verve.

In 2007 they won a spot on Live 105's BFD summer concert, and played at San Francisco's Noise Pop and Austin's SXSW music festivals. Their final line-up consisted of Karazija, Campbell, Knox, and James Leste. Musicians who also performed or toured with Audrye Sessions include violinist Anton Patzner and drummer Alex Feldman.

They released a self-titled Audrye Sessions EP in October 2008 through Black Seal, a unit of RCA Records. The band's self-titled full-length album was released on February 17, 2009. In the fall of 2009, they recorded "Turn Me Off" in Simlish. The song was later featured in The Sims 3: World Adventures, the first expansion pack for The Sims 3.

Their music was featured in the television show Celebrity Rehab with Dr. Drew. In the summer of 2010, they released an EP called An Otherwise Perfect Day. On August 27, 2010, the band performed their final show in Oakland. Ryan Karazija subsequently relocated to Reykjavík, Iceland and started the new band Low Roar.

== Discography ==
=== Albums ===
- Audrye Sessions (2009), Black Seal

=== EPs ===
- Audrye Sessions EP (2008), Black Seal
- An Otherwise Perfect Day (2010), Tonequake
