= My Brightest Diamond =

Chamber rock band of Shara Worden

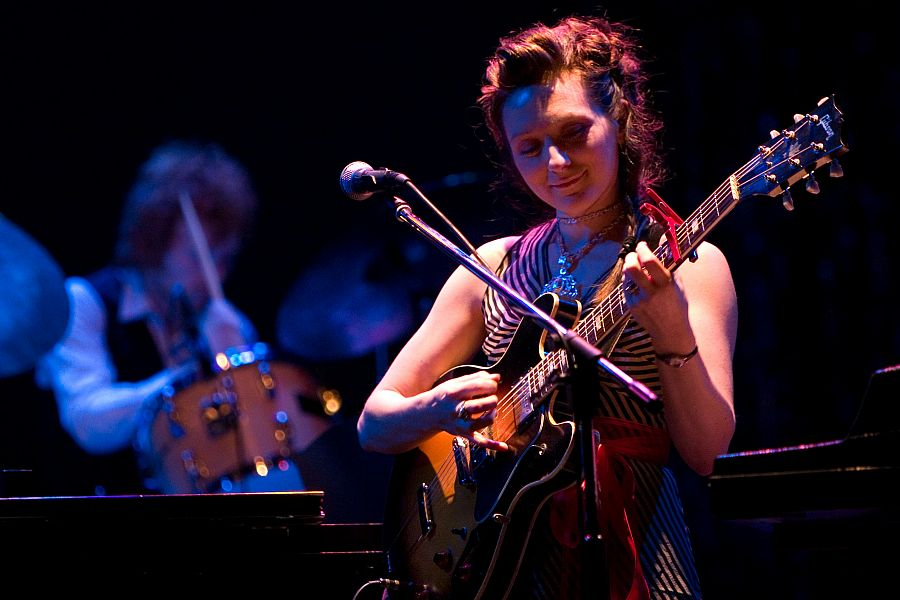
- Shara Nova performing with My Brightest Diamond at the Pabst Theater, in 2006.

Background information
- Origin: New York City, New York, U.S.
- Genres: Indie rock, baroque pop, chamber folk
- Years active: 2006–present
- Labels: Asthmatic Kitty, Paper Bag Records, Rhyme & Reason Records, Western Vinyl
- Members: Shara Nova
- Website: www.mybrightestdiamond.com

My Brightest Diamond is the project of singer-songwriter and multi-instrumentalist Shara Nova. The band has released five studio albums and a remix album, five studio EPs and four remix EPs, and made several tours across the United States.

== History ==
Nova began performing and recording music while she was a student at the University of North Texas, in Denton, Texas. She released an album, entitled Word in 1998, under the name Shara. Following her completion of a Bachelor of Music degree in Classical Vocal Performance, Nova moved to Moscow, Russia, where she documented several newly written songs and released them on CD-R's as an album entitled Session I, which included hand-made artwork. In 1999, she moved to Brooklyn, New York City, writing music that blended elements of her classical training with chamber music, and avant-garde rock music she discovered in the underground rock scene, at venues such at Tonic, The Living Room, and the Knitting Factory. She began performing and recording under the moniker AwRy, and gathered the support of a group of musicians, who played a variety of non-traditional instruments including wine glasses and wind chimes. Eventually, Nova and the group added a string quartet after studying and collaborating with the Australian composer Padma Newsome. She released an eponymous album in 2001, which was mostly a reworking of songs from the album Word, and is often referred to as The Orange Album; Quiet B-Sides, as well as a remix album in 2003.

Nova contributed xylophone, keyboard, and backing vocals to the CD Recession Special of Bogs Visionary Orchestra in 2003. After meeting fellow transplanted Michigander Sufjan Stevens, she became part of his touring string section, named the Illinoisemakers. Nova took a hiatus from her own work to perform with Stevens' Illinois tour, as cheerleading captain. When the tour concluded, Nova renamed her project My Brightest Diamond, and began recording for two albums; the first, a collection of songs performed with a string quartet entitled A Thousand Shark's Teeth, and the second, a rock-oriented album entitled Bring Me the Workhorse. The latter was released on Asthmatic Kitty in the Summer of 2006. My Brightest Diamond toured with Stevens in the Fall of 2006 in support of Bring Me the Workhorse, and in early 2007, the group toured in support on the indie rock band The Decemberists, as part of their "Twilight in the Fearful Forest" tour. A Thousand Shark's Teeth was released worldwide on Asthmatic Kitty on June 2, 2008, with a tour of the United States beginning on June 17.

My Brightest Diamond contributed a cover of the Radiohead song "Lucky" for the 2007 Stereogum tribute album, Stereogum Presents... OKX: A Tribute to OK Computer. They recorded a cover of the Gloria Jones and Soft Cell song "Tainted Love" for the Engine Room Recordings' compilation album, Guilt by Association Vol. 2, which was released in November 2008. The group contributed a cover of the Anthony Newley and Leslie Bricusse song "Feeling Good" for the Red Hot Organization's compilation Dark Was the Night, released in 2009, and appear on the David Byrne and Fatboy Slim 2010 album, Here Lies Love.

All Things Will Unwind was released on October 18, 2011. The album was initially a compositional project for a program called The American Songbook Series. The title was inspired by a conversation Nova had with a friend, about the Sun burning out. In 2014, My Brightest Diamond released their fourth album, This Is My Hand which Nova wrote imagining a tribe of people gathered around a fire, who were making music together, telling stories and hearing from the shaman. The album peaked on the Billboard charts on 4 October 2014, at No. 50. The EP None More Than You was also released that year. They made their first release on Rhyme & Reason Records with the electronic-leaning album A Million and One, which PopMatters describes as "display[ing] My Brightest Diamond's experimental range [and] Nova's crystalline voice."

== Members ==
- Shara Nova – Vocals, Guitar, Keyboards, Percussion, Drum Programming
- Chris Bruce – Guitar, Bass
- Earl Harvin – Drums, Drum Programming

=== Live Members ===
- Jharis Yokley – Drums

=== Past members ===
- Hideaki Aomori
- CJ Camerieri
- Marla Hansen
- Maria Jeffers
- Clarice Jensen
- Nathan Lithgow
- Olivier Manchon
- Rob Moose
- Zac Rae
- Nadia Sirota
- Alex Sopp
- Aaron Steele
- Brian Wolfe

== Discography ==
Albums

- Bring Me the Workhorse (2006)
- A Thousand Shark's Teeth (2008)
- All Things Will Unwind (2011)
- This Is My Hand (2014)
- A Million and One (2018)
- Fight the Real Terror (2024)

Remix albums

- Tear It Down (2007)
- Shark Remixes Volumes 1, 2, 3 & 4 (2010)

EPs

- Disappear (August 18, 2006)
- From the Top of the World (September 23, 2008)
- None More Than You (July 15, 2014)
- I Had Grown Wild (May 19, 2015)
- Champagne (April 27, 2018)

Remix EPs

- Shark Remixes, Vol. 1: Alfred Brown (October 27, 2008)
- Shark Remixes, Vol. 2.: Son Lux (January 20, 2009)
- Shark Remixes, Vol. 3: Roberto Carlos Lange (May 31, 2009)
- Shark Remixes, Vol. 4: DM Stith (January 26, 2010)

Singles

- "Inside a Boy" (June 17, 2008)
- "From the Top of the World" (September 23, 2008)
- "Be Brave" (September 20, 2011)
- "I Have Never Loved Someone" (April 21, 2012)
- "Ceci Est Ma Main" (April 22, 2015)
- "Right Here With You (featuring Ben Arthur & DJ Big WIZ)" (2015)
- "Champagne FR" (2018)
- "Quiet Loud" (2019)

Appearing on

- "Lucky" for Stereogum Presents... OKX: A Tribute to OK Computer (2007)
- "Tainted Love" for Guilt by Association Vol. 2 (2008)
- "Feeling Good" for Dark Was the Night (2009)
- "Impossible Soul" for The Age of Adz (2010)
