= DM Stith =

American singer-songwriter

- Born: David Michael Stith
- Genres: Indie folk, baroque pop, psychedelic folk, folk rock, alternative rock
- Occupations: Musician, singer-songwriter
- Instruments: Vocals, guitar, piano,
- Years active: 2006–present
- Labels: Asthmatic Kitty, Historical Fiction Records
- Website: Official website

David Michael Stith is a singer/songwriter and multi-instrumentalist who released his first album Heavy Ghost in 2009 on the Asthmatic Kitty label. He currently resides in Rochester, New York.

Stith comes from a musical family: his father was a college wind ensemble director and former church choir director; his grandfather is professor emeritus in the music department at Cornell University; his mother is a pianist; and his sisters sing opera and play piano and percussion.

Stith's involvement in the music industry began as graphic designer and visual artist for musicians on the Asthmatic Kitty Records label, art directing and designing for artists such as Sufjan Stevens, My Brightest Diamond, Castanets and Son Lux. Through working with these artists on their projects, Stith began to write and record his own music, for which he was signed by Asthmatic Kitty Records.

From 2016 to 2019, Stith worked in the design department at The Metropolitan Museum of Art in New York City. In 2020, he relocated to Rochester, New York, to focus on writing and building a private recording studio. He continues to create artwork for artists in the New York new classical scene through his design entity, Vermeerier. Notable works include the Grammy-nominated debut album by Roomful of Teeth, the Pulitzer Prize-winning Partita for 8 Voices by Caroline Shaw, and album covers for artists such as Glenn Kotche, Nadine Shah, JFDR, Tyshawn Sorey, Sarah Kirkland Snider, and Mary Halvorson.

== Music ==
His second studio album, Pigeonheart, produced by Ben Hillier (Blur, Elbow, Nadine Shah) was released on July 29, 2016, with positive reviews, including a score of 70 on Metacritic. Pigeonheart is characterized by the integration of modular synthesizers into Stith's choirs, pianos and acoustic instruments. The Guardian called it "brilliantly compelling".

Stith's third album, Fata Morgana, produced by Thomas Bartlett, was released April 14, 2023, by Historical Fiction Records.

== Artistry ==
In 2022, after releasing a 13-minute remake of R.E.M.'s hit single Man on the Moon, lead singer Michael Stipe compared DM's voice to PJ Harvey, Leonard Cohen, Nina Simone and Perfume Genius.

== Personal life ==
An interview by Wyndham Wallace for The Quietus spoke about his experience with writer's block and psychosomatic muteness and deafness. Stith speaks openly about struggling with mental health.
