= Lawson White =

Lawson White is an American audio engineer, record producer, and percussionist based in Brooklyn, New York, United States. He is also the founder and president of Good Child Music. Lawson White is a former member of So Percussion and Alarm Will Sound. He is a consistent collaborator with New Amsterdam Records and Cantaloupe Music, while his production work includes engineering William Brittelle's record, Television Landscape.
