= Shara Nova =

American musician

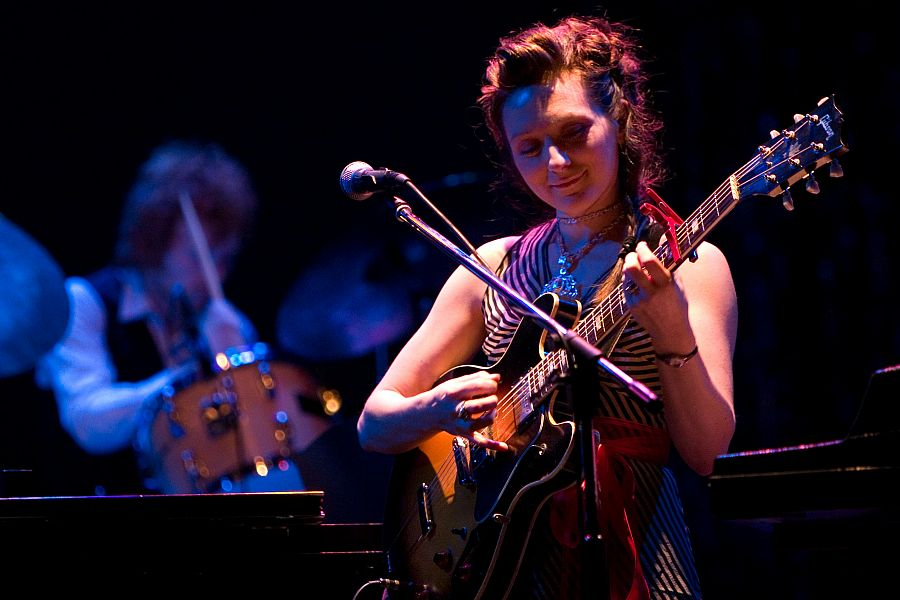
- Shara Nova performing with My Brightest Diamond at the Pabst Theater in Milwaukee in 2006.

Background information
- Born: April 22, 1974 (age 52); El Dorado, Arkansas
- Genres: indie rock, experimental
- Occupations: Singer, songwriter, producer, musician
- Instruments: Vocals, guitar, piano, ukulele, kalimba
- Years active: 1997–present
- Label: Asthmatic Kitty
- Website: mybrightestdiamond.com

Shara Nova (previously Worden) is the lead singer and songwriter for My Brightest Diamond. As a composer she is most recognized for her choral compositions and the baroque chamber opera "You Us We All". New music composers Sarah Kirkland Snider, David Lang, Steve Mackey and Bryce Dessner have composed pieces for Nova's voice. She has recorded as a guest vocalist with David Byrne, Laurie Anderson, The Decemberists, Sufjan Stevens, Jedi Mind Tricks, The Blind Boys of Alabama and Stateless as well as extensive collaborations with visual artists Matthew Ritchie and Matthew Barney. She was formerly the frontwoman of AwRY. On March 3, 2016, Shara legally changed her last name from Worden to Nova after divorcing her husband, to whom she had been married most of her adult life.

== Life ==
Nova was born in El Dorado, Arkansas. Her father was an accordion player and choir director and her mother was an organist for their Pentecostal church. Nova's uncle Donald Ryan, a classical and jazz pianist and arranger, taught her piano lessons as a child. Nova's family moved to many different states when she was a child, including significant time in Sapulpa, Oklahoma, and Ypsilanti, Michigan.

Nova graduated from the University of North Texas with a BA in vocal performance. After college, she lived in Moscow, Russia, for a year where she studied Russian and wrote songs, producing a self-released, limited edition EP, Session I. She moved to New York City, where she continued to study opera with Josephine Mongiardo. In 2009 Nova moved to Detroit, Michigan.

She married in 1997 and divorced in 2016, legally changing her name from Worden (her ex-husband's surname) to Nova. With her ex-husband she has one child, Constantine Jamesson Worden, born in 2010.

== Career ==
In 2001, Nova self-released two albums in collaboration with guitarist Shane Yarbrough under the moniker AwRY, The Orange Album and Quiet B Sides. A short tour followed the release of the albums, after which the band dissolved. In 2002 and 2003, Nova wrote music for Adam Rapp's play Trueblinka (directed by Simon Hammerstein) and subsequently for Hammerstein's production of Jean-Paul Sartre's Men Without Shadows (Morts sans sépulture). She began studying composition with Padma Newsome during this time. In 2004, she began touring as a part of Sufjan Stevens' band to support his album Michigan. In 2006, she released the album "Bring Me The Workhorse" on Asthmatic Kitty Records under the moniker My Brightest Diamond and was nominated for Female Artist of the Year in the PLUG Independent Music Awards. The My Brightest Diamond albums "A Thousand Shark's Teeth" (2008), "All Things Will Unwind" (2011), and "This Is My Hand" (2014) were also released on Asthmatic Kitty Records. Nova became a Kresge performing arts fellow in 2012.

=== Collaborations ===
Nova made significant contributions to the Sufjan Stevens' album Illinois in 2005, being the only backing vocalist to not be a part of the Illinoisemaker Choir, and toured with Stevens in support of the album in 2006. She made a guest appearance on the Jedi Mind Tricks album Servants in Heaven, Kings in Hell in 2006 and on the Vinnie Paz album Season of the Assassin in 2010. In 2008 Nova sang as a background vocalist for Laurie Anderson during five performances at The Rose Theater for the show Homeland. She performed guest vocals on "The Wanting Comes in Waves/Repaid" and "The Queen's Rebuke/The Crossing" from the 2009 album by The Decemberists, The Hazards of Love, singing vocals for the part of "The Queen". She also performed with The Decemberists on their "A Short Fazed Hovel Tour" along with Becky Stark from Lavender Diamond. Nova performed in and wrote the song "Nine" for Bryce and Aaron Dessner's multi-media performance The Long Count with texts and images by Matthew Ritchie. The Long Count was performed at the Krannert Center (2009), BAM (2009), the Holland Festival (2012) and the Barbican Centre (2012).

She performed vocals on Sufjan Stevens' 2010 album The Age of Adz, notably taking the lead during a section of "Impossible Soul". In January 2012 Nova performed the premiere of the song cycle Death Speaks by David Lang with pianist Nico Muhly, violinist Owen Pallett and guitarist Bryce Dessner. In 2015, Nova provided vocals for Sarah Kirkland Snider's Unremembered, and debuted her opera (co-written with Andrew Ondrejcak), You Us We All, in the United States.

In 2023–2024, Nova performed in Illinoise, the stage adaptation of Sufjan Stevens' Illinois; Nova performed as the "moth" Barsine, playing guitar and providing vocals.

=== Compositions ===
- Letters from Charles: for yMusic. Performed at the 92nd Street Y in Tribeca. Performed March 2010.
- A Paper, A Pen, A Note to a Friend: for yMusic. Released on Beautiful Mechanical (New Amsterdam Records 2011).
- A Whistle, A Tune, A Macaroon: for yMusic. Released on Beautiful Mechanical (New Amsterdam Records 2011).
- Skin and Bones: for yMusic
- From the Invisible to the Visible: for organist James McVinnie and violist Nadia Sirota commissioned by MusicNOW festival in March 2012. Released on the album Baroque (Bedroom Community 2013)
- The Pyramid Songs : 3 songs for The Brooklyn Youth Chorus, first performed by the choir at Crossing Borders Festival at BAM in New York, May 2012.
- Kings of Macedonia: music for brass quartet, drums and choir for Andrew Ondrejcak's play Kings of Macedonia. She also performed in the play as the character The Whore in May 2012 at The Kitchen.
- Phase 1 & III: music for marching band. Performed by The Detroit Party Marching Band (2013) for the opening ceremonies of Art X. Funded by The Kresge Foundation.
- The Pleiades: 5 songs for the Young New Yorkers' Chorus. Commissioned 2013.
- YOU, US, WE, ALL: Nova composed the music for a baroque opera designed and directed by Andrew Ondrejcak; performed in Antwerp, Belgium, May 2013.
- Titration: song cycle for acapella choir

== Discography ==
=== Solo albums ===
Year	Album artist name	Album title
1998	Shara	Word
2004	Shara Worden	Shara Worden Live at Schubas 11/18/2004

=== Collaborations and guest appearances ===
==== Credited as Shara Worden ====
===== Significant album contributions =====
Year	Artist	Album title	Vocals: lead/co-lead/backing
1997	Mingo Fishtrap	Succotash	Co-Lead
2003	Bogs Visionary Orchestra	Recession Special	Backing
2005	Sufjan Stevens	Illinois	Backing
2005/2006	Sufjan Stevens	Songs for Christmas, Vol. 3: Ding! Dong!	Backing
2006	Sufjan Stevens	The Avalanche	Backing
2008	Ready Fire Aim	This Changes Nothing	Backing
2009	Bifrost Arts	Come, O Spirit!	Lead
2009	DM Stith	Heavy Ghost	Backing
2009	Clare and The Reasons	Arrow	Backing
2010	Sufjan Stevens	Age Of Adz	Backing; co-lead ("Impossible Soul")
2010	Clogs	The Creatures In The Garden Of Lady Walton	Lead (select songs)
2010	Sarah Kirkland Snider	Penelope	Lead
2011	(Collaboration)	Letters to Distant Cities	Lead; spoken word
2013	David Lang	Death Speaks	Lead
2015	Sarah Kirkland Snider	Unremembered	Co-Lead
2016	Gabriel Kahane	The Fiction Issue	Co-Lead

===== Individual songs =====
Year	Artist	Album title	Song title	Vocals: Lead/co-lead/backing
2005	Todd Agnew	Grace Like Rain	"Kindness"	Backing
2005	Garden of Souls	Wake Up EP	"Runes (Diamond Mix)"	Co-Lead
2006	Jedi Mind Tricks	Servants In Heaven, Kings In Hell	"When All Light Dies"	Co-Lead
2006	Jedi Mind Tricks	Servants In Heaven, Kings In Hell	"Razorblade Salvation"	Co-Lead
2006	Pedestrian	Ghostly Life	"Overwhelmed"	Backing
2008	Pedestrian	sidegeist	"shape of a pocket"	Backing
2009	(Bifrost Arts Compilation Album)	Come O Spirit!	"Kyrie"	Co-Lead
2009	The Decemberists	The Hazards of Love	"The Wanting Comes in Waves/Repaid"	Co-Lead
2009	The Decemberists	The Hazards of Love	"The Queen's Rebuke"	Lead
2009	900X	Music For Lubbock, 1980	"Lands"	Lead
2010	Vinnie Paz	Season Of The Assassin	"Keep Moving' On"	Co-Lead
2010	David Byrne & Fatboy Slim	Here Lies Love	"Seven Years"	Co-Lead
2011	Owen Pallett	Export(demo)	"The Great Elsewhere"	Lead
2011	Prefuse 73	Only She Chapters	"The Only Hand to Hold"	Lead
2011	Uphill Racer	How It Feels To Find There's More	"Overfrail"	Lead
2011	Colin Stetson	New History Warfare 2: Judges	"Lord I Just Can't Keep From Crying Sometimes"	Lead
2011	Colin Stetson	New History Warfare 2: Judges	"Fear Of The Unknown And The Blazing Sun"	Lead
2011	Stateless	Matilda	"I'm On Fire"	Co-Lead
2011	Son Lux	We Are Rising	"Rebuild"	Backing
2011	The Revival Hour	"Hold Back/Run Away" (7" Single)	"Hold Back"	Backing
2012	S / S / S	Beak & Claw	"If This Is Real"	Backing (Chorus)
2012	Loop 2.4.3	American Dreamland	"Sakura (we must love)"	Co-Lead
2012	Loop 2.4.3	American Dreamland	I Knew (we shouldn't)	Backing
2012	The Universal Thump	All Things Must Pass	"Beware of Darkness"	Lead
2012	Recoil	Spirit of Talk Talk (Compilation)	"Dum Dum Girl"	Lead
2012	Mal'akh	Néctar	"Dimanche"	Lead
2013	Dog & Panther	Our Bodies	"I Want Love"	Backing
2014	Brooklyn Rider	The Brooklyn Rider Almanac	"Exit"	Lead
2014	Meshell Ndegeocello	Comet Come To Me	"Comet Come to Me"	Backing
2023	DM Stith	Fata Morgana	"In the Gloom"	Lead (Intro and Choir)

==== With AwRY ====
Year	Album title	Album type
2001	AwRY (a.k.a. "The Orange Album")	Full-length studio release
2001	Quiet B Sides	Full-length studio release
2003	Remix 1 (a.k.a. "The Remixes")	6-song remix EP

==== With My Brightest Diamond ====
Year	Album title	Album type
2006	Bring Me The Workhorse	Full-length studio release
2006	Disappear	EP (5 songs)
2007	Tear It Down	Full-length studio release / Remixes (initial iTunes release included 3 or 5 bonus songs, no longer available)
2008	Shark Demos	EP (6 songs, alternate versions)
2008	A Thousand Shark's Teeth	Full-length studio release
2008	From The Top Of The World	EP (4 songs)
2008	Inside A Boy	Single (4 songs)
2008	Shark Remixes Vol 1: Alfred Brown	Remix EP
2008	The Black Sessions	Limited-edition CD of live show at Studio 106, Paris
2009	Shark Remixes Vol 2: Son Lux	Remix EP
2009	Shark Remixes Vol 3: Roberto C. Lange	Remix EP
2010	Shark Remixes Vol 4: DM Stith	Remix EP
2010	Shark Remixes	Limited-edition signed compilation of all previous Shark Remix Volumes 1–4 (1,500 hand-numbered copies)
2011	All Things Will Unwind	Full-length studio release
2011	Be Brave	Single (3 song versions)
2012	I Have Never Loved Someone	7" single, alternate version, with "Bird on a Wire" B-side, limited edition 1,000 hand-numbered copies
2014	None More Than You	EP (5 songs)
2014	This Is My Hand	Full-length studio release; multiple vinyl versions, including limited-edition version with hand-made art slipcover (300 copies)
2015	I Had Grown Wild	EP (6 songs)
2018	Champagne	EP (5 songs)
2018	A Million and One	Full-length studio release

==== Collaborations and compilation contributions ====
Year	Artists (or publisher)	Album title	Song title	Additional information
2006	(Asthmatic Kitty Records)	Mews Too	"Riding Horses"	MBD recording of a song originally published by AwRY
2007	(Stereogum)	OKX: A Tribute to OK Computer	"Lucky"	MBD remake of Radiohead song
2007	(family records)	Cross-Pollination: The Mixtape Vol. 1	"Hi, Remember Me?"	
2008	(Engine Room Recordings)	Guilt By Association Vol. 2	"Tainted Love"	MBD remake of Gloria Jones/Soft Cell song
2008	(Animal World)	I'll Stay 'Til After Christmas	"Nature Boy"	MBD remake of eden ahbez/Nat King Cole song
2008	(Mojo Magazine)	The White Album Recovered No. 2	"Everybody's Got Something to Hide Except Me and My Monkey"	MBD remake of Beatles song
2009	(4AD Records)	Dark Was The Night	"Feeling Good"	MBD remake of Nina Simone song
2009	(Biggest Label Ever)	(released as single, digital download)	"The Honey Bee"	MBD contribution to support the Invisible Children charity
2010	My Brightest Diamond/Dayna Kurtz	"Gone Away"/"Postcards From Downtown"	"Postcards From Downtown"	Split single, each artist covers a song from the other; 7" release limited to 1,000 numbered copies
2011	Liz Janes	Time & Space	"Bitty Thing"	Shara Worden vocals, credited as My Brightest Diamond
2012	(Mojo Magazine)	The Songs of Leonard Cohen Covered	"Bird On A Wire"	MBD remake of Leonard Cohen song, with Marc Ribot
2022	Rachel Grimes, Angélica Negrón, Shara Nova, Caroline Shaw, Sarah Kirkland Snider, A Far Cry	The Blue Hour	all	A song cycle written collaboratively by five female composers, lyrics excerpted from the poem “On Earth” from the book Blue Hour by Carolyn Forché
