= Night Reign =

Studio album by Arooj Aftab
- Released: May 31, 2024
- Genres: Pakistani folk music; bebop jazz
- Length: 48:43
- Languages: Urdu, English
- Label: Verve
- Producer: Arooj Aftab

Arooj Aftab chronology
Love in Exile (with Vijay Iyer and Shahzad Ismaily) (2023)	Night Reign (2024)

Singles from Night Reign
- 1. "Raat Ki Rani" Released: April 18, 2024; 2. "Whiskey" Released: May 7, 2024

Night Reign is the fourth studio album by Pakistani singer and composer Arooj Aftab, released on May 31, 2024, by Verve Records. It was preceded by two singles, "Raat Ki Rani" and "Whiskey", with the former receiving a music video directed by Tessa Thompson.

Originally conceived as an album centering the Urdu-language poetry of Mah Laqa Bai Chanda, Night Reign has two songs based on Bai's words, as well and Urdu and English lyrics, some original and others based on other poets. The album features contributions from Gyan Riley, Kaki King, Maeve Gilchrist, Jamey Haddad, and Petros Klampanis, as well as guest musicians including Vijay Iyer, Shahzad Ismaily, Moor Mother, Elvis Costello, and Thompson's father Chocolate Genius, Inc.

The album consists of Pakistani folk music and bebop jazz, and centers thematically on darkness and the nighttime. It was received positively by critics who called the album experimental and said it deepened and expanded Aftab's sound. It was nominated twice at the 67th Annual Grammy Awards.

== Background ==
Night Reign follows Aftab's breakthrough album, 2021's Vulture Prince, for which she became the first Pakistani Grammy winner, got a song placed on Barack Obama's 2021 summer playlist, and signed to Verve Records. With all the excitement around the album, Aftab grew worried about following it up with her next album which "need[ed] to be better, or at least the same... or at least it really needs to not suck. You know, when you have a record that people really love, you're kind of fucked, because the next one has to be equally good or better. And that's really scary. My mind was preoccupied with how to take the sound further." Her original plans for the follow-up were an album centering the poetry of Mah Laqa Bai Chanda, the first female Urdu poet to publish a collection of her own work, whose poetry had not been set to music before, but the challenge stopped feeling creatively stimulating, so she abandoned it and kept two songs from it, "Na Gul" and "Saaqi".

== Writing and recording ==
Aftab brought a host of collaborators in for the record, including harpist Maeve Gilchrist, bassist Petros Klampanis, poet Moor Mother for a guest verse on "Bolo Na", and Elvis Costello playing the Wurlitzer on "Last Night Reprise". Costello previously called Vulture Prince one of his cultural highlights of 2021. Several songs also include work from percussionist Jamey Haddad, with Aftab bringing him in to help those songs have more groove. The album also sees Aftab embracing the piano, her least favorite instrument which she calls "so fucking corny", after having toured with pianist Vijay Iyer for their collaborative album Love in Exile.

The song "Last Night Reprise" is a revamp of the Vulture Prince song "Last Night". The new version originated on tour for Vulture Prince, where the band couldn't play "Last Night" in its original reggae style because they didn't have a drum kit. Klampanis wrote a new bassline which became the basis for the new version. Aftab compared it to the alternate versions of "Baghon Main" on Vulture Prince and the album before it, Bird Underwater, and said she would keep doing that on future albums.

Aftab started writing "Bolo Na" in high school, inspired by teenage heartbreak and angst, but shelved it because she found it too cheesy. She returned to the song with new lyrics written by herself and Moor Mother, focusing on the establishment. Aftab said that while Night Reign mainly focuses on the "sassy, fun" side of her personality and sees her "talking about whiskey and queens", she didn't want to ignore darker aspects of the world, saying it would be tone deaf and dishonest to do so. The album also features a rendition of the jazz standard "Autumn Leaves".

== Release ==
The album was announced on April 18, 2024, with a release date set for May 31, by Verve Records. With the announcement came the lead single, "Raat Ki Rani", which Aftab said was about "a person whose allure, magnetism, and charisma floats through a beautiful evening garden party." It was named after cestrum nocturnum, a flowering plant also known as night-blooming jasmine, which is known in Urdu as "raat ki rani", meaning "queen of the night".

Aftab first came up with the melody and hook for the song in a hotel room, but wasn't sure where to take the song beyond that. After consulting two Urdu-speaking writer friends who also had no ideas, Aftab settled with what she had, saying "Well, maybe it doesn't have to go anywhere. It's like what Nile Rodgers says — we all just want to get to the hook, so let's get to the hook. The song is just the hook." The song centers the piano, and marks Aftab's first use of Auto-Tune in her music. Aftab said she asked her mixing engineer to "put, like, T-Pain amounts of Auto-Tune on this and let's see how it sounds?", and says the two were "'horrified' at how much they liked it."

"Raat Ki Rani" came with a music video directed by actor Tessa Thompson, her directorial debut, and produced by Kishori Rajan, the head of Thompson's production company Viva Maude. The video features two women either falling in love or "starring in a Lynchian perfume commercial." Per Thompson, the video is "about the fantasies we have sometimes about people we encounter. It's about the way we come to life in dark spaces. It's about how intoxicating something in bloom can be. I don't want to say much more because I am curious what people see in it. But it is also an homage to some films I am deeply influenced by." Thompson's father, Marc Anthony Thompson, contributed to the album under the alias Chocolate Genius, Inc.

The second single, "Whiskey", was released on May 7. It features contributions from Kaki King and Gyan Riley on guitars, Maeve Gilchrist on harp, Linda May Han Oh on bass, Jamey Haddad on percussion, and TimaLikesMusic on synthesizer and piano. Aftab said the song was "about being out at night with someone you like, but the evening gets a little carried away. My friend has had too much, now I am tired, and I need to figure out how to get us both home. But overall somehow the night and the interaction is still pretty cute."

== Live ==
With the announcement of the album, Aftab also announced tour dates for June 2024 through January 2025 in Europe and the United States, including six shows in September and October supporting Khruangbin. In May, Aftab was announced as one of the curators for the Dutch music festival Le Guess Who?, set for November 7–10. Aftab's lineup will include performances by herself, her father Aftab Sr., Aja Monet, Dina El Wedidi, Meshell Ndegeocello, Noura Mint Seymali, and Zsela.

== Style and themes ==
The album has been described as Pakistani folk music colliding with American bebop jazz. The album's lyrics are in both Urdu and English.

Darkness and nighttime are a recurring theme in the album. Critics said that the album sees Aftab "reclaim[ing] darkness, positioning the night as a time of mischief and enchantment", and noted that Aftab has called nighttime her "biggest source of inspiration". Aftab, asked in an interview about the presence of the moon, said "The moon is such a big character of the night, and we've talked about the moon so much in poetry and music and film, so I wanted to shift the focus to the major protagonist, the night. The moon is this powerful thing that reflects the light of the day. It ties us into the day. It makes us feel that we're not ignoring the day. We're not saying the day is less. The moon is there in the album through 'Last Night', but the night is actually the protagonist in question here. Not me, not my lover, not the moon: the night itself." Aftab also noted a connection with Mah Laqa Bai Chanda and the 16th-century ruler Chand Bibi, given that "Chand" translates to "moon" and "Chand Bibi" means "Moon Lady".

== Reception ==
Night Reign ratings
Aggregate scores
Source	Rating
AnyDecentMusic?	8.4/10
Metacritic	89/100
Review scores
Source	Rating
AllMusic	4/5 stars
Far Out	4/5 stars
The Guardian	4/5 stars
Mojo	4/5 stars
Pitchfork	8.3/10
Spin	A−
Uncut	9/10

According to the review aggregator Metacritic, Night Reign received "universal acclaim" based on a weighted average score of 89 out of 100 from 12 critic scores.

The Guardian's Ammar Kalia said Night Reign was "one of [Aftab's] most spirited and experimental records to date, aiming to embody the nocturnal setting that provides the inspiration for her music", and called it "a welcome step forward". The Wall Street Journal's Mark Richardson said the album "expands [Aftab's] sound in important ways while remaining true to the path she's traveled so far."

Far Out's Tom Taylor wrote that "the element that proves most captivating throughout is the hushed vocals of Aftab. There is a stirring range to her serene crooning cadence that makes for something that is both gentle yet full of feeling to an almost eerie degree. That alluring mix renders Night Reign an enticing darkness to wade into." Spin's Vrinda Jagota said that, as opposed to Vulture Prince's showcase of restraint, grief, and yearning, Night Reign's "songs carry the unbridled excitement of a child equipped with a marker and an endless expanse of white wall. Full of jagged left turns and golden flourishes, they are unpredictable and dynamic. The joy they relay is less a sense of contentment than curiosity and willingness to embrace whatever could be." Pitchfork's Andy Cush called the album "wondrous" and said it "deepens the sound of her boundless folk-jazz style. Its gestures are bold, romantic, and often unforgettable."

=== Awards and nominations ===
Night Reign awards and nominations
Year	Organisation	Award	Recipient	Status	Ref.
2025	Grammy Awards	Best Global Music Performance	"Raat Ki Rani"	Nominated	
2025	Grammy Awards	Best Alternative Jazz Album	Night Reign	Nominated	

=== Year-end lists ===
Select year-end rankings for Night Reign
Publication/critic	Rank	Ref.
Consequence	47	
Mojo	39	
Pitchfork	17	
Time Out	17	
Uncut	4	

== Track listing ==
All music is composed by Arooj Aftab except where noted.

Night Reign track listing
No.	Title	Lyrics	Music	Length
1.	"Aey Nehin"	Yasra Rizvi		5:45
2.	"Na Gul"	Mah Laqa Bai Chanda		5:29
3.	"Autumn Leaves" (featuring James Francies)	Jacques Prévert; Johnny Mercer	Joseph Kosma	4:46
4.	"Bolo Na" (featuring Moor Mother and Joel Ross)	Aftab; Camae Ayewa		6:14
5.	"Saaqi" (featuring Vijay Iyer)	Mah Laqa Bai Chanda		6:46
6.	"Last Night (Reprise)" (featuring Cautious Clay, Kaki King, and Maeve Gilchrist)	Rumi		5:07
7.	"Raat Ki Rani"	Aftab		5:13
8.	"Whiskey"	Aftab		5:07
9.	"Zameen" (featuring Chocolate Genius, Inc.)	Shamim Jaipuri	Aftab; Begum Akhtar; Marc Anthony Thompson	4:16
Total length:				48:43

== Personnel ==
=== Musicians ===
- Arooj Aftab – vocals, sequencer (3, 4), synthesizer (3)
- Gyan Riley – electric guitar (1, 5, 8)
- Kaki King – guitar (1, 2, 6, 8)
- Maeve Gilchrist – harp (1, 2, 6–8)
- Jamey Haddad – percussion (1, 7, 8)
- Petros Klampanis – upright bass (1, 2, 5–7), piano (7)
- Nadje Noordhuis – flugelhorn (2, 4)
- James Francies – synthesizer (3), Rhodes piano (3)
- Linda May Han Oh – upright bass (3, 8)
- Moor Mother – vocals (4)
- Joel Ross – vibraphone (4)
- Shahzad Ismaily – bass (4), synthesizer (7)
- Huda Asfoura – oud (4)
- Vijay Iyer – piano (5)
- Darian Donovan Thomas – violin (5)
- Cautious Clay – flute (6)
- Elvis Costello – Wurlitzer electronic piano (6)
- Heather Ewer – tuba (7)
- Keita Ogawa – percussion (7)
- TimaLikesMusic – piano (8), synthesizer (8)
- Chocolate Genius, Inc. – bass (9), piano (9), strings (9), synthesizer (9)

=== Technical ===
- Arooj Aftab – producer, arranger
- Damon Whittemore – recording engineer (1, 2, 5–9)
- Joshua Valleau – mixing engineer, recording engineer (3, 4)
- Daddy Kev – mastering engineer
- Maeve Gilchrist – arranger (1, 2, 6, 7)
- Petros Klampanis – arranger (1, 2, 6, 7)
- Kaki King – arranger (1)
- James Francies – arranger (3)
- Chocolate Genius, Inc. – producer (9), mixing engineer (9), arranger (9)

== Charts ==
Chart performance for Night Reign
Chart (2024)	Peak position
Belgian Albums (Ultratop Flanders)	36
Scottish Albums (Official Charts)	44
UK Album Downloads (Official Charts)	35
