= Vulture Prince =

Studio album by Arooj Aftab
- Released: April 23, 2021
- Length: 46:34
- Label: New Amsterdam
- Producer: Arooj Aftab

Arooj Aftab chronology
Siren Islands (2018)	Vulture Prince (2021)	Love in Exile (with Vijay Iyer and Shahzad Ismaily) (2023)

Vulture Prince is the third album by Pakistani musician Arooj Aftab, released by New Amsterdam Records on April 23, 2021. Thematically, the album discusses stories of people, relationships, and lost moments and is dedicated to the memory of her younger brother, Maher. "Mohabbat" won the Best Global Music Performance at the 64th Annual Grammy Awards.

== Critical reception ==
Professional ratings
Review scores
Source	Rating
Mojo	4/5 stars
Pitchfork	8.2/10
Uncut	9/10

Bhanuj Kappal of Pitchfork called the album a "heartbreaking, exquisite document of the journey from grief to acceptance."

Vulture Prince was named the best album of 2021 by Netherlands newspaper de Volkskrant, topping their year-end list. Brenna Ehrlich ranked the album sixth on Rolling Stone's "Best Music of 2021" staff list. It was ranked number twenty by The Guardian on their list of the "50 best albums of 2021", and Laura Snapes named Aftab "[t]he year's biggest musical revelation". While Vulture Prince did not rank on the Los Angeles Times' top ten "Best Albums of 2021", it was, however, included on their "15 deserving albums" list.

Barack Obama selected the song "Mohabbat" from this album as one of his summer playlist favorites for 2021. "Mohabbat" was called one of the best songs of 2021 by Time and The New York Times. "Mohabbat" won the Best Global Music Performance at the 64th Annual Grammy Awards.

== Track listing ==
All tracks are written by Arooj Aftab, except where noted.

No.	Title	Lyrics	Length
1.	"Baghon Main" (featuring Darian Donovan Thomas)		6:44
2.	"Diya Hai" (featuring Badi Assad)		5:40
3.	"Inayaat"		7:47
4.	"Last Night"		5:58
5.	"Mohabbat"	Hafeez Hoshiarpuri	7:42
6.	"Saans Lo"	Annie Ali Khan	7:31
7.	"Suroor"		5:12
Total length:			46:34

== Personnel ==
- Arooj Aftab – songwriting, vocals, production
- Maeve Gilchrist – harp (1, 3, 5)
- Darian Donovan Thomas – violin (1, 3)
- Petros Klampanis – double bass (1), piano (3), double bass (3)
- Badi Assad - guitar (2)
- Magda Giannikou – arrangement (2)
- Juliette Jones – strings arrangement (2)
- Rootstock Republic – strings (2)
  - Juliette Jones – violin (2)
  - Lady Jess – violin (2)
  - Jarvis Benson – viola (2)
  - Malcolm Parson – cello (2)
- Nadje Noordhuis – flugelhorn (3, 5)
- Bhrigu Sahni – guitar (4)
- Mario Carrillio – double bass (4)
- Jörn Bielfeldt – drums (4)
- Jamey Haddad – percussion (5)
- Gyan Riley – guitar (5)
- Shahzad Ismaily – synth (5, 6)
- Kenji Herbert – guitar (6)
- Annie Ali Khan – lyrics (6)
- Joshua Valleau – mixing, engineering
- Damon Whittemore – mastering
- Vishesh Sharma – photography
- Anum Awan – photo editing
- Micah Blacklight – album artwork
- Vandana Jain – art direction, design

== Charts ==
Chart performance for Vulture Prince
Chart (2022)	Peak position
Belgian Albums (Ultratop Flanders)	24
Dutch Albums (Album Top 100)	54
Scottish Albums (Official Charts)	35
Swiss Albums (Schweizer Hitparade)	70
