= Mohabbat (song) =

Ghazal by Hafeez Hoshiarpuri

- by Hafeez Hoshiarpuri
- Original title: موحبّت
- Written: 1920s
- Language: Urdu

"Mohabbat" (Urdu: موحبّت transl. Love), also known as "Mohabbat Karne Waale Kum Na Hongey" (Urdu: موحبّت کرنے والے کم نہ ہونگے transl. There will be no shortage of lovers.), is an Urdu ghazal written by Hafeez Hoshiarpuri. The ghazal has been covered by numerous singers, including Mehdi Hassan, Iqbal Bano, Jagjit Singh, Papon, Farida Khanum, and Arooj Aftab. Aftab's rendition won the Grammy Award for Best Global Music Performance at the 64th Annual Grammy Awards.

== Background ==
"Mohabbat" was written in the 1920s by Hafeez Hoshiarpuri, a poet born in 1912 in Hoshiarpur, Punjab, British India and died in 1973 in Karachi, Pakistan. The ghazal is based on the Hindustani classical Music raga Khamaj.

== Music ==
"Mohabbat"'s have been interpreted in multiple ways. The lyrics describe the pain of separation from a loved one. Musician Arooj Aftab stated that the ghazal "could be a love song, breakup song, a political statement, a nostalgic memory."

== Versions ==
The ghazal has been covered by numerous singers, including Mehdi Hassan, Iqbal Bano, Jagjit Singh, Papon, Farida Khanum, and Arooj Aftab. The ghazal was initially popularized by Hassan's rendition. Aftab's rendition won the Grammy Award for Best Global Music Performance at the 64th Annual Grammy Awards.

Renditions of the ghazal commonly use instruments such as the harmonium and tabla. Taan, a vocal modulation in which a singer quickly shifts between notes while climbing up a scale, is a common vocal technique used in renditions of the ghazal.

=== Arooj Aftab version ===
Arooj Aftab released a version of the ghazal on March 16, 2021 as the lead single to her album, Vulture Prince. Aftab sings three couplets of the ghazal using "vocal jazz techniques." The recording utilizes a more stripped back, minimalist instrumental, beginning with a guitar and harp melody. Synthesizers and flugelhorn are introduced in later sections of the ghazal. On the track, Shahzad Ismaily plays the synthesizer, Gyan Riley plays the guitar, Nadje Noordhuis plays the flugelhorn, Maeve Gilchrist plays the harp, and Jamey Haddad plays percussion. Aftab had performed live renditions of the ghazal since 2011 but recorded a studio version following the death of her brother in 2018.

==== Reception ====
Pitchfork listed it as a Best New Track, writing that it encapsulates "calmness, peace, patience, simplicity. And then sadness, longing, wandering, searching, openness, oneness." Time selected it as one of the Best Songs of 2021, calling it "blissful and enveloping" and a standout of Vulture Prince. Kitty Empire of The Observer described the song as "home to some of Aftab’s most elegiac intonations." Uncut's Sam Richards described the song as "based on traditional Pakistani songs of yearning, placed in a radical new context that only enhances their power." Band Baji of Dawn described the song as "a beautiful, minimalist, unplugged track that is haunting both for its ambient sound as well as Arooj’s elongated vocalisations of longing and separation." Barack Obama selected the song for his 2021 summer playlist. Aftab's rendition won the Grammy Award for Best Global Music Performance at the 64th Annual Grammy Awards.

"Mohabbat"

Single by Arooj Aftab

from the album Vulture Prince
- Released: March 16, 2021
- Length: 7:42
- Label: New Amsterdam
- Producers: Shahzad Ismaily; Gyan Riley; Nadje Noordhuis; Maeve Gilchrist; Jamey Haddad
