= Love in Exile (Arooj Aftab, Vijay Iyer, and Shahzad Ismaily album) =

Studio album by Arooj Aftab, Vijay Iyer, and Shahzad Ismaily
- Released: March 24, 2023
- Length: 75:12
- Language: Urdu
- Label: Verve
- Producers: Arooj Aftab; Vijay Iyer; Shahzad Ismaily

Arooj Aftab chronology
Vulture Prince (2021)	Love in Exile (2023)	Night Reign (2024)

Vijay Iyer chronology
A Love Sonnet for Billie Holiday (2021)	Love in Exile (2023)	Compassion (2024)

Shahzad Ismaily chronology
Visitations (2020)	Love in Exile (2023)	Dosh, Ismaily, Young (2023)

Singles from Love in Exile
- 1. "To Remain/To Return" Released: February 23, 2023

Love in Exile is an album by Pakistani singer Arooj Aftab, Indian-American pianist Vijay Iyer, and multi-instrumentalist Shahzad Ismaily, released on March 24, 2023, by Verve Records. It is the trio's first album together, recorded in a studio in New York. It was received positively by critics. At the 66th Annual Grammy Awards, the album was nominated for Best Alternative Jazz Album and "Shadow Forces" was nominated for Best Global Music Performance.

== Background and recording ==
Aftab, Iyer, and Ismaily first performed live together in New York in 2018, a performance in which Pitchfork's Philip Sherburne said it "became unclear who was leading whom, or even where one musician ended and the next began". The trio came together in a studio in New York to record their first album together. They recorded live, taking the same positions as that live performance: Aftab singing in Urdu, Iyer playing piano and electronics, and Ismaily playing electric bass and Moog synthesizer.

== Release ==
On February 23, 2023, the trio announced the album and released its lead single, "To Remain/To Return". Iyer described the song as "reveal[ing] not just the melody but the birth of a song. I hear Shahzad and myself establishing these haunted cycles, then slowly and delicately transforming them, as Arooj glides across like a dark moon." Sherburne called the track "a small miracle of telepathy occurring across nine spellbinding minutes."

The album was released on March 24, 2023, by Verve Records.

== Reception ==
Love in Exile ratings
Aggregate scores
Source	Rating
Metacritic	85/100
Review scores
Source	Rating
The Guardian	4/5 stars
Mojo	4/5 stars
Pitchfork	8.5/10
Uncut	8/10

According to the review aggregator Metacritic, Love in Exile received "universal acclaim" based on a weighted average score of 85 out of 100 from 5 critic scores. Pitchfork called the album the best new music of the week.

=== Awards and nominations ===
Love in Exile awards and nominations
Year	Organisation	Award	Work	Status	Ref.
2024	Grammy Awards	Best Alternative Jazz Album	Love in Exile	Nominated	
2024	Grammy Awards	Best Global Music Performance	"Shadow Forces"	Nominated	

=== Year-end lists ===
Love in Exile on year-end lists
Publication	#	Ref.
Aquarium Drunkard	—N/a	
Beats Per Minute	35	
BrooklynVegan (Jazz Albums)	—N/a	
Consequence	34	
Mojo	16	
The New York Times (Jon Pareles)	10	
Pitchfork	25	
Slate	—N/a	
Treble	49	
Uncut	33	

== Track listing ==
All tracks are written by Arooj Aftab, Vijay Iyer, and Shahzad Ismaily.

Love in Exile track listing
No.	Title	Length
1.	"To Remain/To Return"	9:17
2.	"Haseen Thi"	12:08
3.	"Shadow Forces"	14:04
4.	"Sajni"	8:07
5.	"Eyes of the Endless"	14:40
6.	"Sharabi"	13:36
7.	"To Remain/To Return" (Excerpt)	3:20
Total length:		75:12

== Personnel ==
- Arooj Aftab – producer, arranger, vocals
- Vijay Iyer – producer, arranger, piano (1, 3, 4, 6, 7), Rhodes piano (2, 5, 6), electroacoustic realization (1, 5–7)
- Shahzad Ismaily – producer, arranger, electric bass, Moog synthesizer
- Damon Whittemore – recording engineer, mixing engineer
- Matt Colton – mastering engineer
