= Maeve Gilchrist =

Scottish harpist and composer

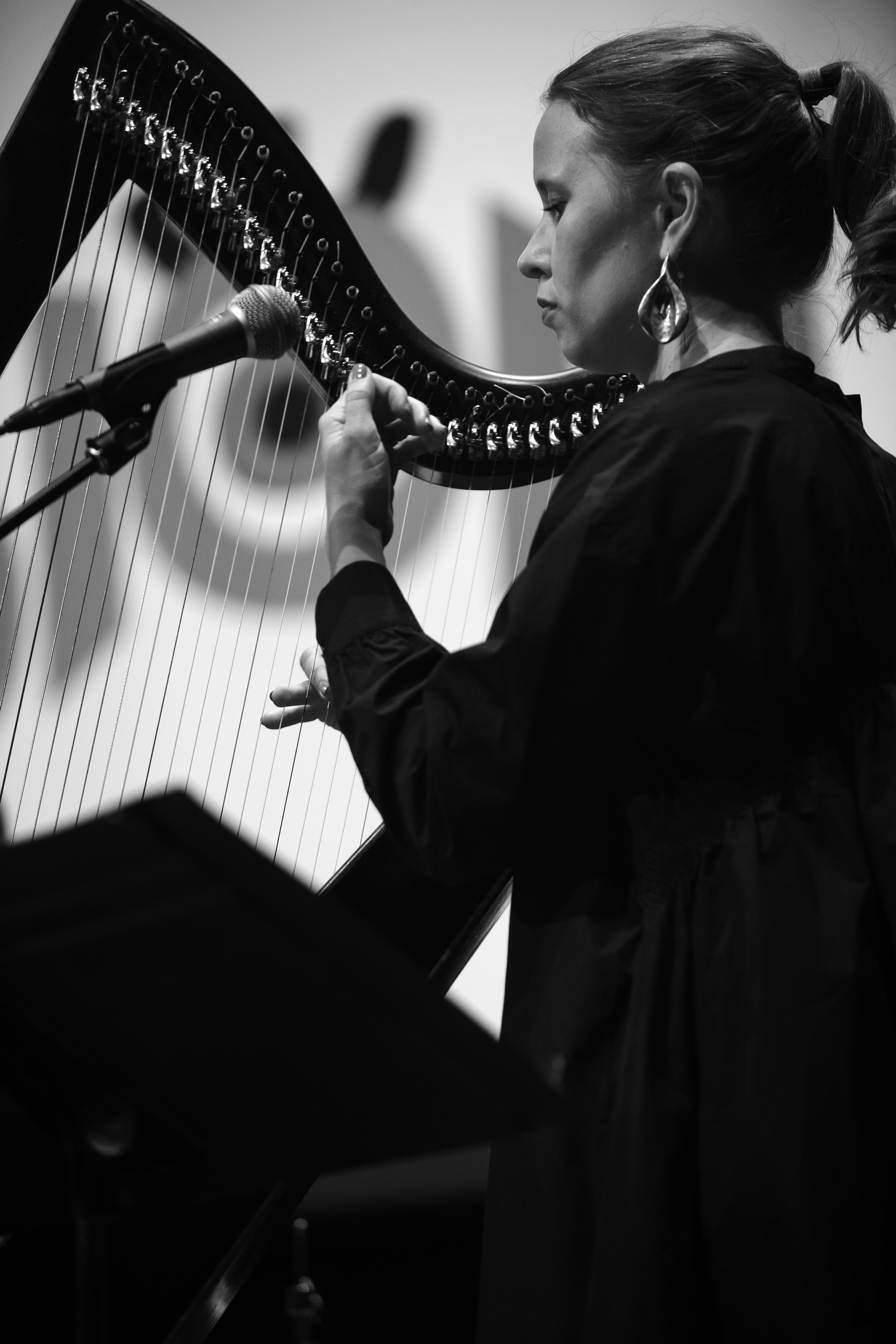
- Maeve Gilchrist, Arts for Art - Vision Festival 2024. Photo by Marek Lazarski

Background information
- Born: Scotland
- Occupations: Musician, composer, teacher
- Instrument: Celtic harp

Maeve Gilchrist is a Scottish harpist and composer currently living in New York City. She is known for combining traditional folk music, jazz, improvisation, and experimentation.

== Early life and education ==
Gilchrist grew up in Edinburgh, where she was immersed in folk music due to her Scottish father and Irish mother, who were both musicians and frequently hosted music sessions in their home. Two of her mother's sisters are also professional harpists in Ireland. Around the age of ten, Gilchrist began studying classical piano at the City of Edinburgh Music School. Her studies broadened to include jazz and the harp. At age 17, she moved to the United States to study at the Berklee College of Music in Boston, where she received a full scholarship. She "met musicians from all over the world there, which I found so exciting – Colombian and Venezuelan musicians, for example, who used the harp in completely different ways."

== Career ==
In 2019, The Irish Times called Gilchrist "the epitome of a new generation of adventurous harpers, pushing the boundaries of her chosen instrument so that it feels both ancient and utterly contemporary." Gilchrist herself has said, "The harp comes with lots of stereotypes, and I want to turn those on their heads." She has composed orchestral music featuring the harp and symphony orchestras. She has been a teacher and a visiting artist at her alma mater, the Berklee College of Music. She has recorded with artists including My Brightest Diamond, been a member of the group The Furies, and played shows in a duo with Sam Amidon. She has also collaborated with Yo-Yo Ma, Esperanza Spalding, and the string quartet Brooklyn Rider. Gilchrist has also performed with percussive dancer Nic Gareiss, and the two of them play together in a foursome called DuoDuo, which also includes cellist Natalie Haas and guitarist Yann Falquet.

On cellist Okkyung Lee's 2020 album Yeo-Neun, Gilchrist played harp in a quartet led by Lee and also featuring Jacob Sacks on piano and Elvynd Opsvik on bass. Writing for Pitchfork, reviewer Jonathan Williger praised the album, saying the ensemble "operates with eloquence and precision."

Gilchrist's 2020 album, The Harpweaver, was inspired by the poem "The Ballad of the Harp-Weaver" by Edna St. Vincent Millay.

Gilchrist played harp in the album Vulture Prince by Arooj Aftab where one of the song won the Best Global Music Performance at the 64th Annual Grammy Awards in 2021.

== Discography ==
- The Ostinato Project (2013)
- Vignette (Maeve Gilchrist & Viktor Krauss) (2017)
- The Harpweaver (2020)
