= Call Me Sylvia =

Studio album by Low Cut Connie
- Released: September 25, 2012
- Genre: Rock and roll
- Label: Self-released

Low Cut Connie chronology
Get Out the Lotion (2011)	Call Me Sylvia (2012)	Hi Honey (2015)

Call Me Sylvia is the second album by rock and roll band Low Cut Connie, released on September 25, 2012. The band has described it as their first album recorded with the knowledge that they were really a band, whereas Get Out the Lotion, their debut album, was recorded under more informal circumstances. The song "Boozophilia" was released as a single from the album, accompanied by a music video which was filmed at Ray's Happy Birthday Bar in Philadelphia. In August 2015, "Boozophilia" was featured on Barack Obama's summer playlist.

== Critical reception ==
Call Me Sylvia received generally favorable reviews from critics; according to Metacritic, which aggregates reviews by well-known critics, the album has a score of 80/100. It was described as "pathologically fun" by Stacey Anderson. Similarly, Ken Tucker wrote that the album was "as raucous as [Low Cut Connie's] debut, though it's a bit more self-conscious." Brent Wells wrote that Call Me Sylvia was "an exercise created by a pack of blue-collar dudes who relish throwback grooves and the art of clever sarcasm." "Boozophilia" was ranked as the 31st best song of 2012 by Rolling Stone, and was praised in Paste for its "rollicking piano lines, warm guitar shuffles, and shout-along vocals."

Professional ratings
Aggregate scores
Source	Rating
Metacritic	(80%)
Review scores
Source	Rating
AllMusic	4/5 stars
American Songwriter	4/5 stars
Robert Christgau	(A−)
PopMatters	(7/10)
Rolling Stone	3.5/5 stars

== Track listing ==
1. Say Yes
2. Boozophilia
3. Donʼt Cry Baby Blue
4. Desperation
5. Pity Party
6. Brand New Cadillac
7. Stay Alive If You Can
8. Call Me Sylvia
9. Sister Mary
10. Cleveland
11. Youʼve Got Everything
12. Scoliosis In Secaucus
13. Share Your Name
14. (No More) Wet T-shirt Contests
15. Dreams Donʼt Come True
