= Hi Honey (album) =

Studio album by Low Cut Connie
- Released: April 21, 2015
- Studio: Daptone
- Genre: Rock and roll
- Length: 38:35
- Label: Contender
- Producer: Thomas Brenneck

Low Cut Connie chronology
Call Me Sylvia (2012)	Hi Honey (2015)	Dirty Pictures (Part 1) (2017)

Singles from Hi Honey
- 1. "Shake It Little Tina" Released: 2015

Hi Honey is the third studio album by American rock and roll band Low Cut Connie. It was released on April 21, 2015 on Contender Records. Guests who appear on the album include Merrill Garbus of Tune-Yards, as well as Dean Ween and Greg Cartwright.

== Recording ==
Hi Honey was recorded at a small space owned by Daptone Records and produced by Thomas Brenneck, who is known for his work with Sharon Jones & The Dap-Kings.

== Critical reception ==
Professional ratings
Aggregate scores
Source	Rating
Metacritic	80/100
Review scores
Source	Rating
AllMusic	4/5 stars
The Independent	4/5 stars
Robert Christgau	(2-star Honorable Mention)
Rolling Stone	3.5/5 stars

Dave Tomar wrote in the Huffington Post that Hi Honey "brims with something more than just the wounded abandon that distinguished previous recordings" and said that it "borrows furiously and confidently from history to deliver an immediate blast of booty-shaking brilliance." Stephen Thomas Erlewine, of AllMusic, awarded the album four out of five stars and said that "the nifty thing about Hi Honey is how it's cleverly produced to replicate the kinetic sensation of hearing a stack of 45s being spun through an old jukebox." Eric Schuman, writing for Magnet, named the album "essential new music" in May 2015 and said that it was "both retro-minded and forward-thinking."

== Track listing ==
1. "Who the Hell Is Tina?" – 0:59
2. "Shake It Little Tina" – 3:22
3. "Diane (Don't Point that Thing at Me)" – 2:24
4. "Back in School" – 2:06
5. "Me n Annie" – 3:24
6. "Taste So Good" – 3:25
7. "Dickie's Bringin Me Down" – 3:25
8. "Danny's Outta Money" – 4:20
9. "Little Queen of New Orleans" – 3:56
10. "Dumb Boy" – 2:22
11. "The Royal Screw" – 2:32
12. "Somewhere Along the Avenue" – 2:18
13. "Both My Knees" – 4:06

== Personnel ==
- Thomas Brenneck – engineer, mixing, producer
- Greg Cartwright – guest artist
- Alecia Chakour – backing vocals
- Will Donnelly – group member
- Sabrina Ellis – backing vocals
- James Everhart – group member
- Dan Finnemore – composer, group member
- Merrill Garbus – guest artist
- Dave Guy – horn
- Roger Holcombe – featured artist
- Wondress Hutchinson – backing vocals
- Phil Knott – inside photo
- Huddie Ledbetter – composer
- Low Cut Connie – primary artist
- Kevin Nix – mastering
- Vinnie Pastore – guest artist
- Anders Petersen – cover photo
- Russell Saliba – featured artist
- Robert Schuler – featured artist
- Neal Sugarman – horn
- Jared Tankel – horn
- Aaron Tanner – art direction, design
- Dean Ween – guest artist
- Adam Weiner – composer, group member
- Saundra Williams – backing vocals
