= Yeo-Neun =

Studio album by Okkyung Lee
- Released: May 8, 2020
- Length: 39:36
- Label: Shelter Press
- Producer: Okkyung Lee

Okkyung Lee chronology
Speckled Stones and Dissonant Green Dots (2018)	Yeo-Neun (2020)

Yeo-Neun (Korean: 여는) is the eighth studio album by South Korean artist Okkyung Lee. It was released on May 8, 2020, by Shelter Press.

== Critical reception ==
Professional ratings
Aggregate scores
Source	Rating
Metacritic	84/100
Review scores
Source	Rating
Exclaim!	8/10
The Line of Best Fit	8/10
Mojo	4/5 stars
Pitchfork	8.0/10

Yeo-Neun was met with widespread acclaim reviews from critics. Tom Piekarski of Exclaim! reviewed it is "bound to stand as one of this year's best neoclassical releases." Malvika Padin of The Line of Best Fit described Yeo-Neun as "Beacon of contemporary experimental music". Jonathan Williger of Pitchfork said "She is an exceptionally expressive performer, able to conjure rapture as effectively as unrest."

== Track listing ==
All tracks written by Okkyung Lee.

No.	Title	Length
1.	"Here We Are (Once Again)"	6:09
2.	"The Yellow Porcelain Bird"	3:36
3.	"Another Old Story (옛날이야기)"	3:11
4.	"In Stardust (For Kang Kyung-ok)"	4:13
5.	"Eternally (미련없이)"	2:05
6.	"Uiro (Up and Up and Up)"	4:00
7.	"The Longest Morning"	4:44
8.	"One Bright Lazy Sunday Afternoon (You Whispered That Name)"	5:10
9.	"Facing Your Shadows"	3:58
10.	"Then, There (그때 그자리)"	2:30

== Personnel ==
Credits adapted from the liner notes of Yeo-Neun.

=== Musicians ===
- Maeve Gilchrist – harp
- Okkyung Lee – cello
- Eivind Opsvik – bass
- Jacob Sacks – piano
