= La Doña (artist) =

American musical artist

Cecilia Cassandra Peña-Govea, known by her stage name La Doña, is an American musical artist whose music combines Latin rhythms and San Francisco hip-hop.

== Career ==
In 2019, La Doña was one of 14 artists from around the world selected for the Foundry, a YouTube incubator known for launching a number of musical careers.

She released her Algo Nuevo album on March 12, 2020, with a planned national tour starting at SXSW and launch party in San Francisco, just as San Francisco and the United States went into lockdown because of the COVID-19 pandemic. Her launch party and tour were cancelled, which attracted attention from the media as she became an example of an artist whose career momentum was interrupted by COVID-19. Since then, she has had music played at San Francisco Giants games and performed at San Francisco's Outside Lands at Golden Gate Park.

Former president Barack Obama included La Doña's single "Penas con Pan" on his 2023 summer playlist.

== Style ==
La Doña's music combines influences from across Latin America, including Colombian cumbia, Cuban salsa, Mexican norteñas, and Puerto Rican reggaeton.
