= Get Out the Lotion =

Studio album by Low Cut Connie
- Released: January 1, 2011
- Recorded: August 2010 at Neil Duncan's studio in Gainesville, Florida
- Genre: Rock and roll, indie rock
- Length: 31:53
- Label: Self-released

Low Cut Connie chronology
Get Out the Lotion (2011)	Call Me Sylvia (2012)

Get Out the Lotion is the debut album by Philadelphia-based indie rock band Low Cut Connie. The band self-released the album on January 1, 2011, after debuting it on New Year's Eve at Philadelphia's Old Swedes' Church.

== Background and recording ==
The songs on the album were a combination of songs written by Low Cut Connie's two songwriters—Adam Weiner and Dan Finnemore—both of whom were already members of their own bands at the time. The album was recorded over a four-day period at the Gainesville, Florida studio of the band's guitarist Neil Duncan, who also engineered the album.

== Critical reception ==
Professional ratings
Review scores
Source	Rating
PopMatters	(8/10)
Rolling Stone	3.5/5 stars
NPR	(favorable)
Robert Christgau	(A−)

Several music critics, such as Ken Tucker and Robert Christgau, gave the album favorable reviews upon its release. Tucker, along with a reviewer writing for Blurt Magazine, also compared the album's music to Jerry Lee Lewis. Similarly, Guitar World described the album's music as "swampy, Fifties-inspired American rock and roll."

== Accolades ==
Get Out the Lotion was ranked as the 35th best album on Robert Christgau's "Dean's List" for 2011, and was also ranked #7 on Merrill Garbus' list of her 10 favorite albums of 2011. Ken Tucker also ranked it as his 7th favorite album of 2011.

== Track listing ==
1. The Cat & The Cream – 2:10
2. Rio – 4:12
3. Big Thighs, NJ – 3:13
4. Darlin' – 2:42
5. Full of Joy – 3:00
6. Johnny Cool Man – 2:36
7. Lover's Call – 2:34
8. Shit, Shower & Shave – 2:48
9. Show Your Face – 2:39
10. Right Here – 2:56
11. Waitin' for Mikey – 3:03
