= Low Cut Connie =

American rock and roll band

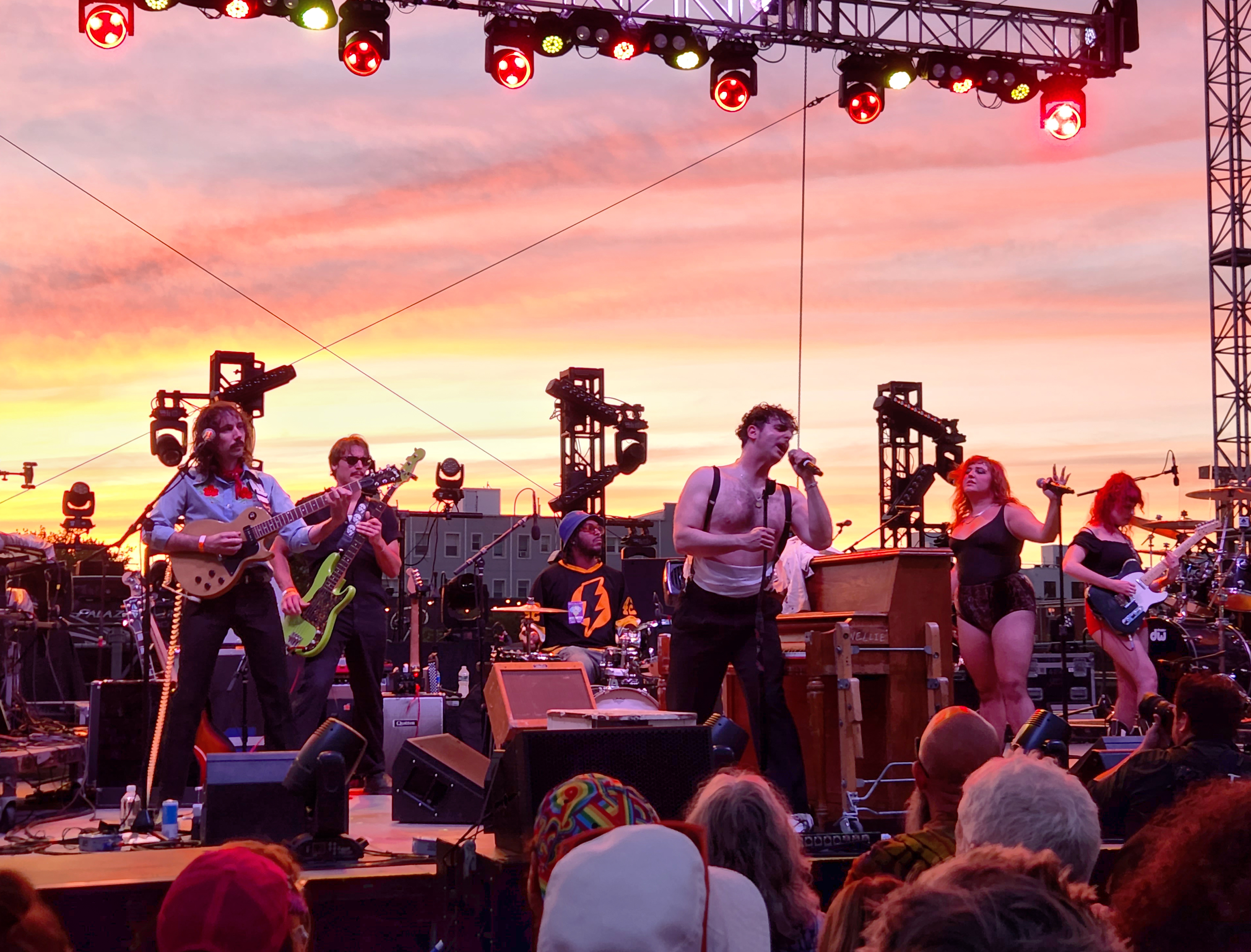
- Low Cut Connie at the Stone Pony Summer Stage in August 2025; from left to right: Rich Stanley, Nick Perri, Jarae Lewis, Adam Weiner, Amanda Bullwinkel, Kelsey Cork

Background information
- Origin: Philadelphia, Pennsylvania, U.S.
- Genre: Rock and roll
- Years active: 2010–present
- Label: Contender Records
- Members: Adam Weiner
- Website: lowcutconnie.com

Low Cut Connie is an American rock and roll band based in Philadelphia, Pennsylvania. Frontman, pianist, and songwriter Adam Weiner has been the band's only constant member since its formation. Beginning as an impromptu recording session in 2010, Low Cut Connie gradually evolved into a vehicle for Weiner's songwriting and onstage persona. The band has earned praise for its high-energy live performances, which Los Angeles Weekly described as "unmatched in all of rock right now." NPR Music described Weiner as "masterfully fluent in the foundational languages of Western pop." Low Cut Connie has also gained prominence for attracting high-profile endorsements such as a surprise inclusion on Barack Obama's Spotify Summer Playlist in 2015, and a personal association with Elton John, who has called the band one of his favorites.

== History ==
=== Early years ===
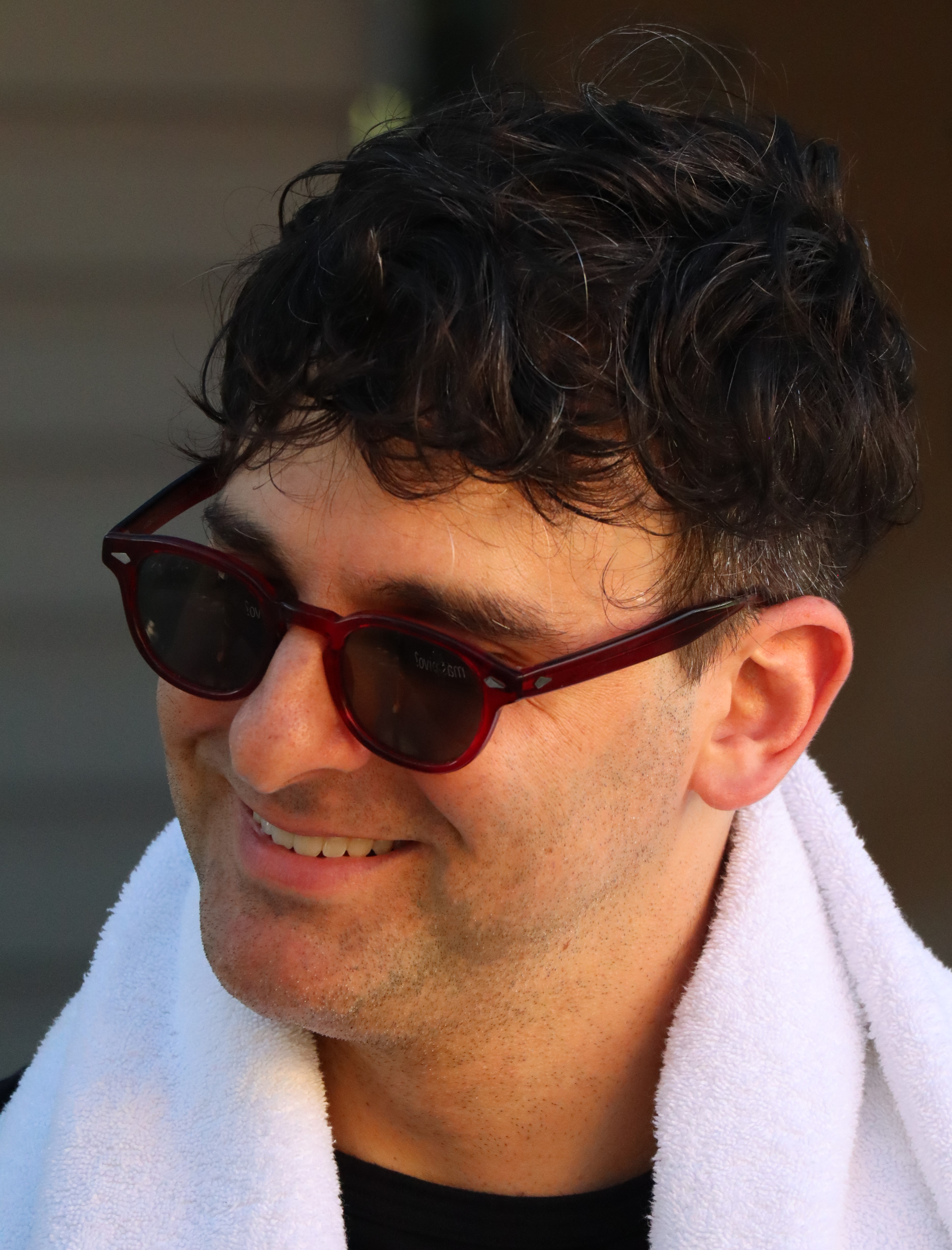
Adam Weiner in 2022

Weiner performed extensively as a solo artist prior to forming Low Cut Connie.

While living in New York City, he played piano in gay bars, karaoke bars, restaurants, and ballet classes— often under the name Ladyfingers. He toured throughout North America and Europe playing to sometimes unforgiving crowds in dive bars, honky tonks, anarchist squats, warehouses and drag bars.

Weiner started the project that would become Low Cut Connie with former members Dan Finnemore (from Birmingham, England) and Neil Duncan (from Gainesville, Florida). After one band member suggested "the Low Cut" as a potential band name and another suggested "the Connies," Weiner combined the two names and dubbed the project Low Cut Connie. He later drew a sketch of a diner waitress from southern New Jersey and decided that she was "Connie." The drawing is on the cover of the band's debut album.

=== Get Out the Lotion ===
The group recorded their debut album, Get Out the Lotion, in guitarist Neil Duncan's garage in Gainesville, Florida, over a period of four days in the summer of 2010. The band recorded songs written by both Weiner and Finnemore, with Duncan engineering. This initial collaboration was informal in nature. At the time of recording, the band and project were both unnamed. Independently recorded and released in 2011, Get Out the Lotion garnered surprising critical attention, including an "A−" from Robert Christgau writing for MSN, and high marks from NPR's Ken Tucker, who praised Weiner's "buzzsaw yowl." The album also prompted Merrill Garbus to name Low Cut Connie her "favorite artist of the year," and was awarded 3.5 out of 5 stars by Rolling Stone, which described it as "what indie rock might sound like were it invented in Alabama in the late Fifties."

=== Call Me Sylvia ===
The band began work on their second album, Call Me Sylvia, in 2011. Finnemore moved to the U.S. in advance of the record's release on September 24, 2012. Original guitarist Neil Duncan departed the band shortly after the album's release. Call Me Sylvia currently holds a score of 80% on Metacritic, indicating "generally favorable reviews," including a 4-out-of-5 star review from AllMusic's Stephen Thomas Erlewine. PopMatters gave the album a score of 7 out of 10, favorably comparing Weiner's piano playing to that of Jerry Lee Lewis. Rolling Stone also likened the album's gritty DIY aesthetic to the work of the Replacements. Barack Obama included the song "Boozophilia" from Call Me Sylvia on his Spotify summer playlist in 2015. Rolling Stone included Call Me Sylvia on its list of the 100 Best Albums of the 2010s.

=== Hi Honey ===
In January 2015, Low Cut Connie announced the completion of their third album, Hi Honey, and was released on April 21, 2015, via Weiner's Contender Records. The record was produced by Thomas Brenneck, former member of Sharon Jones & The Dap-Kings, and producer for projects by Charles Bradley, Black Lips, and Alabama Shakes. Hi Honey features contributions from new band members James Everhart (guitar) and Will Donnelly (bass guitar), as well as guest contributions from Tune-Yards, Dean Ween, Greg Cartwright of Reigning Sound, members of The Dap-Kings, Budos Band, and a cameo by Vincent Pastore of the Sopranos. The album was recorded at a small studio owned by Daptone Records. Hi Honey received critical acclaim, including being named No. 2 album of the year by NPR/Sound Opinions critic Jim DeRogatis.

=== Dirty Pictures (Parts 1 & 2) ===
In May 2016, Weiner and the band began work on Dirty Pictures, which was designed for release in two parts. Dirty Pictures (Part 1) was released on May 19, 2017, by Contender Records to positive critical response. In its review of the album, Rolling Stone drew comparisons to The Rolling Stones, New York Dolls, Jerry Lee Lewis and Paul Westerberg. On May 18, 2018, Low Cut Connie released Dirty Pictures (Part 2), also on Contender Records. The band's fifth album premiered on NPR Music's First Listen with writer Alison Fensterstock noting, "the Philadelphia band's work comes from a place that's fresh, original, and truly pledged to rock and roll." In his four star review, Rolling Stone writer David Fricke called Dirty Pictures (Part 2) a "stand-alone triumph of missionary zeal." The album debuted on Billboard's Independent albums chart. In June 2018, Rolling Stone named the album to its list of 50 Best Albums of 2018 So Far. The publication also named Dirty Pictures (Part 2)'s single "Beverly" one of the 50 Best Songs of 2018. "Beverly" also received recognition from public radio stations around the US, and was named the #1 Most Played Song of 2018 by Philadelphia's WXPN, WXPN's #4 Listener's Choice, and #24 in New York's WFUV list of Top 90 Songs of 2018.

On August 13, 2018, Low Cut Connie made their network television debut, performing "All These Kids Are Way Too High" from Dirty Pictures (Part 2) on Late Night with Seth Meyers. Rolling Stone lauded the band's appearance, saying the band delivered "energy and swagger" to their "rollicking performance."

=== Private Lives ===
On October 16, 2020, Low Cut Connie released the double-length, 17-song Private Lives on Contender Records. Low Cut Connie's sixth album features principal member Adam Weiner with guitarist and long-time collaborator Will Donnelly, as well as a rotating cast of nearly 30 different musicians. Weiner recorded and produced Private Lives on the road, cutting songs in studios across the U.S. during the band's extensive 2019 touring schedule. Private Lives earned critical praise upon its release, with Robert Christgau grading the double-LP an "A−", and calling it "meaty, purposeful, evolved, virtuosic garage-rock with an evangelical edge." PopMatters ranked Private Lives No. 27 on its list of The 60 Best Albums of 2020 and named it the #1 Best Americana Album of the Year. Private Lives ranked No. 34 among Rolling Stone's Best Albums of 2020, #4 on Fresh Air's Top 10 Albums of 2020, and was also included on year-end lists from WXPN's The Key, AllMusic, Glide Magazine, and Indy Review. The album's title track, "Private Lives," ranked among Public Radio's Most Popular Songs of 2020, according to NPR Music.

=== Tough Cookies ===
The COVID-19 crisis and the resulting shut-down of the live music industry forced Low Cut Connie off the road in early 2020. With music venues shuttered and his touring band in quarantine, Weiner performed a livestream concert for a virtual audience out of his South Philadelphia home on March 19, 2020. Weiner dubbed the show Tough Cookies as a tribute to his devoted fan base.

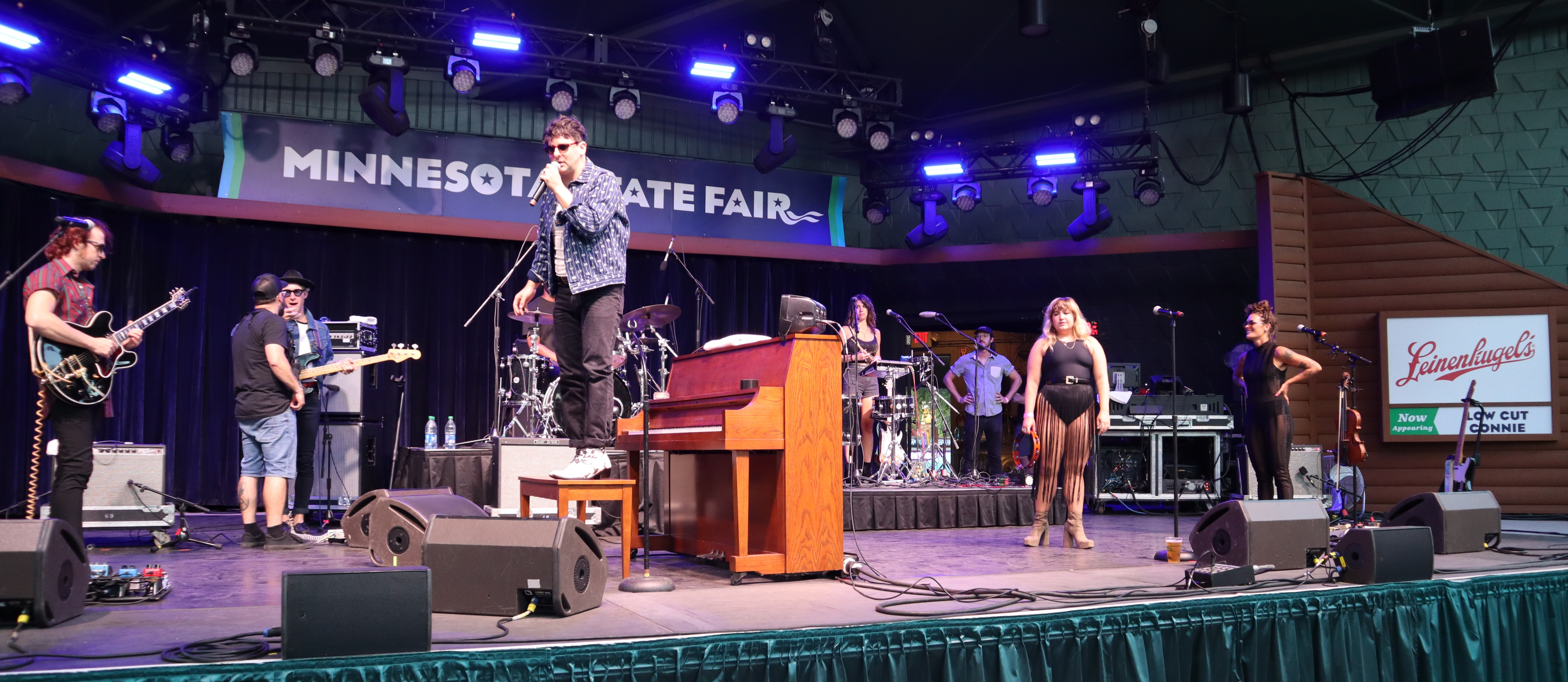
Low Cut Connie at the 2022 Minnesota State Fair

Weiner—often with accompaniment from long-time guitarist and collaborator Will Donnelly—began producing a twice-weekly 1-hour variety show. The show pulled material from a catalog of original songs and cover songs and from interviews with fellow musicians including Dion DiMucci, Darlene Love, Colin Hay, Don Bryant, Joan Osborne, Matthew Sweet, Richard Hell, Mike Nesmith, Amy Rigby, members of Sly and the Family Stone, and others. Tough Cookies has received critical praise for its intimacy and Weiner's energetic performance style. On December 21, 2020, The New Yorker published a full-length feature on the Tough Cookies variety show, naming Weiner "Pandemic Person of the Year" for his ongoing efforts to raise spirits during the COVID-19 pandemic. On February 20, 2021, Tough Cookies, in collaboration with the Rock & Roll Hall of Fame, began airing regular features spotlighting the museum's historical artifacts, exhibits, and inductees.

=== Livin in the USA ===
On February 13, 2025, Weiner announced that he would be cancelling a March 19 performance at the John F. Kennedy Center for the Performing Arts. Rolling Stone reported that the cancellation was in response to President Donald Trump's recent takeover of the previously non-partisan institution. At the time of the cancellation, Weiner cited the band's diverse fan base, saying:

"Many of these folks will be directly negatively affected by this Administration's policies and messaging. Arts institutions are one area that should be immune from our corrosive political culture. I sincerely wish for the Kennedy Center to return to a non-partisan community-building model of arts programming. Until that occurs, I won't perform there."

Other high-profile Kennedy Center cancellations included renowned classical composer Phillip Glass, the New York City Ballet, and the touring company of the acclaimed musical, Hamilton. The Washington National Opera announced an end to its 50-year residency at the Kennedy Center. Kennedy Center artistic advisors Renée Fleming, Shonda Rhimes, and Ben Folds resigned in protest. The number of scheduled performances and ticket sales for the Kennedy Center both plummeted in the months following the Trump administration's takeover.

In May 2025, Low Cut Connie released a single called "Livin in the USA". The politically-charged piano ballad echoed Weiner's earlier criticism of the Trump administration. Though the song does not mention the president or his policies explicitly, it appears to take aim at the administration's hardline immigration policies, and the tactics used by Immigration and Customs Enforcement (ICE) in Minnesota and beyond. Following the release of "Livin in the USA", Weiner was targeted with online threats of violence as well as death threats.

Weiner's outspoken criticism of the Trump administration led to the preemptive cancellation of a scheduled July 25, 2025 performance at the 7th Annual Wilkes-Barre Rockin' the River Festival. At the time of cancellation, Weiner posted an explanation on his Instagram.

"For the first time ever, my show has been canceled for 'political' reasons.The promoters in Luzerne County, PA feel that this weekend's Low Cut Connie show in Wilkes-Barre will be too controversial and polarizing --- Low Cut Connie shows are quite the opposite!!"

Weiner continued:

"We have been doing outdoor public concerts all year (and for many many years) in all parts of the country and they are always pure joy. This is a cowardly and misinformed decision on the part of Luzerne County and a missed opportunity to have a joyful rock n roll show for everyone in their community.”

Luzerne County Manager Romilda Crocamo responded with a statement indicating that "Our goal is to have a place where we can enjoy music, food, promote our community, have fun, be safe and free of politics and propaganda." Festival promoters replaced Low Cut Connie with an AC/DC tribute band called Halfway to Hell. Halfway to Hell was subsequently replaced by another AC/DC tribute act – Back in Black. Luzerne County public officials faced major public blowback for the decision, drawing criticism from local advocates for music and the arts. In response to the cancellation, the nearby Eastern Pennsylvania city King of Prussia invited Low Cut Connie to play a free August 1 show as part of its Concerts Under the Stars series.

On February 13, 2026, Low Cut Connie released an electric version of "Livin in the USA" as a single from the album of the same name. Livin in the USA, Low Cut Connie's 8th studio album, was released on July 3, 2026.

== Celebrity support ==
In addition to critical praise, the band has garnered support from several high-profile individuals including Barack Obama, Elton John, Bruce Springsteen, Howard Stern, Rob Thomas and Nick Hornby.

In August 2015, former President Barack Obama included the band's song "Boozophilia" on his presidential Spotify playlist. Weiner posted on Facebook that they were "completely humbled and honored and confused" by their inclusion alongside artists like Stevie Wonder, Aretha Franklin, and Bob Dylan. Weiner and his wife met Obama at the White House in May 2016 during a special meeting arranged by presidential photographer Pete Souza.

On September 12, 2018, Elton John dedicated a song to Low Cut Connie at his sold-out show at the Wells Fargo Center in Philadelphia. Before performing "Don't Let the Sun Go Down on Me," Elton John announced, "There's a band that I love at the moment so much called Low Cut Connie, who are also from Philadelphia. And I'd like to dedicate this song to them right now, because I love them very much, And you should check them out. Buy their records, go see them." Low Cut Connie had previously been featured on Elton John's radio show Rocket Hour on Beats 1 in July 2017 and August 2018.

In June 2018, Weiner met Bruce Springsteen backstage at Springsteen on Broadway, where he learned Springsteen was a fan of the band. Award-winning author Nick Hornby and radio personality Howard Stern are also a fans of the band. The band was featured twice on Stern's Wrap Up Show, as well as performing in the Howard Stern Tribute to David Bowie.

On January 20, 2021, Low Cut Connie performed as part of the festivities for 46th President Joe Biden's inauguration. The band headlined a virtual home state inauguration event called A Love Letter to Pennsylvania that included appearances from Pennsylvania Senator Bob Casey and Delaware Senator Chris Coons, as well as the incoming President Biden and First Lady Jill Biden.

== Festival appearances ==
In support of the 2018 release Dirty Pictures (Part 2), the band made their debut at several notable US festivals, including Newport Folk Festival, Bonnaroo, Pickathon, and BottleRock. Their performance at Newport Folk Festival was praised by critics, including Rolling Stone who included it in a list of "Newport Folk Festival 2018: 12 Best Things We Saw."

== Discography ==
- Get Out the Lotion (Self-released, 2011)
- Call Me Sylvia (Self-released, 2012)
- Hi Honey (Contender, 2015)
- Dirty Pictures (Part 1) (Contender, 2017)
- Dirty Pictures (Part 2) (Contender, 2018)
- Private Lives (Contender, 2020)
- Tough Cookies: The Best of the Quarantine Broadcasts (Contender, 2021)
- Art Dealers (Contender, 2023)
- Connie Live (Contender, 2024)
- Livin in the USA (Contender, 2026)

== Filmography ==
- Art Dealers (Dark Star Pictures, 2023)

== Lineup ==
=== Current members ===
- Adam Weiner – vocals, piano (2010–present)
- Amanda "Rocky" Bullwinkel – backing vocals (2022–present)
- Nick Perri – bass guitar (2025–present)
- Kelsey Cork – backing vocals, guitar, saxophone (2025–present)
- Rich Stanley – guitar (2025–present)
- Jarae Lewis – drums (2019–present)

=== Former members ===
- Abigail Dempsey – guitar, backing vocals (2019–2024)
- Linwood Regensburg – bass guitar, guitar (2018–2024)
- Will Donnelly – lead / rhythm guitar, bass, drums, vocals (2013–2024)
- Dan Finnemore – guitar, drums, vocals (2010–2016)
- James Everhart – lead guitar, vocals (2013–2018)
- Larry Scotton – drums, bass guitar, vibraphones (2015–2018)
- Lucas Rinz – bass guitar (2016–2018)
- Neil Duncan – guitar (2010–2012)
- Attis Clopton – drums (2021–2023)
- Ian Vos – bass (2012–2013)
- Roger Holcombe – guitar / drums (2012–2013)
- Russell Saliba – bass (2010–2011)
- Ehssan Karimi – drums (2018–2019)
