= Grammy Award for Best Alternative Jazz Album =

Award presented by the Recording Academy

- Nate Smith, the award's recipient in 2026
- Awarded for: Quality vocal or instrumental alternative jazz recordings (albums only)
- Presented by: National Academy of Recording Arts and Sciences
- First award: 2024
- Currently held by: Nate Smith – Live-Action (2026)
- Website: grammy.com

The Grammy Award for Best Alternative Jazz is an award presented by the Recording Academy to honor quality alternative jazz music performances in any given year. The award was presented for the first time at the 66th Annual Grammy Awards in 2024, and is the first new category in the jazz genre field since 1995.

The academy announced the new category in June 2023, stating that the award "recognizes artistic excellence in Alternative Jazz albums by individuals, duos and groups/ensembles, with or without vocals." The academy defines alternative jazz as "a genre-blending, envelope-pushing hybrid that mixes jazz (improvisation, interaction, harmony, rhythm, arrangements, composition, and style) with other genres, including R&B, Hip-Hop, Classical, Contemporary Improvisation, Experimental, Pop, Rap, Electronic/Dance music, and/or Spoken Word. It may also include the contemporary production techniques/instrumentation associated with other genres."

== Background ==
The category was created in response to the growing explosion of crossover jazz and the creativity of contemporary jazz artists who are exploring and incorporating elements of other genres into their music. The Academy specifically cited the work of artists such as The Comet Is Coming, Georgia Anne Muldrow, Kassa Overall, Makaya McCraven, Kamasi Washington, Sons of Kemet and Robert Glasper as examples of jazz's evolving sound and the need for a new category to honor these albums.

Regarding the establishment of this category, which was announced alongside Best Pop Dance Recording and Best African Music Performance, Recording Academy CEO Harvey Mason Jr. stated: "The Recording Academy is proud to announce these latest category changes to our awards process. These changes reflect our commitment to actively listen and respond to the feedback from our music community, accurately represent a diverse range of relevant musical genres, and stay aligned with the ever-evolving musical landscape. By introducing these three new categories, we are able to acknowledge and appreciate a broader array of artists. We are excited to honor and celebrate the creators and recordings in these categories, while also exposing a wider range of music to fans worldwide."

== Recipients ==
Year	Work	Artist
2024	The Omnichord Real Book	Meshell Ndegeocello
2024	Live at the Piano	Cory Henry
2024	Love in Exile	Arooj Aftab, Vijay Iyer and Shahzad Ismaily
2024	Quality Over Opinion	Louis Cole
2024	SuperBlue: The Iridescent Spree	Kurt Elling, Charlie Hunter and SuperBlue
2025	No More Water: The Gospel of James Baldwin	Meshell Ndegeocello
2025	Code Derivation	Robert Glasper
2025	Foreverland	Keyon Harrold
2025	New Blue Sun	André 3000
2025	Night Reign	Arooj Aftab
2026	Live-Action	Nate Smith
2026	Blues Blood	Immanuel Wilkins
2026	Honey from a Winter Stone	Ambrose Akinmusire
2026	Keys to the City Volume One	Robert Glasper
2026	Ride into the Sun	Brad Mehldau
2027	Trip the Night Fantastic	Terri Lyne Carrington & Social Science
2027	Who Asked?	Domi & J.D. Beck
2027	Purpose	Terrace Martin & Marcus Gilmore
2027	Oh Snap	Cécile McLorin Salvant
2027	Fathers	Nate Smith, Kiefer Carrtoons & Kenny Beats

== Artists with multiple awards ==
2 wins

- Meshell Ndegeocello

== Artists with multiple nominations ==
2 nominations

- Arooj Aftab
- Robert Glasper
- Meshell Ndegeocello
