= Okkyung Lee =

South Korean composer (born 1975)

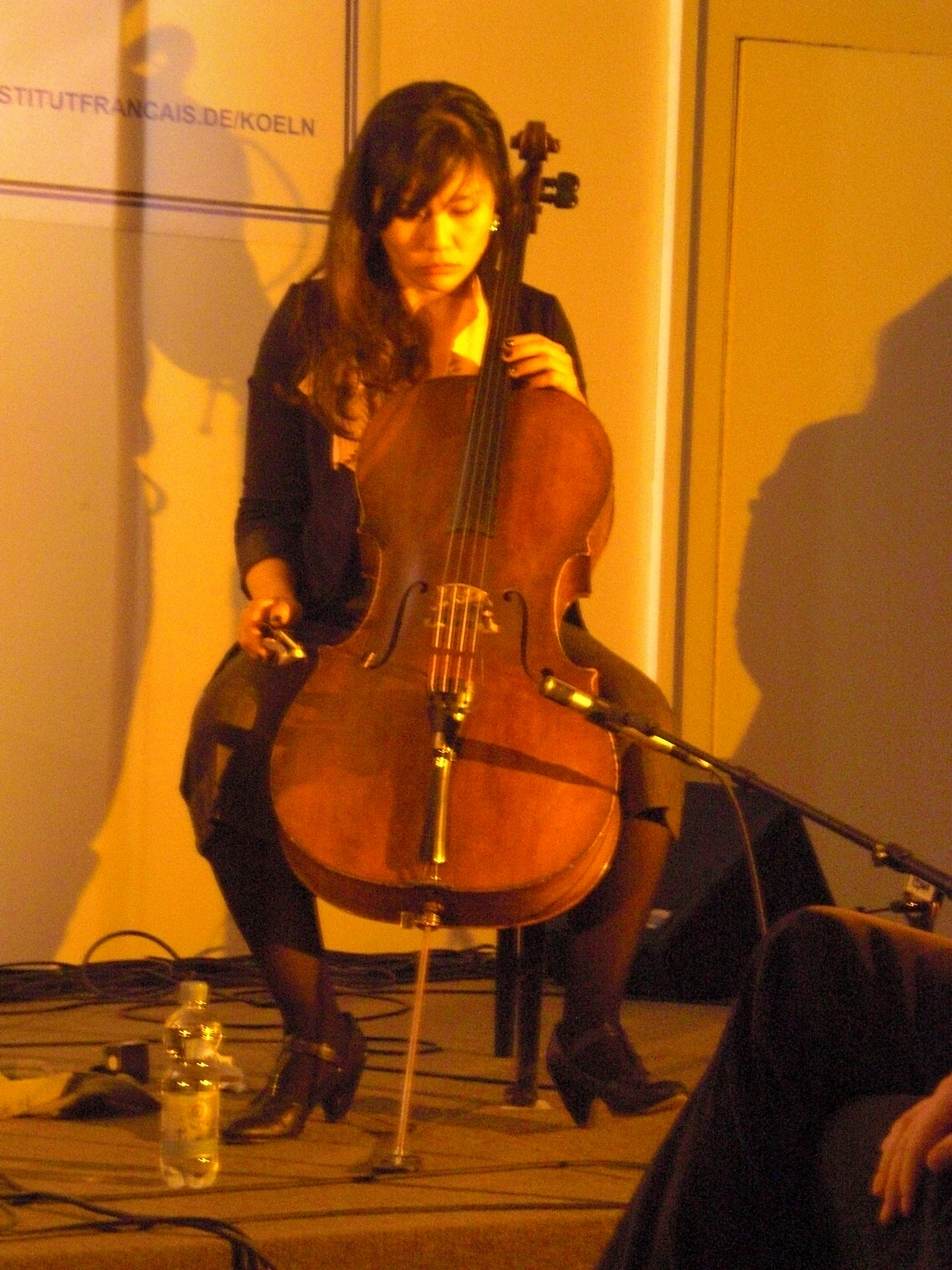
- Okkyung Lee in concert with Achim Kaufmann and Frank Gratkowski during Vive Le Jazz festival at Institut français Cologne, Germany, 15 October 2011

Background information
- Born: 1975 (age 50–51); Daejeon, South Korea
- Genres: Experimental music
- Occupations: Musician, composer, cellist
- Instrument: Cello
- Website: okkyunglee.net

Okkyung Lee (born 1975 in Daejeon, South Korea) is a South Korean cellist, improviser, and composer.

Lee moved to Boston in 1993, where she received a dual bachelor's degree in Contemporary Writing and Production and Film Scoring (Berklee College of Music), and a master's degree in Contemporary Improvisation (New England Conservatory of Music).

In 2000, Lee moved to New York and immersed herself in the city's downtown music scene. Since then, she has collaborated with a wide range of musicians and artists, including Laurie Anderson, Arca, David Behrman, Rashad Becker, Daniel Blumberg, Mark Fell, Douglas Gordon, Jenny Hval, Vijay Iyer, Christian Marclay, Lasse Marhaug, Thurston Moore, Stephen O'Malley, Lawrence D "Butch" Morris, Jim O’Rourke, Evan Parker, Marina Rosenfeld, Wadada Leo Smith, Swans, Cecil Taylor, and John Zorn.

Lee received a Foundation for Contemporary Arts Grant in 2010, Doris Duke Performing Artist Award in 2015 and Instant Award in Improvised Music in 2020. She was a fellow of the DAAD Artist-in-Berlin-Program in 2025.

She played cello in the score for the 2025 film The Testament of Ann Lee.

== Discography ==
=== Solo ===
- Nihm (Tzadik, 2005)
- I Saw The Ghost of an Unknown Soul And It Said… (Ecstatic Peace, 2008)
- Noisy Love Songs (For George Dyer) (Tzadik, 2010)
- Ghil (Ideologic Organ/Editions Mego, 2013)
- Dahl-Tah-Ghi (Pica Disk, 2018)
- Cheol-Kkot-Sae (Steel.Flower.Bird) (Tzadik, 2018)
- Speckled Stones and Dissonant Green Dots (Notice Recordings, 2018)
- Yeo-Neun (여는) (Shelter Press, 2020)
- Teum (The Silvery Slit) split album with Florian Hecker (Portraits GRM, 2020)
- 나를 (Na-Reul) (Corbett vs Dempsey, 2021)
- just like any other day (어느날): background music for your mundane activities (Shelter Press, 2025)
- Signals with Explore Ensenble (Flung, 2026)

=== Collaborations ===
- Rubbings, with Christian Marclay on From The Earth to the Spheres Vol. 7 (Opax, 2005; A Silent Place, 2006). Split LP with My Cat is an Alien.
- Still Life with Commentator, by Vijay Iyer and Mike Ladd (Savoy Jazz, 2007)
- Check for Monsters, with Steve Beresford and Peter Evans (Emanem, 2009)
- Spiritual Dimensions, by Wadada Leo Smith (Cuneiform Records, 2009)
- Femina, by John Zorn (Tzadik, 2009)
- Dictée/Liber Novus, by John Zorn (Tzadik, 2010)
- The Bleeding Edge, with Peter Evans and Evan Parker (psi, 2011)
- Anicca, with Phil Minton (Dancing Wayang, 2011)
- Cold / Burn, with Anla Courtis, C. Spencer Yeh and Jon Wesseltoft (Feeding Tube Records, 2012)
- Almost Even Further with 6ix (Leo Records, 2012)
- White Cables, Black Wires, with John Edwards (Fataka, 2013)
- Look Right, with Nina de Heney and Lisa Ullén (LJ Records, 2013)
- Holding It Down: The Veterans' Dreams Project, by Vijay Iyer and Mike Ladd (Pi Recordings, 2013)
- Wake Up Awesome, with Lasse Marhaug and C. Spencer Yeh (Software, 2013)
- Piper, with Jon Wesseltoft (Holidays Records, 2014)
- Skein, with Richard Barrett, Tony Buck, Frank Gratkowski, Wilbert de Joode, Achim Kaufmann (Leo Records, 2014)
- Seven, by Evan Parker Electroacoustic Septet (Victo, 2015)
- Live at Stone, with Chris Corsano and Bill Nace (Open Mouth, 2015)
- A Pattern For Becoming, by Mark Fell (The Tapeworm, 2015)
- Live at Cafe Oto, with Bill Orcutt (Otoroku, 2016)
- Cloud of Unknowing on The Glowing Man by Swans (Mute/Young God, 2016)
- Amalgam, with Christian Marclay (Northern Spy Records, 2016)
- Obelisk, by Ikue Mori (Tzadik, 2017)
- Libra Rising, with Chris Corsano and Ches Smith (Digital release only on Bandcamp, 2018)
- The Air Around Her, with Ellen Fullman (1703 Skivbolaget, 2018)
- Two Duos, with Jérôme Noetinger and Nadia Ratsimandresy (Oto Roku, 2022)

== In other media ==
Okkyung Lee's performance at the Austrian 2014 Konfrontationen Festival is featured in Alberte Pagán's film Konfrontationen 2914 (2015).
