= Rocky Dawuni =

Ghanaian reggae artist

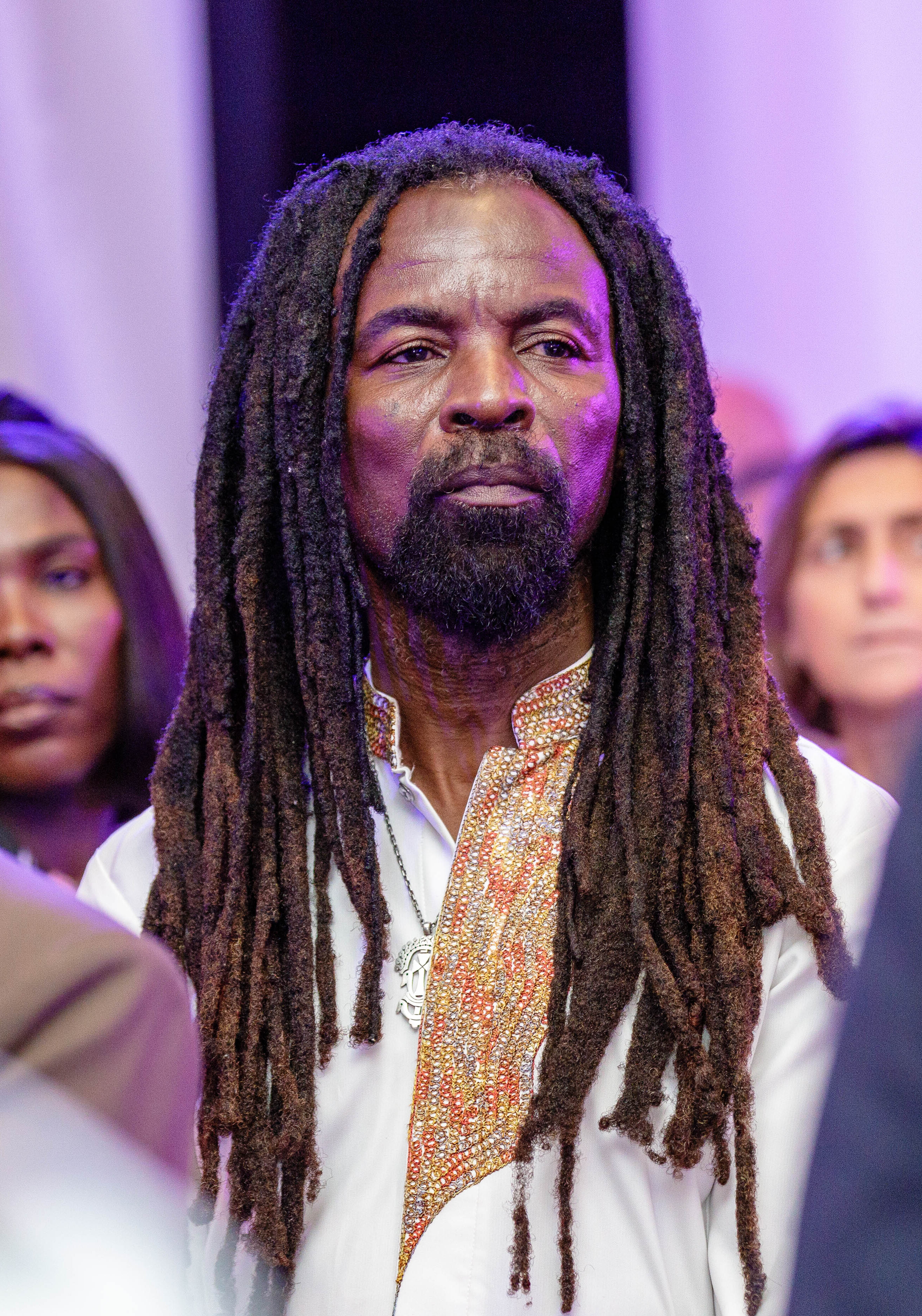
- Rocky Dawuni in 2025
- Occupations: Musician and Activist
- Website: www.rockydawuni.com

Rocky Dawuni is a Ghanaian singer, a four-time Grammy Award nominee, songwriter and record producer who performs his signature 'Afro Roots' sound which is a mixture of Reggae, Afrobeats, Highlife and Soul music. He currently lives between Ghana and United States. Rocky is a musician and activist.

== Music career ==
Dawuni first heard Reggae music in Ghana when a military band performed one of Bob Marley's compositions in Michel Camp; a military barracks near Accra, Ghana's capital city.

Dawuni started the annual "Independence Splash" festival, which is held in Ghana on Ghanaian Independence Day, March 6.

Dawuni has recorded eight full-length albums. His sixth studio album titled Branches of The Same Tree was nominated for a Grammy Award for Best Reggae Album in December 2015 for the 58th Annual Grammy Awards, released March 31, 2015 making him the first nominee from his home country of Ghana. Songlines Magazine named the Branches of Same Tree album in the top 10 most essential reggae albums of all time.

Inspired by the soulful beats of Fela Kuti and Bob Marley, the album highlighted Dawuni's ability to communicate uplifting messages to the ears of millions.

Beats of Zion, the 2019 album by Rocky, which was released January 25 is a precursor to his 7th studio album by the same title, and features Ghanaian dancehall star Stonebwoy. The last video for the albums is "Champion Arise", which was named "Top Tune of the Day" on premier National Public Radio Station KCRW.

In June 2019 Rocky released the new single "Modern Man", remixed by Gaudi. His 8th studio release, Voice of Bunbon, Vol. 1 was nominated during the Grammy Award for Best Global Music Album in the 64th Annual Grammy Awards, making Rocky a multi-Grammy nominee in 2022. Three music videos were released for the EP including "Ghost Town", which was shot by photographer Casey Bridges (son of actor Beau Bridges). The music video "Beautiful People" from the album was shot in Rocky's home village of Bunbon by Ghanaian cinematographer, Slingshot.

Rocky released the music video for "Woara" (which translates as "you or it's you" in Twi) in September 2021. It was sung in the local Akan dialect, Twi. Woara is a love song with a call and response style to express the beauty and triumph of being in love.

In 2022, Dawuni got his third Grammy nomination, thus the Best Global Music Performance for his work “Neva Bow Down” featuring Blvk H3ro. He has had two previous nominations in 2015 and 2021.

In 2024, he released a new single called 'Rise'

== Recognition ==
On September 17, 2025, Rocky Dawuni and four other Ghanaians were given diplomatic passports by Ghana’s Foreign Minister, Samuel Okudzeto Ablakwa, to honor their efforts in promoting Ghana and Africa worldwide.

== Activism and goodwill ==
The musician and activist who is known to straddle the boundaries between Africa, the Caribbean and the U.S. to create sounds that unite generations and cultures works to foster global peace. Dawuni has shared the stage with Stevie Wonder, Peter Gabriel, Bono, Jason Mraz, Janelle Monáe and John Legend, among many others. Named one of Africa's Top 10 global stars by CNN.

Dawuni's stature as a cultural diplomat and successful melding of music and activism have led him to become a spokesperson for various global causes. He is a United Nations Goodwill Ambassador for Africa for UN Environment and is a Global Ambassador for the UN Foundation's Clean Cooking Alliance alongside actress Julia Roberts and Chef José Andrés.

Rocky was named the Global Ambassador for the World Day of African and Afrodescendant Culture recognized by UNESCO, through which he uses his music to shine a light on crucial issues facing humanity across the globe.

Event name	Role	Year
Adinkra International Arts & Crafts Festival (GEPA) 2024	Brand Ambassador, Speaker & Performer	2024
African Youth Conference, Accra, Ghana	Speaker	2024
United Nations Environmental Assembly (UNEA), Nairobi, Kenya	Speaker/Performer	2024
COP28 Dubai, UAE	Speaker & Performer	2023
Accra Reparations Conference 2023	Performer	2023
Swiss Embassy Recycling & Upcycling Event, Accra, Ghana 2023	Speaker	2023
Italian Embassy IRENA Action for Climate Event, Accra, Ghana 2023	Speaker	2023
AMCEN Conference, Addis Ababa, Ethiopia 2023	Speaker	2023
World Environment Day, Abidjan, Cote’Ivoire 2023	Performer / Panelist	2023
International Concert Against Racism, Salvador Bahia, Brazil 2023	Performer / Speaker	2023
Earth Day Beach Clean Up, Ghana 2023	Speaker	2023
International Concert Against Racism, Costa Rica 2023	Speaker / Performer	2023
UNEP Celebration of World Ocean Day, June 2022 (virtual)	Speaker	2022
United Nations Environment Assembly, Nairobi, Kenya March 2022	Speaker / Performer	2022
Launch of Diaspora Flag for Sixth Region of Africa, Accra, Ghana February 2022	Speaker	2022
World Day of African & Afrodescendant Culture, Accra, Ghana January 2022	Speaker	2022
COP26, Scotland, UK October 2021	Ambassador	2021

== Discography ==
Album	Year
The Movement	1996
Crusade	1998
Awakening	2001
Book of Changes	2005
Hymns for the Rebel Soul	2010
Branches of The Same Tree	2015
Beats of Zion	2019
Voice of Bunbon Vol. 1	2020

== Videography ==
Year	Title	Director	Ref
2010	Walk The Talk	—N/a	
2010	African Reggae Fever	—N/a	
2010	Download The Revolution	—N/a	
2015	Nairobi	—N/a	
2015	African Thriller	—N/a	
2017	Shine a Light	—N/a	
2019	Beats of Zion	—N/a	
2019	Elevation	—N/a	
2019	Champion Arise	—N/a	
2022	Neva Bow Down	Slingshot	
2023	Shade Tree	Ema Ribeiro	

== Music featured in movies ==
Soundtrack	Movie title	Movie Genre
Shine a Light	Fist Fight	Comedy

== Music featured on television ==
Track	TV Program	TV Station
Wake the Town	ER	NBC
Jammin Nation	Weeds	Showtime
Jah Be For Us	Weeds (TV series)	Showtime
Shashemane	ER	NBC
Jah Be For Us	Dexter (TV series)	Showtime
Knockin on Heaven's Door	ER	NBC
Turn it Up	Animal Kingdom	TNT (U.S. TV network)
Burn One	Animal Kingdom	TNT (U.S. TV network)

== Music featured on video games ==
Track	EA Games	Year
African Thriller	2014 FIFA World Cup Brazil	2014
Reggae Carnival Style	The Sims 3: Island Paradise	2013
African Soccer Fever	2010 FIFA World Cup South Africa	2010
Download the Revolution	FIFA 10	2009
The One	The Sims 2: Castaway	2008
Wake Up the Town ft. Shee	FIFA 08	2007
