= Annie Ali Khan =

Pakistani journalist and author

- Born: Quratulain Ali Khan; 1980; Karachi, Pakistan
- Died: 21 July 2018 (aged 37–38); Karachi, Pakistan
- Occupations: model, journalist, author
- Known for: “The Missing Daughters of Pakistan” and Sita under the Crescent Moon
- Spouse: Sufyan Khan (divorced)
- Website: www.anniealikhan.com/about/

Quratulain “Annie” Ali Khan (Urdu: قرة العین علی خان; 1980 – 21 July 2018) was a Pakistani model, freelance journalist, and author. Her book Sita under the Crescent Moon was published by Simon and Schuster in 2019. Her work addressed gender and social inequality in Pakistan and the United States, and she wrote about topics such as colorism, religious persecution, cultural assimilation, and violence against women. She died on 21 July 2018 in Karachi.

== Career ==
Ali Khan began modeling after submitting her portfolio to popular photographer Tapu Javeri. Ali Khan worked as a fashion model to several top designers and brand names, and her first break came in a commercial for Lipton Tea. She also worked as a model for the television network MTV and starred in the MTV video Saali Tu Maani Nahin alongside Pakistani singer Shehzad Roy, which became popular at that time and gained positive reviews in Pakistan. While in New York for a video shoot, she met film director Sufyan Khan, married him, and moved to New York.

While living in New York, Ali Khan began a career as a journalist. She received a master's degree in Journalism from the Columbia School of Journalism in New York in 2011, where she studied under Dale Maharidge. She often collaborated with her husband on video projects, such as the series New York Loves Annie for Play TV. In 2012, her breakthrough article “Fair and Lovely” was published in Marie Claire. The article addressed colorism in Pakistan and India and detailed Ali Khan's time as a model for Fair and Lovely skin lightener.

After seven years in the US, Ali Khan returned to Pakistan in 2016. She published widely in newspapers and magazines including Dawn, Herald, The Express Tribune, The Asia Society, The Caravan, Tanqeed, Roads & Kingdoms, and the blog “Chapati Mystery.” She was praised for the brave journalism she pursued, and she wrote about the misogyny and oppression of women in Pakistan. In 2017, Herald magazine published her piece “The Missing Daughters of Pakistan,” which addressed young women murdered in Pakistani towns.

=== Sita under the Crescent Moon ===
In 2016, Roads & Kingdoms published Ali Khan's piece “A Hindu Pilgrimage in Pakistan,” where Ali Khan described following a pilgrimage to Hinglaj in Balochistan. The research done for the piece also kickstarted Ali Khan's three-year project to write about women who “would never be allowed to speak, never be heard if they scream, never be seen if they obstruct, never be understood as equals, as companions, as human beings.” Ali Khan lived among communities of women in Balochistan, Thatta in Sindh, and Lyari in Karachi, who revered Sati, their name for the Hindu goddess Sita. These communities and their pilgrimages form the basis of Ali Khan's book, Sita under the Crescent Moon, published by Simon and Schuster in 2019.

== Personal life and death ==
Ali Khan was born in Karachi, Pakistan. Her maternal grandfather, Sheikh Abbas, was a Sindhi civil engineer, and her father, Masood, was a Muhajir, among the Muslim refugees who fled to Pakistan after Partition, who worked as an airplane pilot. Her aunts had worked as models before her. She moved to Islamabad for a year when she was nine, before returning to Karachi.

Ali Khan graduated from Sir Syed University of Engineering and Technology and received a Master's in Journalism from the Columbia School of Journalism in New York. She was married to film director Sufyan Khan for seven years, during which time she lived in New York.

Ali Khan returned to Karachi in 2016. She was found dead in her apartment in Karachi on 21 July 2018, having suffocated from smoke inhalation from a fire in the apartment.
