= Ed Dante =

Freelance writer

Ed Dante is the pseudonym of Dave Tomar, a freelance writer living in Philadelphia, USA. The writer ignited controversy in the North American academic community when his article The Shadow Scholar appeared in 2010 in The Chronicle of Higher Education.

The article detailed the writer's experiences as a ghostwriter who was paid to help students cheat at every level of formal education. Dave Tomar claimed in his article that he had written nearly 5000 pages of scholarly literature in the last year including a master's degree in cognitive psychology; a PhD in sociology; and essays on history, cinema, labor relations, marketing, philosophy, ethics, and public administration. The writer claims to have assisted college, graduate and doctoral students by accepting money in exchange for writing their assignments over the course of a decade. The Shadow Scholar was met with extensive debate amongst students, educators, and parents. It became the most popularly commented-on article in the Chronicle Review’s history and brought wider attention to issues relating to student cheating, plagiarism, and academic integrity.

In January 2011, Ed Dante appeared on ABC World News with Diane Sawyer and Nightline. On both the programs, Dante's voice and face were concealed.

In March 2011, Ed Dante's The Shadow Scholar received special citation by The National Awards For Education Reporting Association.

In 2012, Tomar wrote a book, also entitled The Shadow Scholar.

Reporting for the Journal of African Cultural Studies, Patricia Kingori wrote that “To date, Tomar’s work is one of the most detailed and influential autobiographies in the field. Almost ten years after The Shadow Scholar was published it remains important for shedding light on the perspectives of those involved in writing assignments and publications for others as part of the “fake essay” industry. However, increasingly, its reach has extended beyond American contexts to speak to African, and in particular Kenyan, writers as the term “Shadow Scholar” is now used to describe...a phenomena [sic] which is now an industrial global enterprise involving the labour of Africans on an unprecedented scale.”

Dave Tomar writes for various online platforms, such as the Huffington Post and Inflection, a college lifestyle publication. The scope of his work includes music; politics; and education, including topics related to academic ghostwriting and essay mills.

On July 17, 2022, Tomar published his second book—The Complete Guide to Cheating in Higher Education—through Academic Influence Press. The Complete Guide is a comprehensive resource on college cheating aimed at educators, administrators, and parents.
