= Nadje Noordhuis =

Australian musician

Nadje Noordhuis is an Australian trumpeter, composer and educator based in New York.

Noordhuis is from Sydney, Australia where she attended The Forest High School. She briefly studied sound engineering before moving to Melbourne to study trumpet and improvisation at the Victorian College of the Arts. She then travelled to New York where she completed her master's degree at Manhattan School of Music.

She runs music label Little Mystery Records.

In 2007, Noordhuis was a semi-finalist in the Thelonious Monk International Jazz Trumpet Competition. She was then selected as a Carnegie Hall Young Artist in 2010, where she studied with Dave Douglas.

She has collaborated with Geoffrey Keezer, Maria Schneider Jazz Orchestra and Arooj Aftab.

As a composer, she has also been commissioned by Sara Caswell, ThoroughBass, ExhAust, the Festival of New Trumpet Music.

== Discography ==
=== Albums ===
Title	Details
Nadje Noordhuis	Released: 2012; Label: Little Mystery Records; Format: CD, digital download
Ten Sails (with Luke Howard)	Released: March 2015; Label: Lukktone (LH004); Format: CD, LP, digital download
Indigo (with James Shipp)	Released: October 2017; Label: Self-published; Format:
Gullfoss	Released: September 2021; Label: Little Mystery Records/Newvelle Records; Format:

She has also featured on albums by Arooj Aftab, the Awakening Orchestra, Zoe Guigueno, Anat Cohen and Darcy James Argue.
