= Gyan Riley =

American guitarist and composer, born 1977

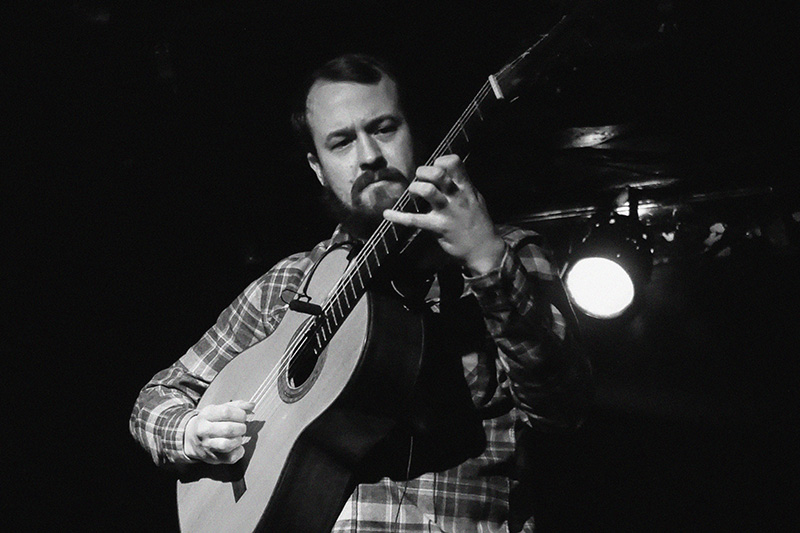
- Gyan Riley in Aarhus, Denmark 2017

Background information
- Born: 1977 (age 48–49)
- Occupations: Musician, composer
- Instrument: Guitar
- Labels: New Albion, Tzadik, Org Music
- Website: gyanriley.com

Gyan Riley (born 1977) is an American guitarist and composer. He is a son of minimalist composer Terry Riley. They frequently toured together as a duo between 2016 and 2020. Gyan Riley studied at San Francisco Conservatory of Music. He has released two solo albums and several collaborative recordings on John Zorn's Tzadik Records. He has also performed with Bill Frisell, Julian Lage, Zakir Hussain, Dawn Upshaw, Nels Cline, Lee Ranaldo, Iva Bittová., and currently frequently tours with Grammy-winning vocalist Arooj Aftab. Recently he was featured as a performer and composer for two acclaimed PBS documentary series by Ken Burns and Lynn Novick: Hemingway, and The U.S. and the Holocaust. Currently Gyan is engaged as the 2023/24 Lou Harrison House Composer in Residence in Joshua Tree, CA.

== Discography ==
=== As leader ===
- Food for the Bearded (New Albion, 2002)
- Melismantra (Self-released, 2007)
- New York Sessions (Agyanamus Music, 2010)
- Stream of Gratitude (Tzadik, 2011)
- Terry Riley & Gyan Riley Live with Terry Riley (Sri Moonshine Music, 2011)
- Sprig (National Sawdust Tracks, 2018)
- Way Out Yonder with Terry Riley (Org Music, 2019)
- Shelter in Space (Agyanamus Music, 2020)
- Silver Lining (Tzadik, 2021)

=== As sideman ===
With John Zorn

- John Zorn’s Olympiad Volume 1: Dither Plays Zorn (Tzadik, 2015) with Dither
- Midsummer Moons (Tzadik, 2017) with Julian Lage
- The Book Beri'ah: Chesed (Tzadik, 2018) with Julian Lage
- Nove Cantici Per Francesco D'Assisi (Tzadik, 2019) with Julian Lage and Bill Frisell
- Virtue (Tzadik, 2020) with Julian Lage and Bill Frisell
- Teresa De Ávila (Tzadik, 2021) with Julian Lage and Bill Frisell
- Parables (Tzadik, 2021) with Julian Lage and Bill Frisell
- A Garden of Forking Paths (Tzadik, 2022) with Julian Lage and Bill Frisell
- Bagatelles Vol. 10 (Tzadik, 2022) with Julian Lage
