= Barack Obama's summer playlist =

Playlist series

Barack Obama's summer playlist is an annual music playlist curated by former President of the United States Barack Obama. The president has shared a playlist, curated by himself, most summers since 2015. The lists consist of a mix of classic and contemporary songs spanning a variety of genres. The response to the playlists has been mostly positive, though with some noted detractors.

== History ==
Barack Obama shared his first summer playlists in August 2015, while he and his family were on vacation in Martha's Vineyard. The selection came in two lists, "Volume 1: Summer Day" and "Volume 2: Summer Night". The playlists were the first posted to the White House's official Spotify account.

Other playlists Obama has shared include a Christmas music playlist released on Christmas Eve 2015 and a workout playlist commissioned by Wired in October 2016. In 2018, the president's wife Michelle Obama released a Valentine's Day playlist called "Forever Mine". In 2026, Obama shared a playlist titled "President Obama's Throwback Favorites", consisting of music played on the second floor of the Barack Obama Presidential Center in Chicago, which Obama said was "meant to bring visitors back in time to his and Michelle Obama's formative years".

In 2017, Obama jokingly said he wanted a job at Spotify after his presidency. In response, Spotify posted a job listing for a "President of Playlists", with listed requirements including "at least eight years' experience running a highly-regarded nation ... a friendly and warm attitude, and a Nobel Peace Prize". Spotify CEO Daniel Ek tweeted a link to the listing to Obama, saying "I heard you were interested in a role at Spotify. Have you seen this one?" The following year, Barack and Michelle signed a multi-year podcast production partnership agreement with Spotify through their production company, Higher Ground Productions.

== Curation ==
Obama curates the playlists himself, which he says people have expressed doubt about. In an interview with Hasan Minhaj, he said "People believe the books and the movies, but the playlists, they somehow think... and this is somehow coming from young people like you. Somehow y'all think you invented rock and roll. You invented hip hop. And so the fact that my lists are, you know, pretty incredible, people seem to think, 'Well he must have had some 20-year-old intern who was figuring out this latest cut.' No man, it's on my iPad right now." He admitted to taking suggestions, saying "it's not like I got time to be listening to music all the time. So typically at the end of the year what happens is folks will be like, 'Man, you need to listen to this. This is good.' But unless I'm actually listening to it, watching it, reading it, I won't put it on there."

== Response ==
Okkervil River's Will Sheff responded positively to being included in 2015. Low Cut Connie also responded positively initially, though two years later, the band's frontman Alex Weiner reported having seen no change in their career success after the inclusion. The Verge's Kaitlyn Tiffany called the list "carefully and painstakingly crafted to cover every major genre of American music", but was disappointed by the exclusion of the One Direction song "Drag Me Down", noting that One Direction member Niall Horan "could be recognized as the biggest Barack Obama fan in the world."

In a 2016 piece for The Guardian, Rebecca Carroll wrote about how that year's playlist was symbolic of Obama's reaffirmation of his Blackness. She said there was "no black cultural marker more abiding than our music". She highlighted his inclusion of the Aloe Blacc song "The Man" which she called "a bonafide black man's anthem"; and the song "I'll Be There for You/You're All I Need to Get By" by Method Man featuring Mary J. Blige, where she compared Obama's relationship with his wife Michelle to the one depicted in the song's music video, "the blackest, most glorious, magnificent display of camaraderie, love and loyalty."

Following the inclusion of the Boygenius song "Not Strong Enough" on the 2023 list, band member Lucy Dacus responded in a tweet with the words "war criminal :(". Multiple publications and numerous social media users singled out the 2024 list for not including pop singer Chappell Roan, who had significant success that year. The social media response led to the words "No Chappell Roan" trending in Twitter's politics category.

== Playlists ==
=== 2015 ===
The 2015 playlists, released on August 15, included:

- "Volume 1: Summer Day"
1. The Temptations – "Ain't Too Proud to Beg"
2. The Isley Brothers – "Live It Up"
3. Talib Kweli and Hi-Tek – "Memories Live"
4. Bob Dylan – "Tombstone Blues"
5. Bob Marley – "So Much Trouble in the World"
6. Coldplay – "Paradise"
7. Mala Rodríguez – "Tengo Un Trato (Remix)"
8. Howlin' Wolf – "Wang Dang Doodle"
9. Stevie Wonder – "Another Star"
10. Sly and the Family Stone – "Hot Fun in the Summertime"
11. Low Cut Connie – "Boozophilia"
12. Brandi Carlile – "Wherever Is Your Heart"
13. Nappy Roots – "Good Day"
14. John Legend – "Green Light"
15. The Rolling Stones – "Gimme Shelter"
16. Aretha Franklin – "Rock Steady"
17. Okkervil River – "Down Down the Deep River"
18. Justin Timberlake – "Pusher Love Girl"
19. Florence and the Machine – "Shake It Out"
20. Sonora Carruseles – "La Salsa La Traigo Yo"
- "Volume 2: Summer Night"
1. John Coltrane – "My Favorite Things"
2. Beyoncé and Frank Ocean – "Superpower"
3. Van Morrison – "Moondance"
4. Lianne La Havas – "Is Your Love Big Enough?"
5. Al Green – "How Can You Mend a Broken Heart"
6. Aoife O'Donovan – "Red & White & Blue & Gold"
7. Lauryn Hill and D'Angelo – "Nothing Even Matters"
8. Frank Sinatra – "The Best Is Yet to Come"
9. Ray Charles – "You Don't Know Me"
10. Mary J. Blige – "I Found My Everything"
11. Joni Mitchell – "Help Me"
12. Otis Redding – "I've Got Dreams to Remember"
13. Leonard Cohen – "Suzanne"
14. Nina Simone – "Feeling Good"
15. The Lumineers – "Stubborn Love"
16. Cassandra Wilson – "Until"
17. Mos Def – "UMI"
18. Billie Holiday – "The Very Thought of You"
19. Miles Davis – "Flamenco Sketches"
20. Erykah Badu – "Woo"

=== 2016 ===
The 2016 playlists, released on August 11, included:

- Daytime
1. Wale – "LoveHate Thing" (featuring Sam Dew)
2. Leon Bridges – "Smooth Sailin'"
3. Courtney Barnett – "Elevator Operator"
4. Edward Sharpe and the Magnetic Zeros – "Home"
5. Sara Bareilles – "Many the Miles"
6. Janelle Monáe – "Tightrope"
7. Jidenna – "Classic Man" (featuring Roman GianArthur)
8. Jay-Z – "So Ambitious" (featuring Pharrell)
9. Manu Chao – "Me Gustas Tu"
10. Common – "Forever Begins"
11. Aloe Blacc – "The Man"
12. Nas and Damian "Jr. Gong" Marley – "As We Enter"
13. Nina Simone – "Sinnerman"
14. Prince – "U Got the Look"
15. Aretha Franklin – "Rock Steady"
16. The Beach Boys – "Good Vibrations"
17. Gary Clark Jr. – "Don't Owe You a Thang"
18. Gin Wigmore – "Man Like That"
19. Charles Mingus – "II B.S. (edit)"
- Nighttime
1. Chrisette Michele – "If I Have My Way"
2. Esperanza Spalding – "Espera"
3. Aaron Neville – "Tell It Like It Is"
4. Ledisi – "Alright"
5. Denise LaSalle – "Trapped by a Thing Called Love"
6. D'Angelo – "Lady"
7. Tower of Power – "So Very Hard to Go"
8. Carmen McRae – "Midnight Sun"
9. Caetano Veloso – "Cucurrucucú paloma"
10. Corinne Bailey Rae – "Green Aphrodisiac"
11. Mary J. Blige / Method Man – "I'll Be There for You/You're All I Need to Get By"
12. Billie Holiday – "Lover Man (Oh, Where Can You Be?)"
13. Fiona Apple – "Criminal"
14. Chance the Rapper – "Acid Rain"
15. Miles Davis – "My Funny Valentine"
16. Anthony Hamilton – "Do You Feel Me"
17. Janet Jackson – "I Get Lonely"
18. Lizz Wright – "Lean In"
19. War – "All Day Music"
20. Floetry – "Say Yes"

=== 2019 ===
The 2019 playlist, released on August 24, included:

1. Drake – "Too Good" (featuring Rihanna)
2. The Spinners – "I'll Be Around"
3. Beyoncé, Jay-Z, and Childish Gambino – "Mood 4 Eva" (featuring Oumou Sangaré)
4. Maggie Rogers – "Burning"
5. The Avener and Phoebe Killdeer – "Fade Out Lines (The Avener Rework)"
6. Lizzo – "Juice"
7. Steely Dan – "Reelin' In the Years"
8. Terence Trent D'Arby – "Who's Lovin' You"
9. Stevie Wonder – "Don't You Worry 'bout a Thing"
10. GoldLink – "Joke Ting" (featuring Ari PenSmith)
11. Sharon Van Etten – "Seventeen"
12. Lauryn Hill – "Doo Wop (That Thing)"
13. Raphael Saadiq – "100 Yard Dash"
14. Frank Sinatra – "I've Got You Under My Skin"
15. Daniel Caesar and H.E.R. – "Best Part"
16. BJ the Chicago Kid – "Feel the Vibe" (featuring Anderson .Paak)
17. Shawn Mendes and Camila Cabello – "Señorita"
18. Dobie Gray – "Drift Away"
19. Sounds of Blackness – "Hold On (Change Is Comin')"
20. Van Morrison – "Brown Eyed Girl"
21. Donny Hathaway – "I Love You More Than You'll Ever Know"
22. SZA – "Go Gina"
23. 2 Chainz – "It's a Vibe" (featuring Ty Dolla Sign, Trey Songz, and Jhené Aiko)
24. Mac Miller – "Dang!" (featuring Anderson .Paak)
25. Ella Fitzgerald – "How High the Moon"
26. Erick Sermon – "Music" (featuring Marvin Gaye)
27. The Black Keys – "Go"
28. Koffee – "Toast"
29. Ella Mai – "Boo'd Up"
30. DJ Khaled – "Shining" (featuring Beyoncé and Jay-Z)
31. Rosalía and J Balvin – "Con Altura" (featuring El Guincho)
32. Charles Mingus – "II B.S."
33. Jill Scott – "It's Love"
34. The Rolling Stones – "Happy"
35. John Legend – "Alright"
36. Esperanza Spalding – "Espera"
37. Toots and the Maytals – "54-46 Was My Number"
38. The Youngbloods – "Get Together"
39. Anthony Hamilton – "Float"
40. Lil Nas X – "Old Town Road (Remix)" (featuring Billy Ray Cyrus)
41. Robin Thicke – "Can U Believe"
42. Rema – "Iron Man"
43. Q-Tip – "Believe" (featuring D'Angelo)
44. A Tribe Called Quest – "Can I Kick It?"

=== 2020 ===
The 2020 playlist, released on August 17, included:

1. Leon Bridges and Khruangbin – "Texas Sun"
2. Common – "Forever Begins"
3. John Legend – "Don't Walk Away" (featuring Koffee)
4. The Chicks – "Gaslighter"
5. Billie Eilish – "My Future"
6. Maggie Rogers – "Love You for a Long Time"
7. Billy Porter – "For What It's Worth"
8. Jennifer Hudson – "Feeling Good"
9. Megan Thee Stallion – "Savage Remix" (featuring Beyoncé)
10. Teyana Taylor – "Made It"
11. Rihanna – "Work" (featuring Drake)
12. Young T & Bugsey – "Don't Rush" (featuring Headie One)
13. Khalid and Disclosure – "Know Your Worth Remix" (featuring Davido and Tems)
14. Popcaan – "Twist & Turn" (featuring Drake and PartyNextDoor)
15. Wizkid – "Smile" (featuring H.E.R.)
16. Bob Marley and the Wailers – "Could You Be Loved"
17. Jorja Smith – "Be Honest" (featuring Burna Boy)
18. Princess Nokia – "Gemini"
19. J. Cole – "The Climb Back"
20. Nas – "Memory Lane (Sittin' in da Park)"
21. Mac Miller – "Blue World"
22. Andrea Valle – "Know You Bare"
23. Maye – "Tú"
24. Childish Gambino – "12.38" (featuring 21 Savage, Ink, and Kadhja Bonet)
25. War – "All Day Music"
26. Otis Redding – "These Arms of Mine"
27. Billie Holiday – "I'll Be Seeing You"
28. Outkast – "Liberation"
29. Moses Sumney – "Rank & File"
30. Stevie Wonder – "Do I Do"
31. Haim – "The Steps"
32. Bonnie Raitt – "Nick of Time"
33. Sheryl Crow – "All I Wanna Do"
34. Bob Dylan – "Goodbye Jimmy Reed"
35. Jason Isbell and the 400 Unit – "Be Afraid"
36. Andy Shauf – "Neon Skyline"
37. Cassandra Wilson – "Solomon Sang"
38. Frank Ocean – "Cayendo"
39. Summer Walker – "My Affection" (featuring PartyNextDoor)
40. Kyle – "The Sun" (featuring Bryson Tiller and Raphael Saadiq)
41. PartyNextDoor – "PGT"
42. H.E.R. – "As I Am"
43. Beyoncé – "Already" (featuring Shatta Wale and Major Lazer)
44. Little Simz – "One Life, Might Live"
45. Tank and the Bangas – "Spaceships"
46. D'Angelo – "Higher"
47. Chet Baker – "Let's Get Lost"
48. Nina Simone – "My Baby Just Cares for Me"
49. John Coltrane – "Impressions"
50. Anderson .Paak – "Lockdown"
51. Lil Mosey – "Back At It" (featuring Lil Baby)
52. J Balvin – "Un Día (One Day)" (featuring Dua Lipa, Bad Bunny, and Tainy)
53. Chika – "Crown"

=== 2021 ===
The 2021 playlist, released on July 11, included:

1. Jazmine Sullivan – "Pick Up Your Feelings"
2. Protoje – "Switch It Up" (featuring Koffee)
3. Simply Red – "Holding Back the Years"
4. George Harrison – "My Sweet Lord"
5. Migos – "Straightenin"
6. Rihanna – "Desperado"
7. Silk Sonic – "Leave the Door Open"
8. Sarah Vaughan – "Interlude"
9. Rochy RD, Myke Towers, and Nicki Nicole – "Ella No Es Tuya (Remix)"
10. The Rolling Stones – "Tumbling Dice"
11. Masked Wolf – "Astronaut in the Ocean"
12. Sabrina Claudio – "Frozen"
13. Stevie Wonder – "If You Really Love Me"
14. Miles Davis – "Walkin'"
15. Bob Marley & The Wailers – "Exodus"
16. Chicago – "Does Anybody Really Know What Time It Is?"
17. Joni Mitchell – "Coyote"
18. Arooj Aftab – "Mohabbat"
19. Erykah Badu – "Didn't Cha Know?"
20. Jay-Z – "Allure"
21. Kékélé – "Conséquence"
22. Roy Ayers Ubiquity – "Everybody Loves the Sunshine"
23. Nezi – "So Hard"
24. Bob Dylan – "I'll Be Your Baby Tonight"
25. J. Cole – "Neighbors"
26. SZA – "Good Days"
27. Brother Sundance – "Text You Back" (featuring Bryce Vine)
28. Michael Kiwanuka – "You Ain't the Problem (Claptone Remix)"
29. Wasis Diop – "Everything (...Is Never Quite Enough)"
30. Smokey Robinson & The Miracles – "The Tears of a Clown"
31. Drake – "Wants and Needs" (featuring Lil Baby)
32. Elis Regina and Antônio Carlos Jobim – "Águas de março"
33. Wye Oak – "Its Way With Me"
34. The Staple Singers – "I'll Take You There"
35. H.E.R. – "Find a Way" (featuring Lil Baby)
36. Louis Armstrong – "A Kiss to Build a Dream On"
37. Brandi Carlile – "Speak Your Mind"
38. Ella Fitzgerald – "Lush Life"

=== 2022 ===
The 2022 playlist, released on July 26, included:

1. Beyoncé – "Break My Soul"
2. Tems – "Vibe Out"
3. Harry Styles – "Music for a Sushi Restaurant"
4. The Spinners – "Mighty Love"
5. Joe Cocker – "Feelin' Alright"
6. Sampa the Great – "Energy" (featuring Nadeem Din-Gabisi)
7. Rosalía – "Saoko"
8. Lil Yachty – "Split/Whole Time"
9. Prince – "Let's Go Crazy"
10. Maggie Rogers – "That's Where I Am"
11. Al Green – "I Can't Get Next to You"
12. Dr. John – "More Than You Know"
13. Miles Davis – "Blue in Green"
14. Burna Boy – "Last Last"
15. Doechii – "Persuasive"
16. Hope Tala – "Cherries" (featuring Aminé)
17. Aretha Franklin – "Save Me"
18. Lyle Lovett – "Nobody Knows Me"
19. Bad Bunny and Bomba Estéreo – "Ojitos Lindos"
20. Koffee – "Pull Up"
21. Bruce Springsteen – "Dancing in the Dark"
22. Wet Leg – "Angelica"
23. Rakim – "When I B on Tha Mic"
24. Drake – "Too Good" (featuring Rihanna)
25. D'Angelo – "Spanish Joint"
26. Nina Simone – "Do I Move You? (Version II)"
27. Dave Brubeck – "Take Five"
28. Pheelz – "Finesse" (featuring Buju)
29. Amber Mark – "Bliss"
30. Jacob Banks – "Found"
31. Caamp – "Apple Tree Blues"
32. Otis Redding – "I've Been Loving You Too Long"
33. Wyclef Jean – "Guantanamera" (featuring Ms. Lauryn Hill)
34. Jack White – "I'm Shakin'"
35. Big John Hamilton – "I Just Want to Thank You"
36. Fatboy Slim – "Praise You"
37. Dijon – "Many Times"
38. The Foreign Exchange – "Better" (featuring Shana Tucker and Eric Roberson)
39. Omar Apollo – "Tamagotchi"
40. Maren Morris – "The Furthest Thing"
41. The Internet – "Under Control"
42. Kendrick Lamar – "Die Hard"
43. Vince Staples and Mustard – "Magic"
44. Kacey Musgraves – "Keep Lookin Up"

=== 2023 ===
The 2023 playlist, released on July 20, included:

1. J Hus – "Who Told You" (featuring Drake)
2. SZA – "Snooze"
3. The Pretenders – "I'll Stand by You"
4. Rosalía and Rauw Alejandro – "Vampiros"
5. Luke Combs – "Fast Car"
6. 2Pac – "California Love" (featuring Roger Troutman and Dr. Dre)
7. Leonard Cohen – "Dance Me to the End of Love (Live)"
8. Martha and the Vandellas – "Nowhere to Run"
9. Nobigdyl. – "Parabolic!"
10. Jorja Smith – "Try Me"
11. Burna Boy – "Sittin' on Top of the World" (featuring 21 Savage)
12. Janet Jackson – "Got 'til It's Gone" (featuring Q-Tip and Joni Mitchell)
13. La Doña – "Penas con Pan"
14. The Bangles – "Walk Like an Egyptian"
15. The Beths – "Watching the Credits"
16. The War and Treaty – "That's How Love Is Made"
17. The Rolling Stones – "Soul Survivor"
18. Aretha Franklin – "Dr. Feelgood (Love Is a Serious Business)"
19. John Coltrane – "Blue Train"
20. Ice Spice and Nicki Minaj – "Princess Diana"
21. Toots and the Maytals – "Funky Kingston"
22. The Righteous Brothers – "Unchained Melody"
23. Golden Lady – "Stevie Wonder"
24. Jackson Browne – "Doctor, My Eyes"
25. Ayra Starr – "Sability"
26. Boygenius – "Not Strong Enough"
27. Otis Redding – "(Sittin' On) The Dock of the Bay"
28. Bob Dylan – "Everything Is Broken"
29. Ella Fitzgerald – "Cry Me a River"
30. Yng Lvcas and Peso Pluma – "La Bebé (Remix)"
31. Money Man and Babyface Ray – "Drums"
32. Nas – "The World Is Yours"
33. Four Tops – "Reach Out I'll Be There"
34. Pearl Jam – "Just Breathe"
35. J'calm – "Tempted"
36. Kelela – "Contact"
37. Marvin Gaye – "Inner City Blues (Make Me Wanna Holler)"
38. Ike & Tina Turner – "River Deep – Mountain High"
39. Janelle Monáe – "Only Have Eyes 42"
40. Ashley McBryde – "The Devil I Know"
41. Michael Kiwanuka – "Love & Hate"

=== 2024 ===
The 2024 playlist, released on August 12, included:

1. Shaboozey – "A Bar Song (Tipsy)"
2. Charli XCX – "365"
3. Billie Eilish – "Chihiro"
4. Tems – "Love Me JeJe"
5. Artemas – "I Like the Way You Kiss Me"
6. Tommy Richman – "Million Dollar Baby"
7. Hope Tala – "I Can't Even Cry"
8. Blackstreet – "No Diggity" (featuring Dr. Dre and Queen Pen)
9. Enny – "Charge It"
10. Carminho – "O Quarto (Soundtrack Version)"
11. Calimossa – "What's in the Tea?"
12. Hubert Sumlin and Keith Richards – "I Love the Life I Live, I Live the Life I Love"
13. PJ Morton and JoJo – "Say So"
14. Cleo Sol – "Why Don't You"
15. The Miracles – "You've Really Got a Hold on Me"
16. H.E.R. – "Process"
17. 2Pac – "How Do U Want It" (featuring K-Ci & JoJo)
18. Sting – "If You Love Somebody Set Them Free"
19. Lucinda Williams – "Unsuffer Me"
20. Jill Scott – "Golden"
21. The Rolling Stones – "(I Can't Get No) Satisfaction"
22. Saweetie – "My Best"
23. Charles Mingus – "Wednesday Night Prayer Meeting"
24. Norah Jones – "Come Away with Me"
25. Common – "The People"
26. Etta James – "Don't Cry Baby"
27. Chris Jedi, Gaby Music, and Dei V – "Bad Boy" (featuring Anuel AA and Ozuna)
28. Rema – "Yayo"
29. Bonny Light Horseman – "Old Dutch"
30. Willow – "Symptom of Life"
31. Moneybagg Yo – "Whiskey Whiskey" (featuring Morgan Wallen)
32. Myles Smith – "Stargazing"
33. GloRilla and Megan Thee Stallion – "Wanna Be"
34. Tyla, Gunna, and Skillibeng – "Jump"
35. Bad Bunny and Feid – "Perro Negro"
36. Paul Russell – "Lil Boo Thang"
37. Digable Planets – "Rebirth of Slick (Cool Like Dat)"
38. Bob Marley and the Wailers – "Them Belly Full (But We Hungry)"
39. Nick Drake – "One of These Things First"
40. Bob Dylan – "Silvio"
41. Pharoah Sanders – "Love Is Everywhere"
42. The Supremes – "Where Did Our Love Go"
43. Beyoncé – "Texas Hold 'Em"
44. Samara Joy – "Someone to Watch Over Me (featuring Pasquale Grasso)

=== 2026 ===
The 2026 playlist, released on July 30, 2026, included:

- Glen Hansard – "Song of Good Hope"
- Gabriel Jacoby – "The One"
- Doechii and SZA – "Girl, Get Up"
- Yebba – "West Memphis"
- Noah Kahan – "Doors"
- Earth, Wind & Fire – "Can't Hide Love"
- The Strokes – "Going Shopping"
- Kelela – "Idea 1"
- October London – "Make Me Wanna"
- Fred Hammond – "I Feel Good"
- Charley Crockett – "One Eyed Jack"
- Rawayana and Manuel Turizo – "Inglés en Miami"
- Vince Staples – "White Flag"
- Mumford & Sons featuring Hozier – "Rubber Band Man"
- BossMan Dlow – "Motion Party"
- Vale Pintos, Brytiago, Casper Mágico, and Héctor el Father – "LA Father (Remix)"
- Gvrden Boy – "Fiesta"
- Temper City – "Self Aware"
- Tyla featuring Zara Larsson – "She Did It Again"
- Baby Rose featuring Leon Thomas – "Friends Again"
- Luther Vandross – "Anyone Who Had a Heart"
- Chaka Khan – "Ain't Nobody"
- Abel Selaocoe – "Emmanuele"
- The Police – "Message in a Bottle"
- David Bowie – "Modern Love"
- Sheryl Crow – "The Book"
- A Tribe Called Quest featuring Trugoy the Dove – "Award Tour"
- The Beatles – "Revolution"
- Lizz Wright – "Hit the Ground"
- Coldplay – "Charlie Brown"
- Los Lobos – "Don't Worry Baby"
- Marvin Gaye – "Let's Get It On"
- Habib Koité and Bamada – "I Ka Barra"
- The Temptations – "(I Know) I'm Losing You"
- Howlin' Wolf – "Do the Do"
- Damian Marley featuring Nas – "Road to Zion"
- Raye – "Where Is My Husband!"
- Nina Simone – "In the Dark"
- Neil Young – "Heart of Gold"
- Drake featuring Future and Molly Santana – "Ran to Atlanta"
- Johnny Cash – "Folsom Prison Blues"
- Sam & Dave – "Hold On, I'm Comin'"
- Buena Vista Social Club – "Candela"
- Anderson .Paak – "Yada Yada"
- Ledisi featuring Paul Jackson Jr. – "You Go to My Head"
- Sonny Rollins – "Strode Rode"
