= Jamey Haddad =

American percussionist

- Born: Jamey George Haddad; July 2, 1952 (age 74); Cleveland, Ohio, U.S.
- Genres: Jazz; world music
- Instrument: Percussion
- Website: JameyHaddadMusic.com

Jamey George Haddad (born July 2, 1952 in Cleveland, Ohio) is an American percussionist who works primarily in the fields of jazz and world music and specializes in hand drums.

== Biography ==
Haddad is of Lebanese ancestry. From the age of four, he began playing Lebanese percussion instruments, such as the goblet drum. He later studied music at the Berklee College of Music in Boston, Massachusetts. He lived in New York City for over 20 years. In 2002, he and his family moved to Shaker Heights, Ohio. He teaches at the Oberlin Conservatory of Music in Oberlin, Ohio. He is also artistic director of the Fridays at 7 series at Cleveland's Severance Hall. This series features the Cleveland Orchestra and a secondary performance of folk artists from around the world.

== Music career ==
For five years, Haddad studied Carnatic music, a form of Indian classical music, with Ramnad Raghavan. He received a Fulbright Fellowship, which allowed him to study South Indian Carnatic music, including the mridangam, kanjira, and ghatam in South India for one more year. Haddad is the 2010 recipient of the Cleveland Arts Prize and a Legends of Jazz Award. He has received four National Endowment for the Arts fellowships to pursue jazz and international studies and collaborations. Haddad has lived and had extended study of music in North Africa, Brazil, Venezuela and the Middle East.

Jamey Haddad started performing with Paul Simon as his percussionist from 1998 till 2026.He has also worked with the Paul Winter Consort, Dave Liebman, Joe Lovano, Allen Farnham, Carly Simon, Betty Buckley, Rabih Abou-Khalil, Simon Shaheen, Marbin, Trichy Sankaran, Osvaldo Golijov, Nguyên Lê, Badi Assad, Steve Shehan, Esperanza Spalding, Elliot Goldenthal, Sergio and Odair Assad, Daniel Schnyder, Nancy Wilson, the Wayfaring Strangers, Steve Gadd, and Laszlo Gardony. He appears on more than 225 audio recordings and movie soundtracks.

Haddad was a full-time professor at the Berklee College of Music from 1992 to 2010. Since 2011, he is currently a full-time professor of "Performance and Improvisation" and of percussion studies at the Oberlin Conservatory of Music. He was made a faculty member at the Cleveland Institute of Music in 2005.

== Discography ==
With Joanne Brackeen

- Pink Elephant Magic (Arkadia Jazz, 1998)

With Badi Assad

- Echoes of Brazil (Chesky Records, 1997)

With Lenny White and Mark Sherman,

- Explorations in Space and Time (Chesky, 2013)

With Herbie Hancock and Paul Simon,

- Possibilities (Hear Music and Vector Recordings, 2005)
