= Arooj Aftab =

Pakistani-American singer

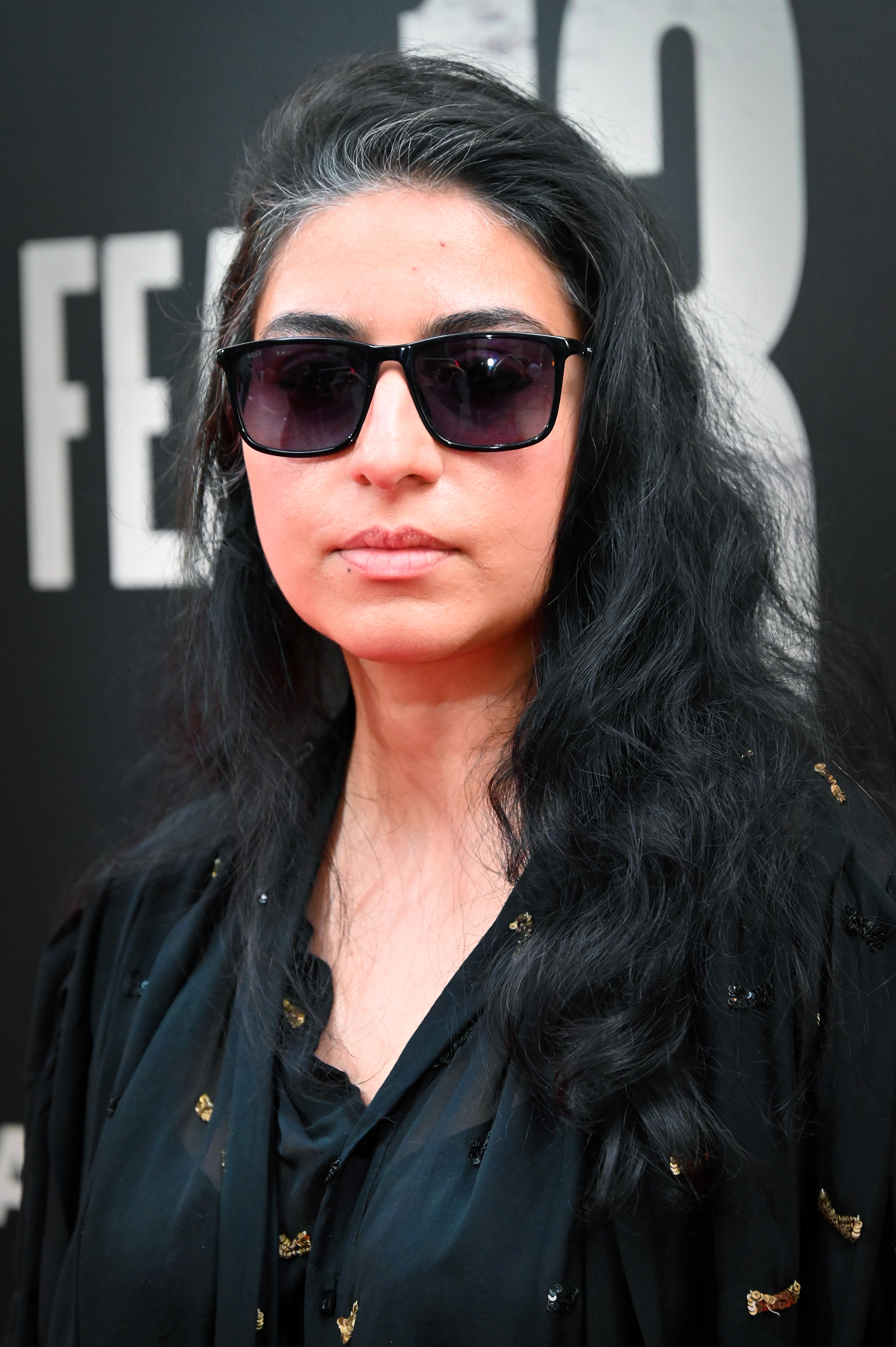
- Aftab in 2026

Background information
- Born: 1985 or 1986 (age 39–40); Riyadh, Saudi Arabia
- Origin: Lahore, Pakistan
- Genre: Jazz
- Occupations: Composer; singer; producer; editor
- Labels: New Amsterdam, Verve Records
- Website: aroojaftab.com

Arooj Aftab PP (Urdu: عروج آفتاب, born 1985 or 1986) is a Pakistani and American singer, composer, and producer.

Aftab was nominated for the Best New Artist award and won the Best Global Music Performance award for her song "Mohabbat" at the 64th Annual Grammy Awards in April 2022. She became the first-ever Pakistani artist to win a Grammy Award.

On the 75th independence day of Pakistan, then President Arif Alvi awarded Aftab the Pride of Performance Award, Pakistan's most prestigious award, for excellence in the field of art and music.

== Early life and education ==
Aftab was born to expatriate Pakistani parents in Riyadh, Saudi Arabia. When she was about 10 years old, they returned to their native Lahore in Pakistan. She taught herself the guitar and gradually acquired her singing style while listening to Billie Holiday, Hariprasad Chaurasia, Mariah Carey, and Begum Akhtar. At that time, Aftab lived in a country where access to Western online platforms was difficult, and the infrastructure for independent music was lacking. In this context, however, she promoted her music in Pakistan, being one of the first musicians to use the Internet in the early 2000s; her renditions of "Mera Pyaar" and "Hallelujah" went viral and launched the Pakistani indie scene.

Aftab moved to the United States at the age of 19 in 2005 and earned a degree in music production and engineering at Boston's Berklee College of Music. She moved to New York in 2010 and began working as an editor and scoring films. Since her graduation in 2010, Aftab has lived there, being part of the city's jazz and "new music" scene.

== Career ==
In April 2011, Aftab was included in the "100 Composers Under 40" selection launched by NPR and WQXR-FM's Q2 (a contemporary classical music internet radio station).

Aftab's first album, Bird Under Water, was released independently in 2014. It received critical acclaim from David Honigmann of the Financial Times, who gave the album four out of five stars in March 2015.

She worked as an editor on the documentary Armed With Faith (2017), winning a 2018 Emmy Award afterward.

Her second album, Siren Islands, was released on June 12, 2018, through New Amsterdam Records. NPR included the album in their "Favorite Electronic and Dance Music of 2018" list. The New York Times listed the song "Island No. 2", which represented the album, in their "25 Best Classical Music Tracks of 2018" list. In mid-July 2018, the song "Lullaby", taken from Bird Under Water, was ranked number 150 on the NPR's "200 Greatest Songs By 21st Century Women" list.

In 2020, Aftab sang, among other vocalists, on Residente's Latin Grammy Award-winning single "Antes Que El Mundo Se Acabe". That year, she composed the music for the Student Academy Award-winning film Bittu (narrative category) by Karishma Dube.

An anticipated release, Aftab's third studio album, Vulture Prince, was released on April 23, 2021, via New Amsterdam Records. Thematically, the album discusses stories of people, relationships, and lost moments and is dedicated to the memory of her younger brother, Maher. Vulture Prince received praise from publications such as Pitchfork, NPR, and the Al Jazeera English-language news channel. Barack Obama selected the song "Mohabbat" from the album as one of his summer playlist favorites for 2021. "Mohabbat" was called one of the best songs of 2021 by Time and The New York Times. Vulture Prince was named the best album of 2021 by Netherlands newspaper de Volkskrant, topping their year-end list. Brenna Ehrlich ranked the album sixth on Rolling Stone's "Best Music of 2021" staff list. It was ranked number twenty by The Guardian on their list of the "50 best albums of 2021", and Laura Snapes named Aftab "[t]he year's biggest musical revelation". While Vulture Prince did not rank on the Los Angeles Times' top ten "Best Albums of 2021", it was, however, included on their "15 deserving albums" list. In late 2021, Aftab signed with Verve Records.

Aftab won a Grammy in 2022 for her song "Mohabbat". In 2023 she became the first Pakistani artist to perform at the Grammys ceremony.

She collaborated with British producer Bonobo on the song "Fire in the Water" in 2026.

=== Performances ===
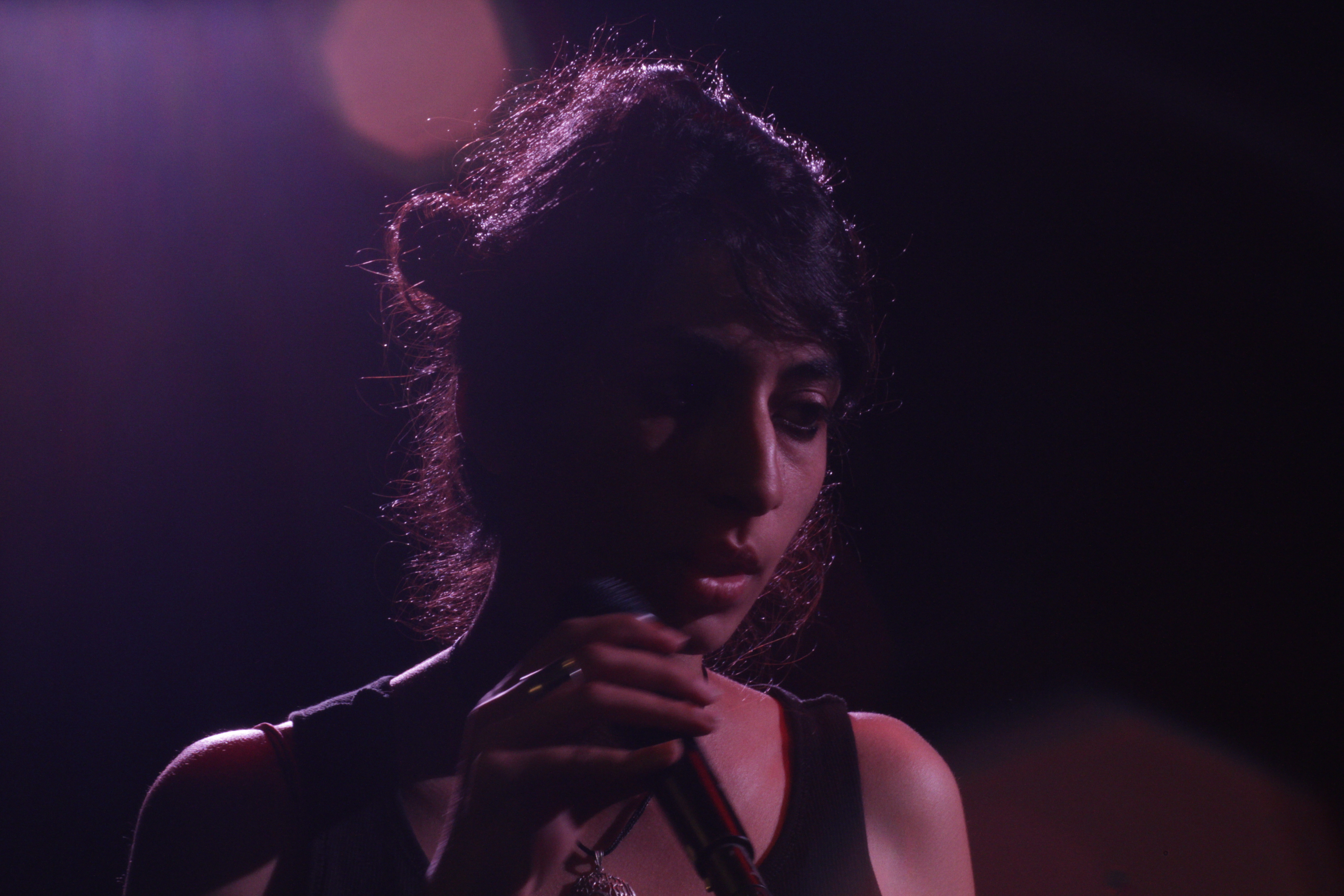
Aftab performing at (Le) Poisson Rouge in New York, 2014; the photo was used as the cover for her album Vulture Prince

Aftab has performed at notable music venues such as the Barbican, the Chan Centre, the Lincoln Center, the Andy Warhol Museum, Haus der Kulturen der Welt, The Kitchen, (Le) Poisson Rouge, and the Museum of Modern Art.

She has also performed at international music festivals such as Coachella, Glastonbury, Primavera Sound Barcelona, Roskilde Festival, Big Ears Festival, The Ecstatic Music Festival, the San Francisco Jazz Festival, Montreal Jazz Festival, Pitchfork Music Festival and the Newport Folk Festival. In 2018 she opened for Mitski at The Brooklyn Steel.

In 2022, Aftab performed at the Metropolitan Museum of Arts's Temple of Dendur, and at The Broad's 2022 Summer Happenings series.

In May 2024, Aftab was announced as one of the curators for the Dutch music festival Le Guess Who?, set for November 7–10. Aftab's lineup will include performances by herself, her father, Aja Monet, Dina El Wedidi, Meshell Ndegeocello, Noura Mint Seymali, and Zsela.

In 2026, Aftab contributed a track to the compilation album Help (2) in support of War Child to raise funds for humanitarian and medical aid efforts in war-torn territories. In their review for Variety, Jem Aswad cited Aftab and Beck's cover of the Broadway song "Lilac Wine" as a highlight.

== Musical style and influences ==
Aftab's music has been described as a blend of jazz fusion, jazz, electronica, neo-Sufi, folk, Hindustani classical, classical music, indie pop, minimalism, and acoustic music. Aftab told the Los Angeles Times that she had aspired that Vulture Prince would "transcend boundaries". Aftab possesses an alto vocal range.

She has mentioned Abbey Lincoln, Abida Parveen, Anoushka Shankar, Begum Akhtar, Esperanza Spalding, Jeff Buckley, Julius Eastman, Meshell Ndegeocello, Morton Feldman, and Terry Riley as her influences. Aftab also expressed her admiration for Billie Eilish. Lyrically, Aftab has cited Asian poets as influences such as Rumi, Mirza Ghalib, and Hafeez Hoshiarpuri and uses Urdu Ghazal. Her vocals have been described as "meditative". Vulture Prince revolves around themes of grief and longing.

== Personal life ==
In October 2023, Aftab signed the Artists4Ceasefire open letter to Joe Biden, President of the United States, calling for a ceasefire of the Israeli bombardment of Gaza and for a release of Israeli hostages.

In 2023 she paired with Pakistani animal rights organization, the Ayesha Chundrigar Foundation to raise funds for their continued animal rescue efforts in Karachi.

In 2022 she spoke at Global Citizens' Women of Influence panel on The Power of Gender in Shaping Culture alongside Gayle King, Pharrell Williams and Gloria Steinem.

In 2024 Aftab once again joined the Global Citizen action platform dedicated to achieving the end of extreme poverty, performing her song "Diya Hai" from her 2022 album Vulture Prince.

== Discography ==
=== Solo albums ===
- Bird Under Water (2014)
- Siren Islands (2018)
- Vulture Prince (2021)
- Night Reign (2024)

=== Collaborative albums ===
- Love in Exile (2023, with Vijay Iyer and Shahzad Ismaily)

=== Other works ===
- Music director for the film Without Shepherds by Cary McClelland (2013)
- Composed and sang on the album The Julius Eastman Memory Depot by Jace Clayton (2013)
- Sang the title song Insaaf for the film Talvar, written by Gulzar and composed by Vishal Bhardwaj (2015)
- Sang an old traditional Bandish of Raag Bhairavi Raske Bhare Tore Nain for the film Dobara Phir Se by Mehreen Jabbar (2016)
- Composed and sang the song De Libbe with Daso for Tale and Tone Records (2017)
- Featured singer on Climbing Poetree's album Intrinsic (2017)
- Composer, Sound Designer and Implementer for Tails Noir by Eggnut Games (2021)
- Sang Mehram with Asfar Hussain for Coke Studio (2022)

== Awards and nominations ==
Awards and nominations for Arooj Aftab
Award	Year	Category	Recipient(s)	Status	Ref.
News & Documentary Emmy Awards	2018	Outstanding Politics and Government Documentary	Armed With Faith	Won	
Folk Alliance International Best of 2021 Awards	2021	Artist of the Year	Herself	Nominated	
Pride of Performance	2022	Arts (singing)	Herself	Won	
Songlines Music Awards	2022	Fusion	Herself	Nominated	
Edison Jazz Awards	2023	Global	Love In Exile (with Vijay Iyer & Shahazad Ismaily)	Won	
Grammy Awards	2022	Best New Artist	Herself	Nominated	
Grammy Awards	2022	Best Global Music Performance	"Mohabbat"	Won	
Grammy Awards	2023	Best Global Music Performance	"Udhero Na" with Anoushka Shankar	Nominated	
Grammy Awards	2024	Best Global Music Performance	"Shadow Forces" (with Vijay Iyer & Shahazad Ismaily)	Nominated	
Grammy Awards	2024	Best Alternative Jazz Album	Love in Exile (with Vijay Iyer & Shahazad Ismaily)	Nominated	
Grammy Awards	2025	Best Alternative Jazz Album	Night Reign	Nominated	
Grammy Awards	2025	Best Global Music Performance	"Raat Ki Rani"	Nominated	
