= Grammy Award for Best Global Music Performance =

Honor presented to recording artists

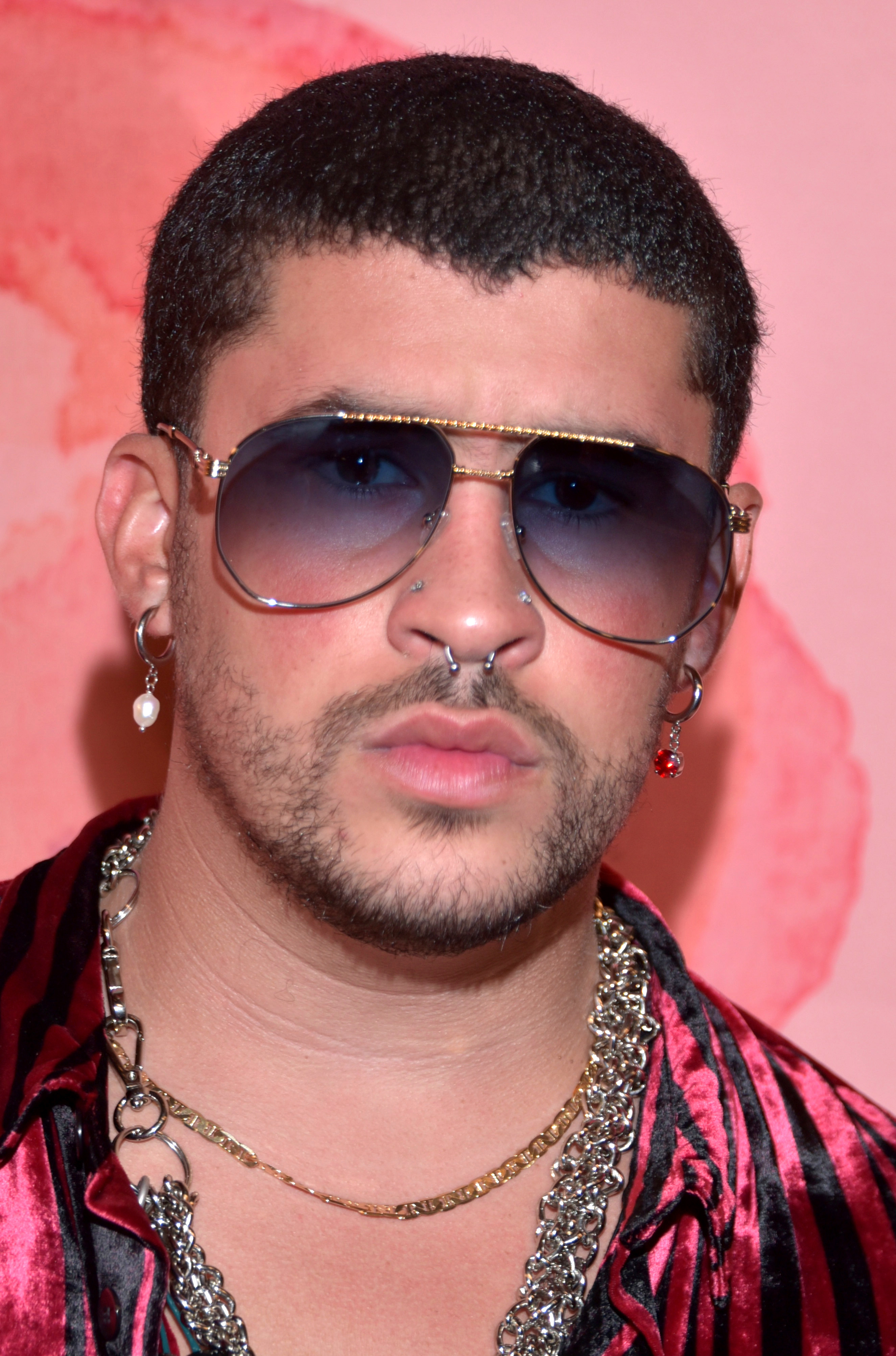
- "Eoo" by Bad Bunny is the most recent recipient
- Awarded for: Influential music from around the globe
- Country: United States
- Presented by: National Academy of Recording Arts and Sciences
- First award: 2022
- Currently held by: Bad Bunny – "Eoo" (2026)
- Website: grammy.com

The Grammy Award for Best Global Music Performance is an honor presented to recording artists for influential music from around the globe at the Grammy Awards, a ceremony that was established in 1958 and originally called the Gramophone Awards. Honors in several categories are presented at the ceremony annually by the National Academy of Recording Arts and Sciences of the United States to "honor artistic achievement, technical proficiency and overall excellence in the recording industry, without regard to album sales or chart position".

== History ==
The award for Best Global Music Performance, reserved for international performers exhibiting "non-European, indigenous traditions", was first presented at the 64th Annual Grammy Awards, held on January 31, 2022. The new award category is an addition to the Global Music field, which also includes the Best Global Music Album category which was introduced in 1992 as Best World Music Album. (In 2020, its name was changed to Best Global Music Album)

Beginning with the 66th Annual Grammy Awards in 2024, a sister category, Best African Music Performance, was established to specifically honor the work of African artists.

== Recipients ==
=== 2020s ===
Year	Artist	Work
2022
2022	Arooj Aftab	"Mohabbat"
2022	Angélique Kidjo and Burna Boy	"Do Yourself"
2022	Femi Kuti	"Pà Pá Pà"
2022	Yo-Yo Ma and Angélique Kidjo	"Blewu"
2022	Wizkid featuring Tems	"Essence"
2023
2023	Wouter Kellerman, Zakes Bantwini and Nomcebo Zikode	"Bayethe"
2023	Arooj Aftab featuring Anoushka Shankar	"Udhero Na"
2023	Matt B featuring Eddy Kenzo	"Gimme Love"
2023	Burna Boy	"Last Last"
2023	Rocky Dawuni featuring Blck H3ro	"Neva Bow Down"
2024
2024	Béla Fleck, Edgar Meyer and Zakir Hussain featuring Rakesh Chaurasia	"Pashto"
2024	Arooj Aftab, Vijay Iyer and Shahzad Ismaily	"Shadow Forces"
2024	Burna Boy	"Alone"
2024	Davido	"Feel"
2024	Silvana Estrada	"Milagro y Desastre"
2024	Falu and Gaurav Shah featuring PM Narendra Modi	"Abundance in Millets"
2024	Ibrahim Maalouf featuring Cimafunk and Tank and the Bangas	"Todo Colores"
2025
2025	Sheila E. featuring Gloria Estefan and Mimy Succar	"Bemba Colorá"
2025	Arooj Aftab	"Raat Ki Rani"
2025	Jacob Collier featuring Anoushka Shankar and Varijashree Venugopal	"A Rock Somewhere"
2025	Rocky Dawuni	"Rise"
2025	Angélique Kidjo featuring Soweto Gospel Choir	"Sunlight to My Soul"
2025	Masa Takumi featuring Ron Korb, Noshir Mody and Dale Edward Chung	"Kashira"
2026
2026	Bad Bunny	"Eoo"
2026	Ciro Hurtado	"Cantando en el Camino"
2026	Angélique Kidjo	"Jerusalema"
2026	Yeisy Rojas	"Inmigrante y Que?"
2026	Shakti	"Shrini's Dream (Live)"
2026	Anoushka Shankar featuring Alam Khan and Sarathy Korwar	"Daybreak"
2027
2027	Devan Ekambaram featuring Susha	"Varuvaaiy"
2027	KerreKe, Mireya and Alex E. Chávez	"Una Flor en Cada Estrella"
2027	Angélique Kidjo featuring Pharrell Williams and Quavo	"Bando [Orchestral]"
2027	Rosalía featuring Dougie F	"Porcelana"
2027	Shakira and Burna Boy	"Dai Dai"

^{^[I]} Each year is linked to the article about the Grammy Awards held that year.

== Artists with multiple nominations ==
5 nominations

- Angélique Kidjo

4 nominations

- Arooj Aftab
- Burna Boy

3 nominations

- Anoushka Shankar

2 nominations

- Rocky Dawuni

== See also ==
- Awards for world music
- List of cultural and regional genres of music
- List of Grammy Award categories
