= Miya Masaoka =

American composer, musician and sound artist (born 1958)

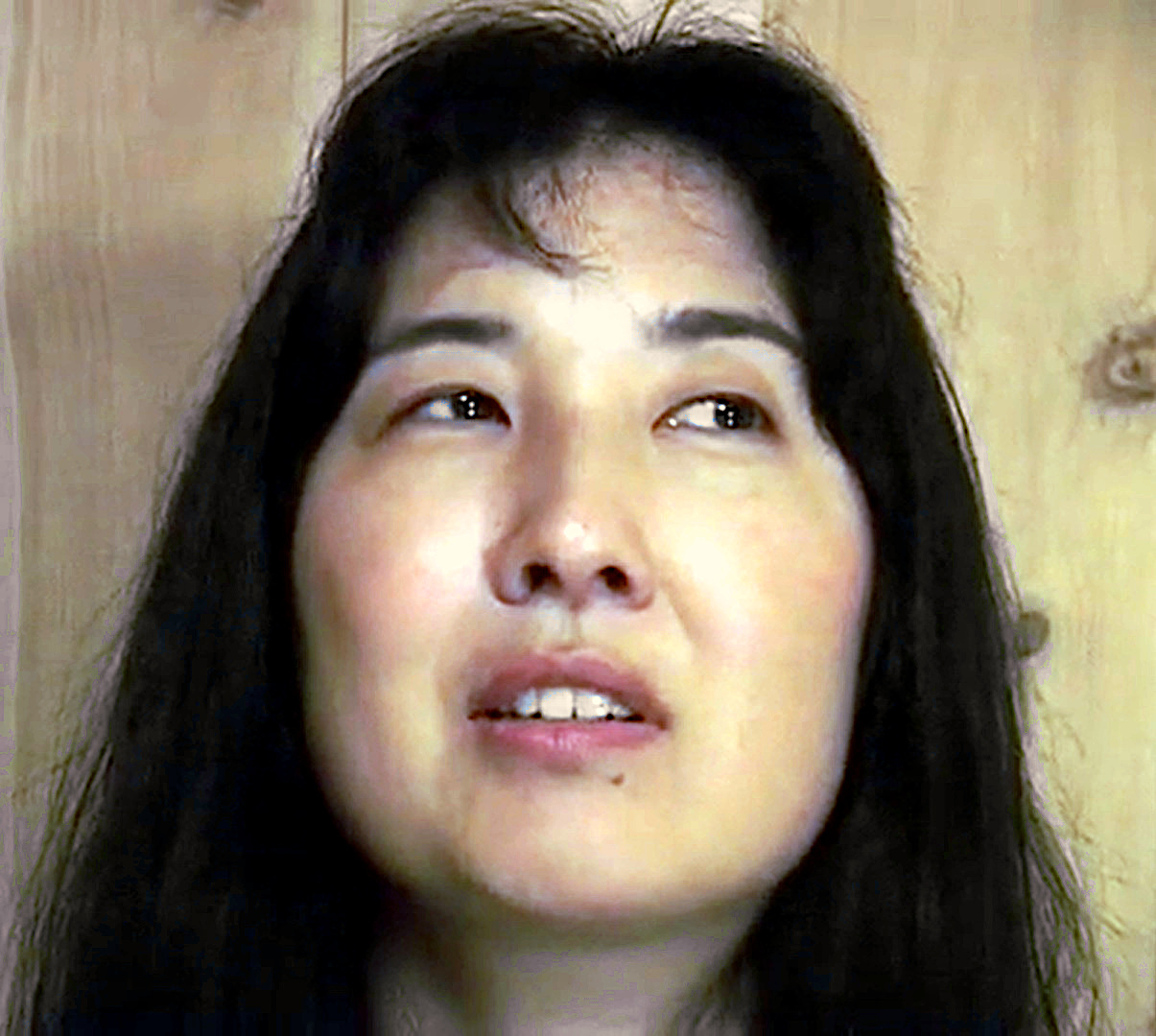
- Masaoka (c. 2003)
- Born: 1958 (age 67–68); Washington, D.C., U.S.
- Education: San Francisco State University, Mills College
- Known for: Sound art, musical composition

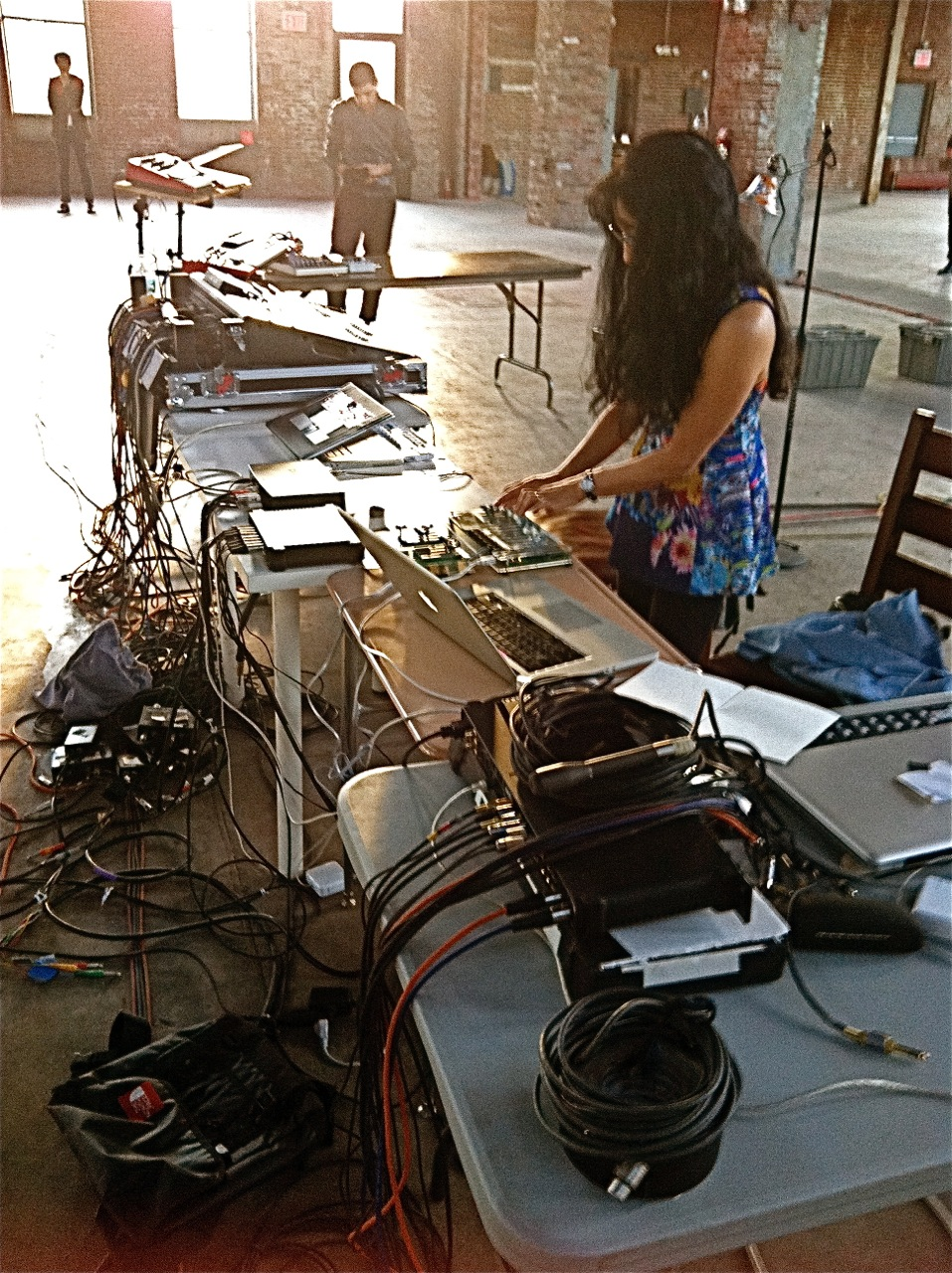
Masaoka performing in 2016

Miya Masaoka (born 1958, Washington, D.C.) is an American composer, musician, and sound artist active in the field of contemporary classical music and experimental music. Her work encompasses contemporary classical composition, improvisation, electroacoustic music, inter-disciplinary sound art, sound installation, traditional Japanese instruments, and performance art. She is based in New York City.

Masaoka often performs on a 21-string Japanese koto (musical instrument), which she extends with software processing, string preparations, and bowing. She has created performance works and installations incorporating plants, live insects, and sensor technology. Her full-length ballet was performed at the Venice Biennale 2004. She has been awarded the John Simon Guggenheim Memorial Fellowship (2021), the Doris Duke Award (2013) and the Herb Alpert Award (2004), and a Fulbright Fellowship for advanced research for Noh, gagaku and the ichi gen kin. She is an associate professor in the MFA Visual Arts Department at Columbia University, and the director of the MFA Sound Art Program.

== Early life and education ==
Masaoka began studying classical music at eight years old. In her early 20s, she moved to Paris, France, and upon returning to the US, she enrolled at San Francisco State University, and received her BA in Music, magna cum laude, where she studied with Wayne Peterson and Eric Moe. She holds an MA from Mills College where she received the Faculty Award in Music Composition. Her teachers included Alvin Curran, Maryanne Amacher and David Tudor.

== Biography ==
Masaoka's work spans many genres and media. She has created works for voice, orchestra, installations, electronics and film shorts. She has sewn and soldered handmade responsive garments (LED KIMONO) and mapped the movement of insects and response of plants and brain activity to sound (Pieces For Plants, The Sound of Naked Men, Thinking Sounds).

Her works have been commissioned and premiered by Bang on a Can, So Percussion, Either/Or, Kathleen Supove, Joan Jeanrenaud, SF Sound, Volti, Rova Saxophone Quartet, Alonzo King’s Ballet, The Del Sol String Quartet and others. Her orchestral work “Other Mountain” was selected for a reading by JCOI Earshot for the La Jolla Symphony 2013.

She founded and directed the San Francisco Gagaku Society (1989-1996) under the tutelage of Master Suenobu Togi, a former Japanese Imperial Court musician who traced his gagaku lineage more than 1000 years to the Tang Dynasty.

Her love of nature and resonant outdoor space led her to record the migrating birds in the deep and naturally resonant canyons near the San Diego Airport, resulting in the work “For Birds, Planes and Cello,” written for Joan Jeanrenaud, formerly of Kronos Quartet. “While I Was Walking, I Heard a Sound” is scored for 120 singers, spatialized in balconies of the concert hall. During one movement, three choirs and nine opera singers are making bird calls and environmental sounds.

As a kotoist, she remains active in improvisation and has performed and recorded with Pharoah Sanders, Pauline Oliveros, Gerry Hemingway, Jon Rose, Fred Frith, Larry Ochs and Maybe Monday, Steve Coleman, Anthony Braxton, Reggie Workman, Dr. L. Subramaniam, Andrew Cyrille, George E. Lewis, Jin Hi Kim, Susie Ibarra, Vijay Iyer, Myra Melford, Zeena Parkins, Toshiko Akiyoshi, William Parker, Robert Dick, Lukas Ligeti, Earl Howard, Henry Brant and many others.

Masaoka describes herself, saying, “I am deeply moved by the sounds and kinetic energy of the natural world. People, history, memory, this geography and soundscape of nature and culture --from our human heart beat to the rhythms of the moon and oceans-- how infinitely complex yet so fundamental.”

She initiated and founded the San Francisco Electronic Music Festival in 1999.

In 2004, Masaoka received an Alpert Award in the Arts, and she previously was given a National Endowment for the Arts and a Wallace Alexander Gerbode Award.

The New York Times describes her solo performances as “exploring the extremes of her instrument,” and The Wire describes her own compositions as “magnificent…virtuosic…essential music…”

She has been a faculty member at the Milton Avery Graduate Program at Bard College in Music/Sound since 2002, and has taught music composition at NYU. She received the Doris Duke Performing Artist Award in 2013, and a Fulbright Scholarship for Japan, 2016.

== Works ==
- Symphony orchestra
  - Other Mountain (2013)
- Creative Orchestra
  - What is the Difference Between Stripping and Playing the Violin? (2 vlns, elec. bass, acoustic bass, elec. gtr, Asian instruments, turntable, electronics, saxophones, 2 drummers) (1997)
  - Off a Craggy Cliff, 2 large telematic ensembles (non-specific instrumentation) (2009)
  - Jagged Pyramid, large ensemble (non-specific instrumentation) (2009)
- Choral works
  - While I Was Walking, I Heard a Sound…” 3 a cappella choirs, 9 soloists (2003)
- Large ensemble: 7 or more players
  - Twenty Four Thousand Years is Forever, chamber orchestra and tape; 2 shengs, 2 saxophones, clarinet, percussion, 2 violins, cello, bass, koto (1997)
  - Dark Passages, a multi media oratorio, readers, string quartet, Buddhist chanters, actors, projected slides, video (1998)
  - It Creeps Along, clarinet, cello, guitar, percussion, bass, piano, Laser Koto (gestural controller) (2000)
  - What is the Sound of Naked Asian Men?, 8 musicians and streaming brain wave data, video projection (2001)
  - Chironomy, 5 players in 2 groups. clarinet, vocalist, synthesizer in group 1, 2 computers in Group 2, streaming audio and projected video of children's hands gesturing (2006)
  - Pieces for Plants, plants, EEG sensors, computer, (plant with sensors on leaves; data response is interpreted through sound (2007)
  - The Long Road, string quartet, percussion, koto, analog modular synthesis (2013)
- Works for 2-6 players
  - Spirit of Goze, taiko, piano, koto (1990)
  - Ancient Art, tabla, flute, cello, 13 str koto (1991)
  - For Sho, Bassoon and Koto (1994)
  - The Wanderer and the Firefly; five hichi ricki and snare drum (1994)
  - Butterfly Logic, 4 percussionists, amplified metal percussion (2008)
  - LED Kimono, electronics, reader, dancer, custom designed and built responsive wearable electronics (2009)
  - Swimming Through Madness, duo 13 str. kotos (2010)
  - Warsaw, violin, cello, 2 vocalists, video projections, koto (2011)
  - Stemming, 1-4 players. Tuning forks, multi channel speakers (2011)
  - The Dust and the Noise, piano, percussion, violin, cello (2013)
  - Survival, string quartet (2013)
  - The Clattering of Life, string quartet and improvising trio (2013)
  - Tilt, string quartet #2 (2015)
- Solo
  - Topaz Refractions, 21 str koto (1990)
  - Unearthed/Unbound, 21 str koto (1992)
  - Tripped, clarinet (1994)
  - Ritual for Giant Hissing Madagascar Cockroaches, performer, laser beams, interactive software, cockroaches. (Roaches’ movement interrupts sensors triggering audio samples of their hissing sounds) (1995-98)
  - Three Sounds of Tea, koto and electronics (1998)
  - Bee Project #1, koto, violin, percussion and live, amplified bees projected video (1996)
  - Music For Mouths, 4 saxophones (1999)
  - For Birds, Planes and Cello, cello, field recording (tape) (2004)
  - Things in an Open Field, Laser Koto and electronics (2006)
  - Balls, piano, Disclavier, ping-pong balls (2007)
  - A Crack in Your Thoughts, koto and electronics (2012)
  - Untitled, Bass solo (2015)
- For dance
  - Clytemnestra, solo koto with metal, paper preparations (1993)
  - Koto, a full-length ballet, koto and tape (2004)
- Installations/Exhibitions
  - The Black Room, collaboration with poet Richard Oyama…(1988)
  - Koto in the Sky, Interactive installation, with lasers beamed across two buildings over an alley triggered with broomsticks from fire escapes (2000)
  - Pieces for Plants #5, an interactive sound installation for houseplant, electrodes, computer and audience interaction (2001)
  - Inner Koto, Multi Channel sound installation, The Kitchen, NYC, The Winter Olympics, Torino, Italy (group show) (2005-7)
  - Between Thought and Sound: Graphic Notation in Contemporary Art, Group Show (2007)
  - Minetta Creek, Judson Church, NYC, multi-channel sound (2008)
  - Partials of Sound, of Light, Multi channel sound installation (2013–14)

== Discography ==
- Portrait recordings
  - Compositions Improvisations (1994, Asian Improv Records) (debut solo CD with James Newton, Frank Holder)
  - Monk's Japanese Folksong (1998, Dizim) (Miya Masaoka Trio with Andrew Cyrille, Reggie Workman)
  - What is the Difference Between Stripping and Playing the Violin? (1998, Victo) The Masaoka Orchestra, Masaoka conducts; Kei Yamashita, Jeff Lukas, Lee Yen, Carla Kihlstedt, Liberty Ellman, India Cooke, Francis Wong, Hafez Hadirzadeh, Toyoji Tomita, Robbie Kauker, Sciobhan Brooks, Glen Horiuchi, Vijay Iyer, George E. Lewis, Trevor Dunn, Mark Izu, Liu Qi Chao, Anthony Brown, Elliot Humberto Kavee, Thomas Day, Patty Liu, DJ Mariko + others
  - For Birds, Planes and Cello (2004, Solitary B) Composed by Masaoka for Joan Jeanrenaud
  - While I Was Walking, I Heard a Sound… (2004, Solitary B) (for three a cappella choirs and 9 soloists spatialized in balconies with 120 singers, Volti, San Francisco Choral Society, Piedmont Eastbay Children's Choir) Amy X Neuburg, Randall Wong + others
- Collaborations
  - Crepuscular Music (1996, Rastascan) (as a trio with Gino Robair, Tom Nunn)
  - Séance (1996, VEX) (as a trio with Henry Kaiser, Danielle DeGruttola)
  - Sliding (1998, Noise Asia) (duets with Jon Rose)
  - The Usual Turmoil (1998, Music and Arts) (duets with George E. Lewis)
  - Guerrilla Mosaics (1999, 482 Music) (as a trio with John Butcher, Gino Robair)
  - Saturn's Finger (1999, Buzz Records) (as a trio with Fred Frith, Larry Ochs)
  - Digital Wildlife (2000, Winter + Winter) (as a trio with Fred Frith Larry Ochs)
  - Illuminations (2003, Rastascan Records) (as a trio with Peter Kowald, Gino Robair)
  - Klang. Farbe. Melodie (2004, 482 Music) (as a quartet with Biggi Vinkeloe, George Cremaschi, Gino Robair)
  - Fly, Fly, Fly (2004, Intakt Records) (as a trio with Larry Ochs, Joan Jeanrenaud)
  - Unsquare (Intakt 2008) Maybe Monday: Fred Frith, Larry Ochs, Carla Kihlstedt, Zeena Parkins, Ikue Mori and Gerry Hemingway
  - Duets with Accordion and Koto (2008, Deep Listening) (duets with Pauline Oliveros)
  - Spiller Alley (2008, RogueArt) (as a trio with Larry Ochs, Peggy Lee)
  - Masaoka, Audrey Chen, Kenta Nagai, Hans Grusel(2009, Resipiscent)
  - Humeurs (2013, RogueArt) (As the quartet East West Collective with Didier Petit, Sylvain Kasaap, Larry Ochs, Xu Fengxia)

== As a performer ==
- With Steve Coleman

Myths, Modes and Means, Mystic Rhythm Society (BMG/RCA 1996)

- With Lisle Ellis

What We Live (Black Saint 1996)

- With Toshiko Akiyoshi

Suite for Koto and Jazz Orchestra (BMG, 1997. The work was composed for Miya Masaoka)

- With Ben Goldberg

Twelve Minor (Avant 1998)

- With Dr. L. Subramaniam

Global Fusion (Erato 1999)

- With John Ingle, Dan Joseph

Trancepatterns (Dendroica Music 2000)

- With Christian Wolff

Burdocks (Tzadik 2001)

- With Glen Horiuchi

Legends and Legacies (Asian Improv Records 2005)

- With Alex Cline

Cloud Plate (Cryptogramophone 2005)

- With George Lewis

Sequel (for Lester Bowie) (Intakt), 2006)

- With David Toop

Sound Body (samadhisound 2007)

- With Earl Howard, Granular Modality (2012, New World Records)"

== In compilation ==
- Tom Djll; Tribute to Sun Ra, Rastascan 1995
- Radim Zenkl; Strings and Wings, Shanachie 1996
- Sounds Like1996: Music By Asian American Artists, Innocent Eyes + Lenses. 1996
- Halleluia Anyway: Tribute to Tom Cora. Tzadik 1999
- Azadi! RAWA, Fire Museum + Electro Motive Records 2000
- President’s Breakfast III C. Disc Lexia Records 2001
- soundCd no. 1, San Pedro Schindler House. Curated by Cindy Bernard, SASSAS 2001
- Music Overheard. Institute of Contemporary Art, Boston, Curated by Bhob Rainey and Kenneth Goldsmith. Excerpt of “Ritual,” 2006

With Fred Frith and Maybe Monday

- Digital Wildlife (Winter & Winter, 2002)
- Unsquare (Intakt, 2008)

== Films ==
- 1999 – L. Subramaniam: Violin From the Heart. Directed by Jean Henri Meunier. (Includes a scene with Masaoka performing with L. Subramaniam.)
- 2010 – The Reach of Resonance. Directed by Steve Elkins.

== See also ==
- Koto

== Bibliography ==
- Zorn, John, ed. (2000). Arcana: Musicians on Music. New York: Granary Books/Hips Road. ISBN 1-887123-27-X.
- Garrett, Charles Hiroshi, ed. (2013). The Grove Dictionary of American Music (Miya Masaoka). Oxford University Press. ISBN 9780195314281.
- Buzzarte, Monique, ed., Bickley, Tom, ed (2012). Anthology of Essays on Deep Listening. Deep Listening Institute. ISBN 1889471186, ISBN 978-1889471181. p 65
- Sewell, Stacey, (2009). Making My Skin Crawl: Representations and Mediations of the Body in Miya Masaoka’s Ritual, Interspecies Collaboration with Giant Madagascar Hissing Cockroaches. Radical Musicology, Vol. 4. ISSN 1751-7788
- Oteri, Frank J., (June 1, 2014). Miya Masaoka: Social and Sonic Relationships. NewMusicBox (a publication of New Music USA)
