= Shahzad Ismaily =

American bass guitarist (born 1972)

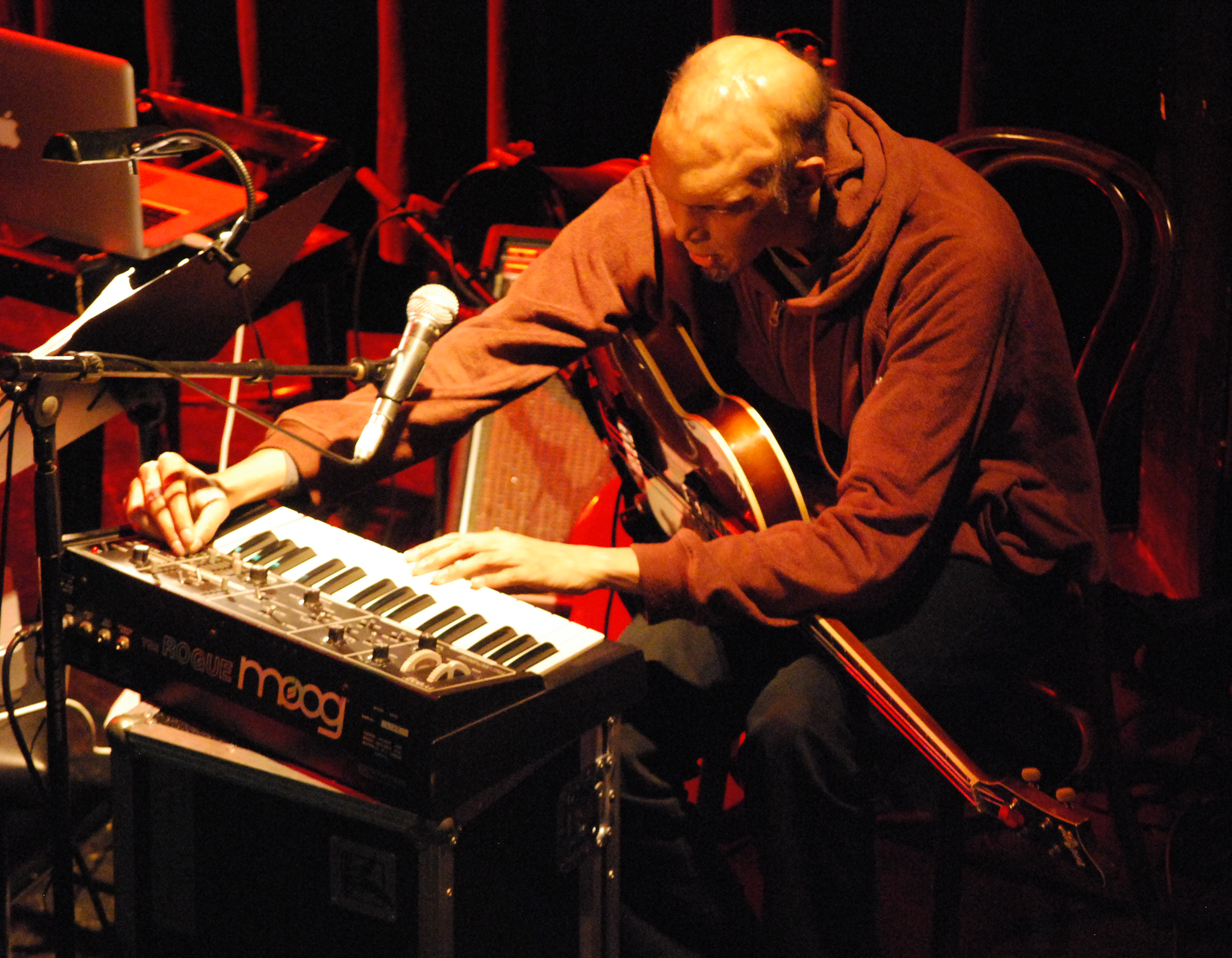
- Shahzad Ismaily (2009)

Background information
- Born: June 20, 1972 (age 54); Pennsylvania, U.S.
- Occupations: Musician; record producer
- Instruments: Bass guitar; guitar; drums; percussion; synthesizer
- Member of: Ceramic Dog; Secret Chiefs 3; Cosa Brava

Shahzad Ismaily (born 20 June 1972 in Pennsylvania) is an American multi-instrumentalist, known mainly as a bass guitar player, and record producer. He is a member of Marc Ribot's trio Ceramic Dog since its formation in 2006. He also plays with Secret Chiefs 3 and Cosa Brava.

He is of Pakistani origin.

In 2009, he composed music for the documentary film William Kunstler: Disturbing the Universe.

In 2012, he played banjo and electric guitar while appearing in Ragnar Kjartansson's installation film The Visitors. He was invited to join the otherwise all Icelandic cast by then-partner Gyða Valtýsdóttir.

In 2019, he released the album Dreams of Sleep and Wakes of Sound in collaboration with Laraaji and Merz.

He is featured in the 2021 Bob Dylan concert film Shadow Kingdom: The Early Songs of Bob Dylan.

His 2023 album Love in Exile, made in collaboration with Arooj Aftab and Vijay Iyer, was nominated for the Grammy Award for Best Alternative Jazz Album. He also contributed to Aftab's albums Vulture Prince and Night Reign, released in 2021 and 2024 respectively.

As a producer, he worked with Jolie Holland on her 2008 album The Living and the Dead. He also produced one song from The Following Mountain by Sam Amidon. In 2022, he produced several songs from Cass McCombs's Heartmind album.

== Discography (partial) ==
Shahzad Ismaily has played on almost 400 records.

With Arooj Aftab and Vijay Iyer

- Love in Exile (2023)

With Arooj Aftab

- Vulture Prince (2021)
- Night Reign (2024)

With Jolie Holland

- The Living and the Dead (2008)

With Mike Doughty

- Haughty Melodic (2005)

With Ceramic Dog

- Party Intellectuals (2008)
- Your Turn (2013)
- YRU Still Here? (2018)
- What I Did on My Long Vacation (2020)
- Hope (2021)
- Connection (2023)

With Secret Chiefs 3

- Book of Horizons (2004)
- Xaphan: Book of Angels Volume 9 (2008)
- Le Mani Destre Recise Degli Ultimi Uomini (2009)
- Satellite Supersonic Vol. 1 (2010)
- Book of Souls: Folio A (2013)
- Perichoresis (2014)

With Cosa Brava

- The Letter (2012)
- Z Sides (2024)

With Yasmine Hamdan

- Al Jamilat (2017)

With Corin Curschellas

- Grischunit (2008)

With Susanna Wallumrød

- Wild Dog (2012)

With Laura Veirs

- Found Light (2022)

With Cass McCombs

- Heartmind (2022)

With Josephine Foster

- Faithful Fairy Harmony (2018)

With Moses Sumney

- Græ (2020)

With the Plastic Ono Band

- Between My Head and the Sky (2009)
- Take Me to the Land of Hell (2013)

With Sam Amidon

- I See the Sign (2010)
- Bright Sunny South (2013)
- Lily-O (2014)
- The Following Mountain (2017)

With Ólöf Arnalds

- Innundir skinni (2010)

With Sean Hayes

- Flowering Spade (2007)

With Aram Bajakian

- There Were Flowers Also in Hell (2014)

With Death in Vegas

- Trans-Love Energies (2011)

With Bonnie "Prince" Billy

- Lie Down in the Light (2008)
- The Wonder Show of the World (2010)
- Wolfroy Goes to Town (2011)

With Eyvind Kang

- The Yelm Sessions (2007)
- Alastor: Book of Angels Volume 21 (2014)

With Owen Pallett

- A Swedish Love Story EP (2010)

With Feist

- Multitudes (2023)

With Laurie Anderson

- Homeland (2010)

With Nick Mulvey

- First Mind (2014)

With Tomberlin

- I Don't Know Who Needs to Hear This... (2022)

With Anna von Hausswolff

- Dead Magic (2018)

With Damien Rice

- My Favourite Faded Fantasy (2014)

With Maya Hawke

- Chaos Angel (2024)

With Cassandra Jenkins

- My Light, My Destroyer (2024)
