= Bright Sunny South =

Studio album by Sam Amidon
- Released: May 14, 2013
- Studios: Snap Recording Studios and Livingston Studios, London
- Genres: Folk, pop rock
- Length: 35:18
- Label: Nonesuch
- Producers: Sam Amidon, Jerry Boys, Thomas Bartlett

Sam Amidon chronology
I See the Sign (2010)	Bright Sunny South (2013)	Lily-O (2014)

Professional ratings
Aggregate scores
Source	Rating
Metacritic	80/100
Review scores
Source	Rating
AllMusic	4/5 stars
American Songwriter	3/5 stars
Consequence of Sound	C+
DIY	7/10
Drowned in Sound	7/10
The Guardian	4/5 stars
musicOMH	4/5 stars
Paste	8.4/10
Pitchfork Media	7.7/10
Popmatters	7/10 discs

Bright Sunny South is an album by Sam Amidon released May 14, 2013, by Nonesuch Records The album was recorded at Snap Recording Studios and Livington Studios in London. Amidon, his friend Thomas Bartlett (a.k.a. Doveman), and Jerry Boys produced the album. Amidon sings and performs banjo, fiddle, acoustic guitar, and piano on the album. Bartlett performs several instruments, as do Shahzad Ismaily and Chris Vatalaro; Kenny Wheeler performs trumpet on two tracks.

Bright Sunny South includes interpretations of both traditional and contemporary songs, like Tim McGraw’s “My Old Friend” and Mariah Carey’s “Shake It Off," as well as a new take on “Weeping Mary,” a shape-note hymn that his parents, Peter and Mary Alice Amidon, had recorded with the Word of Mouth Chorus for Nonesuch Records on the 1977 album Rivers of Delight: American Folk Hymns from the Sacred Harp Tradition. NPR's Morning Edition host Steve Inskeep describes Bright Sunny South as "a new spin on very traditional American folk music."

== Background and recording ==
Legendary jazz trumpet player Kenny Wheeler appears on two songs on the record, one of his last recorded appearances before his death in 2014.

== Track listing ==
No.	Title	Writer(s)	Length
1.	"Bright Sunny South"	Traditional, reworked/arranged by Amidon	4:24
2.	"I Wish I Wish"	Traditional, reworked/arranged by Amidon	2:47
3.	"Short Life"	Traditional, reworked/arranged by Amidon	3:01
4.	"My Old Friend"	McEwan/Wiseman, arranged by Amidon/Bartlett	2:42
5.	"He's Taken My Feet"	Traditional, reworked/arranged by Amidon	4:28
6.	"Pharaoh"	Traditional, reworked/arranged by Amidon	4:09
7.	"As I Roved Out"	Traditional, reworked/arranged by Amidon	3:43
8.	"Shake It Off"	Cox/Carey/Austin/Dupri, arranged by Amidon	1:55
9.	"Groundhog"	Traditional, reworked/arranged by Amidon	0:46
10.	"Streets of Derry"	Traditional, reworked/arranged by Amidon	3:54
11.	"Weeping Mary"	McCurry/Power, arranged by Amidon/Bartlett	3:17

== Personnel ==
- Sam Amidon – voice, banjo, fiddle, acoustic guitar, piano
- Thomas Bartlett – piano, Hammond organ, Wurlitzer, Moog synthesizer, percussion, electric guitar
- Shahzad Ismaily – electric & acoustic guitars, electric bass, Moog bass, drum, shaker egg
- Chris Vatalaro – drums & percussion, flute, Wurlitzer
- Kenny Wheeler – trumpet
- Doug Wieselman – clarinet
- Tyler Gibbons – electric bass
