= Cosa Brava =

American experimental rock and free improvisation group

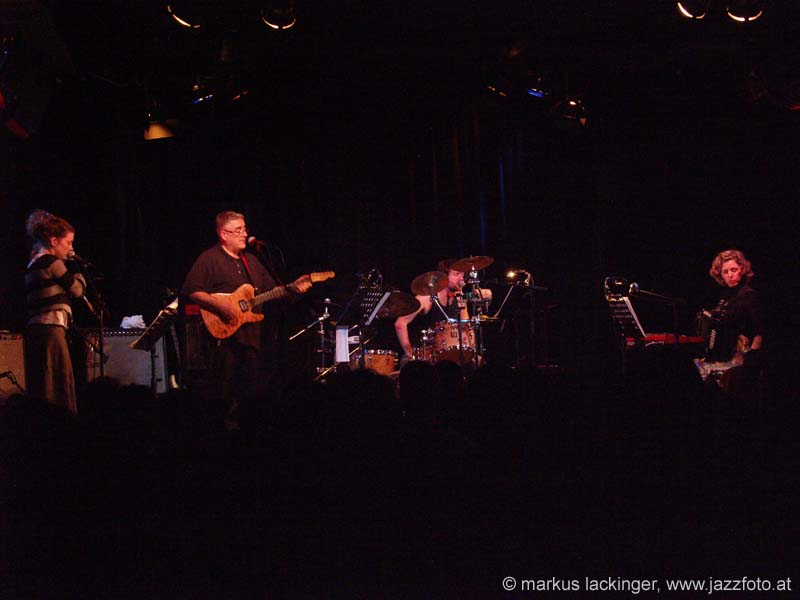
- Cosa Brava performing at Jazzit in Salzburg, Austria, April 5, 2008.

Background information
- Origin: United States
- Genres: Experimental rock; avant-rock; free improvisation
- Years active: 2008–present
- Label: Intakt
- Members: Fred Frith; Zeena Parkins; Carla Kihlstedt; Matthias Bossi; Shahzad Ismaily; The Norman Conquest

Cosa Brava is an experimental rock and free improvisation group formed in March 2008 in Oakland, California, by multi-instrumentalist and composer Fred Frith (Henry Cow, Skeleton Crew, Keep the Dog). The band comprises Frith on guitar, Zeena Parkins (Skeleton Crew, Keep the Dog) on keyboards and accordion, Carla Kihlstedt (Sleepytime Gorilla Museum) on violin, Matthias Bossi (Sleepytime Gorilla Museum) on drums, and The Norman Conquest (aka Norman Teale) on sound manipulation. All About Jazz described their music as "somewhere between folk, Celtic, modern chamber, Latin, funk, Eastern, and prog-rock".

Cosa Brava's first performance was in Oakland, California on March 20, 2008. They then went on to tour Europe in April 2008, playing in France, Germany, Austria, Slovenia, Italy, Belgium, Netherlands, Spain and Switzerland. In May 2008 they performed at the 25th Festival International de Musique Actuelle de Victoriaville in Victoriaville, Quebec, Canada, and in December 2008 at the Knitting Factory in New York City and the ICA in Boston.

Cosa Brava recorded their first album, Ragged Atlas in San Francisco in December 2008, which was released in March 2010. John Kelman in a review at All About Jazz said that the album "transcends time and genre" and is "one of 2010's most auspicious debuts". A second album entitled The Letter was released in March 2012. Cosa Brava released their third album, Z Sides in September 2024, which was conceived by The Norman Conquest. Using extracts from live mixes of the band's performances between March 2008 and their last European tour in May 2012, The Norman Conquest and Frith assembled an album of sound collages of the band's many improvisations.

== Background ==
Fred Frith's career began as a "rock musician" with Henry Cow in 1968, but has since diversified into a number of different genres, from avant-garde jazz to contemporary classical music. He has written scores for film and dance, and music for orchestras and string quartets. He became Professor of Composition the Music Department at Mills College in Oakland, California in 1999. The motivation behind the formation of Cosa Brava arose out of Frith's nostalgia for rock music. He said, "I really miss what you can do with a rock band. I miss developing material through the push and pull of cooperative rehearsals, I miss what happens when you move away from 'the parts' and start formulating things with a collective ear, I miss the single-minded commitment to a group identity."

Frith had previously worked with Zeena Parkins in Skeleton Crew and Keep the Dog, and had collaborated with Carla Kihlstedt on several albums. The Norman Conquest (real name Norman Teale) had been a student of Frith's at Mills College.

== Members ==
- Fred Frith – guitar, bass guitar, keyboards, voice
- Zeena Parkins – keyboards, accordion, Foley objects, voice
- Carla Kihlstedt – violin, voice
- Matthias Bossi – drums, voice
- Shahzad Ismaily (from 2011) – bass guitar, voice
- The Norman Conquest – sound manipulation

== Discography ==
- Ragged Atlas (2010, CD, Intakt Records, Switzerland)
- The Letter (2012, CD, Intakt Records, Switzerland)
- Z Sides (2024, CD, Klanggalerie, Austria)
