= This Coming Gladness =

Studio album by Josephine Foster
- Released: July 22, 2008
- Genre: Acid folk, psychedelic rock
- Length: 45:21
- Label: Bo'Weavil

Josephine Foster chronology
A Wolf in Sheep's Clothing (2006)	This Coming Gladness (2008)	Graphic As A Star (2010)

Professional ratings
Review scores
Source	Rating
AllMusic	4/5 stars
Tiny Mix Tapes	4/5 stars

This Coming Gladness is an album by Josephine Foster, released in 2008.

== Track listing ==
No.	Title	Length
1.	"The Garden of Earthly Delights"	5:13
2.	"The Lap of Your Lust"	5:35
3.	"Lullaby to All"	3:28
4.	"I Love You & the Springtime Blues"	5:56
5.	"All I Wanted Was the Moon"	5:39
6.	"Waltz of Green"	5:13
7.	"Sim Não"	3:00
8.	"Second Sight"	3:51
9.	"A Thimble Full of Milk"	3:37
10.	"Indelible Rainbows"	3:49
