= All the Leaves Are Gone =

Studio album by Josephine Foster & The Supposed
- Released: October 5, 2004
- Genres: Psychedelic folk, psychedelic rock
- Length: 43:17
- Label: Locust Records
- Producer: Josephine Foster

Josephine Foster & The Supposed chronology
All the Leaves Are Gone (2004)	Hazel Eyes, I Will Lead You (2005)

Professional ratings
Review scores
Source	Rating
Allmusic	3.5/5 stars
Pitchfork	(7.7/10)

All the Leaves Are Gone is an album by Josephine Foster and The Supposed, released in 2004.

== Track listing ==
1. "Well-Heeled Men" – 5:40
2. "The Most Loved One" – 3:52
3. "All the Leaves Are Gone" – 3:37
4. "Nana" – 4:31
5. "Deathknell" – 3:43
6. "Silly Song" – 4:37
7. "Jailbird (Hero of the Sorrow)" – 3:28
8. "Worried and Sorry" – 3:08
9. "Who Will Feel Bitter at the Days End?" – 3:46
10. "John Ave. Seen from the Gray Train" – 4:34
11. "Don't Wait, Mary Jane" – 3:50
12. "(You Are Worth) A Million Dollars" - 2:23

== Personnel ==
- Josephine Foster (vocals, classical guitar, tambourine)
- Brian Goodman (vocals, electric guitar, bass guitar)
- Rusty Peterson (drums).
