= But This Chicken Proved Falsehearted =

Studio album by Sam Amidon
- Released: 2007
- Recorded: Harlem
- Genre: Folk
- Length: 41:08
- Label: Plug Research and Omnivore Recordings
- Producer: Thomas Bartlett

Sam Amidon chronology
Home Alone Inside My Head (2003)	But This Chicken Proved Falsehearted (2007)	All Is Well (2008)

Professional ratings
Review scores
Source	Rating
AllMusic	4/5 stars
Prefix Mag	7.5/10 stars
Popmatters	7/10 stars

But This Chicken Proved Falsehearted is the first album of songs by experimental folk artist Sam Amidon, going under the name Samamidon. The album was produced by Thomas Bartlett. It was initially released in 2007 by Plug Research in the US and Birdwar in Europe, and was reissued by Omnivore Recordings in 2015.

== Background and recording ==
At the time of recording, Amidon was living in New York City and playing in the experimental indie rock bands Doveman and Stars Like Fleas. The album was recorded at Bartlett's home in Harlem, where Amidon then lived. Bartlett and Amidon had been friends since childhood and had played music together since a young age, as teenagers in the New England folk group Popcorn Behaviour, and later in Bartlett's indie rock band Doveman. The material drew from traditional American public domain folksongs, reworked by Amidon, as well as a spare reading of the Tears For Fears song "Head Over Heels."

== Release and reception ==
But This Chicken Proved Falsehearted was released in 2007 on the Los Angeles-based electronic music label Plug Research, featuring cover art drawn by Amidon with colours by Gabriel Greenberg. The song "Tribulation" was featured in a music video directed by Bartlett's brother Ezra Caldwell. The album received positive notices from critics and blogs, with Stylus Magazine calling it "the most interesting folk album of 2007" and Angry Ape saying "But This Chicken Proved Falsehearted is undoubtedly as engaging a sonic experiment as any you'll hear this year."

== Track listing ==
1. "Falsehearted Chicken" – 5:05
2. "True Born Sons of Levi" – 4:00
3. "Interlude" – 0:50
4. "Head Over Heels" – 3:11
5. "1842" – 5:01
6. "Another Man Done Gone" – 2:35
7. "Louis Collins" – 4:47
8. "Roll On John" – 2:54
9. "Rocky Island" – 2:48
10. "Tribulation" – 5:58
11. "Oh Where" – 3:00

== Personnel ==
- Sam Amidon: vocals, banjo, acoustic guitar
- Thomas Bartlett: Piano, Drums, Guitar, Electric Guitar, Accordion, Wurlitzer, Organ, Omnichord
- Produced and mixed by Thomas Bartlett
- Mastered by Charlie Pilzer at Airshow Mastering
