= I See the Sign =

Studio album by Sam Amidon
- Released: 2010
- Studio: Greenhouse Studios, Reykjavík
- Genre: Folk
- Length: 42:22
- Label: Bedroom Community
- Producer: Valgeir Sigurðsson

Sam Amidon chronology
| All Is Well (2008) | I See the Sign (2010) | Bright Sunny South (2013) |

I See the Sign is the third album by experimental folk artist Sam Amidon, released in 2010. The album features Amidon’s radical reworkings of traditional folk songs, with chamber-orchestra arrangements by composer Nico Muhly; multi-instrumental contributions from Shahzad Ismaily, and guest vocals by Beth Orton. It was produced and mixed by Valgeir Sigurðsson at Greenhouse Studios in Reykjavík and released on the Bedroom Community label.

== Background and recording ==
The songs for I See the Sign consist primarily of Amidon’s reworked renditions of traditional American folksongs, drawing on shape note hymns, murder ballads, and singing games from the Georgia Sea Islands, as well as a cover of the R Kelly song Relief. The album’s recording emerged from the Bedroom Community label, with appearances from all of the members from the label at that time, and recorded entirely at Valgeir’s Greenhouse Studios in Reykjavík.

In a 2010 interview with Popmatters, Amidon described how the process started with himself and Ismaily and went from there: "When Shahzad and I went into the studio in Iceland, we put many of the basic tracks down live together, with him playing bass or drums or percussion or strange noises or Moog or electric guitar, basically playing everything there was to play. Some he’d do live with me, and other parts he’d add later – he is able to play many instruments at once, but not all of them. He has many limbs. When he was playing his drum parts, I sat at a very large oak table in front of the drum kit and waved my arms in the air and drew diagrams for him to follow or disobey. After that point, it took on more of the shape of the way I made the last few records – Nico’s arrangements were added without my presence, I arrived last summer and there they were in all their mind-altering twinkling glory; and Beth Orton came with me to Iceland to sing on a number of songs and we did those together, and then Valgeir and I spent time carving things away from everything that had been added and figuring out what we had."

== Release and reception ==
Professional ratings
Aggregate scores
| Source | Rating |
|---|---|
| Metacritic | 86/100 |
Review scores
| Source | Rating |
| AllMusic | 4.5/5 stars |
| Cokemachineglow | 77% |
| Drowned In Sound | 8/10 |
| Mojo | 5/5 stars |
| Pitchfork | 8.1/10 |
| PopMatters | 9/10 |
| Q | 4/5 stars |
| The Skinny | 3/5 stars |
| Sputnikmusic | 4/5 |
| Uncut | 4/5 stars |

I See the Sign received a strong reception from critics and appeared on many year-end lists, including Ben Ratliff’s Top 10 in the New York Times, and an honourable mention in Pitchfork’s year-end albums roundup. Discussing the songs of I See the Sign in the Times, Ratliff wrote, "Playing guitar or banjo as he sings, [Amidon] transforms all of them, changing their colors and loading them with trapdoors. He slows them down and rewrites their harmonies, making curious, arty, quiet pop in his own mood — ornery, sensitive, distant. I See the Sign is a seriously intelligent record, but never cute or overbearing; its Icelandic producer, Sigurðsson, has left it dry and full of space, so that you hear the seams." Pitchfork’s review stated that "interpretations are so singular that it stops mattering how (or if) these songs existed before-- all that matters is how they exist now." The All Music Guide review says that "Each of these collaborators adds to the album's rich, expansive, textural palette, allowing considerable psychological range within its generously subdued tone… But always at the forefront are Amidon's voice --which recalls Will Oldham in its restraint and slight rustic roughness – and, especially, the songs he has chosen to make his own."

Amidon toured the album extensively, both on his own and as a member of the Bedroom Community Whale Watching Tour, which brought together Muhly, Frost, Sigurðssson and Amidon to perform a concert of each other’s music collaboratively. The experiences of this tour and its concerts were documented in the film Everything, Everywhere, All The Time.

== Track listing ==
1. "How Come That Blood" – 3:32
2. "Way Go Lily" – 4:18
3. "You Better Mind" – 3:43
4. "I See the Sign" – 6:16
5. "Johanna the Row-di" – 2:28
6. "Pretty Fair Damsel" – 3:07
7. "Kedron" – 2:58
8. "Rain and Snow" – 3:56
9. "Climbing High Mountains" – 3:07
10. "Relief" – 5:22
11. "Red" – 3:46

== Personnel ==
- Sam Amidon – voice, banjo, acoustic guitar, electric guitar
- Shahzad Ismaily – drums, vocals, bass, percussion, electric guitar, acoustic guitar, Mini-Moog Synthesizer
- Nico Muhly – string/brass/woodwind arrangements, piano, arrangements, Celesta, Harmonium
- Valgeir Sigurðsson – bass, percussion, synthesiser
- Beth Orton – vocals, nylon string guitar
- Ben Frost – electric guitar on track 11
- Additional engineering – Paul Corley, Paul Evans

Chamber Orchestra

- Bassoon – Rebekka Bryndís Björnsdóttir
- Cello – Hrafnkell Orri Egilsson
- Clarinet – Helga Björg Arnardóttir
- Flute – Melkorka Ólafsdóttir
- Oboe, English Horn – Matthías Nardeu*
- Trombone – Helgi Hrafn Jónsson
- Viola – Þórarinn Már Baldursson
- Violin – Sigrún Eðvaldsdóttir, Una Sveinbjarnardóttir
