= Present Music =

- Established: 1982
- Location: Milwaukee, WI
- Co-Artistic Directors: David Bloom & Eric Segnitz
- Website: www.presentmusic.org

Present Music is a contemporary nonprofit music organization and ensemble based in Milwaukee, WI. It was founded in 1982, and is currently led by founder and Artistic Director Kevin Stalheim. Present Music has put on shows in many venues around the world, but primarily performs in Milwaukee.

== Background ==
Present Music was founded in Milwaukee, Wisconsin by Kevin Stalheim in 1982. Since its inception, the organization has performed or commissioned composition of new music by living composers. Its music is considered to be 21st Century music, and is often polystylistic and eclectic, incorporating unique instrumentation and musical techniques. Present Music is nonprofit, and is supported by ticket sales, grants, and donations. Present Music also has an education program called the Creation Project.

In 2019, violinist/composer Eric Segnitz and conductor David Bloom became Co-Artistic Directors of the ensemble. In 2024 David Bloom became Artistic Advisor and Principal Conductor.

== Concerts ==
Present Music puts on six or seven concerts every season, many of which operate around a central theme or idea. In addition to the musical aspects of the presentations, some of its concerts include an elaborate or immersive visual aspect as well, such as dance or video. As well as hosting many concerts in Milwaukee, Present Music has performed at festivals around the world. Notable Present Music appearances include:

- The Bang on a Can music festival in New York
- The Columbia University Composer Portraits Series in New York
- The Interlink Festival of New American Music in Japan
- The Istanbul International Music Festival in Turkey

== Discography ==
The Present Music Ensemble has been featured on several different CDs of some of the works that Present Music composers have written, including:

- Flight Box (2001)
- Haunted America (2002)
- In White (2004)
- Michael Torke: 6 (2005)
- Henry Brandt Collection, Vol. 3 (2006)
- Graffiti (2009)
- Kamran Ince (2010)
- Kamran Ince Passion and Dreams (2016)
- Ryan Carter: On a Better Filtering Algorithm (David Bloom, Kairos 2022)
- 26 Little Deaths (Carla Kihlstedt, Cantaloupe Music, 2025)
- Raven Chacon: Voiceless Mass (David Bloom, Ariadne Greif, New World Records, 2025)

== Creation Project ==
The Creation Project is a program in which Present Music teams one of their in-residence composers with a group of students ranging from little musical understanding to advanced. The composer works with the students over 10 weeks to teach them about melody, rhythm, and harmony, culminating in an original composition written by the students. The Creation Project is traditionally done with young people, but has been conducted with members of a senior center as well.

=== Composers in residence ===
These are the past and present composers in residence for Present Music.

- John Adams
- Timo Andres
- Thomas Bloch
- Jeffrey Brooks
- Ryan Carter
- Christopher Cerrone
- Mary Ellen Childs
- Michael Daugherty
- John Downey
- Paul Dresher
- Alexandra du Bois
- Sean Friar
- Annie Gosfield
- Daron Hagen
- Kimmo Hakola
- John Harbison
- Eleanor Hovda
- Kamran Ince
- Ben Johnston
- Molly Joyce
- Jerome Kitzke
- Guy Klucevsek
- Joan La Barbara
- Mary Jane Lamond
- David Lang
- Daniel Lentz
- Scott Lindroth
- Armando Luna
- Tod Machover
- Wendy MacIsaac
- Caroline Mallonee
- Ingram Marshall
- Ira Mowitz
- Amy X Neuburg
- Russell Platt
- Eric Segnitz
- Bright Sheng
- Roberto Sierra
- Sigmund Snopek III
- Carl Stone
- Michael Torke
- Lois V. Vierk
- Qu Xiao-Song

== Recognition ==
=== Adventurous programming awards ===
Present Music is a six-time recipient of the American Society of Composers, Authors and Publishers Adventurous Programming Award. Among the six awards are:

- First Prize in Adventurous Programming, Self-Presenting Ensemble for the 2002–2003 season.
- Second Prize in Adventurous Programming, Self-Presenting Chamber Ensemble - New Music, for the 2003-2004 Season.
- First Prize in Adventurous Programming for Small Presenter - Contemporary for the 2009–2010 season.

=== Wisconsin Area Music Industry Awards ===
The Present Music Ensemble has been the recipient of the Wisconsin Area Music Industry Award in the Classical Group category. Some of the years in which Present Music was the winner of this award are 2002, 2004, and 2008.
