= The Following Mountain =

Studio album by Sam Amidon
- Released: 2017
- Recorded: London & Brooklyn
- Length: 41:21
- Label: Nonesuch Records
- Producer: Leo Abrahams, Shahzad Ismaily

Sam Amidon chronology
Lily-O (2014)	The Following Mountain (2017)

The Following Mountain is the sixth album by singer and multi-instrumentalist Sam Amidon, released in 2017 by Nonesuch Records. It is Amidon's first album of original compositions, the previous albums having been made up primarily of re-worked traditional folk songs. The album was produced by Leo Abrahams with additional production from Shahzad Ismaily, and it includes contributions from legendary free jazz drummer Milford Graves, as well as the saxophonist Sam Gendel, drummer Chris Vatalaro, multi-instrumentalist Ismaily, and Jimi Hendrix percussionist Juma Sultan on the song "Juma Mountain." Amidon himself plays fiddle, banjo, acoustic and electric guitars, and Moog synthesizer on the album, along with his own vocals.

== Background and recording ==
Amidon has described the album as "a walk through the thickets of the imagination… a personal mythology of sounds and visions and characters." In his liner note to the album he described how the initial recording session for the album was an epic day of improvisation at Ismaily's Figure 8 Studios in Brooklyn, with Ismaily, saxophonist Sam Gendel, and drummer Milford Graves, and Juma Sultan making an appearance later in the day. After this, Amidon brought the recordings back to London, where he worked with producer Leo Abrahams to shape and grow new songs, using the Brooklyn jam session as a jumping off point. Although all of the music was composed by Amidon, he did take inspiration lyrically from the Appalachian folk music that has been the focus of his previous records – for example, "Warren" draws on a 17th-century English poem as well as some phrases from an ancient Chinese poem, and "Blackbird" takes its lyrics from a traditional American song.

== Release and reception ==
Professional ratings
Review scores
Source	Rating
The Guardian	4/5 stars
Pitchfork	7/10 stars
AllMusic	3.5/5 stars
Irish Times	4/5 stars
Uncut	8/10 stars
London Evening Standard	4/5 stars
Under the Radar	7.5/10 stars
Exclaim!	7/10

The Following Mountain was released on 26 May 2017, by Nonesuch Records, after the initial single and lyric video "Juma Mountain" had been premiered earlier that month. Amidon performed an album-release show at Brooklyn's Union Pool on 14 June, in a concert that included Milford Graves, Shahzad Ismaily and Sam Gendel, primary musicians from the album.

The album was well received by critics, who noted the innovative and experimental qualities of the album, while still retaining connections to Amidon's earlier work. Uncut Magazine wrote that "Amidon's first album of original songs feels like a liberation… there's a loose, improvisational sensibility to these performances, enhanced by the extraordinary juxtaposition of his antique fiddle and mournfully keening voice against the skittering, freeform percussion of Milford Graves, a veteran of Albert Ayler's free-jazz collective, and Juma Sultan, who performed with Hendrix at Woodstock." fRoots magazine said, "The Following Mountain sees a further leap among Amidon's established continuum on which free jazz improvisations and traditional sensibilities cohabit, sometimes spare and simple, sometimes colliding with jarring urgency… Amidon shows that he isn't a restless or purposeless innovator. His music feels both conscious and free… It's a beauty." Aquarium Drunkard declared The Following Mountain to be "the destination, the culmination of Amidon's musical conversations thus far."

== Track listing ==
All songs by Sam Amidon

1. "Fortune" – 2:20
2. "Ghosts" – 2:02
3. "Juma Mountain" – 3:38
4. "Another Story Told" – 4:38
5. "Gendel in 5" – 4:28
6. "Blackbird" – 2:46
7. "Trouble in Mind" – 5:01
8. "Warren" – 4:32
9. "April" (Feat. Milford Graves) – 11:47

== Personnel ==
=== Musicians ===
- Sam Amidon – vocals (1–9), acoustic guitars (1, 3–5, 7–9), fiddle (2, 4, 7, 9), electric guitars (3, 7), banjo (6, 9), saxophone triggering (8)
- Chris Vatalaro – drums (1, 3–8), piano (1), flutes (5)
- Milford Graves – drums (2, 8, 9)
- Leo Abrahams – drum processing (2), synth bass (3), synthesizers (3–7), electric bass (5, 8), Moog synthesizer (5, 8), accordion (6), drum loop & programming (7, 8), Moog bass (7)
- Juma Sultan – percussion (3)
- Sam Gendel – saxophone breathing (3), alto saxophone (5, 9), sampled saxophone (8)
- Shahzad Ismaily – percussion (3), electric bass (3, 7–9), beat programming (4), electric guitar (4), Hammond organ (7), Moog Rogue (9)

=== Production ===
- Produced by Leo Abrahams, except for "April," produced by Shahzad Ismaily, and "Another Story Told," produced by Ismaily and Abrahams
- Engineered by Leo Abrahams in London, except for "April," engineered by Sam Owens at Figure 8 Studios in Brooklyn
- Additional engineering by Shahzad Ismaily and Adam Hirsch at Figure 8, Brett Shaw and Leo Abrahams at 123 Studios in London, and John Spiker at Studio Supreme in Los Angeles
- Mixed by Leo Abrahams
- Mastered by Guy Davies at Electric Mastering
