= All Is Well (album) =

Studio album by Sam Amidon
- Released: 2008
- Recorded: Greenhouse Studios, Reykjavík
- Genre: Folk
- Length: 47:50
- Label: Bedroom Community
- Producer: Valgeir Sigurðsson

Sam Amidon chronology
But This Chicken Proved Falsehearted (2007)	All Is Well (2008)	I See the Sign (2010)

Professional ratings
Review scores
Source	Rating
AllMusic	3.5/5 stars
Stylus Magazine	A
LAS Magazine	9.3 stars on a 10 point scale
Pitchfork	7.8 stars on a 10 point scale
PopMatters	9/10 stars
Scene Point Blank	8.5/10 stars
The Milk Factory	4.7 stars on a 5 point scale

All Is Well is the second album by the singer and multi-instrumentalist Sam Amidon, released in 2008. It was produced and mixed by Valgeir Sigurðsson at Greenhouse Studios in Reykjavík and released on the Bedroom Community label. The album features Amidon's reworkings of traditional folk songs (mostly Appalachian), with chamber-orchestra arrangements by composer Nico Muhly and additional contributions from violist Eyvind Kang, electronic musician Ben Frost, and percussionists Aaron Siegel and Stefan Amidon.

== Background and recording ==
Amidon had recorded his first album of songs, But This Chicken Proved Falsehearted, with his childhood friend Thomas Bartlett, at their apartment in Harlem. Bartlett gave a copy of the as-yet-unreleased Chicken songs to his friend Nico Muhly, who in turn brought the recordings to Iceland, where he passed along copies to Bjork and producer Valgeir Sigurdsson, both of whom Muhly was collaborating with on various projects.

Upon hearing Amidon's music, Sigurðsson and Muhly, who were forming the Bedroom Community label with electronic composer Ben Frost, invited Amidon to come to Reykjavík for the 2006 Airwaves Festival. One night during the visit, Amidon put down the basic tracks for what was to become All Is Well, late at night, with Valgeir engineering. As with Amidon's first album, the material for the songs drew from traditional folk sources such as Dock Boggs and Bessie Jones, with the music and song structures reworked dramatically by Amidon. Nico Muhly's chamber-orchestra arrangements were scored for brass, woodwinds, and strings.

== Critical reception ==
All Is Well received a positive reception from critics. David Fricke, writing in Rolling Stone Magazine, said that "In an era of overheated Nick Drake comparisons, Amidon is eerily close to the real thing, singing in a fragile but certain tenor against the deep breath and soft sweep of Nico Muhly’s orchestrations. A better analogy is the big quiet in Björk’s Vespertine and Medúlla albums. Producer Valgeir Sigurðsson worked on both records; he conjures a similar, pregnant resonance here around Amidon’s voice and plucked-wire guitar — a public domain that is all inner space." Musician Glen Hansard has written that the album "brings me huge comfort – it speaks across time somehow. Sam has taken some very old traditional folksongs and reworked them into new and delicate phrasings… I revisit this album over and over again."

== Track listing ==
1. "Sugar Baby" – 5:24
2. "Little Johnny Brown" – 4:30
3. "Saro" – 3:23
4. "Wild Bill Jones" – 5:28
5. "Wedding Dress" – 4:34
6. "Fall On My Knees" – 4:18
7. "Little Satchel" – 4:18
8. "O Death" – 5:17
9. "Prodigal Son" – 6:19
10. "All Is Well" – 4:25

== Personnel ==
- Sam Amidon: voice, banjo, acoustic guitar, electric guitar, fiddle on 6
- Nico Muhly: piano, arrangements
- Stefan Amidon: drums on 4 and 5
- Ben Frost: programming on 2, bass on 6
- Aaron Siegel: percussive textures on 2 and 10, glockenspiel on 10
- Morse: voice on 7
- Eyvind Kang: viola on 2 and 9
- Valgeir Sigurðsson – electronics, bass, harmonium, percussion on 2 and 6
- Helgi Hrafn Jónsson – trombone

Produced, recorded and mixed by Valgeir Sigurðsson Wind/brass/string arrangements by Nico Muhly
