= Hazel Eyes, I Will Lead You =

Studio album by Josephine Foster
- Released: April 19, 2005
- Genre: Folk, psychedelic folk
- Length: 43:25
- Label: Locust Records

Josephine Foster chronology
| All the Leaves Are Gone (2004) | Hazel Eyes, I Will Lead You (2005) | A Wolf in Sheep's Clothing (2006) |

Professional ratings
Review scores
| Source | Rating |
|---|---|
| AllMusic | 3.5/5 stars |
| Pitchfork Media | (7.8/10) |
| Stylus Magazine | (B) |

Hazel Eyes, I Will Lead You is the second solo studio album by Josephine Foster, released in 2005.

== Track listing ==
1. "The Siren's Admonition" – 4:24
2. "Hazel Eyes, I Will Lead You" – 3:26
3. "By the Shape of Your Pearls" – 1:22
4. "Stones Throw from Heaven" – 3:18
5. "Where There Are Trees" – 1:22
6. "The Golden Wooden Tone" – 3:01
7. "There Are Eyes Above" – 3:50
8. "Celebrant's Song" – 3:41
9. "Good News" – 3:07
10. "Trees Lay By" – 2:59
11. "The Pruner's Pair" – 3:10
12. "Crackerjack Fool" – 2:40
13. "The Way Is Sweetly Mown" – 4:44
14. "Hominy Grits" – 2:21
