= Heartmind (album) =

Studio album by Cass McCombs
- Released: August 19, 2022
- Studios: Brooklyn, New York; Burbank, California, USA
- Genres: Americana, folk rock
- Length: 42:27
- Label: Anti-
- Producers: Ariel Rechtshaid; Buddy Ross; Cass McCombs; Shahzad Ismaily

Cass McCombs chronology
Tip of the Sphere (2019)	Heartmind (2022)	Mr. Greg & Cass McCombs Sing and Play New Folk Songs for Children (2023)

Singles from Heartmind
- 1. "Belong to Heaven" Released: April 26, 2022; 2. "Unproud Warrior" Released: June 8, 2022; 3. "Karaoke" Released: July 19, 2022

Heartmind is the tenth studio album by American singer-songwriter Cass McCombs. It was released on August 19, 2022, on Anti- Records.

== Recording ==
The album was recorded over a period of several years, in Brooklyn, New York, and Burbank, California, with producers Shahzad Ismaily, Buddy Ross, and Ariel Rechtshaid. It was mixed by Rob Schnapf. The album includes contributions from Wynonna Judd, Danielle Haim, Joe Russo, the Chapin Sisters, and Charles Burnham. In the liner notes, McCombs dedicated the record to the memory of three late musicians: guitarist Neal Casal, who died in 2019 and was his bandmate in the Skiffle Players; Chet "JR" White, producer and bass player for Girls, who died in 2020; and Sam Jayne, the songwriter from Lync and Love as Laughter who also died in 2020.

== Critical reception ==
Professional ratings
Aggregate scores
Source	Rating
Metacritic	85/100
Review scores
Source	Rating
AllMusic	4/5 stars
The Observer	4/5 stars
Pitchfork	8.1/10
Uncut	4.5/5 stars
Under the Radar	8/10

At Metacritic, which assigns a normalized rating out of 100 to reviews from mainstream critics, Heartmind received an average score of 85 based on 10 reviews, indicating "universal acclaim". Michael James Hall of Under the Radar wrote, "Heartmind is an album that demands, then requites, love and attention. It's at times evasive, often ambiguous, always sophisticated, and never much less than compelling. For those willing to dedicate their time to exploring its shadowy riches, it's a gratifying if elusory pleasure." Mark Richardson of The Wall Street Journal wrote of the album, "Like so much of his best work, it tackles hard questions and draws on a wide range of music, but it's ultimately accessible and easy to appreciate on first listen", calling it "an arresting collection of songs that tackles pain and uncertainty with humor and grace, from an underrated troubadour who makes it look easy".

== Track listing ==
All tracks are written by Cass McCombs.

No.	Title	Length
1.	"Music Is Blue"	4:49
2.	"Karaoke"	3:41
3.	"New Earth"	4:11
4.	"Unproud Warrior"	6:33
5.	"Krakatau"	4:58
6.	"A Blue, Blue Band"	5:34
7.	"Belong to Heaven"	4:11
8.	"Heartmind"	8:28
Total length:		42:27

== Personnel ==
- Cass McCombs – production (tracks 1, 7)
- Ariel Rechtshaid – production (1, 7)
- Shahzad Ismaily – production (2, 4–6, 8)
- Buddy Ross – production (3)
- Rob Schnapf – mixing
- Phil Weinrobe – engineering
