= Digital Wildlife =

Live album by Maybe Monday
- Released: 2002
- Recorded: May 2001
- Venue: Guerilla Euphorics, Oakland, California
- Genre: Avant-garde jazz, Improvisation
- Length: 49:04
- Label: Winter & Winter 910 071
- Producer: Fred Frith

Maybe Monday chronology
| Saturn's Finger (1999) | Digital Wildlife (2002) | Unsquare (2008) |

Digital Wildlife is an album by composer and guitarist Fred Frith's group Maybe Monday which was released on the Winter & Winter label.

== Reception ==
Professional ratings
Review scores
| Source | Rating |
|---|---|
| Allmusic | 3.5/5 stars |

Allmusic gave the album 3½ stars. JazzTimes' Aaron Steinberg observed "Digital Wildlife can sound, at any random point, like chamber-classical, abstract rock or folk. Frith also takes the title of the recording quite seriously: he seems to have taken tapes from the group's live-time improvisations and mixed them into a multilayered, abruptly shifting, densely overlapping collage of machine music. Acoustic and electronic elements have been cut, rearranged and pasted into a dreamy floating space, where any voice could at any time sound thoroughly foregrounded, distant, looped or distorted beyond recognition... Digital Wildlife has ambience to spare, though to most it will sound like a racket. Give this one some time. Frith has carefully crafted his own lexicon of sound, and once you've tuned in to what he's doing this beautiful recording pays dividends".

== Track listing ==
All compositions by Fred Frith, Joan Jeanrenaud, Miya Masaoka and Larry Ochs

1. "Digital Wildlife" – 12:11
2. "Image In and Atom" – 9:55
3. "The Prisoners' Dilemma" – 14:30
4. "Touch / Risk" – 7:23
5. "Close to Home" – 4:58

== Personnel ==
- Fred Frith – electric guitar
- Joan Jeanrenaud – cello
- Miya Masaoka – koto, electronics
- Larry Ochs – tenor saxophone, sopranino saxophone
