= Carla Kihlstedt =

American violinist, singer and composer

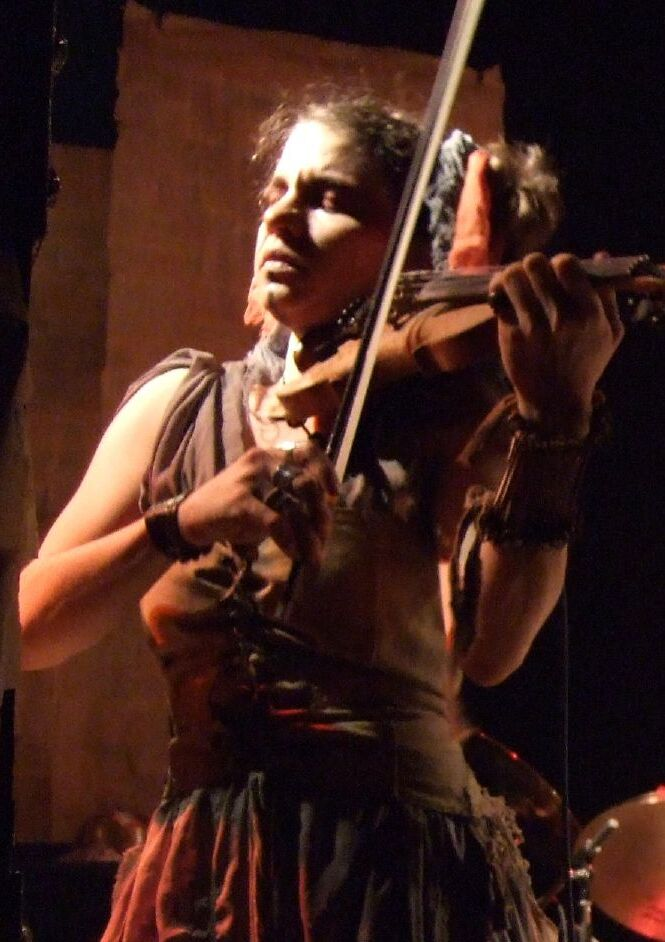
- Carla Kihlstedt performing with Sleepytime Gorilla Museum, Austria, November 2007

Background information
- Born: 1971 (age 54–55); Lancaster, Pennsylvania, U.S.
- Genres: Avant-garde, experimental, free improvisation, contemporary classical
- Occupations: Musician, composer
- Instruments: Violin, keyboards, vocals
- Years active: 1998–present
- Labels: Tzadik, Twelve Cups, Intakt
- Website: www.carlakihlstedt.com

Carla Kihlstedt (born 1971) is an American composer, violinist, vocalist, and multi-instrumentalist, originally from Lancaster, Pennsylvania and currently working from a home studio on Cape Cod.

She is a founding member of Tin Hat Trio (1997, renamed Tin Hat), Sleepytime Gorilla Museum, The Book of Knots, Causing a Tiger, and Rabbit Rabbit Radio. Other musical projects include 2 Foot Yard, Charming Hostess and Minamo (Carla Kihlstedt & Satoko Fujii). She is a recognized classical composer who has performed with the International Contemporary Ensemble (ICE), has worked occasionally on projects with Tom Waits, John Zorn, and Fred Frith, and recorded numerous albums as a guest or session musician. Kihlstedt has studied at the Peabody Conservatory of Music, San Francisco Conservatory of Music, and Oberlin Conservatory of Music.

In February 2012 she founded Rabbit Rabbit Radio with her husband (and Sleepytime Gorilla Museum drummer) Matthias Bossi. Rabbit Rabbit Radio released their debut album, Rabbit Rabbit Radio – Vol. 1 in 2013. The band revolves around a song-a-month subscription through their Bandcamp profile.

== Personal life ==
She is the sister of American actress Rya Kihlstedt.

== Discography ==
=== Collaborations and bands ===
Phil Gelb, Carla Kihlstedt, John Shiurba, Matthew Sperry

- 1998–99 – Smoking Balance: The Complete Recordings (Limited Sedition, 2011)

Charming Hostess

- 1999 – Eat (Vaccination)
- 2004 – Punch (RēR)
- 2004 – Sarajevo Blues (Tzadik)

Tin Hat

- 1999 – Memory Is an Elephant (Angel)
- 2000 – Helium (Angel)
- 2002 – The Rodeo Eroded (Ropeadope/Rykodisc)
- 2004 – Book of Silk (Ropeadope/Rykodisc)
- 2007 – The Sad Machinery of Spring (Hannibal)
- 2007 – La giusta distanza (OST, Radiofandango)
- 2010 – Foreign Legion (BAG)
- 2012 – The Rain Is a Handsome Animal (New Amsterdam)

Sleepytime Gorilla Museum

- 2001 – Grand Opening and Closing (Seeland/Belle Antique/Chaosophy)
- 2003 – Live (Sickroom)
- 2004 – Of Natural History (Web of Mimicry)
- 2005 – The Face with Shinichi "Momo" Koga (DVD, not on label)
- 2007 – In Glorious Times (The End)
- 2024 – of the Last Human Being (Avant Night)

2 Foot Yard

- 2003 – 2 Foot Yard (Tzadik)
- 2008 – Borrowed Arms (Yard Work/CD Baby)

Lesli Dalaba, Fred Frith, Eric Glick Rieman & Carla Kihlstedt

- 2003 – Dalaba Frith Glick Rieman Kihlstedt (Accretions)

The Book of Knots

- 2004 – The Book of Knots (Arclight)
- 2007 – Traineater (ANTI-)
- 2011 – Garden of Fainting Stars (Ipecac)

Carla Kihlstedt & Shahzad Ismaily

- 2004 – Flying Low (Holy Night in the Outhouse)

Carla Kihlstedt, Fred Frith & Stevie Wishart

- 2006 – The Compass, Log and Lead (Intakt)

Carla Kihlstedt & Satoko Fujii

- 2007 – Minamo (Henceforth)
- 2009 – Kuroi Kawa ~ Black River (Tzadik)

Cosa Brava

- 2010 – Ragged Atlas (Intakt)
- 2012 – The Letter (Intakt)
- 2024 – Z Sides (Klanggalerie)

Causing a Tiger

- 2010 – Causing a Tiger (Les Disques Victo)
- 2011 – How We Held Our Post (Twelve Cups)

Carla Kihlstedt & Matthias Bossi

- 2008 – Ravish (And Other Tales for the Stage) with Dan Rathbun (Twelve Cups)
- 2011 – Still You Lay Dreaming: Tales for the Stage, II (self-released)
- 2012 – Niagara Falling: Tales for the Stage, III (self-released)
- 2016 – Grace and Delia Are Gone: Tales for the Stage, IV (self-released)

Rabbit Rabbit Radio

- 2013 – Rabbit Rabbit Radio – Vol. 1 (self-released)
- 2014 – Rabbit Rabbit Radio – Vol. 2: Swallow Me Whole (self-released)
- 2015 – Rabbit Rabbit Radio – Vol. 3: Year of the Wooden Horse (self-released)
- 2018 – Black Inscription (self-released)
- 2019 – Music from "Life On Wheels" (self-released)
- 2021 – Rabbit Rabbit Radio – Vol. 4: The Animal I Am (self-released)
- 2022 – Rabbit Rabbit Radio – Vol. 5: Love is Code (self-released)

Carla Kihlstedt & Rafael Osés

- 2021 – Necessary Monsters (self-released)

Carla Kihlstedt/Present Music

- 2025 – 26 Little Deaths (Cantaloupe Music)

=== As a guest or session musician ===
- 1994 – Carnival Skin – Dreamchair Music
- 1998 – Twelve Minor – Ben Goldberg
- 1998 – III – The Grassy Knoll
- 1998 – What Is the Difference Between Stripping & Playing the Violin? – Masaoka Orchestra
- 1998 – Buddy Systems – Selected Duos and Trios – Gino Robair
- 1998 – Sonarchy 1998 – Sonarchy Trio: Kihlstedt, Gino Robair, Matthew Sperry (released 2008)
- 1999 – Beauty and the Bloodsucker – Eugene Chadbourne and the Insect and Western Party
- 1999 – Half-wit Anthems – Deadweight
- 1999 – Bryant Street – Dubtribe Sound System
- 1999 – California – Mr. Bungle
- 1999 – Blue – Third Eye Blind
- 1999 – Pokey in the Bobo – Baby Snufkin
- 2000 – Revolver (A New Spin) – Ann Dyer
- 2000 – Shuffle Play: Elegies for the Recording Angel – John Schott
- 2000 – American Pi – Austin Willacy
- 2001 – This Ungodly Hour – Mumble & Peg
- 2002 – Alice – Tom Waits
- 2002 – Trilectic – Jewlia Eisenberg
- 2003 – Rybi Tuk – Už Jsme Doma
- 2003 – Ghost Taxi – Eesk
- 2004 – I'm Gonna Stop Killing – Carla Bozulich
- 2004 – Timelines – Lesli Dalaba
- 2004 – To Each According... – Redressers
- 2004 – An Alligator in Your Wallet – Rova::Orkestrova
- 2005 – Tommyland: The Ride – Tommy Lee
- 2005 – Love Songs – Peter Garland
- 2005 – Motel – PAK
- 2005 – Electric Ascension – Rova::Orkestrova
- 2005 – Thin Pillow – Thin Pillow
- 2006 – There Be Squabbles Ahead – Stolen Babies
- 2006 – The Door, the Hat, the Chair, the Fact – Ben Goldberg
- 2006 – Half the Perfect World – Madeleine Peyroux
- 2006 – Orphans: Brawlers, Bawlers & Bastards – Tom Waits
- 2006 – Dreaming Through the Noise – Vienna Teng
- 2006 – The Happy End Problem – Fred Frith
- 2007 – A Distant Youth – Wu Fei
- 2007 – A Handful of World; Kafka Songs – Lisa Bielawa
- 2007 – Two Rooms of Uranium Inside 83 Markers – Moe! Staiano's Moe!kestra!
- 2008 – Unsquare – Maybe Monday
- 2008 – Our Bright Future – Tracy Chapman
- 2008 – Diana and James – Greg Copeland
- 2009 – Sugar – Mary Bragg
- 2009 – Fear Draws Misfortune – Cheer-Accident
- 2009 – Nowhere, Sideshow, Thin Air – Fred Frith
- 2009 – Bare Bones – Madeleine Peyroux
- 2010 – Eye to Ear III – Fred Frith
- 2012 – Secrets of Secrets – Aaron Novik
- 2015 – Orphic Machine – Ben Goldberg
- 2020 – Super Meat Boy Forever - RIDICULON
- 2021 – The Binding of Isaac: Repentance – RIDICULON
- 2022 – Séances – Trevor Dunn's Trio-Convulsant avec Folie à Quatre
- 2026 – Mewgenics – RIDICULON

== See also ==
- Romantic Warriors II: A Progressive Music Saga About Rock in Opposition
- Romantic Warriors II: Special Features DVD
