= Lily-O =

Studio album by Sam Amidon
- Released: 2014
- Recorded: Greenhouse Studios, Reykjavík
- Genre: Folk
- Length: 47:09
- Label: Nonesuch Records
- Producer: Valgeir Sigurðsson

Sam Amidon chronology
Bright Sunny South (2013)	Lily-O (2014)	The Following Mountain (2017)

Professional ratings
Review scores
Source	Rating
Wondering Sound	4/5 stars
Pitchfork	5.9/10 stars
The Guardian	4/5 stars
Paste Magazine	8.4/10 stars
All Music	4/5 stars
music OMH	4.5/5 stars
PopMatters	7/10 stars
Irish Times	4/5 stars
Blurt	4/5 stars

Lily-O is the fifth album by singer and multi-instrumentalist Sam Amidon. The album is a collection of reworked folksongs, arranged and sung by Amidon, accompanying himself on guitar and banjo, with a band consisting of Bill Frisell, Shahzad Ismaily and Chris Vatalaro. The album was recorded and mixed by Valgeir Sigurðsson at Greenhouse Studios in Reykjavík, Iceland and was released on Nonesuch Records in 2014.

== Background and recording ==
Lily-O emerged from Amidon's collaboration with guitarist Bill Frisell, who had been a hero of Amidon's since his youth. Starting in 2011, Frisell and Amidon collaborated in an array of contexts, starting with Amidon's appearing as a guest with Frisell's Beautiful Dreamers Trio in Ludwigsburg, Germany; a brief duo tour of the Northeastern US by the two musicians; and a concert by Frisell featuring Amidon, jazz pianist Jason Moran, and singer Alicia Hall Moran at Jazz at Lincoln Center. For the Lily-O album, Amidon decided to bring Frisell to Iceland to record at Greenhouse Studios with Amidon's longtime collaborators Shahzad Ismaily on electric bass and Chris Vatalaro on drums and live electronics. Amidon did not share the songs with the band beforehand but instead taught them as they went, with the group's arrangements coming together as they recorded. The band recorded their tracks live on the floor over the course of three days, with very few overdubs.

== Release and reception ==
All Music Guide stated that Lily-O may be the finest hour of Amidon's well-refined approach to the seemingly endless well of public domain folk songs, offering some of his most beautiful and daring arrangements yet." The New York Times called it "A hauntingly beautiful new album." The Wondering Sound review said that "Amidon is doing to folk what Arthur Russell did to disco and dance music: the components are taken context-free and mixed around." Amidon toured the album extensively including a 10-day US tour with Frisell and Ismaily, with shows at San Francisco's Great American Music Hall and Brooklyn's Music Hall of Williamsburg, and an appearance on the NPR Tiny Desk Concert.

== Track listing ==
All songs composed by Sam Amidon/Traditional, arranged by Sam Amidon, except track 2 composed by Sam Amidon; track 9 by Rosa Lee Watson, arranged by Sam Amidon; track 10 music by Sam Amidon/Alexander Johnson (1818), lyric by Isaac Watts (1719).

1. "Walkin' Boss" – 3:30
2. "Down the Line" – 4:47
3. "Blue Mountains" – 5:17
4. "Pat Do This, Pat Do That" – 3:21
5. "Lily-O" – 8:53
6. "Groundhog Variations" – 3:25
7. "Won't Turn Back" – 5:17
8. "Maid Lamenting" – 2:52
9. "Your Lone Journey" – 4:22
10. "Devotion" – 5:25

== Personnel ==
- Sam Amidon – vocals, banjo, acoustic guitar, fiddle
- Bill Frisell – Electric guitar
- Shahzad Ismaily – Electric bass, Moog Synth on "Pat Do This, Pat Do That"
- Chris Vatalaro – drums, electronics, keyboards; flutes on "Pat Do This, Pat Do That," piano on "Won't Turn back"
- engineered, mixed and mastered by Valgeir Sigurðsson
- Additional engineering by Paul Evans and John Spiker
- cover photo – "Swat Valley Picnic" by Peter Smith
