= Faithful Fairy Harmony =

Studio album by Josephine Foster
- Released: November 16, 2018
- Studio: Bomb Shelter Studios, Nashville, Tennessee, USA
- Genre: Folk
- Length: 1:16:02

Josephine Foster chronology
More Amor (2016)	Faithful Fairy Harmony (2018)	No Harm Done (2020)

Professional ratings
Aggregate scores
Source	Rating
Metacritic	80/100
Review scores
Source	Rating
AllMusic	4/5 stars
The Guardian	4/5 stars
PopMatters	7/10

Faithful Fairy Harmony is the ninth studio album by American singer-songwriter Josephine Foster. It was released on November 18, 2018, by Fire Records.

== Critical reception ==
Faithful Fairy Harmony was met with "generally favorable" reviews from critics. At Metacritic, which assigns a weighted average rating out of 100 to reviews from mainstream publications, this release received an average score of 80 based on 7 reviews. Aggregator Album of the Year gave the release a 73 out of 100 based on a critical consensus of 4 reviews.

Bekki Bemrose of AllMusic said: "The mysteries of love, life, and the world are broached with a light yet nevertheless unshakeable touch on Faithful Fairy Harmony. Foster has made a record that feels like a psychic connection to inner worlds as well as an outer one, and the visions she summons are at once vivid and rarified."

== Track listing ==
Faithful Fairy Harmony track listing
No.	Title	Length
1.	"Soothsayer"	3:30
2.	"A Little Song"	3:38
3.	"The Virgin of the Snow"	6:38
4.	"Pearl in Oyster"	1:51
5.	"Benevolent Spring"	3:20
6.	"Force Divine"	2:40
7.	"All Plales Next to You"	4:43
8.	"Lord of Love"	7:11
9.	"Eternity"	3:54
10.	"Indian Burn"	3:55
11.	"The Peak of Paradise"	3:59
12.	"Adieu Color Adieu"	5:33
13.	"Pining Away"	5:11
14.	"Challenger"	4:04
15.	"I Was Glad"	3:03
16.	"Shepherd Moon of Starry Height"	4:23
17.	"Little Lamb"	3:37
18.	"Faithful Fairy Harmony"	4:52

== Personnel ==
Credits adapted from AllMusic.

'Musicians

- Josephine Foster – primary artist, producer, harp, organ
- John Allingham – bass, backing vocals
- Chris Davis – drums
- Jon Estes – bass
- Shahzad Ismaily – bass
- Peggy Snow – kazoo
- Victor Herrero – guitar

Production

- John Baldwin – mastering
- Andrija Tokic – engineer, mixing
