= Ragged Atlas =

Studio album by Cosa Brava
- Released: March 5, 2010
- Recorded: December 2008
- Studio: Tiny Telephone, San Francisco
- Genre: Experimental rock; free improvisation
- Length: 62:11
- Label: Intakt (Switzerland)
- Producer: Fred Frith, Intakt Records

Cosa Brava chronology
Ragged Atlas (2010)	The Letter (2012)

Ragged Atlas is a studio album by Fred Frith's United States experimental rock group Cosa Brava. It was recorded in San Francisco in December 2008 and was released by Intakt Records in Switzerland on March 5, 2010. Ragged Atlas was the band's first album, and is largely instrumental with a little singing on five of the thirteen the tracks. Frith composed all the music, with lyric contributions on "Lucky Thirteen" by Rebby Sharp, a singer/guitarist Frith had worked with in Orthotonics.

== Reception ==
Professional ratings
Review scores
Source	Rating
All About Jazz	5/5 stars
AllMusic	3.5/5 stars
Clouds and Clocks	mixed

John Kelman, Nic Jones and Mark Corroto wrote favorable reviews of Ragged Atlas at All About Jazz, whereas Beppe Colli at Clouds and Clocks had mixed feeling about the album.

Kelman described Cosa Brava as "the perfect nexus between [Frith's] more accessible yet still left-leaning music for dance, [...] and the more challenging structures of his 1970s work with Henry Cow". He said that Ragged Atlas "transcends time and genre" and has "[b]road dynamics, a blend of acoustic and electric instrumentation, fine compositional detail, and surprisingly memorable melodies". Kelman said that it "stands as one of 2010's most auspicious debuts".

Corroto called the album a "classic 1970s rock opera", and described the music as a mixture of "folk, Celtic, modern chamber, Latin, funk, Eastern, and prog-rock". He said that Frith "never stray[ed] far from joyous music making". Jones wrote that there is an "impishness about the music, a sense of fun that [...] stems from the joy of discovery". As an example he said that the "arguably banal lyric" in the track "Falling Up (for Amanda)" is elevated to another level by the supple music of Carla Kihlstedt's violin". Jones said that "Tall Story" works because of the musicianship of the group, and that in lesser hands it "might come off as so much fluff".

Colli was critical of the album, saying that the volume is "deafening", and that the music is "often tacky, bombastic, as if looking for an applause". He did like some of the tracks, for example "Lucky Thirteen", which he said has a "meditative mood, fine unison from vocals and violin", and "Tall Story", with its "light, fine theme". Overall, however, Colli described the album as "kitsch".

== Track listing ==
All tracks are written by Fred Frith, except where noted.

No.	Title	Length
1.	"Snake Eating Its Tail"	2:13
2.	"Round Dance"	3:25
3.	"Pour Albert"	4:36
4.	"R. D. Burman"	4:18
5.	"Falling Up (for Amanda)"	5:38
6.	"Out on the Town with Rusty, 1967"	5:11
7.	"Lucky Thirteen" (Fred Frith, Rebby Sharp)	6:58
8.	"Blimey, Einstein"	4:11
9.	"The New World"	3:57
10.	"Tall Story"	3:49
11.	"For Tom Zé"	4:49
12.	"A Song About Love"	6:24
13.	"Market Day"	6:42

== Track notes ==
Source: CD liner notes written by Frith; all quotes by Frith.

- "Pour Albert" (Albert Marcoeur) – Frith called Marcoeur one of his "favorite" songwriters and musicians, and a "warm and generous friend and teacher".
- "R. D. Burman" (Rahul Dev Burman) – Burman was an Indian film score composer who "fearlessly mixed genres, styles, cultures, and instruments" to create a "unique body of work" spanning a 30-year career.
- "Falling Up (for Amanda)" (Amanda Miller) – Frith described Miller as an "extraordinary dancer, inspiring choreographer, and uncompromising philosopher"; Miller and Frith once led a workshop at the Edinburgh Festival where Miller taught dancers how to "fall up".
- "Out on the Town with Rusty, 1967" – Frith met Rusty ("the epitome of cool") while performing at the York Folk Club in mid-1967; they became friends that summer, played at local Working Men's Clubs, and attended a Jimi Hendrix concert in Woburn, Bedfordshire; a few months later, after Frith had returned to university, Rusty was killed in a motorbike accident.
- "Blimey, Einstein" (Albert Einstein) – "[H]ey, it ain't rocket science."
- "For Tom Zé" (Tom Zé) – Zé inspired Frith with his technique of mixing popular Brazilian song with "wacky" modern composition.

== Personnel ==
- Fred Frith – guitar, bass guitar, vocals
- Carla Kihlstedt – violin, nyckelharpa, bass harmonica, vocals
- Zeena Parkins – accordion, keyboards, foley objects, vocals
- Matthias Bossi – drums, percussion, sruti box, vocals
- The Norman Conquest – sound manipulation

=== Guests ===
- Anantha Krishnan – mridangam and tabla on "R. D. Burman"

=== Recording and production ===
- Recorded on 24-track analog at Tiny Telephone Studios, San Francisco between December 17 and 21, 2008
  - Scott Solter – engineer
  - Laura Dean – assistant engineer
  - The Norman Conquest – digital transfers, track rationalization, additional recording
- Mixed at Jankowski Soundfabrik, Esslingen, Germany in July, August and December 2009
  - Peter Hardt – engineer
- Mastered at Headless Buddha, Oakland, California on January 11, 2010
  - Myles Boisen – engineer
- Artwork
  - Heike Liss – cover image
  - Jonas Schoder – graphic design
- Production
  - Fred Frith – producer
  - Intakt Records – producer
