= Maybe Monday =

American experimental music group

- Origin: United States
- Genres: Electroacoustic improvisation, experimental
- Years active: 1997–present
- Labels: Winter & Winter, Intakt
- Members: Fred Frith; Miya Masaoka; Larry Ochs

Maybe Monday is an American experimental electroacoustic improvisation music ensemble comprising guitarist Fred Frith, koto player Miya Masaoka and saxophonist Larry Ochs. The trio was formed in San Francisco in March 1997 when they performed in a concert at the Great American Music Hall. They have since toured the United States, Canada and Europe, and released three albums between 1999 and 2008.

Their music has been described as a "delicate mesh of electric and acoustic, ethnic and urban, tradition and experiment".

== History ==
The idea behind Maybe Monday was Fred Frith's when he suggested to Miya Masaoka and Larry Ochs that they perform together at a concert in San Francisco in March 1997. Frith, an English multi-instrumentalist, composer and improvisor was a founding member of the English avant-rock group Henry Cow, and was currently Composer-in-Residence in the Music Department at Mills College in Oakland, California. Ochs was a founding member of the San Francisco-based Rova Saxophone Quartet, and Japanese American koto player Masaoka was currently active in jazz, Western classical music, electronic music and traditional Japanese music on the United States West Coast. Masaoka had been a student at Mills College and both Frith and Masaoka had worked with Ochs's Rova Saxophone Quartet.

After their debut performance at the Great American Music Hall, Maybe Monday went on to tour the West Coast and Chicago in 1998. A concert at Frank Lloyd Wright's Unity Temple in Chicago in July 1998 was recorded live and released in 1999 on their debut album, Saturn's Finger.

In 2001, Maybe Monday returned to the San Francisco Bay Area for a series of performances with guest musician Joan Jeanrenaud on cello. One of the concerts in May 2001 at Guerilla Euphorics in Oakland was recorded live and released in 2002 on their second album, Digital Wildlife. The same quartet appeared at the 19th Festival International de Musique Actuelle de Victoriaville in Victoriaville, Quebec, Canada in May 2002. In 2003 the original trio toured Europe, performing in Marseille, Brussels, Nancy, Bordeaux, Lille and Frankfurt.

In November 2006 Maybe Monday made their first New York City appearance at The Stone where they performed with guest musicians Ikue Mori (electronics), Zeena Parkins (harp), Carla Kihlstedt (violin) and Gerry Hemingway (percussion). This septet then went on to record the group's first studio album, Unsquare on November 18, 2006, at East Side Sound in New York City. It was released in January 2008 and was described by one reviewer as "a very rich recording of electro-acoustic improvisation."

== Members ==
- Fred Frith – electric guitar and effects
- Miya Masaoka – koto and electronics
- Larry Ochs – tenor and sopranino saxophone

=== Guest musicians ===
- Joan Jeanrenaud – cello
- Ikue Mori – electronics
- Zeena Parkins – electric harp, electronics
- Carla Kihlstedt – electric and acoustic violin
- Gerry Hemingway – percussion, voice

== Discography ==
- Saturn's Finger (1999, CD, Buzz-Records, Netherlands)
- Digital Wildlife (2002, CD, Winter & Winter, Germany)
- Unsquare (2008, CD, Intakt Records, Switzerland)
