= Jerome Kitzke =

American composer

Jerome Kitzke (born 1955) is a composer who grew up along the southwestern shore of Lake Michigan in South Milwaukee, Wisconsin.

== History ==
He received his B.F.A. from the University of Wisconsin–Milwaukee, and moved to New York City in 1984. In 1992 Kitzke formed his performing group Mad Coyote. His music has also been performed by the Milwaukee Symphony, the New Juilliard Ensemble, Essential Music, Present Music, Earplay, Zeitgeist, Guy Klucevsek, Margaret Leng Tan, ETHEL and Kathleen Supové. Kitzke has received grants from the National Endowment for the Arts, American Music Center, Meet the Composer, ASCAP, and BMI. In 2004 and 2006 he visited the Randolph School in Wappingers Falls, New York to compose music for their shows. He even put music to Allen Ginsberg's poem "Green Automobile", which was included on his most recent album The Paha Sapa Give-Back (Innova Recordings, 2014). He is a quarter Persian.

== Music ==
=== Chamber works ===
- A Keening Wish, narrator and ensemble
- Alone On A Hill in Grandfather Night, mixed trio
- Breath and Bone, accordion solo
- Haunted America, mixed quartet
- In Bone Colored Light, mixed sextet
- Mad Coyote Madly Sings, large mixed ensemble
- Present Music, large mixed ensemble
- Regina Takes the Holy Road, 3 December 1994, mixed quintet
- She Left in the Crow Black Night, clarinet, unac
- Teeth of Heaven, mixed sextet
- The Big Gesture, mixed trio
- The Character of American Sunlight, percussion ensemble, mixed quintet
- The Earth Only Endures, percussion solo
- The Paha Sapa Give-Back, piano and ensemble, percussion ensemble
- The Redness of Blood, mixed quartet
- We Need to Dream All This Again, mixed quintet
- Winter Count, narrator and ensemble

=== Vocal works ===
- 171st Chorus, medium voice
- Box Death Hollow, vocal soloists and ensemble, men's chorus and ensemble

=== Solo Piano ===
- Sunflower Sutra
- The Animist Child

=== Musical Theatre ===
- The Paha Sapa Give-Back
- Woope
