= Salt River (album) =

Studio album by Sam Amidon
- Released: January 24, 2025
- Genre: Folk; country
- Length: 43:42
- Label: River Lea
- Producer: Sam Gendel

Sam Amidon chronology
Sam Amidon (2020)	Salt River (2025)

Singles from Salt River
- 1. "I'm On My Journey Home" Released: October 24, 2024; 2. "Friends and Neighbors" Released: December 12, 2024; 3. "Golden Willow Tree" Released: January 21, 2025

Salt River is the ninth studio album by American singer Sam Amidon. It was released on January 24, 2025, via River Lea Records. It is Amidon's first album release since his 2020 eponymous album, Sam Amidon.

== Background ==
Salt River was produced by American saxophonist Sam Gendel. It features the singles "I'm On My Journey Home", "Friends and Neighbors", and "Golden Willow Tree", which were released on October 24, 2024, December 12, 2024, and January 21, 2025, respectively. Amidon described it as "a campfire, but the campfire is around Sam Gendel's synthesizer".

== Reception ==
Professional ratings
Review scores
Source	Rating
The Observer	3/5 stars
AllMusic	4/5 stars
The Skinny	4/5 stars
Pitchfork	7.3/10 stars
MusicOMH	3.5/5 stars
Hot Press	8/10 stars

The Observer rated the album three stars out of five, stating "As a domestic get-together, the album’s enjoyable enough, but actual magic is in short supply," while music website AllMusic described it as "trippy, bucolic, sophisticated, and simple, like a dream about a folksong." The Skinny added that "Salt River blurs the boundary between tradition and modernity," giving it four stars out of five. Pitchfork gave the album a rating of 7.3 out of 10 and wrote that "overall, this is another fine example of Amidon’s capacious, bracingly simple definition of the genre yoked to him." London-based magazine MusicOMH described Salt River as "another successful example of Amidon drawing on his folk upbringing and creating something very much on his own terms," and gave it a rating of 3.5 out of 5. Will Russell of the Dublin-based magazine, Hot Press, gave a rating of eight out of ten to the album and remarked "vintage effort from US folk merchant."

== Track listing ==
All tracks are written by Salt River track listing.

No.	Title	Writer(s)	Length
1.	"Oldenfjord"	Grey Larsen	1:45
2.	"Three Five"	Traditional; Sam Amidon; Sam Gendel	4:18
3.	"Big Sky"	Lou Reed	3:59
4.	"Tavern"	Amidon; Gendel; Philippe Melanson	3:14
5.	"Golden Willow Tree"	Traditional	7:36
6.	"I'm on My Journey Home"	Traditional	4:16
7.	"Ask the Elephant"	Yoko Ono	2:01
8.	"Cusseta"	Traditional; Amidon; Gendel	5:51
9.	"Friends and Neighbors"	Ornette Coleman	6:02
10.	"Never"	Traditional; Amidon	4:41
Total length:			43:42

=== Notes ===
- "Tavern" incorporates the traditional song "Salt River".
- "I'm on My Journey Home" incorporates the 1859 shape note song "I'm on My Journey Home" by Sarah Lancaster.
- "Cusseta" incorporates the 1844 shape note song "Cusseta" by John Massengale.
- "Never" incorporates the fiddle song "Her Long Dark Hair Flowing Down Her Back" by Junior Crehan.

== Personnel ==
Credits adapted from the album's liner notes.

- Sam Amidon – guitars (tracks 1, 2, 5–10), voice (2, 3, 5–10), fiddle (3, 4, 8, 10)
- Sam Gendel – production, engineering, mixing (all tracks); synthesizer (1–5), soprano saxophone (1); guitar, additional electronic percussion, alto saxophone (3); wind controller (6, 10), organ (7); sarune bolon, additional voice (9); artwork, design
- Philippe Melanson – electronic percussion (all tracks), shakers (6), additional vocals (9)
- Marcella Cytrynowicz – additional vocals (9)
- Mike Bozzi – mastering
- Leo Abrahams – vocal engineering (tracks 2, 3, 5, 6, 8)
