= Unsquare =

Studio album by Maybe Monday
- Released: January 2008
- Recorded: November 18, 2006
- Studio: East Side Sound Studio, New York City
- Genre: Avant-garde jazz; free improvisation
- Length: 60:25
- Label: Intakt (Switzerland)
- Producer: Larry Ochs, Intakt Records

Maybe Monday chronology
Digital Wildlife (2002)	Unsquare (2008)

Unsquare is a 2008 studio album by Maybe Monday, a San Francisco based experimental electroacoustic improvisation music ensemble featuring guitarist Fred Frith, koto player Miya Masaoka and saxophonist Larry Ochs. It is their third album and includes guest musicians Gerry Hemingway, Carla Kihlstedt, Ikue Mori and Zeena Parkins. Unsquare was recorded at East Side Sound Studio in New York City on November 18, 2006, and was released by Intakt Records in Switzerland in January 2008.

== Reception ==
Professional ratings
Review scores
Source	Rating
DownBeat	4/5 stars

In a review of Unsquare at All About Jazz, Kurt Gottschalk called Maybe Monday "a ridiculously strong trio", and described their collaboration with Hemingway, Kihlstedt, Mori and Parkins on this album as "a dizzying, fascinating set of music". Clifford Allen wrote at Bagatellen that Maybe Monday are not unlike the British free improvisation group AMM. He noted that which instruments are producing which sound is not important – it is the combination of those sounds that matters, the "subsuming of the parts to the whole". Allen added that "to parse Unsquare would be a disservice to the breadth of its canvas – this is a very rich recording of electro-acoustic improvisation." Jason Bivins wrote in Cadence that the inclusion of the four guests "unsettl[ed] the group in just the right ways and thicken[ed] the sound provocatively". He was impressed that they did this "without weighing the music down or sacrificing space". Bivins described Unsquare as a "very fine record".

Reviewing Unsquare in DownBeat, Bill Shoemaker was initially concerned that the presence of guests on Maybe Monday's third album would upset the "alluringly precarious elegance and intensity" of their earlier work. But he was pleased at how "keenly ensemble-minded" the guests are, and that they appear to have "infallible instincts for when less is more and when more is much more". The album's pieces "pivot between sparseness and density, altering a consistently bracing mix of acoustic and electronic elements". Shoemaker felt that the way the instruments connect, "the twacks of koto and low-register harp; the gravelly drones of guitar and laptop; the smudges of reeds and bowed strings", explains the growing interest in electro-acoustic improvisation.

== Track listing ==
All tracks composed by Maybe Monday.

No.	Title	Length
1.	"G"	14:46
2.	"Nitrogen"	14:07
3.	"Saptharishi Mandalam"	7:52
4.	"Septentrion"	6:17
5.	"Unturned"	17:21

Sources: Liner notes, Discogs.

== Personnel ==
- Fred Frith – electric guitar
- Miya Masaoka – 25 string koto, electronics
- Larry Ochs – sopranino and tenor saxophones

Guests

- Gerry Hemingway – drums, percussion, voice
- Carla Kihlstedt – electric and acoustic violins
- Ikue Mori – electronics
- Zeena Parkins – electric harp, electronics

Sources: Liner notes, Discogs.

=== Sound and artwork ===
- Recorded at East Side Sound Studio, New York City on November 18, 2006
- Mixed at Ruminator Audio, San Francisco
- Mastered at Headless Buddha Mastering Lab, Oakland, California
- Marc Urselli – engineer
- Monte Vallier – mixing
- Larry Ochs – mixing, producer, liner notes
- Myles Boisen – mastering
- Intakt Records – producer
- Emilie Clark – cover art
- Jonas Schoder – graphic design

Sources: Liner notes, Discogs.
