= The Letter (Cosa Brava album) =

Studio album by Cosa Brava
- Released: March 2012
- Recorded: June 2010, August 2011
- Studio: Chàteau de Faverolles, France; New Improved Recording, Oakland, California
- Genre: Experimental rock; avant-rock; free improvisation
- Length: 61:08
- Label: Intakt (Switzerland)
- Producer: Fred Frith, Intakt Records

Cosa Brava chronology
Ragged Atlas (2010)	The Letter (2012)	Z Sides (2024)

The Letter is a studio album by Fred Frith's United States experimental rock group Cosa Brava. It was recorded in France in June 2010 and Oakland, California in August 2011, and was released by Intakt Records in Switzerland on March 21, 2012.

== Reception ==
Professional ratings
Review scores
Source	Rating
All About Jazz	favourable
AllMusic	4/5 stars

Writing at All About Jazz, John Eyles described The Letter as "transcend[ing] genre", and Frith's songs as "melodic ... provid[ing] the group with plenty of scope for embellishment". He said the album "hangs together well", adding that Kihlstedt's violin has "inflections carrying great emotional weight", and Frith's guitar as "fluid [and] interwoven with wordless vocals, to stunning effect" on "Common Sense".

== Track listing ==
All tracks are written by Fred Frith, except where noted.

No.	Title	Length
1.	"Soul of the Machine"	2:12
2.	"The Eyjafjallajökull Tango"	6:48
3.	"Drowning" (Fred Frith, Zeina Nasr)	4:04
4.	"The Wedding"	6:08
5.	"The Letter" (Frith, Nasr)	3:41
6.	"Slings and Arrows"	7:23
7.	"Jitters"	5:13
8.	"For Lars Hollmer"	8:03
9.	"Emigrants"	4:06
10.	"Nobody Told Me"	4:10
11.	"Common Sense"	7:15
12.	"Soul of the Machine (reprise)"	2:05

Source: Intakt Records, Discogs

== Personnel ==
- Fred Frith – guitar, bass guitar, voice
- Carla Kihlstedt – violin, bass harmonica, voice
- Zeena Parkins – accordion, keyboards, foley objects, voice
- Shahzad Ismaily – bass guitar, voice
- Matthias Bossi – drums, percussion, mayhem, vocals
- The Norman Conquest – sound manipulation

=== Guests ===
- Michael Elrod – tambura (track 4)
- William Winant – concert bass drum (track 10), crotales (track 2)

=== Recording and production ===
- Tracks 1, 2, 4, 5, 6, 8, 11, 12 recorded at Chàteau de Faverolles, France, June 1–4, 2010
  - The Norman Conquest – engineer
- Tracks 3, 7, 9, 10 recorded at New Improved Recording, Oakland, California, August 9–11, 2011
  - The Norman Conquest – engineer
- Mixed at Jankowski Soundfabrik, Esslingen, Germany, April 9–11, 2011, July 4–5, 2011, January 31, 2012, February 3, 2012
  - Peter Hardt – engineer
- Mastered at Headless Buddha, Oakland, California, February 10, 2012
  - Myles Boisen – engineer
- Artwork
  - Heike Liss – cover image
  - Jonas Schoder – graphic design
- Production
  - Fred Frith – producer
  - Intakt Records – producer

Source: Intakt Records, Discogs
