= A Wolf in Sheep's Clothing (Josephine Foster album) =

Studio album by Josephine Foster
- Released: April 11, 2006
- Genre: Folk, psychedelic folk
- Length: 43:25
- Label: Locust Records
- Producer: Josephine Foster

Josephine Foster chronology
Hazel Eyes, I Will Lead You (2005)	A Wolf in Sheep's Clothing (2006)	This Coming Gladness (2008)

Professional ratings
Review scores
Source	Rating
Allmusic	3.5/5 stars
Pitchfork Media	(7.9/10)
Tiny Mix Tapes	4.5/5 stars

A Wolf in Sheep's Clothing is the third solo studio album by singer-songwriter Josephine Foster, released in 2005. The album is irregular in that it is written in a German form known as "Lieder", or art songs. Foster utilizes the compositions of Johannes Brahms and Franz Schubert, icons of the Romantic Era, while her lyrics are based upon the texts of writers like Johann Wolfgang von Goethe or Eduard Mörike.

== Track listing ==
No.	Title	Writer(s)	Length
1.	"An die Musik"	Schubert/Schober	6:19
2.	"Der König in Thule"	Schubert/Goethe	4:50
3.	"Verschwiegene Liebe"	Wolf/Eichendorff	7:07
4.	"Die Schwestern"	Brahms/Mörike	5:04
5.	"Wehmut"	Schumann/Eichendorff	4:16
6.	"Auf einer Burg"	Schumann/Eichendorff	11:45
7.	"Nähe des Geliebten"	Schubert/Goethe	2:56
