= Z Sides =

Studio album by Cosa Brava
- Released: September 23, 2024
- Recorded: March–May 2008, May 2012
- Genre: Experimental rock; free improvisation
- Length: 46:39
- Label: Klanggalerie (Austria)
- Producer: Fred Frith

Cosa Brava chronology
The Letter (2012)	Z Sides (2024)

Z Sides is a 2024 studio album by Fred Frith's United States experimental rock group Cosa Brava. It comprises a sound collage of extracts from live mixes of the band's musical improvisations performed on tour between March 2008 and May 2012.

== Background ==
Z Sides was conceived by The Norman Conquest (aka Norman Teale), Cosa Brava's sound manipulator who created soundscapes for the group's music, and live mixes during their concerts. Cosa Brava's live songs often contained segments of improvised music, and The Norman Conquest assembled a collection of extracts from these improvisations performed in concerts between March 2008 and their last European tour in May 2012. Using these extracts, Fred Frith and The Norman Conquest built a sound collage to create "an imaginary stand-alone performance" that they called Z Sides.

== Reception ==
Cosa Brava's two previous albums were generally well received by critics, with All About Jazz describing their music as "somewhere between folk, Celtic, modern chamber, Latin, funk, Eastern, and prog-rock". Eyal Hareuveni at salt peanuts* noted that Z Sides is very different from Cosa Brava's two studio albums and their "genre-defying" songs. She wrote, "Z Sides distills and reimagines the infinite musical imagination of Cosa Brava and proves that beauty is indeed an elusive and strange thing." A reviewer at Squidear wrote Z Sides "captures the group's dynamic interplay and remarkable inventiveness".

== Track listing ==
All tracks are written by Cosa Brava.

No.	Title	Length
1.	"Vinljubo"	6:24
2.	"Stagraink"	2:57
3.	"Vivial"	3:30
4.	"Zueberi"	3:40
5.	"Genevial"	2:21
6.	"Koegra"	2:45
7.	"Nuregra"	5:25
8.	"Veniena"	4:27
9.	"Bolnunium"	2:30
10.	"Oklanial"	3:24
11.	"Bezuinbonur"	5:30
12.	"Boljana"	3:46

== Personnel ==
- Fred Frith – guitar, bass guitar (2008), voice
- Matthias Bossi – drums, voice
- Carla Kihlstedt – violin, voice
- Zeena Parkins – keyboards, voice
- Shahzad Ismaily – bass guitar (2012)
- The Norman Conquest – creative live sound

=== Recording and production ===
- The Norman Conquest – concept, editing
- Fred Frith – editing, production, photography
- Lisa Robotka – layout

== Recording locations ==
Improvisations used on this album were extracted from the following Cosa Brava concerts:

- March 20, 2008 – 21 Grand, Oakland, California
- April 7, 2008 – Porgy and Bess, Vienna, Austria
- April 8, 2008 – Cankarjev Dom, Ljubljana, Slovenia
- April 9, 2008 – Teatro Fondamenta Nuove, Venice, Italy
- April 17, 2008 – Rote Fabrik, Zurich, Switzerland
- April 19, 2008 – AMR Jazz Club, Geneva, Switzerland
- May 16, 2008 – Festival International de Musique Actuelle de Victoriaville (FIMAV), Victoriaville, Quebec
- May 11, 2012 – Hall Toll, Stavanger, Norway
- May 12, 2012 – Norrlandsopernmusicbox Black Box, Umeå, Sweden
- May 13, 2012 – Stadtgarten, Cologne, Germany
- May 14, 2012 – Tafelhalle, Nuremberg, Germany
- May 15, 2012 – Generalmusikdirektion, Graz, Austria
- May 16, 2012 – Progr, Turnhalle, Bern, Switzerland
- May 18, 2012 – Treibhaus, Innsbruck, Austria
- May 18, 2012 – The Moods, Zürich, Switzerland
- May 19, 2012 – Teatro San Leonardo, Bologna, Italy
