= Joan Jeanrenaud =

American cellist

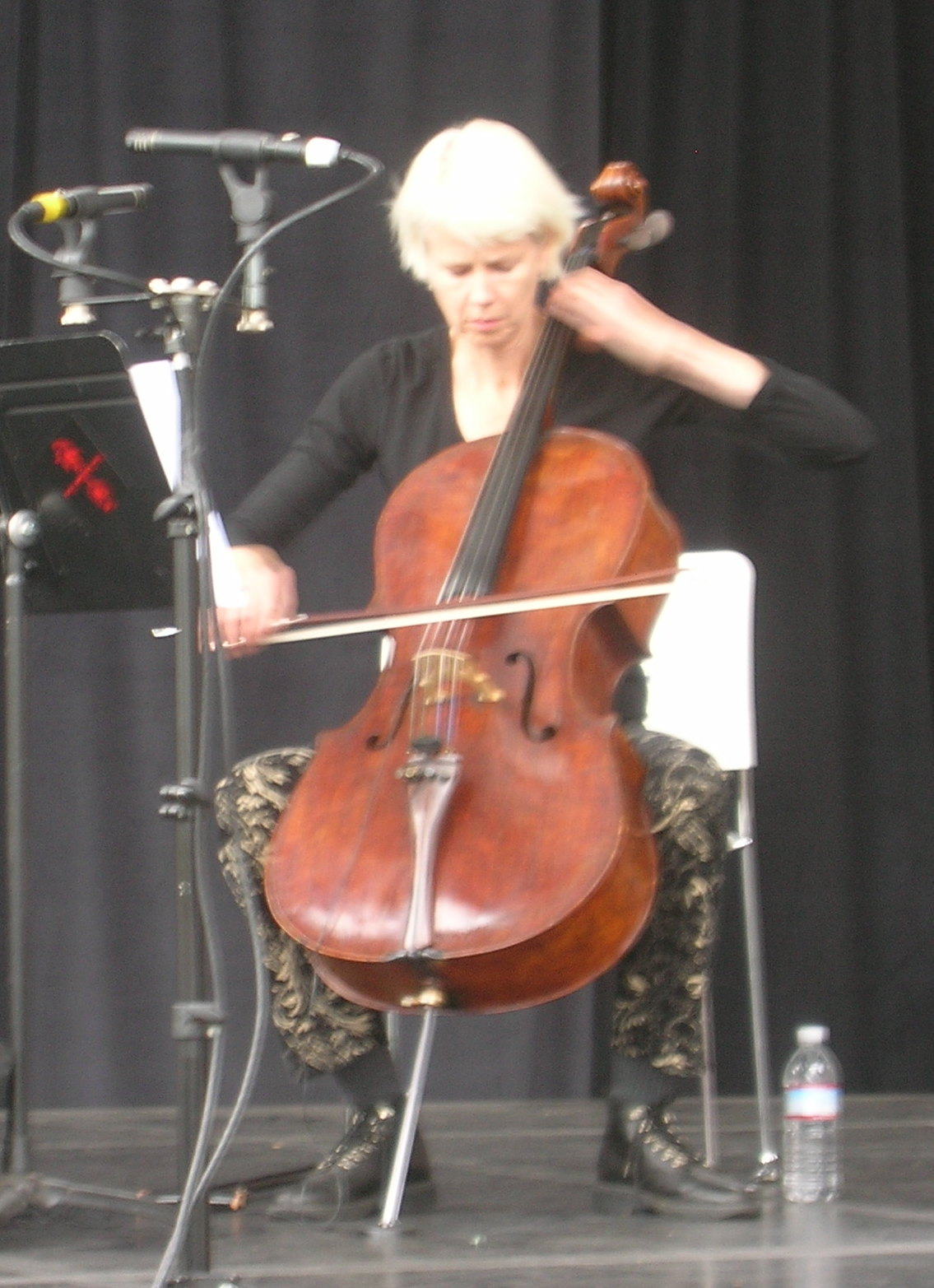
- Jeanrenaud in 2008

Background information
- Born: Joan Dutcher; January 25, 1956 (age 70); Memphis, Tennessee, U.S.
- Genres: Avant-garde
- Instrument: Cello
- Years active: 1978–present
- Website: Official website

Joan Jeanrenaud (née Dutcher; born January 25, 1956) is an American cellist. A native of Memphis, Tennessee, she played with the Kronos Quartet from 1978 until 1999, when, after a sabbatical, she left to pursue a solo career and collaborations with other artists, in part due to being diagnosed with multiple sclerosis. She has staged and recorded solo performance pieces, playing the cello in tandem with electronic instruments. Her first solo album, Metamorphosis, was described by Greg Cahill in Strings as "visceral, hypnotic, and often compelling."

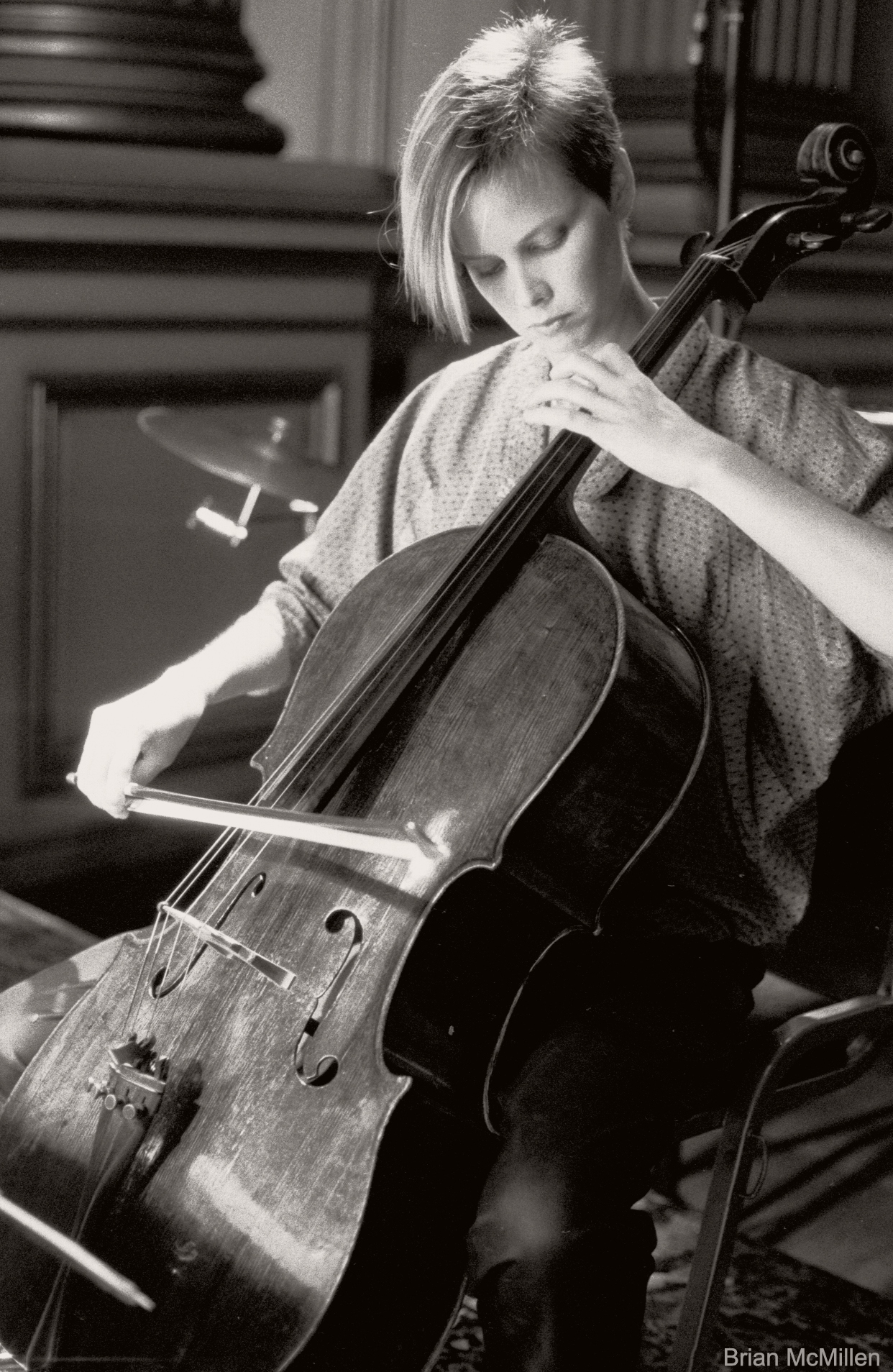
Joan Jeanrenaud w/Kronos Quartet at the San Francisco War Memorial Green Room 9/16/83

Jeanrenaud plays a Deconet, ca. 1750. A copy of the cello carved out of ice was used in her four-hour performance piece Ice Cello, a 2004 adaptation of Charlotte Moorman's Ice Music for London.

In 2008, her album Strange Toys (Talking House Records, 2008) was nominated for a Grammy Award. The album was produced by PC Muñoz, with whom Jeanrenaud later collaborated on another album, Pop-Pop (Deconet Records, 2010), which she called "a pop record that wasn't actually pop."

She also has performed in collaborations with Larry Ochs' group Kihnoua at San Francisco's De Young Museum (2008).

She has performed in many film scores by composer William Susman and appears on the soundtrack CDs for Oil on Ice (2005), Fate of the Lhapa (2007) and Music for Moving Pictures (2009).

== Discography ==
- Metamorphosis (New Albion, 2002)
- Oil On Ice (with William Susman) (Belarca Records, 2004)
- Fly Fly Fly (with Larry Ochs, Miya Masaoka) (Intakt Records, 2004)
- For Birds, Planes & Cello (with Miya Masaoka) (Solitary B, 2005)
- Strange Toys (Talking House Records, 2008)
- Pop-Pop (with PC Muñoz) (Deconet Records, 2010)
- The Sands of Time (with Mark Grey) (Other Minds, 2014)
- Hommage (Other Minds, 2014)
- Visual Music (Deconet Records, 2016)
- Second Time Around (with Charlie Varon) (Deconet Records, 2016)

With Fred Frith and Maybe Monday

- Digital Wildlife (Winter & Winter, 2002)
