= Sam Amidon =

American musician (born 1981)

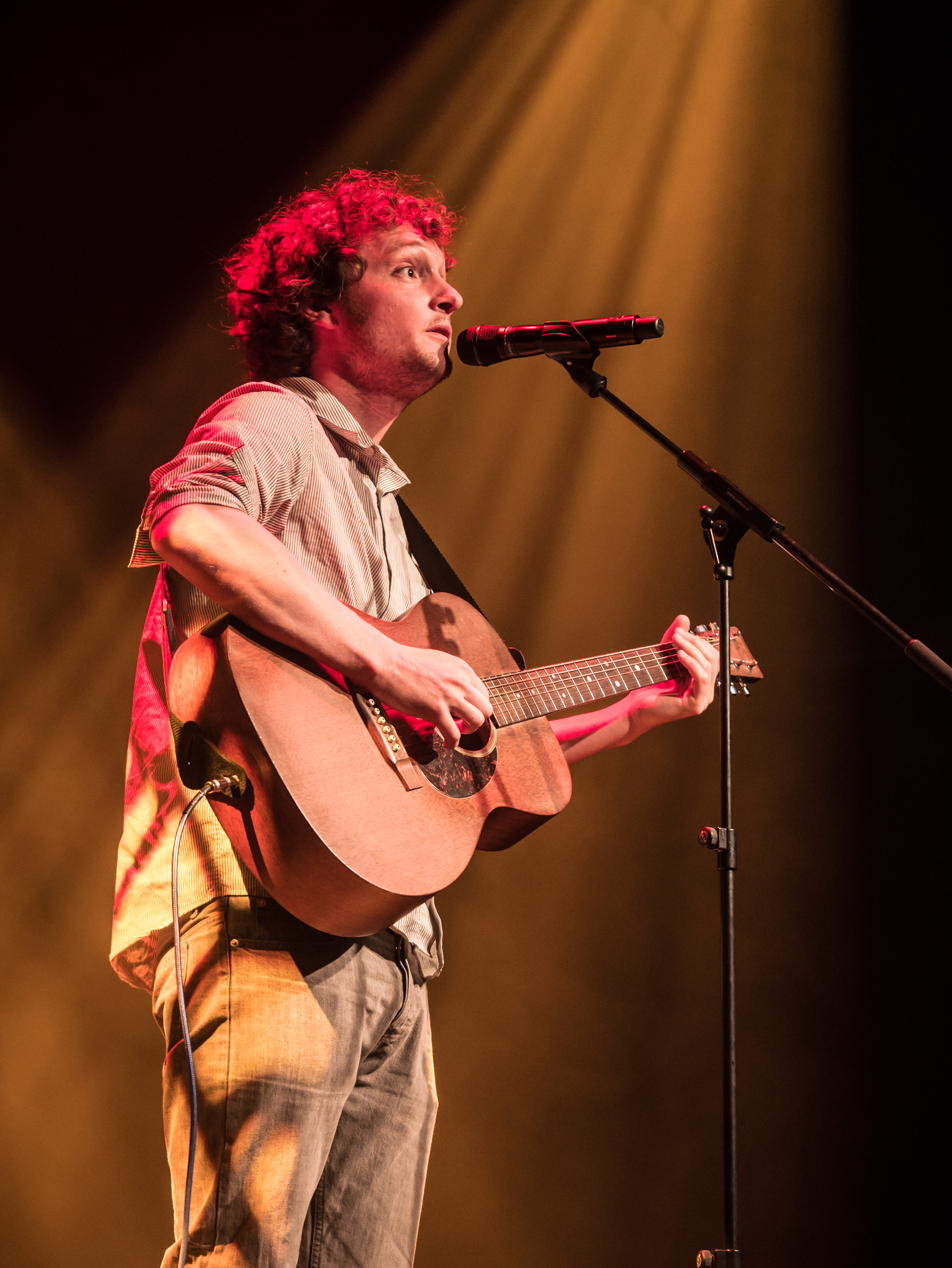
- Amidon at the Moers Festival 2016

Background information
- Born: Samuel Tear Amidon; June 3, 1981 (age 45); Brattleboro, Vermont, United States
- Genre: Folk
- Occupations: Singer; songwriter; multi-instrumentalist
- Instruments: Vocals, guitar, banjo, fiddle
- Labels: Nonesuch, Bedroom Community, Plug Research
- Spouse: Beth Orton
- Website: samamidonmusic.com

Samuel Tear Amidon (born June 3, 1981) is an American singer, songwriter, and multi-instrumentalist.

== Early life ==
Amidon's parents are folk artists Peter Amidon and Mary Alice Amidon. They were members of Bread and Puppet Theater in the 1970s, touring with the group in Europe and living on the Bread and Puppet Farm in Glover, Vermont. They appeared on the 1977 Nonesuch recording Rivers of Delight with the Word of Mouth Chorus, a classic recording of shape-note/Sacred Harp folk hymns by early American composers. His younger brother, Stefan Amidon, is a professional drummer who performs with The Sweetback Sisters among other groups.

Amidon grew up in Brattleboro, Vermont, where he sang in the family band with his parents and played fiddle from the age of 3. By 13 he was playing professionally with pianist Thomas Bartlett, a childhood friend, and with his brother Stefan, in the contradance band Popcorn Behavior. Inspired by groups such as Wild Asparagus and Nightingale, as well as the traditional Irish fiddlers Martin Hayes and Tommy Peoples, Popcorn Behavior released their first album in 1994 when Amidon and Bartlett were 14 and 13, respectively, and Stefan was 10. Keith Murphy joined the group for their third album and the band toured throughout the country, released five albums, and were interviewed on NPR's "All Things Considered", all while the band members were still in high school. Amidon attended The Putney School in Putney, Vermont for one year.

As a teenager, Amidon discovered music by artists such as Tony Conrad, Albert Ayler, Yo La Tengo, Miles Davis and Don Cherry, as well as reissues of field recordings of the Old Weird America such as the Harry Smith Anthology, the Alan Lomax Southern Journey series, and the songs of Dock Boggs. In the early 2000s, he lived in New York City and played in the experimental indie rock bands Doveman and Stars Like Fleas.

== Music career ==
In 2001, Amidon self-released Solo Fiddle, an album of traditional Irish fiddle instrumentals.

Amidon's first album of songs, But This Chicken Proved False Hearted (2007), was made with longtime collaborator Thomas Bartlett and was initially released on the Los Angeles-based electronic label Plug Research. It was reissued on CD and LP in 2015 by Omnivore Recordings.

His second album, All Is Well (2008), was produced, recorded and mixed by Valgeir Sigurðsson at Greenhouse Studios in Iceland and featured orchestral arrangements by Nico Muhly. His third album, I See the Sign (2010), was also produced by Sigurðsson and featured multi-instrumentalist Shahzad Ismaily and orchestral arrangements by Muhly, with guest vocals by Beth Orton. Both albums were released on the Icelandic label/collective Bedroom Community and met with critical acclaim from sources such as Pitchfork, Stylus Magazine and the New York Times, which chose I See the Sign as a top-ten album of 2010.

Amidon's fourth album, Bright Sunny South, produced by Bartlett and Jerry Boys, was released 14 May 2013, his first on Nonesuch Records. His next album, Lily-O, recorded with a band consisting of Ismaily, Bill Frisell, and Chris Vatalaro, was released on the same label on 30 September 2014. "A hauntingly beautiful new album" according to the New York Times, PopMatters called it "a thing of beauty and wonder, bold and strong".

Amidon's next album, The Following Mountain, was released in May 2017, again on Nonesuch Records. It was his first album of original compositions, contrary to his previous work, which mostly reworked existing music.

Amidon has appeared as a guest artist on albums by Tune-Yards, Glen Hansard, Jacob Collier, Mx Justin Vivian Bond, Olof Arnalds, The Blind Boys of Alabama, The National's Grateful Dead Tribute Day Of The Dead, and others. He has also self-published a book, Notes On The Twitterographer.

== Live performances ==
Amidon tours extensively throughout the United States and Canada, Europe, Australia, and Japan, and has appeared at festivals such as End of the Road, Green Man, Roskilde, Lowlands, Pickathon, Solid Sound, Big Ears, Celebrate Brooklyn, The Sydney Festival, the Jaipur Literature Festival, and others. He has become known for freewheeling concert performances, often with Vatalaro and Ismaily.

In 2007 he premiered Muhly's The Only Tune at Carnegie Hall as part of John Adams's In Your Ear festival. He has performed the piece at London's Roundhouse and Barbican, as well as at Cork's Safe Harbour festival in collaboration with the Crash Ensemble. Writing about the recorded version of The Only Tune, which appeared on Muhly's 2008 album Mothertongue, Greil Marcus said, "It's incalculably spooky, the way the action comes out of nowhere, the way Amidon has prepared you to expect nothing."

Between 2002 and 2006, Amidon devised a multimedia program called "Home Alone Inside My Head," consisting of "self-inflicted field recordings," drawn comics, short videos, storytelling and improvisation. He excerpted the project online and performed it in full at experimental music and art spaces around New York City and Brooklyn and beyond, including NYC's The Kitchen and MAD Museum, Monkeytown in Brooklyn, the AVA gallery on NYC's Lower East Side, Cincinnati's CAC, the Kuhturm Gallery in Leipzig, and MASS MoCA in North Adams, MA.

Amidon has performed as part of the Bedroom Community Whale Watching Tour at The Barbican and Reykjavík's Harpa concert hall. He has also appeared in 2015 and 2016 at the Bon Iver-curated Eaux Claires festival in Wisconsin, performing his own music and appearing onstage as guest vocalist with Bon Iver, Richard Reed Parry, and parading the grounds of the festival leading a pop-up "Guitarkestra." In September 2016, Amidon hosted a multi-artist tribute to Pete Seeger at Ireland's National Concert Hall in Dublin, featuring Irish and American artists such as Tommy Sands, Mairead Ni Mhaonaigh, The Voice Squad, Bell X1 and others. Amidon has done collaborative concerts and mini-tours with artists such as Bill Frisell, Nels Cline, Jason Moran, and Marc Ribot. In February 2017 he toured as soloist with the Australian Chamber Orchestra under the direction of Pekka Kuusisto, including performances at the Sydney Opera House, Sydney Recital Hall, and concerts throughout the country. In 2020 he played at the first edition of the Monheim Triennale.

== Personal life ==
Amidon is married to musician Beth Orton. They have a son, Arthur, born in 2011. Based in London, the musicians lived in Los Angeles for several years before returning to the UK.

== Solo discography ==
- Solo Fiddle (2001)
- Home Alone Inside My Head (live multimedia performance, 2003)
- But This Chicken Proved Falsehearted (as Samamidon) (2007 out-of-print; Omnivore Recordings, 2015 re-release)
- All Is Well (as Samamidon) (Bedroom Community, 2008)
- I See the Sign (Bedroom Community, 2010)
- Bright Sunny South (Nonesuch, 2013)
- Lily-O (Nonesuch, 2014)
- The Following Mountain (Nonesuch, 2017)
- Folk Songs (with Kronos Quartet, Nonesuch, 2017)
- Spike Driver Blues (Nonesuch single, 2019)
- Fatal Flower Garden (A Tribute to Harry Smith) (Nonesuch EP, 2019)
- Sam Amidon (2020)
- Salt River (River Lea, 2025)
