= Amy X Neuburg =

American musician

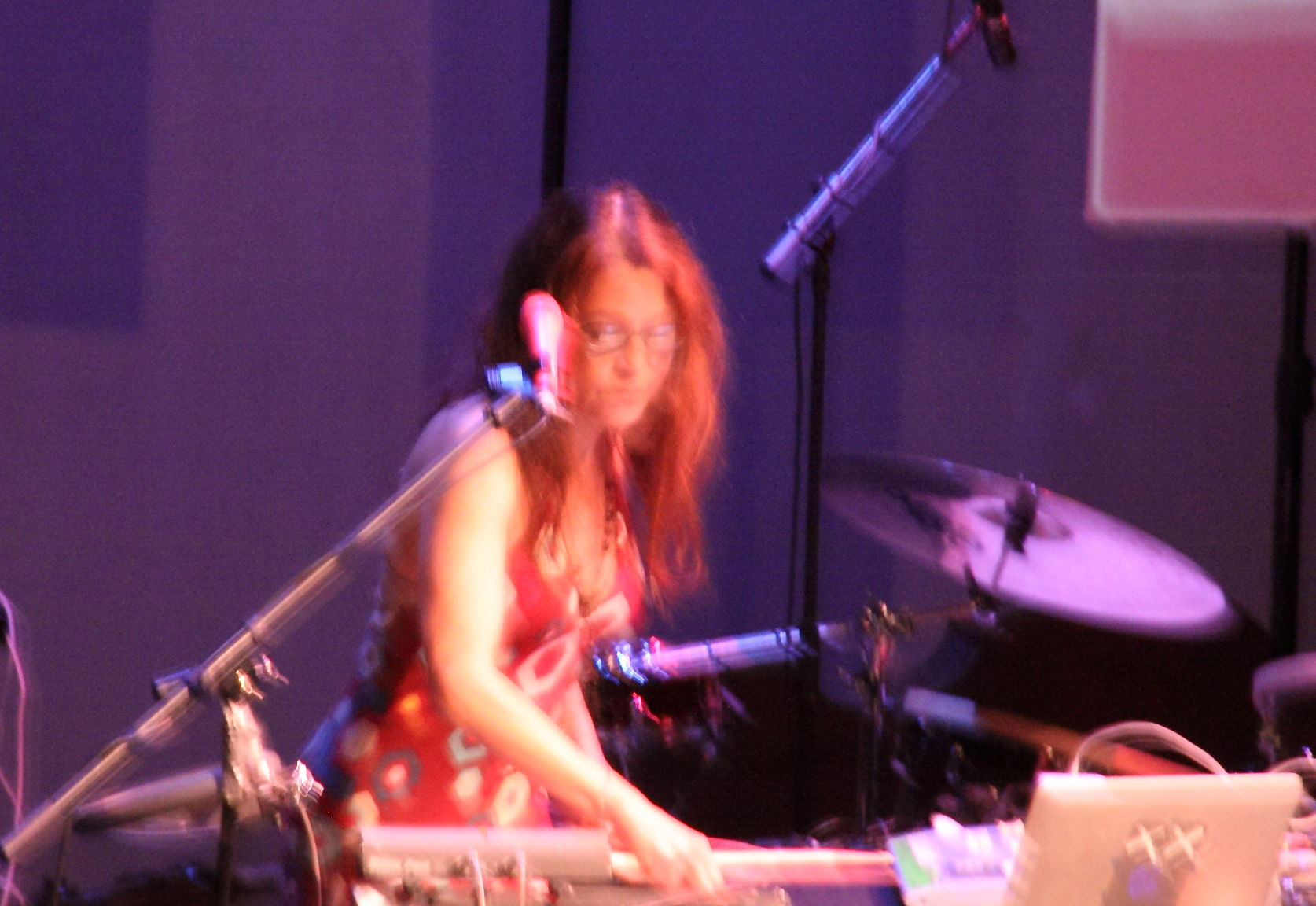
Amy X Neuburg at the Brava Theater in San Francisco.

Amy X Neuburg (born Cheltenham, England) is an American composer, vocalist, and electronic musician.

== Education and career ==
She holds a B.M. degree in voice from the Oberlin Conservatory of Music, a B.A. in linguistics from Oberlin College, and an M.F.A. in electronic music from Mills College, where she studied with Pauline Oliveros and David Rosenboom.

Her solo works combine her singing and speaking voice with electronic loops and samples triggered with electronic drums. Her multi-layered compositions incorporate musical styles including opera, rock, Medieval music, and world music. For ten years she led the experimental band Amy X Neuburg & Men. Neuburg's live-looping works incorporate voice and digital instrument samples, and draw upon compositional traditions such as acousmatic voice and the posthuman vocal subject.

More recently Ms. Neuburg's compositions have focused on chamber and vocal ensembles, often with electronics and her own voice as soloist. She has composed for and sung with the Paul Dresher Ensemble, Solstice vocal ensemble, Del Sol String Quartet, Robin Cox Ensemble, Present Music, and Pacific Mozart Ensemble.

From 2005 to 2010 Amy led the Cello ChiXtet, a group she established to perform her song cycle The Secret Language of Subways.

Neuburg lives in Oakland, California.

== Discography ==
Neuburg's recorded output reflects a polystylistic approach to singing/songwriting.

=== Solo ===
- The Secret Language of Subways
- Residue —2004 (Other Minds)
- Sports! Chips! Booty!
- Utechma
- Songs 91 to 85
