= Clubbo Records =

American record label

Clubbo Records (slogan: "Music to Believe In") is a record label specialising in parodies of various pop music genres from the 1960s to the 2000s. The label is promoted by a website giving detailed fictional information on all of the songs and artists featured as well as mp3s of selected songs by each featured artist.

== History ==
According to the label's website it was founded in the early 1960s by Chet Clubb and Morris "Bo" Bogerman (Clubbo = Clubb + Bo), Clubbo Records is a record label more for small artists. The small company does record and produce professional.

In reality Clubbo is a label founded in 2004 by San Francisco-based musicians Elise Malmberg and Joe Gore. Designer Richie Leeds is responsible for much of the site's design and artwork, although the logo and additional graphics are by Malmberg. In terms of both music and graphics the creators pay meticulous attention to period detail.

== Releases ==
To date Clubbo has released two CDs of music from the website:

- Clubbo - Music to Believe In: Sampler Vol. 1 (2004)
- Clubbo - Music to Believe In: Sampler Vol. 2 (2005)

== See also ==
- List of record labels
