= Josephine Foster =

American singer-songwriter

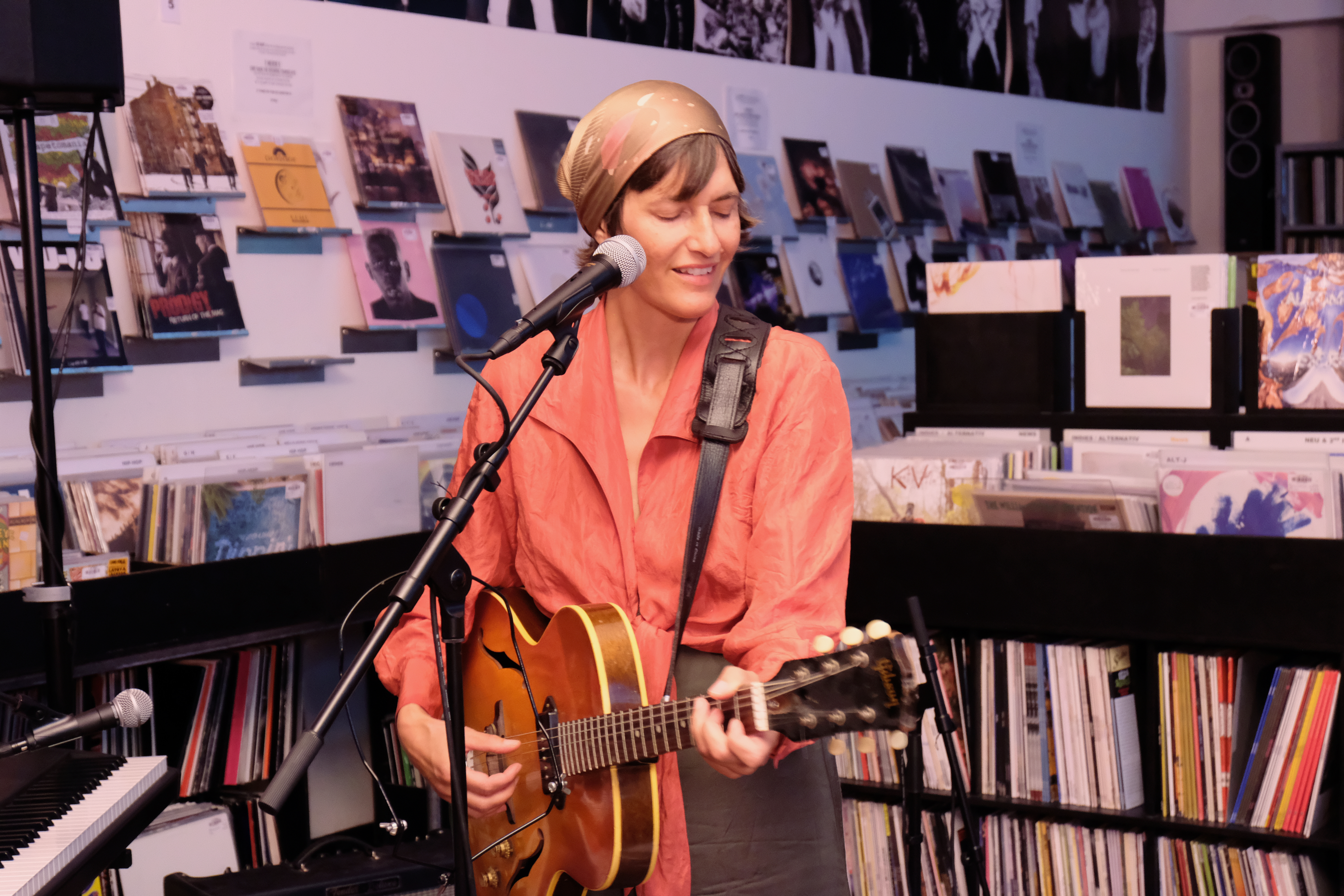

Background information
- Born: Colorado, United States
- Genres: Folk, art song, psychedelic rock, experimental, New Weird America, Americana
- Occupations: Singer, songwriter, musician, music producer
- Instruments: Guitar, piano, harp, organ, autoharp
- Years active: 2000–present
- Labels: Fire Records, Feeding Tube, Drag City, Nyahh, Windbell, Bo' Weavil Recordings, Locust Music
- Website: www.josephinefoster.info

Josephine Foster is an American singer, songwriter, and multi-instrumentalist from Colorado. She is known for her anachronistic voice and work that weaves older styles with the modern, escaping simple classification.

As a teenager, Foster worked as a church singer and aspired to become an opera singer. She moved to Chicago in 1998 to further her opera studies, and began home-recording her songs, resulting in the albums There Are Eyes Above, influenced by Tin Pan Alley, and an album of children's songs, Little Life. She then released collaborative albums with local folk bands The Children's Hour (SOS JFK), Born Heller (S/T), as well as All the Leaves Are Gone, a psychedelic rock album with backing band The Supposed.

A number of solo records followed, including the all acoustic Hazel Eyes, I Will Lead You, an unorthodox collection of 19th century German Lieder titled A Wolf in Sheep's Clothing, and This Coming Gladness, a psychedelic folk-rock album.

Foster released most of her recordings the following decade with Fire Records, including Graphic as a Star, her settings of 27 Emily Dickinson poems.

Thereafter she began to record frequently with engineer Andrija Tokic, who co-produced with Foster her solo albums Blood Rushing, I'm A Dreamer, and Faithful Fairy Harmony; also More Amor, a psych-folk album by her new band Mendrugo formed with Victor Herrero. The latter was Foster's first foray into writing lyrics in Spanish.

Foster lent her voice to the soundtrack for the 2020 film, The World to Come, and sung (as well as co-wrote) the titular song over the end credits. She also played a Shaker singer in The Testament of Ann Lee, also singing on the soundtrack alongside Phil Minton, Shelley Hirsch, Maggie Nicols, Alan Sparhawk, and others.

== Discography ==
=== Studio albums ===
Solo studio albums
Title	Album details
There Are Eyes Above	Released: 2000; Label: Self-released
Little Life	Released: 2001; Label: Self-released
Hazel Eyes, I Will Lead You	Released: 2005; Label: Locust Music
A Wolf in Sheep's Clothing	Released: 2006; Label: Locust Music
This Coming Gladness	Released: 2008; Label: Bo’ Weavil Recordings
Graphic as a Star	Released: 2009; Label: Fire Records
Anda Jaleo	Released: 2010; Label: Fire Records
Blood Rushing	Released: 2012; Label: Fire Records
Perlas	Released: 2013; Label: Fire Records
I'm A Dreamer	Released: 2017; Label: Fire Records
No More Lamps in the Morning	Released: 2016; Label: Fire Records
Faithful Fairy Harmony	Released: 2019; Label: Fire Records
No Harm Done	Released: 2020; Label: Fire Records
Godmother	Released: 2022; Label: Fire Records
Domestic Sphere	Released: 2023; Label: Fire Records

=== Collaborative albums ===
Collaborative albums
Title	Album details
SOS JFK (with The Children's Hour)	Released: 2003; Label: Self-released
Born Heller (with Born Heller)	Released: 2003; Label: Locust Music
All the Leaves Are Gone (with The Supposed)	Released: 2004; Label: Locust Music
Mystery Meet (with The Cherry Blossoms)	Released: 2020 (recorded 2007); Label: Feeding Tube Records
More Amor (with Mendrugo)	Released: 2016; Label: Fire Records
Stars of Tennessee (with The Cherry Blossoms)	Released: 2022; Label: Feeding Tube Records
Going Home (with The Children's Hour)	Released: 2024 (recorded 2003); Label: Drag City; Notes: Featuring David Pajo and Andrew Bar
