= My Brilliant Friend (TV series) =

2018 Italian-American television series

- Genre: Drama; Coming-of-age
- Created by: Saverio Costanzo
- Based on: Neapolitan Novels by Elena Ferrante
- Written by: Elena Ferrante; Francesco Piccolo; Laura Paolucci; Saverio Costanzo
- Directed by: Saverio Costanzo; Alice Rohrwacher; Daniele Luchetti; Laura Bispuri
- Starring: Gaia Girace; Margherita Mazzucco; Alba Rohrwacher; Irene Maiorino; (See full cast list)
- Narrated by: Alba Rohrwacher
- Composer: Max Richter
- Countries of origin: Italy; United States
- Original languages: Neapolitan; Italian
- No. of seasons: 4
- No. of episodes: 34

Production
- Executive producers: Lorenzo Mieli; Domenico Procacci; Mario Gianani; Guido De Laurentiis; Elena Recchia; Jennifer Schuur; Paolo Sorrentino; Saverio Costanzo
- Producers: Luigi Mariniello; Sara Polese; Laura Paolucci; Daria Hensemberger; Francesco Nardella; Giulio Luciani
- Production locations: Metropolitan City of Naples; Province of Caserta; Province of Latina; Province of Pisa; Metropolitan City of Milan; Metropolitan City of Florence
- Cinematography: Fabio Cianchetti; Hélène Louvart; Ivan Casalgrandi; Vladan Radovic
- Editors: Francesca Calvelli; Carlotta Cristiani; Stefano Mariotti; Annalisa Forgione; Matteo Mossi
- Camera setup: Single-camera
- Running time: 43–67 minutes
- Production companies: Wildside; Fandango; Umedia (s. 1–2); The Apartment Pictures (s. 2–4); Mowe (s. 2, 4); Fremantle (s. 3–4)

Original release
- Network: HBO (US); Rai 1 (Italy); TIMvision (Italy, s. 1)
- Release: November 18, 2018 – November 11, 2024

My Brilliant Friend (Italian: L'amica geniale) is a Neapolitan- and Italian-language coming-of-age drama television series created by Saverio Costanzo for HBO, RAI, and TIMvision. Named after the first of four novels in the Neapolitan Novels series by Elena Ferrante, the series is an adaptation of the entire literary work into four seasons. My Brilliant Friend is a co-production between Italian production companies Wildside, Fandango, The Apartment Pictures, Mowe and international film groups Umedia and Fremantle.

The first two episodes of the series were presented at the 75th Venice International Film Festival on September 2, 2018. The first season, based on the first novel in the series, premiered on HBO on November 18, 2018, and on Rai 1 and TIMvision on November 27, 2018. In December 2018, the series was renewed for a second season, based on the second novel in the series, The Story of a New Name. The second season premiered on Rai 1 on February 10, 2020, and on HBO on March 16, 2020. The first two episodes of the second season were screened in selected Italian cinemas from January 27 to 29, 2020.

In April 2020, the series was renewed for a third season, based on the third novel in the series, Those Who Leave and Those Who Stay. The third season premiered on Rai 1 on February 6, 2022, and on HBO on February 28, 2022. In March 2022, the series was renewed for a fourth and final season, based on the final novel in the series, The Story of the Lost Child. The first two episodes of the fourth and final season made its world premiere at the Tribeca Festival on August 20, 2024, and were presented at the 19th Rome Film Festival on October 25, 2024. The ten-episode fourth and final season premiered on HBO on September 9, 2024, and on Rai 1 on November 11, 2024.

== Cast and characters ==
=== Main ===
- Elisa Del Genio (season 1; guest season 2), Margherita Mazzucco (seasons 1–3), Alba Rohrwacher (season 4; cameo season 3; narration seasons 1–4), and Elisabetta De Palo (Note: Dubbed by Alba Rohrwacher in season 4) (featured season 4; guest season 1) as Elena "Lenù" Greco
- Ludovica Nasti (season 1; guest season 2), Gaia Girace (seasons 1–3; special appearance season 4), and Irene Maiorino (season 4) as Raffaella "Lila" Cerullo
- Anna Rita Vitolo as Immacolata Greco
- Luca Gallone as Vittorio Greco
- Imma Villa as Manuela Solara (seasons 1–3)
- Antonio Milo as Silvio Solara (season 1; recurring season 2)
- Valentina Acca as Nunzia Cerullo (seasons 1–2, 4)
- Antonio Buonanno as Fernando Cerullo (seasons 1–3; recurring season 4)
- Dora Romano as Miss Oliviero (seasons 1–2)
- Alessio Gallo (seasons 1–3) and Edoardo Pesce (season 4) as Michele Solara
- Nunzia Schiano as Nella Incardo (seasons 1–2)
- Giovanni Amura as Stefano Carracci (seasons 2–3; recurring season 1)
- Gennaro De Stefano (season 2; recurring season 1) and Salvatore Striano (season 4) as Rino Cerullo
- Francesco Serpico (seasons 2–3; recurring season 1) and Fabrizio Gifuni (season 4) as Giovanni "Nino" Sarratore
- Federica Sollazzo as Pinuccia Carracci (season 2; recurring season 1)
- Clotilde Sabatino as Professor Galiani (seasons 2–3)
- Ulrike Migliaresi as Ada Cappuccio (season 2; recurring season 1)
- Christian Giroso as Antonio Cappuccio (season 2; recurring season 1)
- Eduardo Scarpetta as Pasquale Peluso
- Giovanni Buselli (seasons 2–3; recurring season 1) and Pio Stellaccio (season 4) as Enzo Scanno
- Giovanni Cannata as Armando Galiani (seasons 2–3)
- Francesco Russo as Bruno Soccavo (seasons 2–3)
- Bruno Orlando (seasons 2–3) and Stefano Dionisi (season 4) as Franco Mari
- Daria Deflorian as Adele Airota (seasons 2–4)
- Matteo Cecchi (seasons 2–3) and Pier Giorgio Bellocchio (season 4) as Pietro Airota
- Giulia Mazzarino (season 3; recurring season 2) and Sonia Bergamasco (season 4) as Maria Rosa Airota
- Gabriele Vacis as Guido Airota (season 3; recurring seasons 2, 4)
- Maria Vittoria Dallasta as Silvia (season 3)
- Riccardo Palmieri as Gino (season 3; recurring seasons 1–2)
- Giorgia Gargano as Nadia Galiani (season 3; recurring season 2, featured season 4)
- Fabrizio Cottone (season 3; recurring seasons 1–2) and Renato De Simone (season 4) as Alfonso Carracci
- Rosaria Langellotto as Gigliola Spagnuolo (season 3; recurring seasons 1–2)
- Pina Di Gennaro as Melina Cappuccio (season 3; recurring seasons 1–2, 4)
- Francesca Pezzella as Carmela "Carmen" Peluso (season 3; recurring seasons 1–2)
- Sofia Luchetti (season 3), Vittoria Cozza (season 4) and Ludovica Rita Di Meglio (season 4) as Adele "Dede" Airota
- Salvatore Tortora as Gennaro "Gennarino" Carracci (season 3)
- Elvis Esposito (season 3; recurring seasons 1–2) and Lino Musella (season 4) as Marcello Solara
- Francesca Montuori (season 3) and Claudia Tranchese (season 4) as Elisa Greco
- Chiara Celotto as Eleonora Sarratore (season 3)
- Sophia Protino (season 3), Fatima Credendino (season 4) and Adriana Trotta (season 4) as Elsa Airota

=== Featured ===
The following actors are credited in the opening titles of a single episode of the series:

- Antonio Pennarella as Don Achille Carracci (season 1)
- Edu Rejón as Juan (season 3)
- Giulia Pica as a doctor (season 3)
- Claudio Lardo as Giuntini (season 3)
- Mirko Setaro as Lila's cardiologist (season 3)
- Vittorio Ciorcalo as Lila's neurologist (season 3)
- Giovanni Toscano as Mario's friend (season 3)
- Eugenio Di Fraia as Mario Gioia (season 3)
- Rebecca Fanucchi as Clelia (season 3)
- Iacopo Ricciotti as Maria Rosa's boyfriend (season 3)

== Episodes ==
Season	Subtitle	Episodes	Originally released	
Season	Subtitle	Episodes	First released	Last released
1	—	8	November 18, 2018 (HBO); November 27, 2018 (Rai 1)	December 10, 2018 (HBO); December 18, 2018 (Rai 1)
2	The Story of a New Name; Storia del nuovo cognome	8	February 10, 2020 (Rai 1); March 16, 2020 (HBO)	March 2, 2020 (Rai 1); May 4, 2020 (HBO)
3	Those Who Leave and Those Who Stay; Storia di chi fugge e di chi resta	8	February 6, 2022 (Rai 1); February 28, 2022 (HBO)	February 27, 2022 (Rai 1); April 18, 2022 (HBO)
4	The Story of the Lost Child; Storia della bambina perduta	10	September 9, 2024 (HBO); November 11, 2024 (Rai 1)	November 11, 2024 (HBO); December 9, 2024 (Rai 1)

=== Season 1 (2018) ===
No. overall	No. in season	Title	Directed by	Written by	Original release date	U.S./Italy viewers (millions)
1	1	"The Dolls" "Le bambole"	Saverio Costanzo	Elena Ferrante, Francesco Piccolo, Laura Paolucci and Saverio Costanzo	November 18, 2018 (HBO); November 27, 2018 (Rai 1)	0.242 and 7.458
Writer Elena "Lenù" Greco learns that her old friend Rafaella "Lila" Cerullo has vanished. Elena records her memories of their friendship, starting from when they were both promising students in Maestra Oliviero's class in a poor Naples neighborhood in the 1950s. The two are paired up for a contest against two students from the boys' class, Elena's crush Nino Sarratore and Alfonso, the younger son of neighborhood crime boss and grocer Don Achille. The girls become friends after Elena helps Lila after another neighborhood boy, Enzo, throws stones at her. Meanwhile, Melina, a mad widow, causes disturbance with her affair with Donato, Nino's father. The Sarratores eventually move away. While playing, Lila and Elena impulsively throw their dolls into Don Achille's cellar and attempt to retrieve them, though are spooked and run away. Don Achille gives them money to replace the dolls, which they decide to hide.
2	2	"The Money" "I soldi"	Saverio Costanzo	Elena Ferrante, Francesco Piccolo, Laura Paolucci and Saverio Costanzo	November 19, 2018 (HBO); November 27, 2018 (Rai 1)	0.128 and 6.729
Elena and Lila buy and read Little Women, increasingly aware of the violent Camorra-associated Solara family. The local families discuss their children continuing on to middle school. Elena's parents allow her to take the admission exam, while Lila's parents refuse to let her continue studying. Lila convinces Elena to skip school to walk to the sea, but changes her mind midway. The two are caught in a rainstorm and Elena's father hits her for the infraction. Lila temporarily stops attending school after speaking out of turn, and reappears to gift Elena a story she had written titled "The Blue Fairy". She declares her intention to take the test, but is beaten badly by her father Fernando. Elena passes the admissions exam with high marks and is congratulated by her family. The neighborhood learns that Don Achille has been murdered. Alfredo Peluso is arrested for it, despite claiming innocence. Lila suspects the Solaras' involvement.
3	3	"Metamorphoses" (Note: HBO listings translate the titles of episodes 3 and 4 as "The Metamorphoses" and "Dissolving Margins", respectively.) "Le metamorfosi"	Saverio Costanzo	Elena Ferrante, Francesco Piccolo, Laura Paolucci and Saverio Costanzo	November 25, 2018 (HBO); December 4, 2018 (Rai 1)	0.244 and 7.302
Elena and her peers are now teenagers, and Elena is bothered by Lila's distance. The girls watch the Solara brothers Michele and Marcello coerce their friend Ada for a car ride and Lila declares that she will not let herself be used by them. The brothers beat Antonio, Ada's brother, for standing up for her. Elena, embarrassed to admit she is struggling with Latin, is surprised to learn from the local librarian, Maestro Ferraro, that Lila is independently learning the language. Lila gives Elena advice that helps the latter improve. At an awarding ceremony for the library, Elena realizes that Lila has been voraciously checking out library books. She goes with Pasquale, son of Alfredo and a Communist, to give the prize books to Lila. Elena is inspired by Donato's gift of a book of poems to Melina. Lila and her brother Rino show Elena a men's traveling shoe they have secretly designed and intend to start a factory with. Meanwhile, Maestra Oliviero convinces Elena's parents to let her go to high school.
4	4	"Dissolving Boundaries" "La smarginatura"	Saverio Costanzo	Elena Ferrante, Francesco Piccolo, Laura Paolucci and Saverio Costanzo	November 26, 2018 (HBO); December 4, 2018 (Rai 1)	0.151 and 6.725
The neighborhood families attend a party for the name day of Gigliola Spagnuolo, a classmate of Elena and Lila. Pasquale, Enzo, Marcello, and Stefano (Don Achille's older son, who runs the local grocery) all express interest in Lila. Marcello orders Pasquale to leave and cuts into his dance with Lila, offending Pasquale, who tries to rile up their friend group against the Solaras. Pasquale begins educating Lila on neighborhood politics and history. Elena begins high school and realizes that Nino is attending the same academy. She impresses her Greek teacher, Professor Garace. Envious of Lila, Elena agrees to date her classmate Gino. Lila and Rino continue working on their shoe. Stefano invites the neighborhood youth to a New Year's Eve party, during which the boys get caught up in a fireworks contest with the Solara brothers. Here, Lila first experiences a phenomenon she will later refer to as "dissolving boundaries".
5	5	"The Shoes" "Le scarpe"	Saverio Costanzo	Elena Ferrante, Francesco Piccolo, Laura Paolucci and Saverio Costanzo	December 2, 2018 (HBO); December 11, 2018 (Rai 1)	0.291 and 6.699
Fernando scolds Lila and Rino for daring to construct a shoe. Elena continues to excel in school and breaks up with Gino. Lila confides in Elena that she had rejected love confessions from Pasquale and Marcello. Elena, Lila, Rino, Pasquale and his sister Carmela go into the city for ice cream. Uncomfortable with the area's wealth, Rino picks a fight with a rich boy and his friends, while Marcello and Michele come to their aid. Marcello starts visiting Lila and her family; her parents approve of the courtship because of the Solaras' wealth. Elena accepts an invitation from Maestra Oliviero's cousin to spend the summer on the island of Ischia.
6	6	"The Island" "L'isola"	Saverio Costanzo	Elena Ferrante, Francesco Piccolo, Laura Paolucci and Saverio Costanzo	December 3, 2018 (HBO); December 11, 2018 (Rai 1)	0.210 and 6.699
Elena does the housekeeping for Maestra Oliviero's cousin Nella and mostly keeps to herself. Nella's English guests are surprisingly replaced by the Sarratore family, and Elena begins to accompany them on their outings. She bonds with Nino, learning that he dislikes his father and had always admired Lila. On the eve of his departure, Nino kisses Elena on the beach. On Elena's birthday, Lila finally writes back to tell her that Marcello has continued spending time with her family and giving her lavish gifts. Marcello threatens her when she attempts to return a gifted ring. Elena decides to leave early to help Lila. Later that night, Donato assaults Elena.
7	7	"The Fiancés" "I fidanzati"	Saverio Costanzo	Elena Ferrante, Francesco Piccolo, Laura Paolucci and Saverio Costanzo	December 9, 2018 (HBO); December 18, 2018 (Rai 1)	0.318 and 6.974
8	8	"The Promise" "La promessa"	Saverio Costanzo	Elena Ferrante, Francesco Piccolo, Laura Paolucci and Saverio Costanzo	December 10, 2018 (HBO); December 18, 2018 (Rai 1)	0.228 and 6.620

=== Season 2: The Story of a New Name (2020) ===
No. overall	No. in season	Title	Directed by	Written by	Original release date	U.S./Italy viewers (millions)
9	1	"The New Name" "Il nuovo cognome"	Saverio Costanzo	Elena Ferrante, Francesco Piccolo, Laura Paolucci and Saverio Costanzo	February 10, 2020 (Rai 1); March 16, 2020 (HBO)	0.148 and 7.099
10	2	"The Body" "Il corpo"	Saverio Costanzo	Elena Ferrante, Francesco Piccolo, Laura Paolucci and Saverio Costanzo	February 10, 2020 (Rai 1); March 23, 2020 (HBO)	0.147 and 6.452
11	3	"Erasure" "Scancellare"	Saverio Costanzo	Elena Ferrante, Francesco Piccolo, Laura Paolucci and Saverio Costanzo	February 17, 2020 (Rai 1); March 30, 2020 (HBO)	0.120 and 6.842
12	4	"The Kiss" "Il bacio"	Alice Rohrwacher	Elena Ferrante, Francesco Piccolo, Laura Paolucci and Saverio Costanzo	February 17, 2020 (Rai 1); April 6, 2020 (HBO)	0.141 and 6.235
13	5	"The Betrayal" "Il tradimento"	Alice Rohrwacher	Elena Ferrante, Francesco Piccolo, Laura Paolucci and Saverio Costanzo	February 24, 2020 (Rai 1); April 13, 2020 (HBO)	0.196 and 6.585
14	6	"Rage" "La rabbia"	Saverio Costanzo	Elena Ferrante, Francesco Piccolo, Laura Paolucci and Saverio Costanzo	February 24, 2020 (Rai 1); April 20, 2020 (HBO)	0.134 and 6.053
15	7	"Ghosts" "I fantasmi"	Saverio Costanzo	Elena Ferrante, Francesco Piccolo, Laura Paolucci and Saverio Costanzo	March 2, 2020 (Rai 1); April 27, 2020 (HBO)	0.159 and 7.110
16	8	"The Blue Fairy" "La fata blu"	Saverio Costanzo	Elena Ferrante, Francesco Piccolo, Laura Paolucci and Saverio Costanzo	March 2, 2020 (Rai 1); May 4, 2020 (HBO)	0.130 and 6.757

=== Season 3: Those Who Leave and Those Who Stay (2022) ===
No. overall	No. in season	Title	Directed by	Written by	Original release date	U.S./Italy viewers (millions)
17	1	"Indecencies" "Sconcezze"	Daniele Luchetti	Elena Ferrante, Francesco Piccolo, Laura Paolucci and Saverio Costanzo	February 6, 2022 (Rai 1) (Note: The first two episodes of the third season were released online in Italy on February 4, 2022.); February 28, 2022 (HBO)	0.130 and 4.837
18	2	"The Fever" "La febbre"	Daniele Luchetti	Elena Ferrante, Francesco Piccolo, Laura Paolucci and Saverio Costanzo	February 6, 2022 (Rai 1); March 7, 2022 (HBO)	0.149 and 4.475
19	3	"The Treatment" "La cura"	Daniele Luchetti	Elena Ferrante, Francesco Piccolo, Laura Paolucci and Saverio Costanzo	February 13, 2022 (Rai 1); March 14, 2022 (HBO)	0.124 and 4.940
20	4	"Cold War" "Guerra fredda"	Daniele Luchetti	Elena Ferrante, Francesco Piccolo, Laura Paolucci and Saverio Costanzo	February 13, 2022 (Rai 1); March 21, 2022 (HBO)	0.141 and 4.753
21	5	"Terror" "Terrore"	Daniele Luchetti	Elena Ferrante, Francesco Piccolo, Laura Paolucci and Saverio Costanzo	February 20, 2022 (Rai 1); March 28, 2022 (HBO)	0.077 and 4.669
22	6	"Becoming" "Diventare"	Daniele Luchetti	Elena Ferrante, Francesco Piccolo, Laura Paolucci and Saverio Costanzo	February 20, 2022 (Rai 1); April 4, 2022 (HBO)	0.049 and 4.589
23	7	"Try Again" "Ancora tu"	Daniele Luchetti	Elena Ferrante, Francesco Piccolo, Laura Paolucci and Saverio Costanzo	February 27, 2022 (Rai 1); April 11, 2022 (HBO)	0.108 and 4.294
24	8	"Those Who Leave, Those Who Stay" "Chi fugge, chi resta"	Daniele Luchetti	Elena Ferrante, Francesco Piccolo, Laura Paolucci and Saverio Costanzo	February 27, 2022 (Rai 1); April 18, 2022 (HBO)	0.074 and 4.112

=== Season 4: The Story of the Lost Child (2024) ===
No. overall	No. in season	Title	Directed by	Written by	Original release date	U.S./Italy viewers (millions)
25	1	"The Separation" "La separazione"	Laura Bispuri	Elena Ferrante, Francesco Piccolo, Laura Paolucci and Saverio Costanzo	September 9, 2024 (HBO); November 11, 2024 (Rai 1)	N/A and 3.968
26	2	"Dispersion" (Note: HBO listings translate the titles of episodes 2, 4, 5 and 10 as "The Dispersion", "The Earthquake", "The Fracture" and "Restitution", respectively.) "La dispersione"	Laura Bispuri	Elena Ferrante, Francesco Piccolo, Laura Paolucci and Saverio Costanzo	September 16, 2024 (HBO); November 11, 2024 (Rai 1)	N/A and 3.332
27	3	"Compromises" "I compromessi"	Laura Bispuri	Elena Ferrante, Francesco Piccolo, Laura Paolucci and Saverio Costanzo	September 23, 2024 (HBO); November 18, 2024 (Rai 1)	N/A and 3.612
28	4	"Earthquake" "Terremoto"	Laura Bispuri	Elena Ferrante, Francesco Piccolo, Laura Paolucci and Saverio Costanzo	September 30, 2024 (HBO); November 18, 2024 (Rai 1)	N/A and 3.200
29	5	"The Break" "La frattura"	Laura Bispuri	Elena Ferrante, Francesco Piccolo, Laura Paolucci and Saverio Costanzo	October 7, 2024 (HBO); November 25, 2024 (Rai 1)	N/A and 3.619
30	6	"The Cheat" "L'imbroglio"	Laura Bispuri	Elena Ferrante, Francesco Piccolo, Laura Paolucci and Saverio Costanzo	October 14, 2024 (HBO); November 25, 2024 (Rai 1)	N/A and 3.190
31	7	"The Return" "Il ritorno"	Laura Bispuri	Elena Ferrante, Francesco Piccolo, Laura Paolucci and Saverio Costanzo	October 21, 2024 (HBO); December 2, 2024 (Rai 1)	N/A and 3.125
32	8	"The Investigation" "L'indagine"	Laura Bispuri	Elena Ferrante, Francesco Piccolo, Laura Paolucci and Saverio Costanzo	October 28, 2024 (HBO); December 2, 2024 (Rai 1)	N/A and 3.125
33	9	"The Disappearance" "La scomparsa"	Laura Bispuri	Elena Ferrante, Francesco Piccolo, Laura Paolucci and Saverio Costanzo	November 4, 2024 (HBO); December 9, 2024 (Rai 1)	N/A and 3.314
34	10	"The Restitution" "La restituzione"	Laura Bispuri	Elena Ferrante, Francesco Piccolo, Laura Paolucci and Saverio Costanzo	November 11, 2024 (HBO); December 9, 2024 (Rai 1)	N/A and 2.814

== Production ==
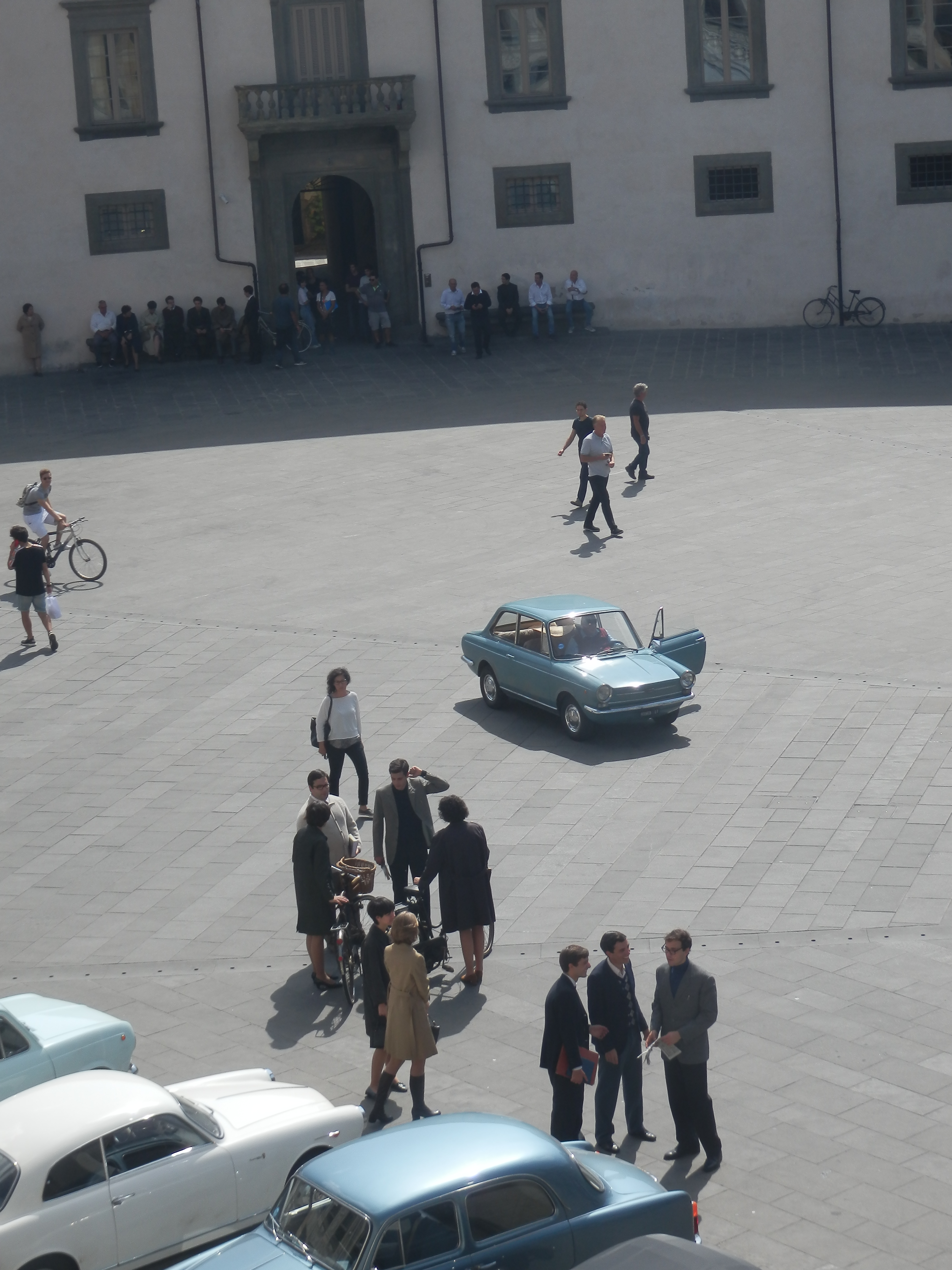
Filming of the second season at Piazza dei Cavalieri, Pisa in 2019

Commissioned by Rai Fiction, HBO and TIMvision, the first season was produced by Italian production companies Wildside and Fandango and international film group Umedia. TIMvision withdrew from the project after the first season, while production companies The Apartment Pictures and Mowe joined production for the second season.

On February 18, 2020, Gaia Girace announced that she would leave the series after playing Lila in three episodes of the third season, as a new and older actress would be cast for the following episodes. However, the director of the third season, Daniele Luchetti, later opted to retain Girace and Mazzucco for the duration of the season.

== Music ==
The score of the series was composed by Max Richter.

=== Season 1 ===
My Brilliant Friend (TV Series Soundtrack)

Soundtrack album by Max Richter
- Released: December 7, 2018
- Genre: Soundtrack
- Length: 36:15
- Label: Deutsche Grammophon

Max Richter chronology
Mary Queen of Scots (Original Motion Picture Soundtrack) (2018)	My Brilliant Friend (TV Series Soundtrack) (2018)	Ad Astra (Original Motion Picture Soundtrack) (2019)

Singles from My Brilliant Friend (TV Series Soundtrack)
- 1. "Elena & Lila" Released: November 30, 2018

The soundtrack album for the first season was released by Deutsche Grammophon on December 7, 2018, for digital download. It was preceded by the release of the single "Elena & Lila" on November 30, 2018.

Track listing

No.	Title	Length
1.	"Elena & Lila"	4:53
2.	"Whispers"	3:41
3.	"Your Reflection"	3:35
4.	"The Days Go By"	2:43
5.	"Interior Dialogues"	1:37
6.	"In the Dark"	2:30
7.	"In Spite of All"	2:10
8.	"Brilliant Clouds"	1:11
9.	"In Remembrance of You"	4:57
10.	"Shimmering Clouds"	1:15
11.	"She Was Running"	2:08
12.	"Our Reflection"	5:35
Total length:		36:15

Additional music

The first season features additional material from Richter's solo discography.

All music is composed by Max Richter.

No.	Title	Writer(s)	Length
1.	"Spring 1" (from the album Recomposed by Max Richter: Vivaldi – The Four Seasons, 2012)	Max Richter, Antonio Vivaldi	2:31
2.	"Summer 2" (from the album Recomposed by Max Richter: Vivaldi – The Four Seasons, 2012)	Richter, Vivaldi	3:59
3.	"Cypher" (from the single Cypher, 2018)		7:43
4.	"Aria 2 – Pt. 1" (from the album Sleep, 2015)		1:19
5.	"Infra 5" (from the album Infra, 2010)		5:16
6.	"Infra 8" (from the album Infra, 2010)		3:21
7.	"Love Song (Cascade)" (from the album Perfect Sense, 2011)		1:02
8.	"Organum" (from the album The Blue Notebooks, 2004)		3:13
9.	"Dream 13 (Minus Even)" (from the album From Sleep, 2015)		8:52
10.	"Vladimir's Blues" (from the album The Blue Notebooks, 2004)		1:18
11.	"Iconography" (from the album The Blue Notebooks, 2004)		3:38
12.	"Chorale/Glow – Pt. 1" (from the album Sleep, 2015)		2:00
13.	"Circles from The Rue Simon – Crubellier" (from the album 24 Postcards in Full Colour, 2008)		1:04
14.	"Dream 19 (Pulse) – Pt. 6" (from the album Sleep, 2015)		3:17
15.	"Interior Dreams an Idea" (from the album Henry May Long, 2009)		2:18
16.	"Kierling/Doubt" (from the album 24 Postcards in Full Colour, 2008)		0:50
17.	"Space 11 (Invisible Pages Over)" (from the album From Sleep, 2015)		5:15
18.	"Space 17 (Chains) – Pt. 7" (from the album Sleep, 2015)		1:08
19.	"Space 21 (Petrichor)" (from the album From Sleep, 2015)		4:47
20.	"Sublunar – Pt. 1" (from the album Sleep, 2015)		1:29

=== Season 2 ===
My Brilliant Friend, Season 2 (TV Series Soundtrack)

Soundtrack album by Max Richter
- Released: May 1, 2020
- Genre: Soundtrack
- Length: 54:51
- Label: Deutsche Grammophon

Max Richter chronology
Ad Astra (Original Motion Picture Soundtrack) (2019)	My Brilliant Friend, Season 2 (TV Series Soundtrack) (2020)	Voices (2020)

The soundtrack album for the second season was released by Deutsche Grammophon on May 1, 2020, for digital download. The soundtrack features material from Richter's solo discography.

Track listing

No.	Title	Length
1.	"Elena and Lila (Titles Season 2)"	1:13
2.	"Sub Piano (MBF Version)" (from the album Infra, 2010)	0:49
3.	"Protest March (Pt. 1)"	1:09
4.	"Protest March (Pt. 2)"	2:32
5.	"Organum (MBF Version)" (from the album The Blue Notebooks, 2004)	3:15
6.	"Leo (MBF Version)" (from the reissue of the album Songs from Before, 2014)	2:11
7.	"She Won't Answer"	2:35
8.	"The Young Mariner (MBF Version)" (from the album Henry May Long, 2009)	4:06
9.	"Harmonium (MBF Version)" (from the album Songs from Before, 2006)	4:25
10.	"Cinema Music"	6:28
11.	"Don't Put Sad Ideas In My Head / All By Themselves"	3:21
12.	"Winter 2 (MBF Version)" (from the album Recomposed by Max Richter: Vivaldi – The Four Seasons, 2012)	2:53
13.	"Return 16 (time capsule) [Edit]" (from the album Sleep, 2015)	9:14
14.	"moth-like stars (Edit)" (from the album Sleep, 2015)	10:40
Total length:		54:51

=== Season 3 ===
My Brilliant Friend, Season 3 (Original Soundtrack)

Soundtrack album by Max Richter
- Released: March 4, 2022
- Genre: Soundtrack
- Length: 29:47
- Label: Deutsche Grammophon

Max Richter chronology
Invasion (Music from the Original TV Series: Season 1) (2021)	My Brilliant Friend, Season 3 (Original Soundtrack) (2022)	The New Four Seasons – Vivaldi Recomposed (2022)

The soundtrack album for the third season was released by Deutsche Grammophon on March 4, 2022, for digital download. The soundtrack features material from Richter's solo discography.

Track listing

No.	Title	Length
1.	"Romance I"	1:57
2.	"Leo (MBF Version)" (from the reissue of the album Songs from Before, 2014)	2:11
3.	"Spring 1 (MBF Version)" (from the album Recomposed by Max Richter: Vivaldi – The Four Seasons, 2012)	2:32
4.	"Romance II"	1:40
5.	"This Picture Of Us. P." (from the album 24 Postcards in Full Colour, 2008)	1:38
6.	"Sub Piano (MBF Version)" (from the album Infra, 2010)	0:49
7.	"Fragment" (from the album Songs from Before, 2006)	1:44
8.	"Romance III"	1:55
9.	"Vladimir's Blues" (from the album The Blue Notebooks, 2004)	1:21
10.	"Romance IV"	1:39
11.	"Romance V"	1:41
12.	"moth-like stars (Edit)" (from the album Sleep, 2015)	10:40
Total length:		29:47

=== Season 4 ===
My Brilliant Friend, Season 4 (Original Soundtrack)

Soundtrack album by Max Richter
- Released: September 27, 2024
- Genre: Soundtrack
- Length: 39:07
- Label: Deutsche Grammophon

Max Richter chronology
In a Landscape (2024)	My Brilliant Friend, Season 4 (Original Soundtrack) (2024)	Heard on Tour (2024)

The soundtrack album for the fourth and final season was released by Deutsche Grammophon on September 27, 2024, for digital download. The soundtrack features material from Richter's solo discography.

Track listing

No.	Title	Length
1.	"Spring 1 (MBF Version)" (from the album Recomposed by Max Richter: Vivaldi – The Four Seasons, 2012)	2:31
2.	"Sub Piano" (from the album Infra, 2010)	0:49
3.	"An Earthquake"	5:12
4.	"In Remembrance of You" (from My Brilliant Friend (TV Series Soundtrack))	4:57
5.	"A Comic Grotesque"	3:58
6.	"Shadow 5" (from the album Recomposed by Max Richter: Vivaldi – The Four Seasons, 2012)	2:59
7.	"Summer 2" (from the album Recomposed by Max Richter: Vivaldi – The Four Seasons, 2012)	3:59
8.	"Organum" (from the album The Blue Notebooks, 2004)	3:13
9.	"Interior Dreams an Idea" (from the album Henry May Long, 2009)	2:17
10.	"Summer 1" (from the album Recomposed by Max Richter: Vivaldi – The Four Seasons, 2012)	4:11
11.	"A Folly"	3:12
12.	"Autumn 3" (from the album Recomposed by Max Richter: Vivaldi – The Four Seasons, 2012)	1:44
Total length:		39:07

== Reception ==
=== Critical response ===
On Rotten Tomatoes, the first season has a 93% rating with an average score of 8.4 out of 10 based on 57 reviews. The site's critical consensus is, "My Brilliant Friend is an expansive epic that gleans rapturous beauty from the most desolate of circumstances, but it is the intimacy between the central duo – and the remarkable performances that bring them to life – that audiences will remember most vividly". On Metacritic, it has a score of 87 out of 100 based on 20 reviews. Rhiannon Lucy Cosslett of The Guardian stated "How revolutionary it still feels to see female friendship explored onscreen in this way. It goes without saying that it takes the Bechdel test and turns it into ragù."

On Rotten Tomatoes, the second season has a 100% rating with an average score of 9.5 out of 10 based on 15 reviews. The site's critical consensus is, "Gorgeously shot and full of incredible performances, My Brilliant Friend's second season expands its small world with rich results." On Metacritic, it has a score of 92 out of 100 based on 8 reviews.

On Rotten Tomatoes, the third season has a 100% rating with an average score of 9.2 out of 10 based on 13 reviews. On Metacritic, it has a score of 96 out of 100 based on 6 reviews.

On Rotten Tomatoes, the fourth season has a 100% rating with an average score of 9 out of 10 based on 5 reviews.

=== Awards and nominations ===
Award	Year (Note: The listed year refers to the date of the ceremony, not necessarily the year in which the corresponding season or episode aired.)	Category	Nominee(s)	Result	Ref.
Ciak d'oro	2019	Serial Movie	My Brilliant Friend (Note: Nominee: Saverio Costanzo)	Won	
Critics' Choice Awards	2019	Best Drama Series	My Brilliant Friend	Nominated	
Critics' Choice Awards	2023	Best Foreign Language Series	My Brilliant Friend	Nominated	
Critics' Choice Awards	2025	Best Foreign Language Series	My Brilliant Friend	Nominated	
Diversity Media Awards	2019	Best Italian Series	My Brilliant Friend	Won (Note: Tied with SKAM Italia)	
Dorian Awards	2022	Best Non-English Language TV Show	My Brilliant Friend	Nominated	
Globo d'oro	2019	Best TV Series	My Brilliant Friend	Nominated	
Globo d'oro	2019	Best Breakthrough Actress	Ludovica Nasti	Won	
Globo d'oro	2020	Best TV Series	My Brilliant Friend	Nominated	
Gotham Awards	2019	Breakthrough Series – Long Form	My Brilliant Friend (Note: Nominees: Saverio Costanzo, Domenico Procacci, Lorenzo Mieli, Mario Gianani, Guido De Laurentiis, Elena Recchia, Jennifer Schuur, Paolo Sorrentino)	Nominated	
Il Luogo della Lingua Festival	2019	Placito Capuano Award	Saverio Costanzo	Won	
Monte-Carlo Television Festival	2019	Best Drama TV Series	My Brilliant Friend	Won	
Nastro d'Argento	2022	Best TV Series	My Brilliant Friend	Nominated	
Nastro d'Argento	2022	Best Supporting Actor	Eduardo Scarpetta	Won (Note: Tied with Max Tortora for Tutta colpa di Freud and Vita da Carlo)	
Nastro d'Argento	2025	Icon of the Year	Alba Rohrwacher	Won (Note: Shared with Luca Marinelli for Mussolini: Son of the Century, Kim Rossi Stuart for The Leopard, Monica Guerritore for Deceitful Love and Vittoria Schisano for The Life You Wanted)	
Nastro d'Argento	2025	Best TV Series – Drama	My Brilliant Friend	Nominated	
Nastro d'Argento	2025	Best Actress	Irene Maiorino	Nominated	
Nastro d'Argento	2025	Best Actor	Fabrizio Gifuni	Nominated	
Nastro d'Argento	2025	Best Supporting Actress	Anna Rita Vitolo	Nominated	
Peabody Awards	2019	Entertainment	HBO Entertainment in association with Rai Fiction, TIMvision and Wildside, Fandango and Umedia	Nominated	
Premi Flaiano	2019	Presidency Award	Elisa Del Genio, Ludovica Nasti	Won	
Premi Flaiano	2022	Best Director	Daniele Luchetti	Won	
Premio Biagio Agnes	2020	Fiction	My Brilliant Friend	Won	
Premios Ondas	2020	International Television	My Brilliant Friend	Won	
RdC Awards	2018	Navicella TV Award	My Brilliant Friend (Note: Nominees: Saverio Costanzo, Elisa Del Genio, Ludovica Nasti)	Won	
Serial Awards	2021	Scripted Series of the Year	My Brilliant Friend	Won	
Serial Awards	2021	Best Lead Actor	Gaia Girace, Margherita Mazzucco	Won	
Serial Awards	2021	Best Director	Alice Rohrwacher	Won	
Serial Awards	2021	Best Screenplay	Elena Ferrante, Francesco Piccolo, Laura Paolucci, Saverio Costanzo	Nominated	
Serial Awards	2021	Best Kiss	Gaia Girace, Francesco Serpico	Nominated	
Serial Awards	2021	Crossing Borders	Saverio Costanzo	Won	
Serial Awards	2022	Scripted Series of the Year	My Brilliant Friend	Nominated	
Serial Awards	2022	Best Lead Actor	Gaia Girace, Margherita Mazzucco	Won	
Serial Awards	2022	Best Director	Daniele Luchetti	Nominated	
Serial Awards	2022	Best Screenplay	Elena Ferrante, Francesco Piccolo, Laura Paolucci, Saverio Costanzo	Nominated	
Serial Awards	2022	Best Villain	Francesco Serpico	Won	
Serial Awards	2022	Look and Feel	My Brilliant Friend	Nominated	
Shanghai Television Festival	2019	Best Foreign TV Miniseries	My Brilliant Friend	Nominated	
Shanghai Television Festival	2020	Best Foreign TV Series	My Brilliant Friend	Won	
Sichuan Television Festival	2023	Best Television Series	My Brilliant Friend	Nominated	
Sichuan Television Festival	2023	Best Actress in a Leading Role for a Television Series	Margherita Mazzucco	Won	
Sichuan Television Festival	2023	Best Actress in a Supporting Role for a Television Series	Anna Rita Vitolo	Nominated	
Sichuan Television Festival	2023	Best Screenplay for a Television Series	Elena Ferrante, Francesco Piccolo, Laura Paolucci, Saverio Costanzo	Won	

== Home media ==
On April 2, 2019, HBO Home Entertainment released the first season on DVD and Digital in Region 1.
