= In a Landscape =

Studio album by Max Richter
- Released: 6 September 2024
- Studios: Studio Richter Mahr, Oxfordshire
- Length: 75:53
- Label: Decca
- Producer: Max Richter

Max Richter chronology
The New Four Seasons (2022)	In a Landscape (2024)

Singles from In a Landscape
- 1. "Movement, Before All Flowers" Released: 29 May 2024

In a Landscape is the ninth studio album by British composer Max Richter, released on 6 September 2024 by Decca Records. The record saw Richter returning to themes he previously explored on his 2004 album The Blue Notebooks. It was recorded in Studio Richter Mahr in Oxfordshire. The album was preceded by one single, "Movement, Before All Flowers". After the release of the album, Richter is set for his first-ever world tour.

== Release ==
In a Landscape was announced on 29 May 2024, with its release date set for 6 September by Decca Records. On the album, Richter said:

For me, the music on the record is about connecting or reconciling polarities. The electronics with the acoustic instruments, the natural world with the human world, and the big ideas of life with the personal and intimate. This is a dynamic I started to explore in my 2004 record The Blue Notebooks, and the new project shares many of that album's concerns; in a way this record is another look at the themes of the earlier work, but from the perspective of our world and our lives in 2024.

With the announcement, Richter also released the lead single, "Movement, Before All Flowers", which Clash's Robin Murray called "a beautiful introduction, embodying a unique sense of control. Every note is purposeful, marked by the kind of audio painting Max Richter has long since made his own."

== Recording ==
In a Landscape is Richter's first solo album recorded in Studio Richter Mahr, the studio in Oxfordshire which he built with his wife, Yulia Mahr.

== Reception ==
In a Landscape ratings
Aggregate scores
Source	Rating
AnyDecentMusic?	7.2/10
Metacritic	74/100
Review scores
Source	Rating
Clash	8/10
The Irish Times	4/5 stars
Pitchfork	7.3/10
Spectrum Culture	84%
Spin	B−

According to the review aggregator Metacritic, In a Landscape received "generally favorable reviews" based on a weighted average score of 74 out of 100 from 5 critic scores.

== Live ==
With the album, Richter also announced his first-ever world tour for September 2024 – May 2025 across Europe, Australia, and the United States, beginning with an appearance at La Bâtie-Festival de Genève in Geneva on 7 September. The Australia and United States legs of the tour will be performed with the American Contemporary Music Ensemble.

== Track listing ==
All tracks are written by Max Richter.

Disc 1 track listing
No.	Title	Length
1.	"They Will Shade Us with Their Wings"	8:33
2.	"Life Study I"	0:46
3.	"A Colour Field (Holocene)"	2:25
4.	"Life Study II"	1:24
5.	"And Some Will Fall"	8:04
6.	"Life Study III"	1:04
7.	"The Poetry of Earth (Geophony)"	3:58
8.	"Life Study IV"	0:31
9.	"Only Silent Words"	2:16
10.	"Life Study V"	0:30
11.	"Late and Soon"	7:10
12.	"Life Study VI"	0:41
13.	"Andante"	2:33
14.	"Life Study VII"	1:01
15.	"A Time Mirror (Biophony)"	3:58
16.	"Life Study VIII"	0:42
17.	"Love Song (After JE)"	5:39
18.	"Life Study IX"	0:52
19.	"Movement, Before All Flowers"	4:17

Disc 2 track listing
No.	Title	Length
1.	"And Some Will Fall" (edit)	4:11
2.	"The Poetry of Earth (Geophony)" (edit)	3:39
3.	"Late and Soon" (edit)	3:19
4.	"Love Song (After JE)" (edit)	4:41
5.	"Movement, Before All Flowers" (edit)	3:39
Total length:		75:53

== Personnel ==
=== Musicians ===
- Max Richter – synthesizer programming (tracks 1, 2, 4–7, 9, 11, 12, 15, 16, 18, 20–23), piano (1, 3, 7, 10, 13, 14, 17, 19, 22, 24, 25), Hammond organ (1, 15), rhythm programming (8), electronic percussion (17, 24)
- Max Ruisi and Zara Hudson-Kozdoj – cello (tracks 1, 5, 7, 11, 17, 19–25)
- Connie Pharoah and Eloisa-Fleur Thom – viola (tracks 1, 5, 7, 11, 17, 19–25)
- Max Baillie – violin (tracks 1, 5, 7, 11, 17, 19–25)
- Gemma Moore – baritone saxophone (tracks 1, 15)
- Martin Robertson and Paul Richadrs – bass clarinet (tracks 1, 15)
- David Fuest – clarinet (tracks 1, 15)
- Graeme Blevins and Martin Williams – tenor saxophone (tracks 1, 15)

=== Technical ===
- Max Richter – production (all tracks), engineering (tracks 2, 4, 6, 8, 10, 12, 14, 16, 18)
- Rupert Coulson – mixing (all tracks), engineering (tracks 1, 3, 5, 7, 8, 11, 13, 15, 17, 19–25)
- Alex Ferguson – engineering (tracks 1, 3, 5, 7, 11, 13, 15, 17, 19–25)
- Cicely Balston – mastering

== Charts ==
=== Weekly charts ===
Chart performance for In a Landscape
Chart (2024–2026)	Peak position
Belgian Albums (Ultratop Flanders)	28
Belgian Classical Albums (Ultratop 50 Flanders)	1
Belgian Classical Albums (Ultratop 50 Wallonia)	1
French Albums (SNEP)	175
French Classical Albums (SNEP)	1
German Albums (Offizielle Top 100)	63
Greek Albums (IFPI)	70
Scottish Albums (Official Charts)	12
Swiss Albums (Schweizer Hitparade)	30
UK Albums (Official Charts)	67
UK Classical Artist Albums (Official Charts)	1
UK Specialist Classical Albums (Official Charts)	1
US Top Classical Albums (Billboard)	2
US Top Classical Crossover Albums (Billboard)	4
US Traditional Classical Albums (Billboard)	11

=== Year-end charts ===
2025 year-end chart performance for In a Landscape
Chart (2025)	Peak position
Belgian Classical Albums (Ultratop 50 Flanders)	13
Belgian Classical Albums (Ultratop 50 Wallonia)	41
