= Memoryhouse (album) =

2002 studio album by Max Richter

Studio album by Max Richter
- Released: 27 May 2002
- Recorded: 1999–2001
- Genre: Contemporary classical; ambient; minimalist; post-minimalist
- Length: 65:04
- Label: Late Junction
- Producer: Max Richter; Jane Carter (exec. producer)

Max Richter chronology
Memoryhouse (2002)	The Blue Notebooks (2004)

Alternative cover
- 2009 reissue cover

Memoryhouse is the 2002 debut album by neo-classical composer Max Richter. Originally released under the Late Junction label, the album was reissued by FatCat Records in 2009 and 2014 with alternative album artwork.

== Critical reception ==
Professional ratings
Review scores
Source	Rating
AllMusic	4/5 stars
Pitchfork	8.7/10

Memoryhouse received largely positive reviews from contemporary music critics. Pitchfork Media gave the album a very positive review in a retrospective review for the 2014 reissue on FatCat.

== Track listing ==
All tracks are written by Max Richter

No.	Title	Length
1.	"Europe, after the Rain"	6:13
2.	"Maria, the Poet (1913)"	4:47
3.	"Laika's Journey"	1:30
4.	"The Twins (Prague)"	1:58
5.	"Sarajevo"	4:03
6.	"Andras"	2:42
7.	"Untitled (Figures)"	3:27
8.	"Sketchbook"	1:54
9.	"November"	6:21
10.	"Jan's Notebook"	2:41
11.	"Arbenita (11 Years)"	7:04
12.	"Garden (1973)/Interior"	3:24
13.	"Landscape with Figure (1922)"	5:14
14.	"Fragment"	1:26
15.	"Lines on a Page (One Hundred Violins)"	1:22
16.	"Embers"	3:38
17.	"Last Days"	4:18
18.	"Quartet Fragment (1908)"	3:02
Total length:		65:04

== Personnel ==
Main personnel

- Max Richter – composer, mixing, primary artist, producer
- BBC Philharmonic Orchestra – orchestra
- Levine Andrade – viola
- Alexander Bălănescu – soloist, violin
- Kirsteen Davidson Kelly – piano
- Judith Herbert – cello, soloist
- Sarah Leonard – soloist, soprano
- Rumon Gamba – conductor

Additional personnel

- John Cage – readings, text
- Jane Carter – executive producer
- Neil Hutchinson – engineer, mixing
- Mandy Parnell – remastering
- Ania Piesiewicz – photography
- Sarah Sutcliffe – readings
- Marina Tsvetaeva – text
