= On the Nature of Daylight =

2004 composition by Max Richter

Composition by Max Richter

from the album The Blue Notebooks
- Released: February 26, 2004
- Recorded: February 2003
- Studio: Eastcote, London; Hear No Evil, London
- Genre: Contemporary classical
- Length: 6:11
- Label: 130701
- Songwriter: Max Richter
- Producer: Max Richter

On the Nature of Daylight is a contemporary classical composition by German-born British composer Max Richter. Originally released in 2004 as part of his second solo album The Blue Notebooks, the piece has since become one of the most recognizable and influential works of the 21st century.

== History ==
The piece is written for a quintet of strings (two violins, two cellos, and one viola). It is characterized by its minimalist structure, hauntingly slow tempo, and a deep sense of melancholy and stoicism.

Recorded in February 2003, Richter composed the work as a protest against the 2003 invasion of Iraq, intending The Blue Notebooks to be an "anti-war" album that explored the fragility of truth and the persistence of beauty in a violent world. Richter has described the record as a quiet protest against the loud rhetoric of war.

=== Musical structure ===
The composition is built on a ground bass style, where a recurring bass line provides the foundation for evolving melodies.

- Harmony: the piece is in the key of B♭ minor. It utilizes a simple, cyclical chord progression.
- Layering: it begins with the lower strings (cellos and viola) playing in harmony. The violins eventually enter with an elegiac melody that climbs and dissolves creating a palindromic piece.
- Instrumentation: while originally written for five strings, Richter also released an "Orchestral Version" and various arrangements for full string orchestra to celebrate the album's 15th and 20th anniversaries.

== Reception ==
Erin Vanderhoof of Vanity Fair stated that Richter's work has become a "modern classic" and the non-traditional melody chord progression has led to the track becoming "one of the most recognizable tunes of the 21st century". Sarah Shachat of IndieWire noted that the track is "a shortcut to heartbreak" in film and is a devastating piece of music. However, some sources say that the track could be "diluted" through its extensive use in media.

== Cultural impact ==
"On the Nature of Daylight" is frequently cited as one of the most licensed pieces of modern classical music. The track's ability to evoke emotion had made it a favourite for filmmakers and has been notably used in Stranger Than Fiction (2006), Shutter Island (2010), Jiro Dreams of Sushi (2011), Disconnect (2012), Sherpa (2015), Arrival (2016), Togo (2019), Eastenders (2020), The Handmaid's Tale (2021), The Last of Us (2023) and Hamnet (2025). The track's inclusion in Arrival rendered the film ineligible for the Academy Award for Best Original Score, as the pre-existing music was deemed too central to the film's emotional impact.

== Certifications ==
Region	Certification	Certified units/sales
United Kingdom (BPI)	Silver	200,000^{‡}
^{‡} Sales+streaming figures based on certification alone.
