= Infra (album) =

Studio album by Max Richter
- Released: July 19, 2010
- Recorded: October 2009
- Studio: AIR Studios (London, England)
- Genre: Contemporary classical; Post-minimalist; Ambient
- Length: 40:35
- Label: FatCat

Max Richter chronology
24 Postcards in Full Colour (2008)	Infra (2010)	Recomposed by Max Richter: Vivaldi – The Four Seasons (2012)

Alternative cover
- 2014 reissue cover

Infra is a studio album by neo-classical composer Max Richter, released on July 19, 2010, on FatCat Records. The album was reissued on April 25, 2014, on Deutsche Grammophon.

== Album art ==
The album artwork is taken from the backdrop of The Royal Ballet's production Infra at the Royal Opera House in Covent Garden, London on November 11, 2008.

== Critical reception ==
Professional ratings
Aggregate scores
Source	Rating
Metacritic	77/100
Review scores
Source	Rating
AllMusic	4/5 stars
The A.V. Club	B−
Pitchfork	8.3/10

Infra received largely positive reviews from contemporary music critics. At Metacritic, which assigns a normalized rating out of 100 to reviews from mainstream critics, the album received an average score of 77, based on 14 reviews, which indicates "generally favorable reviews".

Joe Tangari of Pitchfork Media gave the album a positive review, stating, "Infra works as an enveloping and moving work even absent any knowledge of its beginnings. Others may glean different feelings from it than I do, but that is part of the point. Even if it conjures nothing of the night for you, it is some of Richter's very best work. And if you've ever cared about his music, it will make you feel something."

== Track listing ==
All tracks are written by Max Richter

No.	Title	Length
1.	"Infra 1"	4:04
2.	"Journey 1"	2:09
3.	"Infra 2"	4:27
4.	"Infra 3"	3:01
5.	"Journey 2"	2:13
6.	"Infra 4"	2:45
7.	"Journey 3"	2:50
8.	"Journey 4"	4:39
9.	"Journey 5"	1:13
10.	"Infra 5"	5:16
11.	"Infra 6"	2:52
12.	"Infra 7"	1:45
13.	"Infra 8"	3:21
Total length:		40:35

Deutsche Grammophon reissue bonus track
No.	Title	Length
14.	"Sub Piano"	0:49
Total length:		41:24

== Personnel ==
Main personnel

- Max Richter – composer, electronics, mixing, piano, primary artist
- Nick Barr – viola
- Natalia Bonner – violin
- Ian Burdge – cello
- Chris Worsey – cello
- Louisa Fuller – violin

Additional personnel

- Bill Cooper – photography
- Julian Opie – images
- Mandy Parnell – mastering
- Nick Wollage – engineer

== Release history ==
Country	Date
United Kingdom	July 19, 2010
United States	July 20, 2010
