= Max Richter =

German composer (born 1966)

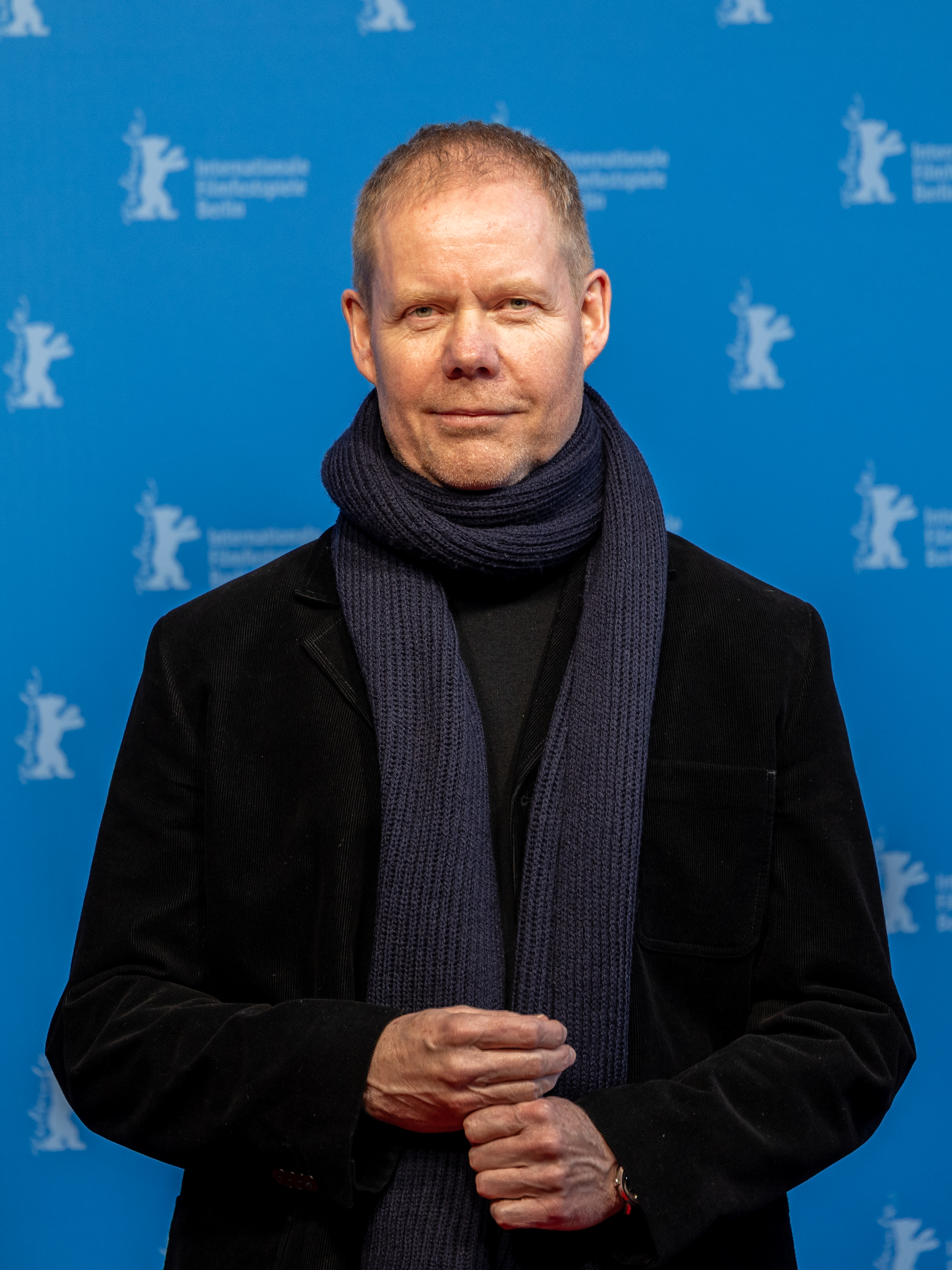
- Richter in 2026

Background information
- Born: 22 March 1966 (age 60); Hamelin, Lower Saxony, West Germany
- Origin: Hamelin, Germany
- Education: University of Edinburgh; Royal Academy of Music
- Genres: Contemporary classical; ambient; minimalism; post-minimalism
- Occupations: Composer; pianist; producer
- Instruments: Piano; organ; synthesizer
- Years active: 1994–present
- Labels: Studio Richter-Mahr; Deutsche Grammophon; 130701; FatCat; Universal; Universal Classics and Jazz; Late Junction; Mute; Delabel; Milan; CAM; Colosseum; JADE; Fontana; Silva Screen; 7hings
- Website: maxrichtermusic.com

Max Richter (/ˈrɪxtər/; German: [ˈʁɪçtɐ]; born 22 March 1966) is a German-born British composer and pianist. He works within postminimalist and contemporary classical styles. Richter is classically trained, having graduated in composition from the University of Edinburgh, the Royal Academy of Music in London, and studied with Luciano Berio in Italy.

Richter arranges, performs, and composes music for stage, opera, ballet, and screen. He has collaborated with other musicians, as well as with performance, installation, and media artists. He has recorded eight solo albums, and his music is widely used in cinema. As of December 2019, Richter has passed one billion streams and one million album sales.

Richter has been called a "major figure of contemporary music" and his work has been described as "transcending genres" by the former controller of BBC Radio 3, Alan Davey. His 2004 album, The Blue Notebooks, has been called "one of the best classical works of the century". In 2026, he was nominated for an Academy Award for his work on the soundtrack of Hamnet.

== Early life and career ==
Richter was born in Hamelin, Lower Saxony, West Germany. He grew up in Bedford, England, United Kingdom, and his education was at Bedford Modern School and Mander College of Further Education.

He had piano lessons and music classes, and at 12 or 13, heard a BBC documentary using the opening to Kraftwerk's Autobahn, which later became the first record he bought. It inspired him to research how to build synthesizers, and led on to listening to artists like Tangerine Dream, Klaus Schulze and Vangelis. At around the same time, the local milkman introduced him to minimalist music by the likes of Terry Riley, Philip Glass and John Cage.

Richter studied composition and piano at the University of Edinburgh and at the Royal Academy of Music, though he had some reservations about the syllabus being focused on a Polish School modernist canon to the detriment of other minimalist works. This led him to study with Luciano Berio in Florence which struck him as "opening a door" to "music which was more various".

Richter became involved in performing minimal and post-minimal music, and co-founded the contemporary classical ensemble Piano Circus. He stayed with the group for ten years, commissioning and performing works by minimalist musicians such as Arvo Pärt, Brian Eno, Philip Glass, Julia Wolfe, and Steve Reich. The ensemble was signed to Decca/Argo, producing five albums.

In 1996, Richter collaborated with Future Sound of London on the album Dead Cities, first as a pianist, but ultimately working on several tracks and co-writing the track "Max". He worked with the band for two years, also contributing to the albums The Isness and The Peppermint Tree and Seeds of Superconsciousness. In 2000, Richter worked with Mercury Prize winner Roni Size on the Reprazent album In the Mode. Additionally, he produced Vashti Bunyan's 2005 album Lookaftering and Kelli Ali's 2008 album Rocking Horse.

Richter released his first solo album in 2002, Memoryhouse, to critical praise, and has produced another eight studio albums since. In 2015, he released Sleep, which has been described as the “most streamed classical record of all time".

Alongside his solo work, he has worked on film and television scores, producing over fifty. In 2022, Richter and his partner Yulia Mahr founded Studio Richter Mahr, a studio and recording space that supports young artists.

== Solo work ==
Richter's solo albums include:

=== Memoryhouse (2002) ===
During a trip to Lantau island in 1994, Richter saw a gate to an old Zen monastery bearing the inscription "Time does not exist. What is memory?", sparking his interest in memory. Reviewed by Andy Gill as "a landmark work of contemporary classical music", Richter's solo debut, Memoryhouse, an experimental album of "documentary music" recorded with the BBC Philharmonic Orchestra, explores real and imaginary stories and histories. Several of the tracks, such as "Sarajevo", "November", "Arbenita", and "Last Days", deal with the aftermath of the Kosovo conflict, while others are of childhood memories (e.g. "Laika's Journey"). The music combines ambient sounds, voices (including that of John Cage), and poetry readings from the work of Marina Tsvetaeva. BBC Music called the album "a masterpiece in neoclassical composition". Memoryhouse was first played live by Richter at the Barbican Centre on 24 January 2014 to coincide with a vinyl re-release of the album.

Pitchfork gave the re-release an 8.7 rating, commenting on its extensive influence:

In 2002, Richter's ability to weave subtle electronics against the grand BBC Philharmonic Orchestra helped suggest new possibilities and locate fresh audiences that composers such as Nico Muhly and Michał Jacaszek have since pursued. As you listen to new work by Julianna Barwick or Jóhann Jóhannsson, thank Richter; just as Sigur Rós did with its widescreen rock, Richter showed that crossover wasn't necessarily an artistic curse.

=== The Blue Notebooks (2004) ===
Named by The Guardian in 2019 as one of the best classical works of the century, The Blue Notebooks, released in 2004, featured the actress Tilda Swinton reading from Kafka's The Blue Octavo Notebooks and the work of Czesław Miłosz. Upon release, Pitchfork described the album as "Not only one of the finest record of the last six months, but one of the most affecting and universal contemporary classical records in recent memory."

Richter has said that The Blue Notebooks is a protest album about the Iraq War, as well as a meditation on his own troubled childhood. This album is "more interior in nature" to the previous Memoryhouse, but certain themes are present in both, with the main theme of Memoryhouse played by a cello in "Europe after the Rain", present in "On the Nature of Daylight", this time played by a violin.

The second track, "On the Nature of Daylight", is used in both the opening and closing sequences of the sci-fi film Arrival and on the soundtracks of Martin Scorsese's Shutter Island, Henry-Alex Rubin's Disconnect and Chloé Zhao's Hamnet. It is also used in episode 3, "Long, Long Time", of the HBO series The Last of Us.

To mark the 10th anniversary of its release, Richter created a track-by-track commentary for Drowned in Sound, in which he described the album as a series of interconnected dreams and an exploration of the chasm between lived experience and imagination.

On the eve of its 2018 reissue, marking the 15th anniversary of its release, Fact named the album "one of the most iconic pieces of classical and protest music of the 21st century." The re-release included a new cover design and several new tracks that were originally composed for the project. Richter also released another single, "Cypher", an 8-minute classical-electronic track based upon the theme of "On the Nature of Daylight".

=== Songs from Before (2006) ===
In 2006, Richter released his third solo album, Songs from Before, which features Robert Wyatt reading texts by Haruki Murakami in between strings, electronic sounds and "dream struck piano". It expanded on the minimalist soundscapes of his earlier work. Writing in The Guardian, critic John L Waters awarded it four stars, and described it as "rewarding repeated listening" with its strong melodies complementing its atmospherics. Pitchfork described is as "his most cohesive album to date", commenting on his use of rubato conjuring "an overwhelming emotional tizzy, bouts of rhythmic unpredictably guiding the familiar patterns of Richter's beloved minor triads".

=== 24 Postcards in Full Colour (2008) ===
Richter released his fourth solo album 24 Postcards in Full Colour, a collection of 24 classically composed miniatures for ringtones, in 2008. The pieces are a series of variations on the basic material, scored for strings, piano, and electronics.

Discussing the album with NPR Classical in 2017, Richter said: "People were downloading ringtones at the time and I felt this was a missed opportunity for composers—that there was a space opening up, maybe a billion little loudspeakers walking around the planet, but nobody was really thinking of this as a space for creative music. So I set out to make these tiny little fragments and then, of course, in the poetic sense, the idea of these little sounds carrying objects traversing the planet—I started to think of these as a connection, as a sort of postcard into somebody's life, into their space."

=== Infra (2010) ===
Richter's 2010 album Infra takes as its central theme the 2005 terrorist bombings in London, and is an extension of his 25-minute score for a ballet of the same name choreographed by Wayne McGregor and staged at the Royal Opera House. Richter expanded his score to create a cycle, taking inspiration from Franz Schubert's Winterreisse, T.S Eliot's "The Wasteland" and the works of Wilhelm Müller.

Infra comprises music written for piano, electronics, and string quintet, plus the full performance score and material that developed from the construction of the album. The work consists of eight movements of varying instrumentation. On the theme, Richter described music as a "catalyzer of a thought; a reflection and I hope people will come to that music in that way."

Pitchfork called the album "achingly gorgeous" and The Independent characterised it as "a journey in 13 episodes, emerging from a blur of static and finding its way in a repeated phrase that grows in loveliness".

=== Recomposed by Max Richter: Vivaldi – The Four Seasons (2012) ===
Richter's 'recomposed' version of Vivaldi's The Four Seasons, Recomposed by Max Richter: Vivaldi – The Four Seasons, was premiered in the UK at the Barbican Centre on 31 October 2012 by the Britten Sinfonia, conducted by André de Ridder with violinist Daniel Hope. The work is an example of "musical borrowing" as coined by musicologist J. Peter Burkholder, taking something new from an existing piece of music and using it in a new piece. It was put on the syllabus of the French baccalaureate exams in 2019 and 2020, with an accompanying monograph, with the foreword by the national schools inspector stating that musical education "cannot restrict itself to the past".

Richter said he had discarded 75% of Vivaldi's original material, but the parts he kept are phased and looped, emphasising his grounding in postmodern and minimalist music, and leading one critic to quip parenthetically, "(Perhaps you could call Richter a baroque decomposer?)." The album topped the iTunes classical chart in the UK, Germany, and the US. The US launch concert in New York at Le Poisson Rouge was recorded by NPR and streamed.

Over the four seasons, Richter uses various techniques such as adjusting the tempo, changing the rhythm to something less "regimented" than Vivaldi's original, instructing particular dynamics, and changing instrumentation, such as a viola swapped to a cello in Spring 2. Richter has also referred to the musical breaks in the work as "jump cuts", a cinematic term, used in this instance to describe the breaks creating "leaps" or the sense of a "trap-door opening".

=== Sleep and From Sleep (2015) ===
In 2015, Richter released his most ambitious project to date, a collaboration with visual artist and creative partner Yulia Mahr titled Sleep, an 8.5-hour listening experience targeted to fit a full night's rest. The album contains 31 compositions, most of them 20–30 minutes in duration, all based on variations of 4-5 themes. The music is calm, slow, and mellow, and composed for piano, cello, two violas, two violins, organ, soprano vocals, synthesisers, and electronics. Strings are played by the American Contemporary Music Ensemble (Ben Russell, Yuki Numata Resnik, Caleb Burhans, Clarice Jensen, and Brian Snow), vocals are by Grace Davidson, and the piano, synthesisers, and electronics are played by Richter.

Richter also released a one-hour version of the project, From Sleep, that contains roughly one shortened version of every "theme" from Sleep (hence its title) and is supposed to act as a shorter listening experience for the Sleep project.

Richter has called Sleep an eight-hour-long lullaby. The work was strongly influenced by Gustav Mahler's symphonic works.

The entire composition was performed from midnight to 8 A.M. on 27 September 2015 as the climax of the "Science and Music" weekend on BBC Radio 3. The performance broke several records, including the longest live broadcast of a single musical composition in the network's history.

Jarvis Cocker chose Sleep as the BBC Radio 6 album of the year for 2015. Pitchfork named it one of the 50 best ambient albums of all time.

Richter has performed the full-length Sleep live at the Concertgebouw (Grote Zaal) Amsterdam; the Sydney Opera House; in Berlin (as part of Berliner Festspiele's Maerz Musik Festival); in Madrid (as part of Veranos de la Villa); and in London (at the Barbican). In November 2017, Sleep was played at the Philharmonie de Paris.

Sleep was performed for its first outdoor performance and largest performance to date in Los Angeles on 27–28 July and 28–29 July 2018. The performances took place in Grand Park, opposite Los Angeles Music Center. Each performance had 560 beds and was timed so the final movement, "Dream 0 (till break of day)", would occur at dawn. Richter played with members of the American Contemporary Music Ensemble.

In September 2018, Sleep was played in the Antwerp cathedral for an audience of 400, who were given beds for the night. In August 2019, it was performed in Helsinki, as part of the Helsinki Festival, in the tent arena, with half the audience in two-person tents.

In March 2025, a full-length performance took place in the Vienna Arsenal, in the Malersaal, a location normally used as a painter's workshop for opera and stage production decor and backdrops.

"I think of it as a piece of protest music," Richter has said. "It's protest music against this sort of very super-industrialised, intense, mechanised way of living right now. It's a political work in that sense. It's a call to arms to stop what we're doing.

=== Three Worlds: Music from Woolf Works (2017) ===
Three Worlds: Music From Woolf Works is Richter's eighth album, released in January 2017. The music is taken from his score for the ballet Woolf Works, choreographed by Wayne McGregor at the Royal Opera House in London, which follows a three-part structure offering evocations of three books by Virginia Woolf: Mrs Dalloway, Orlando, and The Waves. The album features classical and electronic sound as well as a voice recording of Woolf herself.

=== Voices (2020) ===
Richter's Voices project, a collaboration with visual artist Yulia Mahr, is inspired by the Universal Declaration of Human Rights and features an 'upside down' orchestra, a concept he developed to reflect his dismay about post-truth politics in the 21st century. The album contains readings of the declaration by Eleanor Roosevelt and actress KiKi Layne, with another 70 readings crowd-sourced from around the world.

Mahr's accompanying videos deal with the artist's own experiences of migration. The video 'Mercy' won a BAFTA award.

Yo-Yo Ma played the album's opening piece at his concert "A New Equilibrium" honouring the 75th anniversary of the UN's creation.

=== Voices 2 (2021) ===
A follow up to Voices (2020), described as "a more restful, almost ambient affair" compared to the previous album, and reflecting "Richter's dismay with post-truth politics".

=== Exiles (2021) ===
On 6 August 2021, the album Exiles was released. It was recorded in 2019, in Tallinn, Estonia, with the collaboration of conductor Kristjan Järvi and the Baltic Sea Philharmonic. Exiles includes extended versions of previously released works such as "The Haunted Ocean", "Infra 5", "Flowers Of Herself", "On The Nature Of Daylight" and "Sunlight". Richter has called the album a serious work because of its subject, which has an emotional texture.

=== In a Landscape (2024) ===
In A Landscape, Richter's ninth studio album, was released on September 6, 2024, via Decca Records. The album employs a musical language reminiscent of his seminal work The Blue Notebooks, with the two records serving as bookends to a defining chapter in his life and career. Conceived as an open dialogue with the listener, In A Landscape invites reflection on personal dualities and the stories that surface through sound, ultimately extending an invitation to imagination. In conjunction with the release, Richter embarked on his first world tour.

=== Sleep Circle (2025) ===
In September 2025, to mark the tenth anniversary of his landmark work Sleep, Max Richter released Sleep Circle, a "hallucinatory 90-minute journey into the hypnagogic state", the threshold "between wakefulness and sleep" where dreaming begins. Inspired by performing an abridged version of Sleep live in 2023, Richter revisited the material with a renewed sense of structure and formality, recording the new work at Studio Richter Mahr. The 90-minute duration reflects the length of a typical REM cycle, underscoring Richter's ongoing exploration of the relationship between music, consciousness, and the human experience of rest. Richter consulted neuroscientist David Eagleman to better understand the brain entering and during sleep.

== Film and television work ==
Richter has written many film and television soundtracks over the years. He rose to prominence with his score to Ari Folman's Golden Globe-winning film Waltz with Bashir in 2007, which uses synth-based sounds and won him the European Film Award for Best Composer. He also scored the independent feature film Henry May Long, starring Randy Sharp and Brian Barnhart, in 2008, and wrote the music for Feo Aladag's film Die Fremde (with additional music by Stéphane Moucha).

In 2010, Dinah Washington's "This Bitter Earth" was remixed with Richter's "On the Nature of Daylight" for the Martin Scorsese film Shutter Island. In July 2010, "On the Nature of Daylight" and "Vladimir's Blues" were featured throughout the BBC Two two-part drama Dive, co-written by Dominic Savage and Simon Stevens. "On the Nature of Daylight" was also featured in an episode of HBO's television series Luck. Four tracks—"Europe, After the Rain", "The Twins (Prague)", "Fragment", and "Embers"—were used in the six-part 2005 BBC documentary Auschwitz: The Nazis and the Final Solution. Richter also wrote the soundtrack to Peter Richardson's documentary How to Die in Oregon and the score to Impardonnables, directed by André Téchiné.

An excerpt of the song "Sarajevo" from Memoryhouse was used in the international trailer for Ridley Scott's film Prometheus. The track "November", from the same album, was featured in the international trailer for Terrence Malick's 2012 film To the Wonder and in the trailer for Clint Eastwood's 2011 film J. Edgar. Films featuring Richter's music released in 2011 include French drama Sarah's Key by Gilles Paquet-Brenner and David MacKenzie's romantic thriller Perfect Sense. In 2012 he composed the scores for Henry Alex Rubin's Disconnect and Cate Shortland's Australian-German war thriller Lore. Richter again collaborated with Folman on The Congress, released in 2013.

Richter composed the original soundtrack for the HBO series The Leftovers, created by Damon Lindelof and Tom Perrotta, which premiered in June 2014. Some of these compositions are included in the albums Memoryhouse and The Blue Notebooks. He also composed the score for the feature film Testament of Youth in 2014.

In 2016, Richter composed the score to "Nosedive", an episode of Black Mirror. Also that year, he scored Luke Scott's debut feature Morgan and the political thriller Miss Sloane. "On the Nature of Daylight" opened and closed Denis Villeneuve's film Arrival. Similarly it closed episode 7 of Castle Rock, "The Queen", and has featured in The Handmaid's Tale and HBO's The Last of Us in 2021 and 2023 respectively.

He composed all the music in BBC One's drama Taboo, broadcast in January and February 2017.

In 2017, The Current War used Richter's "Spring 1" and documentary filmmaker Nancy Buirski used the track combining Dinah Washington's "This Bitter Earth" with Richter's "On The Nature of Daylight", first heard in Shutter Island, in her film Recy Taylor. In December 2017 an excerpt of Recomposed by Max Richter: Vivaldi – The Four Seasons was used in The Crown as the theme for Princess Margaret's (Vanessa Kirby) turbulent courtship with photographer Anthony Armstrong-Jones (Matthew Goode).

In 2018, Richter composed music for the films Hostiles, White Boy Rick, Never Look Away, and Mary Queen of Scots. He also composed music for the HBO series My Brilliant Friend. In 2019, Richter scored the film Ad Astra, with additional music by Nils Frahm and Lorne Balfe. An excerpt of his rendition of Dona nobis pacem was used for the fifth season of the BBC series Peaky Blinders.

Richter composed the score for the Apple TV series Invasion.

In 2025, Richter composed music for the film Hamnet. "On the Nature of Daylight" played "behind the searingly emotional finale". For his work on the film, he received his first Academy Award Nomination at the 98th Academy Awards.

== Ballet, opera, and stage works ==
Richter wrote the score to Infra as part of a Royal Ballet-commissioned collaboration with choreographer Wayne McGregor and artist Julian Opie. The production was staged at the Royal Opera House in London in 2008. In 2011, Richter composed a chamber opera based on neuroscientist David Eagleman's book Sum: Forty Tales from the Afterlives. The opera was choreographed by Wayne McGregor and premiered at the Royal Opera House Linbury Studio Theatre in 2012. The piece received positive reviews, with London's Evening Standard saying "[it] fits together rather beautifully". Their collaboration continued in April 2014 with Wayne McGregor's 'Kairos'; a ballet set to Richter's recomposition of the Four Seasons and part of a collaborative program involving three different choreographers titled 'Notations' with Ballett Zürich. In 2015 Richter and McGregor collaborated again on a new full-length ballet, Woolf Works, inspired by three novels by Virginia Woolf.

Crystal Pite has also choreographed a ballet to Richter's Vivaldi Recomposed, titled The Seasons' Canon, which premiered at the Opéra National de Paris in 2016. Sol Leon and Paul Lightfoot choreographed a piece to Richter's "Exiles" for the Nederlands Dans Theater.

In 2012/13, Richter contributed music to The National Theatre of Scotland's production of Macbeth, starring Alan Cumming. The play opened at New York's Lincoln Centre and subsequently moved to Broadway. The company had previously used Richter's "Last Days" in their acclaimed production of Black Watch.

Richter worked on a project based on Samuel Barber's Adagio for Strings and Antonio Vivaldi's The Four Seasons and made a ballet with artist Idris Khan.

Richter was called upon again by past collaborator Wayne McGregor to score and produce an adaptation of Margaret Atwood's MaddAddam trilogy commissioned by the National Ballet of Canada and The Royal Ballet in 2022, wherein his orchestral and electronically produced compositions, both alone and together, help to realize Atwood's dystopian vision.

== Other collaborations and work ==
In 2010, Richter's soundscape The Anthropocene formed part of Darren Almond's film installation at the White Cube gallery in London. The composer has also collaborated with digital art collective Random International on two projects, contributing scores to the installations Future Self (2012), staged at the MADE space in Berlin, and Rain Room (2012/13) at London's Barbican Centre and MOMA, in New York.

Working with Christian Astuguevieille and Guillaume Flavigny of Commes des Garcons Parfums he worked to produce a fragrance incorporating scents such as graphite and piano cedar, with partner Yulia Mahr providing an accompanying artwork. Richter has also composed scores for Dior fashion shows, working with Kim Jones on the Dior Mens Autumn/Winter 2024–25 in Paris and Jones' debut in 2021.

In 2023, Richter, an admirer of Derek Jarman's work, provided original music to accompany Jarman's "Modern Nature". A tribute to the artist combining his footage with readings and music. Described as a "joint work of Jarman and Richter" that "appears as a work that is constantly updated and reinvented" due to its lack of fixed synchronisation in performance. The same year, he composed the "Seedling" and "Unfold" ringtones for iOS 17.

In 2025, photographer Trent Parke was inspired by Richter's "Hostiles" soundtrack and used the track "Never Goodbye" to determine the sequence of photographs in a book. For his exhibition Monument, he obtained permission to use the same music as part of it, commenting that "music brings in another dimension which can enrich the emotional journey.".

=== Studio Richter Mahr ===
In 2022 Richter and his partner, visual artist Yulia Mahr, founded Studio Richter Mahr or "SRM". They had been looking for a location for five years and had "stumbled across" a "disused alpaca farm" in rural Oxfordshire. The Studio's purpose is to support young artists with Mahr saying "We understand what it's like to be a young artist; there's no real support. It took a really long time to earn any money, to make ends meet," and that artists "need doors opened for them".

Partly inspired by "creative communities" such as Black Mountain College, the Bauhaus and Kala Bhavana., the former farmhouse has been renovated to "rural minimalism" with solar panels and a heat pump, to a carbon negative standard.

Mahr has said it was about "dreaming the future into existence, a better way to live and work". Facilities include an orchestral recording room, a Dolby Atmos mixing room, art studios, exhibition spaces and a rare Steinway Spirio R concert grand piano. It has commissioned works for composers such as Cassie Kinoshi, has a residency programme and offers free studio space. Residents have included Afrodeutsche, Nadia Beard, Chi-Chi Nwanoku, Zara Hudson-Kozdoj and Mendez.

== Musical style ==
Richter's work has come in the forms of solo albums, ballets, concert hall performances, film and television series, video art installations and theatre works. His music has been described as "transcending genres" by the former controller of BBC Radio 3, Alan Davey, but also "genre defining".

His work could be described as minimalist or postminimalist in style, "matching the definition" of composer Tom Johnson when describing the work of Philip Glass, La Monte Young and Steve Reich in 1972. Richter works with a "limited rhythmic and harmonic palette" but builds soundscapes through an "expressive treatment of timbre".

Musicologists have described his work having intertextual qualities, "evoking other styles without making the source explicit". Compositions on Memoryhouse reference Late Romanticism such as Mahler and Messiaen, some Sacred Minimalism in Gorecki, the Baroque with Bach, and also Drum and bass and Electronica.

== Personal life ==
Richter met visual artist Yulia Mahr at the Edinburgh Festival in 1988. They began living together, in Islington, London, in 1993 and have three children, born in 1998, 1999, and 2008. They married in 2003. The couple live in Oxfordshire with their children, two black Labradors called Haku (named after the dragon in Studio Ghibli's animated film Spirited Away) and Evie, and a cat called Kiki (named after the titular character in Kiki's Delivery Service). The couple have previously lived in Edinburgh and Berlin.

== Discography ==
=== Studio albums ===
Title	Album details
Memoryhouse	Released: 2002; Labels: Late Junction, 130701, FatCat Records; Formats: 2×LP, CD, digital
The Blue Notebooks	Released: 2004, 2018 (re-release); Labels: 130701, Deutsche Grammophon; Formats: LP, CD, digital
Songs from Before	Released: 2006; Labels: 130701, Deutsche Grammophon; Formats: LP, CD, digital
24 Postcards in Full Colour	Released: 2008; Labels: 130701; Formats: LP, CD
From "The Art of Mirrors"	Released: 2009; Labels: 7hings (Seven Things); Formats: digital
Infra	Released: 2010; Labels: 130701, FatCat Records, p*dis, Deutsche Grammophon; Formats: LP, CD, digital
Recomposed by Max Richter: Vivaldi – The Four Seasons	Released: 2012; Labels: Deutsche Grammophon; Formats: LP, CD, digital
Sleep	Released: 2015; Labels: Deutsche Grammophon; Formats: 2×LP, CD, digital
Three Worlds: Music from Woolf Works	Released: 2017; Labels: Deutsche Grammophon; Formats: 2×LP, CD, digital
Beethoven Opus 2020	Released: 2020; Labels: Deutsche Grammophon; Formats: digital EP
Voices	Released: 2020; Labels: Decca Records; Formats: 2×LP, 2×CD, digital
Voices 2	Released: 2021; Labels: Decca Records; Formats: LP, CD, digital
Exiles	Released: 2021; Labels: Deutsche Grammophon; Formats: 2×LP, CD, digital; with Baltic Sea Philharmonic and Kristjan Järvi
The New Four Seasons	Released: 2022; Labels: Deutsche Grammophon; Formats: 2×LP, CD, digital; with Chineke! Orchestra and Elena Urioste
In a Landscape	Released: 6 September 2024; Label: Decca Records
While the Flood Rages	Released: 16 October 2026; Label: Deutsche Grammophon; with Tenebrae Choir

=== Scores ===
Title	Year	Director	Notes
Gender Trouble	2003	Roz Mortimer	Short film
The Rope	2005	Philippe André	Short film
Geheime Geschichten	2003	Christine Wiegand	Film
Soundproof	2006	Edmund Coulthard	Film
Work	2006	Jim Hosking	Film
Butterfly	2007	Tracey Gardiner	Short film
Hope	2007	Stanislaw Mucha	Film
Frankie Howerd: Rather You Than Me	2008	John Alexander	Film
Henry May Long	2008	Randy Sharp	Film. Soundtrack album released in 2009 (digital) and in 2017 (CD and vinyl).
Waltz with Bashir (Vals im Bashir)	2008	Ari Folman	Film
Lost and Found	2008	Philip Hunt	Film
Penelope (Penelopa)	2009	Ben Ferris	
La vie sauvage des animaux domestiques (Die wilde Farm)	2009	Dominique Garing & Frédéric Goupil	
The Front Line (La prima linea)	2009	Renato De Maria	
My Words, My Lies – My Love (Lila, Lila)	2009	Alain Gsponer	
When We Leave (Die Fremde)	2010	Feo Aladağ	With Stéphane Moucha.
My Trip to Al-Qaeda	2010	Alex Gibney	
Womb	2010	Benedek Fliegauf	
Sarah's Key (Elle s'appelait Sarah)	2010	Gilles Paquet-Brenner	
The Gift	2010	Andrew Griffin	With Hildur Guðnadóttir and Keith Kenniff (Goldmund)
How to Die in Oregon	2010	Peter D. Richardson	
Perfect Sense	2011	David Mackenzie	
Unforgivable	2011	André Téchiné	
Nach der Stille	2011	Stephanie Bürger, Jule Ott & Manal Abdallah	With Sven Kaiser
Citizen Gangster	2011	Nathan Morlando	
Jiro Dreams of Sushi	2011	David Gelb	With Jiro Ono
The Patience Stone/Syngue Sabour	2012	Atiq Rahimi	
Spanien	2012	Anja Salomonowitz	
Lore	2012	Cate Shortland	
Wadjda	2012	Haifaa Al-Mansour	
Disconnect	2012	Henry-Alex Rubin	
The Nun	2013	Guillaume Nicloux	
The Congress	2013	Ari Folman	
The Lunchbox	2013	Ritesh Batra	
The Last Days on Mars	2013	Ruairí Robinson	
The Mark of the Angels – Miserere	2013	Sylvain White	
Prison Terminal: The Last Days of Private Jack Hall	2013	Edgar Barens	
The Green Prince	2014	Nadav Schirman	
96 hours	2014	Frédéric Schoendoerffer	
Escobar: Paradise Lost	2014	Andrea Di Stefano	
Testament of Youth	2014	James Kent	
The Leftovers	2014–2017	Damon Lindelof, Tom Perrotta (ex. producers)	TV series. Soundtrack albums released on 2 December 2014 (season 1), 19 February 2015 (season 2), and 2 June 2017 (season 3, EP).
Into the Forest	2015	Patricia Rozema	
Morgan	2016	Luke Scott	
Black Mirror	2016	Joe Wright	TV episode ("Nosedive"). Soundtrack album released on 21 October 2016.
Arrival	2016	Denis Villeneuve	Film. "On the Nature of Daylight" used as a theme. Score by Jóhann Jóhannsson.
Miss Sloane	2016	John Madden	
Taboo	2017	Kristoffer Nyholm, Anders Engström	TV series. Soundtrack album released on 15 September 2017.
Return to Montauk	2017	Volker Schlöndorff	
The Sense of an Ending	2017	Ritesh Batra	
Guerrilla	2017	John Ridley, Sam Miller	TV series.
Hostiles	2017	Scott Cooper	
White Boy Rick	2018	Yann Demange	
Never Look Away	2018	Florian Henckel von Donnersmarck	Film. Soundtrack album released on 5 October 2018.
Mary Queen of Scots	2018	Josie Rourke	Film. Soundtrack album released on 7 December 2018.
My Brilliant Friend	2018–2024	Saverio Costanzo	TV series. Soundtrack albums released on 7 December 2018 (season 1) and 1 May 2020 (season 2).
Ad Astra	2019	James Gray	
Invasion	2021–present	Simon Kinberg, David Weil (creators)	TV series.
Spaceman	2024	Johan Renck	
Hamnet	2025	Chloé Zhao	also producer, orchestrator and pianist

== Awards and nominations ==
Year	Award	Category	Film	Result	Ref.
2008	Long Island International Film Expo	Triple Play Award for Best Technical Integration	Henry May Long (shared with Ben Wolf and Eric Friedewald)	Won	
2008	Park City Film Music Festival	Silver Medal for Excellence	Henry May Long (shared with Paul Carbonara, Annette Kudrak and Randy Sharp)	Won	
2008	ReelHeART International Film Festival	Best Sound	Henry May Long (shared with Annette Kudrak)	Won	
2008	European Film Award	Best Composer	Waltz with Bashir	Won	
2008	International Film Music Critics Award	Best Original Score for an Animated Feature Film	Waltz with Bashir	Nominated	
2008	International Film Music Critics Award	Breakthrough Film Composer of the Year	Waltz with Bashir	Nominated	
2009	Annie Awards	Best Music in an Animated Feature Production	Waltz with Bashir	Nominated	
2009	Cinema Eye Honors	Outstanding Achievement in Music Composition	Waltz with Bashir	Won	
2010	German Critics Association Awards	Best Music	Die Fremde	Won	
2012	Stockholm International Film Festival	Best Music Score	Lore	Won	
2013	Australian Film Critics Association Awards	Best Music Score	Lore	Nominated	
2013	Bavarian Film Awards	Best Music	Lore	Won	
2013	Film Critics Circle of Australia Awards	Best Music Score	Lore	Nominated	
2013	German Film Awards	Best Film Score	Lore	Nominated	
2014	Hollywood Music in Media Awards	Best Main Title – TV Show/Digital Streaming Series	The Leftovers	Won	
2014	International Film Music Critics Award	Best Original Score for a Television Series	The Leftovers	Nominated	
2015	Grammy Awards	Best Music Video	The Golden Age – Woodkid featuring Max Richter	Nominated	
2016	Evening Standard British Film Awards	Technical Achievement	Arrival	Won	
2017	Primetime Emmy Awards	Outstanding Music Composition for a Series (Original Dramatic Score)	Taboo	Nominated	
2018	Hollywood Music in Media Awards	Best Original Score - Feature Film	Mary Queen of Scots	Won	
2021	Grammy Awards	Best Score Soundtrack for Visual Media	Ad Astra	Nominated	
2025	Astra Film Awards	Best Original Score	Hamnet	Nominated	
2025	Hollywood Music in Media Awards	Best Original Score in a Feature Film	Hamnet	Nominated	
2026	Academy Awards	Best Original Score	Hamnet	Nominated	
2026	Golden Globe Awards	Best Original Score	Hamnet	Nominated	
2026	British Academy Film Awards	Best Original Score	Hamnet	Nominated	

== See also ==
- List of postminimalist composers
- Music and sleep
