= Gaia Girace =

Italian actress

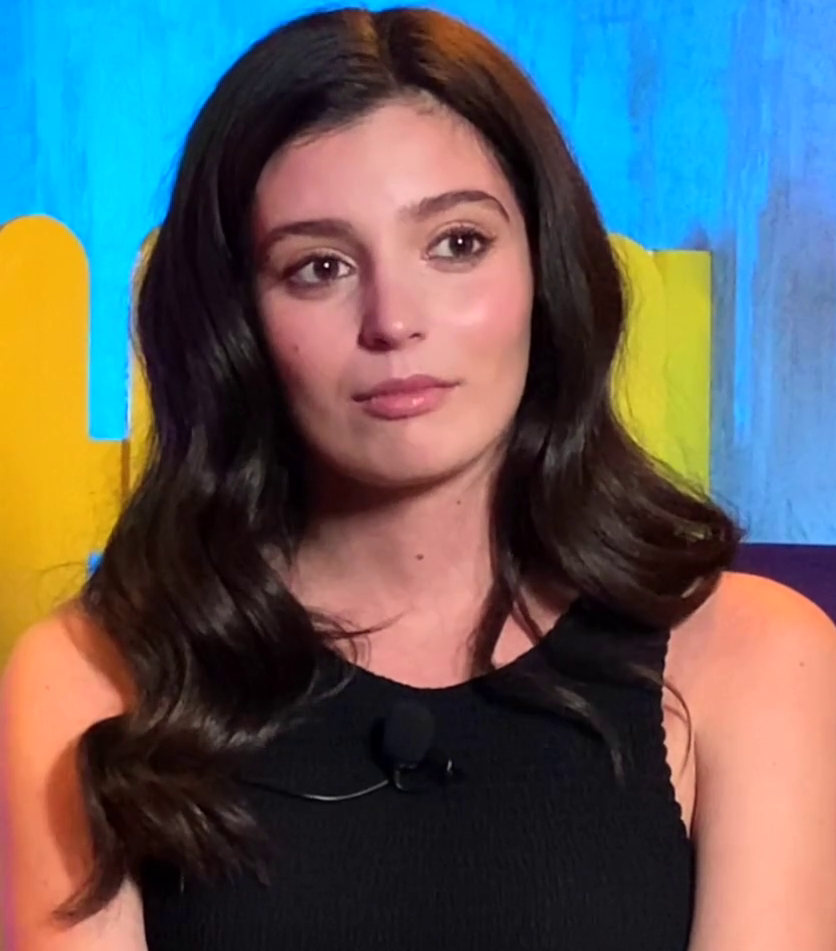
- Girace in 2024
- Born: 21 October 2003 (age 22); Vico Equense, Naples, Italy
- Occupation: Actress
- Years active: 2018–present

Gaia Girace (born 21 October 2003) is an Italian actress. She is best known for her role as Raffaella "Lila" Cerullo in the HBO coming-of-age television series My Brilliant Friend.

== Biography ==
Gaia Girace grew up in Vico Equense, Naples. Her father is a lawyer and her mother works in insurance. She attended the Liceo Classico Publio Virgilio in Meta, and was cast in My Brilliant Friend in her first year.

At the age of 13, Girace began attending acting classes, citing a need to express herself. Soon after, she auditioned for My Brilliant Friend, which had been casting actresses from Naples. She underwent 7 months of auditions before being chosen to play Lila Cerullo out of 10,000 girls.

== Filmography ==
=== Film ===
Year	Title	Role	Notes	Ref.
2021	I santi	Maria	Short film	
2023	Girasoli	Lucia		

=== Television ===
Year	Title	Role	Notes	Ref.
2018-22	My Brilliant Friend	Raffaella "Lila" Cerullo	21 episodes	
2022	The King's Favorite	Catherine de Médicis	2 episodes	
2023	The Good Mothers	Denise Cosco	5 episodes	
