= List of postminimalist composers =

Composers who are considered postminimalist include:

- Thomas Albert (born 1948)
- John Adams (born 1947)
- Beth Anderson (born 1950)
- Louis Andriessen (1939–2021)
- David Borden (born 1938)
- Neely Bruce (born 1944)
- Gavin Bryars (born 1943)
- Mary Ellen Childs (born 1957)
- Michael Daugherty (born 1954)
- Paul Dresher (born 1951)
- William Duckworth (1943–2012)
- Kyle Gann (born 1955)
- Peter Garland (born 1952)
- Janice Giteck (born 1946)
- Kamran Ince (born 1960)
- Olivia Kieffer (born 1947)
- Guy Klucevsek (1947–2025)
- Jonathan Kramer (1942–2004)
- Paul Lansky (born 1944)
- Elodie Lauten (1950–2014)
- Mary Jane Leach (born 1949)
- Daniel Lentz (1942-2025)
- John McGuire (born 1942)
- Ingram Marshall (1942–2022)
- Beata Moon (born 1969)
- Pauline Oliveros (1932–2016)
- Maggi Payne (born 1945)
- Simon Rackham (born 1964)
- Max Richter (born 1966)
- Stephen Scott (1944–2021)
- Christine Southworth (born 1978)
- Michael Torke (born 1961)
- Scott Unrein (born 1976)
- Michael Vincent Waller (born 1985)
- Julia Wolfe (born 1958)
