= Mari Mahr =

Hungarian-British photographer (born 1941)

- Born: 1941 (age 84–85); Santiago, Chile
- Education: Polytechnic of Central London
- Known for: Staged photography, photomontage
- Spouse: Graham Percy
- Children: Yulia Mahr
- Awards: Fox Talbot Award (1989)
- Website: marimahr.com

Mari Mahr (born 1941) is a Chilean-born Hungarian-British photographer who lives in London. She trained as a press photographer in Budapest before moving to London in 1972, where she turned to staged photography, arranging found and cherished objects in front of photographic backgrounds. Her photomontage series I'd Love to Go On Safari won the Fox Talbot Award in 1989. Her work is in the collections of the Victoria and Albert Museum, the National Galleries of Scotland, the British Council and the Arts Council Collection.

== Early life and education ==
Mahr was born in Santiago, Chile, in 1941 to Hungarian-Jewish parents and grew up in Santiago and Budapest. In the early 1960s she studied at the School of Journalism in Budapest and obtained a diploma. She has said that Jean Seberg's role as a young journalist in Jean-Luc Godard's film À bout de souffle inspired her to study journalism. Alongside her studies she trained as a press photographer in the cultural department of the Hungarian News Agency. For two years she carried the equipment of its staff photographers at theatre, literary and music events.

Mahr moved to London in 1972. (Note: Her CV and the Hundred Heroines biography both say that "in 1973 having moved to London she continued her studies at the PCL".) She then studied for a BA in Photographic Arts at the Polytechnic of Central London, where her teachers included Margaret Harker and Victor Burgin.

== Career ==
Mahr had her first solo exhibition at The Photographers' Gallery in London in 1977, and the gallery has shown her work several times since. By 2021 she had held more than eighty solo exhibitions in thirteen countries. Her work was included in the Serpentine Gallery's Summer Show in 1980, and during the 1980s it appeared in exhibitions at the Victoria Miro Gallery. The dealer Zelda Cheatle exhibited and represented her for more than ten years.

Her series of three photomontages, I'd Love to Go On Safari (1987), won the 1989 Fox Talbot Award at the National Museum of Photography, Film and Television in Bradford, which acquired it. Two years later the museum lent her an early digital camera, and she started to work digitally.

Entrance to Mahr's retrospective at the Centro Cultural Parque de España in Rosario, Argentina, 1995

A retrospective organised by the British Council toured Hungary, Argentina, Greece, Chile and Spain between 1994 and 1996. Its venues included the Hungarian Museum of Photography in Kecskemét and the Centro Cultural Parque de España in Rosario. Later solo shows were held at the Yossi Milo Gallery in New York (2003) and the Architectural Association in London (2006). In 2011 her work was shown at three galleries in New Zealand: City Gallery Wellington, the Gus Fisher Gallery in Auckland and the Sarjeant Gallery in Whanganui. In 2015 she exhibited at the Mai Manó House in Budapest. She has given talks and lectures at British art schools and universities, among them the Royal College of Art, the Glasgow School of Art and Napier University in Edinburgh. Kettle's Yard in Cambridge, which owns some of her work, displayed one of her series in its research space in 2025.

== Work ==
Mahr found documentary photography misleading and turned to staged tableaux and photomontage. In her studio she arranges real objects in front of photographic backgrounds and then photographs the set-up again. The objects are often found or cherished things with a personal, historical or symbolic meaning for her. Her daughter, the artist Yulia Mahr, has recalled that the early pictures were made by hand before digital editing and were built like small film sets, with family members often posing for them. The Victoria and Albert Museum names belonging, loss, memory and identity as the themes of her work, which draws on her family's history of migration. According to the National Galleries of Scotland, she "constructs (rather than reconstructs) memory" by linking objects with places.

A Few Days in Geneva (1985), a set of ten photographs, grew out of a visit to friends in Geneva. In it, views taken from the cathedral tower are combined with objects such as sheet music by Chopin. The photographs were published as a book in 1988. Between Ourselves (1991–1992) was first shown in the print room of The Photographers' Gallery, and a book, Between Ourselves: The Photographs of Mari Mahr, with contributions by Amanda Hopkinson, followed in 1998.

Life Chances (1996) is autobiographical and looks at how modern European history shaped her life; in the statement that accompanies it, she calls her life "a series of chances – some missed, others taken". Daughter of an Architect (2003–2004) pays homage to her father, an architect, and to his drawing instruments, which appear at monumental size in the pictures. It was shown at the Architectural Association in London in 2006. Two Walk in Edinburgh was made after her husband, the illustrator Graham Percy, became seriously ill; a paintbrush, an open book and a fob watch are among the objects that recall his life and work. The Holloway Press in Auckland published the photographs in 2011 with poems by Gregory O'Brien. After Percy's death, Mahr began combining his drawings with her own photographs.

== Collections ==
- Victoria and Albert Museum, London
- National Galleries of Scotland, Edinburgh
- British Council Collection
- Arts Council Collection
- Science Museum Group (National Science and Media Museum, Bradford)
- Kettle's Yard, Cambridge
- University of Warwick Art Collection
- National Gallery of Australia, Canberra
- Museum of Fine Arts, Houston
- Tokyo Photographic Art Museum
- Bibliothèque nationale de France, Paris
- Hungarian Museum of Photography

== Publications ==
- A Few Days in Geneva: Photographs. Travelling Light, 1988. ISBN 978-0-906333-21-1.
- Between Ourselves: The Photographs of Mari Mahr. Serpent's Tail, 1998. ISBN 978-1-85242-550-0.
- Two Walk in Edinburgh. Poems by Gregory O'Brien, afterword by Jenny Bornholdt. Holloway Press, 2011.

== Personal life ==
Mahr was married to Graham Percy until his death, and is the mother of Yulia Mahr. She lives in London and also spends time in Berlin.
