= André de Ridder =

German classical conductor

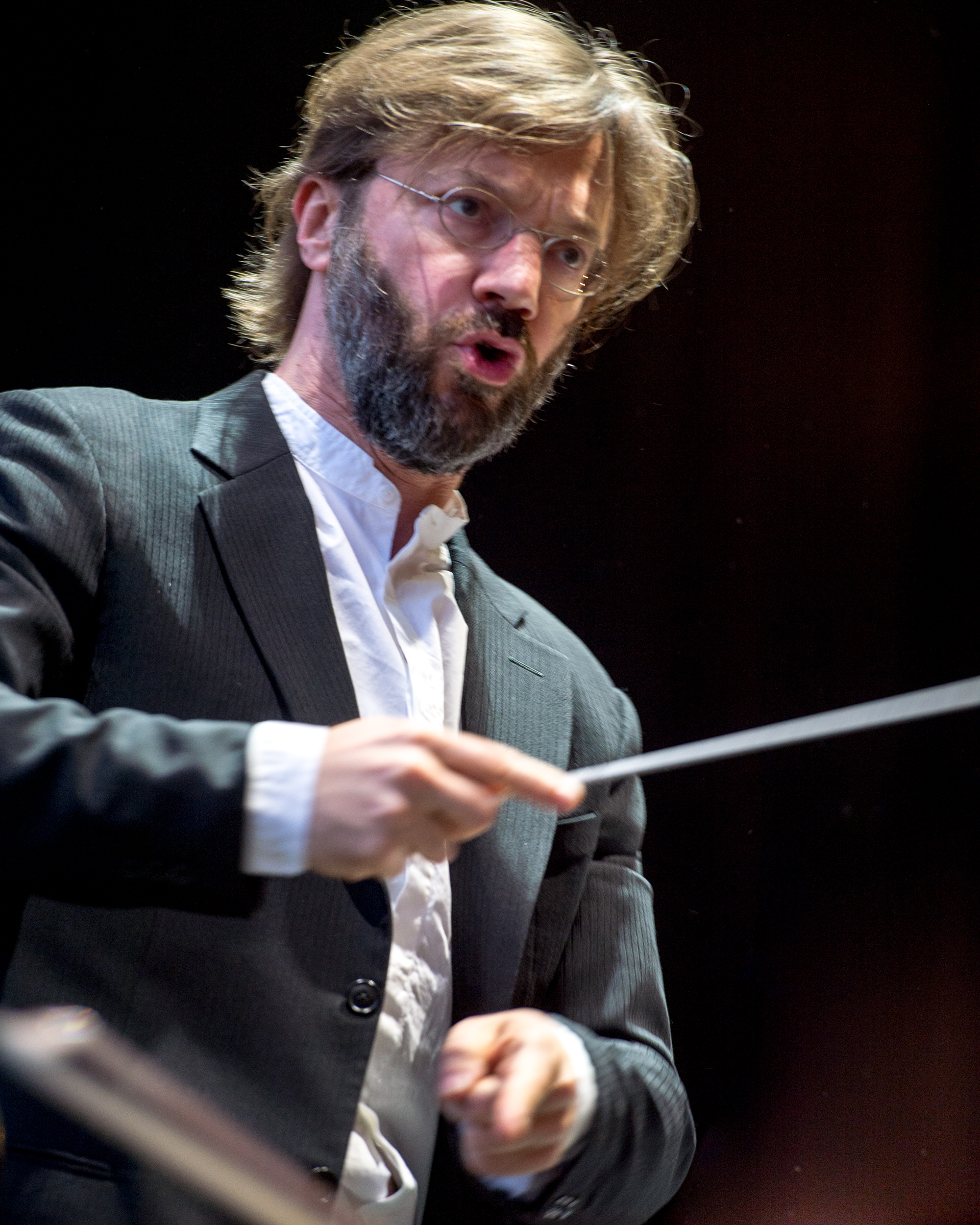
André de Ridder at the Sydney Festival Symphony in the Domain, 2016

André de Ridder (born 1971) is a German conductor.

== Biography ==
Born into a musical family, de Ridder studied conducting with Leopold Hager at the University of Music and Performing Arts, Vienna and with Sir Colin Metters at the Royal Academy of Music in London.

de Ridder is noted for his work in contemporary music. He has collaborated with These New Puritans, Uri Caine, Nico Muhly, Owen Pallett. He has also worked regularly with MusikFabrik, Mouse on Mars, andh Efterklang. From 2007 to 2012, de Ridder was principal conductor of Sinfonia Viva. In 2012, de Ridder founded stargaze, a musical collective devoted to crossing borders between different music genres. stargaze and de Ridder have launched their own spring festival in Berlin. For BBC Radio 3, de Ridder co-curated and was conductor in the Unclassified Live series. In contemporary opera, de Ridder has conducted several world premieres, which include:

- Damon Albarn and Chen Shi-Zheng, Monkey: Journey to the West (Manchester International Festival, 2007)
- Gerald Barry, The Bitter Tears of Petra von Kant (at English National Opera)
- Wolfgang Rihm: Drei Frauen (at the Theater Basel)
- Donnacha Dennehy: The Last Hotel (at the Edinburgh International Festival, 2015)
- Kaija Saariaho: Only the Sound Remains (at the Opera Forward Festival with Dutch National Opera, 2016)
- Daniel Bjarnason: Brothers (at Den Jyske Opera, 2017)

In June 2025 he directed in the Amsterdam Concertgebouw the Netherlands première of “Dream Requiem” of Rufus Wainwright, performed by The Netherlands Philharmonic Orchestra, several choirs, Caitlin Gotimer (soprano) and Carice van Houten (narrator).

In February 2021, the Theater Freiburg and Philharmonisches Orchester announced the appointment of de Ridder as its next Generalmusikdirektor (GMD), effective with the 2022–2023 season, with an initial contract of five years. de Ridder is scheduled to conclude his Freiburg tenure at the close of the 2026–2027 season. In May 2025, English National Opera announced the appointment of de Ridder as its next music director, effective with the 2027–2028 season, and with the title of music director-designate as of September 2025.

In August 2023, de Ridder first guest-conducted the New Zealand Symphony Orchestra (NZSO). In June 2025, the NZSO announced the appointment of de Ridder as its next music director, effective in 2027.

== Selected discography ==
- Gorillaz: Plastic Beach (EMI Records, 2010), nominated for a Grammy
- Damon Albarn: Dr Dee (Virgin Records, 2012)
- Max Richter: Recomposition of Vivaldi's The Four Seasons (Deutsche Grammophon, 2012), received an ECHO Klassik award
- Dirty Projectors, David Longstreth: Song of the Earth (Transgressive Records, 2025)

Cultural offices
Preceded by Nicholas Kok	Principal Conductor, Sinfonia Viva; 2007–2012	Succeeded by Duncan Ward
Preceded by Fabrice Bollon	Generalmusikdirektor, Theater Freiburg; 2022–present	Succeeded by incumbent
