= Sleep (album) =

Studio album by Max Richter
- Released: September 4, 2015
- Recorded: 2015
- Studios: Avatar, New York City, US; AIR, London, UK; StudioKino, Berlin, Germany
- Genres: Ambient; chamber; electronic; drone
- Length: 8:24:21; From Sleep: 59:59
- Label: Deutsche Grammophon
- Producers: Max Richter; Christian Badzura (exec. producer); Yulia Mahr (exec. producer)

Max Richter chronology
Recomposed by Max Richter: Vivaldi – The Four Seasons (2012)	Sleep (2015)	From Sleep (2015)

Sleep is an eight-and-a-half hour concept album based around the neuroscience of sleep by German-British composer Max Richter. It was released on September 4, 2015, accompanied by a one-hour version with variations, From Sleep, later remixed as Sleep Remixes.

In April 2020, the documentary Max Richter's Sleep, directed by Natalie Johns, was released, and focused on Richter and Mahr's performances of Sleep in Los Angeles, Berlin, Sydney, and Paris. The original album was followed by subsequent related releases, including Sleep: Tranquility Base EP (2023), a "faded" edition of Sleep (2024), Sleep: Piano Edition EP (2024), and Sleep Circle (2025).

== Background ==
Sleep was conceived by Richter and his partner, the visual artist Yulia Mahr. It is targeted to fit a full night's rest. Richter talked with American neuroscientist David Eagleman while working on the album's piece to learn about how the brain functions during sleep. Richter stated, "Sleeping is one of the most important things we all do ... We spend a third of our lives asleep and it's always been one of my favourite things, ever since I was a child. ... For me, Sleep is an attempt to see how that space when your conscious mind is on holiday can be a place for music to live."

In the album's credits, Richter describes Sleep as an eight-hour lullaby that is meant to be listened to at night. It is scored for piano, cello, two violas, two violins, organ, soprano vocals, synthesizers and electronics. The piece comprises 31 sections in slow tempo. These range from less than three minutes to over thirty, with an average duration of just over fifteen minutes. The sections are variations of five themes.

Richter structured Sleep as a large set of variations to echo Bach’s Goldberg Variations, which were supposedly written as a cure for the insomnia of the man who commissioned them. "In composing Sleep I have tried to make the experience of the listener, whether sleeping or awake, the centre of the piece."

=== From Sleep ===
The release of Sleep was accompanied by a one-hour album, From Sleep, with seven additional tracks, not present on the eight-hour release, recorded during the same sessions.

From Sleep was promoted by music videos for three tracks: "Dream 13 (Minus Even)," "Path 5 (Delta)" and "Dream 3 (In the Midst of My Life)." Additionally, remixed versions of the three tracks, by Mogwai, Clark, Digitonal, Jürgen Müller, Kaitlyn Aurelia and Marconi Union, have been featured on a subsequent remix EP Sleep Remixes, released digitally on February 19, 2016.

=== Related releases ===
New sequences and selections from Sleep were part of a free sleep music and meditation timer mobile app for iOS, introduced to help users sleep, meditate, and focus.

In April 2020, the documentary Max Richter's Sleep was released. Directed by Natalie Johns, the film follows Richter and Mahr performances during the album's tour including an open-air concert in Los Angeles, and includes performance footage from Berlin, Sydney, and Paris, as well as behind-the-scenes footage.

In March 2023, Sleep: Tranquility Base EP was released, with new versions of themes from Sleep. It was titled after the Tranquility Base on the Moon. Further remixes by Kelly Lee Owens and Alva Noto followed.

In January 2024, a "faded" edition of Sleep was released on streaming platforms.

In March 2024, the Sleep: Piano Edition digital EP was released, with three extended reimagined tracks for solo piano, performed by Richter himself.

For the 10th anniversary of Sleep, on 5 September 2025, Richter released a hypnagogia-themed sequel entitled Sleep Circle. The double-album's release was accompanied by two London shows.

== Live performances ==
Sleep was performed in its entirety from midnight to 8:00 AM at the Wellcome Collection in 2015 as the climax of the BBC Radio 3 "Science and Music" weekend. Audience members watched from beds instead of chairs. The performance set records for the longest broadcast and longest live broadcast of a single piece of music. The album was also performed at the Philharmonie de Paris in 2017, and outdoors in Grand Park, Los Angeles in 2018. The Los Angeles performances had 560 beds and were timed so the final movement, "Dream 0 (till break of day)" would occur at dawn. In late 2025, Sleep was performed at Alexandra Palace in London, and Louis Vuitton Foundation in Paris, to mark the 10th anniversary of the first performances.

== Critical reception ==
Professional ratings
Aggregate scores
Source	Rating
Metacritic	79/100
Review scores
Source	Rating
AllMusic	4/5 stars
Drowned in Sound	9/10
The Guardian	3/5 stars
The Line of Best Fit	8/10
Louder Than War	9/10
Mixmag	6/10
Pitchfork	7.0/10
Record Collector	4/5 stars
Tom Hull – on the Web	A−
Uncut	8/10

Sleep received wide acclaim from contemporary music critics. At Metacritic, which assigns a normalized rating out of 100 to reviews from mainstream critics, the album received an average score of 79, based on 7 reviews, which indicates "generally favorable reviews".

Jon Falcone of Drowned in Sound gave the album a very positive review, stating, "Sleep implores you for companionship and bleeds into itself as it bleeds into the listener. Typing while the fizz of ‘Never Fade Into Nothingness’ plays makes transforms Word documents in an epic dance of black pixels on white light, binary marks scratching into a too-bright glassy reflection. Walking while the echo-drenched monastic vocals of ‘Non-Eternal’ exposes that the world we occupy is haunted is exhilarating and avoiding awkward work colleagues as ‘If You Came This Way’ patters out its motif, that dangles held violin notes over electronic burbles, is to experience the sound of solace itself."

Grayson Haver Currin of Pitchfork gave the album a positive review, stating, "At its best, Sleep feels like compositionally rigorous new age music. It’s a place in which you can settle for a while, with or without a pillow, and emerge only when you are ready to rejoin the restive world." Currin was also slightly critical of the release, stating, "Sleep, then, is simply too didactic as a name. It’s a command that tells us how to enjoy something that clearly has other uses. That handle, combined with Richter’s conceit, has turned the record into a kind of clickbait story, too, which seems entirely antithetical to Richter’s point."

== Commercial performance ==
As of February 2020, Sleep peaked at position 44 in the UK album charts, with sales of 40,151. As of April 2025, Sleep had more than 800 million streams. In 2025, Sleep surpassed two billion streams across all platforms, becoming the first classical record to do so.

== Track listing ==
=== Sleep ===
All tracks are written by Max Richter.

No.	Title	Length
1.	"Dream 1 (before the wind blows it all away)"	18:31
2.	"Cumulonimbus"	10:09
3.	"Dream 2 (entropy)"	10:02
4.	"Path 3 (7676)"	11:00
5.	"whose name is written on water"	11:15
6.	"Patterns (cypher)"	2:47
7.	"Solo"	6:53
8.	"Aria 1"	11:06
9.	"Return 2 (song)"	16:46
10.	"nor earth, nor boundless sea"	19:17
11.	"Dream 11 (whisper music)"	18:54
12.	"moth-like stars"	28:53
13.	"Path 17 (before the ending of daylight)"	26:52
14.	"Space 26 (epicardium)"	6:56
15.	"Patterns (lux)"	16:43
16.	"Constellation 1"	6:56
17.	"Constellation 2"	15:20
18.	"Space 2 (slow waves)"	7:42
19.	"Chorale/glow"	25:29
20.	"Dream 19 (pulse)"	18:53
21.	"Cassiopeia"	19:36
22.	"Non-eternal"	23:50
23.	"Song/echo"	4:59
24.	"Aria 2"	11:02
25.	"never fade into nothingness"	9:41
26.	"Return 16 (time capsule)"	24:25
27.	"if you came this way"	14:29
28.	"Space 17 (chains)"	17:59
29.	"Sublunar"	25:22
30.	"Dream 17 (Alpha)"	28:47
31.	"Dream 0 (till break of day)"	33:47
Total length:		504:21

- The digital release treats the above as one single piece, segueing between each track. On CD, the last songs on each disc, "whose name is written on water", "Dream 11 (whisper music)", "Patterns (lux)", "Chorale/glow", "Song/echo" "if you came this way" and "Sublunar", are lightly extended in order to account for the physical limitations of the medium; these pieces are extended by up to 30 seconds to account for the lack of transitions into the next track.

=== From Sleep ===
No.	Title	Length
1.	"Dream 3 (In The Midst Of My Life)"	10:04
2.	"Path 5 (Delta)"	11:14
3.	"Space 11 (Invisible Pages Over)"	5:16
4.	"Dream 13 (Minus Even)"	8:53
5.	"Space 21 (Petrichor)"	4:48
6.	"Path 19 (Yet Frailest)"	7:51
7.	"Dream 8 (Late And Soon)"	11:53
Total length:		59:59

Rough Trade Shops Special Edition CD2

No.	Title	Length
1.	"Selene"	11:39
2.	"Diffraction Sequence"	4:21
3.	"Origins (ursa major)"	16:02
Total length:		32:02

== Personnel ==
Main personnel

- Max Richter – composer, electronics, liner notes, mixing, organ, piano, primary artist, producer, quotation author, synthesizer
- American Contemporary Music Ensemble – strings (ensemble)
- Grace Davidson – vocals (soprano)
- Brian Snow – cello
- Clarice Jensen – cello
- Caleb Burhans – viola
- Ben Russell – violin
- Yuki Numata Resnick – violin

Additional personnel

- Christian Badzura – project manager
- Tom Bailey – assistant engineer
- Tim Cooper – liner notes
- Rupert Coulson – engineer, mixing
- David Eagleman – liner notes
- Merle Kersten – art direction
- Yulia Mahr – executive producer
- Mandy Parnell – mastering
- Anna-Lena Rodewald – project manager
- Mike Terry – photography
- Alejandro Venguer – engineer
- Mareike Walter – design

== Charts ==
=== Weekly charts ===
Weekly chart performance for Sleep
Chart (2015)	Peak position
Belgian Albums (Ultratop Flanders)	120
Belgian Albums (Ultratop Wallonia)	171
UK Albums (Official Charts)	44
US Top Classical Albums (Billboard)	1
US Heatseekers Albums (Billboard)	4

Chart (2026)	Peak position
US New Age Albums (Billboard)	5

Weekly chart performance for From Sleep
Chart (2015)	Peak position
Belgian Albums (Ultratop Flanders)	18
Belgian Albums (Ultratop Wallonia)	46
Dutch Albums (Album Top 100)	23
German Albums (Offizielle Top 100)	72
Swiss Albums (Schweizer Hitparade)	81
US Top Classical Albums (Billboard)	3
US Heatseekers Albums (Billboard)	12

Weekly chart performance for Sleep Circle
Chart (2025–2026)	Peak position
Belgian Albums (Ultratop Flanders)	99
Belgian Classical Albums (Ultratop 50 Flanders)	1
Belgian Classical Albums (Ultratop 50 Wallonia)	1
French Classical Albums (SNEP)	3
German Albums (Offizielle Top 100)	68
UK Albums Sales (OCC)	59
UK Classical Albums (OCC)	10
UK Classical Artist Albums (OCC)	1
US Top Classical Albums (Billboard)	17

=== Monthly charts ===
Monthly chart performance for Sleep Circle
Chart (2025)	Peak position
German Classical Albums (Offizielle Top 100)	3

=== Year-end charts ===
2025 year-end chart performance for From Sleep
Chart (2025)	Peak position
Belgian Classical Albums (Ultratop 50 Flanders)	29

2025 year-end chart performance for Sleep Circle
Chart (2025)	Peak position
Belgian Classical Albums (Ultratop 50 Flanders)	11
Belgian Classical Albums (Ultratop 50 Wallonia)	28

== Certifications ==
Region	Certification	Certified units/sales
United Kingdom (BPI)	Gold	100,000^{‡}
^{‡} Sales+streaming figures based on certification alone.

== See also ==
- Long Ambients 1: Calm. Sleep. (2016) and Long Ambients 2 (2019), ambient albums by Moby
- Somnium (2001), ambient album by Robert Rich
- Music and sleep
