= 24 Postcards in Full Colour =

Studio album by Max Richter
- Released: July 21, 2008
- Studio: Abbey Road Studios (London, England); CaVa Studios (Glasgow, Scotland); Castlesound Studios (Edinburgh, Scotland); Eastcote Studios (London, England)
- Genre: Contemporary classical; ambient; minimalist
- Length: 33:39
- Label: 130701

Max Richter chronology
Songs from Before (2006)	24 Postcards in Full Colour (2008)	Infra (2010)

Alternative cover
- 2014 reissue cover

24 Postcards in Full Colour is the 2008 album by neo-classical composer Max Richter, released on July 21, 2008 on 130701, an imprint of FatCat Records. The album was reissued on April 25, 2014 on Deutsche Grammophon.

== Critical reception ==
Professional ratings
Review scores
Source	Rating
AllMusic	4/5 stars
Pitchfork	7.7/10

24 Postcards in Full Colour received largely positive reviews from contemporary music critics.

Joe Tangari of Pitchfork Media gave the album a positive review, stating, "This is a frequently haunting album, though it sacrifices a great deal of flow in the name of brevity and variety. Even if no one ever downloads it to a Nokia, the hair-raising violin of "A Sudden Manhattan of the Mind" makes its point just fine as part of the album. And that's the most important thing to remember about this album: the concept is strong, but the music is stronger."

== Track listing ==
All tracks are written by Max Richter.

No.	Title	Length
1.	"The Road Is a Grey Tape"	1:01
2.	"H in New England"	1:50
3.	"This Picture of Us. P."	1:36
4.	"Lullaby from the Westcoast Sleepers"	2:02
5.	"When the Northern Lights/Jasper and Louise"	1:01
6.	"Circles from the Rue Simon – Crubellier"	1:04
7.	"Cascade NW by W"	1:11
8.	"A Sudden Manhattan of the Mind"	2:49
9.	"In Louisville at 7"	1:03
10.	"Cathodes"	1:02
11.	"I Was Just Thinking"	1:00
12.	"A Song for H/Far Away"	2:08
13.	"Return to Prague"	1:02
14.	"Broken Symmetries for Y"	1:00
15.	"Berlin by Overnight"	1:27
16.	"Cradle Song for a (Interstate B3)"	2:11
17.	"Kierling/Doubt"	0:50
18.	"From 553 W Elm Street, Logan Illinois (Snow)"	0:58
19.	"Tokyo Riddle Song"	1:00
20.	"The Tartu Piano"	2:05
21.	"Cold Fusion for G"	0:35
22.	"32 via San Nicolo"	1:23
23.	"Found Song for P."	2:24
24.	"H Thinks a Journey"	0:57
Total length:		33:39

Deutsche Grammophon reissue bonus tracks
No.	Title	Length
25.	"Hope Strings Eternal"	1:16
26.	"So Long Orpheus"	2:23
27.	"Thermodynamics"	0:45
Total length:		38:03

== Release history ==
Country	Date
United Kingdom	August 25, 2008
United States	September 23, 2008
