= Music and sleep =

Listening of music to improve sleep quality

Sleep problems are found to be correlated with poor well-being and low quality of life. Persistent sleeping disturbances can lead to fatigue, irritability, and various health issues. Numerous studies have examined the positive impact of music on sleep quality. As early as 2000 B.C., lullabies were designed to aid infant sleep. For adults with sleep-related disorders, music serves as a useful intervention in reducing stress. Approximately 25% of the population facing sleep difficulties regularly use music as a tool for relaxation. This process can be either self-prescribed or under the guidance of a music therapist.

Music therapy is introduced into the medical field for treating sleeping disorders following scientific experimentations and observations. Compared to other pharmacological methods for improving sleep, music has no reported side effects and is easy to administer. In direct comparisons, music has improved sleep quality greater than audiobooks and has been comparable to sedative hypnotics.

In addition, music can be combined with relaxation techniques such as breathing exercises and progressive muscle relaxation. One review of non-pharmacological sleep aids identified music as the only sleep aid with adequate research. The influence of music on sleep has been investigated across various contexts, exploring how music stimuli can influence different aspects of the sleeping experience. Implications of findings help in building up a more effective procedure of musical therapies to target sleep problems.

== Major empirical findings ==
=== Influence on sleep quality ===
Research suggests that music contributes to higher perceived sleep quality, greater sleep efficiency, longer sleep durations, less sleep disturbance, and less daytime dysfunction for older adults. This was assessed through improved scores on the Pittsburgh Sleep Quality Index (PSQI) questionnaire. Polysomnography investigations have found listening to slow-tempo music increased slow-wave sleep (deep sleep) and reduced rapid eye movement sleep (lighter sleep stage). Music facilitates a large improvement in sleep quality for insomnia patients. Interventions including music-assisted relaxation and listening to music effectively reduce sleep onset latency for people with insomnia. However, several studies found music to have neither positive nor negative effects on subjective sleep quality for normal individuals.

=== Modulation on heart rate and blood pressure ===
Music can reduce sympathetic nervous system activity, decreasing blood pressure and heart rate. The decrease in systolic blood pressure, diastolic blood pressure, and heart rate signal a state of calmness, which is essential for having a good night sleep. Sedative music, which is characterized by a slow tempo, repetitive rhythm, gentle contours, and strings, is effective in generating anxiolytic responses to aid sleep.

=== Brainwave activity and hormonal responses ===
Electroencephalogram (EEG) studies give insights into how music alters brainwave activities during sleep. Gentle and soothing music can lead to increased delta wave activities which indicate deep sleep. Several experiments have tested listening to preferred music significantly decreases cortisol levels and reduces the amount of stress experienced. Saliva melatonin, a hormone associated with sleep initiation, was found to be elevated among people using interactive music therapies. These hormones work in attributing a more conducive environment for falling asleep and maintaining stable sleep stages.

== Mechanisms ==
=== Dickson & Schubert's RPR ===
Dickson & Schubert summarized and evaluated six researcher proposed reasons (RPR) by which music could potentially aid sleep:

- Entrainment: The synchronization of certain biological processes such as neural activity or heart rate with the rhythmic structure of the music. When the rhythmic pattern of music aligns with the natural rhythm of the body, it is more likely to fall asleep quickly.
- Masking: Masking involves using music to mitigate the impact of noxious background noises. By listening to music at a comfortable volume, individuals can block those disruptive sounds from outside and create a peaceful sleeping environment.
- Enjoyment: Listening to preferred, emotionally relatable, or pleasant music can have a positive impact on mood. This induces positive emotions such as happiness, reducing the stress felt to enhance sleep patterns.
- Distraction: Music acts as a distractor to inner stressful thoughts, by providing a focal point of attention. Individuals focusing on the music itself can divert their attention away from worrying thoughts that are keeping them awake.
- Expectation: Individuals held the cultural belief that certain types of music can aid their sleep. This belief would act as a placebo effect rather than a direct contributor to sleep quality. They may improve subjective sleeping experience due to the power of suggestions.
- Relaxation: Music can induce relaxation response by reducing physiological and psychological stress. Slow tempo and calming melodies can reduce heart rate, decrease cortisol level, and alleviate tension. This makes individual easier to fall asleep.

=== Habit formation ===
Dickson & Schubert proposed Habit Formation as an additional RPR under the Arts on Prescription model. Based on classical conditioning, repeated pairing of the music with the intention of sleep can generate a conditioned response. By forming this habit, music alone would be effective in triggering a relaxation response, which signals the body that it is time to sleep. This requires a minimum of three weeks for individuals suffering mild insomnia to become healthy sleepers and continues to improve sleep quality over three months. Music improved sleep quality with increased exposure regardless of differences in the demographic, music genre, duration of treatment, and exposure frequency. Dickson suggests "listening to music that you find relaxing, at the same time, every night for at least three weeks".

== Musical genres and features ==
Typical genres of music used for sleep (sedative music) include classical music, ethnic music, ambient music, meditation music and lullabies, although researchers have recognised a wide diversity of music genres aiding sleep. The characteristics of music that have improved sleep quality in the music-sleep literature include slow tempo, small change of rhythm, and moderate pitch variation of melody. The selection of music (self selected or researcher selected) does not appear to impact sleep quality.

=== Instrumental vs Lyrics ===
Instrumental music such as sitar or violin is recognized as more effective in inducing sleep than vocal music. Although lyric gives depth and meaning to the music, it also stimulates cognitive processes, making it more difficult to fall asleep. Whereas instrumental music focuses on the melody and rhythm, it allows for relaxation without the distraction of lyrics. Research has given evidence for the use of instrumental music in improving sleep quality.

=== Nature Sounds and Binaural Beats ===
Nature sounds like birdsong or rainfall can provoke a feeling of peacefulness and tranquillity to facilitate sleep. Binaural beats work by presenting two different frequencies to each ear that synchronize brainwave activity. Those two methods can be combined to improve sleep quality by targeting both the sensory experience and brainwave alterations.

=== Sedative music developed in collaboration with researchers ===
- Can't Sleep (app) - Gaelen Thomas Dickson (music psychology)
- Pzizz (app) - Maryanne Garry (psychology)
- Marconi Union - Weightless (song) - Lyz Cooper (sound therapy)
- Max Richter - Sleep (album) - David Eagleman (neuroscience)

== Individual variability ==
While many studies have shown the significant influence of soft slow music on sleep, it is essential to acknowledge that this effect is not uniform across all individuals. Extensive research has revealed the variability in individual responses to musical stimuli, which can be due to their personal preference, cultural background, and susceptibility to different music types. Some may find classical music entertaining, while others prefer ambient music for relaxation. Cultural background can also shape an individual's perception and response to music stimuli. The concept of music and sleep, although applicable to the general population, needs to take into account these differences to tailor each individual's taste. By customizing music choices, the overall effectiveness of music in improving sleep can be maximized, contributing to a better life quality for people.

== See also ==
- Long Ambients 1: Calm. Sleep.
- Lullaby
- Music psychology
- Music therapy
- Sleep (album)
- ASMR
