= Yulia Mahr =

Multi-disciplinary visual artist

Yulia Mahr is a multi-disciplinary visual artist who works in a range of media, including photography, moving image, sculpture, and site-specific installation. She is known for her hyper-coloured works as well as black and white analogue imagery.

Her award-winning work often deals with her first-hand experiences of geographical displacement, and reflects on trauma, womanhood and discarded histories. Mahr frequently explores interconnectedness on a micro and macro level, be it social, political or natural and returns to auto-ethnographic methodologies.

== Early life ==
Mahr was born in Budapest, Hungary, to a Chilean-born mother, the photographer Mari Mahr, and a Hungarian father. She moved to England with her mother at the age of seven. She went on to study politics at the London School of Economics and later graduated with an MA in Visual Anthropology from the Freie Universität, Berlin.

== Work ==
Mahr began working in the 1990s at Arts Threshold Theatre Company in London, a forward-thinking theatre company founded by Brian Astbury. There Mahr, an integral member of the company, directed plays on the Mothers of the Disappeared in Argentina and the fall of the Iron Curtain. Previous to this she had taken central roles in a number of alternative performance pieces including a staging of the Mahabharata at the Edinburgh Festival. It was there Mahr met her future partner and artistic collaborator composer Max Richter.

Mahr and Richter have gone on to collaborate artistically across many projects, most notably Sleep, an eight hour overnight performance piece considered a landmark in durational art with performances for the Sydney Opera House, Paris Philharmonie and the Barbican Centre in London amongst others; and Voices celebrating the Universal Declaration of Human Rights.

Mahr’s films for Voices have been viewed many millions of times and her video work for Prelude Two was selected for Creative Review’s “Best Music Video of the Year 2021”. Her video for Mirrors was featured by Aesthetica magazine. Mahr has produced a video with Elisabeth Moss; and a film of the Sleep project which premiered at Sundance Film Festival.

Throughout their successful partnership Mahr has maintained her own artistic practice and in an interview in Upcoming in 2020, she revealed that she would be prioritising this work from then on.

In 2019 Mahr conceptualised and guided the development of a new world class arts complex and recording studio as a physical embodiment of her belief in borderless art and creative communities. Mahr has said, in an interview with Wallpaper “Studio Richter Mahr is about dreaming the future into existence, a better way to live and work. It's about borderless creativity. It's about offering time and opportunities for people to really experiment.” Sited on the edge of a 31-acre woodland in Oxfordshire, the studio, which opened its doors in 2021, is powered by solar and heat pump technology and promotes sustainability and localism as central tenets.

In 2022 Mahr established an independent artistic production house for the visual arts within Studio Richter Mahr.

== Selected solo exhibitions ==
- Unbecoming, Wehrmuehle, 2024
- As it was, so it is, Serchia Gallery, 2025
- The Church of Our Becoming, Courtyard, Dover Street Market Paris, 2025
- Speaking in Dreams, Compton Verney, 2025
