= The Blue Notebooks =

Studio album by Max Richter
- Released: 26 February 2004
- Studios: Eastcote Studios (London, England); Hear No Evil Studios (London, England)
- Genres: Contemporary classical; ambient
- Length: 40:29
- Label: 130701
- Producer: Max Richter

Max Richter chronology
| Memoryhouse (2002) | The Blue Notebooks (2004) | Songs from Before (2006) |

Alternative cover
- 2014 reissue cover

The Blue Notebooks is the second album by neo-classical producer and composer Max Richter. The album was conceived in 2003 and released on 26 February 2004 on 130701, an imprint of FatCat Records. It is a protest album about the 2003 invasion of Iraq and violence in general.

Following the success of his 2012 album Vivaldi Recomposed on the Deutsche Grammophon label, Richter signed many of his previous recordings to DG, including The Blue Notebooks, which was reissued on 29 April 2014.

On 11 May 2018, DG released a two-disc fifteenth-anniversary edition of The Blue Notebooks which includes re-recordings, alternate arrangements, and remixes by Jlin and Konx-Om-Pax.

== Background ==
Richter composed The Blue Notebooks in the run-up to the 2003 invasion of Iraq. He has described it as "a protest album about Iraq, a meditation on violence – both the violence that I had personally experienced around me as a child and the violence of war, at the utter futility of so much armed conflict." The album was recorded about a week after mass protests against the war.

The album features readings from Franz Kafka's The Blue Octavo Notebooks and Czesław Miłosz's Hymn of the Pearl and Unattainable Earth. Both extracts are read by the British actress Tilda Swinton.

== Composition and performance ==
The track "Shadow Journal" was recorded after Richter participated in a demonstration against the Iraq War in London.

== Usage in popular media ==
The tracks "Shadow Journal" and "Organum" were included in the soundtrack of the animated documentary Waltz with Bashir (2008), while the track "Vladimir's Blues" is featured throughout all three seasons of the TV series The Leftovers (2014–2017).

The track "On the Nature of Daylight" has been used extensively throughout cinema and television, including in Stranger than Fiction (2006), Shutter Island (2010), Disconnect (2012), Arrival (2016), Togo (2019), The Handmaid's Tale (2021), The Last of Us (2023), and Hamnet (2025).

== Critical reception ==
Professional ratings
Review scores
| Source | Rating |
|---|---|
| AllMusic | 5/5 stars |
| Pitchfork | 8.7/10 |
| PopMatters | 8/10 |
| Resident Advisor | 4.5/5 |
| Stylus Magazine | B− |
| Tiny Mix Tapes | 4/5 |
| Uncut | 8/10 |

The Blue Notebooks received widespread critical acclaim.

In his positive review, Mark Pytlik of Pitchfork explains,

"The Blue Notebooks is a case study in direct, minor-key melody. Each of the piano pieces [...] establish strong melodic motifs in under two minutes, all the while resisting additional orchestration. Elsewhere, Richter's string suites are similarly striking; "On the Nature of Daylight" coaxes a stunning rise out of gently provincial arrangements while the comparatively epic penultimate track "The Trees" boasts an extended introductory sequence for what is probably the album's closest brush with grandiosity. Richter's slightly less traditional pieces also resound; both the underwater choral hymnal "Iconography" and the stately organ piece "Organum" echo the spiritual ambience that characterized his work for Future Sound of London. There is absolutely nothing exclusive or contrived-feeling about it. In fact, not only is Richter's second album one of the finest of the last six months, it is also one of the most affecting and universal contemporary classical records in recent memory."

In 2019, The Guardian writers ranked The Blue Notebooks the 21st greatest work of art music since 2000, with John Lewis praising "On the Nature of Daylight" as a piece in which "ever-expanding layers of strings are used to heart-tugging effect."

Samuel M. Rothermel had analyzed the work in his Thesis Minimalism in the Twenty-First Century: An Analysis of Max Richter’s The Blue Notebooks.

== Track listing ==
All tracks are written by Max Richter.

| No. | Title | Length |
|---|---|---|
| 1. | "The Blue Notebooks" | 1:19 |
| 2. | "On the Nature of Daylight" | 6:11 |
| 3. | "Horizon Variations" | 1:52 |
| 4. | "Shadow Journal" | 8:22 |
| 5. | "Iconography" | 3:38 |
| 6. | "Vladimir's Blues" | 1:18 |
| 7. | "Arboretum" | 2:53 |
| 8. | "Old Song" | 2:11 |
| 9. | "Organum" | 3:13 |
| 10. | "The Trees" | 7:52 |
| 11. | "Written on the Sky" | 1:40 |
| Total length: | | 40:29 |

The Blue Notebooks: 15 Years Edition
| No. | Title | Length |
|---|---|---|
| 12. | "A Catalogue of Afternoons" | 1:50 |
| 13. | "On the Nature of Daylight" (Orchestral Version) | 6:36 |
| 14. | "Vladimir's Blues 2018" | 1:30 |
| 15. | "On the Nature of Daylight (Entropy)" | 6:54 |
| 16. | "Vladimir's Blues" (Jlin Remix) | 3:45 |
| 17. | "Iconography" (Konx-om-Pax Remix) | 3:56 |
| 18. | "This Bitter Earth / On the Nature of Daylight" (with Dinah Washington) ("This Bitter Earth" written by Clyde Otis) | 6:13 |
| Total length: | | 30:46 |

The Blue Notebooks: 20 Years Edition
| No. | Title | Length |
|---|---|---|
| 12. | "On the Nature of Daylight" (Piano Version) | 5:57 |
| 13. | "Vladimir's Blues" (Jlin Remix) | 3:45 |
| 14. | "On the Nature of Daylight" (Orchestral Version) | 6:36 |
| 15. | "Iconography" (Konx-om-Pax Remix) | 3:56 |
| 16. | "On the Nature of Daylight" (Entropy) | 6:54 |
| 17. | "Vladimir's Blues 2018" | 1:30 |
| 18. | "Cypher" | 7:43 |
| 19. | "A Catalogue of Afternoons" | 1:51 |
| 20. | "This Bitter Earth / On the Nature of Daylight" (with Dinah Washington) ("This Bitter Earth" written by Clyde Otis) | 6:13 |
| Total length: | | 44:24 |

Featured readings:

- Track 1 reading from "The First Notebook" in Franz Kafka's The Blue Octavo Notebooks
- Track 4 reading from "At Dawn" in Czesław Miłosz's Unattainable Earth
- Track 7 reading from "The Third Notebook" in Franz Kafka's The Blue Octavo Notebooks
- Track 8 reading from "The Fourth Notebook" in Franz Kafka's The Blue Octavo Notebooks
- Track 10 reading from "The Wormwood Star" movement of "The Separate Notebooks" in Czesław Miłosz's Hymn Of The Pearl

== Personnel ==
Credits adapted from The Blue Notebooks: 15 Years Edition interior booklet:

- Reader: Tilda Swinton (1, 4, 7, 8, 10)
- Piano: Max Richter (1, 3, 6, 8, 10, 11, 12, 14-16)
- Electronics: Max Richter (1, 3-5, 7-10, 17)
- Violins: Louisa Fuller and Natalia Bonner (2, 4, 7, 10, 15, 18)
- Viola: John Metcalfe (2, 4, 7, 10, 15, 18)
- Cellos: Philip Sheppard and Chris Worsey (2, 4, 7, 10, 18); Chris Worsey and Ian Burdge (15)
- Max Richter Orchestra conducted by Lorenz Dangel (13)
- Vocals: Dinah Washington (18)

== Certifications ==
| Region | Certification | Certified units/sales |
|---|---|---|
| United Kingdom (BPI) | Silver | 60,000^{‡} |
^{‡} Sales+streaming figures based on certification alone.

== Release history ==
| Country | Date |
|---|---|
| United Kingdom | 26 February 2004 |
| United States | 18 May 2004 |
| United States | 11 May 2018 |
