= Songs from Before (Max Richter album) =

Studio album by Max Richter
- Released: October 23, 2006
- Studio: Eastcote Studios (London, England); The Exchange Studios (London, England)
- Genre: Contemporary classical; ambient
- Length: 37:18
- Label: 130701

Max Richter chronology
The Blue Notebooks (2004)	Songs from Before (2006)	24 Postcards in Full Colour (2008)

Alternative cover
- 2014 reissue cover

Songs from Before is the third solo album by neo-classical composer Max Richter, released on October 23, 2006 on 130701, an imprint of FatCat Records.

The album was reissued on April 25, 2014 on Deutsche Grammophon.

== Critical reception ==
Professional ratings
Review scores
Source	Rating
Pitchfork	8.3/10

Songs from Before received largely positive reviews from contemporary music critics.

Pitchfork gave the album a positive review, stating, "Richter takes techniques from the classics and modifies their approach to make more appropriate—but no less efficacious—statements for his own circumstances. Given Songs from Before's thematic conceit, this is appropriate: Richter isn't interested in changing the way the world hears his music as much as idealizing how he wants to hear it. He resurrects past idols for present idioms, his heroes, proclivities and experiences donned as unrepentantly as the nostalgia at Songs' core."

== Track listing ==
All tracks are written by Max Richter.

No.	Title	Length
1.	"Song"	4:12
2.	"Flowers for Yulia"	6:50
3.	"Fragment"	1:41
4.	"Harmonium"	4:21
5.	"Ionosphere"	1:27
6.	"Autumn Music 1"	3:54
7.	"Time Passing"	1:51
8.	"Sunlight"	5:35
9.	"Lullaby"	0:53
10.	"Autumn Music 2"	3:49
11.	"Verses"	1:43
12.	"From the Rue Vilin"	1:02
Total length:		37:18

Deutsche Grammophon reissue bonus tracks
No.	Title	Length
13.	"Leo"	2:26
Total length:		39:44

The album features readings from a number of novels by Haruki Murakami, all read by Robert Wyatt.

- Dance Dance Dance (track 2, Flowers For Yulia)
- Norwegian Wood (track 4, Harmonium)
- South of the Border, West of the Sun (track 7, Time Passing, and track 9, Lullaby)
- Sputnik Sweetheart (track 11, Verses)

== Personnel ==
Musicians

- Max Richter – piano
- Chris Worsey – cello
- Natalia Bonner – violin
- Ian Burdge – cello
- Robert Wyatt – readings

Production

- Max Richter – producer, mixing
- Mark Rankin, Anna Tjan – engineer
- Nic Shonfeld – photography

== Release history ==
Country	Date
United Kingdom	October 23, 2006
United States	October 30, 2006
