= Recomposed by Max Richter: Vivaldi – The Four Seasons =

Studio album by Max Richter
- Released: August 31, 2012
- Recorded: March 12–13, 2012
- Studio: B-Sharp, Berlin, Germany
- Genre: Contemporary classical; post-minimalist; baroque
- Length: 43:58
- Label: Universal; Deutsche Grammophon
- Producer: Max Richter

Max Richter chronology
Infra (2010)	Recomposed by Max Richter: Vivaldi – The Four Seasons (2012)	Sleep (2015)

Alternative cover
- 2014 Deutsche Grammophon cover

Alternative cover
- 2014 Deutsche Grammophon cover

Recomposed by Max Richter: Vivaldi – The Four Seasons is a composition by contemporary classical composer Max Richter. The piece is a complete recomposition and reinterpretation of Vivaldi's violin concertos The Four Seasons. Although Richter said that he had discarded 75 percent of Vivaldi's original material, the parts he does use are phased and looped, emphasising his grounding in postmodern and minimalist music.

A version by Daniel Hope (violin) with the Konzerthausorchester Berlin under the direction of André de Ridder was released on August 31, 2012 on Universal Classics and Jazz (Germany), a division of Universal Music Group, and Deutsche Grammophon, prior to its first live performance. It has since been recorded by other artists.

== Premieres in the concert hall ==
Richter's recomposed version of Vivaldi's The Four Seasons was premiered in the UK at the Barbican Centre on 31 October 2012, performed by the Britten Sinfonia, conducted by André de Ridder, with violinist Daniel Hope. The US launch concert in New York at Le Poisson Rouge was recorded by NPR and streamed live.

== Discography ==
The Deutsche Grammophon album was played by the violinist Daniel Hope and the Konzerthaus Kammerorchester Berlin symphony orchestra, and conducted by André de Ridder. On the album, Hope plays the "Ex-Lipinski" violin, an instrument made by Giuseppe Guarneri del Gesù in 1742 and made available to the violinist by a German family who asked to remain anonymous. The album topped the iTunes classical chart in the UK, Germany, and the US.

The Rubicon Classics recording features soloist Fenella Humphreys and the Covent Garden Sinfonia, conducted by Ben Palmer. Humphreys recorded using a violin from the circle of Peter Guarneri of Venice, made in 1727.

Richter recorded a new version of the Four Seasons in 2022 alongside violinist Elena Urioste and the Chineke! Orchestra and released it as The New Four Seasons – Vivaldi Recomposed.

== Critical reception ==
Recomposed by Max Richter: Vivaldi – The Four Seasons received widespread acclaim from contemporary classical music critics.

Ivan Hewett of The Telegraph gave the album a very positive review, stating:

As you would expect of a composer who once studied with the great modernist Luciano Berio, Richter is very self-aware. He notices that his own taste in repeating patterns doesn’t mesh with the apparently similar patterns in Vivaldi. They obey a different logic, and the friction between them generates a fascinatingly ambiguous colour. Richter teases out and heightens this colour, sometimes with Vivaldi uppermost, sometimes himself. It is a subtle and often moving piece of work, which suggests that after years of tedious disco and trance versions of Mozart, the field of the classical remix has finally become interesting.

== Track listing ==
All tracks are written by Max Richter.

No.	Title	Length
1.	"Spring 0"	0:42
2.	"Spring 1"	2:31
3.	"Spring 2"	3:19
4.	"Spring 3"	3:09
5.	"Summer 1"	4:11
6.	"Summer 2"	3:59
7.	"Summer 3"	5:01
8.	"Autumn 1"	5:42
9.	"Autumn 2"	3:08
10.	"Autumn 3"	1:45
11.	"Winter 1"	3:01
12.	"Winter 2"	2:51
13.	"Winter 3"	4:39
Total length:		43:58

Electronic Soundscapes by Max Richter
No.	Title	Length
14.	"Shadow 1"	3:53
15.	"Shadow 2"	2:30
16.	"Shadow 3"	3:33
17.	"Shadow 4"	2:33
18.	"Shadow 5"	3:01
Total length:		59:28

Remixes
No.	Title	Length
19.	"Spring 1" (Max Richter Remix)	4:58
20.	"Summer 3" (Robot Koch Remix)	3:28
21.	"Autumn 3" (Fear of Tigers Remix – Radio Edit)	4:06
22.	"Winter 3" (NYPC Remix)	4:59
Total length:		76:59

== Personnel ==
Main personnel

- Max Richter – composer, mixing, producer, quotation author
- André de Ridder – conductor
- Daniel Hope – primary artist, violin [solo]
- Raphael Alpermann – harpsichord
- Konzerthaus Kammerorchester Berlin – orchestra
- Alexander Kahl – cello
- David Drost – cello
- Nerina Mancini – cello
- Ying Guo – cello
- Ernst-Martin Schmidt – viola
- Felix Korinth – viola
- Katja Plagens – viola
- Matthias Benker – viola
- Alicia Lagger – violin [first]
- Christoph Kulicke – violin [first]
- Karoline Bestehorn – violin [first]
- Sayako Kusaka – violin [first], concertmaster
- Cornelia Dill – violin [second]
- Jana Krämer – violin [second]
- Johannes Jahnel – violin [second]
- Ulrike Töppen – violin [second]
- Ronith Mues – harp
- Georg Schwärsky – double bass
- Jorge Villar Paredes – double bass
- Sandor Tar – double bass

Additional personnel

- Antonio Vivaldi – original material
- Felix Feustel – product manager
- Neil Hutchinson – recording engineer, mixing
- Christian Kellersmann – original concept
- Nick Kimberley – liner notes
- Götz-Michael Rieth – mastering engineer
- Mandy Parnell – mastering engineer
- Matthias Schneider – project manager
- Erik Weiss – photography
- Jenni Whiteside – editing
- Double Standards – art direction

== Charts ==
=== Weekly charts ===
2014 weekly chart performance for Recomposed by Max Richter: Vivaldi – The Four Seasons
Chart (2014)	Peak position
Austrian Albums (Ö3 Austria)	30
Belgian Albums (Ultratop Flanders)	65
Belgian Albums (Ultratop Wallonia)	89
Danish Albums (Hitlisten)	27
Dutch Albums (Album Top 100)	28
French Albums (SNEP)	85
German Albums (Offizielle Top 100)	48
Italian Albums (FIMI)	99
Swiss Albums (Schweizer Hitparade)	86

2018 weekly chart performance for Recomposed by Max Richter: Vivaldi – The Four Seasons
Chart (2018)	Peak position
New Zealand Heatseeker Albums (RMNZ)	5

2025 weekly chart performance for Recomposed by Max Richter: Vivaldi – The Four Seasons
Chart (2025–2026)	Peak position
French Classical Albums (SNEP)	16

2022 weekly chart performance for The New Four Seasons – Vivaldi Recomposed
Chart (2022)	Peak position
Belgian Albums (Ultratop Flanders)	34
Belgian Albums (Ultratop Wallonia)	97
German Albums (Offizielle Top 100)	18
Portuguese Albums (AFP)	38
Scottish Albums (OCC)	11
Swiss Albums (Schweizer Hitparade)	57
UK Albums (OCC)	100
US Top Classical Albums (Billboard)	7

=== Monthly charts ===
Monthly chart performance for Recomposed by Max Richter: Vivaldi – The Four Seasons
Chart (2025)	Peak position
German Classical Albums (Offizielle Top 100)	1

=== Year-end charts ===
2025 year-end chart performance for Recomposed by Max Richter: Vivaldi – The Four Seasons
Chart (2025)	Peak position
Belgian Classical Albums (Ultratop 50 Flanders)	7
Belgian Classical Albums (Ultratop 50 Wallonia)	13

2025 year-end chart performance for The New Four Seasons – Vivaldi Recomposed
Chart (2025)	Peak position
Belgian Classical Albums (Ultratop 50 Flanders)	8
Belgian Classical Albums (Ultratop 50 Wallonia)	17
