= Mandy Parnell =

British audio mastering engineer

Mandy Parnell is a British mastering engineer and founder of Black Saloon Studios in London, England, where she serves as the senior mastering engineer. Parnell has worked on projects with a wide variety of artists, including Aphex Twin, Bjork, Brian Eno, Feist, Frightened Rabbit, Jamie xx, The Knife, Max Richter, Sigur Ros, Tom Jones, and The xx.

== Career ==
Mandy Parnell studied music and music technology throughout her school, college and university years, training and working in recording studios, until landing an internship at a mastering studio where she worked her way up through the ranks. She has over 25 years of experience, with her work being nominated and awarded numerous prizes including Grammy Awards and Mastering Engineer of the Year 2015 at the Music Producers Guild (MPG) Awards.

Mandy Parnell is an active member of the Audio Engineering Society (AES), and has lectured about mastering at international AES conventions in Los Angeles, Paris, New York and the UK.

== Awards and nominations ==
- Short listed, Mastering Engineer of the Year, MPG Awards 2014.
- Winner, Mastering Engineer of the Year, MPG Awards 2015.
- Short listed, Mastering Engineer of the Year (Jamie xx: In Colour), MPG Awards 2016.
