= Anita Raja =

Italian translator and writer (born 1953)

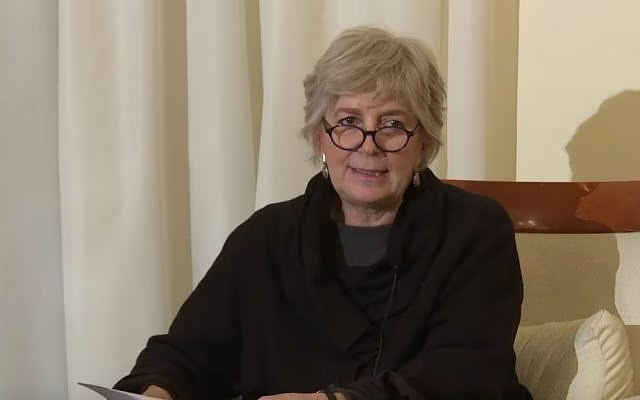
- Lecturing at NYU, Florence, 2015
- Born: Anita Raja; 5 April 1953 (age 73); Naples, Italy
- Occupations: Translator and Author
- Years active: 1980–present
- Spouse: Domenico Starnone
- Children: Viola Starnone

Anita Raja (born 5 April 1953) is a prize-winning Italian literary translator and library director. She is chiefly known for translating most of the Christa Wolf works from German to Italian. She is also known for translating poetry and prose by authors: Franz Kafka, Hans Magnus Enzensberger, Ilse Aichinger, Hermann Hesse, Sarah Kirsch, The Brothers Grimm and Bertolt Brecht into Italian.

Anita Raja is widely presumed to be the Italian novelist writing under the pen name Elena Ferrante, whose Neapolitan Novels became an international publishing phenomenon.

== Early life and education ==
Anita Raja was born in 1953 in Naples, Italy, the daughter of a teacher named Golda Frieda Petzenbaum, and Renato Raja, a Neapolitan magistrate. Raja's maternal family was Polish-Jewish though her mother was born in Worms, in Germany. The family fled Nazi Germany for Italy in 1937. From the age of 3, Anita Raja was raised in Rome.

== Career ==
=== Translation ===
Anita Raja has translated many literary works from German to Italian. Authors of these works include Christa Wolf, Franz Kafka, The Brothers Grimm, Hermann Hesse, and Bertolt Brecht as well as Ilse Aichinger, Irmtraud Morgner, Sarah Kirsch, Christoph Hein, Ingeborg Bachmann, Georg Büchner, Helga Königsdorf, Hans Magnus Enzensberger, and Veit Heinichen. Raja has written articles on Italian and German literature and on the philosophy of translation. As a translator, "Raja has been particularly devoted to the work of Christa Wolf, well known for her explorations of Communist life in East Germany and her feminist reinterpretations of ancient Greek tales", wrote Rachel Donadio in The Atlantic in 2018.

=== Translating Christa Wolf ===
After Christa Wolf's death, in 2011, Raja wrote a short essay to commemorate her mentor and inspiration, who had also become a dear friend:

"The assiduous study of the words of an author generates affinity, closeness. If the person writing is a great writer, translating becomes an experience that profoundly enriches she who translates. Her work of verbalization acted upon my poorer and more common work of welcoming into my language. Her work strengthened mine, leading me to paths I never would have thought of taking. To the point that I had the impression that the texts of Christa were expressing me, that I would have liked to write them just as they were written, that Christa wrote them thinking of me. But translating Christa Wolf I also—and above all—came to understand that the relationship between two languages ends up developing though the relationship between two people: and Christa, whom I met in 1984, revealed herself from the very first moment to be a model of humanity, closeness, concreteness, curiosity, attention, generosity. Always, right up to the end, when we heard from each other, she would first of all ask questions about children, family, health, work, about politics and vacations, about common and quotidian things, at length and with real attention, and then almost seamlessly we would be talking about books or problems of translation."

=== Talks and lectures ===
Raja's talks at the University of Bologna in 2015 include Tradurre Letteratura (Translating Literature) 2015, La traduzione letteraria come ponte fra due culture (Literary Translation as a Bridge Between Two Cultures) 2015, and Interpretatione e Traduzione (Interpretation and Translation) 2012. At the Literary Festival of Mantova, in September 2014, Raja spoke with Sandra Petrignani and Liliana Rampello on Rewriting the Lives of Famous Writers (Margaritte Duras, Jane Austin and Christa Wolf respectively).

In a much published lecture, Translation as a Practice of Acceptance, at the New York University at Villa La Pietra near Florence in 2015, Raja said "For thirty-five years I have had a secondary but constant side job as a literary translator from German. I have translated—and continue to translate—essentially for pleasure. Since translation for me has never been a job to pay the bills, I have always been able to choose the texts that interest me, texts of good, even lofty, literary quality, texts requiring an intense involvement."

=== Writing ===
In 2016, the Italian journalist Claudio Gatti published the claim that Raja was the author behind the pen name Elena Ferrante. He gained access to a document showing payments from Ferrante's publisher commensurate with a large increase in book sales. The quartet of Neapolitan Novels by Elena Ferrante that begins with My Brilliant Friend has sold more than 5.5 million sets in 42 countries, with more than 2 million copies sold in the United States. It is published in America by Europa Editions. In 2017, Arjuna Tuzzi and Michele A. Cortelazzo of the University of Padova published research comparing the use of the Italian language in Ferrante's seven published novels with 150 novels by 39 authors, published in Italian over the preceding 30 years. The question of Ferrante's identity continued in 2018 when My Brilliant Friend was dramatised on HBO and RAI TV and on stage in London at the Royal National Theatre. By mid 2024, the New York Times was still publishing articles about the real identity of Elena Ferrante.

Ferrante has said in many email interviews organised via her publishers, that being anonymous is crucial to her writing. "I have gained a space of my own, a space that is free, where I feel active and present. To relinquish it would be very painful." Whatever the identity of Elena Ferrante, which a great many fans would prefer to leave unexplored, the feminist view is central to the work of Christa Wolf, the German writer most often foregrounded by Anita Raja in her work as translator. For her part, Ferrante has said in an interview, “We women have been pushed to the margins, towards subservience, even when it comes to our literary work. The female story, told with increasing skill, increasingly widespread and unapologetic, is what must now assume power."

=== Other work ===
Raja was the Director of the municipal European Library (Biblioteca Europea) in Rome, a collaboration between the Goethe Institute and the European Parliament, until retiring from the post in 2015. Raja is a long time editorial consultant at Edizioni E/O, which has published most of her translations and other works. The company has offices in Rome, Milan, London and New York and Europea Editions is their American imprint.

== Personal life ==
Raja is married to the novelist and screenwriter Domenico Starnone; they have one daughter together, classicist and translator Viola Starnone.

== Awards ==
In 2007, Raja received a German–Italian translator award.

In 2008, she won the Italo-German prize for literary translation. awarded by the German Foreign Ministry and the Italian Ministry of Culture and Mass-Media, in association with the Goethe Institute.

In 2026, Raja is awarded the Goethe Medal.

== Translations – German to Italian ==
- 1982 Nozze a Costantinopoli, Irmtraud Morgner, Edizioni e/o
- 1984 Cassandra, Christa Wolf, Edizioni e/o
- 1989 Recita Estiva, Christa Wolf, Edizioni e/o
- 1989 Bolero e Altri Racconti, Helga Königsdorf, (trans Anita Raja and Giuseppina Oneto) Edizione e/o
- 1990 Che Cosa Resta, Christa Wolf, Edizioni e/o
- 1992 Trama d'Infanzia, Christa Wolf, Edizioni e/o
- 1992 In Carne ed Ossa Christa Wolf Edizioni e/o
- 1993 Premesse a Cassandra, Christa Wolf, Edizioni e/o
- 1995 Il Processo (The Trial), Franz Kafka, Feltrinelli
- 1995 Frammenti (Fragments), Franz Kafka, Feltrinelli
- 1995 Sotto i Tigli, Christa Wolf, Edizioni e/o
- 1995 Congedo dai fantasmi, Christa Wolf, Edizioni e/o
- 1997 Medea, Christa Wolf, Edizioni e/o
- 1997 Guasto: Notizie di un giorno, Christa Wolf, Edizioni e/o
- 2006 Un Giorno all'anno, Christa Wolf, Edizioni e/o
- 2008 Con Un Sgaurdo Diverso, Christa Wolf, Edizioni e/o
- 2009 Nessun Luogo da Nessuna Parte, Christa Wolf, Edizioni e/o
- 2012 August, Christa Wolf, Edizioni e/o
- 2012 La Città degli Angeli, Christa Wolf, Edizioni e/o
- 2012 Riflessioni su Christa T, Christa Wolf, Edizioni e/o
- 2013 Quel Che Ho Visto e Udito a Roma, Ingeborg Bachmann, Quadlibet
- 2015 Parla, cosi ti vediamo, Christa Wolf, Edizioni e/o
- 2016 Ballata di chi approva questo mondo, Bertolt Brecht, Orecchio acerbo
- 2016 Morte di Danton, Georg Büchner, Einaudi
- 2017 I Morti del Carso, Veit Heinichen, Edizioni e/o
- 2021 Il Cavagliere del Secchio, Franz Kafka, TopiPittori
