= Domenico Starnone =

Italian writer (born 1943)

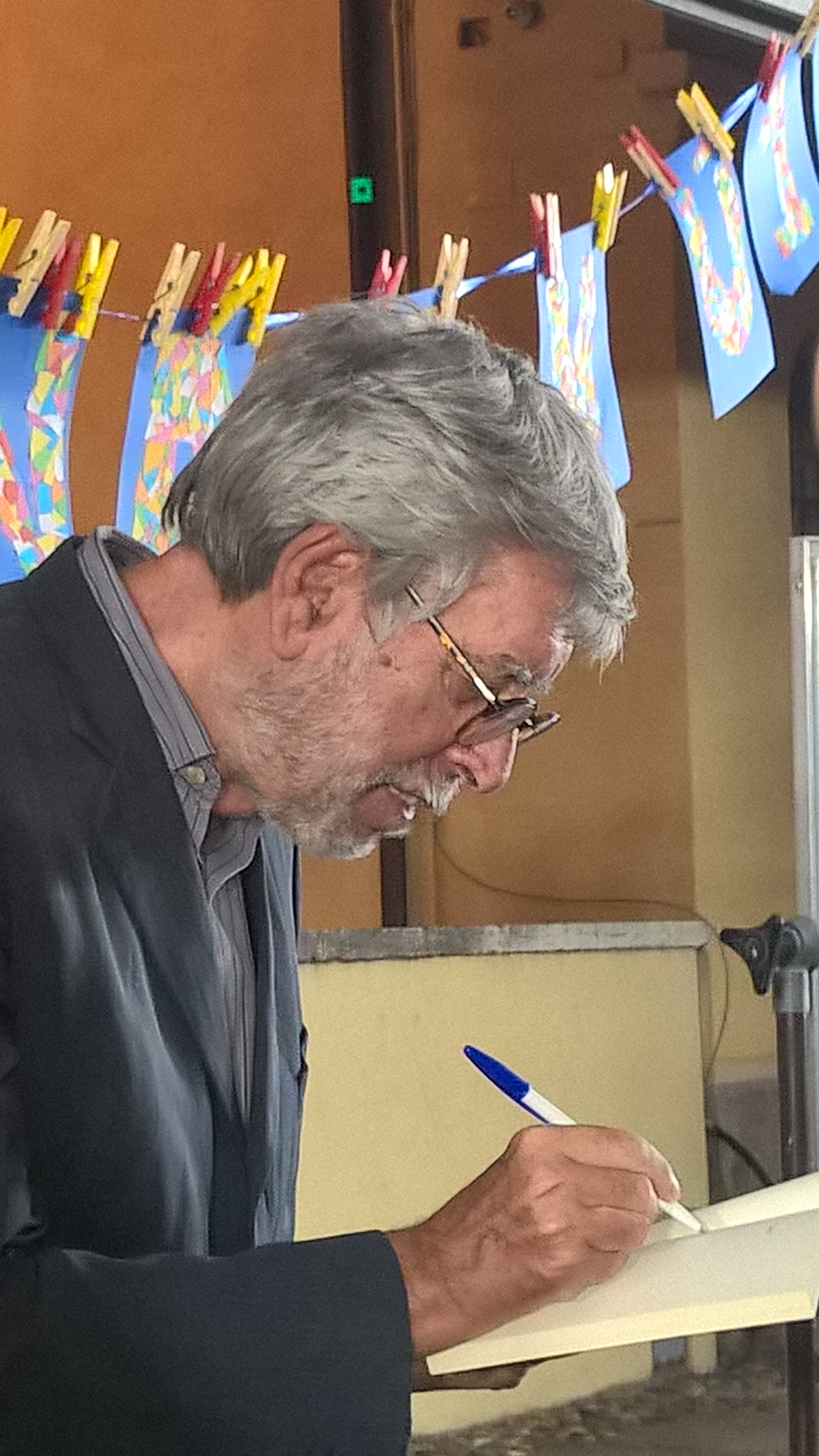
- Born: 15 February 1943 (age 83); Saviano, Naples
- Occupations: Novelist, journalist, teacher and screenwriter
- Years active: 1970-present
- Spouse: Anita Raja

Domenico Starnone (born 15 February 1943) is an Italian writer, screenwriter, and journalist.

His work has been translated into English, German and several other languages. These include Prima esecuzione (2007, as First Execution, 2009) and Confidenza (2019, as Trust, 2019).

His novel Via Gemito won Italy's highest literary honour, the Strega Prize, as well as the Naples Prize for Literature, in 2001 and was also a finalist in the prestigious Campiello Prize prize that year. Said to be his masterpiece, the novel centers on a Neopolitan train conductor, Federí, facing a life filled with frustration, who unloads his dissatisfaction on his wife and eldest son, the novel's narrator. Translated into English by Oonagh Stransky, The House on Via Gemito was longlisted for the International Booker Prize in 2024.

His thirteenth work of fiction, Ties, was his second to be translated into English and was awarded the Bridge Prize in 2017, The Bridge Book Award project seeks to unite Italian and American cultures and strengthen mutual understanding.

In reports dated 2006 (by Luigi Galella), and more recent work in 2017 by Arjuna Tuzzi and Michele A. Cortelazzo of the University of Padova, Starnone—or alternatively, his wife, Anita Raja—has been proposed as the author writing under the pen name, Elena Ferrante. In published interviews, Ferrante has dismissed the allegations: "My identity, my sex can be found in my writing."

== Early life and education ==
Domenico Starnone was born on 15 February 1943 in Saviano in Campania, roughly 25 kilometers northeast of Naples. His father Federico Starnone was a struggling, self-taught Neapolitan painter and his mother was called Rosa.

== Career ==
=== As novelist ===
Starnone is a prolific author, having penned at least 22 works since 1987. He has been quoted in an online interview saying 'writing isn't just fun...the best books are the ones that hurt us.'

Translations of his novels from Italian into English include Prima esecuzione (2007) as First Execution (2009), Lacci (2014) as Ties (2017), Scherzetto (2016) as Trick (2018), and Confidenza (2019) as Trust or Secrets (2019). His novel Via Gemito (The House on Via Gemito) won the Premio Strega in 2001.

=== Teaching and journalism ===
Starnone taught literature at the Marconi High School in Colleferro in Rome for several years early in his career and during the same period, at the Livia Bottardi technical college. In 2017 he taught the works of Italo Calvino at Georgetown University USA.

As a journalist, he was a regular contributor to the cultural pages of Il Manifesto, working for several newspapers and satirical magazines, including L'Unità, Corriere della Sera, Tango, La Repubblica and until 2023 he was editor of the weekly column Parole in the magazine Internazionale. For Cuore, he regularly presented episodes from his life as a teacher.

=== Screenwriting and film adaptations ===
Starnone (not to be confused with Italian screenwriter Federico Starnone) is a film and television script writer.

Feature films based on Starnone books have been directed by Gabriele Salvatores, Riccardo Milani, and Daniele Luchetti and he has written many screenplays for big and small screen himself.

The feature films La scuola and The Ties (both directed by Daniele Luchetti), Auguri Professore (directed by Riccardo Milani) and Denti (directed by Gabriele Salvatores) are based on Starnone novels.

He won the Sergio Amidei prize for best adapted screenplay with Ricardo Milani in 2003 for Il posto dell'anima, and has been nominated for three Golden Ciak Awards.

Starnone has been nominated along with several writing partners for Nastro d'Argento Silver Ribbon awards for best original screenplay and best adapted screenplay for La febbre (The Fever), L'amore ritorna (Love Returns), L'anima gemella (Soul Mate), Del perduto amore (1999) (Of Lost Love), and La scuola (1996). Many are adapted from his own novels.

Starnone and his co-screenwriter Francesco Piccolo were nominated for a 2021 Best Adapted Screenplay award for Lacci or Ties (adapted from his own novel) at the David di Donatello Awards given by the Accademia del Cinema Italiano.

A TV series on Rai 1 called Fuoriclasse (in English: A League of Their Own) ran for three seasons 2011-2015, written by Starnone and based on several of his novels (Ex cattedra, Fuori registro, and Sottobanco) starring Luciana Littizzetto.

In 2021, the US journal "Reading in Translation" dedicated a special issue to Domenico Starnone's body of work, titled "Reading Domenico Starnone" (edited by Enrica Maria Ferrara and Stiliana Milkova) that made a strong case for some of his novels to be translated into English.

== Links to Elena Ferrante ==
In 2006, Luigi Galella claimed that computer analysis of textual style supported the conclusion that Starnone was in fact Elena Ferrante.

In 2016, Italian journalist Claudio Gatti published a further claim that Anita Raja, Starnone's wife, had received financial benefits commensurate with the best-selling Naples Quartet and that she must be their author.

A two-part journalistic investigation by Gatti was commissioned by Il Sole 24 Ore and scheduled to appear on October 2, 2016 in the German newspaper Frankfurter Allgemeine Zeitung and the French website Mediapart

In a collection of interviews published in 2016, the Frantumaglia: A Writer's Journey, Ferrante addressed the speculations, writing that she and Starnone were "tired of everyone asking if he's Ferrante."

In 2017, Arjuna Tuzzi and Michele A. Cortelazzo of the University of Padova, Italy compared the use of language by Elena Ferrante in 7 published novels to 150 novels by 39 Italian writers over 30 years.

Starnone strenuously denies that he is Elena Ferrante. In several interviews he claimed that his wife, himself, and most of the millions of readers of the Neapolitan Novels find these investigations boring, disrespectful and irrelevant.

== Personal life ==
Starnone is married to literary translator Anita Raja. They have one daughter. In May 2024 he was awarded Honorary Citizenship of Saviano where he was born, as part of a Cultural initiative to honour distinguished writers. "Domenico Starnone makes us proud and excited" said the Mayor, Vincenzo Simonelli.

== Selected bibliography ==
- 1987, Ex cattedra, Il Manifesto Rossoscuola Ed.
- 1989, Il salto con le aste, Universale Economica.
- 1990, Denti, Feltrinelli.
- 1990, Segni d'oro, Feltrinellli.
- 1992, Sottobanco, Edizioni e/o.
- 1994, Eccesso di zelo, Feltrinelli.
- 1995, Fuori registro, Feltrinelli.
- 1995, Appunti sulla maleducazione di un insegnante volenteroso, Generico.
- 1996, La retta via, Feltrinelli.
- 1996, Fuori Registro, Feltrinelli.
- 2000, Via Gemito (The House on Via Gemito), Feltrinelli.
- 2001, La collega Passamaglia, Gabriele e Mariateresa Benincasa Ed.
- 2002, Alice allo Strega
- 2005, Labilità
- 2007, Ex cattedra e altre storie di scuola
- 2007, Prima esecuzione
- 2009, Spavento
- 2010, Fare scene. Una storia di cinema
- 2010, Autobiografia erotica di Aristide Gambìa, Einaudi.
- 2014, Lacci (Ties)
- 2016, Scherzetto (Trick)
- 2018, Le false resurrezioni, Einaudi.
- 2019, Confidenza (Trust), Einaudi.
- 2021, Vita mortale e immortale della bambina di Milano (The Mortal and Immortal Life of the Girl from Milan), Einaudi
- 2024, Il Vecchio al Mare, (The Old Man by the Sea), Einaudi.
- 2025, Destinazione errata, Einaudi.

=== English editions ===
- First Execution, translated by Antony Shugaar (2009) ISBN 9781933372662
- Ties, translated by Jhumpa Lahiri (2017) ISBN 9781609453855
- Trick, translated by Jhumpa Lahiri (2018) ISBN 9781609454449
- Trust (also as Secrets), translated by Jhumpa Lahiri (2019) ISBN 9781609457037
- The House on Via Gemito, translated by Oonagh Stransky (2023) ISBN 9781609459239
- The Mortal and Immortal Life of the Girl from Milan, translated by Oonagh Stransky (2024) ISBN 9798889660477
- The Old Man by the Sea, translated by Oonagh Stransky (2025) ISBN 9798889661306
