= Troubling Love =

Troubling Love may refer to:

- Nasty Love, a 1995 Italian thriller film, released in the United States as Troubling Love
- Troubling Love (novel), a 1992 novel by Elena Ferrante
