= Those Who Leave and Those Who Stay =

2013 novel by Elena Ferrante

- First edition cover
- Author: Elena Ferrante
- Original title: Storia di chi fugge e di chi resta
- Translator: Ann Goldstein
- Language: Italian
- Publication date: 2013
- English publication date: 2014
- Pages: 400
- ISBN: 9781609452339
- Preceded by: My Brilliant Friend, The Story of a New Name
- Followed by: The Story of the Lost Child

Those Who Leave and Those Who Stay (Italian: Storia di chi fugge e di chi resta) is a 2013 novel written by Italian author Elena Ferrante, published by Edizioni e/o. It is the third installment of her Neapolitan Novels, preceded by My Brilliant Friend and The Story of a New Name, and succeeded by The Story of the Lost Child. It was translated to English by Ann Goldstein in 2014, with that edition published by Europa Editions.

The novel was adapted by HBO and RaiTV in their series My Brilliant Friend. The content of this novel corresponds to the third season of the show, which aired in February 2022.

== Plot ==
Before her wedding, Elena briefly goes back to Naples. Lila finally confides to her about the bad situation she is enduring in the bologna factory where she works, where she is subject to brutal work and to sexual harassment. Pasquale and Nadia convince Lila to go to a meeting of the Italian Communist Party, where she talks about her working conditions. This causes the people present to write a pamphlet about her boss and to picket the factory, which in turn causes her to be more harassed. At night, however, Lila and Enzo study information technology, believing this will lead to a better life.

Lenù writes an article denouncing the situation of the factory and with Pietro's connections, she manages to have it published in the newspaper L'Unità. This brings her a discrete fame, but she soon goes back to Florence for her marriage with Pietro.

Lenù had planned not to have children right away but discovers too late that Pietro did not agree with that plan. She becomes pregnant on her honeymoon, giving birth to her daughter Adele (Dede), named after Pietro's mother. Two years later she has her second daughter, Elsa. At home with two young girls, Lenù has a hard time writing, and feels trapped and alienated. She manages for a price to write another book, based on her and Lila's childhood in Naples. But after Adele, Pietro's mother and her editor, judges the book to have no merit she abandons the project.

Lenù briefly comes back to Naples to find the city much changed. Lila and Enzo's computer lessons paid off, and they managed to find work for IBM as computer programmers, constructing a better life. They have now been working with Michele Solara, who the neighborhood continues to fear for his Camorra connections. When Lenù is shocked to learn this, and compares it to a betrayal, Lila tells her that Lenù's little sister, Elisa, has been living with Marcello Solara.

In Florence, Lenù runs into Nino again when her husband Pietro brings him home. She discovers she is still attracted to him despite the fact that he abandoned her friend after their love affair. She feels inspired by Nino, who seems to recognize her intellect and blames Pietro for letting her be wasted by a routine with small children. Inspired by this, she writes a feminist text which Adele deems worthy of publication. She and Nino start an affair, which makes Elena realize how unhappy she is in her marriage.

Lenù tells Lila she plans to leave her husband to be with Nino, which horrifies her friend. Nino tells her he can't leave his wife and Lenù decides to leave Pietro with or without him. The book ends when they board a plane together.

== Main characters ==
- Elena Greco (known as Lenuccia or Lenù), the narrator and main character. At the age of twenty-five, she marries Pietro Airota, and they have two young daughters, Adele (Dede) and Elsa. She is quickly disillusioned by the marriage, and which further unravels when she meets again her childhood love, Nino Sarratore.
- Raffaella Cerullo (known as Lila or Lina), Elena's best friend. She starts a relationship with Enzo, and starts working at IBM.
- Pietro Airota, Lenù's husband, and father to Dede and Elsa. A young professor at the university, he believes his career and intellect are superior to his wife's, which she comes to resent. At the end of the novel, she leaves him for Nino Sarratore.
- Giovanni Sarratore (Nino), Lenù's childhood love and Lila's former lover, who comes back to her life when she is living in Florence. He is married with a son, and has at least one child outside of the marriage.
- Enzo Scanno, Lila and Lenù's childhood friend, who starts a relationship with Lila after he helps her leave her abusive marriage.

== Themes and reception ==
It was praised for its portrayal of an intelligent young woman who finds motherhood stifling, a perspective not often portrayed, as argued by Roxana Robinson in The New York Times: "She (Elena) has joined the intelligentsia and is about to marry into the middle class, yet her life is still rife with limitations. Her distinguished husband is narrow-minded and restrictive, and she finds motherhood numbing."

The novel was also praised for its social themes, showing the neighborhood's changes under the Camorra's influence, and the struggles during the 70s Years of Lead in Italy: "During the struggles of the 1970s between the Communists and the Socialists she [Elena] turns to politics, only to find that the Camorra rules here too."

Often presented as the main topic of the series, the theme of female friendship appears also in the third volume, in spite of it being the one where the two main characters spend the most time apart. Lila and Lenù continue to influence each other, since one is always pushing the other: "The book's center is Elena's friendship with Lila, yet this woman-to-woman relationship is always threatened."
