= The Old Man and the Sea (disambiguation) =

The Old Man and the Sea is a short novel by Ernest Hemingway. It may also refer to:

- The Old Man and the Sea (1958 film), directed by John Sturges, starring Spencer Tracy
- The Old Man and the Sea (1990 film), television film starring Anthony Quinn
- The Old Man and the Sea (1999 film), paint-on-glass-animated short film directed by Aleksandr Petrov
- "The Old Man and the Sea", a 2005 episode of the television series Will & Grace season 8
- "The Old Man and the Seat", a 2019 episode of the television series Rick and Morty season 4

== See also ==
- Old Man of the Sea, mythological figure of ancient Greece
- The Old Man by the Sea, a 2024 novel by Domenico Starnone
