= The Days of Abandonment =

2002 novel by Elena Ferrante

- Author: Elena Ferrante
- Original title: I giorni dell'abbandono
- Translator: Ann Goldstein
- Language: Italian
- Publisher: Europa Editions
- Publication date: 2002
- English publication date: 2005
- Pages: 192
- ISBN: 978-1-78770-206-6

The Days of Abandonment (Italian: I giorni dell'abbandono) is a 2002 Italian novel by Elena Ferrante first published in English in 2005, translated by Ann Goldstein and published by Europa Editions. The novel tells the story of an Italian woman living in Turin whose husband abruptly leaves her after fifteen years together.

In 2005, Italian director Roberto Faenza adapted The Days of Abandonment into a film of the same name. In April 2021, HBO Films announced plans to adapt the novel into a film starring Natalie Portman and written and directed by Maggie Betts, but production was shelved shortly afterwards when Portman left the project.

== Plot ==
Olga, a stay at home mother in her late 30s, is told by her husband Mario that he is leaving her and their two children. Initially, Olga believes that Mario is not serious, but she soon realizes he has left her for another woman. The end to the marriage of 15 years creates a profound internal crisis for Olga.

After discovering that the other woman Mario is having an affair with is the daughter of one of his colleagues, whom he met when she was fifteen, Olga begins to have a breakdown. She attacks Mario and his new girlfriend Carla when she meets them in the street. Afterwards, Olga begins a long introspective journey to analyze the years with her husband, to find errors and gaps that could have created his desire to leave. The sad reality soon emerges: Mario is simply in love with another woman.

Olga abandons herself to her sadness, risking losing herself and her life. Her responsibilities multiply against her: there are two children to care for, a house to maintain, and a dog to look after. Ordinary actions, the basic precautions of a mother, begin to alienate her and make it impossible to continue. Her past and her childhood fears return to torment her, together with the idea that a woman without love, without a man, can't survive. She grows vulgar in mind and gesture, as a relief from unbearable pain. Olga tries to seduce a neighbour, but it goes terribly. Though they attempt to have sex, they are eventually forced to give up when he cannot sustain an erection.

One day in August, Olga's son Gianni contracts a fever while her dog begins to be sick. She fears he is poisoned. Her younger daughter, Ilaria, can't understand her emotional state, just annoys her and is whiny. Otto, Olga's dog, starts to show signs of physical suffering from poisoning, like her son. Olga accidentally jams the key in the lock and realizes that she cannot call for help as her phone line is down and her cellphone is broken. Due to the summer holidays the apartment building she lives in is virtually empty. She finds herself completely unable to focus but eventually pulls out of it and, when her downstairs neighbor comes by to check on her, is able to open the door herself.

Olga's son is fine, though her dog dies. Through this situation, she comes to understand that she has the means and strength necessary to control her own life. Helped by her neighbour, Aldo Carrano, Olga resolves each problem and begins that day to fight to restore the pieces of herself, to care again for her son and daughter, and to recreate civil bonds with her now-ex-husband. She eventually rebuilds her life, arranging for joint custody with Mario. Though her friends try to set her up with men, she shies away from them. One of her friends invites her to a concert where she sees her downstairs neighbour playing in the orchestra. Realizing that perhaps she has misjudged him, she contacts him again and the two attempt a relationship.

== Characters ==
- Olga: the protagonist and narrator
- Mario: Olga's husband
- Gianni: the couple's young son
- Ilaria: the couple's young daughter
- Aldo Carrano: Olga and Mario's neighbor, an aging musician
- Carla: Mario's mistress
- Gina: Carla's mother

== Themes ==
=== Self-discipline ===
Elena Ferrante often underlines the mastery of those who own their personality and who search, with all their might, to maintain it, whatever happens.

From the beginning, this desire for self-control clearly appears in Olga, through her attempts to control language, to free herself from her Neapolitan accent, and to even forget aggressive idioms or tones of voice.

=== Mirrors ===
In the novel, mirrors are fundamentally important for Olga. They allow her to perceive herself and help her to fight her internal crises.

Elena Ferrante often represents the experience of a female subject in her novels. The women she writes are characterized by a natural disquiet and uncertainty, and they demonstrate a need for internal discovery and analysis, through the observation of their effect on others—through observing a reflection.

== Editions ==
=== In Italian ===
I Giorni dell'Abbandono. 2002, Edizioni e/o, Roma, ISBN 978-88-6632-641-0.

Republished in Cronache del mal d’amore, a volume that also included Ferrante’s novels Troubling Love and The Lost Daughter. Cronache del mal d'amore. 2012, Edizioni e/o, Roma, ISBN 978-88-6632-192-7.

=== In English ===
The Days of Abandonment, translated to English by Ann Goldstein. Published by Europa Editions originally in 2005. ISBN 978-1-933372-00-6.

Republished with the movie cover under ISBN 978-1-60945-276-6.

== Reception ==
The novel received positive notices upon its release. Prior to the Neapolitan Novels, The Days of Abandonment was Ferrante's most popular book in English. Critic Radhika Joneslena has praised the book, saying: "In novelist Elena Ferrante's hands, being abandoned is not a passive condition. On the contrary, it ushers the heroine of The Days of Abandonment into the most intensely lived weeks of her existence. Left with two children and with little explanation by her husband, Mario, Olga juggles anger, denial, capitulation, and desperation as she seeks to understand her predicament through an exploration of her past-not only her marriage, but the specter of an abandoned woman who haunted her childhood."

According to Janet Maslin, writing for The New York Times: "Both the novel's emotional and carnal candor are potent. Once Olga begins seeing herself as, in Simone de Beauvoir's words, a woman destroyed, she begins a downward spiral that includes hallucination, terror of poison and grim sexual self-abasement with her aging neighbor."

The book was voted by The Guardian as one of the "Top 10 books about cheating". In 2024, it was named by The New York Times as one of the best 100 books of the 21st century.

The novel was also often compared in the press with Domenico Starnone's Ties, published in 2017. The two novels deal with unravelling marriages from different perspectives, and Starnone was often especulated to have been the person or one of the people behind the pseudonym Elena Ferrante, which he has denied. According to The New Yorker: "Starnone coyly pointed out that both Ties and Days of Abandonment contain the precise detail of a glass vessel, which each wife breaks in response to her husband’s faithlessness. This is but one of many conspicuous correspondences and mirror images between the two novels."

== Adaptations ==
In 2005, the novel was adapted into the film I giorni dell'abbandono, directed by Roberto Faenza.

HBO Films announced an English language adaptation of the novel into a film, starring Natalie Portman and written and directed by Maggie Betts, but production was shelved after Portman left the project.
