= In the Margins =

In the Margins may refer to:

- "In the Margins" (song), a 2005 song by Echo & the Bunnymen
- In the Margins: On the Pleasures of Reading and Writing, a 2021 book of essays by Elena Ferrante
- In the Margins Award, an American literary award
