= Elena Ferrante =

Pseudonymous Italian writer

- Occupation: Novelist
- Writing career
- Language: Italian
- Years active: 1992–present
- Genre: Literary fiction
- Notable works: The Days of Abandonment, Neapolitan Novels
- Website: elenaferrante.com

Elena Ferrante (Italian pronunciation: [ˈɛːlena ferˈrante]) is a pseudonymous Italian novelist. Ferrante's books, originally published in Italian, have been translated into many languages. Her four-book series of Neapolitan Novels are her most widely known works. Time magazine called Ferrante one of the 100 most influential people in 2016.

Ferrante has kept her identity secret since her 1992 debut, stating that anonymity is key to her writing process and that "books, once they are written, have no need of their authors". Speculation and several theories as to her true identity, based on information Ferrante has given in interviews as well as analysis drawn from the content of her novels, have been put forth, and routinely denied.

== Biography ==
Ferrante has kept her true identity secret, and very little is known about her. She has stated in interviews that she was born in Naples, the daughter of a seamstress, and that she has three sisters. Her knowledge of classical literature has led critics to argue that she must have studied literature.

== Writing ==
=== Early novels and Frantumaglia ===
The first appearance of her work in English was the publication of a short story, "Delia's Elevator", translated by Adria Frizzi in the anthology After the War (2004). It narrates the movements of the title character on the day of her mother's burial, particularly her return to her safe retreat in the old elevator in the apartment building where she grew up. The story was later expanded into Ferrante's first novel, Troubling Love (in the original version, L'amore molesto), originally published in 1992. The novel follows protagonist Delia when she returns home following the mysterious death of her mother, a poor seamstress, who had been found drowned on an Italian beach wearing nothing but a luxury bra. The novel was a critical success and won the prestigious Premio Procida-Isola di Arturo Elsa Morante.

In 2002, Ferrante published her second novel, The Days of Abandonment (in the original version, I giorni dell'abbandono). The novel tells the story of protagonist Olga, whose life unravels when her husband of 15 years abruptly tells her he is leaving her for a younger woman. Olga becomes haunted by the visions of abandoned women she saw as a child. The novel was also a huge success with Italian and international critics. Critic Janet Maslin, writing for The New York Times, wrote: "Both the novel's emotional and carnal candor are potent. Once Olga begins seeing herself as, in Simone de Beauvoir's words, a woman destroyed, she begins a downward spiral that includes hallucination, terror of poison, and grim sexual self-abasement with her aging neighbor."

In 2003, Ferrante published her first non-fiction book, La Frantumaglia, which was translated into English as Frantumaglia: A Writer's Journey in 2016. The book is a collection of essays and interviews, and it was republished several times to include content on her following novels. In 2006, Ferrante published her third novel, The Lost Daughter (in the original version, La figlia oscura). The novel follows Leda, a woman who is spending her vacations on an Italian beach, and becomes obsessed with a nearby Italian family, especially with a woman and her young daughter. That makes her think of her own time as a young mother, and the existential despair that led her to leave her family for two years. The book was later adapted as a film for Netflix in the directorial debut of Maggie Gyllenhaal. In 2007, she also published her first children's novel, La spiaggia di notte (translated into English by Ann Goldstein as The Beach at Night in 2016). The book tells the story of a doll who is forgotten on the beach at night.

=== The Neapolitan Novels ===
The Neapolitan Novels is a set of four novels published between 2011 and 2015. They tell the life story of two perceptive and intelligent girls, Lila and Lenu, born in Naples in 1944, who try to create lives for themselves within a violent and stultifying culture. The series consists of My Brilliant Friend (2011), The Story of a New Name (2013), Those Who Leave and Those Who Stay (2014), and The Story of the Lost Child (2015), which was nominated for the Strega Prize, the most prestigious Italian literary award, as well as the International Booker Prize. The Story of the Lost Child appeared on The New York Times' 10 Best Books of 2015. In 2019, The Guardian ranked My Brilliant Friend the 11th best book since 2000. In 2024, The New York Times ranked it no. 1 in its list of 100 best books of the 21st century. The overall series was also listed in Vulture as one of the 12 "New Classics" since 2000.

Elissa Schappel, writing for Vanity Fair, reviewed the last book of the quartet as "This is Ferrante at the height of her brilliance." For The New York Review of Books, Roger Cohen wrote: "The interacting qualities of the two women are central to the quartet, which is at once introspective and sweeping, personal and political, covering the more than six decades of the two women's lives and the way those lives intersect with Italy's upheavals, from the revolutionary violence of the leftist Red Brigades to radical feminism." In The Guardian, it was observed the growing popularity of Ferrante, especially among writers: "Partly because her work describes domestic experiences – such as vivid sexual jealousy and other forms of shame – that are underexplored in fiction, Ferrante's reputation is soaring, especially among women (Zadie Smith, Mona Simpson and Jhumpa Lahiri are fans)." Darrin Franich called the novels the series of the decade, saying: "The Neapolitan Novels are the series of the decade because they are so clearly of this decade: conflicted, revisionist, desperate, hopeful, revolutionary, euphorically feminine even in the face of assaultive male corrosion." Judith Shulevitz in The Atlantic praised particularly how the books circle back to their start, to Lila and Lenu's childhood games, in the final installment. Maureen Corregan has also praised the ending of the novels, calling it "Perfect Devastation".

=== Later work ===
Her first novel after finishing the quartet, The Lying Life of Adults, was translated into English by Ann Goldstein and played with the stereotypical teenage-girl-coming-of-age structure, told in the first person by the character of Giovanna Trada. Ferrante's Incidental Inventions, a collection of Ferrante's columns in the English newspaper The Guardian, was published in 2019. It was also published in Italian as L'invenzione occasionale. In 2022, her In the Margins: On the Pleasures of Reading and Writing (in the original version I margini e il dettato) was published. It is based on a series of lectures she wrote for the 2021 Umberto Eco lecture series, sponsored by the University of Bologna. The text was read by the Italian actress Manuela Mandracchia in the Arena del Sole in Bologna from 17 to 19 November and streamed live.

== Anonymity ==
Despite being recognized as a novelist on an international scale, Ferrante has kept her identity secret since the 1992 publication of her first novel. Speculation as to her true identity has been rife, and several theories, based on information Ferrante has given in interviews as well as analysis drawn from the content of her novels, have been put forward. Ferrante holds that "books, once they are written, have no need of their authors". She told The Paris Review that her initial reason was shyness, saying: "I was frightened at the thought of having to come out of my shell". She also repeatedly argued that anonymity is a precondition for her work, and that keeping her true name out of the spotlight is key to her writing process. According to Ferrante, "Once I knew that the completed book would make its way in the world without me, once I knew that nothing of the concrete, physical me would ever appear beside the volume—as if the book were a little dog and I were its master—it made me see something new about writing. I felt as though I had released the words from myself."

In 2003, Ferrante published Frantumaglia: A Writer's Journey, a volume of letters, essays, reflections and interviews, which sheds some light on her background. It was the first scholarly monograph on Elena Ferrante, a detailed self-study of her poetics drawing on Western literary and philosophical texts while also constructing its own theoretical framework. The 2003 original edition was followed by two expanded versions, in 2007 and in 2015. The 2015 volume was the first one to be published in English in 2016. In a 2013 article for The New Yorker, critic James Wood summarized what is generally accepted about Ferrante, based in part on letters collected in that volume, saying that "a number of her letters have been collected and published. From them, we learn that she grew up in Naples, and has lived for periods outside Italy. She has a classics degree; she has referred to being a mother. One could also infer from her fiction and from her interviews that she is not now married ... In addition to writing, 'I study, I translate, I teach.'"

In March 2016, Marco Santagata, an Italian novelist and philologist, a scholar of Petrarch and Dante, and a professor at the University of Pisa, published a paper detailing his theory of Ferrante's identity. Santagata's paper drew on philological analysis of Ferrante's writing, close study of the details about the cityscape of Pisa described in the novel, and the fact that the author reveals an expert knowledge of modern Italian politics. Based on this information, he concluded that the author had lived in Pisa but left by 1966, and therefore identified the probable author as Neapolitan professor Marcella Marmo, who studied in Pisa from 1964 to 1966. Both Marmo and the publisher deny Santagata's identification.

In her September 15th, 2018 article for The Guardian entitled "Interviews" she admits to having never given an in-person interview. "Against the face-to-face encounter," she admits, "I have preferred—because of my own limitations—a written correspondence."

=== Purported identification as Anita Raja ===
In October 2016, investigative reporter Claudio Gatti published an article jointly in Il Sole 24 Ore, Frankfurter Allgemeine Zeitung and The New York Review of Books that relied on financial records related to real estate transactions and royalties payments to draw the conclusion that Anita Raja, a Rome-based translator, is the real author behind the Ferrante pseudonym. Gatti's article was criticized by many in the literary world as a violation of privacy, although Gatti contends that "by announcing that she would lie on occasion, Ferrante has in a way relinquished her right to disappear behind her books and let them live and grow while their author remained unknown. Indeed, she and her publisher seemed to have fed public interest in her true identity."

The writer Jeanette Winterson, in an article for The Guardian, denounced Gatti's investigations as malicious and sexist, saying: "At the bottom of this so-called investigation into Ferrante's identity is an obsessional outrage at the success of a writer – female – who decided to write, publish and promote her books on her own terms." Others have compared the unwanted publishing of her personal information to doxxing, and to a violation of privacy, something heightened by the violent language used by Gatti, who said she wanted it to happen. An article in Jezebel suggested that this was part of a general tendency to use scandal to eclipse the brilliance of women artists. Others responding to Gatti's article suggested that knowledge of Ferrante's biography is relevant.

In December 2016, Tommaso Debenedetti, a controversial Italian prankster, published on the website of the Spanish daily El Mundo a purported interview with Raja confirming she was Elena Ferrante. This was quickly denied by Ferrante's publisher, who called the interview a fake.

In September 2017, a team of scholars, computer scientists, philologists and linguists at the University of Padua analyzed 150 novels written in Italian by 40 different authors, including seven books by Ferrante but none by Raja. Based on analysis using several authorship attribution models, they concluded that Raja's husband, author and journalist Domenico Starnone, is the probable author of the Ferrante novels. Raja has worked for E/O Publishing as copy editor and has been editing Starnone's books for years.

Starnone strenuously denies that he is Elena Ferrante. Ferrante has repeatedly dismissed suggestions that she is actually a man, telling Vanity Fair in 2015 that questions about her gender are rooted in a presumed "weakness" of female writers.

== Works ==
- L'amore molesto (1992; English translation: Troubling Love, 2006);
- I giorni dell'abbandono (2002; English translation: The Days of Abandonment, 2005)
- La Frantumaglia: Carte 1991–2003. The book was later republished in extended versions:
  - Ferrante, Elena. La Frantumaglia: Carte 1991–2003: Tessere 2003–2007. E/O, 2007.
  - Ferrante, Elena. La Frantumaglia: Carte 1991–2003: Tessere 2003–2007: Lettere 2011–2016. E/O, 2015. (2003; English translation Frantumaglia: A Writer's Journey, 2016)
- La figlia oscura (2006; English translation: The Lost Daughter, 2008)
- La spiaggia di notte (2007; English translation: The Beach at Night, 2016)
- The Neapolitan novels:
  - L'amica geniale (2011; English translation: My Brilliant Friend, 2012). OCLC 778419313.
  - Storia del nuovo cognome, L'amica geniale volume 2 (2012; English translation: The Story of a New Name, 2013). OCLC 829451619.
  - Storia di chi fugge e di chi resta, L'amica geniale volume 3 (2013; English translation: Those Who Leave and Those Who Stay, 2014). OCLC 870919836.
  - Storia della bambina perduta, L'amica geniale volume 4 (2014; English translation: The Story of the Lost Child, 2015). OCLC 910239891.
- L'invenzione occasionale (2019; English translation: Incidental Inventions, 2019). OCLC 1102387847.
- La vita bugiarda degli adulti (2019; English translation, The Lying Life of Adults, 2020). OCLC 1126993616
- I margini e il dettato (2021; English translation, In the Margins: On the Pleasures of Reading and Writing, 2022).

== Adaptations ==
Several of Ferrante's novels have been turned into films and series. Troubling Love (L'amore molesto) became the feature film Nasty Love directed by Mario Martone, while The Days of Abandonment (I giorni dell'abbandono) became a film of the same title directed by Roberto Faenza. The Lost Daughter, the 2021 directorial debut film of Maggie Gyllenhaal, starring Olivia Colman, Dakota Johnson and Jessie Buckley, is based on the novel of the same name. In 2016, it was reported that a 32-part television series inspired by the Neapolitan Novels was in the works, co-produced by the Italian producer Wildside for Fandango Productions, with screenwriting led by the writer Francesco Piccolo. In September 2018, the first two episodes of the renamed My Brilliant Friend, an Italian and Neapolitan-language miniseries co-produced by American premium cable network HBO and Italian networks RAI and TIMvision, were aired at the Venice Film Festival. HBO started airing the complete eight-episode miniseries, focusing on the first book in The Neapolitan Novels, in November 2018. The second series of eight episodes was aired in 2020. Season three, also consisting of eight episodes, showed on Rai and HBO in early 2022. On 12 May 2020, Netflix announced a drama series based on The Lying Life of Adults. The series of the same name was released by Netflix in January 2023.

=== Film adaptations ===
Year	Movie name	Based on	Directed By
1995	Nasty Love	Troubling Love	Mario Martone
2005	The Days of Abandonment	The Days of Abandonment	Roberto Faenza
2021	The Lost Daughter	The Lost Daughter	Maggie Gyllenhaal

=== TV shows ===
Year	Name	Based on	Created By
2018–2024	My Brilliant Friend	Neapolitan Novels	Saverio Costanzo
2023	The Lying Life of Adults	The Lying Life of Adults	Edoardo De Angelis

== Awards and honours ==
- 2016 Time 100 Most Influential People.
- 2016 Man Booker International Prize, shortlisted for The Story of the Lost Child.
- 2016 Independent Publisher Book Award - Gold Medal (literary fiction), for The Story of the Lost Child.
- 2014 Best Translated Book Award, shortlisted for The Story of a New Name, translated from the Italian by Ann Goldstein.
