= Frantumaglia =

Non-fiction book by Elena Ferrante

- Author: Elena Ferrante
- Original title: La Frantumaglia
- Translator: Ann Goldstein
- Publication date: 2003
- English publication date: 2016
- Pages: 400
- ISBN: 9781609452926

Frantumaglia is a non-fiction book written by Italian author Elena Ferrante. The book reflects on her writing process over 20 years and has been republished to reflect her experiences writing the Neapolitan Novels.

== Content ==
Frantumaglia contains 20 years of letters to her publishers, interviews and essays written by Italian writer Elena Ferrante. In them, she opens up about her choice to be anonymous, claiming that "books, once written, have no use for an author", about her writing process, and about her influences.

The title of the book is derived from an expression used by Ferrante's mother, which means a “jumble of fragments,” that jumped around and destroyed her, and was used to express “a malaise that could not be defined otherwise and that hinted at a crowded, heterogeneous mix of things in her head, like rubbles floating on a brain’s muddy waters”. As the critic has put it "Ferrante keeps coming back to the idea that we are all “fickle agglomerations” of bits and pieces."

The book became especially popular for the possibility of knowing more about the mysterious writer, who uses only a pseudonym and who has never revealed her identity, in spite of decades of speculation. Ferrante writes a lot about how the writing process is different for women, naming the writers who have inspired her: Elsa Morante, Madame de Lafayette, Alice Munro, Clarice Lispector, Shulamith Firestone, and Luce Irigaray, among others.

The book was originally published after the two first novels written by Ferrante, 1991's Troubling Love and 2002's The Days of Abandonment. The book was later expanded to include interviews relating to 2006's The Lost Daughter, and the Neapolitan Series, written between 2011 and 2016.

== Reception ==
The book was well received by the critic, which praised Ferrante's ability to guide the reader through her writing process. Victor Zarour Zarzar has claimed that "Frantumaglia might well be her most fascinating text: it is both fiction incarnate and a work of self-exegesis."

They have also praised how Ferrante can expose the mechanism behind her beloved characters: "Heroines who observe themselves vigilantly, though at times they break down and can’t; mothers; daughters and their troublesome porous, ever changing bodies; children; female friends and the vagaries of love – these are Ferrante’s most compelling subjects."

== Bibliography ==
The book was originally published in Italian in 2003, and that original edition was followed by two expanded versions, in 2007 and in 2015. The 2015 volume was the first one to be published in English in 2016.

- Ferrante, Elena, La Frantumaglia: Carte 1991-2003. E/O, 2003.
- Ferrante, Elena. La Frantumaglia: Carte 1991-2003: Tessere 2003-2007. E/O, 2007.
- Ferrante, Elena. La Frantumaglia: Carte 1991-2003: Tessere 2003-2007: Lettere 2011-2016. E/O, 2015.
  - In English: Ferrante, Elena: Frantumaglia: A Writer's Journey. Translated by Ann Goldstein. Europa Editions, 2016.
