= Incidental Inventions =

2019 non-fiction book by Elena Ferrante

- Author: Elena Ferrante
- Original title: L'invenzione occasionale
- Translator: Ann Goldstein
- Illustrator: Andrea Ucini
- Language: Italian
- Publisher: Europa Editions
- Publication date: 2019
- Pages: 112
- ISBN: 9781609455590

Incidental Inventions (Italian: L'invenzione occasionale) is a non-fiction book published by writer Elena Ferrante in 2019. The book contains the columns published by the author in English newspaper The Guardian and translated by Ann Goldstein.

== Content ==
In 2017, Elena Ferrante was invited to keep a weekly column in The Guardian. Her writings were published every Sunday between January 20, 2018, and January 12, 2019, translated by Ann Goldstein. They were accompanied by illustration by artist Andrea Ucini.

The Guardian editors had suggested topics for the weekly columns, producing varied content. As a result, the columns work as standalones. One of the most common themes in the series was Ferrante's writing process. In Keeping a Diary, the writer commented on her early attempt to write:

"Why was I worried? Because if, in everyday life, I was so embrrassed, so cautious, that I scarcely breathed, the diary produced in me a craving for truth. I thought that when one writes, it makes no sense to be contained, to censor oneself, and as a result I wrote mostly – maybe only – about what I would have preferred to be silent about, resorting among other things to a vocabulary that I would never have dared to use in speaking."

In another, she mentioned the at the time still unreleased adaptation of her novel The Lost Daughter, which was being turned into a film of the same name by Maggie Gyllenhall, claiming that she would never tell a woman director to follow her text closely, and encouraging her instead to tell her own story "It's her story to tell now".

Questions of feminism and art produced by women are frequent in the text, with Ferrante speaking about her often quoted theme of female friendship, the male gaze in sexuality, the difficulty for women of becoming themselves in a world made for men, the politics of rewriting gendered stories, and how women's literature is still perceived as second-rate.

In another column, she discussed the politics of her country, in a rare change of topic, to speak against Matteo Salvini's Lega Nord. She claims that the party represents a true danger to democracy due to its racist rhetoric, and she claims that Salvini "has become increasingly persuasive, giving the appearance of a good-natured common man who thoroughly understands the problems of the common people and at the right moment bangs his xenophobic and racist fists on the table."

== Reception ==
The book was lauded by critics as an opportunity to see another side of Ferrante, who was trying her hand in short non-fiction for the first time. The columns were seen as uneven, with some raising more attention than others.

Cassandra Luca, writing for the Crimson, noticed: "This essay collection is subtle. Ferrante's writing is akin to a whisper from one friend to another: It utters the truth one would rather not hear, but says it compactly and devastatingly." Stiliana Milkova has added: "Like Frantumaglia, Incidental Inventions provides insight into the writer's world and partakes in the construction of her authorial identity".
