= The Days of Abandonment (film) =

2005 film

- Italian: I giorni dell'abbandono
- Directed by: Roberto Faenza
- Based on: The Days of Abandonment by Elena Ferrante
- Starring: Margherita Buy; Luca Zingaretti
- Cinematography: Maurizio Calvesi
- Music by: Goran Bregović; Carmen Consoli
- Release date: 2005
- Running time: 96 minutes
- Country: Italy
- Language: Italian

The Days of Abandonment (Italian: I giorni dell'abbandono) is a film of 2005 by Roberto Faenza, set in Turin, based on the novel The Days of Abandonment by Elena Ferrante.

== Synopsis ==
Olga (Buy), literary translator, wife and mother of two is suddenly abandoned by her husband (Zingaretti) for a younger woman. With this she enters into a painful lapse that turns into despair that brings her to sleep and food deprivation. She encounters a neighbour musician (Goran Bregović) that moves something in her. After a descent into hell and eventual rise from despair, Olga lives an insight that makes her realize that she was not losing her mind for the lost love but discovers the meaning of losing her dignity and being imprisoned in a single role, which she must break in order to enjoy life.

== Cast ==
- Margherita Buy: Olga
- Luca Zingaretti: Mario
- Goran Bregovic: Damian
- Alessia Goria: Mendicante
- Gea Lionello: Lea
- Gaia Bermani Amaral: Carla
- Sara Santostasi: Ilaria
- Simone Della Croce: Gianni

== Awards ==
The film has received five nominations for several awards:

- David di Donatello 2006 (Best music and best original composer)
- Sindacato Nazionale Giornalisti Cinematografici Italiani 2006 (Best Actor in a Main role and Best Actress in a main role)
- Venice Film Festival 2005 (Best directing)
