= Troubling Love (novel) =

1992 novel by Elena Ferrante

- Editor: Europa Editions
- Author: Elena Ferrante
- Original title: L'Amore Molesto
- Translator: Ann Goldstein
- Publication date: 1992
- English publication date: 2016
- ISBN: 9781933372167

Troubling Love (Italian: L'amore molesto) is the first novel published by Italian writer Elena Ferrante. It was originally published in 1992, but only translated to English, by Ann Goldstein, in 2006, following the critical success of Ferrante's following novel, The Days of Abandonment.

The book was nominated for the prestigious Strega Prize, and won the Procida-Isola di Arturo-Elsa Morante Prize.

The book was adapted to the cinema in 1995, becoming the feature film Nasty Love, directed by Mario Martone.

== Plot ==
Delia goes back to Naples, her native city, when her mother dies in strange circumstances. There, she rediscovers hidden corners of her personality and comes to understand her relationship to her mother. The story is entirely narrated in the first person by the protagonist, forced to return to the places of her childhood and to collide again with a reality she had escaped.

Delia's mother, Amalia, was a poor seamstress who had been found dead at a beach, presumed drowned, wearing only a luxury bra. Delia can not understand how her mother ended there, and she tries to reconstruct her mother's life step by step.

Soon Delia decides to devote herself to the analysis of the male figures present in Amalia's life: her brother (and Delia's uncle) Filippo, a now elderly and weak man, with an expansive and outgoing character; her husband (and Delia's father) from whom Amalia had run away more than twenty years earlier, a dull, violent and extremely jealous man; finally Nicola Polledro, known as Caserta, the charming old man who, in the last period, the widow De Riso (a neighbor) used to see coming and going from Amalia's house.

While mourning her mother, Delia spends time with her uncle Filippo, whose fragmented recollections help her piece together the domestic abuse and restrictions Amalia experienced. This prompts Delia to investigate her mother's past further, uncovering a complex personal history.

To find out more she decides to look for Caserta, who seems to want to play with her through confused signals, chases and sudden appearances. To get to him, the protagonist decides to track down Antonio Polledro, her childhood friend and Caserta's son, with whom she experiences a brief sexual episode aimed at increasingly obsessively embodying the figure of Amalia and her probable love for Caserta.

With the help of Filippo, Delia remembers that she told her father of Amalia's possible affair with Caserta, and comes to understand that she, at age five, had been confused by seeing the two adults and having been harassed herself by Caserta's father. This connects to her complex feelings for her mother, of fear, jealousy, curiosity and sexual revulsion.

This and many others are the little secrets that emerge from the fierce introspective analysis that Delia undergoes during the story and, thanks to this, it becomes possible for her to accept her faults and elaborate once and for all the love-hate that kept her tied to her mother. She concludes by stating that, in fact, "I was Amalia".

== Main characters ==
- Delia: the main character and narrator
- Amalia: Delia's mother, found dead at the beach in the beginning of the novel
- Filippo: Amali'a brother, who helps Delia find the truth of her life
- Nicola Polledro (known as Caserta): a man involved in Amalia's past
- Antonio Polledro: Caserta's son, Delia's childhood friend
- Delia's father: Amalia's abusive husband
- De Riso: Amalia's neighbor

== Themes ==
=== Relations between women ===
The novel starts a trend by which Ferrante is known, of portraying women trapped in difficult lives or situations at the limit of sustainability and endurance. This process is repeated in most of Ferrante's works and stories. The author, in fact, in her novels, presents women of similar origins and characteristics, intertwining their lives with the history of the city of Naples, with episodes of violence embedded in their memories, with a harsh language of which many try to break free.

Each female protagonist conceived by Elena Ferrante is forced to confront her own past and present, following a long path of change and rebirth, made possible by strong self-discipline. It is precisely this self-control that leads to the conclusion of the events, in which the main characters arrive at full awareness of themselves and the realization of the ability to face the turmoil of their lives.

=== Psychological break ===
A theme that Elena Ferrante studies carefully is that of psychological collapse In particular, what most captures the author's attention is the inner struggle that characterizes the human mind in its attempt to defend itself from the loss of all certainty and to remain firmly attached to reality. Ferrante defines this type of struggle as "battles with death", implying the death of the soul and of female psychological freedom.

The name of the novel comes from a Freudian term, as Ferrante herself has pointed out on her collection of essays Frantumaglia. In his essay "On Female Sexuality", Freud says that for little children the father is "only a troublesome rival" to the child's affection for their mother (In the Italian translation, "un rivale molesto.")

== Reception ==
The book was well received by the critics, who praised its psychological insight into a mother / daughter relationship. The book won the Procida-Isola di Arturo-Elsa Morante Prize, and was nominated for the Strega Prize.

David Lipsky, writing for The New York Times, said "Halfway through my second reading of Elena Ferrante's "Troubling Love" — 70 more pages to go in seamy Naples — I tore the book down the middle. It's the first time a novel ever made me get physical, and it was the first good mood I'd been in for weeks." he praised the book's mysterious theme "'I had forgotten nothing,' she explains, gathering evidence, 'but I didn't want to remember'.", and "Ferrante is fascinated by the moments when a personality — like a wire stretched too far from its power source — shorts and corrodes."

For Tiziana de Rogatis, a main theme was the main character's relationship with her mother: "'Amalia had been. I was Amalia'. The last words of Troubling Love acknowledge the magical presence of the mother. With this heartbreaking climax, Ferrante modifies the scope of the family novel, placing at its epicenter a story about mothers that turns mysterious and disquieting."

== Bibliography ==
=== In Italian ===
- L'Amore Molesto, 1992, Edizioni e/o, Roma, ISBN 978-88-66326403.
- Republished as Cronache del mal d'amore, in a volume that included also the novels The Days of Abandonment and The Lost Daughter. Cronache del mal d'amore. 2012, Edizioni e/o, Roma, ISBN 978-88-6632-192-7.

=== In English ===
- Troubling love, translated by Ann Goldstein. 2016, Europa Editions, ISBN 978-1933372167.

== Film adaptation ==
The book was adapted into the Italian film of the same name, released in the UK as Nasty Love and in the United States as Troubling love.

L'Amore Molesto won 3 David di Donatello Awards for Best Actress, Best Director and Best Supporting Actress and was nominated for 2 for Best Film and Best Producer. It was also nominated for a Palme d'Or by the Cannes Film Festival for director Mario Martone.
