= The Lying Life of Adults (TV series) =

Italian television series

- English poster
- Italian: La vita bugiarda degli adulti
- Genre: Drama; Coming-of-age
- Created by: Edoardo De Angelis
- Based on: The Lying Life of Adults by Elena Ferrante
- Written by: Elena Ferrante; Laura Paolucci; Francesco Piccolo; Edoardo De Angelis
- Directed by: Edoardo De Angelis
- Starring: Giordana Marengo; Alessandro Preziosi; Pina Turco; Raffaella Rea; Biagio Forestieri; Valeria Golino
- Narrated by: Giordana Marengo
- Composer: Enzo Avitabile
- Country of origin: Italy
- Original languages: Neapolitan; Italian
- No. of seasons: 1
- No. of episodes: 6

Production
- Executive producer: Ivan Fiorini
- Producers: Domenico Procacci; Laura Paolucci
- Cinematography: Ferran Paredes Rubio
- Editors: Lorenzo Peluso; Chiara Griziotti
- Production company: Fandango

Original release
- Network: Netflix
- Release: 4 January 2023

The Lying Life of Adults (Italian: La vita bugiarda degli adulti) is an Italian and Neapolitan-language coming-of-age drama television series created by Edoardo De Angelis, based on the 2019 novel of the same name by Elena Ferrante. It was released internationally by Netflix on 4 January 2023.

== Plot ==
Giovanna Trada is a 15-year-old girl born to a well-to-do family in Naples. As she makes the transition from childhood to adolescence, however, she struggles to find an identity among the bourgeoisie world of her parents, especially as she begins to bear a striking resemblance to her Aunt Vittoria, who has been ostracized from the family for years. Despite her parents' wishes, Giovanna convinces her father to let her visit Vittoria, who lives in a rough part of the city. Giovanna's relationship with Vittoria soon opens her eyes to unspeakable secrets about her family and their past.

== Cast ==
- Giordana Marengo as Giovanna
- Alessandro Preziosi as Andrea
- Pina Turco as Nella
- Raffaella Rea as Costanza
- Biagio Forestieri as Mariano
- Valeria Golino as Vittoria
- Rossella Gamba as Angela
- Azzurra Mennella as Ida
- Susy Del Giudice as Margherita
- Giuseppe Brunetti as Corrado
- Maria Vera Ratti as Giuliana
- Gianluca Spagnoli as Tonino
- Adriano Pantaleo as Rosario
- Giovanni Buselli as Roberto

== Episodes ==
No. overall	No. in season	Title	Directed by	Written by	Original release date
1	1	"Beauty" (Bellezza)	Edoardo De Angelis	Elena Ferrante, Laura Paolucci, Francesco Piccolo & Edoardo De Angelis	4 January 2023
2	2	"Resemblance" (Somiglianza)	Edoardo De Angelis	Elena Ferrante, Laura Paolucci, Francesco Piccolo & Edoardo De Angelis	4 January 2023
3	3	"Bitterness" (Amarezza)	Edoardo De Angelis	Elena Ferrante, Laura Paolucci, Francesco Piccolo & Edoardo De Angelis	4 January 2023
4	4	"Loneliness" (Solitudine)	Edoardo De Angelis	Elena Ferrante, Laura Paolucci, Francesco Piccolo & Edoardo De Angelis	4 January 2023
5	5	"Love" (Amore)	Edoardo De Angelis	Elena Ferrante, Laura Paolucci, Francesco Piccolo & Edoardo De Angelis	4 January 2023
6	6	"Truth" (Verità)	Edoardo De Angelis	Elena Ferrante, Laura Paolucci, Francesco Piccolo & Edoardo De Angelis	4 January 2023

== Reception ==
=== Critical response ===
On the review aggregator website Rotten Tomatoes, 100% of 14 critics' reviews are positive, with an average rating of 7.8/10. The website's consensus reads: "Adapted with the same patient rhythms as Elena Ferrante's novel, The Lying Life of Adults is a coming of age epic with genuine wisdom and sweep." According to Metacritic, which assigned a weighted average score of 79 out of 100 based on 7 critics, the series received "generally favorable" reviews. Rebecca Nicholson of The Guardian wrote, "When I read The Lying Life of Adults, I thought of it as a very internal and inward-looking story, but this version breathes new life into it, turns it outwards, and adds a touch of rocket fuel."

=== Awards and nominations ===
Year	Award	Category	Recipient(s)	Result	Ref.
2023	Nastri d'Argento Grandi Serie	Best Series	The Lying Life of Adults	Nominated	
2023	Nastri d'Argento Grandi Serie	Best Actress	Giordana Marengo	Nominated	
2023	Nastri d'Argento Grandi Serie	Best Actress	Valeria Golino	Nominated	
2023	Nastri d'Argento Grandi Serie	Best Supporting Actor	Alessandro Preziosi	Nominated	
2023	Nastri d'Argento Grandi Serie	Best Supporting Actress	Pina Turco	Nominated	
