= The Beach at Night =

Children's novel written by Elena Ferrante in 2007

- Editor: Edizioni e/o
- Author: Elena Ferrante
- Audio read by: Natalie Portman
- Original title: La Spiaggia di Notte
- Translator: Ann Goldstein
- Illustrator: Mara Cerri
- Genres: Children's literature
- Publication date: 2007
- English publication date: 2016
- Pages: 48
- ISBN: 9781609453701

The Beach at Night (Italian: La spiaggia di notte) is a children's novel written by Italian writer Elena Ferrante.

== Plot ==
Doll Celine is forgotten at the beach and has to fend for herself at night. The Mean Beach Attendant of Sunset attempts to steal all her words, the Fire tries to burn her, and the Sea refuses to answer her prayers. Above all, she is sad to have been left behind by her mamma, the little girl Mati, who forgot her when she got a new kitten. She has an eventful evening, but when the sun rises, Celine will finally be able to see everything a little more clearly.

== Reception ==
The novel was well received by critics, who praised its dark tone. According to Alex O’Connell, writing for The Times, it has a "complex girl-doll heroine", In the Sydney Morning Herald, the novel was called an "unnerving little gem."

According to The New York Times, the short novel follows a European tradition of dark fairy tales being present to young children, and the book had been classified by its US publisher as an adult book. They also argue that the translation of the book includes an expletive, instead of a more child-appropriate word found in the original. Nora Krug, writing for the Washington Post, notices that the book deals with difficult topics: abandonment, jealousy, death by drowning and fire, but also that "Celina's tale is powerfully told and complex".

== Bibliography ==
=== In Italian ===
- La Spiaggia di Notte. Illustrazioni di Mara Cerri. 2007, Edizioni E/O.

=== In English ===
- The Beach at Night. 2007, Europa Editions. Translated by Ann Goldstein, Illustrated by Mara Cerri. ISBN 9781609453701.
