= Alessandro Preziosi =

Italian actor

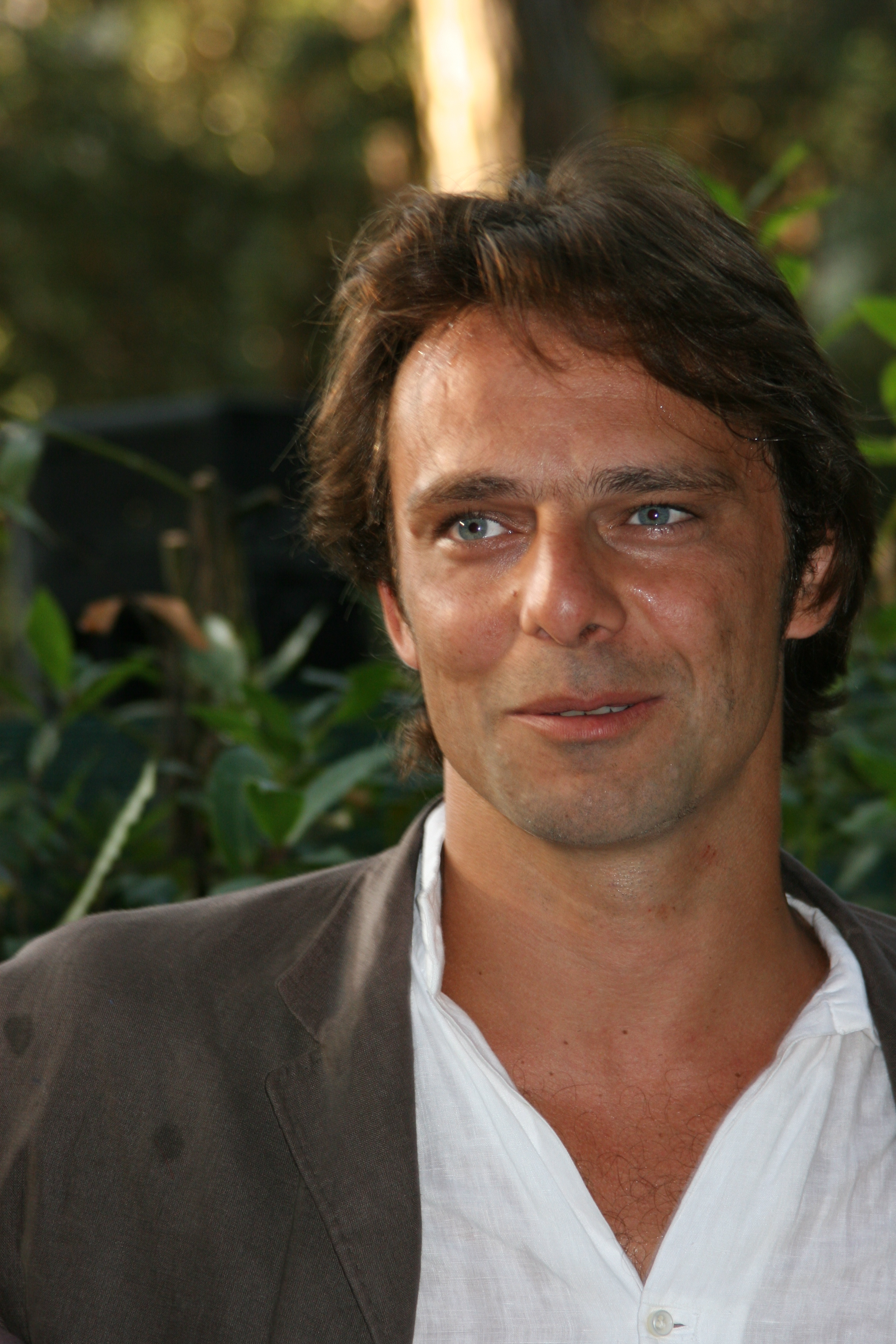
- Alessandro Preziosi on 17 July 2009.
- Born: 19 April 1973 (age 53); Naples, Campania, Italy
- Occupations: Film actor; television actor
- Years active: 1995–present
- Children: 2
- Website: alessandropreziosi.it (in Italian)

Alessandro Preziosi (born 19 April 1973) is an Italian actor.

== Filmography ==
=== Films ===
| Year | Title | Role | Notes |
|---|---|---|---|
| 2004 | Vanilla and Chocolate | Andrea | |
| 2007 | The Lark Farm | Egon | |
| 2007 | I Viceré | Consalvo | |
| 2008 | L'alchimia del gusto | Giovanni | Short film |
| 2008 | Blood of the Losers | Ettore Dogliani | |
| 2010 | Loose Cannons | Antonio Cantone | |
| 2010 | Men vs. Women | Diego | |
| 2011 | Women vs. Men | Diego | |
| 2012 | Il volto di un'altra | René | |
| 2013 | A Liberal Passion | Giulio Faleni | |
| 2014 | Amazzonia 3D | Narrator | Italian voice-over |
| 2014 | Portate 'o pigiama | Police officer | Short film |
| 2015 | #Romeo | Romeo | Short film |
| 2016 | L'amore rubato | Marina's husband | |
| 2017 | Lost in Florence | Paolo | |
| 2017 | Classe Z | Principal Frigotto | |
| 2018 | Nessuno come noi | Umberto Fioravanti | |
| 2020 | La legge del terremoto | None | Director |
| 2021 | My Brother, My Sister | Nick | |
| 2022 | Bla Bla Baby | Luca | |
| 2022 | La cura | Tarrou | |

=== Television ===
| Year | Title | Role | Notes |
|---|---|---|---|
| 1996 | Man O Man | Various | Variety/comedy/game show (season 2) |
| 1999 | Una donna per amico | Marcello | Episode: "Madre per davvero" |
| 1999–2002 | Vivere | Pietro Foschi | Series regular |
| 2003–2005 | Elisa di Rivombrosa | Fabrizio Ristori di Rivombrosa | Main role (season 1); guest (season 2); 12 episodes |
| 2005–2007 | Il capitano | Captain Giulio Traversari | Lead role; 14 episodes |
| 2006 | L'uomo che rubò la Gioconda | Vincenzo Peruggia | Television film |
| 2008 | Inspector De Luca | Inspector Achille De Luca | Miniseries |
| 2010 | Restless Heart: The Confessions of Saint Augustine | Augustine of Hippo | Miniseries |
| 2011 | Edda Ciano e il comunista | Leonida Bongiorno | Television film |
| 2011 | Un amore e una vendetta | Lorenzo Bermann / Andrea Damonte | Lead role; 8 episodes |
| 2014 | The Homecoming | Paolo Sanseviero | Television film |
| 2014 | Gli anni spezzati | Mario Sossi | Episode: "Il giudice" |
| 2014 | Per amore del mio popolo | Father Giuseppe Diana | Television film |
| 2014 | La Bella e la Bestia | Prince Leon DalVille / The Beast | Miniseries |
| 2016 | Tango per la libertà | Marco Ferreri | Miniseries |
| 2016 | Medici | Filippo Brunelleschi | Recurring role; 4 episodes |
| 2017 | Sotto copertura | Michele Zagaria | Lead role (season 2); 8 episodes |
| 2019 | Liberi di scegliere | Marco Lo Bianco | Television film |
| 2019 | Non mentire | Andrea Molinari | Miniseries |
| 2021 | Masantonio - Sezione scomparsi | Elio Masantonio | Lead role; 10 episodes |
| 2023 | The Lying Life of Adults | Andrea | |
| 2023–2025 | Black Out | Giovanni Lo Bianco | Lead role; 16 episodes |
| 2025 | Leopardi - Il poeta dell'infinito | Don Carmine | Miniseries |
| 2025 | Sandokan | Yanez de Gomera | Lead role; 8 episodes |

== Awards and nominations ==
| Year | Award | Category | Work | Result | Ref. |
|---|---|---|---|---|---|
| 2023 | Nastri d'Argento Grandi Serie | Best Supporting Actor | The Lying Life of Adults | Nominated | |

== Personal life ==
Preziosi and his former partner, Vittoria Puccini, have a daughter together.
