= The Story of a New Name =

2012 novel by Elena Ferrante

- First edition cover
- Author: Elena Ferrante
- Original title: Storia del nuovo cognome
- Translator: Ann Goldstein
- Language: Italian
- Publisher: Europa Editions
- Publication date: 2012
- English publication date: 2013
- Pages: 480
- ISBN: 9781609451349
- Preceded by: My Brilliant Friend
- Followed by: Those Who Leave and Those Who Stay, The Story of the Lost Child

The Story of a New Name (Italian: Storia del nuovo cognome) is a 2012 novel written by Italian author Elena Ferrante. It is the second volume in her four-book series known as the Neapolitan Novels, being preceded by My Brilliant Friend, and succeeded by Those Who Leave and Those Who Stay and The Story of the Lost Child. It was translated to English by Ann Goldstein in 2013.

It was adapted by HBO into the second season of TV show My Brilliant Friend.

== Plot ==
The novel starts with the return of Lila and Stefano from their honeymoon on the Amalfi coast. Lila has a bruised face, and tells Lenù that she was beaten and sexually assaulted when she tried to resist Stefano on their vacation. To their horror, they realize that most of the neighborhood respects Stefano more after this, having considered Lila too unruly for a young girl.

Lila starts to work in the shoe shop her family is opening with the Solara brothers. She becomes pregnant, but has a miscarriage. Both Lila's and Stefano's families pressure her into becoming pregnant again, blaming Lila's independence for the miscarriage. A doctor recommends that she spends a season at sea to increase her fertility, and Lila, desperate to not be alone with her mother and sister-in-law, talks Elena into coming with her. Elena, who is secretly in love with Nino Sarratore, agrees on the condition that they go to the island of Ischia, knowing Nino will be there. Lila, Lenù, Nino, Lila's pregnant sister-in-law Pinuccia and Nino's friend Bruno Soccavo spend the days discussing literature and politics. Pinuccia develops a crush on Bruno, while Nino and Lila fall in love and begin an affair. When they spend the night together, Lenù, depressed and alone at the beach, gives in to the advances of Donato Sarratore, Nino's father, who harassed her a few years before, and with whom she has sex.

As the vacation comes to an end, Lenù, feeling rejected, focuses on her studies and meets less and less with Lila and Nino. When she is taking the Matura, the national exam to finish high school in Italy, one of the examiners tells her about the Scuola Normale di Pisa, where she can continue her education without any fees through a scholarship. Lenù decides to take an exam for the university, and wins a place there. Just before leaving, she goes to say good bye to Lila in the shoe shop, where she finds her with Nino, realizing they have resumed their affair.

Lila becomes pregnant, and decides to leave her husband to live with Nino. She disappears from the neighborhood for twenty-three days. Michele Solara asks Antonio, who is now working for him, to find her. Antonio finds the couple and beats up Nino, but does not tell Michele. Instead, he tells his childhood friends Enzo and Pasquale. Enzo helps Lila, taking her back to the neighborhood. Stefano is overjoyed that Lila is pregnant, not believing her when she says that the baby is not his, and the whole neighborhood decides to pretend that she was spending time with Lenù in Pisa.

In the meanwhile, Lenù has a hard time with her studies in Pisa, because of her poverty and lack of cultural capital, and because of the prejudices of other students, who mock her Neapolitan accent. She has a relationship with Franco Mari. At the end of her studies, she begins a relationship with Pietro Airota, the son of a renowned professor.

While preparing for her thesis, Lenù remains disturbed by her relation with Donato Sarratore, and writes about it in a notebook. One day, she receives a box with the possessions of her old schoolteacher, Maestra Oliviero, which includes The Blue Fairy, the book she had written with Lila when they were little girls, and recognizes in the book the heart of her writings. She gives the story she wrote to Pietro, who passes it on to his mother, Adele, who works at a publishing house. To Lenù's surprise, Adele calls her to say that she wants to publish the tale as a book.

Lila, in the meanwhile, has given birth to her son Gennaro (called Rino, like her brother). She spends a lot of time trying to educate the child, determined that he should have a better fate than the children of the neighborhood. Realizing that Stefano has been having an affair with Ada, and not being able to stand his violence anymore, she finally leaves him, and goes to live with Enzo in a working class neighborhood, San Giovanni a Teduccio. She starts working in the sausage factory that belongs to Bruno Soccavo. Lenù goes to visit her there, finding her in awful conditions; the two reconcile and declare they do not want to lose one another. Lenù gives Lila The Blue Fairy, which Lila claims not to remember. As Lenù leaves, she spots Lila throwing the book into a furnace.

The novel ends when Lenù is in a bookstore presenting her book. She is viciously criticized by a journalist, who calls the book obscene. To her surprise, an audience member starts to defend her, and she recognizes him as Nino Sarratore.

== Characters ==
- Elena Greco (Lenù or Lenuccia), the protagonist and main character. She finishes high school in Naples as the first person of her family to do so, and goes to university in the Scuola Normale di Pisa. After graduating, she published a novel.
- Raffaella Cerullo (Lila or Lina), married at the age of sixteen to Stefano Carraci. She has an affair with Nino Sarratore, who leaves her when she is pregnant. She goes back to Carraci, who refuses to believe that the child is not his. She finally leaves her husband, after years of domestic violence, to live with her childhood friend Enzo, and her son Rino.
- Stefano Carracci, Lila's violent husband and owner of a growing business.
- Giovanni Sarratore (Nino), son of Donato Sarratore. He starts an affair with Lila while she is married to Stefano.
- Giuseppina Carracci (Pinuccia), sister to Stefano, she becomes pregnant by Rino and marries him during the novel.
- Gennaro Cerullo (Rino), Lila's older brother and Pinuccia's husband. He becomes obsessed by the idea of becoming wealthy.

== Reception ==
Joseph Luzzi, writing for The New York Times, comments "Elena Ferrante is this rare bird: so deliberate in building up her story that you almost give up on it, so gifted that by the end she has you in tears." Critics have praised the diversity of tones in the book, that goes from the "sweetness and beauty" of the moments in Ischia, "the intensity of youthful romance", to "the fate of women in a masculine society".

Joanna Walsh, notes for The Guardian:

Behind the Neapolitan novels is a sense of "the violence in every house, every family" based in an unspeakable "before": the brutality and betrayals of the Second World War. Lenú, brought up speaking not Italian, but Neapolitan, becomes fluent in the language of schoolbooks. When "language itself in fact, had become a mark of alienation" she leaves the city for university. Groped on a bus, Lenú reverts to dialect: "I said unrepeatable words … what was the use of years of middle school, high school, university, in that city?"
