= The Lying Life of Adults =

2019 novel by Elena Ferrante

- Cover of first edition (Italy)
- Author: Elena Ferrante
- Audio read by: Anna Bonaiuto
- Original title: La vita bugiarda degli adulti
- Translator: Ann Goldstein
- Language: Italian
- Set in: Naples
- Publisher: Edizioni e/o
- Publication date: 7 November 2019
- Publication place: Italy
- English publication date: 1 September 2020
- Media type: Print (paperback)
- Pages: 336
- ISBN: 9788833571683
- OCLC: 1128092847

The Lying Life of Adults (Italian: La vita bugiarda degli adulti) is a 2019 novel by Elena Ferrante. It was adapted into a television series of the same name by Edoardo De Angelis in 2023.

== Synopsis ==
In Naples in the early 1990s, twelve-year-old Giovanna Trada overhears her father, Andrea, disparagingly liken her appearance to that of his estranged sister Vittoria. This sends Giovanna on a search for Vittoria across Naples to discover the nature of the family's fallout.

== Publication ==
The novel was first published in Italy in November 2019 by Edizioni e/o, published as part of their Dal Mondo series. An English translation by Ann Goldstein was scheduled to be published by Europa Editions on 9 June 2020, but was postponed to 1 September 2020 due to the COVID-19 pandemic. The English translation debuted at number two on The New York Times fiction best-seller list.

== Reception ==
In its starred review, Kirkus Reviews praised Goldstein's "fluid" translation and wrote, "Giovanna's nascent sexuality is more frankly explored than that of previous Ferrante protagonists".

Publishers Weekly called Giovanna a "winning character" but nonetheless wrote that the novel "feels minor in comparison to Ferrante's previous work".

A review by Parul Sehgal in The New York Times stated that the book "evokes for me all the ordinary, warring paradoxes of intimate life."

== Television adaptation ==
In May 2020, Netflix announced it would be adapting The Lying Life of Adults into a television series of the same name in collaboration with Italy's Fandango production company. The series was released by Netflix in January 2023.
