= The Story of the Lost Child =

2014 novel by Elena Ferrante

- First edition cover
- Author: Elena Ferrante
- Original title: Storia della bambina perduta
- Translator: Ann Goldstein
- Series: Neapolitan Novels
- Publisher: Europa Editions
- Publication date: 2014
- English publication date: 2015
- Pages: 480
- ISBN: 9781609452865
- Preceded by: My Brilliant Friend, The Story of a New Name, Those Who Leave and Those Who Stay

The Story of the Lost Child (Italian: Storia della bambina perduta) is a 2014 novel written by Italian author Elena Ferrante. It is the fourth and final installment of her Neapolitan Novels, preceded by My Brilliant Friend, The Story of a New Name, and Those Who Leave and Those Who Stay. It was translated into English by Ann Goldstein in 2015.

Since 2018, the series of books has been adapted for a TV series, produced by HBO and RAI. The final season of the series, adapted from the fourth novel, premiered on HBO on September 9, 2024.

== Plot ==
After spending two pleasant weeks with Nino in France, Lenù comes back home and insists on getting a divorce. She leaves her children with Pietro’s parents. After two years of relationships with Nino, she discovers that he had lied about leaving his wife. She decides however to continue with him, and to go back to Naples. There, she once again becomes pregnant. Lila becomes pregnant at the same time by Enzo, and they give birth to two daughters only three weeks apart. Lila names her daughter Nunzia (known as Tina), like her mother, and Lenù names her daughter Immacolata (known as Imma), also like her mother, who is dying of cancer.

Lenù discovers through Lila that Nino continues to be unfaithful, having had a series of affairs and even propositioned Lila again. She decides to leave him and goes back to the neighborhood, living close to Lila.

Michele Solara attacks Lila at the funeral of Alfonso Carracci, killed in a homophobic attack. In response, Lila and Lenù write an article denouncing the Solaras, who now sell heroin in the neighborhood. The article brings more fame to Lenù, who has just published her third book.

On September 16, 1984, Lenù invites Nino for lunch, asking him to see his daughter Imma more often. While everyone is outside, and Nino is speaking to Lila, Tina disappears mysteriously. In spite of all their efforts, they are unable to locate her or to find out what happened. Enzo becomes destroyed by pain, believing the Solaras have killed her as payback, while Lila believes that she is still alive. Their relationship falls apart after the loss of the child.

The Solaras are assassinated in front of the church a while later. Pasquale and Nadia are arrested for their role as communist activists during the seventies, but Pasquale refuses to answer if he is responsible for the Solaras' murder.

In 1992, Lenù leaves the neighborhood, moving with her daughters to Turin. Sometime between 2005 and 2010, Lenù breaks a promise she had made to Lila and writes about her, publishing a book about their lives called A Friendship. After this, Lila ceases contact with her.

In the following years, Lenù's daughters move out of the country, and she becomes a grandmother.

=== Epilogue ===
In 2010, after finishing her written account of her and Lila's lives together, Lenù receives a package in the mail. Inside, she finds the dolls, Tina and Nu, that she and Lila played with as children, and which Lila had asserted were lost. Lenù cannot decide if she believes this gift is meant as a final insult, or as a reassurance to Lenù that Lila still loves her. Either way, she resigns herself to the idea that she will never see Lila again.

== Characters ==
- Elena Greco (Lenù) - the narrator of the story. After leaving her husband, she moves back to Naples to be with Nino. She leaves him too, and decides to go back to the neighborhood of her childhood.
- Raffaella Cerullo (Lila or Lina) - she has a daughter, Tina, that disappears in mysterious circumstances. That, plus the death of her friend Alfonso and the discovery that her son Rino is addicted to heroin, have a great effect on her. She fights all her life against Michele Solara, a man with Camorra connections. She disappears at the age of 60.
- Enzo Scanno - Lila's common-law husband, leaves town after the disappearance of their daughter Tina.
- Michele Solara - Lila's enemy, who starts selling heroin in the neighborhood, including to her brother and her son Rino. He is violent and sadistic, causing suffering to Alfonso and attacking Lila. He is killed with his brother.

== Reception ==
The novel was very well received by the critics, with The Guardian calling it "a frighteningly insightful finale".

Elissa Schappel, writing for Vanity Fair, reviewed the last book of the Quartet as "This is Ferrante at the height of her brilliance." Judith Shulevitz in The Atlantic, praised particularly how the books circle back to its start, to Lila and Lenu's childhood games, in the final installment. Maureen Corregan has also praised the ending of the novels, calling it "Perfect Devastation".

Roger Cohen wrote for The New York Review of Books: "The interacting qualities of the two women are central to the quartet, which is at once introspective and sweeping, personal and political, covering the more than six decades of the two women’s lives and the way those lives intersect with Italy’s upheavals, from the revolutionary violence of the leftist Red Brigades to radical feminism."

Darren Franich has called the novels the series of the decade, saying: "The Neapolitan Novels are the series of the decade because they are so clearly of this decade: conflicted, revisionist, desperate, hopeful, revolutionary, euphorically feminine even in the face of assaultive male corrosion." In 2024, the New York Times ranked The Story of the Lost Child as #80 of the best 100 books of the 21st century.
