= The Old Man by the Sea =

2024 novel by Domenico Starnone

- Author: Domenico Starnone
- Original title: Il vecchio al mare
- Translator: Oonagh Stransky
- Language: Italian
- Genre: Literary fiction
- Publisher: Einaudi, Europa Editions
- Publication date: March 2024
- Publication place: Italy
- English publication date: August 2025
- Pages: 145
- ISBN: 979-8-88966-130-6

The Old Man by the Sea (Italian: Il vecchio al mare) is a 2024 novel by Italian author Domenico Starnone, first published by Einaudi in Italian and by Europa Editions in English a year later with a translation by Oonagh Stransky. The title is a reference to Ernest Hemingway's The Old Man and the Sea, with a similarly close name in Italian.

It follows an old Italian man, Nico Gamurra, and his interactions with a small group at a seaside town where he recently started vacationing, including a young woman who brings up his childhood memories of his much older mother. The novel is largely centered around Nico's relationships with the inhabitants of the town, particularly the women, and how they relate to those memories, while at the same time he approaches the end of his life. It received positive reviews from critics, both of the work itself and Stransky's translation.

== Plot ==
Nicola "Nico" Gamurra, an 82-year-old Italian man, is renting a house on the beach to the south of Rome. A writer, he spends his days there at the beach while observing people, writing stories and sleeping. While walking there, he feels dazed and notices a shimmering gold outline of a figure rush by him into the sand. He briefly attempts to follow it when he sees it reappear again further down the beach, but is unable to for more than a few steps before he feels unwell, rubbing a big toe with a blackened toenail. He reminisces about his past while writing and falling asleep, thinking about his ex-wives, children and grandchildren. He talks to Evelina, a woman in her early 60s, and learns that she is married to a man named Silvestro and runs a clothing boutique. Later, he sees a 24-year-old woman, Lu, dragging a kayak into the water. He reminisces about his clothes-maker mother, Rosa, while observing Lu, hallucinating Rosa over her despite their lack of physical similarities.

Nico heads into the beachside town and looks into buying a canoe from a shop ran by Silvestro, an unscrupulous businessman. When Lu walks by and coldly greets Silvestro, Nico decides to follower her to the boutique where she works as an assistant to Evelina. He asks her to try on some clothes to serve as a model for his mother, but purchases them for her instead. Days later at the beach he meets Maurizio, a teacher who was fired for being "odious", with a metal detector that he loans to Nico. Unable to sleep, Nico returns with it, sees a woman flee past him after an argument, and finds a gold money clip.

Nico begins visiting the boutique regularly in addition to the beach, talking with Evelina and Lu. He meets Lu's young son, Nini, and tells him about a sea monster in the ocean. He later meets Gino, Lu's boyfriend, an engineer who wished he became a writer. He receives an invitation to the boutique for a get-together with Evelina and four of her friends and clients, who spend hours trying on clothes while Lu assists. Nico gets Lu out of the background by asking her to test the fit for clothes for his granddaughter and begins hallucinating his mother onto Lu more strongly than before. Afterwards, he asks Lu to teach him how to use the overpriced inflatable kayak he bought from Silvestro.

While meeting Evelina, he kisses her at her invitation, though she warns him that Silvestro is a "bad man", but says she will tell him about the kiss. Days pass alone writing and thinking about Rosa's death and the troubling relations with his father. Nini says Maurizio is his father, though he denies it; he is currently using the metal detector to look for something his ex-wife, Lu, lost. While kayaking out to sea, one of Eveline's friends accuses him of living out a fantasy of Hemmingway's The Old Man and the Sea.

Nico explains to Lu why he is spending his time and money on her, firmly denying that it is for sexual reasons. She agrees to teach him how to use the kayak and they spend days practicing. When she aggressively declares the end of the lessons, she asks him to paddle from the beach to a pier and back. Towards the pier, Silvestro runs a jet ski towards Nico, but stops and only splashes him, threatening to shoot him if he continues with Evelina. He returns to shore and talks with Lu, who is planning to leave for Venice with her son. He gives her the money clip, a gift from Eveline to Silvestro that she had taken and lost, which he was demanding be returned. Days later, again in pain on the beach, he sees the golden figure again, which he says has "definitively escaped from [his] decaying body". He reminisces about how he came to the beach - frustrated with his doctor for focusing on his incurable pancreatitis and cancer, not his blackened injured toenail.

== Publication history ==
The Old Man by the Sea was first published by Einaudi in March 2024. It was first published in English by Europa Editions on August 19, 2025, translated by Oonagh Stransky.

== Analysis and themes ==
The Old Man by the Sea immediately and intentionally draws comparisons to Hemingway's The Old Man and the Sea; the titles are similarly close in Italian (Il vecchio al mare and Il vechhio e il mare). Other similarities include Nico's warnings to Nini about a sea monster, and the explicit comparison of himself to the "bold, jocular male" that serves as the protagonist of The Old Man and the Sea. The Harvard Review wrote that the common thread was "one man's test of will", which, for Nico, is his quest for understanding his life. Beyond just Hemingway, the novel also draws from Victor Hugo's The Toilers of the Sea, which Nico reads on the beach one day, as well as multiple direct references, such as the island of Sark and a giant octopus.

The novel frequently addresses Nico's upcoming death. The Financial Times' Christian House compared it to Starnone's 2021 novel The Mortal and Immortal Life of the Girl from Milan. Both works discuss death and "the vagaries and limits of language", but House viewed the former as a comedy and the latter as a tragedy. Writing for the New York Review of Books, Tim Parks considered the sea to represent a "memento mori" for Nico, that he sought to distract himself from, while The Globe and Mail's Emily Donaldson argued his actions throughout the novel and the glowing golden figure show that he went to the town as preparation for his own death.

Parks argued that, aside from the plot, Starnone's main focus in the novel is on the women, with the most important scene being the "playfully lush episode" where Lu tries on clothes after Evelina's friends finish. Donaldson considered "[c]reepy Freudian overtones" about Nico's relationship with Lu to have been "quashed" by the revelations of Nico's relationship with his mother and father, as his mother used clothes to give herself a feeling of safety. Writing for the Harvard Review, Gabrielle McClellan wrote that a dream Nico had one night of women revitalizing themself with water from lotus flowers that ends with Nico being transformed into a woman himself is him "[e]nvisioning himself as what torments him most" as he attempts understand his past and himself.

== Reception ==
It received a starred review from Kirkus Reviews, who praised Strasnky's translation and Starnone's writing and "achingly sweet humor". World Literature Today's Robert Allen Papinchak and NPR's Colin Dwyer also praised its sweetness and humor. Publishers Weekly described it as a "smoldering mood piece" that showed off "a man's inner world". Under the Radar's Frank Valish wrote that it was "a short gem" that "packs an emotional punch" because of how it handles important topics. The Daily Telegraph's Sam Boehmer considered it to sometimes be "too obviously self-conscious as an evocation of old age", but regarded it as Starnone, "one of the most accomplished and successful writers of his generation", contemplating his own body of work. Critical reception for Strasnky's translation was consistently positive, varyingly regarded to be a "deft", "dreamy" and "elegantly translated" work.

The New Yorker listed it as one of the best books of 2025, and Kirkus Reviews as one of the year's best works of translated fiction.
