= In the Margins: On the Pleasures of Reading and Writing =

Non fiction book by Italian Writer Elena Ferrante (2022)

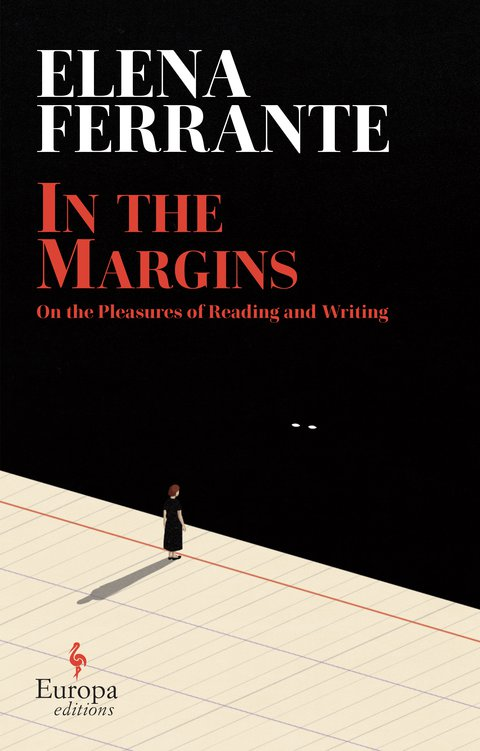
- Author: Elena Ferrante
- Original title: I Margini e il Dettato
- Translator: Ann Goldstein
- Language: Italian
- Genre: Essays
- Publisher: Edizioni E/O
- Publication date: 2021
- English publication date: 2022
- Pages: 112
- ISBN: 9781609457389

In the Margins: On the Pleasures of Reading and Writing (Italian: I margini e il dettato, lit. 'The Margins and the Dictation') is a book of essays published in 2021 by Italian writer Elena Ferrante.

The book was based on a series of lectures first presented in the Umberto Eco lecture series in the University of Bologna, from 17 to 19 of November 2011. The text was read by Italian actress Manuela Mandracchia.

== Essays ==
The book is composed by four essays, three of which were presented at the University of Bologna.

=== “Pain and Pen” ===
The first essay relates between two ways of writing, one precise and disciplined, and one more convulsive.

The margins between them become a metaphor for the tension in her writing between “careful” precision and a more “unruly” instinct, where the words “erupt” and overflow, as she says, drawing on volcanic imagery. Ferrante uses examples taken from Virginia Woolf and Samuel Beckett to portray how writing is to keep these two impulses in balance.

According to Ferrante, women writers struggle to write the second way, because they discipline themselves to write like men. Ferrante herself was caught in the trap of believing that writing well meant writing in a masculine way, until she started reading the works of women like Gaspara Stampa and Gertrude Stein.

=== “Aquamarine” ===
The second essay tackles the issues of realism, wondering if it's possible to write how things really are. An aquamarine ring, which used to belong to the author's mother, is used to demonstrate her reasoning: “the aquamarine was changeable, part of a changing reality, a changing me.”

In order to accomplish a sense of realism, Ferrante uses the works of Italian theorist Adriana Cavarero, especially her concept of a “necessary other”. In Cavarero's works, the impulse to write comes from a woman telling another her story, in order to hear it being told back to her. It is this relational character that gives Ferrante's novels the dialogue that critic Tiziana de Rogatis has defined as “polyphonic.”

=== “Histories, I” ===
Ferrante also mentions the classic The Life and Opinions of Tristram Shandy, Gentleman, by Laurence Sterne. In this book the concept of writing as a “conversation” is subverted by the narrator's egotistic, digressive, first-person account of his life, and his depiction of opinions as counting more than objective facts. However, as critics have pointed out, "the identity emerging from that dialogue with a 'necessary other'—Sterne’s reader, who is addressed directly from every corner of the novel—is elusive and domineering. While the narrator invokes the need for reciprocity, the reader ends up being trapped in a narrative time ruled by digressions and procrastination." She opposes to this Gertrude Stein's The Autobriography of Alice B. Toklas, which, in spite of its name, was written by Stein herself. A real person, who was also typing the book as Stein dictated it, becomes this way the "necessary other".

Ferrante writes about how women have been erased from culture, claiming that writers feel obliged to read the canonical writers, who are predominantly male, while many cultures men have not read Elsa Morante, Natalia Ginzburg, Anna Maria Ortese, Jane Austen, the Brontë sisters, or Virginia Woolf. She encourages women to identify other women writers to form their History, using the poetry of Emily Dickinson to frame the idea. She claims that reproducing this is important not only on a cultural level, but on a political one.

=== “Dante’s Rib.” ===
The final essay, composed for a different seminar in Florence, is an appreciation of Dante Alighieri, and, more specifically, of his muse, Beatrice.

== Reception ==
The book was well received by critics, seen widely as a peek inside the writer's mind.

As Molly Young writes for The New York Times, the book is "a philosophical monograph on the nature of writing" and also "a practical manual."

== Bibliography ==
Ferrante, Elena (2022), In the Margins: On the Pleasures of Reading and Writing, translated by Goldstein, Ann, Europa Editions, p. 112, ISBN 9781609457389.
