= Tommaso Debenedetti =

Italian journalist and author (born on 10 February 1969)

Tommaso Debenedetti (born in 1969) is an Italian writer and a schoolteacher in Rome who is known for writing fake news. He is a father of two children. In the 2000s, Debenedetti tricked a number of Italian newspapers into publishing fake, lengthy interviews that he claimed to have conducted with various famous personalities, such as American writers John Grisham, Gore Vidal and Philip Roth. The last one proved to be his undoing: in 2010, a journalist from la Repubblica asked Roth about criticisms of Barack Obama that he had allegedly made in an interview for Libero; Roth was confused because the quotes were completely opposite to his view. This triggered a media reaction and scrutiny of Debendetti's other work.

Since 2011, Debenedetti has created fake Twitter accounts of famous world personalities, spreading fake news. In 2012, a hoax announcing the death of Syrian president Assad created a global rise in the price of oil. Other Debenedetti Twitter hoaxes were picked by important news sources, fooling many newspapers, including The New York Times, The Guardian, USA Today, and Neue Zürcher Zeitung, as well as world leaders and organizations. In June 2020, Debenedetti published fake tweet about death of Milan Kundera under Twitter account pretending to be of Petr Drulák, former Czech ambassador to France. The information had been published by Polish newspaper Gazeta Wyborcza, but it was subsequently denied by Kundera's family, Czech embassy in France and Drulák himself.

In March 2022, he falsely reported the death of author Kazuo Ishiguro using a Twitter account pretending to be that of Faber and Faber. The story was reported as fact by RTÉ Radio 1's Morning Ireland show and was later corrected by Ryan Tubridy on the same radio channel. In 2022, he created a fake Twitter account in which he claimed that Pope Benedict XVI had died, something that did occur later that year. In October 2023, he used a Twitter account purporting to be that of Claudia Goldin to falsely claim that Amartya Sen had died. In June 2025, he claimed that the Austrian playwright, novelist and winner of the 2004 Nobel Prize in Literature, Elfriede Jelinek, had died.

Debenedetti as said he does the hoaxes "to show how easy it is to fool the press in the era of social media". Mario Vargas Llosa, in his 2015 essay "Notes of the death of culture", called Debenedetti as a "hero of the civilization of the spectacle".
