= My Brilliant Friend =

2011 novel by Elena Ferrante

- First edition cover
- Author: Elena Ferrante
- Original title: L'amica geniale
- Translator: Ann Goldstein
- Language: Italian
- Genre: Literary fiction; Bildungsroman; Autofiction
- Publisher: Edizioni e/o (Italian); Europa Editions (English)
- Publication date: 2011
- Publication place: Italy
- English publication date: 2012
- ISBN: 9781609450786
- Followed by: The Story of a New Name (2012)

My Brilliant Friend (Italian: L'amica geniale) is a 2011 literary-fiction novel by pseudonymous Italian author Elena Ferrante. It is the first volume of a four-part series known collectively as the Neapolitan Novels. It was originally published in Italian by Edizioni e/o; an English translation by Ann Goldstein was published by Europa Editions in 2012.

== Plot ==
The novel begins in 2010 when the narrator, Elena Greco (Lenù), receives a phone call from the son of an old friend, saying that his mother has disappeared, leaving no traces of herself in the house. Elena recognizes this behavior as something her friend Raffaella Cerullo (whom she calls Lila, and everyone else calls Lina) has always talked about doing, and believes her disappearance to be a conscious decision. In the spirit of their loving but ambivalent ways towards each other, Elena breaks the promise she had made not to write about her friend, and begins to put on paper everything she can remember about Lila, beginning in 1950s Naples.

Elena and Lila grow up in a poor neighborhood full of violence and strife. Very few children receive an education beyond elementary school. Elena is diligent and captures the attention of maestra Oliviero, one of her primary school teachers, who encourages her to escape the life of the impoverished plebeian class. To everyone's surprise, the very rebellious Lila turns out to be a prodigy who has taught herself to read and write. She quickly earns the highest grades in the class, seemingly without effort. Elena is both fascinated and intimidated by Lila, especially after Lila writes a story which Elena feels shows real genius. She begins to push herself to keep up with Lila. Once, when Lila throws Elena's doll into the basement chute of the local loan shark, Elena does the same to Lila's doll, as proof that she can be as bold as her friend. When Lila fearlessly goes to the loan shark to ask for the return of the dolls, Elena goes with her, though they are ultimately unable to retrieve them.

The paths of the two girls diverge when Lila's parents refuse to pay for further education after elementary school. After being pressured by the concerned teacher, Elena's father agrees to pay for Elena to continue studying. Lila insists in going to middle school also, which so enrages her father that he throws her through a glass window one floor above the courtyard, breaking her arm. Lila encourages Elena to skip school and go to the sea, changing her mind and rushing home soon afterwards. Elena understands that this was an ambivalent attempt to get Elena's parents to withdraw their support for her education. Elena forgives Lila, knowing how hard it is for Lila to be left behind while she moves forward. Elena attends middle school and eventually high school.

With Elena studying, Lila occupies herself with her father's shoe shop. Much to his irritation, she dreams of designing new types of shoes to make them rich. She also grows very beautiful, attracting most of the neighborhood's young men, including Marcello Solara, the young son of the powerful local Camorra leader. Despite being pressured by her family to marry Marcello, Lila resists because she considers the Solaras to be fundamentally evil. To escape Marcello, she accepts Stefano Carracci, the son of the loan shark and owner of the local grocery, when he asks her to marry him. Stefano seems to appreciate Lila's originality, by buying a pair of shoes she made that are her original design, and thus convincing her father that her ideas are valuable. Lila and Stefano marry when she is sixteen, throwing a large party to which they invite the whole neighborhood. The party is the climax of the novel. There Lenù reflects on the way professor Olivero used to speak about the people of the neighborhood as "plebs":

At that moment I knew what the plebs were, much more clearly than when, years earlier, she had asked me. The plebs were us. The plebs were that fight for food and wine, that quarrel over who should be served first and better, that dirty floor on which the waiters clattered back and forth, those increasingly vulgar toasts. The plebs were my mother, who had drunk wine and now was leaning against my father’s shoulder, while he, serious, laughed, his mouth gaping, at the sexual allusions of the metal dealer. They were all laughing, even Lila, with the expression of one who has a role and will play it to the utmost.

The novel ends with the arrival of Marcello Solara, who was invited against Lila's will, and arrives wearing the shoes that she had made and that Stefano bought. This pivotal moment shows Lila and Lenù that Stefano was actually no different from Marcello.

== Main characters ==
- Elena Greco (also known as Lenù or Lenuccia), the narrator and main character of the novel. She is the first-born child of the Greco family and has three young siblings. The novel follows her from age six, when she enters school and meets Lila, until the age of 16.
- Raffaella Cerullo (known to all as Lina, and by Lenù as Lila), Lenù's best friend, whose disappearance leads her to write the novel. Lila is considered by most to be very intelligent, but she is not allowed to continue with a formal education after elementary school. She is also known as an unruly, wild child. The novel ends with her marriage, at the age of 16, to Stefano Carracci.
- Stefano Carracci, the son of Don Achille and Maria Carraci, brother to Pinuccia and Alfonso. Marries Lila at the end of the novel, when it is revealed that he had a deal with Marcello Solara, the man she believed she was escaping.
- Don Achille, father to Stefano, Pinuccia and Alfonso. A contrabandist feared by the whole neighborhood, that the young girls relate to an ogre. He is murdered when they are children.
- Pasquale and Carmela Peluso. Friends of Lila and Lenù. Pasquale becomes involved with the communist party.
- Melina, known to all as the crazy widow, having had a mental breakdown after being left by her lover Donato Sarratore. Mother to Antonio and Ada.
- Antonio Cappuccio, friend to Lenù and Lila. Dates Lenù during their teenage years.
- Giovanni "Nino" Sarratore, son of Donato Sarratore, leaves the neighborhood when they are little. Lenù is secretly infatuated with him.
- The Solara brothers, Marcello and Michele, sons of the local loan shark, insinuated to have Camorra connections.
- Maestra Oliviero teaches Lila and Lenù in elementary school, and pressures the Greco family into sending Lenù to middle and later high school.

== Reception ==
In what has been characterized as the "seminal review" of the novel, James Wood, writing for The New Yorker, called it a "large, captivating, amiably peopled bildungsroman" and a "beautiful and delicate tale of confluence and reversal".

Vogue praised the novel for providing "[o]ne of the more nuanced portraits of feminine friendship in recent memory", and said that the author "wisely balances her memoir-like emotional authenticity with a wry sociological understanding of a society on the verge of dramatic change".

In 2019, The Guardian ranked My Brilliant Friend the 11th best book since 2000, deeming it "[p]owerfully intimate and unashamedly domestic". The overall series was also listed in Vulture as one of the 12 "New Classics" since 2000, with Maris Kreizman noting that "Ferrante fever struck readers all over the world".

In a 2024 survey of "hundreds of novelists, nonfiction writers, academics" by The New York Times Book Review, My Brilliant Friend was named the #1 book of the 21st century; its staff described the novel as "encompassing ideas about art and politics, class and gender, philosophy and fate, all through a dedicated focus on the conflicted, competitive friendship between Elena and Lila". The Book Review further noted that the novel "is entrenched as one of the premier examples of so-called autofiction, a category that has dominated the literature of the 21st century". The last volume in the series, The Story of the Lost Child, appears on the list as well, as #80.

Roxana Robinson declared Ferrante "one of the great novelists of our time". Also writing for the Book Review, Juliet Lapidos was more reserved, noting that "The charismatic and mysterious Lila is eminently crush-worthy, but it doesn’t take much hermeneutic detective work to see that Ferrante thinks her namesake protagonist is brilliant in her own right"; she described Goldstein's translation as "lucid".

=== Sales and accolades ===
As of December 2016, the series at large had sold 5.5 million copies globally, including about two million in North America – "rare commercial blockbuster from an anonymous author in translation". By July 2024, the first entry alone had sold 10 million copies. In the United Kingdom, My Brilliant Friend was the top-selling translated literary novel in 2015, selling more than 100,000 copies.

In 2015, Goldstein's translation of the novel was short-listed by the American Literary Translators Association for the inaugural Italian Prose in Translation Award.

== Adaptation ==
In 2017, it was announced that HBO, RAI and TIMvision were adapting the series for television, beginning with the first novel and adapting each book into an eight-episode season. The show is an Italian- and Neapolitan-language coming-of-age drama television series created by Saverio Costanzo, starring in the first season Elisa Del Genio (season 1, guest season 2) and Margherita Mazzucco (seasons 1–3) as Elena "Lenù" Greco, and Ludovica Nasti (season 1, guest season 2) and Gaia Girace (seasons 1–3) as Raffaella "Lila" Cerullo.
