= Nasty Love =

1995 film

- Film poster
- Directed by: Mario Martone
- Written by: Mario Martone; Elena Ferrante
- Produced by: Angelo Curti; Andrea Occhipinti; Kermit Smith
- Starring: Anna Bonaiuto
- Cinematography: Luca Bigazzi
- Edited by: Jacopo Quadri
- Music by: Steve Lacy; Alfred Shnitke
- Release date: 12 April 1995
- Running time: 104 minutes
- Country: Italy
- Language: Italian

Nasty Love (Italian: L'amore molesto) (released in the United States as Troubling Love) is a 1995 Italian thriller film directed by Mario Martone. It was entered into the 1995 Cannes Film Festival. It is based on the novel of the same name, by Elena Ferrante. The film was shot mainly in Naples, Italy.

== Plot ==
Delia, a Neapolitan artist who has lived for many years in Bologna, returns to Naples after the sudden death of her mother Amalia, who apparently committed suicide by drowning. She doesn't believe the official verdict of suicide, convinced that her mother's exuberance, vivacity and existential positivity, which she remembers very well, would never have led her to do such a thing. She therefore begins to investigate her mother's recent past, given further impetus by disturbing phone calls received from an unknown interlocutor, whose nickname is Caserta.

The fragmentary reconstruction of the last days of her mother's life brings to light remote events that Delia had hidden and buried in her memory, and force her to contemplate a reality different from what she had hitherto understood. Delia remembers and relives the moment when, under the influence of her oppressive father, she breaks her relationship with her mother, accused by her husband of an affair with Caserta.

Finally, Delia recalls what was the cause of everything: as a child, she was subjected to pedophilia by Caserta's father, but she did not report the incident and told her father that her mother and Caserta, who seemed to be nothing more than friends, were lovers (this was also due to a sort of jealousy towards her mother herself); her father, very jealous of his wife whose beauty enchanted many men, began to beat her and, together with her brother-in-law, also Caserta and the latter's son, Antonio. Caserta, as if to "get revenge" on Delia's father, began to send Amalia gifts of all kinds, each time unleashing the fury of her husband, who regularly beat her. Shortly before committing suicide, Amalia resumed her relationship with Caserta, with whom she went for a walk on the beach one evening, and during which she left him, who had fallen asleep in the meantime, letting herself drown.

Delia, having ideally reconciled with her mother, and having become aware that she has more in common with her than she believed or wanted, is ready to return to Bologna with a renewed self-awareness.

== Cast ==
- Anna Bonaiuto as Delia
- Angela Luce as Amalia
- Gianni Cajafa as Uncle Filippo
- Peppe Lanzetta as Antonio
- Licia Maglietta as Young Amalia
- Anna Calato as Signora De Riso
- Italo Celoro as Delia's Father
- Carmela Pecoraro as Delia, as a child
- Giovanni Viglietti as Caserta
- Lina Polito as Rosaria, Delia's Sister
- Enzo De Caro as Caserta in Flashbacks
- Francesco Paolantoni as Uncle Filippo in Flashbacks
- Piero Tassitano as Legal Doctor
- Marita D'Elia as Wanda, Delia's Sister
- Sabina Cangiano as Shop Assistant
- Beniamino Femiano as Cloakroom Attendant

== Awards ==
L'Amore Molesto won 3 David di Donatello Awards for Best Actress, Best Director and Best Supporting Actress and was nominated for 2 for Best Film and Best Producer. It was also nominated for a Palme d'Or by the Cannes Film Festival for director Mario Martone. Anna Bonaiuto also won a Silver Ribbon under the category of Best Actress for her role as Delia.
