= Sandra Petrignani =

Italian journalist and writer (born 1952)

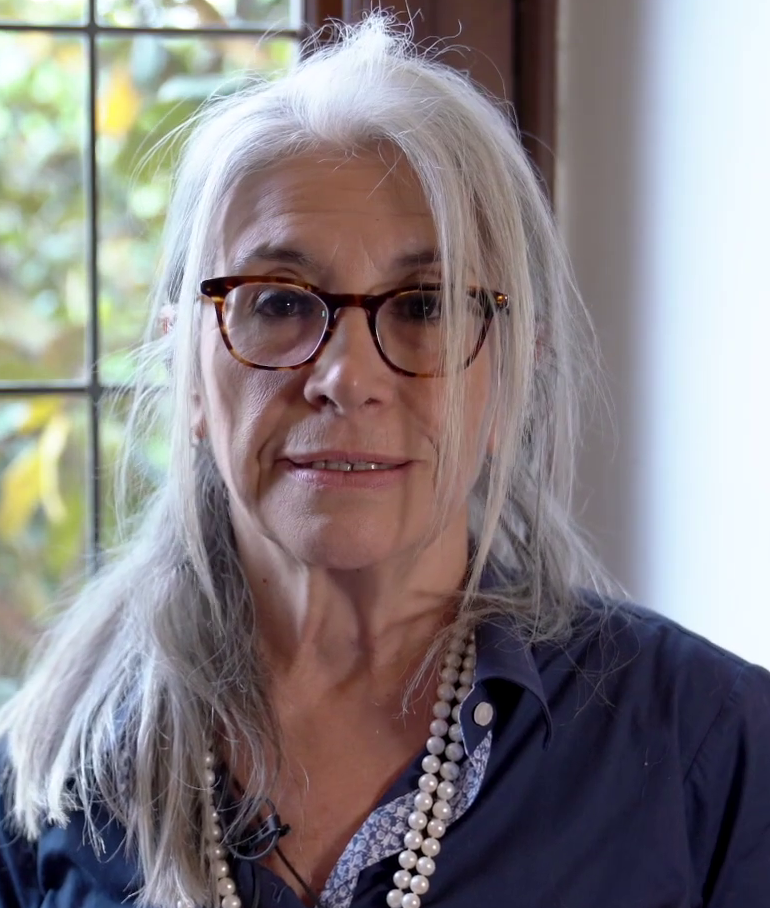
- Born: July 9, 1952 (age 73); Piacenza, Italy
- Occupation: Writer

Sandra Petrignani (born July 9, 1952) is an Italian journalist and writer.

She was born in Piacenza and received a literature degree from the University of Rome. Petrignani worked as a journalist, becoming an editor for Il Messaggero in 1987. In the same year, she won the Elsa Morante Prize for her novel Navigazioni di Circe. In 1989, she became editor for Panorama. Her short story collection Poche storie was a finalist for the Viareggio Prize in 1993. La scrittrice abita qui, published in 2002, was a finalist for the Strega Prize.

== Selected works ==
- Il catalogo dei giocattoli (1988), short stories
- Come cadono i fulmini (1991), novel
- Vecchi (1994), short stories
- Ultima India (1996), travel narrative
- Come fratello e sorella (1998), novel
- Dopo cena (1999), radio script
- Care presenze (2004), novel.
