= Claudio Gatti =

Italian investigative journalist

- Born: Rome
- Occupation: investigative journalist
- Employer: Il Sole 24 Ore

Claudio Gatti (born 22 October 1955 in Rome) is an Italian investigative journalist, based in New York City.

== Career ==
Claudio Gatti is a special correspondent for Il Sole 24 Ore and writes for The New York Times, the International Herald Tribune and The Philadelphia Inquirer. He has written for Italian and foreign newspapers, and was a correspondent for L'Europeo, Deputy Director of The World and director of Italy Daily supplement. In the United States, Gatti is most well known for his investigative reporting on the identity of novelist Elena Ferrante. Published in October 2016 in New York Review of Books, and simultaneously in the Italian, German, and French press, Gatti's article quickly set off a firestorm of criticism.

== Awards ==
- Saint-Vincent journalism prize, 2003
- Premiolino journalism prize, 2005
