= The Lost Daughter (novel) =

2006 novel by Elena Ferrante

- Editor: Europa Editions
- Author: Elena Ferrante
- Original title: La Figlia Oscura
- Translator: Ann Goldstein
- Publication date: 2006
- English publication date: 2008
- ISBN: 9781933372426

The Lost Daughter is a novel published by writer Elena Ferrante in 2006, in Italian (original title: La Figlia Oscura), and translated to English by Ann Goldstein in 2008.

The novel was adapted to cinema in the film of the same name, in Maggie Gyllenhaal's directorial debut, starring Olivia Colman, Jessie Buckley and Dakota Johnson.

== Plot ==
Leda is an English literature professor who decides to spend the summer holidays alone on the Ionian coast. Her twenty-year-old daughters, Bianca and Marta, are in Canada with her ex-husband Gianni, so Leda is free to spend time alone. After renting a small penthouse with a sea view, the woman goes to the beach and begins her vacation. On its first day she notices a young mother with her daughter and the two impress Leda not only because they are decidedly more refined than the rest of their rough family, but also because she sees in them echoes of her own past.

As the days go by, Leda continues to observe the Neapolitan family, learns their dynamics and discovers the names of the young mother and the child: Nina and Elena. Leda's fascination for the two pushes her to discover more and more about them, also thanks to the young lifeguard Gino. Over the weekend, the family expands with the arrival of other relatives, including Nina's husband, an older and less refined man for whom Leda feels an instant repulsion. While she rages into the joyful noise of the beach, Leda realizes that Nina is desperately looking for Elena and the teacher recalls a similar episode from her youth, when she had lost her daughter on the beach. Moved with compassion, Leda goes in search of Elena and ends up finding her and bringing her back to her family. She also finds the girl's doll and, without knowing why, hides it in her bag and takes it away with her.

Leda is determined to return the doll the next day, but bad weather forces her to postpone her plans and postpone her return to the beach. While she walks around the town, the woman goes to a toy store to buy some clothes for the doll; here she meets Nina, Elena and Rosaria (the young mother's sister-in-law), who thank her for having found her baby the day before and tell her that the little girl has been hysterical since she can no longer find the doll. Leda does not confess that she has the doll, and while she talks about motherhood with Nina and Rosaria, she admits to her own surprise that she abandoned her daughters for three years in infancy. Rosaria and Nina are disturbed by the news and hastily leave.

Determined to return the doll, Leda calls the number on a flyer posted by Elena's family to find the toy and it is Nina who answers, who is in the midst of an intimate moment with Gino. In the following days, in which she still does not return the doll, Leda ends up understanding that her fascination with Nina arises above all from her recognizing herself in her. Like Nina, Leda too was a young and talented mother trapped in a claustrophobic and unnerving situation, from which she had then escaped when her daughters were still small to devote herself to an academic career and a relationship with an esteemed English professor. She had returned to her daughters only three years later and since then she had painstakingly rebuilt a relationship with them.

Gino asks Leda if he can use her house for a secret rendezvous with Nina, and she instructs him to tell Nina to ask her directly. Nina gets in touch with Leda, who invites her to her house. Leda tries to urge her to go back to studying, to leave her husband and do like her, but for Nina, Leda's behavior is clearly that of an unnatural mother. However, Leda agrees to leave her the keys to the apartment and also returns her toy. Nina reacts violently to the discovery that Leda has kept the doll all this time despite knowing how much Elena suffered without her, insults her and stabs her with a hatpin that Leda herself had given her. Left alone, Leda packs her bags and decides to go back to Florence, but before leaving the house she receives a phone call from her daughters. Her daughters ask her how she is, and Leda, moved, tells them "I'm dead, but I'm fine."

== Characters ==
- Leda: protagonist and narrator. Forty-eight-year-old English literature professor, divorced, mother of two daughters.
- Nina: young mother of twenty-two.
- Elena: also known as Lenù, Nina's daughter.
- Rosaria: Nina's sister-in-law, she is expecting her first child.
- Tonnino: Nina's husband, Rosaria's brother.
- Gino: lifeguard at the beach Leda frequents, interested in Nina.
- Giovanni: sixty nine year-old factotum, manages the apartment rented by Leda.
- Gianni: Leda's ex-husband,lives in Canada.
- Bianca: the eldest daughter of Leda and Gianni.
- Marta: the second daughter of Leda and Gianni.
- Professor Hardy: Esteemed Anglicist and Leda's lover for a time.

== Reception ==
The book was well received by critics. A main theme pointed out is that of what Leda calls "unnatural mothers", meaning on how she breaks "some of the sacred taboos of motherhood by putting her needs and ambitions before those of her daughters". Both the novel and the film adaptation manage to show the relation between a mother and a small child as symbiotic, but suffocating. By showing a talented young woman's despair at being closed at home, the novel allows us to rethink motherhood. According to critics: "This is Ferrante's devastating power as a novelist: she navigates the emotional minefields and unsparingly tallies the cycle of psychological damage among multiple generations of women in Leda's family in straightforward, almost curt language".

The doll stolen by Leda gains great dramatic importance, as critics have pointed out: "The doll is an emotional Rosetta stone, unleashing a flood of memories from Leda's own unhappy childhood, including her mother's endless threats to leave and her unhappy adulthood".

Several critics have also pointed out the similarity in themes with the most famous Neapolitan Novels, as a story of two women, one of which is an academic who leaves her daughters for a while, and the other a young mother married to what others call "a bad man".

== Adaptation ==
In 2018, Maggie Gyllenhaal acquired the rights to adapt Elena Ferrante's novel. In the same year, while the movie was still being produced, Elena Ferrante wrote about the adaptation in her column in The Guardian, saying that the story was "now hers [Gyllenhaal's] to tell". The column was later published in her non-fiction book, Incidental Inventions. Gylenhaal wrote and directed the film adaptation, which starred Olivia Colman, Jessie Buckley, Dakota Johnson, Peter Sarsgaard, Ed Harris and Paul Mescal.

The Lost Daughter premiered at the 78th Venice International Film Festival on September 3, 2021, where Gyllenhaal won the Golden Osella Award for Best Screenplay. It had a limited theatrical release in the United States on December 17, 2021, prior to streaming on Netflix on December 31. The film was acclaimed by critics, and at the 94th Academy Awards received three nominations: Best Actress (Colman), Best Supporting Actress (Buckley), and Best Adapted Screenplay.
