= Neapolitan Novels =

Four-part series of novels by Elena Ferrante (2011–2014)

- My Brilliant Friend; The Story of a New Name; Those Who Leave and Those Who Stay; The Story of the Lost Child
- Author: Elena Ferrante
- Original title: L'Amica Geniale, Storia del Nuovo Cognome, Storia di chi fugge e di chi resta, Storia della bambina perduta
- Translator: Ann Goldstein
- Country: Italy
- Language: Italian
- Publisher: Edizioni e/o; Europa Editions (English publisher)
- Published: 2011–2014
- Published in English: 2012–2015
- No. of books: Four

The Neapolitan Novels, also known as the Neapolitan Quartet, are a four-part series of fiction by the pseudonymous Italian author Elena Ferrante, published originally by Edizioni e/o, translated into English by Ann Goldstein and published by Europa Editions (New York). The English-language titles of the novels are My Brilliant Friend (2012), The Story of a New Name (2013), Those Who Leave and Those Who Stay (2014), and The Story of the Lost Child (2015). In the original Italian edition, the whole series bears the title of the first novel L'amica geniale (literally translated, "the brilliant friend"). The series has been characterized as a bildungsroman, or coming-of-age story. In an interview in Harper's Magazine, Elena Ferrante has stated that she considers the four books to be "a single novel" published serially for reasons of length and duration. The series has sold over 10 million copies in 40 countries.

The series follows the lives of two perceptive and intelligent girls, Elena (sometimes called "Lenù") Greco and Raffaella ("Lila") Cerullo, from childhood to adulthood and old age, as they try to create lives for themselves amidst the violent and stultifying culture of their home – a poor neighborhood on the outskirts of Naples, Italy. The novels are narrated by Elena Greco."

The series was adapted into a two-part play by April De Angelis at the Rose Theatre, Kingston, in March 2017. The Rose production, starring Niamh Cusack and Catherine McCormack, transferred to the Royal National Theatre in November 2019. The series has been adapted into an HBO television series entitled My Brilliant Friend.

== Synopsis ==
=== My Brilliant Friend (2011) ===
The series begins in the 1950s in a working-class neighborhood of Naples, where Elena, the narrator, meets Lila. They become best friends as six year-olds, though their relationship is complex and frequently antagonistic. The two remain close into adolescence, their paths diverging as Elena continues her education while Lila, despite her brilliance, goes to work. The novel ends in the midst of Lila's wedding at the age of sixteen.

=== The Story of a New Name (2012) ===
In The Story of a New Name, Lila quickly becomes disillusioned with her marriage, and sees herself trapped with a violent man. She also starts an affair, risking her life. Elena, meanwhile, continues her studies beyond what she ever thought would be possible, and explores the world outside of the neighborhood. The two young women share a complex and evolving bond that is central to their emotional lives and a source of strength in the face of life's challenges.

=== Those Who Leave and Those Who Stay (2013) ===
Elena and Lila have grown into womanhood. Lila, married at sixteen, now has a young son; she has left her husband and the comforts her marriage brought and now works in awful conditions in a factory in Naples. Elena has left the city, earned her college degree, and published a novel, but now finds herself also trapped in a stifling marriage. Both women are pushing against the walls, afloat on the great sea of opportunities that opened up for women during the 1970s.

=== The Story of the Lost Child (2014) ===
Both Lila and Elena once fought to escape the neighborhood in which they grew up. Elena married, moved to Florence with her husband, started a family, and published several well-received novels. In this final novel of the quartet, she returns to Naples to be with the man she has always loved. Lila, meanwhile, has become a successful entrepreneur, but she finds that it only draws her into closer proximity with the nepotism, chauvinism, and criminal violence that infect her neighborhood.

== Themes ==
=== Female friendship ===
Central themes in the novels include women's friendship and the shaping of women's lives by their social milieu, sexual and intellectual jealousy and competition within female friendships, and female ambivalence about filial and maternal roles and domestic violence. Isabelle Blank wrote about the complex, mirrored relation between the protagonists Lenu and Lila: "Lenù and Lila are foils for one another. Lenù is blonde, studious, eager to please, self-doubting and ambitious, whereas Lila is dark, naturally brilliant, mercurial, mean and irresistible to those around her. The story is told from Lenù's point of view, but the two friends understand one another on such a deep and complex level that the reader is often privy to Lila's perceived inner thoughts."

The tension between Lila and Lenu is often considered the central point of the novels, as Matteo Pericoli wrote for The Paris Review: "From a structural point of view, tension and compression often meld into each another. In this building, two volumes are interwoven by strong connecting rods, extended columns and daring beams, with one of the two seemingly suspended from the other. With its mass and swirled dynamism, the suspended volume (that we will call Lila) seems to be slipping away from the one that is holding it up (that we will call Elena) making it extend and stretch as if it was Lila that was shaping Elena and providing her with her dynamic energy, so vital to any piece of architecture."

Suzanne Berne also wrote about the relation between the pair for the LA Review of Books, commenting on how they are perceived by critics: "Some reviewers see them as two halves of female creativity — the actualized versus the potential — or as inverse sides of the feminine psyche. Others view them as sisters in arms, struggling against the hostility and brutality of a male-dominated culture, or use them to ponder the line between fiction and nonfiction in these clearly autobiographical novels. One reviewer insists they are a Faustian pair, with Lila as the "genius demon." But the real astonishment of this long, digressive, unclassifiable narrative is its portrayal of the dynamic experience of a close female friendship. A friendship, as registered through Elena, that changes page by page, sometimes sentence by sentence. And the question Ferrante finally forced me to ask is how that experience, in fiction, could feel so exalting."

According to The Guardian, this tension goes beyond the relation between Lila and Lenu, encompassing all women in the narrative: "Ferrante's subject – it is almost an obsession – is the way women are shaped, distorted and sometimes destroyed by their social milieu (and by the men around them). Voicing what can still seem unvoiceable, she delves into the darker tensions between daughters and mothers, the tug-and-pull of being a wife or a mother and wanting to retain some sense of independent self."

=== Motherhood and ambivalence ===
The series was praised for its portrayal of an intelligent young woman who finds motherhood stifling, something not often portrayed, as presented by Roxana Robinson for The New York Times: "She (Elena) has joined the intelligentsia and is about to marry into the middle class, yet her life is still rife with limitations. Her distinguished husband is narrow-minded and restrictive, and she finds motherhood numbing."

=== Class struggle ===
The novels also portray class struggle, especially in the context of Italian factory strikes of the 1970s. Writer Valerie Popp has written on the class portrayal in the novels "So I find that reading Elena Ferrante's work affords me a rare pleasure: the pleasure of recognition. Here in the United States, the working-class dimensions of Ferrante's work tend to get elided, ignored, or attenuated into something charming and "primitive" that the literary coterie—who, for the most part, are middle- or upper-class born—can admire from a distance." The novel was also praised for its social themes, showing the neighborhood's changes under the Camorra's influence, and the struggles during the 70s Lead Years in Italy: "During the struggles of the 1970s between the Communists and the Socialists she [Elena] turns to politics, only to find that the Camorra rules here too."

=== Künstlerroman ===
The novel's protagonist being called Elena invited readers to wonder how much her story has in common with the author's. As Katherine Hill writes in the Paris Review: "Most autofiction trades on the understanding that the author is just playing, or just theorizing, and not really revealing herself, but Ferrante's work invites the opposite reading."

The question was posed by reader Paolo Di Stefano to Elena Ferrante in the Italian newspaper Corriere della Sera, "how autobiographical is the story of Elena [Greco]?". Ferrante replied, in "her characteristically direct yet elusive manner, 'If by autobiography you mean drawing on one's own experience to feed an invented story, almost entirely. If instead you're asking whether I'm telling my own personal story, not at all'."

In addition, the story of becoming an author is entangled for Lenu with the two previous points: with her friendship with Lila, because it's her goal to compete with the friend, to prove herself worthy, that fuels her writing. And with class struggle because writing a successful novel was how the two of them dreamed, as little girls, of making money and escaping the neighborhood, and, in fact, how Lenu finally achieves that.

=== Naples ===
According to Sarah Begley, writing for Time magazine, the city of Naples itself is one of the main characters of the book, "portrayed in gritty detail throughout the novels." The city is portrayed in the novels as a place of violence, poverty and social unrest. Rutgers University Associate Professor Paola Gambarota has linked this portrayal of Naples to the issues the city experienced after being bombed during World War II. Ferrante portrays well known issues, such as the black markets (through such figures as the Carraci family) and the rising influence of the Camorra (through the Solara family). Gambarota writes that, "the socioeconomic situation in Naples...was worse than anywhere else" and that education was a luxury.

=== "Southern Question" ===
Another theme always present in the novel is the difference between the South and the North of Italy, and the prejudice suffered by people from the South. This is more often portrayed through the character of Elena, who goes to study and live in the North. As Pasha Malla wrote for Slate: "She [Elena] never fully identifies with Naples and its brutality, yet she remains an impostor among refined Northerners, 'the daughter of the porter with the dialect cadence of the South,' who is only 'playing the part of the cultured writer'."

== Reception ==
In 2019, The Guardian ranked My Brilliant Friend the 11th best book since 2000. The overall series was also listed in Vulture as one of the 12 "New Classics" since 2000. In 2024, the New York Times ranked the series' first installment "My Brilliant Friend" as the best book of the 21st century.

Elissa Schappel, writing for Vanity Fair, reviewed the last book of the Quartet as "This is Ferrante at the height of her brilliance." Roger Cohen wrote for the New York Review of Books: "The interacting qualities of the two women are central to the quartet, which is at once introspective and sweeping, personal and political, covering the more than six decades of the two women's lives and the way those lives intersect with Italy's upheavals, from the revolutionary violence of the leftist Red Brigades to radical feminism."

In The Guardian, it was noted the growing popularity of Ferrante, especially among writers: "Partly because her work describes domestic experiences – such as vivid sexual jealousy and other forms of shame – that are underexplored in fiction, Ferrante's reputation is soaring, especially among women (Zadie Smith, Mona Simpson and Jhumpa Lahiri are fans)".

Darrin Franich has called the novels the series of the decade, saying: "The Neapolitan Novels are the series of the decade because they are so clearly of this decade: conflicted, revisionist, desperate, hopeful, revolutionary, euphorically feminine even in the face of assaultive male corrosion."

Judith Shulevitz in The Atlantic, praised particularly how the books circle back to its start, to Lila and Lenu's childhood games, in the final installment. Maureen Corregan has also praised the ending of the novels, calling it "Perfect Devastation".

== Awards ==
- My Brilliant Friend: Longlist of the International IMPAC Dublin Literary Award.
- The Story of the Lost Child: nominated for the Strega Prize, the most prestigious Italian literary award.
- The Story of the Lost Child; nominated for the International Booker Prize, raising the question if the award could be given to an anonymous author.
- The Story of the Lost Child; won the 2016 ALTA Translation Prizes, in the category translations form Italian.

== Book covers ==
The book covers of the Neapolitan Quartet have long been criticized for their kitschness. Emily Harnett wrote for The Atlantic: "On Twitter and beyond, readers have described Ferrante's covers as "horrible," "atrocious," "utterly hideous," and as a "disservice" to her novels." The publishers have however defended the choice in an interview to Slate, claiming that "We also had the feeling that many people didn't understand the game we were playing, that of, let's say, dressing an extremely refined story with a touch of vulgarity."

== Characters ==
=== Greco family ===
- Elena (nicknamed "Lenù" or "Lenuccia") Greco (as an adult becomes a successful author)
  - two daughters, Adele ("Dede") and Elsa Airota, by husband Pietro Airota
  - one illegitimate daughter, Immacolata "Imma" Sarratore, by a later affair with Nino Sarratore
- Vittorio Greco (Elena's father, doorman at the city hall)
- Immacolata Greco (Elena's mother, housewife)
- Peppe, Gianni, and Elisa Greco (Elena's younger siblings)

=== Cerullo family ===
- Raffaella ("Lila" or "Lina") Cerullo (as an adult runs a successful computer business)
  - one son, Gennaro ("Rino"), by husband Stefano Carracci (not by Nino Sarratore, as she first thought)
  - one illegitimate daughter, Nunzia "Tina" Scanno, by Enzo Scanno
- Fernando Cerullo (Lila's father, works in a shoe shop)
- Nunzia Cerullo (Lila's mother, housewife)
- Rino Cerullo (Lila's older brother, five to seven years older than Lila, works at the family's shoe shop)
- several unnamed younger siblings of Rino and Lila

=== Sarratore family ===
- Donato Sarratore (train ticket inspector and poet)
- Lidia Sarratore (Donato's wife, housewife)
- Nino Sarratore (their eldest son, two years older than Lila and Elena, as an adult is a professor and politically active)
  - One illegitimate son, Mirko, with Silvia a university activist
  - One son, Albertino Sarratore with wife Eleonora (the daughter of a prominent Neapolitan businessman)
  - One daughter, Lidia Sarratore, by Eleonora
  - One illegitimate daughter, Immacolata "Imma" Sarratore, by a later affair with Elena Greco
- Marisa Sarratore (Nino's sister, of an age with Lila and Elena)
- Pino, Clelia, and Ciro Sarratore (younger children)

=== Carracci family ===
- Don Achille Carracci (owns and works in a grocery shop, former loan shark and black market agent)
- Maria Carracci (his wife, works at the family's grocery shop)
- Stefano Carracci (their eldest son, five to seven years older than Lila and Elena, works at the family's grocery shop)
  - one daughter, Maria Carracci, by a later affair with Ada Cappuccio
- Pinuccia Carracci (Stefano's younger sister)
- Alfonso Carracci (Stefano and Pinuccia's younger brother, of an age with Lila and Elena)

=== Solara family ===
(the neighborhood's mafia, they own a bar as well as several other businesses, legal or not)

- Silvio Solara (owner of the bar-pastry shop)
- Manuela Solara (his wife, known as a moneylender / loan shark)
- Marcello Solara (oldest brother)
  - son, Silvio Solara, by a relationship with (eventual wife) Elisa Greco
- Michele Solara (younger brother)
  - unnamed sons with wife Gigliola Spagnuolo
  - two children, by a later affair with Marisa Sarratore

=== Spagnuolo family ===
- Gigliola Spagnuolo (of an age with Lila and Elena)
- Signor Spagnuolo (her father; pastry chef)
- Rosa Spagnuolo (his wife, homemaker)
- Gigliola's younger brother

=== Peluso family ===
- Pasquale Peluso (construction worker)
- Carmela ("Carmen") Peluso (his younger sister, of an age with Lila and Elena)
- Alfredo Peluso, their father (carpenter)
- Giuseppina Peluso (his wife, homemaker)

=== Scanno family ===
- Nicola Scanno (fruit and vegetables seller)
- Assunta Scanno (his wife, fruit and vegetables seller)
- Enzo Scanno (their eldest son, as an adult runs a successful computer business with Lila)
- other children

=== Cappuccio family ===
- The late father Cappuccio
- Melina Cappuccio (the mad woman, in love with Donato Sarratore, cleans the neighborhood's buildings' staircases)
- Antonio Cappuccio (their son, works in a garage)
- Ada Cappuccio (Antonio's sister, helps her mother clean staircases, later works at the Carracci grocery shop)
- other children

=== Airota family ===
- Guido Airota (Greek literature professor)
- Adele Airota (his wife, literary critic)
- Mariarosa Airota (their daughter, history of art professor in Milan)
- Pietro Airota (their son, also a professor, and Elena's husband and the father of Elena's two older daughters)

=== Teachers ===
- Maestro Ferraro (elementary school teacher and librarian)
- Maestra Oliviero, (elementary school teacher)
  - Nella Incardo, (owns a bed and breakfast in Ischia, is the cousin of Maestra Oliviero)
- Professor Gerace (high-school teacher)
- Professor Galiani, high-school teacher.
  - Nadia Galiani (student, and daughter of Professor Galiani, was Nino's girlfriend)
  - Armando Galiani (doctor and son of Professor Galiani)
    - Has a son named Marco with wife Isabella

=== Other characters ===
- Gino
- Bruno Soccavo
- Franco Mari
- Silvia
  - Mirko, her son by Nino Sarratore

== Adaptations ==
My Brilliant Friend, a two-part, five-and-a-half-hour stage adaptation of the Neapolitan Novels, opened at the Rose Theatre, Kingston in March 2017. The play was adapted by April De Angelis, directed by Melly Still, and starred Niamh Cusack as Lenu and Catherine McCormack as Lila.

A 32-part television series, The Neapolitan Novels, is also in the works and will be co-produced by the Italian producer Wildside for Fandango Productions, with screenwriting led by the writer Francesco Piccolo. On 30 March 2017, it was announced that HBO and RAI would broadcast the first eight episodes which are an adaptation of My Brilliant Friend, the first of the four Neapolitan Novels, and they premiered on HBO on 18 November 2018.

The series was also adapted for radio, produced by Pier for BBC Radio 4 and first broadcast in July 2016.

== Bibliography ==
- L'amica geniale (2011; English translation: My Brilliant Friend, 2012). OCLC 778419313.
- Storia del nuovo cognome, L'amica geniale volume 2 (2012; English translation: The Story of a New Name, 2013). OCLC 829451619.
- Storia di chi fugge e di chi resta, L'amica geniale volume 3 (2013; English translation: Those Who Leave and Those Who Stay, 2014). OCLC 870919836.
- Storia della bambina perduta, L'amica geniale volume 4 (2014; English translation: The Story of the Lost Child, 2015). OCLC 910239891.
