= Roxana Robinson =

American novelist and biographer (born 1946)

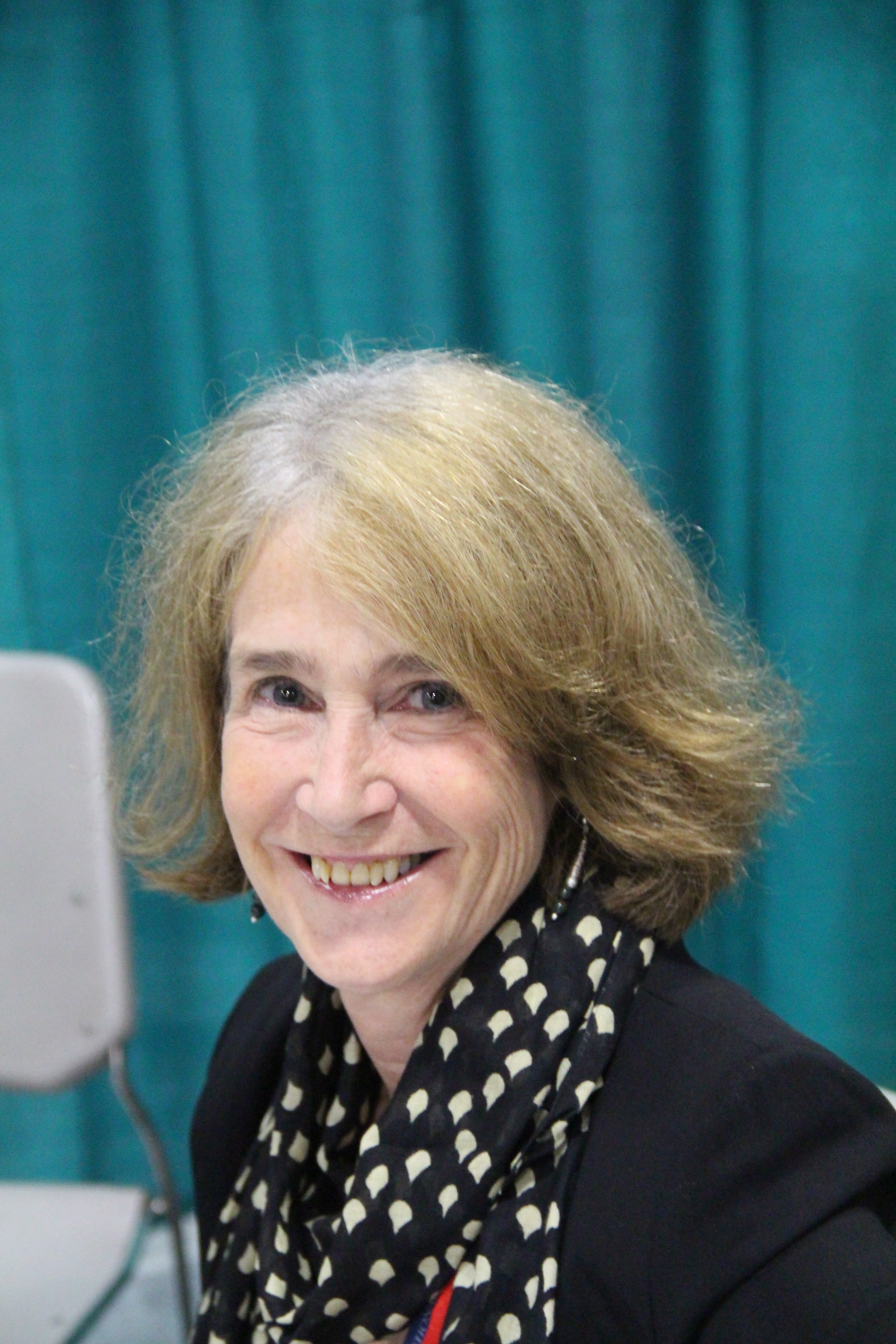
- Robinson at the 2015 National Book Festival
- Born: Roxana Barry; 30 November 1946 (age 79); Pine Mountain, Kentucky
- Education: Buckingham Friends School; The Shipley School
- Alma mater: University of Michigan
- Spouse: Hamilton Robinson
- Writing career
- Genres: Novelist; biographer

Roxana Robinson (née Barry; born 30 November 1946) is an American novelist and biographer whose fiction explores the complexity of familial bonds and fault lines. She is best known for her 2008 novel, Cost, which was named one of the Five Best Novels of the Year by The Washington Post. She is also the author of Georgia O'Keeffe: A Life, and has written widely on American art and issues pertaining to ecology and the environment.

== Life and work ==
Robinson was born in Pine Mountain, Kentucky, and raised in New Hope, Pennsylvania, the child of educators Stuyvesant Barry and Alice Scoville. She is also the great-great-granddaughter of social reformer Henry Ward Beecher. She graduated from Buckingham Friends School, in Lahaska, and from The Shipley School, in Bryn Mawr. She studied writing at Bennington College with Bernard Malamud, and received a B.A. degree in English literature from the University of Michigan. She worked in the American painting department at Sotheby's and wrote about American art until she began to successfully publish short fiction in the 1980s.

Equally skilled in both long and short form fiction, Robinson is the author of four novels, three-story collections and a biography. Her work has appeared in The New Yorker, Harper's, The Atlantic, and Best American Short Stories, and been widely anthologized and broadcast on National Public Radio. Four of her works have been chosen as Notable Books of the Year by The New York Times, and Cost won the Maine Fiction Award and was long-listed for the Dublin Impac Prize for Fiction. She was named a Literary Lion by the New York Public Library, served as a Trustee of PEN American Center and is currently president of the Authors Guild. She has received fellowships from the National Endowment for the Arts, the MacDowell Colony, and the Guggenheim Foundation.

Robinson has taught at Wesleyan University, the University of Houston and at the New School. Since 1997, she has taught at the Wesleyan Writers' Conference, and is currently teaching in the Hunter College MFA Program.

Robinson is also a biographer and scholar of nineteenth, and early twentieth-century American art. Her articles have appeared in Arts, ARTnews, and Art & Antiques, as well as in exhibition catalogues for the Metropolitan Museum of Art and the Katonah Museum of Art and others. Her biography of Georgia O'Keeffe was deemed by Calvin Tomkins, of The New Yorker, "without question the best book written about O'Keeffe", and named a New York Times Notable Book. Robinson lectures frequently on Georgia O'Keeffe, and appeared in the BBC documentary on the artist.

She reviews books for The New York Times and The Washington Post and her essays have appeared in The New York Times, Harper's, Vogue, Real Simple and More. She has also written about travel for The New York Times, Travel and Leisure and elsewhere.

Robinson is passionate about environmental concerns, explored in her novel Sweetwater, and has published numerous op-eds in the Boston Globe, International Herald Tribune, and the Philadelphia Inquirer. She has also been a guest blogger for the Natural Resources Defense Council. She also writes about gardening for publications such as House and Garden, Horticulture, and Fine Gardening. Her garden is listed in the Garden Conservancy Open Days, and has been written about in The New York Times, House and Garden, Traditional Homes, The Atlantic, and Gardens Illustrated. She serves on the council of the Maine Coast Heritage Trust, which promotes the conservation of natural places statewide.

She lives in New York, Maine and Connecticut with her husband. Her daughter is a painter whose work appeared on both the hardcover and paperback editions of Cost.

== Critical reception ==
Hailed as "one of our best writers" by Jonathan Yardley of The Washington Post, and "John Cheever’s heir apparent" by the New York Times Book Review, Robinson has also been said, by TIME, to be in the "august company" of Edith Wharton, Louis Auchincloss and Henry James.

With Cost, Robinson moved into a larger arena, and, as critic Ron Charles of the Washington Post has said, she "has crept into corners of human experience [that] each of us is terrified to approach ... the implacable tragedies that shred our sense of how the world should work". In a New York Times interview on the extensive research she did, Robinson said, “'Cost' has a larger reach than my previous books, both in terms of emotional risk and experience. Alzheimer's and heroin addiction are things I found both very threatening and compelling. They seemed like things I needed to explore."

Spotlighted for her short fiction in the New York Times Book Review, Robinson compared writing a story to "like doing a cliff dive, the kind that only works when the wave hits just right. You stand on top, poised and fearful, looking at what lies below: you must start your dive when the wave has withdrawn, and there's nothing beneath you but sand and stone. You take a deep breath and throw yourself over, hoping that, by the time you hit, the wave will be back, wild and churning, and full of boiling energy. It's kind of terrifying. It's unbelievably fun."

Robinson has written introductions to The Best Early Stories of F. Scott Fitzgerald, A Matter of Prejudice and Other Stories by Kate Chopin, and a forthcoming edition of the English novelist Elizabeth Taylor's A Game of Hide and Seek. She edited and wrote the introduction to The New York Stories of Edith Wharton, published by NYRB Classics, as well the introduction to Wharton's The Old Maid: The Fifties, published by Modern Library Classics. Robinson was also a guest on the recent WAMC/Northeast Public Radio program "American Icons", on which she discussed House of Mirth. She is also on the Advisory Council at The Mount, Wharton's historic home in Lenox, Massachusetts.

Commenting on her affinity with Wharton, Robinson notes, "Wharton and I come from similar backgrounds. I grew up with the rules that governed her: emotions were to be strictly controlled, pain was not to be acknowledged, and the rules of decorum were to be obeyed. I’ve always been fascinated by her unblinking exegesis of all this, the way you are when someone breaks the rules, the way you are when you read something and think, "What? Are you allowed to write about this?” Wharton wrote about her world in a way that made it possible for me – and for all of us who come after her – to go into our own worlds still further, and to tease out the innermost reaches of pain and passion from the decorous woven fabric of our lives".

Her work is increasingly used for teaching purposes, and the University of Connecticut has taught a course called, "The Works of Roxana Robinson".

Robinson was a finalist for the 2013 Nona Balakian Citation for Excellence in Reviewing given by the National Book Critics Circle.

== Works ==
=== Novels ===
- Leaving. W. W. Norton. 2024. ISBN 978-0-861-54774-6.
- Dawson's Fall. Farrar, Straus and Giroux. 2019. ISBN 9780374135218
- Sparta: A Novel. Farrar, Straus and Giroux. 4 June 2013. ISBN 978-0-374-70957-0.
- Cost (Farrar, Straus & Giroux, 2008)
- Sweetwater. Thorndike Press. 2003. ISBN 978-0-7862-5648-8.
- This is My Daughter: A Novel. Touchstone. 16 September 1999. ISBN 978-0-684-86436-5.
- Summer Light (Viking, 1987)

=== Collected fiction ===
- A Perfect Stranger: And Other Stories. Random House Publishing Group. 18 December 2007. ISBN 978-0-307-43043-4.
- Asking for love and other stories. Random House. 12 March 1996. ISBN 978-0-679-43902-8.
- A glimpse of scarlet and other stories. E. Burlingame Books. 1991. ISBN 978-0-06-016331-0.

=== Nonfiction ===
- Georgia O'Keeffe: A Life. UPNE. 1989. p. 572. ISBN 978-0-87451-906-8.

== Sources ==
- The New York Times, "The Writer’s Notebook: Roxana Robinson"
- Publishers Weekly, "Roxana Robinson: Old Money, New Families"
