= Poetry of Czesław Miłosz =

Polish-American Nobel laureate for literature

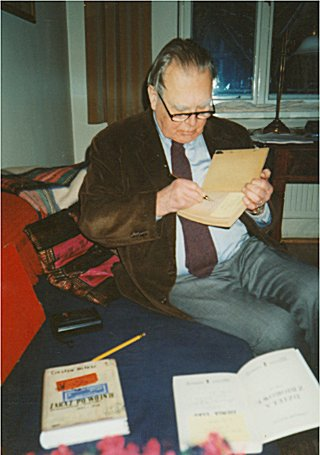
Miłosz working in 1986

Czesław Miłosz was a Polish-American literary figure who won the 1980 Nobel Prize in Literature and is considered the greatest modern Polish writer.: Miłosz's transition from Polish-language texts to English reflects his tumultuous political background. Miłosz passed, like Poland itself, through the Russian Empire, the post-war Polish-Lithuanian War, the Nazi occupation of Poland, the Warsaw Uprising (during which Miłosz wrote and edited for the Polish resistance), and post-war communism under Stalin. During this final period, Miłosz worked as a diplomat in Paris, where he eventually defected and received asylum in France. In 1960, he moved to the United States to work as a visiting lecturerer at the University of California, Berkeley where he met many of the poets with whom he would later collaborate to translate his poetry into English. He lived and worked in the U.S. until returning to Poland in 2000 before his eventual death in 2004.

Miłosz's work enjoyed wide recognition in Poland (both before and after his defection) despite governmental disavowal and state-sanctioned subversion of his writing. Miłosz's receipt of the Nobel Prize in 1980 marked the beginning of his wider international fame. Publishers issued reprints of his prose works, but the public at-large tended to treat his poetry as a monolith until the mid-1980s when scholars, some of them students of Miłosz, published specific treatments of his poetry.

Miłosz's writing (specifically his poetry) evolved over the course of his career from the political surrealism of the Catastrophists into writing broadly interested in metaphysics and polyphony. The wartime violence of the early and mid 20th century in Poland, particularly the extreme violence of World War II, deeply and irrevocably imprinted on Miłosz, especially in his earliest writings.

== Background ==
Miłosz became actively involved with literature as a law student at the University of Vilnius where he studied from 1930-1934. In 1931 he helped found the short-lived poetry group Żagary (Lithuanian for "brushwood") alongside likeminded left-leaning poets, such as Jerzy Zagórski, Teodor Bujnicki, and Jerzy Putrament. These three poets have been subsequently labeled as the Catastrophist school of poets, defined by their surreal, dreamlike content and apocalyptic anxieties regarding the future of Europe and the Earth. The young Miłosz held and often vocalized strong opinions that the work of Żagary should be foremost of social and political import rather than self-consciously formal and preoccupied with aesthetics.

In 1931, Miłosz briefly visited Paris where he met his cousin Oscar Miłosz who worked for the French-Lithuanian delegation and who became a mentor to Miłosz over the next years until his death in 1939. Miłosz published Poem About Congealed Time in 1933, his first major collection, followed by the much less political Three Winters in 1936. This second collection adopted a much more mystical (what scholars would later call "pantheistic") quality; this change in focus was likely a product of his continued friendship with Oscar Miłosz who was vocally anti-modernist. Oscar believed that the decadence of the early 20th century and its over-emphasis on individualism had moved contemporary writing away from the metaphysics and collective awareness necessary for truly great poetry.

Following his graduation in 1934 and the informal dissolution of Żagary, Miłosz spent a year in Paris where he was introduced into several of the then-major Parisian artistic cohorts. Following his return, he began work for the Vilnius (Wilno) Broadcast Station as a full time commentator and reporter on literary affairs. The publication of Three Winters in 1936 garnered attention for the young Miłosz within Poland's literary circles, and Miłosz's name began to appear in notable public venues. As political tensions rose in the following months and years, Miłosz maintained his left-leaning sympathies but gradually found himself increasingly disenchanted with the Polish-Communist movement. Among his complaints was a rising anti-intellectual trend against art. In 1939, he wrote,

"Reading articles by young Marxists, one suspects that they really wish for this period to herald a future which sees the total demise of art and artistry. They are preoccupied solely with sniffing out betrayal and class desertion, and are so zealous in poking around to establish whether someone had written 'God' with a capital 'g'. In this great revisionist utopia, there will be nothing left to read except a few books by Wanda Wasilewska."

Despite his disavowal of the mainstream Polish-communist movement, Miłosz was labeled a communist sympathizer (probably due to his engagement with Jewish and Belarusian radio guests) by nationalist elements within the Wilno station, and he felt compelled to leave his position. In 1937, he moved to Warsaw to work for Polish Radio. He had little free time, but Miłosz was successful in his position, and he graduated from relative poverty into financially comfortable straits. The time-demand of his work frustrated his art, as did his opinion of Warsaw which he called "a Babylon of depravity.". In 1938, Miłosz visited Kaunas where he met Juozas Keliuotis, Bolesław Miciński, and Józef Czechowicz. His friendship with these three reaffirmed and deepened the Catholic scaffolding of his aesthetic framework as well as initiated an interest in T.S. Eliot (who he began to translate), William Blake, Emanuel Swedenborg, and Joachim Boehme.

It was also during this period of time that Miłosz met Janina (Janka) Dłuska who would become, in the near future, his wife (though she was married at the time). The confluence of these factors in 1938-1939 - his new and influential friendships, his growing affection for the woman to whom he would be loyally bound for half a century, the intensifying animus prescient to the start of World War II - prompted a fundamental change in Miłosz. Miłosz's misanthropy (he had theretofore thought of humans as "beasts") softened into a deep sympathy for individual people ("small souls") lost or forgotten within enormous political apparatuses. In 1938, he published in quick succession two articles, "Almost the Dusk of the Gods" and "The Lie of Today's Poetry," which argued that poets had scrubbed all the humanity from their art by refusing to reveal their inner life and by being too concerned with art for art's sake. Miłosz viewed art that was only interested in itself as unethical, negligent, and self-defeating, and he held that an artist had a fundamental, ontological obligation to engage directly with the human condition.

Over the course of World War II, Miłosz's poetry evolved toward "poetic directness," a new poetic ethic in which the poet which was sovereign of the expectations of the reader and committed to providing the reader wisdom as the poet saw it. Under this ethos, Miłosz produced The World: Naive Poems, a cycle of twenty poems. These poems, in contrast to his earlier work, were all rhymed with eight lines of eleven syllables. Miłosz's concerns for the moral state of his country grew following the end of the war. The influx of refugees into Kraków (200,000 people at the beginning of the war up to 500,000 after its end), where Miłosz was living at the time, brought with it a rise in crime. Murder and rape were common in the city. During this period, Miłosz worked as a writer and editor within the newly reformed Writer's Union, but he felt a heightening desire to leave Poland for the west.

In 1945, Miłosz applied for and received a diplomatic appointment. He travelled to London for five weeks where he met T.S. Eliot who gave Miłosz permission to publish his translation of The Waste Land without paying royalties, and the two began a friendship. Following his travel to London, Miłosz was sent to New York City. Miłosz felt an immanent unease and distaste for American excess and apparent spiritual bankruptcy. During this stay, Miłosz began a dedicated study of American Literature, and he openly admired the spare quality of American diction, something he would subsequently adopt. In addition to excelling in his diplomatic position, Miłosz became actively involved in organizing and attending events related to the American arts community.

In 1949, Miłosz returned to Poland and found himself increasingly concerned with the political situation. Unable to conceal his reticence for the state of the Polish government, Miłosz was reassigned to Paris by the Ministry of Foreign Affairs at the request of the Paris ambassador to prevent Miłosz's potential defection to the United States.

== Poetry ==
=== Evolution ===
In 1984, the poet Robert Hass (a student of Miłosz and one of his preeminent English translators) proposed a rough division of Miłosz's work into five stages (Hass applied this division to both Miłosz's poetry and prose, though only the poetry is listed here)

1. Catastrophism, 1933-1939 — defined by a soft surrealism and less intense apocalyptic tone than his peers in Zagary as well as a contradictory personal identity.

Poem on Frozen Time (1933)
Three Winters (1936)

2. War, 1939-1945 — stripped-down writing which defers to a necessary politicism.

Rescue (1945)

3. Post-War, 1945-1962 — varied in style and content, and suffered from state censorship in Poland. Interested in the overlap between Christianity and dialectical materialism and takes issue with the idea of historical necessity. Strongly influenced by Simone Weil.

Daylight (1955)
A Treatise on Poetry (1957)

4. Late France, Early California, 1962-1969 — Miłosz moves to America in 1960 but continues to publish in Paris; maintains an overt affinity for the ideas of Weil, specifically with the idea that "contradiction is the lever of transcendence". This stage of poetry widely varies in form.

King Popiel (1962)
Bobo's Metamorphosis (1964)
Poems (1967)
City Without a Name (1969)

5. California, 1969-1987 — Continues to experiment with a broad array of forms. This writing features "ontological vertigo," or the refusal to resolve the existential questions that the writing introduces.

Selected Poems (1973)
Where the Sun Rises (1974)
Bells in Winter (1978)
Collected Poems (1981)

After his 1980 Nobel Prize, Miłosz continued to write until his death in 2004. Of the ten collections he wrote in Polish during this time, seven have been translated into English.

Unattainable Earth (1984)
Facing the River (1994)
Road-side Dog (1997)
This (2000)
Second Space (2002)
Orpheus and Eurydice (2003)
Selected and Last Poems (2006)

=== Themes ===
Miłosz's poems perennially reflect the pain and destruction of his wartime experience, but they also orbit Miłosz's concern about the absence of moral law in his contemporary landscape.

==== Pantheism and Christianity ====
Much of Miłosz's poetry demonstrates a tension between Pantheistic and Christian (specifically Catholic) worldviews. The brief school of Catastrophism relayed a particularly apocalyptic type of Pantheism which Miłosz later attributed to immaturity, especially in stark contrast with the subsequent homebound cataclysms of WWII Poland. In his later work, Miłosz reconciled these two schools of belief via Manichaeism which he encountered as part of his enduring affinity for the writings of Simone Weil.

The duality of Miłosz's Pantheistic-Christian ontology largely manifests in his depictions of the natural world which oscillate between treatment of the Earth as a source of beauty and instruction and flinching from it as a site of random violence and the assimilation of the individual into irrelevancy. Of this contradiction, Miłosz wrote,

"When my guardian angel (who resides in an internalized external space) is triumphant, the earth looks precious to me and I live in ecstasy; I am perfectly at ease because I am surrounded by a divine protection, my health is good, I feel within me the rush of a mighty rhythm, my dreams are of magically rich landscapes, and I forget about death, because whether it comes in a month or five years it will be done as it was decreed, not by the God of the philosophers but by the God of Abraham, Isaac, and Jacob. When the devil triumphs, I am appalled when I look at trees in bloom as they blindly repeat every spring what has been willed by the law of natural selection; the sea evokes in me a battlegound of monstrous, antediluvian crustaceans, I am oppressed by the randomness and absurdity of my individual existence, and I fell excluded from the world's rhythm, cast up from it, a piece of detritus, and then the terror: my life is over, I won't get another, only death now."

==== History ====
Miłosz's poetry treats history as one of the only practical mechanisms by which individual people or groups can materialize out of otherwise indiscernible and impersonal populations. In 1968, Miłosz insisted that,

". . . one can get at man only obliquely, only through the constant masquerade that is the extension of himself at a given moment, through his historical existence."

Miłosz's poetry contains this type of historical burden, and Miłosz maintained over his whole body of work the need to engage with the particulars of historical context in order to properly sketch humanity. Miłosz often uses nature, broadly, in his poetry as a vehicle to describe his philosophies of history. Evolutionary nature proceeds by virtue of "necessity" which serves as a shorthand for "necessary violence," a type of the violence exacted by the Nazis and Stalinists in WWII. This violence both manifests and extinguishes individuals.

=== Form ===
The form of Miłosz's poetry can be described, generally, as free verse. Translators have noted that Miłosz's poetry in Polish relies on a cadenced polyphony that is lost when translated into English, as is Miłosz's ability to find and deploy forgotten Polish diction to the end of invoking a specific Polish history.

== Works cited ==
- Franaszek, Andrzej (2017). Parker (ed. and trans.), Aleksandra; Parker (ed. and trans.), Michael (eds.). Miłosz: a biography. Cambridge, Massachusetts: Belknap Press of Harvard University Press. ISBN 9780674495043.
- Nathan, Leonard; Quinn, Arthur (1991). The poet's work: an introduction to Czeslaw Milosz. Cambridge, Mass: Harvard University Press. ISBN 0674689704.
- Vendler, Helen (1988). The Music of What Happens: Poems, Poets, Critics. Cambridge, Mass. London: Harvard university press. p. 209. ISBN 0674591526.
