= 1980 Nobel Prize in Literature =

Award

- Czesław Miłosz
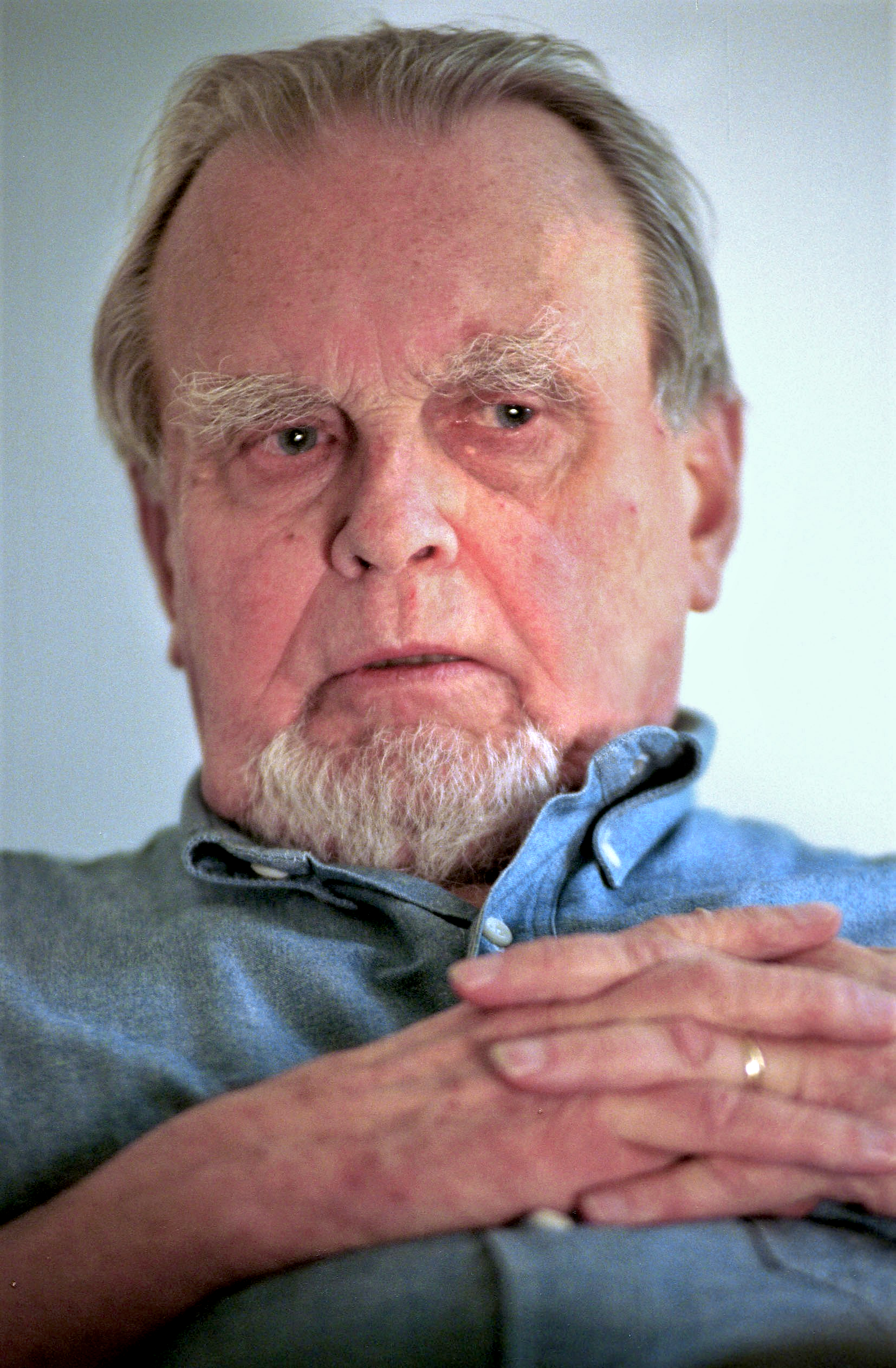
- "who with uncompromising clear-sightedness voices man's exposed condition in a world of severe conflicts"
- Date: 9 October 1980 (announcement); 10 December 1980 (ceremony)
- Location: Stockholm, Sweden
- Presented by: Swedish Academy
- First award: 1901
- Website: Official website

The 1980 Nobel Prize in Literature was awarded the Polish-American poet and prose writer Czesław Miłosz (1911–2004) "who with uncompromising clear-sightedness voices man's exposed condition in a world of severe conflicts."

== Laureate ==
Czesław Miłosz was primarily a poet. In 1934, he released his first poetry collection, Poemat o czasie zastygłym ("A Poem on Frozen Time"). His early works frequently have a sense of impending doom, but as time went on, he softened the worldly image he painted. His best-known work, the non-fiction Zniewolony umysł ("The Captive Mind", 1953), explores the effects of an oppressive system on four authors. Miłosz fought against being branded a political writer and maintained that his works addressed eternal questions like life and death, faith and doubt, and good and evil. His other celebrated poetry collections include Ocalenie ("Rescue", 1945), Traktat poetycki ("A Treatise on Poetry", 1957), Gdzie wschodzi słońce i kędy zapada ("Where the Sun Rises and Where it Sets", 1974).

== Reactions ==
In 1980, while the Swedish Academy kept the names of the nominees a closely guarded secret, among the rumored strong contenders were V. S. Naipaul (awarded in 2001), Norman Mailer, Joyce Carol Oates, Graham Greene, Doris Lessing (awarded in 2007), Nadine Gordimer (awarded in 1991), Günter Grass (awarded in 1999), Mario Vargas Llosa (awarded in 2010) and Jorge Luis Borges.

The awarding of the Nobel prize to Czesław Miłosz coincided with the rise of the Solidarity movement in Poland. Many assumed that Miłosz had been awarded for political reasons and the Swedish Academy was charged with political opportunism. Miłosz had however been selected by the Nobel committee long before the events in Poland and the Academy emphasized Miłosz's literary achievements.

The official Polish reactions to the prize decision were initially reserved, but was eventually acknowledged as an honour for Polish culture and literature.

Though largely unknown before he was awarded, the prize decision was well received and Miłosz was by many said to be an excellent choice by the Swedish Academy.
