= Na brzegu rzeki =

Poetry Collection

Na brzegu rzeki is a poetry collection by Czesław Miłosz, a Polish and American poet, prose writer, translator and diplomat. It was first published in 1994. An English translation by Robert Hass, Facing the River, was published in 1995 by Ecco Press. The main themes of the collection are old age and reminiscences of the author's pre-war youth in rural Lithuania. The river of the title is the Nevėžis in the Issa Valley near Šeteniai where Miłosz grew up. His 1955 novel The Issa Valley (later adapted into film) was named for the same place.

== Partial contents ==
- 'At A Certain Age'
- 'Biography of an Artist'
- 'Realism'
- 'One More Contradiction'
- 'A Human Fly'
- 'A Polka-Dot Dress'
- 'Plato's Dialogues'
