= Hymn of the Pearl (disambiguation) =

The Hymn of the Pearl is a passage of the apocryphal Acts of Thomas.

Hymn of the Pearl or Hymn on the Pearl may also refer to:

- Hymns on the Pearl (Madrāšē al-Marganītā), a collection of five hymns within the larger cycle known as the Hymns on Faith by Ephrem the Syrian
- Hymn o Perle, a 1982 poetry collection by Czesław Miłosz
