= Światło dzienne =

1953 poetry collection by Czesław Miłosz

- by Czesław Miłosz
- Country: France
- Language: Polish
- Publication date: 1953; 73 years ago

Światlo dzienne (Daylight) is a poetry collection by Czesław Miłosz. It was first published in Paris in 1953.

The first volume of Miłosz's poetry published in exile includes works mostly published in the years 1945-1950 in national magazines (Odrodzenie, Nowa Polska, Warszawa, Twórczość, Zeszyty Wrocławskie and Nowa Kultura), and from 1951 in the Paris-based Kultura. The poet explains in the introduction:

Tytuł ma podwójne znaczenie: Jest tu sporo rzeczy, których nie mogłem w Polsce opublikować; poza tym poezja jest dla mnie raczej sprawą dnia niż nocy.
The title has a double meaning: There are a lot of things here that I couldn't publish in Poland; besides, poetry is for me a matter of the day rather than of the night.

The volume has been described as consisting of "political poetry deeply engaged with history". It has also been discussed in the context of Miłosz's experiences in the United States, and his thoughts about it.
