= Andrzej Miłosz =

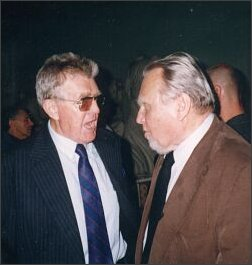
- Andrzej Miłosz, and his brother Czesław Miłosz
- Born: 19 September 1917; Vilnius
- Died: 21 September 2002 (aged 85); Warsaw
- Occupations: journalist, translator of literature and film subtitles, documentary-film maker
- Spouses: Hanna Goliszewska, Grażyna Strumiłło-Miłosz
- Children: Joanna Miłosz-Piekarska
- Relatives: Czesław Miłosz
- Honours: Righteous Among the Nations

Andrzej Miłosz (19 September 1917, Vilnius – 21 September 2002, Warsaw) was a Polish journalist, translator of literature and film subtitles, and documentary-film maker.

== Biography ==
During World War II he was a member of the anti-Nazi resistance, soldier of the Home Army (AK) and ZWZ. He organized the first courier routes in Wilno.

He has been honored by Israel's Yad Vashem memorial to the Holocaust as one of the Righteous among the Nations.

== Family ==
He was the brother of Nobel-winning poet and writer, Czesław Miłosz. He had a daughter, Joanna Milosz (also known as Joanna Milosz-Piekarska).

== Books ==
- Uśmiech Bez Parandży, 1973 [with Grażyna Miłosz]
- Kaukaz, 1979 [with Grażyna Miłosz]
- Kaukaz i Zakaukazie. Mały przewodnik turystyczny, 1981 [with Grażyna Miłosz]

== Films ==
- 2000 - Wilno Milosza ;
- 2000 - Przysnil Mi Sie Sen Powrotu ;
- 1999 - Henio (a film about Henryk Blaszczyk, whose disappearance sparked the Kielce pogrom) ;
- 1999 - Pogrom - Kielce 1946 ;
- 1998 - Takie Ze Mnie Dziwadlo ;
- 1997 - Wizy Zycia ( Consul Sugihara and visas for life ) ;
- 1994 - Krwia i Rymem ( By Blood and Verse ) ;
- 1965 - Ludzie z Nordu ;
- 1960 - Na Gruzach Dawnych Kultur ;
- 1958 - Miedzy Morzem Srodziemnym a Czerwnonym (Notatnik Izraelski)
