= Trzy zimy =

- by Czesław Miłosz
- Language: Polish
- Publication date: 1936; 90 years ago

Trzy zimy (Three Winters) is an early poetry collection by Czesław Miłosz. It was first published in 1936.

Miłosz described the volume as his debut, although it has also been described by scholars of his work as his second collection. Polish literary critic Stanisław Barańczak noted that "the historic significance of this famous collection has increased remarkably over the course of time", noting it was already critically acclaimed in 1936, and that "in many ways [it] ushered a new epoch in modern Polish poetry". Likewise, another Polish literary scholar, Andrzej Niewiadomski, noted that importance of this volume "has been repeatedly emphasized".
