= Orfeusz i Eurydyka =

Poetry collection by Czesław Miłosz

Orfeusz i Eurydyka (Orpheus and Eurydice) is a poetry collection by Czesław Miłosz. It was first published in 2003 in Polish and translated same year to English, German and Swedish.

Like many of Miłosz's volumes of poetry, it is named after the key poem in the volume (first published in 2002 in Tygodnik Powszechny, this one inspired by the Ancient Greek myth of Orpheus and Eurydice. The poem is also a reply to Rainer Maria Rilke poem Orpheus, Euridike, Hermes. The poem is a reflection on the death of Miłosz's wife.
