= Dalsze okolice =

Dalsze okolice is a poetry collection by Czesław Miłosz. It was first published in 1991.

The collection has been subject to scholarly studies in the context of religion and mysticism.
