= Wiersze ostatnie =

Wiersze ostatnie (Last poems) is a poetry collection by Czesław Miłosz. It was first published posthumously in 2006, two years after the poet's death. Polish literary scholar, Stanisław Stabro, noted that the volume represents belongs in a collection of "late verse of the great masters" and "brings together texts that highlight the author’s spiritual, artistic and biographical experience". Małgorzata Gajak-Toczek noted that the collection marks the culmination of many themes and motives that Miłosz has tackled throughout his life.

Another Polish scholar, Marek Bernacki, noted that the poem O zbawieniu (On salvation) contained with in "has a form of poetic minitreaty" and "can be regarded as the masterpiece of a lyric of vanitas".
