= Nieobjęta ziemia =

1984 poetry collection by Czesław Miłosz

- by Czesław Miłosz
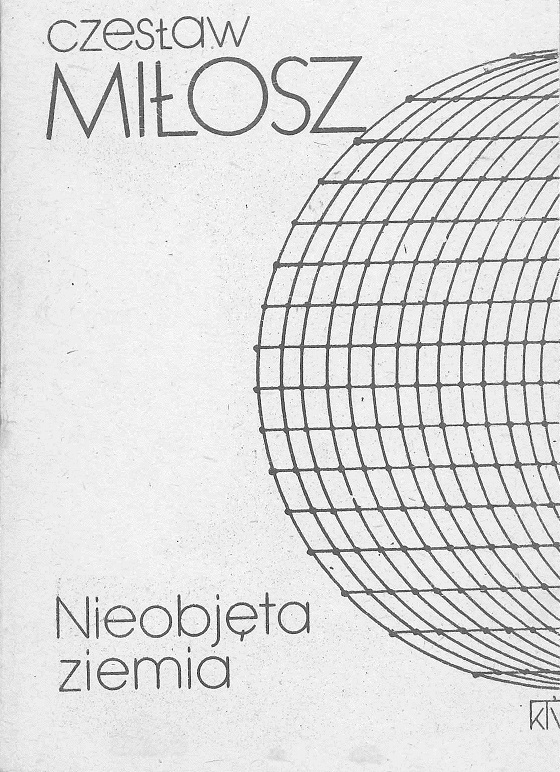
- Translator: Robert Hass
- Language: Polish
- Publication date: 1984; 42 years ago
- Published in English: 1986; 40 years ago

Nieobjeta ziemia ("Unattainable Earth") is a poetry collection, together with prose, aphorisms, letters and fragments, by Nobel Prize-winning Polish writer Czesław Miłosz. It was first published in 1984. It was translated into English by the author and Robert Hass in 1986.
