= Juozas Urbšys =

Lithuanian diplomat (1896–1991)

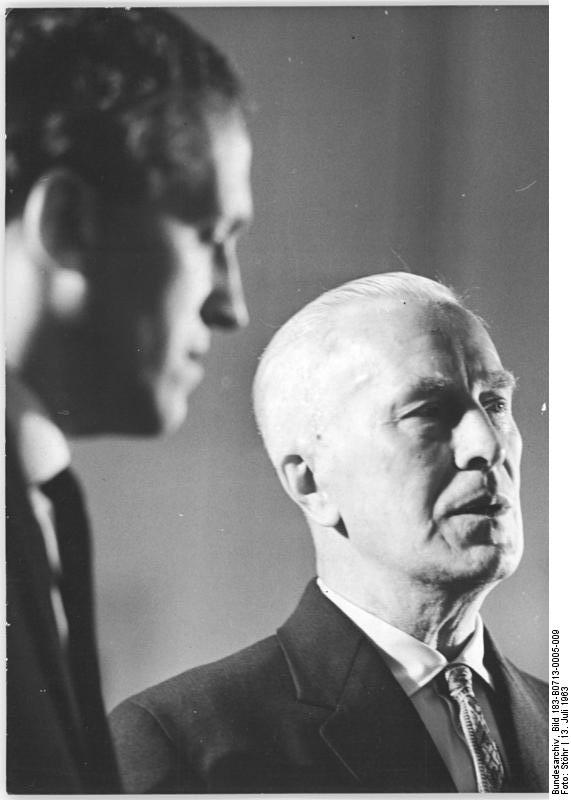

Minister of Foreign Affairs of Lithuania
- In office 5 December 1938 – 16 June 1940
- President: Antanas Smetona
- Prime Minister: Vladas Mironas; Jonas Černius; Antanas Merkys
- Preceded by: Stasys Lozoraitis
- Succeeded by: Stasys Lozoraitis (as Chief of Diplomacy)

Personal details
- Born: 29 February 1896 Šeteniai, Kėdainiai District, Russian Empire (now Lithuania)
- Died: 30 April 1991 (aged 95) Kaunas, Lithuania
- Resting place: Petrašiūnai Cemetery, Kaunas
- Citizenship: Lithuanian
- Spouse: Marija Urbšienė-Mašiotaitė
- Education: Riga Polytechnical Institute; Chuhuiv Military School
- Occupation: Diplomat, politician, military officer, translator

Military service
- Allegiance: (Russian Empire) Imperial Russian Army (Lithuania) Lithuanian Army
- Years of service: 1916–1918; 1918–1922
- Rank: Captain
- Battles/wars: World War I Lithuanian Wars of Independence

Juozas Urbšys (29 February 1896 – 30 April 1991) was a prominent interwar Lithuanian diplomat, the last head of foreign affairs in independent interwar Lithuania, and a translator. He served in the military between 1916 and 1922 and then joined the Lithuanian Ministry of Foreign Affairs. In 1938, Urbšys was named its head and served in that position until Lithuania's occupation in 1940. Urbšys was imprisoned by the Soviet authorities in 1940 and deported to Siberia, where he spent the next 13 years in various prisons. Urbšys died in 1991, having lived long enough to see Lithuania's independence restored, and was buried in Petrašiūnai Cemetery, Kaunas.

== Biography ==
Juozas Urbšys was born on 29 February 1896 in Šeteniai, a village north of Kėdainiai. In 1907, Urbšys attended a school in Panevėžys, graduating in 1914. Soon afterwards, he pursued his education in Riga, Latvia. The outbreak of World War I interrupted his studies, and he enlisted in the army in 1916. A few years later, Urbšys completed his education at Chuguyevo Military School (Russian: Чугуево, now Chuhuiv in Ukraine), returning to Lithuania in 1918 after Lithuania re-established its independence. He continued to serve in the Lithuanian military until 1922.

After joining the foreign service, Urbšys worked in Berlin, Germany, from 1922 to 1927. His next assignment was in Paris, France, a post he held until 1932. Urbšys was then named Lithuanian Minister Extraordinary and Plenipotentiary to Latvia, although he did not hold that position for long. In 1934, he was appointed the head of the political department in the Foreign Affairs Ministry. In 1938, he became the Lithuanian Minister of Foreign Affairs. Urbšys's service in this capacity coincided with significant international developments.

Rumors arose in 1939 that Germany would attempt to recover the Baltic Sea port city of Memel from Lithuania (part of the Memelland region, the city and its surrounding area had until 1919 been part of the German province of East Prussia), which Lithuania had illegally invaded in January 1923. Urbšys had been representing Lithuania during the coronation of Pope Pius XII in Rome on 12 March; while returning to Lithuania, he stopped in Berlin in an attempt to clarify the rumours. On 20 March, Ribbentrop, the German Foreign Minister, met with Urbšys. Ribbentrop stated that the explosive situation in Memel could not continue "and suggested the Lithuanian Government send plenipotentiaries to Berlin in order to reach an agreement between the two countries on it." Urbšys said he "Would inform his government at once." Urbšys relayed the conversation to the Lithuanian government the following day. While a clear deadline was not given, Lithuania was told to reach a decision as soon as possible. Urbšys said "that minor clashes could occur at any time" and that he would like to have a definite time limit set. Ribbentrop replied that "matters in Lithuania were beyond our control" and that he could set no time limit but suggested that plenipotentiaries be sent to Germany as soon as possible.

At 9 p.m. that night, the Secretary of State in the German Foreign Office, Ernst von Weizsäcker, summarised the Ribbontrop-Urbšys conversation in a telegram to the German Legation at Kaunas and instructed the Minister there to "request toward noon tomorrow, Tuesday, you call on the Foreign Minister referring to this conversation, and ask him point blank when the plenopotentiaries will arrive in Berlin." The following day, he telephoned Minister Zechlin at Kaunas saying "there is absolutely no time to lose. Developments might otherwise take a serious turn. We expect the Lithuanian delegation to come here by special plane tomorrow during the day. This will be in everyone's best interests." On March 21, the Lithuanian Council of Ministers advised the parliament of its decision to settle the Memel problem by ceding the territory to Germany. That day, the Lithuanian delegation left Kaunas for Berlin at 2 p.m, led by Urbšys. On March 22, a false additional statement was added to the conversation communiqué by Urbšys, which had been read to the Lithuanian Council of Ministers, regarding the conversation of March 20.

That night, Weizsacker telephoned Minister Zechlin at Kaunas and said that "this very night the government must retract the statement it has just issued; it must disclaim it" and stick to the official version. Without any material international support, Lithuania had no choice but to cave in. On March 23, the Lithuanian delegation signed the Treaty returning the Memel Territory to German sovereignty. Some Lithuanians characterized the acceptance as a "necessary evil" that preserved its independence and hoped it was merely a temporary retreat.

Another major diplomatic development occurred in 1939. During the course of a visit to the Soviet Union, Urbšys met with Vyacheslav Molotov, Chairman of the Council of People's Commissars and the People's Commissar for Foreign Affairs. Joseph Stalin joined the group soon afterwards. During the discussion, a draft of a mutual assistance pact was presented, which resulted in the stationing of Red Army troops in Lithuania. The city of Vilnius and its surrounding region, which had been annexed by Poland in 1920, were returned to Lithuania. However, after about one year, the Soviet authorities presented an ultimatum that ended Lithuania's independence. Urbšys's career as foreign minister ended in 1940. Soviet authorities sent him initially to a prison in Tambov; he was later moved to prisons in Saratov, Ivanov, and elsewhere. Of his 13 years in prison, 11 were spent in solitary confinement. He was released in 1954 without the right to live in what was now the Lithuanian SSR. He was allowed to return to Lithuania in 1956.

Urbšys continued to make his living by translating French works into Lithuanian. He regained notability after publishing his memoirs in 1988, a work described as one of the first to address Lithuanian history under Soviet rule. After Lithuania again regained its independence, Urbšys was named an honorary citizen of Kėdainiai (in 1990) and Kaunas (1991). His health was frail, preventing him from fully participating in the political process of independence, but he enjoyed the authority and respect of the Lithuanian people. Urbšys died on 30 April 1991. After lying in state at the city of Kaunas' War Museum, he was entombed in Petrašiūnai Cemetery.

His last political action was performed on 23 August 1988, when his speech, recorded on a tape recorder, was played during a Sąjūdis rally. In the speech, he narrated about the Soviet–Lithuanian Mutual Assistance Treaty signing in Moscow.

Close to his death, Urbšys was interviewed by a Swedish diplomat, who visited him on 9 September 1990 in his poor Soviet era flat that was located in the outskirts of the Kaunas city (soon after the declaration of the Act of the Re-Establishment of the State of Lithuania on 11 March 1990). When asked about the possible Lithuanian military resistance against the Soviet invasion in 1940, he said that it would have been impossible and that there was no reason to compare Lithuania's situation with Finland, which fought the Winter War because it had a much better geographical position, Karelia and the Mannerheim Line. He also noted that the resistance might have made the horrific occupation conditions of the state even worse.

Two schools have been named for Urbšys: Kaunas 29th Secondary School and a school in Tiskūnai.

== Awards ==
- Order of Vytautas the Great (Lithuania), Officer's Cross
- Order of the Lithuanian Grand Duke Gediminas (Lithuania), Commander's Grand Cross and Officer's Cross
- Royal Order of the Polar Star (Sweden), Commander 1st class (1935)

== Works ==
Juozas Urbšys translated works by Georges Duhamel and Pierre Beaumarchais from French to Lithuanian, among others. His memoir, Lithuania During the Fatal Years, 1939-40, was published in 1988.
