= Czesław Miłosz =

Polish-American poet and Nobel laureate (1911–2004)

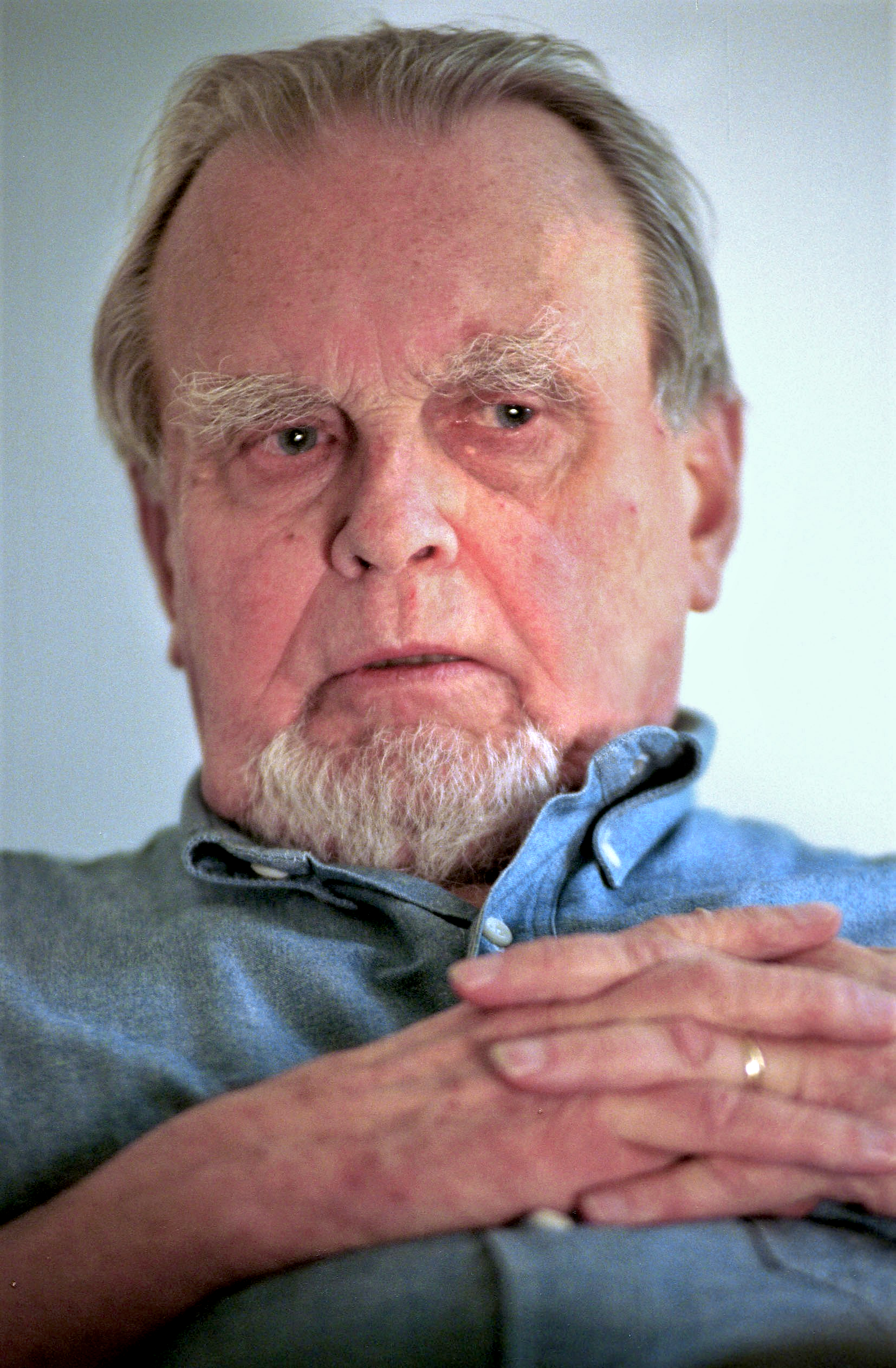
- Miłosz in 1999
- Born: 30 June 1911; Šeteniai, Kovno Governorate, Russian Empire
- Died: 14 August 2004 (aged 93); Kraków, Poland
- Citizenship: Lithuania (1918–??); Poland (??–1951) (Note: It is unclear when Miłosz obtained Polish citizenship. He claimed to have received a Lithuanian identity document in 1940, in which he wrote his nationality as Polish, but there is no official record to confirm what type of identity document he used during World War II.); Stateless (1951–1970); United States (from 1970) (Note: Franaszek claims Miłosz became an American citizen in 1962. Haven claims he became an American citizen in 1970.); Poland (from 1995) (Note: Miłosz maintained dual citizenship (Poland and USA) beginning in 1995.)
- Occupations: Poet; prose writer; professor; translator; diplomat
- Spouses: Janina Dłuska (m. 1956; died 1986) (Note: There is evidence that Miłosz and Janina obtained a civil marriage certificate in Warsaw in 1944. World War II had separated Janina from her first husband, who was in London. This prevented them from obtaining a divorce, and they remained legally married. Miłosz and Janina had a church-sanctioned wedding in France in 1956 after her first husband died.) Carol Thigpen (m. 1992; died 2002)
- Children: Anthony (born 1947); John Peter (born 1951)
- Writing career
- Notable works: Rescue (1945); The Captive Mind (1953); A Treatise on Poetry (1957)
- Notable awards: Neustadt International Prize for Literature (1978); Nobel Prize in Literature (1980); National Medal of Arts (1989); Order of the White Eagle (1994); Nike Award (1998)

Czesław Miłosz (/ˈmiːlɒʃ/ MEE-losh, US also /-lɔːʃ, -wɒʃ, -wɔːʃ/ -lawsh, -wosh, -wawsh; (Note: Czesław may be pronounced /ˈtʃɛswɑːf/ or /ˈtʃɛslɑːf/ in American English, /ˈtʃɛslɔː/ or /ˈtʃɛswæf/ in British English.) Polish: [ˈt͡ʂɛswaf ˈmiwɔʂ]; 30 June 1911 – 14 August 2004) was a Polish-American poet, prose writer, translator, and diplomat. Regarded as one of the great poets of the 20th century, he won the 1980 Nobel Prize in Literature. In its citation, the Swedish Academy called Miłosz a writer who "voices man's exposed condition in a world of severe conflicts".

Miłosz survived the German occupation of Warsaw during World War II and, after the war, became a cultural attaché for the Polish government. When communist authorities threatened his safety, he defected to France and ultimately chose exile in the United States, where he became a professor at the University of California, Berkeley. His poetry (particularly about his wartime experiences) and his appraisal of Stalinism in a prose book, The Captive Mind, brought him renown as a leading émigré artist and intellectual.

Throughout his life and work, Miłosz tackled questions of morality, politics, history, and faith. The latter, in particular, played a role in his work as he explored his Catholicism and personal experience. As a translator, he introduced Western works to a Polish audience, and as a scholar and editor, he championed a greater awareness of Slavic literature in the West. His poetry was primarily written in Polish; some of his prose was written in English.

Miłosz died in Kraków, Poland, in 2004. He is interred in Skałka, a church known in Poland as a place of honor for distinguished Poles.

== Life in Europe ==
=== Origins and early life ===
Czesław Miłosz was born on 30 June 1911, in the village of Šeteniai (Polish: Szetejnie), Kovno Governorate, Russian Empire (now Kėdainiai district, Kaunas County, Lithuania). He was the son of Aleksander Miłosz (1883–1959), a Polish civil engineer, and his wife, Weronika (née Kunat; 1887–1945).

Miłosz was born into a prominent family. On his mother's side, his grandfather was Zygmunt Kunat, a descendant of a Polish family that traced its lineage to the 13th century and owned an estate in Krasnogruda (in present-day Poland). Having studied agriculture in Warsaw, Zygmunt settled in Šeteniai after marrying Miłosz's grandmother, Jozefa, a descendant of the noble Syruć family, which was of Lithuanian origin. One of her ancestors, Szymon Syruć, had been personal secretary to Stanisław I, King of Poland and Grand Duke of Lithuania. Miłosz's paternal grandfather, Artur Miłosz, was also from a noble family and fought in the 1863 January Uprising for Polish independence. Miłosz's grandmother, Stanisława, was a doctor's daughter from Riga, Latvia, and a member of the German-Polish von Mohl family. The Miłosz estate was in Serbinai, a name that Miłosz's biographer Andrzej Franaszek has suggested could indicate Serbian origin; it is possible the Miłosz family originated in Serbia and settled in present-day Lithuania after being expelled from Germany centuries earlier. Miłosz's father was born and educated in Riga. Miłosz's mother was born in Šeteniai and educated in Kraków.

Despite this noble lineage, Miłosz's childhood on his maternal grandfather's estate in Šeteniai lacked the trappings of wealth or the customs of the upper class. He memorialized his childhood in a 1955 novel, The Issa Valley, and a 1959 memoir, Native Realm. In these works, he described the influence of his Catholic grandmother, Jozefa, his burgeoning love for literature, and his early awareness, as a member of the Polish gentry in Lithuania, of the role of class in society.

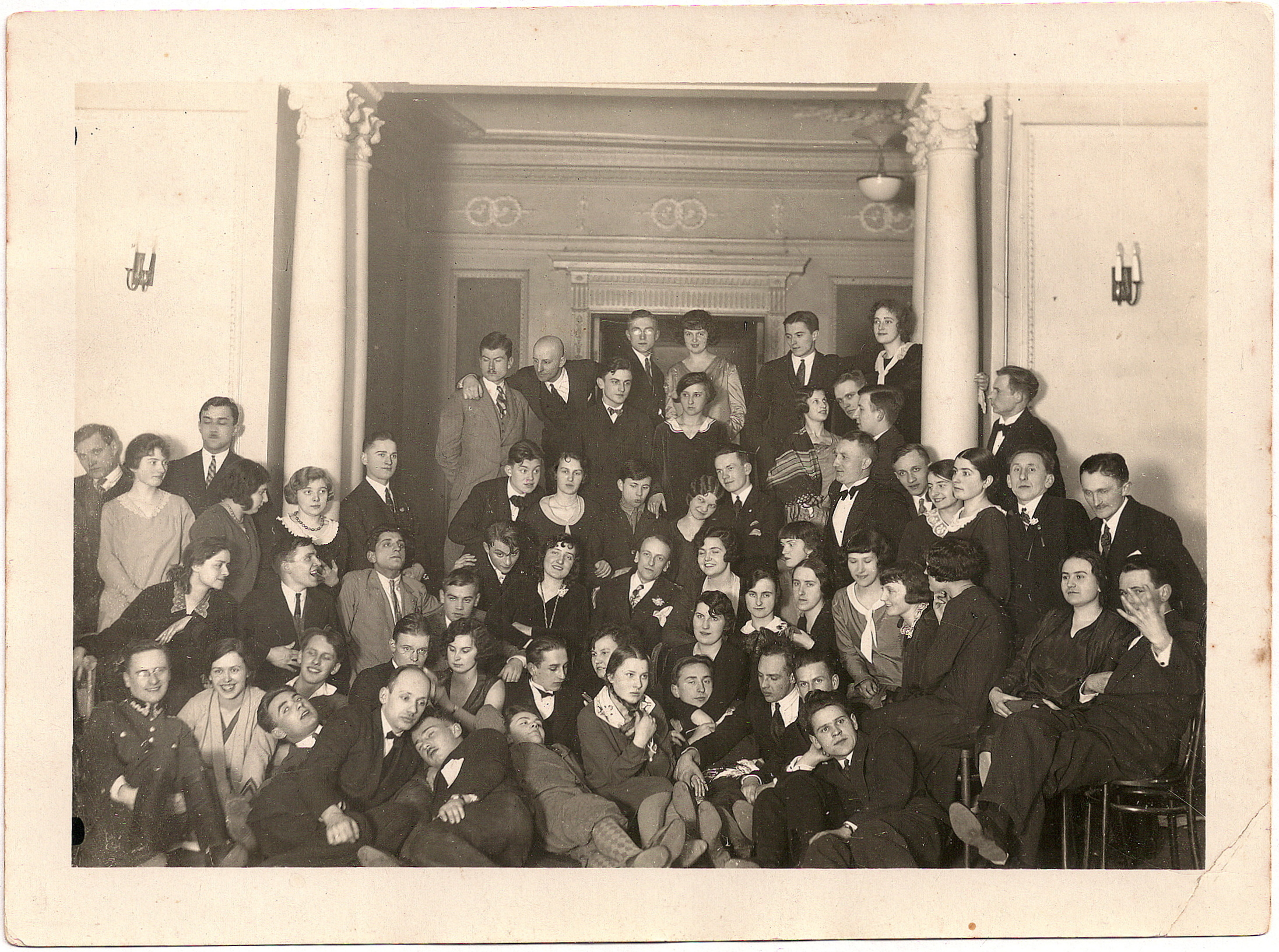
Czesław Miłosz, third row from top and fourth from left, with fellow students, Stefan Batory University, Wilno, 1930

Miłosz's early years were marked by upheaval. When his father was hired to work on infrastructure projects in Siberia, he and his mother traveled to be with him. After World War I broke out in 1914, Miłosz's father was conscripted into the Russian army, tasked with engineering roads and bridges for troop movements. Miłosz and his mother were sheltered in Vilnius when the German army captured it in 1915. Afterward, they once again joined Miłosz's father, following him as the front moved further into Russia, where, in 1917, Miłosz's brother, Andrzej, was born. Finally, after moving through Estonia and Latvia, the family returned to Šeteniai in 1918. But the Polish–Soviet War broke out in 1919, during which Miłosz's father was involved in a failed attempt to incorporate the newly independent Lithuania into the Second Polish Republic, resulting in his expulsion from Lithuania and the family's move to what was then known as Wilno, which had come under Polish control after the Polish–Lithuanian War of 1920. The Polish-Soviet War continued, forcing the family to move again. At one point during the conflict, Polish soldiers fired at Miłosz and his mother, an episode he recounted in Native Realm. The family returned to Wilno after the war ended in 1921.

Despite the interruptions of wartime wanderings, Miłosz proved to be an exceptional student with a facility for languages. He ultimately learned Polish, Lithuanian, Russian, English, French, and Hebrew. After graduation from Sigismund Augustus Gymnasium in Wilno, he entered Stefan Batory University in 1929 as a law student. While at university, Miłosz joined a student group called Academic Club of Wilno Wanderers and Intellectuals and a student poetry group called Żagary, along with the young poets Jerzy Zagórski, Teodor Bujnicki, Aleksander Rymkiewicz, Jerzy Putrament, and Józef Maśliński. His first published poems appeared in the university's student magazine in 1930.

In 1931, he visited Paris, where he first met his distant cousin, Oscar Milosz, a French-language poet of Lithuanian descent who had become a Swedenborgian. Oscar became a mentor and inspiration. Returning to Wilno, Miłosz's early awareness of class difference and sympathy for those less fortunate than himself inspired his defense of Jewish students at the university who were being harassed by an anti-Semitic mob. Stepping between the mob and the Jewish students, Miłosz fended off attacks. One student was killed when a rock was thrown at his head.

Miłosz's first volume of poetry, A Poem on Frozen Time, was published in Polish in 1933. In the same year, he publicly read his poetry at an anti-racist "Poetry of Protest" event in Wilno, occasioned by Hitler's rise to power in Germany. In 1934, he graduated with a law degree, and the poetry group Żagary disbanded. Miłosz relocated to Paris on a scholarship to study for one year and write articles for a newspaper back in Wilno. In Paris, he frequently met with his cousin Oscar.

By 1936, he had returned to Wilno, where he worked on literary programs at Polish Radio Wilno. His second poetry collection, Three Winters, was published that same year, eliciting from one critic a comparison to Adam Mickiewicz. After only one year at Radio Wilno, Miłosz was dismissed due to an accusation that he was a left-wing sympathizer: as a student, he had adopted socialist views from which, by then, he had publicly distanced himself, and he and his boss, Tadeusz Byrski, had produced programming that included performances by Jews and Byelorussians, which angered right-wing nationalists. After Byrski made a trip to the Soviet Union, an anonymous complaint was lodged with the management of Radio Wilno that the station housed a communist cell, and Byrski and Miłosz were dismissed. In summer 1937, Miłosz moved to Warsaw, where he found work at Polish Radio and met his future wife, Janina (née Dłuska; 1909–1986), who was at the time married to another man.

=== World War II ===
Miłosz was in Warsaw when it was bombarded as part of the German invasion of Poland in September 1939. Along with colleagues from Polish Radio, he escaped the city, making his way to Lwów. But when he learned that Janina had remained in Warsaw with her parents, he looked for a way back. The Soviet invasion of Poland thwarted his plans, and, to avoid the incoming Red Army, he fled to Bucharest. There he obtained a Lithuanian identity document and Soviet visa that allowed him to travel by train to Kyiv and then Wilno. After the Red Army invaded Lithuania, he procured fake documents that he used to enter the part of German-occupied Poland the Germans had dubbed the "General Government". It was a difficult journey, mostly on foot, that ended in summer 1940. Finally back in Warsaw, he reunited with Janina.

Like many Poles at the time, to evade notice by German authorities, Miłosz participated in underground activities. For example, with higher education officially forbidden to Poles, he attended underground lectures by Władysław Tatarkiewicz, the Polish philosopher and historian of philosophy and aesthetics. He translated Shakespeare's As You Like It and T. S. Eliot's The Waste Land into Polish. Along with his friend the novelist Jerzy Andrzejewski, he also arranged for the publication of his third volume of poetry, Poems, under a pseudonym in September 1940. The pseudonym was "Jan Syruć" and the title page said the volume had been published by a fictional press in Lwów in 1939; in fact, it may have been the first clandestine book published in occupied Warsaw. In 1942, Miłosz arranged for the publication of an anthology of Polish poets, Invincible Song: Polish Poetry of War Time, by an underground press.

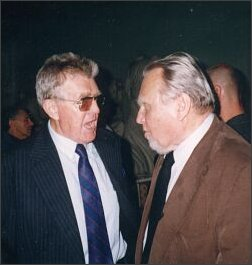
Czesław Miłosz (right) with brother Andrzej Miłosz at PEN Club World Congress, Warsaw, May 1999

Miłosz's riskiest underground wartime activity was aiding Jews in Warsaw, which he did through an underground socialist organization called Freedom. His brother, Andrzej, was also active in helping Jews in Nazi-occupied Poland; in 1943, Andrzej transported the Polish Jew Seweryn Tross and his wife from Vilnius to Warsaw. Miłosz took in the Trosses, found them a hiding place, and supported them financially. The Trosses ultimately died during the Warsaw Uprising. Miłosz helped at least three other Jews in similar ways: Felicja Wołkomińska and her brother and sister.

Despite his willingness to engage in underground activity and vehement opposition to the Nazis, Miłosz did not join the Polish Home Army. In later years, he explained that this was partly out of an instinct for self-preservation and partly because he saw its leadership as right-wing and dictatorial. He also did not participate in the planning or execution of the Warsaw Uprising. According to Polish literary historian Irena Grudzińska-Gross, he saw the uprising as a "doomed military effort" and lacked the "patriotic elation" for it. He called the uprising "a blameworthy, lightheaded enterprise", but later criticized the Red Army for failing to support it when it had the opportunity to do so.

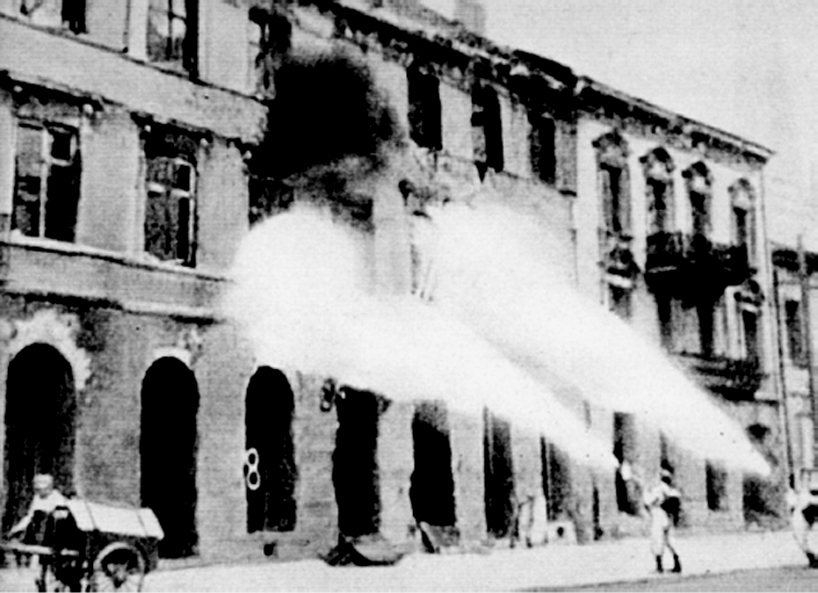
German troops setting fire to Warsaw buildings, 1944

As German troops began torching Warsaw buildings in August 1944, Miłosz was captured and held in a prisoner transit camp; he was later rescued by a Catholic nun—a stranger to him—who pleaded with the Germans on his behalf. Once freed, he and Janina escaped the city, ultimately settling in a village outside Kraków, where they were staying when the Red Army swept through Poland in January 1945, after Warsaw had been largely destroyed.

In the preface to his 1953 book The Captive Mind, Miłosz wrote, "I do not regret those years in Warsaw, which was, I believe, the most agonizing spot in the whole of terrorized Europe. Had I then chosen emigration, my life would certainly have followed a very different course. But my knowledge of the crimes which Europe has witnessed in the twentieth century would be less direct, less concrete than it is". Immediately after the war, Miłosz published his fourth poetry collection, Rescue; it focused on his wartime experiences and contains some of his most critically praised work, including the 20-poem cycle "The World," composed like a primer for naïve schoolchildren, and the cycle "Voices of Poor People". The volume also contains some of his most frequently anthologized poems, including "A Song on the End of the World", "Campo dei Fiori", and "A Poor Christian Looks at the Ghetto".

=== Diplomatic career ===
From 1945 to 1951, Miłosz served as a cultural attaché for the newly formed People's Republic of Poland. It was in this capacity that he first met Jane Zielonko, the future translator of The Captive Mind, with whom he had a brief relationship. He moved from New York City to Washington, D.C., and finally to Paris, organizing and promoting Polish cultural occasions such as musical concerts, art exhibitions, and literary and cinematic events. Although he was a representative of Poland, which had become a Soviet satellite country behind the Iron Curtain, he was not a member of any communist party. In The Captive Mind, he explained his reasons for accepting the role:

My mother tongue, work in my mother tongue, is for me the most important thing in life. And my country, where what I wrote could be printed and could reach the public, lay within the Eastern Empire. My aim and purpose was to keep alive freedom of thought in my own special field; I sought in full knowledge and conscience to subordinate my conduct to the fulfillment of that aim. I served abroad because I was thus relieved from direct pressure and, in the material which I sent to my publishers, could be bolder than my colleagues at home. I did not want to become an émigré and so give up all chance of taking a hand in what was going on in my own country.

Miłosz did not publish a book while he was a representative of the Polish government. Instead, he wrote articles for various Polish periodicals introducing readers to British and American writers like Eliot, William Faulkner, Ernest Hemingway, Norman Mailer, Robert Lowell, and W. H. Auden. He also translated into Polish Shakespeare's Othello and the work of Walt Whitman, Carl Sandburg, Pablo Neruda, and others.

In 1947, Miłosz's son, Anthony, was born in Washington, D.C.

In 1948, Miłosz arranged for the Polish government to fund a Department of Polish Studies at Columbia University. Named for Adam Mickiewicz, the department featured lectures by Manfred Kridl, Miłosz's friend who was then on the faculty of Smith College, and produced a scholarly book about Mickiewicz. Mickiewicz's granddaughter wrote a letter to Dwight D. Eisenhower, then the president of Columbia University, to express her approval, but the Polish American Congress, an influential group of Polish émigrés, denounced the arrangement in a letter to Eisenhower that they shared with the press, which alleged a communist infiltration at Columbia. Students picketed and called for boycotts. One faculty member resigned in protest. Despite the controversy, the department was established, the lectures took place, and the book was produced, but the department was discontinued in 1954 when funding from Poland ceased.

In 1949, Miłosz visited Poland for the first time since joining its diplomatic corps and was appalled by the conditions he saw, including an atmosphere of pervasive fear of the government. After returning to the U.S., he began to look for a way to leave his post, even soliciting advice from Albert Einstein, whom he met in the course of his duties.

As the Polish government, influenced by Joseph Stalin, became more oppressive, his superiors began to view Miłosz as a threat: he was outspoken in his reports to Warsaw and met with people not approved by his superiors. Consequently, his superiors called him "an individual who ideologically is totally alien". Toward the end of 1950, when Janina was pregnant with their second child, Miłosz was recalled to Warsaw, where in December 1950 his passport was confiscated, ostensibly until it could be determined that he did not plan to defect. After intervention by Poland's foreign minister, Zygmunt Modzelewski, Miłosz's passport was returned. Realizing that he was in danger if he remained in Poland, Miłosz left for Paris in January 1951.

=== Asylum in France ===
Upon arriving in Paris, Miłosz went into hiding, aided by the staff of the Polish émigré magazine Kultura. With his wife and son still in the United States, he applied to enter the U.S. and was denied. At the time, the U.S. was in the grip of McCarthyism, and influential Polish émigrés had convinced American officials that Miłosz was a communist. Unable to leave France, Miłosz was not present for the birth of his second son, John Peter, in Washington, D.C., in 1951.

With the United States closed to him, Miłosz requested—and was granted—political asylum in France. After three months in hiding, he announced his defection at a press conference and in a Kultura article, "No", that explained his refusal to live in Poland or continue working for the Polish regime. He was the first artist of note from a communist country to make public his reasons for breaking ties with his government. His case attracted attention in Poland, where his work was banned and he was attacked in the press, and in the West, where prominent individuals voiced criticism and support. For example, the future Nobel laureate Pablo Neruda, then a supporter of the Soviet Union, attacked him in a communist newspaper as "The Man Who Ran Away". On the other hand, Albert Camus, another future Nobel laureate, visited Miłosz and offered his support. Another supporter during this period was the Swiss philosopher Jeanne Hersch, with whom Miłosz had a brief romantic affair.

Miłosz was finally reunited with his family in 1953, when Janina and the children joined him in France. That same year saw the publication of The Captive Mind, a nonfiction work that uses case studies to dissect the methods and consequences of Soviet communism, which at the time had prominent admirers in the West. The book brought Miłosz his first readership in the United States, where it was credited by some on the political left (such as Susan Sontag) with helping to change perceptions about communism. The German philosopher Karl Jaspers described it as a "significant historical document". It became a staple of political science courses and is considered a classic work in the study of totalitarianism.

Miłosz's years in France were productive. In addition to The Captive Mind, he published two poetry collections (Daylight (1954) and A Treatise on Poetry (1957)), two novels (The Seizure of Power (1955) and The Issa Valley (1955)), and a memoir (Native Realm (1959)). All were published in Polish by an émigré press in Paris.

Andrzej Franaszek has called A Treatise on Poetry Miłosz's magnum opus, while the scholar Helen Vendler compared it to The Waste Land, a work "so powerful that it bursts the bounds in which it was written—the bounds of language, geography, epoch". A long poem divided into four sections, A Treatise on Poetry surveys Polish history, recounts Miłosz's experience of war, and explores the relationship between art and history.

In 1956, Miłosz and Janina were married.

== Life in the United States ==
=== University of California, Berkeley ===
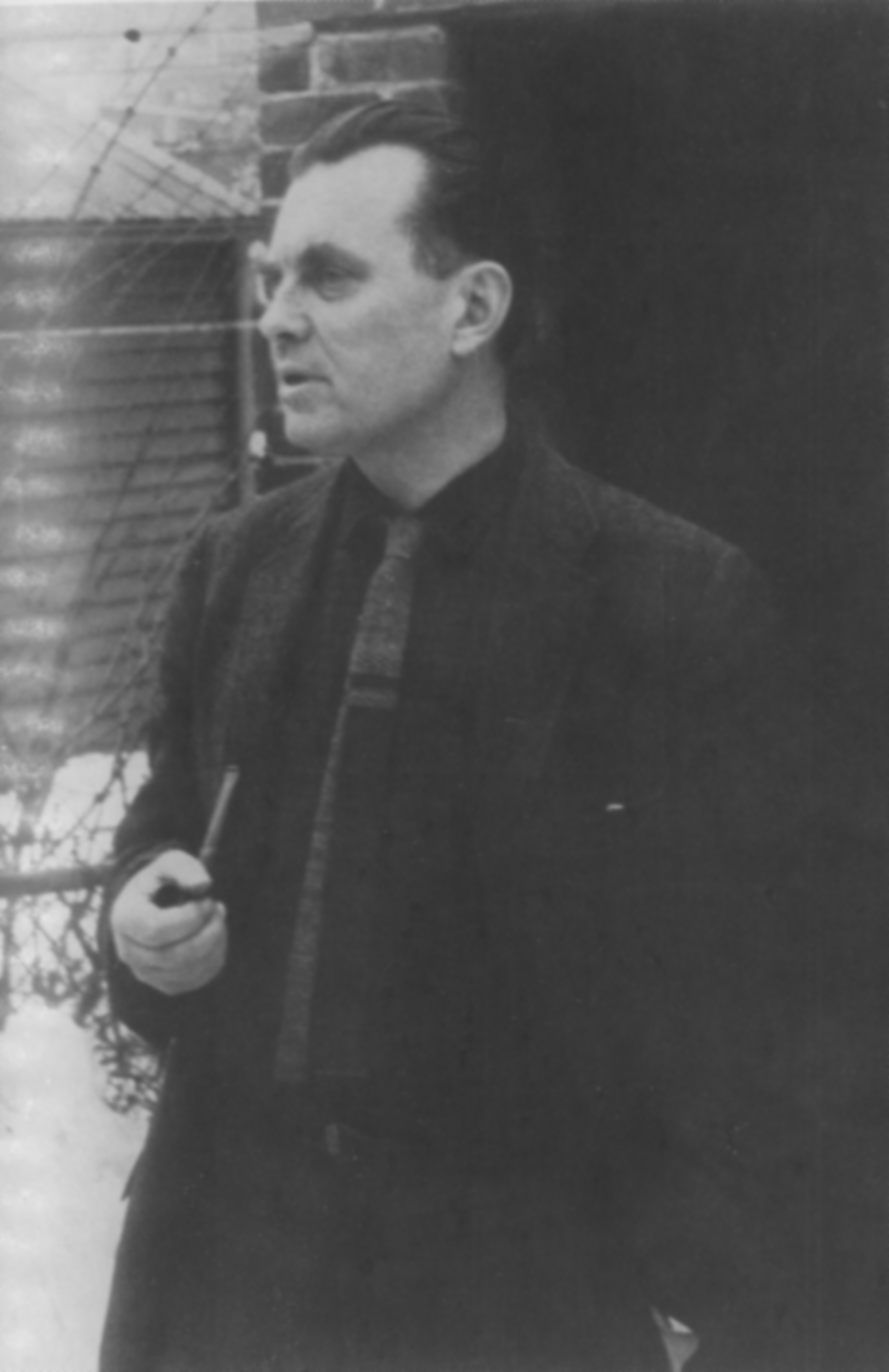
Miłosz in mid-career

In 1960, Miłosz was offered a position as a visiting lecturer at the University of California, Berkeley. With this offer, and with the climate of McCarthyism abated, he was able to move to the United States. He proved to be an adept and popular teacher, and was offered tenure after only two months. The rarity of this, and the degree to which he had impressed his colleagues, are underscored by the fact that Miłosz lacked a PhD and teaching experience. Yet his deep learning was obvious, and after years of working administrative jobs that he found stifling, he told friends that he was in his element in a classroom. With stable employment as a tenured professor of Slavic languages and literatures, Miłosz was able to secure American citizenship and purchase a home in Berkeley. (Note: Franaszek claims Miłosz became an American citizen in 1962. Haven claims he became an American citizen in 1970.)

Miłosz began to publish scholarly articles in English and Polish on a variety of authors, including Fyodor Dostoevsky. But despite his successful transition to the U.S., he described his early years at Berkeley as frustrating, as he was isolated from friends and viewed as a political figure rather than a great poet. (In fact, some of his Berkeley faculty colleagues, unaware of his creative output, expressed astonishment when he won the Nobel Prize.) His poetry was not available in English, and he was not able to publish in Poland.

As part of an effort to introduce American readers to his poetry, as well as to his fellow Polish poets' work, Miłosz conceived and edited the anthology Postwar Polish Poetry, which was published in English in 1965. American poets like W.S. Merwin, and American scholars like Clare Cavanagh, have credited it with a profound impact. It was many English-language readers' first exposure to Miłosz's poetry, as well as that of Polish poets like Wisława Szymborska, Zbigniew Herbert, and Tadeusz Różewicz. (In the same year, Miłosz's poetry also appeared in the first issue of Modern Poetry in Translation, an English-language journal founded by prominent literary figures Ted Hughes and Daniel Weissbort. The issue also featured Miroslav Holub, Yehuda Amichai, Ivan Lalić, Vasko Popa, Zbigniew Herbert, and Andrei Voznesensky.) In 1969, Miłosz's textbook The History of Polish Literature was published in English, the language in which it was written. He followed this with a volume of his own work, Selected Poems (1973), some of which he translated into English himself. This was his first anthology of poetry published in English.

At the same time, Miłosz continued to publish in Polish with an émigré press in Paris. His poetry collections from this period include King Popiel and Other Poems (1962), Bobo’s Metamorphosis (1965), City Without a Name (1969), and From the Rising of the Sun (1974).

During Miłosz's time at Berkeley, the campus became a hotbed of student protest, notably as the home of the Free Speech Movement, which has been credited with helping to "define a generation of student activism" across the United States. Miłosz's relationship to student protesters was sometimes antagonistic: he called them "spoiled children of the bourgeoisie" and their political zeal naïve. At one campus event in 1970, he mocked protesters who claimed to be demonstrating for peace and love: "Talk to me about love when they come into your cell one morning, line you all up, and say 'You and you, step forward—it’s your time to die—unless any of your friends loves you so much he wants to take your place!'" Comments like these were in keeping with his stance toward American counterculture of the 1960s in general. For example, in 1968, when Miłosz was listed as a signatory of an open letter of protest written by poet and counterculture figure Allen Ginsberg and published in The New York Review of Books, Miłosz responded by calling the letter "dangerous nonsense" and insisting that he had not signed it.

After 18 years, Miłosz retired from teaching in 1978. To mark the occasion, he was awarded a "Berkeley Citation", the University of California's equivalent of an honorary doctorate. But when his wife, Janina, fell ill and required expensive medical treatment, Miłosz returned to teaching seminars. The year 1978 also marked the publication of his second English-language poetry anthology, Bells in Winter.

=== Nobel laureate ===
On 9 October 1980, the Swedish Academy announced that Miłosz had won the Nobel Prize in Literature. The award catapulted him to global fame. On the day the prize was announced, Miłosz held a brief press conference and then left to teach a class on Dostoevsky. In his Nobel lecture, Miłosz described his view of the role of the poet, lamented the tragedies of the 20th century, and paid tribute to his cousin Oscar.

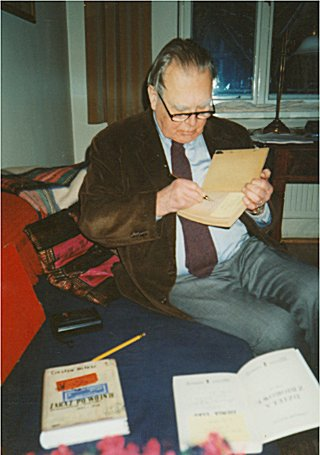
Miłosz, 1998

Many Poles became aware of Miłosz for the first time when he won the Nobel Prize. After a 30-year ban in Poland, his writing was finally published there in limited selections. He was also able to visit Poland for the first time since fleeing in 1951 and was greeted by crowds with a hero's welcome. He met with leading Polish figures like Lech Wałęsa and Pope John Paul II. At the same time, his early work, until then only available in Polish, began to be translated into English and many other languages.

In 1981, Miłosz was appointed the Norton Professor of Poetry at Harvard University, where he was invited to deliver the Charles Eliot Norton Lectures. He used the opportunity, as he had before becoming a Nobel laureate, to draw attention to writers who had been unjustly imprisoned or persecuted. The lectures were published as The Witness of Poetry (1983).

Miłosz continued to publish work in Polish through his longtime publisher in Paris, including the poetry collections Hymn of the Pearl (1981) and Unattainable Earth (1986), and the essay collection Beginning with My Streets (1986).

In 1986, Miłosz's wife, Janina, died.

In 1988, Miłosz's Collected Poems appeared in English; it was the first of several attempts to collect all his poetry into a single volume. After the fall of communism in Poland, he split his time between Berkeley and Kraków, and he began to publish his writing in Polish with a publisher based in Kraków. When Lithuania broke free from the Soviet Union in 1991, Miłosz visited for the first time since 1939. In 2000, he moved to Kraków.

In 1992, Miłosz married Carol Thigpen, an academic at Emory University in Atlanta, Georgia. They remained married until her death in 2002. His work from the 1990s includes the poetry collections Facing the River (1994) and Road-side Dog (1997), and the collection of short prose Miłosz’s ABC’s (1997). Miłosz's last stand-alone volumes of poetry were This (2000), and The Second Space (2002). Uncollected poems written afterward appeared in English in New and Selected Poems (2004) and, posthumously, in Selected and Last Poems (2011).

== Death ==
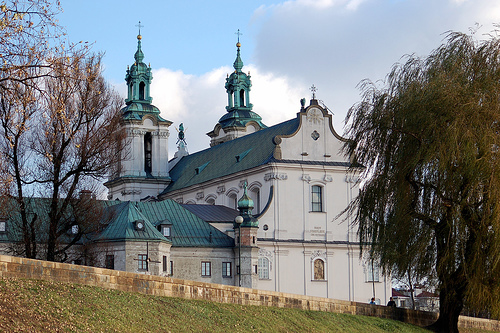
Miłosz's final resting place: Skałka Roman Catholic Church, Kraków

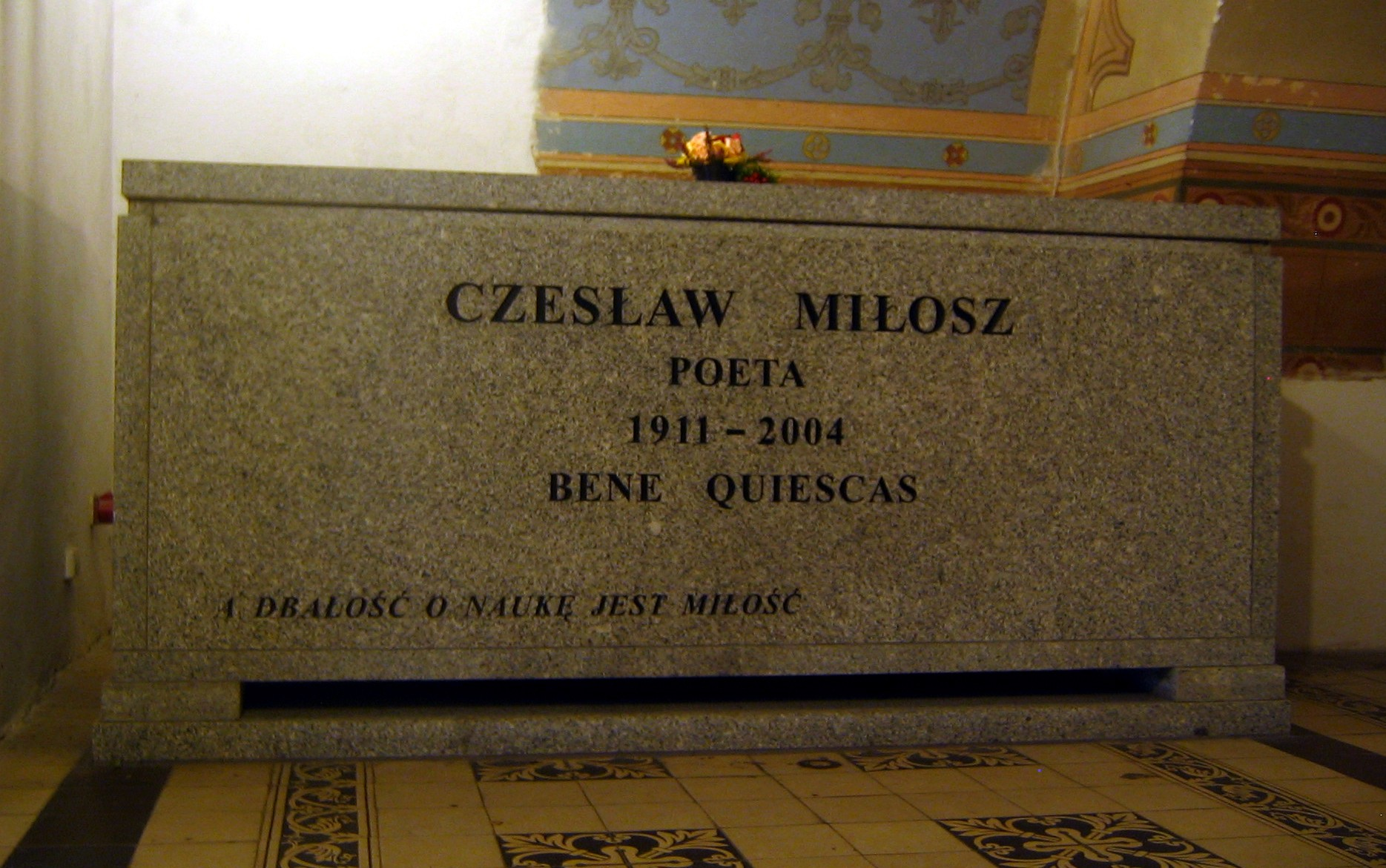
Miłosz's sarcophagus. The Latin inscription reads "May you rest well"; the Polish inscription reads "The cultivation of learning, too, is love."

Czesław Miłosz died on 14 August 2004, at his Kraków home, aged 93. He was given a state funeral at the historic Mariacki Church in Kraków. Polish Prime Minister Marek Belka attended, as did the former president of Poland, Lech Wałęsa. Thousands of people lined the streets to witness his coffin moved by military escort to his final resting place at Skałka Roman Catholic Church, where he was one of the last to be commemorated. In front of that church, the poets Seamus Heaney, Adam Zagajewski, and Robert Hass read Miłosz's poem "In Szetejnie" in Polish, French, English, Russian, Lithuanian, and Hebrew—all the languages Miłosz knew. Media from around the world covered the funeral.

Protesters threatened to disrupt the proceedings on the grounds that Miłosz was anti-Polish, anti-Catholic, and had signed a petition supporting gay and lesbian freedom of speech and assembly. Pope John Paul II, along with Miłosz's confessor, issued public messages confirming that Miłosz had received the sacraments, which quelled the protest.

== Family ==
Miłosz's brother, Andrzej Miłosz (1917–2002), was a Polish journalist, translator, and documentary film producer. His work included Polish documentaries about his brother.

Miłosz's son, Anthony, is a composer and software designer. He studied linguistics, anthropology, and chemistry at the University of California at Berkeley, and neuroscience at the University of California, San Francisco Medical Center. In addition to releasing recordings of his own compositions, he has translated some of his father's poems into English.

== Honors ==
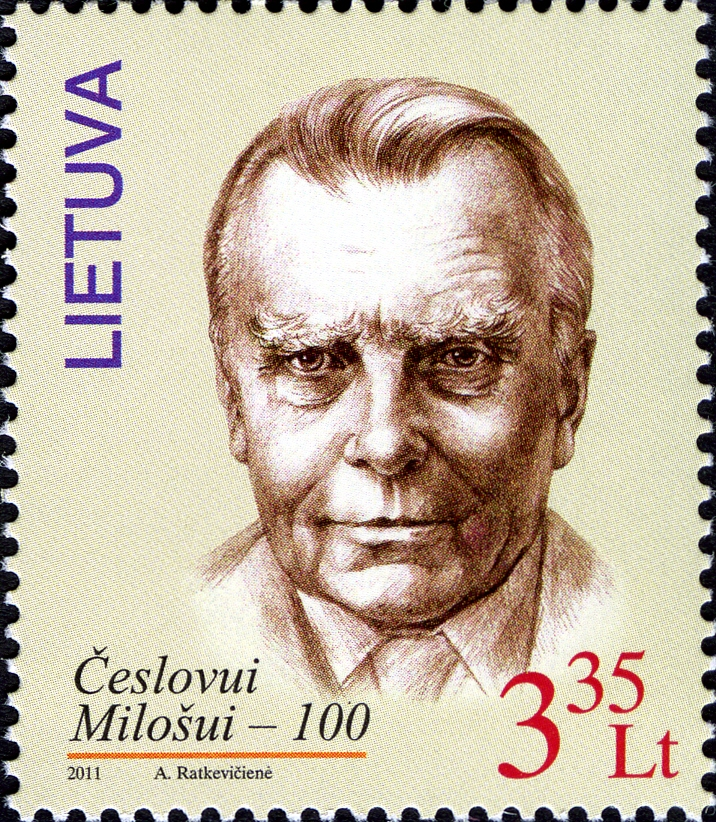
Lithuanian stamp, 100th anniversary of Miłosz's birth

In addition to the Nobel Prize in Literature, Miłosz received the following awards:

- Polish PEN Translation Prize (1974)
- Guggenheim Fellowship for Creative Arts (1976)
- Neustadt International Prize for Literature (1978)
- National Medal of Arts (United States, 1989)
- Robert Kirsch Award (1990)
- Order of the White Eagle (Poland, 1994)

Miłosz was named a distinguished visiting professor or fellow at many institutions, including the University of Michigan and University of Oklahoma, where he was a Puterbaugh Fellow in 1999. He was an elected member of the American Academy of Arts and Sciences, the American Academy of Arts and Letters, and the Serbian Academy of Sciences and Arts. He received honorary doctorates from Harvard University, the University of Michigan, the University of California at Berkeley, Jagiellonian University, Catholic University of Lublin, and Vytautas Magnus University in Lithuania. Vytautas Magnus University and Jagiellonian University have academic centers named for Miłosz.

In 1992, Miłosz was made an honorary citizen of Lithuania, where his birthplace was made into a museum and conference center. In 1993, he was made an honorary citizen of Kraków.

His books also received awards. His first, A Poem on Frozen Time, won an award from the Union of Polish Writers in Wilno. The Seizure of Power received the Prix Littéraire Européen (European Literary Prize). The collection Roadside Dog received a Nike Award in Poland.

In 1989, Miłosz was named one of the "Righteous Among the Nations" at Israel's Yad Vashem memorial to the Holocaust, in recognition of his efforts to save Jews in Warsaw during World War II.

Miłosz has also been honored posthumously. The Polish Parliament declared 2011, the centennial of his birth, the "Year of Miłosz". It was marked by conferences and tributes throughout Poland, as well as in New York City, at Yale University, and at the Dublin Writers Festival, among many other locations. The same year, he was featured on a Lithuanian postage stamp. Streets are named for him near Paris, Vilnius, and in the Polish cities of Kraków, Poznań, Gdańsk, Białystok, and Wrocław. In Gdańsk there is a Czesław Miłosz Square. In 2013, a primary school in Vilnius was named for Miłosz, joining schools in Mierzecice, Poland, and Schaumburg, Illinois, that bear his name.

== Legacy ==
=== Cultural impact ===
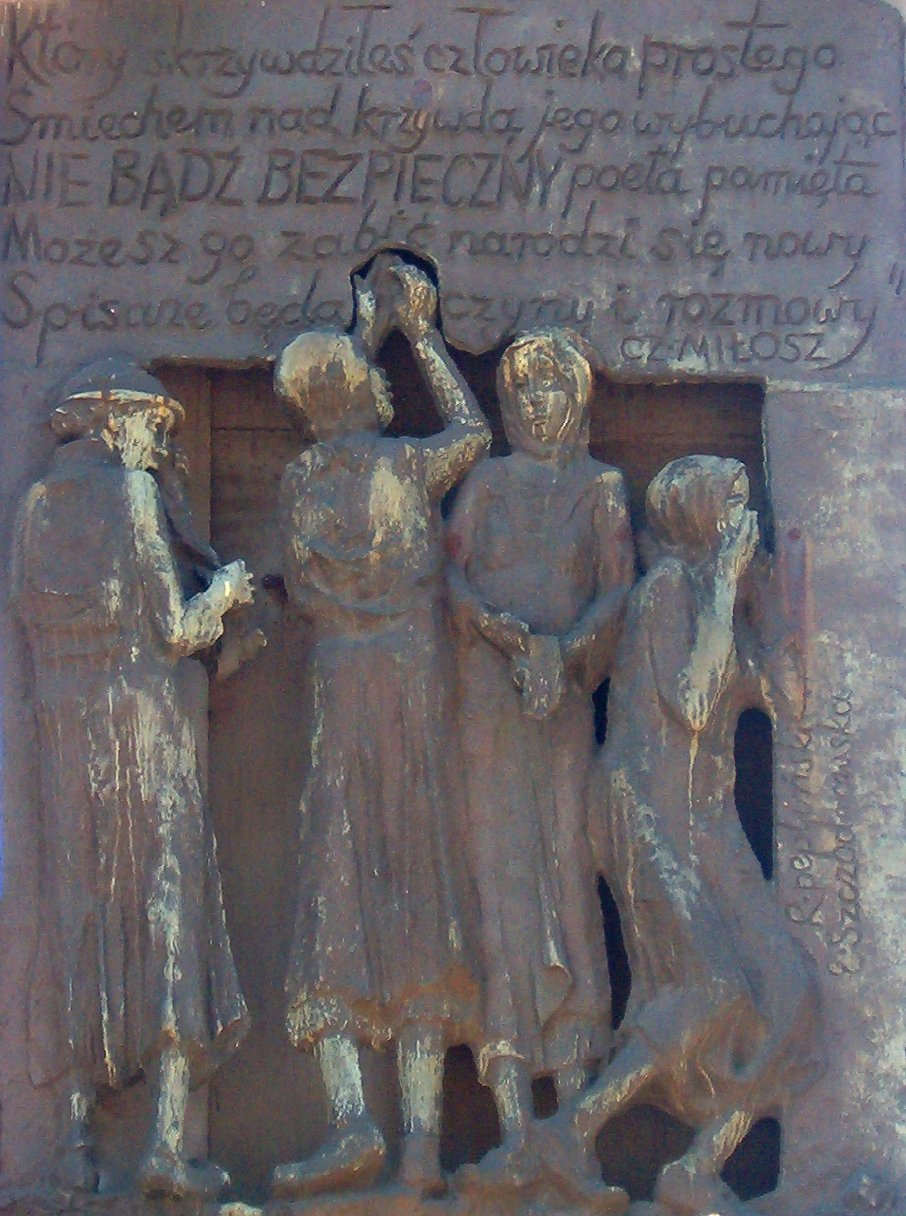
Miłosz's poem on the Monument to the Fallen Shipyard Workers of 1970, Gdańsk, Poland

In 1978, the Russian-American poet Joseph Brodsky called Miłosz "one of the great poets of our time; perhaps the greatest". Miłosz has been cited as an influence by numerous writers—contemporaries and succeeding generations. For example, scholars have written about Miłosz's influence on the writing of Seamus Heaney, and Clare Cavanagh has identified the following poets as having benefited from Miłosz's influence: Robert Pinsky, Edward Hirsch, Rosanna Warren, Robert Hass, Charles Simic, Mary Karr, Carolyn Forché, Mark Strand, Ted Hughes, Joseph Brodsky, and Derek Walcott.

By being smuggled into Poland, Miłosz's writing was a source of inspiration to the anti-communist Solidarity movement there in the early 1980s. Lines from his poem "You Who Wronged" are inscribed on the Monument to the Fallen Shipyard Workers of 1970 in Gdańsk, where Solidarity originated.

Of the effect of Miłosz's edited volume Postwar Polish Poetry on English-language poets, Merwin wrote, "Miłosz’s book had been a talisman and had made most of the literary bickering among the various ideological encampments, then most audible in the poetic doctrines in English, seem frivolous and silly". Similarly, the British poet and scholar Donald Davie argued that, for many English-language writers, Miłosz's work encouraged an expansion of poetry to include multiple viewpoints and an engagement with subjects of intellectual and historical importance: "I have suggested, going for support to the writings of Miłosz, that no concerned and ambitious poet of the present day, aware of the enormities of twentieth-century history, can for long remain content with the privileged irresponsibility allowed to, or imposed on, the lyric poet".

Miłosz's writing continues to be the subject of academic study, conferences, and cultural events. His papers, including manuscripts, correspondence, and other materials, are housed at the Beinecke Rare Book and Manuscript Library at Yale University.

From May 2024, Czesław Miłosz's Nobel Prize medal, Nobel Prize notebook of Czesław Miłosz and a fair copy of his poem Rays of Dazzling Light (Polish: Jasności promieniste) are presented at a permanent exhibition in the Palace of the Commonwealth in Warsaw.

=== Nationality ===
Miłosz's birth in a time and place of shifting borders and overlapping cultures, and his later naturalization as an American citizen, have led to competing claims about his nationality. Although his family identified as Polish and Polish was his primary language, and although he frequently spoke of Poland as his country, he also publicly identified himself as one of the last citizens of the multi-ethnic Grand Duchy of Lithuania. Writing in a Polish newspaper in 2000, he claimed, "I was born in the very center of Lithuania and so have a greater right than my great forebear, Mickiewicz, to write 'O Lithuania, my country.'" But in his Nobel lecture, he said, "My family in the 16th century already spoke Polish, just as many families in Finland spoke Swedish and in Ireland English, so I am a Polish, not a Lithuanian, poet". Public statements such as these, and numerous others, inspired discussion about his nationality, including a claim that he was "arguably the greatest spokesman and representative of a Lithuania that, in Miłosz’s mind, was bigger than its present incarnation". Others have viewed Miłosz as an American author, hosting exhibitions and writing about him from that perspective and including his work in anthologies of American poetry.

But in The New York Review of Books in 1981, the critic John Bayley wrote, "nationality is not a thing [Miłosz] can take seriously; it would be hard to imagine a greater writer more emancipated from even its most subtle pretensions". Echoing this notion, the scholar and diplomat Piotr Wilczek argued that, even when he was greeted as a national hero in Poland, Miłosz "made a distinct effort to remain a universal thinker". Speaking at a ceremony to celebrate his birth centenary in 2011, Lithuanian President Dalia Grybauskaitė stressed that Miłosz's works "unite the Lithuanian and Polish people and reveal how close and how fruitful the ties between our people can be".

=== Catholicism ===
Though raised Catholic, Miłosz as a young man came to adopt a "scientific, atheistic position mostly", though he later returned to the Catholic faith. He translated parts of the Bible into Polish, and allusions to Catholicism pervade his poetry, culminating in a long 2001 poem, "A Theological Treatise". For some critics, Miłosz's belief that literature should provide spiritual fortification was outdated: Franaszek suggests that Miłosz's belief was evidence of a "beautiful naïveté", while David Orr, citing Miłosz's dismissal of "poetry which does not save nations or people", accused him of "pompous nonsense".

Miłosz expressed some criticism of both Catholicism and Poland (a majority-Catholic country), causing furor in some quarters when it was announced that he would be interred in Kraków's historic Skałka church. Cynthia Haven writes that, to some readers, Miłosz's embrace of Catholicism can seem surprising and complicates the understanding of him and his work.

== Work ==
=== Form ===
While Miłosz is best known for his poetry, his body of work spans multiple other literary genres: fiction (particularly the novel), memoir, criticism, personal essay, and lectures. His letters are also of interest to scholars and lay readers; for example, his correspondence with writers such as Jerzy Andrzejewski, Witold Gombrowicz, and Thomas Merton have been published.

At the outset of his career, Miłosz was known as a "catastrophist" poet—a label critics applied to him and other poets from the Żagary poetry group to describe their use of surreal imagery and formal inventiveness in reaction to a Europe beset by extremist ideologies and war. While Miłosz evolved away from the apocalyptic view of catastrophist poetry, he continued to pursue formal inventiveness throughout his career. As a result, his poetry demonstrates a wide-ranging mastery of form, from long or epic poems (e.g., A Treatise on Poetry) to poems of just two lines (e.g., "On the Death of a Poet" from the collection This), and from prose poems and free verse to classic forms such as the ode or elegy. Some of his poems use rhyme, but many do not. In numerous cases, Miłosz used form to illuminate meaning in his poetry; for example, by juxtaposing variable stanzas to accentuate ideas or voices that challenge each other.

=== Themes ===
Miłosz's work is known for its complexity; according to the scholars Leonard Nathan and Arthur J. Quinn, Miłosz "prided himself on being an esoteric writer accessible to a mere handful of readers". Nevertheless, some common themes are readily apparent throughout his body of work.

The poet, critic, and frequent Miłosz translator Robert Hass has described Miłosz as "a poet of great inclusiveness", with a fidelity to capturing life in all of its sensuousness and multiplicities. According to Hass, Miłosz's poems can be viewed as "dwelling in contradiction", where one idea or voice is presented only to be immediately challenged or changed. According to English poet Donald Davie, this allowance for contradictory voices—a shift from the solo lyric voice to a chorus—is among the most important aspects of Miłosz's work.

The poetic chorus is deployed not just to highlight the complexity of the modern world but also to search for morality, another of Miłosz's recurrent themes. Nathan and Quinn write, "Miłosz’s work is devoted to unmasking man’s fundamental duality; he wants to make his readers admit the contradictory nature of their own experience" because doing so "forces us to assert our preferences as preferences". That is, it forces readers to make conscious choices, which is the arena of morality. At times, Miłosz's exploration of morality was explicit and concrete, such as when, in The Captive Mind, he ponders the right way to respond to three Lithuanian women who were forcibly moved to a Russian communal farm and wrote to him for help, or when, in the poems "Campo Dei Fiori" and "A Poor Christian Looks at the Ghetto", he addresses survivor's guilt and the morality of writing about another's suffering.

Miłosz's exploration of morality takes place in the context of history, and confrontation with history is another of his major themes. Vendler wrote, "for Miłosz, the person is irrevocably a person in history, and the interchange between external event and the individual life is the matrix of poetry". Having experienced both Nazism and Stalinism, Miłosz was particularly concerned with the notion of "historical necessity", which, in the 20th century, was used to justify human suffering on a previously unheard-of scale. Yet Miłosz did not reject the concept entirely. Nathan and Quinn summarize Miłosz's appraisal of historical necessity as it appears in his essay collection Views from San Francisco Bay: "Some species rise, others fall, as do human families, nations, and whole civilizations. There may well be an internal logic to these transformations, a logic that when viewed from sufficient distance has its own elegance, harmony, and grace. Our reason tempts us to be enthralled by this superhuman splendor; but when so enthralled we find it difficult to remember, except perhaps as an element in an abstract calculus, the millions of individuals, the millions upon millions, who unwillingly paid for this splendor with pain and blood".

Miłosz's willingness to accept a form of logic in history points to another recurrent aspect of his writing: his capacity for wonder, amazement, and, ultimately, faith—not always religious faith, but "faith in the objective reality of a world to be known by the human mind but not constituted by that mind". At other times, Miłosz was more explicitly religious in his work. According to scholar and translator Michael Parker, "crucial to any understanding of Miłosz’s work is his complex relationship to Catholicism". His writing is filled with allusions to Christian figures, symbols, and theological ideas, though Miłosz was closer to Gnosticism, or what he called Manichaeism, in his personal beliefs, viewing the universe as ruled by an evil whose influence human beings must try to escape. From this perspective, "he can at once admit that the world is ruled by necessity, by evil, and yet still find hope and sustenance in the beauty of the world. History reveals the pointlessness of human striving, the instability of human things; but time also is the moving image of eternity". According to Hass, this viewpoint left Miłosz "with the task of those heretical Christians…to suffer time, to contemplate being, and to live in the hope of the redemption of the world".

=== Influences ===
Miłosz had numerous literary and intellectual influences, although scholars of his work—and Miłosz himself, in his writings—have identified the following as significant: Oscar Miłosz (who inspired Miłosz's interest in the metaphysical) and, through him, Emanuel Swedenborg; Lev Shestov; Simone Weil (whose work Miłosz translated into Polish); Dostoevsky; William Blake (whose concept of "Ulro" Miłosz borrowed for his book The Land of Ulro), and Eliot.

== Selected bibliography ==
=== Poetry collections ===
- 1933: Poemat o czasie zastygłym (A Poem on Frozen Time); Wilno: Kolo Polonistów Sluchaczy Uniwersytetu Stefana Batorego
- 1936: Trzy zimy (Three Winters); Warsaw: Władysława Mortkowicz
- 1940: Wiersze (Poems); Warsaw (clandestine publication)
- 1945: Ocalenie (Rescue); Warsaw: Spółdzielnia Wydawnicza Czytelnik
- 1954: Światło dzienne (Daylight); Paris: Instytut Literacki
- 1957: Traktat poetycki (A Treatise on Poetry); Paris: Instytut Literacki
- 1962: Król Popiel i inne wiersze (King Popiel and Other Poems); Paris: Instytut Literacki
- 1965: Gucio zaczarowany (Gucio Enchanted); Paris: Instytut Literacki
- 1969: Miasto bez imienia (City Without a Name); Paris: Instytut Literacki
- 1974: Gdzie słońce wschodzi i kedy zapada (Where the Sun Rises and Where it Sets); Paris: Instytut Literacki
- 1982: Hymn o Perle (Hymn of the Pearl); Paris: Instytut Literacki
- 1984: Nieobjęta ziemia (Unattainable Earth); Paris: Instytut Literacki
- 1989: Kroniki (Chronicles); Paris: Instytut Literacki
- 1991: Dalsze okolice (Farther Surroundings); Kraków: Społeczny Instytut Wydawniczy Znak
- 1994: Na brzegu rzeki (Facing the River); Kraków: Społeczny Instytut Wydawniczy Znak
- 1997: Piesek przydrożny (Roadside Dog); Kraków: Społeczny Instytut Wydawniczy Znak
- 2000: To (This), Kraków: Społeczny Instytut Wydawniczy Znak
- 2002: Druga przestrzen (The Second Space); Kraków: Społeczny Instytut Wydawniczy Znak
- 2003: Orfeusz i Eurydyka (Orpheus and Eurydice); Kraków: Wydawnictwo Literackie
- 2006: Wiersze ostatnie (Last Poems) Kraków: Społeczny Instytut Wydawniczy Znak
- 2025: Poet in the New World--Poems, 1946-1953; HarperCollins

=== Prose collections ===
- 1953: Zniewolony umysł (The Captive Mind); Paris: Instytut Literacki
- 1959: Rodzinna Europa (Native Realm); Paris: Instytut Literacki
- 1969: The History of Polish Literature; London-New York: MacMillan
- 1969: Widzenia nad Zatoką San Francisco (A View of San Francisco Bay); Paris: Instytut Literacki
- 1974: Prywatne obowiązki (Private Obligations); Paris: Instytut Literacki
- 1976: Emperor of the Earth; Berkeley: University of California Press
- 1977: Ziemia Ulro (The Land of Ulro); Paris: Instytut Literacki
- 1979: Ogród Nauk (The Garden of Science); Paris: Instytut Literacki
- 1981: Nobel Lecture; New York: Farrar, Straus, Giroux
- 1983: The Witness of Poetry; Cambridge, Massachusetts: Harvard University Press
- 1985: Zaczynając od moich ulic (Starting from My Streets); Paris: Instytut Literacki
- 1986: A mi Európánkról (About our Europe); New York: Hill and Wang
- 1989: Rok myśliwego (A year of the hunter); Paris: Instytut Literacki
- 1992: Szukanie ojczyzny (In Search of a Homeland); Kraków: Społeczny Instytut Wydawniczy Znak
- 1995: Metafizyczna pauza (The Metaphysical Pause); Kraków: Społeczny Instytut Wydawniczy Znak
- 1996: Legendy nowoczesności (Modern Legends, War Essays); Kraków: Wydawnictwo Literackie
- 1997: Zycie na wyspach (Life on Islands); Kraków: Społeczny Instytut Wydawniczy Znak
- 1997: Abecadło Milosza (Milosz's ABC's); Kraków: Wydawnictwo Literackie
- 1998: Inne Abecadło (A Further Alphabet); Kraków: Wydawnictwo Literackie
- 1998: Un libro de cosas luminosas, Antología de poesía internacional (A Book of Luminous Things); Boston: Mariner Books
- 1999: Wyprawa w dwudziestolecie (An Excursion through the Twenties and Thirties); Kraków: Wydawnictwo Literackie
- 2001: To Begin Where I Am: Selected Essays; New York: Farrar, Straus and Giroux
- 2004: Spiżarnia literacka (A Literary Larder); Kraków: Wydawnictwo Literackie
- 2004: Przygody młodego umysłu; Kraków: Społeczny Instytut Wydawniczy Znak
- 2004: O podróżach w czasie; (On time travel) Kraków: Społeczny Instytut Wydawniczy Znak

=== Novels ===
- 1955: Zdobycie władzy (The Seizure of Power); Paris: Instytut Literacki
- 1955: Dolina Issy (The Issa Valley); Paris: Instytut Literacki
- 1987: The Mountains of Parnassus; Yale University Press

=== Translations by Miłosz ===
- 1968: Selected Poems by Zbigniew Herbert translated by Czesław Miłosz and Peter Dale Scott, Penguin Books
- 1996: Talking to My Body by Anna Swir translated by Czesław Miłosz and Leonard Nathan, Copper Canyon Press

== See also ==
- List of Poles
- Polish literature
- List of Polish Nobel laureates
