= Miasto bez imienia =

Miasto bez imienia (The city without a name) - a volume of poems by Czesław Miłosz, published in 1969 by the Instytut Literacki in Paris as the 178th volume of the Kultura Library.

The titular poem is a reflection on the complicated history of Vilnius. A number of other poems from the volume, many from the time of Miłosz's professorship in California, reflect his thoughts on the United States and contemporary developments, including his polemic and critique of the 1960s counterculture he thought as politically naive and hypocritical (similar thoughts would be published in the collection of essays published in the same year, Widzenia nad Zatoką San Francisco).
