= Gucio zaczarowany =

- by Czesław Miłosz
- Country: France
- Language: Polish
- Publication date: 1965; 61 years ago

Gucio zaczarowany (lit. "The Enchanted Gucio" but translated to English as "Bobo's Metamorphosis") is a poetry collection by Czesław Miłosz. It was first published in 1965. The title is the same as a children book by Zofia Urbanowska which Miłosz liked as a child. Steven Serafin called this one of Miłosz's masterpieces.
