= To (play) =

To is a literary work, whose Polish title could be translated to It, by Czesław Miłosz. It was first published in 2000.
