= Jane Zielonko =

Polish-American translator

Jane Irene Zielonko (1922–1982) was the Polish-American translator of The Captive Mind (1953) by Czesław Miłosz, winner of the 1980 Nobel Prize in Literature. First published in Polish as Zniewolony umysł, the book examines the collaboration of intellectuals in the Eastern Bloc under Stalinism.

== Early life and education ==
Born to Polish immigrants, and resident in Philadelphia, Zielonko graduated in 1944 with an A.B. in English from the University of Pennsylvania and an A.M. in 1945 from Columbia University. Her master's thesis was titled "Some American Variants of Child Ballads".

== Work with Miłosz ==
After Columbia, Zielonko taught English language and literature at Smith College. She met Czesław Miłosz while he was working as a cultural attaché in the embassy of the communist Polish People's Republic in Washington, DC. Apparently they had a brief affair, which ended when Zielonko moved to Paris to study at the Sorbonne on a Fulbright scholarship. Miłosz was married; he was living in Washington with his wife, and his second child was born in 1951.

In December 1950, during a visit to Poland, Miłosz's passport was confiscated by the Polish government because of suspicions about his lack of ideological purity. In early 1951 the government nevertheless allowed him to visit Paris (apparently the foreign minister's wife was one of his supporters), where he defected. His family remained in the United States, but the American government denied him a visa because of fears about communist influence. At the same time, intellectuals in Paris were supportive of communism, which increased his sense of isolation. Zielonko, he wrote later, was one of the few people he could speak to about politics and literature who understood him.

Zielonko began translating The Captive Mind in the winter of 1951 and moved back to New York in early 1952. The two formed a close working relationship, although Miłosz said he "tormented" her during the translation: "friendship is one thing but when it comes to precision, I was implacable which, in reality, meant that I tormented her." According to scholar Bartłomiej Biegajło, Zielonko's translation "frequently violated" the source text, with both omissions and additions, to produce a smoothly written English edition. Biegajło writes that this was probably done with Miłosz's encouragement.

Miłosz described his work with Zielonko in his book Rok myśliwego (1989), which became one of the few sources of information about her. In that book Miłosz wrote that Zielonko had been suffering from a terminal illness at the time and saw the translation as a "test"; if she were able to complete it, it would mean she had beaten the disease.

== Later life ==
By 1968 Zielonko had married an American attorney, Frank Peel (1927–2018). In 2004 Peel wrote a letter to the Wall Street Journal pointing out that an article the newspaper had published about The Captive Mind had failed to mention Zielonko. In that letter, he noted that she had worked as an adviser to Radio Free Europe and that she had accompanied Miłosz to Stockholm when he was awarded the Nobel Prize in Literature in 1980. She died two years later.

== Translations ==
- (1953). Miłosz, Czesław. The Captive Mind. Trans. Jane Zielonko. New York: Alfred A. Knopf.
- (1968). Kołakowski, Leszek (1968). Political Thinking Beyond Politics: Toward a Marxist Humanism. Essays on the Left Today. Trans. Jane Zielonko Peel. New York: Grove Press.
- (1969). Kołakowski, Leszek (1969). Marxism and Beyond: On Historical Understanding and Individual Responsibility. Trans. Jane Zielonko Peel. London: Pall Mall Press.
