= Kroniki =

Kroniki (lit. The Chronicles) is a poetry collection by Czesław Miłosz. It was first published in 1987 by the Instytut Literacki (Literary Institute) in Paris.

The collection encompasses poems written between 1985 and 1987, including On Parting with My Wife, Janina and Six Lectures in Verse. In a 1994 interview, Miłosz recalled that Pope John Paul II had specifically discussed Six Lectures in Verse with him, telling the poet he made "one step forward, one step back" in approaching religious themes; Miłosz replied that he did not know how else it was possible to write religious poetry in the twentieth century. Scholars have described Kroniki as part of an unusually productive period in Miłosz's career, marked by creative energy as he approached his eightieth birthday and the sixtieth anniversary of his literary debut.
