= Druga przestrzeń =

2002 poem collection by Czesław Miłosz

Druga przestrzen ("The Second Space") is the last poetry collection by Czesław Miłosz. It was first published in 2002.

The collection has been studied in the religious context.
