= Król Popiel i inne wiersze =

- by Czesław Miłosz
- Country: France
- Language: Polish
- Publication date: 1962; 64 years ago

Król Popiel i inne wiersze (King Popiel and Other Poems) is a poetry collection by Polish poet Czesław Miłosz. It was first published in 1962 in Paris by Polish Literary Institute. There were underground editions of the book in Poland, also before 1989.

An entry in the Encyclopedia of American Poetry: The Twentieth Century notes that in the poems collected in this tome, "Milosz considered metaphysical questions, such as original sin, resurrection, and the relation of the particular to the universal", while placing "less emphasis on political concerns".
