= Hymn o Perle =

Hymn o Perle is a poetry collection in Polish by Czesław Miłosz which means "Hymn of the Pearl". It was first published in 1982.

The title may refer to Hymn of the Pearl, a passage of the apocryphal Acts of Thomas.
