= The Issa Valley =

- Directed by: Tadeusz Konwicki
- Written by: Tadeusz Konwicki
- Starring: Anna Dymna; Maria Pakulnis; Danuta Szaflarska; Edward Dziewoński; Krzysztof Gosztyła; Ewa Wiśniewska
- Cinematography: Jerzy Łukaszewicz
- Edited by: Krystyna Rutkowska
- Music by: Zygmunt Konieczny
- Release date: September 20, 1982
- Running time: 110 min
- Country: Poland
- Language: Polish

The Issa Valley (Polish: Dolina Issy) is a 1982 film adaptation of the 1955 novel by Czesław Miłosz, directed by Tadeusz Konwicki.

== See also ==
- Cinema of Poland
- List of Polish language films
