= Gdzie wschodzi słońce i kędy zapada =

Poetry collection

Gdzie slonce wschodzi i kedy zapada ("From the Rising of the Sun") is a poetry collection by Czesław Miłosz. It was first published in 1974. The title poem takes its name from a line of Psalm 113 of the Bible, rendered in the King James version as "From the rising of the sun unto the going down of the same the Lord's name is to be praised".

In a review of Milosz's collected works in The Guardian, Nicholas Wroe singled out the "stunning" final poem of From the Rising of the Sun, "Bells in Winter", saying that it "becomes an act of magnanimity, an act of salvation" and "culminates in an extraordinary Biblical vision of destruction and return".
