= Ocalenie =

Poetry collection by Czesław Miłosz

- by Czesław Miłosz
- First edition
- Country: Poland
- Language: Polish
- Publisher: Czytelnik Publishing House
- Publication date: 1945; 81 years ago

Ocalenie ([ɔt͡saˈlɛɲɛ]; 'Rescue') is a poetry collection by Czesław Miłosz. It was first published in 1945. Many of the poems collected were written in Warsaw during its Nazi occupation.

== Partial contents ==
- "World: Naïve Poems"—a sequence of pastoral poems
  - "By the Peonies"
- "Song on the End of the World"
- "Campo dei Fiori"—"a civic-minded poem about people’s indifference to the deaths of others"
- "The Voices of Poor People"—cycle
  - "A Poor Christian Looks at the Ghetto"
- "Dedication"
