= A Treatise on Poetry =

Poem by Czesław Miłosz

- by Czesław Miłosz
- Original title: Traktat poetycki
- Translator: Robert Hass
- Written: 1955–1956
- Country: France
- Language: Polish
- Publisher: Instytut Literacki
- Publication date: 1957; 69 years ago
- Published in English: 2001; 25 years ago

A Treatise on Poetry (Polish: Traktat poetycki) is book-length poem in Polish by Nobel Prize-winning poet Czesław Miłosz on Polish literature, poetry and history from 1900 to 1949. Written in 1955 and 1956, it was first published in book form in 1957 and won that year's literary prize from Kultura. The Treatise is considered one of Miłosz's greatest works.

== Contents ==
A Treatise on Poetry tells the history of Poland, particularly Polish poetry, during the first half of the 20th century. It is divided into four cantos, with a short introductory poem:

1. "Piękne czasy" ("Beautiful Times") - literary life in Kraków 1900–1914
2. "Stolica" ("Capital") - politics and poetry in Warsaw 1918–31 August 1939, ending the night before the German Invasion of Poland
3. "Duch dziejów" ("The Spirit of History") - Warsaw 1939–1945, and the poets killed in the Warsaw Uprising
4. "Natura" ("Nature") - Pennsylvania 1948–1949, with a poet reflecting on the history described in the first three sections.

== Publication ==
The original Polish version was written between 1955 and 1956 and was published as a book in 1957 in France by the Instytut Literacki.

Because of its form and its culturally-specific subject matter, Miłosz believed for some time that it could not be translated into English. Together with Robert Hass, however, Miłosz produced an English translation in 2001, with extensive notes and a new preface. It has been translated into several languages:

- Miłosz, Czesław (1982). Поэтический трактат (in Russian). Translated by Natalya Gorbanevskaya. Ann Arbor: Ardis.
- Miłosz, Czesław (1996). Traktáty a přednášky ve verších (in Czech). Olomouc: Votobia. ISBN 9788071981466.
- Miłosz, Czesław (2001). A Treatise on Poetry. Translated by Czesław Miłosz and Robert Hass. New York: Ecco Press. ISBN 978-0-06-018524-4.
- Miłosz, Czesław (2016). Traktater på vers (in Swedish). Translated by Jurek Hirschberg. H:ström Text & Kultur. ISBN 9789173272247.

== Reception ==
A Treatise on Poetry has been seen as one of Miłosz's greatest achievements. Writing for The New York Review of Books, Helen Vendler described the Treatise as one of the few poems "so powerful that it bursts the bounds in which it was written—the bounds of language, geography, epoch", writing that "to enter the current of this poem is to hurtle downstream through history on a flood of eloquent and passionate language that is in turn philosophic, satiric, tender, angry, ironic, sensuous, and, above all, elegiac".

In The Guardian, Charles Bainbridge singles out the third section, Warsaw 1939–1945, as "one of Milosz's most remarkable and moving pieces of writing. Full of compelling imagery and argument". Other reviews in English have described the Treatise as "gripping, profound and beautiful".

On its original release, the Treatise won the annual Kultura literary prize.

Miłosz won the Nobel Prize in Literature in 1980 for his literary works.

In 2001, Miłosz, who was pleased by the renewed appreciation of the Treatise following its English translation, said. "It has been a great pleasure to see my poem apparently not getting old.... I am proud of having written a poem that deals with historical, political and aesthetic issues."
