= The Captive Mind =

Polish non-fiction

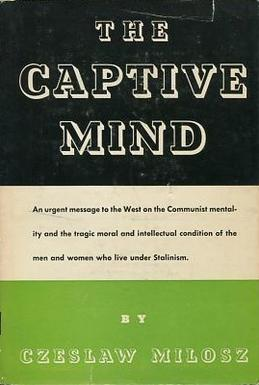
- First US edition
- Author: Czesław Miłosz
- Original title: Zniewolony umysł
- Translator: Jane Zielonko
- Language: Polish
- Publisher: Instytut Literacki
- Publication date: 1953
- Publication place: France
- English publication date: 1953 Knopf (US); Secker & Warburg (UK)
- Followed by: Zdobycie władzy

The Captive Mind (Polish: Zniewolony umysł) is a 1953 work of nonfiction by Polish writer, poet, academic and Nobel laureate Czesław Miłosz. It was first published in English in a translation by Jane Zielonko in 1953.

== Overview ==
The Captive Mind was written soon after the author's defection from Stalinist Poland in 1951. In it, Miłosz drew upon his experiences as an illegal author during the Nazi Occupation and of being a member of the ruling class of the postwar People's Republic of Poland. The book attempts to explain the allure of Stalinism to intellectuals, its adherents' thought processes, and the existence of both dissent and collaboration within the postwar Soviet Bloc. Miłosz described that he wrote the book "under great inner conflict".

=== Chapter I: The Pill of Murti-Bing ===
The book begins with a discussion of the dystopian novel Insatiability by Stanisław Ignacy Witkiewicz. In the novel, a new Mongol Empire conquers Poland and introduces Murti-Bing pills as a cure for independent thought. At first, the pills create contentment and blind obedience, but ultimately lead those taking them to develop dual personalities. Miłosz compares the pills to the intellectually deadening effects of Marxism-Leninism in the USSR and the Soviet Bloc.

=== Chapter II: Looking to the West ===
Miłosz describes how Western democracies were perceived with a mixture of contempt and fascination by Stalinist Central and Eastern Europe among intellectuals. Constraints put on politicians and policemen by the rule of law struck them as incomprehensible and inferior to the police states of the Communist world. Miłosz noted, however, that the same intellectuals who denounced Western consumerism in print would often read Western literature in search of something more worthy than in books published behind the Iron Curtain.

=== Chapter III: Ketman ===
This chapter draws upon the writings of Arthur de Gobineau, a 19th-century French diplomat assigned to present-day Iran. In his Religions and Philosophies of Central Asia, Gobineau describes the practice of Ketman, the act of paying lip service to Islam while concealing secret opposition. Describing the practice as widespread throughout the Islamic World, Gobineau quotes one of his informants as saying, "There is not a single true Moslem in Persia." Gobineau further describes the use of Ketman to secretly spread heterodox views to people who believe that they are being taught Islamic orthodoxy.

Miłosz describes seven forms of Ketman applied in the People's Republics of the 20th century:

1. National Ketman, the practice of publicly carrying Russian books and humming Russian songs while privately believing "Socialism-yes, Russia-no." Miłosz described this form of Ketman as extremely widespread among Polish intellectuals who sprang from working-class families. Such beliefs, however, were considered Titoism by the Polish government and therefore were kept hidden.
2. The Ketman of Revolutionary Purity, the secret belief that Joseph Stalin betrayed the teachings of Vladimir Lenin by instituting mass terror, forced collectivism, GULAG concentration camps, and smothering literature and the arts by tolerating only Socialist Realism. This Ketman's followers believed that a new literary and artistic flowering would follow the end of World War II and that Stalin must not only be tolerated but supported until then. Miłosz writes, "This variety of Ketman was widespread if not universal in Russia during the Second World War, and its present form is a rebirth of an already once-deceived hope."
3. Aesthetic Ketman, the practice of escaping from Socialist Realism by secretly filling one's life with art, literature, and music of past ages. Miłosz writes, "In these conditions, aesthetic Ketman has every possibility of spreading. It is expressed in an unconscious longing for strangeness which is channeled toward controlled amusements like theater, film, and folk festivals, but also into various forms of escapism. Writers burrow into ancient texts, comment on and re-edit ancient authors. They write children's books so that their fancy may have a slightly freer play. Many choose university careers because research into literary history offers a safe pretext for plunging into the past and for conversing with works of great aesthetic value. The number of translators of former prose and poetry multiplies. Painters seek an outlet for their interests in illustrations for children's books, where the choice of gaudy colors can be justified by an appeal to the naive imaginations of children. Stage managers, doing their duty by presenting bad contemporary works, endeavor to introduce into their repertoires the plays of Lope de Vega or Shakespeare --that is, those of their plays that are approved by the Center."
4. Professional Ketman, the reluctant acceptance of Stalinist standards only to allow one to continue to pursue a desired career path. This is based on the idea of having only a single life and therefore using the time to the best of one's ability to pursue artistic or scientific innovation, which requires at least tolerating Socialist Realism and other such censorship standards in order to continue one's work.
5. Skeptical Ketman, the belief that the Russian attempt to correct the world's social inequalities through Communism is intriguing but is beyond human capabilities, and therefore, only once this attempt has failed can the world return to rationalism. This skepticism was most prominent in intellectual circles, simply attributing Stalinism's actions to a sort of temporary insanity whereupon being seized by a modicum of enlightenment, the Russians tried to realize the potential of equality but were simply intellectually incapable of pursuing it any other way beyond excessive, often overtly harmful dogmatism.
6. Metaphysical Ketman, the idea that the current context dictates that one temporarily dismiss the metaphysical world's importance (namely in regards to Catholicism, as this Ketman predominately appears in countries with Catholic pasts like Poland). This appears in several ways such as temporarily abandoning one's belief system while performing contradictory actions or maintaining Catholic institutions even if they are stripped of metaphysical significance, so long as one maintains the correct rationale in doing so.
7. Ethical Ketman, the attempt to offset unethical actions in service of Stalinism by compensating with overly helpful and honorable action in one's personal life. Most often this appears in high-ranking members of the Communist Party who justify mass killings based on the rigid morality of Stalinism—that any action in service to the Revolution is inherently good and any action harmful to it is inherently bad -—but still feel some sort of guilt and so try to act very ethically in personal interactions to counteract one's political actions.

=== Chapter IV: Alpha, the Moralist ===
Under the alias of Alpha, Miłosz describes the life of Polish author Jerzy Andrzejewski and how he came to collaborate with Stalinism in Poland. Before the Second World War, Andrzejewski had been widely admired as the author of Catholic novels and considered himself a follower of Jacques Maritain. Miłosz expresses a belief, however, that Andrzejewski's Catholic faith was only skin deep.

Under Nazi Occupation of Poland, Andrzejewski was a leader of the literary wing of the Polish underground state. In this capacity, he wrote many short stories and gave many underground literary readings that won many recruits and strengthened the morale of the Polish Home Army. Miłosz also describes how, upon returning to Poland's capital after the Warsaw Uprising, he and Andrzejewski walked together through the rubble and ruins of the city. Miłosz then expresses a belief that Andrejewski's belief in the values of honor, patriotism, and loyalty had been destroyed by the horrors of the Uprising.

After the war, Andrzejewski began writing and, as the new Polish state began slowly demanding blind obedience from him, he obeyed without question. Andrzejewski even publicly denounced his past writing for deviating from Socialist Realism. Despite having once written Catholic novels, Andrzejewski willingly accepts a position making speeches that denounce the Vatican. After that, other intellectuals began calling Andrzejewski, "the respectable prostitute."

=== Chapter V: Beta, The Disappointed Lover ===
In 1942 Miłosz first encountered Tadeusz Borowski at an underground literary reading in occupied Warsaw. At the time, Borowski was writing poetry striking for its Nihilistic tone. In 1943 Borowski was arrested by the Gestapo and ultimately imprisoned in Auschwitz.

With extensive quotations from Borowski's short stories, Miłosz describes how the former poet survived by being assigned to help unload the transports of Jews who were bound for the gas chambers. In return, Borowski was allowed to keep their food and clothing for himself. Miłosz expresses a belief that Borowski's stories should be required reading for anyone who wishes to understand totalitarianism.

After the war, Borowski returned to Poland and, like Andrzejewski, became a propagandist for the ruling party. Eventually, however, he became disillusioned and fell into a crippling depression. After making several statements about the 1930 suicide of disillusioned Soviet poet Vladimir Mayakovsky, Borowski took his own life. Despite his doubts, his funeral was exploited for propaganda by Poland's Stalinist government.

=== Chapter VI: Gamma, the Slave of History ===
This chapter discusses the life of Jerzy Putrament in particular.

=== Chapter VII: Delta, the Troubadour ===
This chapter describes the life of Konstanty Ildefons Gałczyński.

The book elaborates the idea of "enslavement through consciousness" in the penultimate chapter, and closes with a pained and personal assessment of the fate of the Baltic nations in particular.

== Reception ==
The Captive Mind was an immediate success that brought Miłosz international renown.

Reviewing the work in 1953 for The New York Times upon the publication of the book’s English translation, Peter Viereck wrote “The Captive Mind is the most important soul-searching ever published about… [the] love-hate ambivalence between communism and uprooted intellectuals.”

While reading The Captive Mind, Polish author Witold Gombrowicz, who had been living in Buenos Aires since before the Second World War, had known most of the writers whom Miłosz described in the coffeehouses and literary cafes of Pre-War Warsaw. As he read, Gombrowicz confided in his diary, "Miłosz tells the history of the bankruptcy of literature in Poland smoothly, and I ride his book straight through that streamlined cemetery, just as, two days ago, I rode the bus along the asphalt highway."

Gombrowicz further commented, "I am not aghast at the change in living conditions, the fall of states, the annihilation of cities and other surprise geysers spurting out of the womb of History, but the fact that a fellow whom I knew as X suddenly becomes Y, changes his personality like a jacket and begins to act speak, think, and feel contrary to himself fills me full of fear and embarrassment. What a terrible shamelessness! What a ridiculous demise! To become a gramophone onto which is put a record with the label, 'His Master's Voice'? What a grotesque fate for these writers!"

The book is described by historian Norman Davies as a "devastating study" which "totally discredited the cultural and psychological machinery of Communism". The book has been compared to Arthur Koestler's Darkness at Noon and George Orwell's Nineteen Eighty-Four in that it, too, represents the view of an insider who draws on extensive analysis.

But upon the book's reissue in paperback in 1982, Linda Ray Pratt, writing in The Boston Phoenix, declared that the book "ought to be an anachronism": "The Captive Mind makes a narrow and simplistic argument that tends to see all writers who followed a path different from Milosz’s as acting out of literary ambition and all communists as neurotics who evolved into unfeeling bureaucrats and then cracked up… The Captive Mind is not worthy of Milosz… [It's] a book that divides and distorts… Propaganda mills need whole logs to fuel them, but readers looking to understand the history of postwar Europe will look to other sources for enlightenment."

In 2017 Milosz’s biographer Andrzej Franaszek said in an essay in The New York Times: “Perhaps a decade ago, it would have been easy to pass off The Captive Mind as a relic of the totalitarian 20th century: However, the last decade has demonstrated how the mechanisms of mind control Milosz exposed continue to be deployed throughout the globe.”

Miłosz said of the book: "It was considered by anti-communists as suspect because I didn't attack strongly enough the communists. I tried to understand the processes and they didn't like that. And it also created the idea, particularly in the West, that I was a political writer. This was a misunderstanding because my poetry was unknown. I have never been a political writer and I worked hard to destroy this image of myself."
