= Šeteniai =

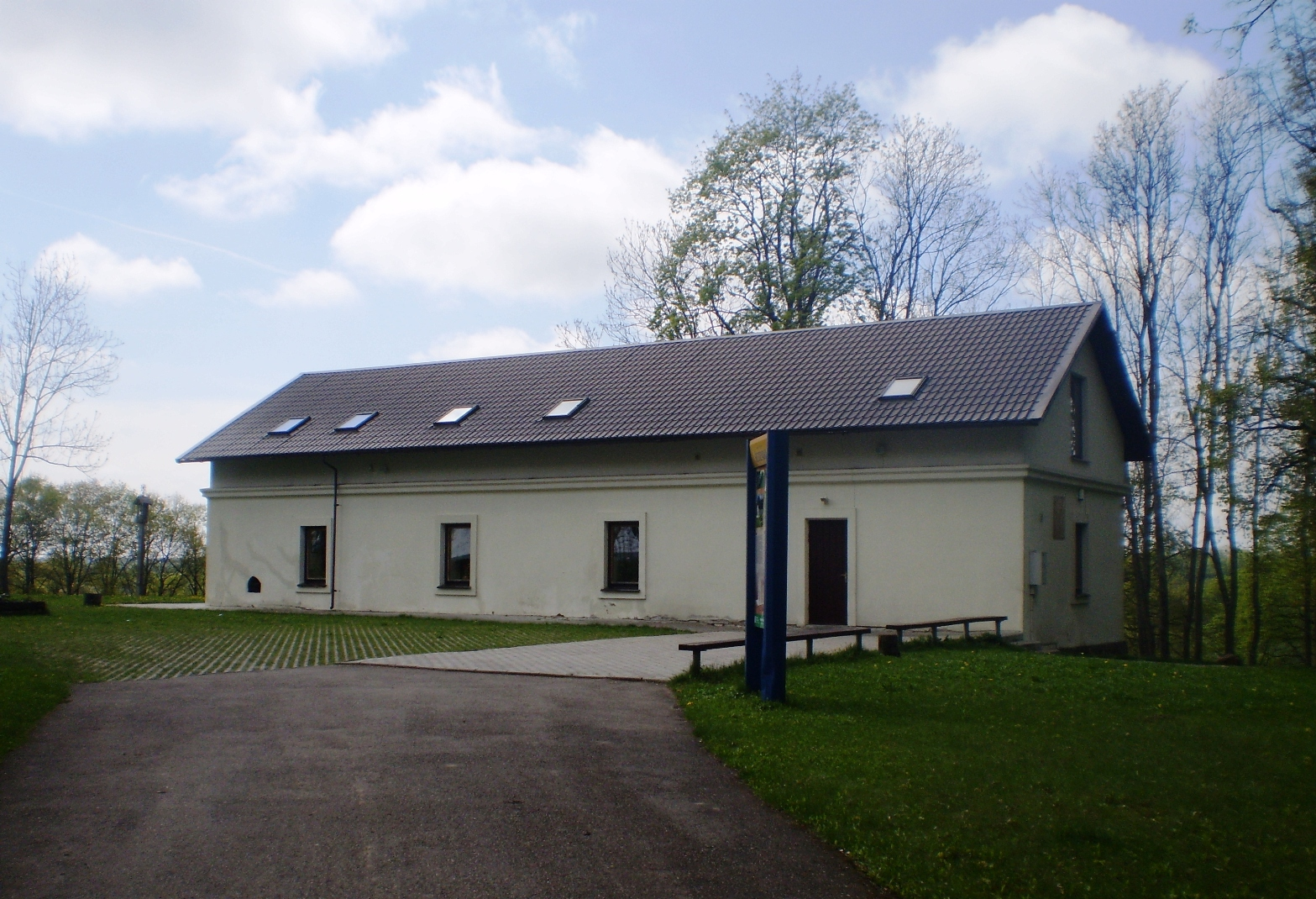
- Czesław Miłosz Cultural Center

- Location of Šeteniai Šeteniai (Lithuania)
- Coordinates: 55°23′41″N 24°01′58″E
- Country: Lithuania
- Ethnographic region: Aukštaitija
- County: Kaunas County
- Municipality: Kėdainiai district municipality
- Eldership: Vilainiai Eldership

Population (2011)
  - Total: 31
- Time zone: UTC+2 (EET)
  - Summer (DST): UTC+3 (EEST)

Šeteniai (formerly Šateiniai) is a village in the Kėdainiai District Municipality, Lithuania. According to the 2011 census, the village had a population of 31 people. It is situated 13 kilometres (8.1 mi) north of Kėdainiai, on the left bank of the Nevėžis River, next to the Vilainiai–Šventybrastis–Krekenava road.

Šeteniai is the birthplace of the Polish poet Czesław Miłosz. The Czesław Miłosz Cultural Center with an exhibition dedicated to Miłosz was opened on June 12, 1999. The Cultural Center is located in the former barn of the manor where Miłosz was born. The Cultural Center is used for cultural activities, conferences, and meetings. It is surrounded by a park showcasing wood carvings by international artists.

Šeteniai is also the birthplace of Juozas Urbšys, a prominent interwar Lithuanian diplomat and the last Minister of Foreign Affairs in independent interwar Lithuania.

== History ==
The Šeteniai Manor was likely established in the early 18th century. At the end of the 19th century there were 2 folwarks in Šeteniai, one was a property of the Siručiai (owners of the Sirutiškis manor), another was a property of the Kognovickiai (the Lančiūnava manor). Buildings of the former manor were destroyed in the 1950s.

== Demographics ==
Historical population

Year	Pop.	±% p.a.
1806	103	—
1902	222	+0.80%
1923	221	−0.02%
1959	129	−1.48%
1970	75	−4.81%

Year	Pop.	±% p.a.
1979	40	−6.75%
1987	39	−0.32%
1989	40	+1.27%
2001	35	−1.11%
2011	31	−1.21%

Source: 1806, 1902, 1923, 1959 & 1970, 1979, 1989, 2001, 2011

== Notable people ==
- Juozas Urbšys (1896–1991), last interbellum Lithuanian Minister of Foreign Affairs
- Czesław Miłosz (1911–2004), Polish poet, writer and translator, Nobel Prize laureate

== Images ==
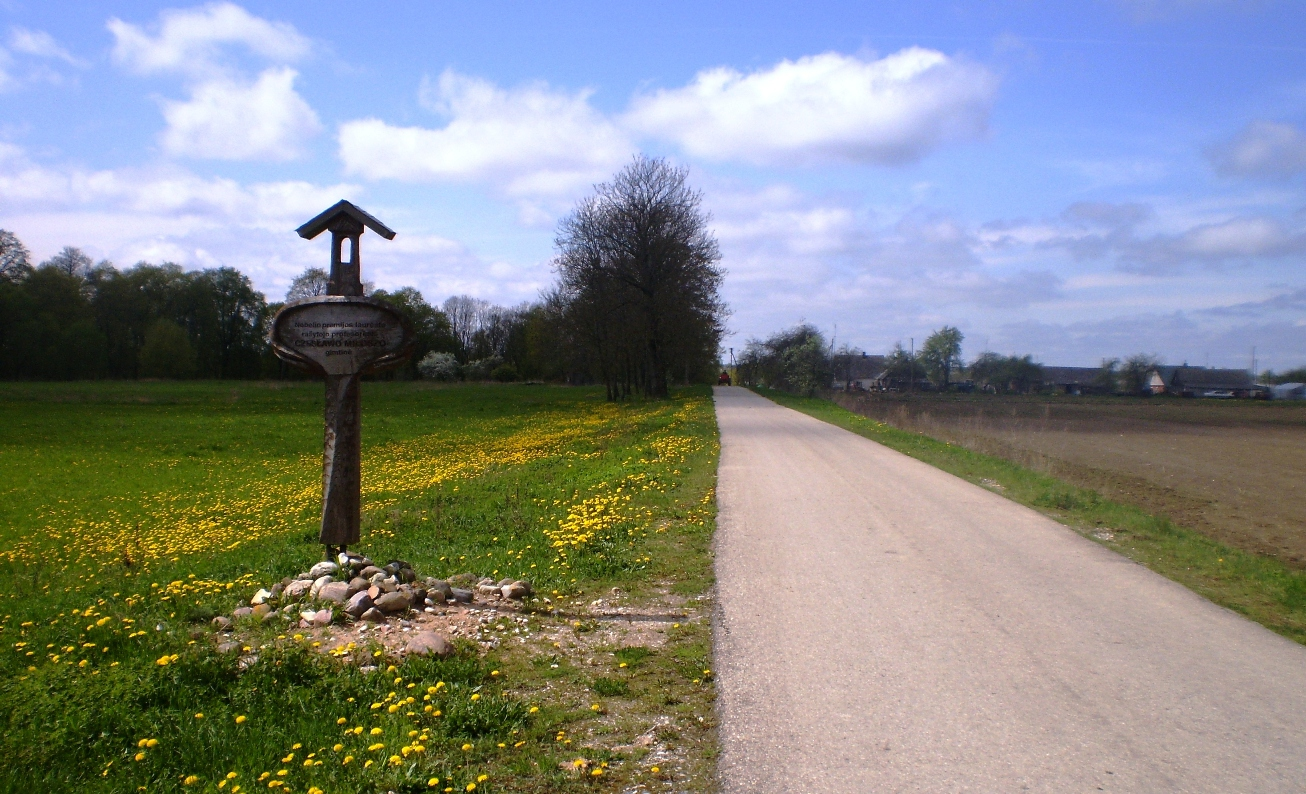
Entrance into Šateniai

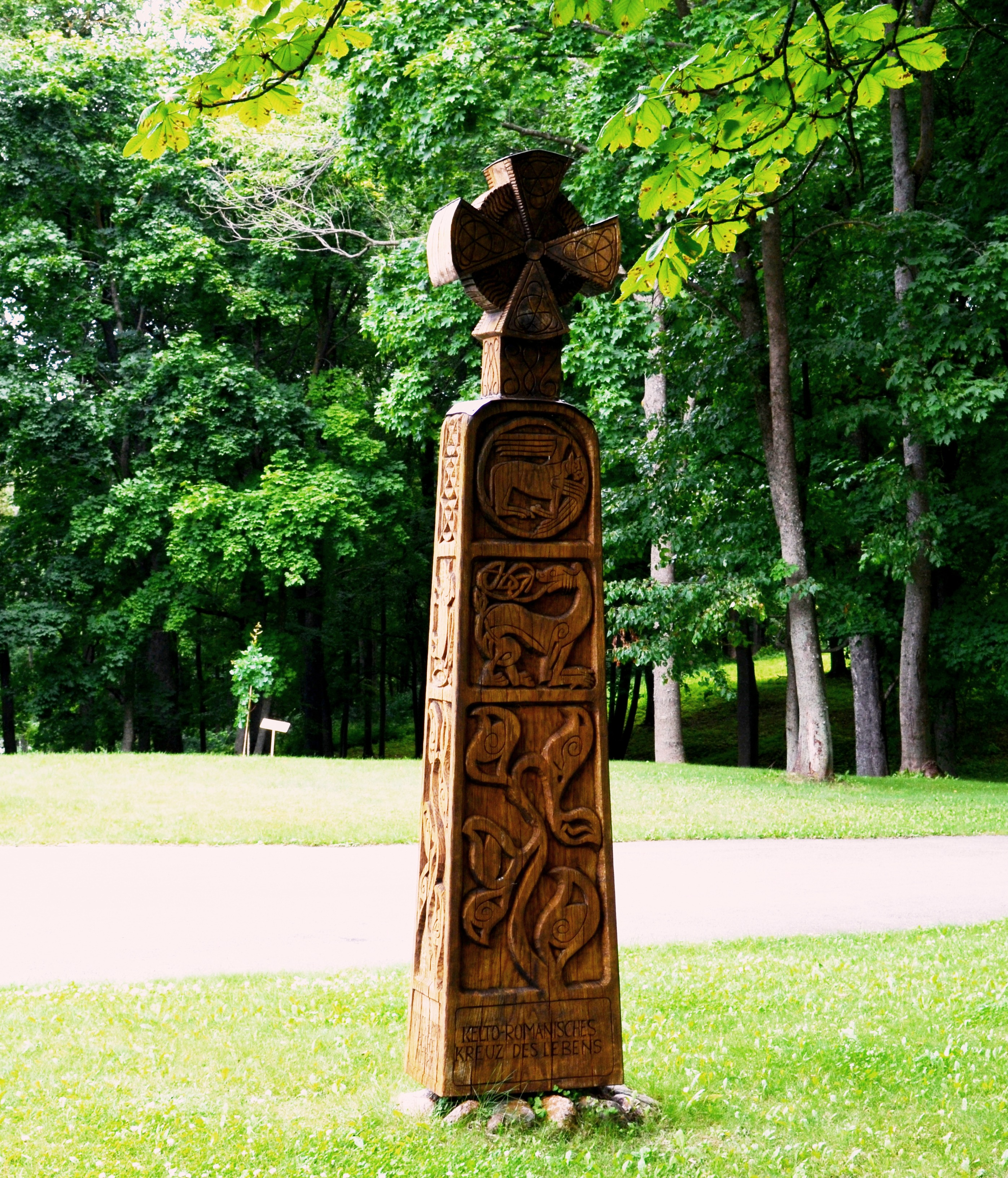
A Celtic cross in the Šateniai park

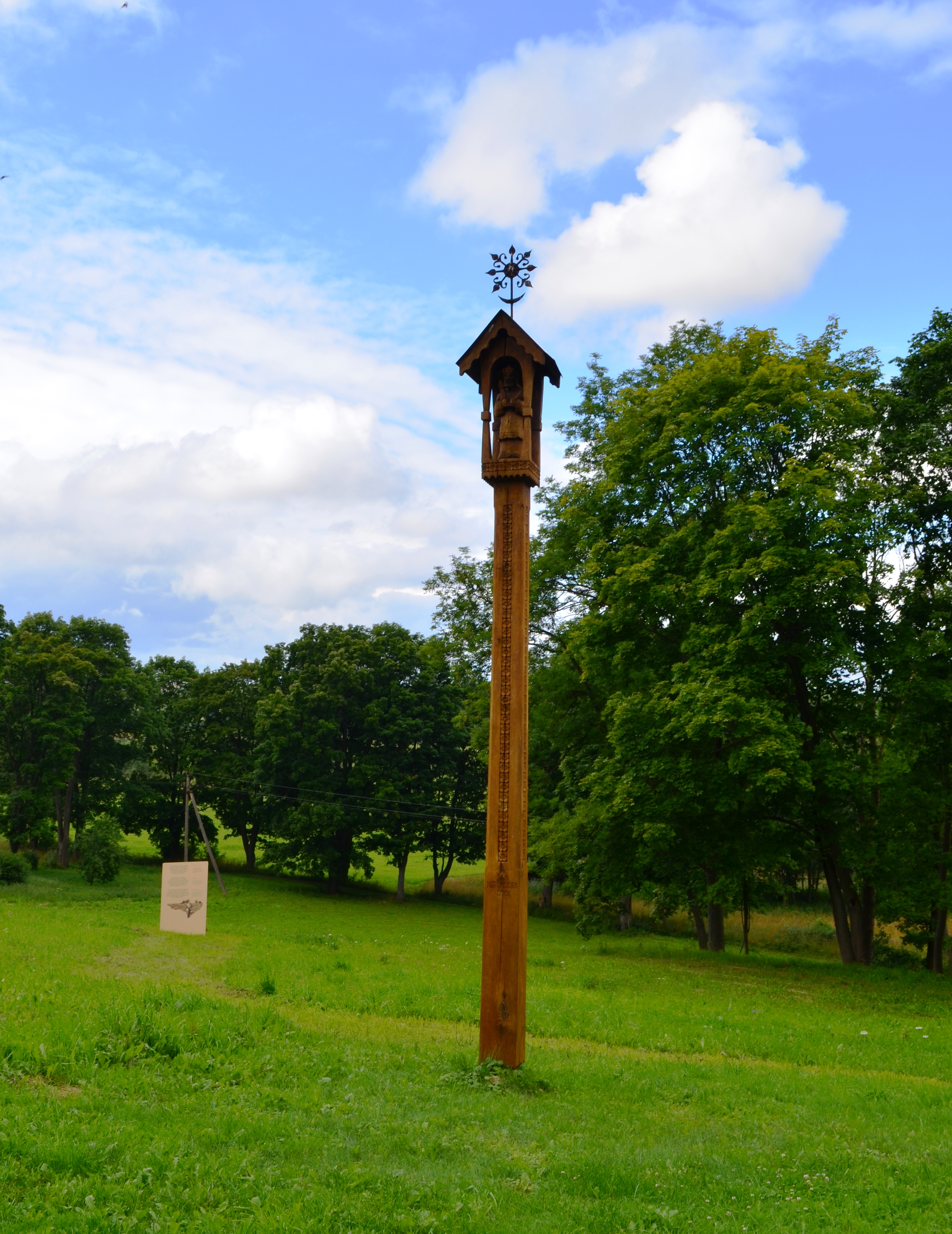
A roofed pole in the Šateniai park
