= Teodor Bujnicki =

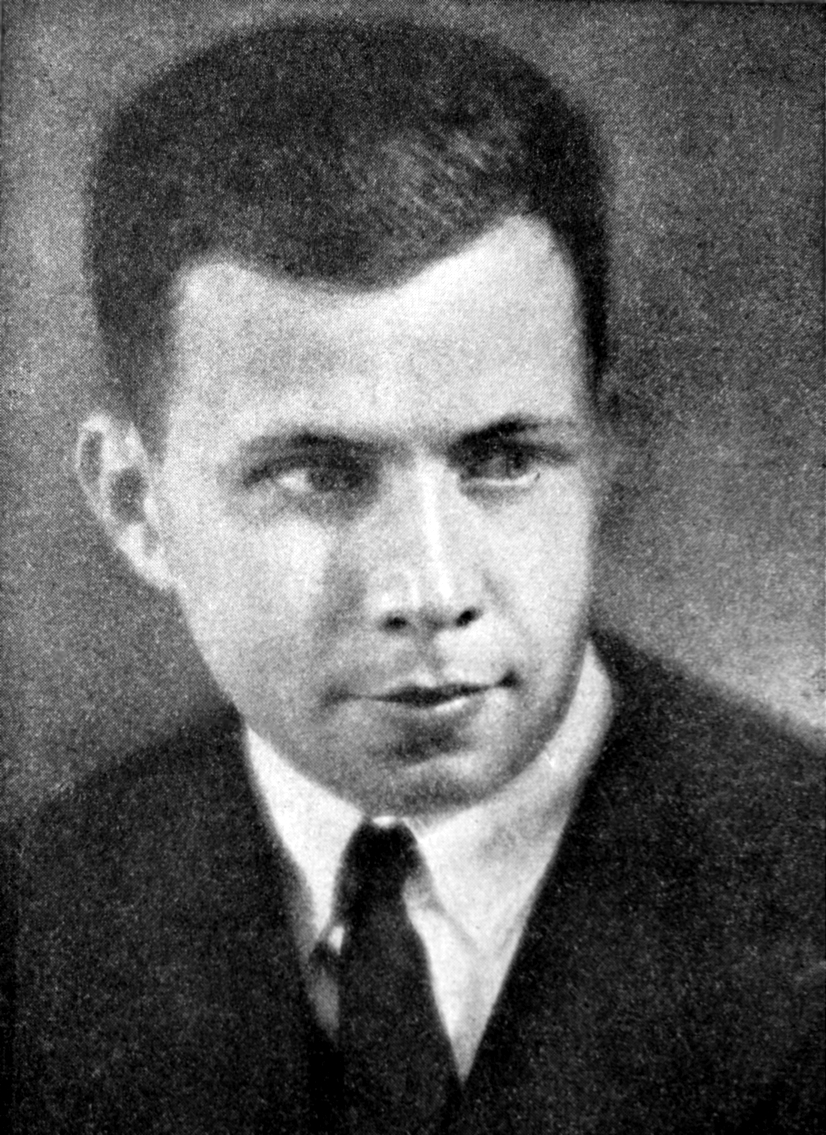
Teodor Bujnicki

Teodor Bujnicki (13 December 1907 – 27 November 1944) was a Polish poet and a member of the literary group Żagary.

During World War II, Bujnicki was condemned for "collaboration with Soviet occupants" in Vilnius after Lithuania's incorporation into the USSR. The reason for this was that he published several critical articles about the Polish pre-war authorities and the Sanation regime as the editor of a Polish-language Soviet journal. For this, Bujnicki was sentenced to death in absentia for treason by the Polish Underground State in Vilnius in 1942. However, he avoided execution, as he fled from Vilnius and hid by living with relatives in Panevėžys and Palanga, during Nazi Germany's occupation of Lithuania.

The cultural director of the Union of Polish Patriots, Bujnicki returned to Vilnius continued working as the editor of the journal after the city was retaken by the Red Army in 1944. As the sentence from 1942 was never changed nor appealed, he was shot and mortally wounded by Waldemar Butkiewicz, a soldier of the Polish Home Army, on 27 November 1944 in Vilnius.

By the resolution of the Presidium of the State National Council of 18 January 1946 "in recognition of his merits for the benefit of the Republic of Poland in organizing the Soviet Polonia on the ideological platform of the Union of Polish Patriots", he was posthumously awarded the Order of the Cross of Grunwald, 3rd class.

== Selected works ==
- Po omacku, collection of poems (1933)
- 18 ohydnych paszkwilów na Wilno i Wilnian (1934)
- Pamiątki historyczne Wileńszczyzny i Nowogródzczyzny (1935)
- W połowie drogi, collection of poems (1937)
- Majówka w Afryce, posthumously (1950)
- Wybór wierszy, posthumously (1950)
