= List of Specialist Classical Albums Chart number ones of the 2020s =

This is a list of the number-one albums of the Specialist Classical Albums Chart during the 2020s.

== Number ones ==
Artist (Note: The artist, album, date of reaching number one and number of weeks at number one are those given by the Official Charts Company.)	Album	Record label (Note: The record labels are those given by the Official Charts Company.)	Reached number one	Weeks at number one
2020
Gareth Malone	Music for Healing	Decca	21 November 2019	8
Stephen Hough	Brahms:The Final Piano Pieces	Hyperion	16 January 2020	1
Sheku Kanneh-Mason, the London Symphony Orchestra and Sir Simon Rattle	Elgar	Decca	23 January 2020	6
Stephen Fry, Debbie Wiseman and the National Symphony Orchestra	The Mythos Suite	Decca	28 February 2020	1
Sheku Kanneh-Mason, the London Symphony Orchestra and Sir Simon Rattle	Elgar	Decca	6 March 2020	4
Víkingur Ólafsson	Debussy/Rameau	Deutsche Grammophon	3 April 2020	5
Stephen Hough/Finnish Radio Symphony Orchestra/Hannu Lintu	Beethoven: Piano Concertos	Hyperion	8 May 2020	1
Ludovico Einaudi	12 Songs from Home	Decca	15 May 2020	1
Stjepan Hauser	Classic	Sony Classical	22 May 2020	1
Sean Shibe	Bach	Delphian	29 May 2020	1
Alina Ibragimova and Vladimir Jurowski	Shostakovich/Violin concerto	Hyperion	5 June 2020	1
Sean Shibe	Bach	Delphian	12 June 2020	1
Jonas Kaufmann	Verdi/Otell	Sony Classical	19 June 2020	1
Sean Shibe	Bach	Delphian	26 June 2020	1
Piers Lane/The Orchestra Now/Leon Botstein	The Romantic Piano Concerto Vol. 81	Hyperion	3 July 2020	1
Sheku Kanneh-Mason, the London Symphony Orchestra and Sir Simon Rattle	Elgar	Decca	10 July 2020	3
Voces8	After Silence	VCM	31 July 2020	1
Sinfonia of London/John Wilson	Respighi/Fontane De Roma/Pini De/Fesse	Chandos	7 August 2020	1
Nicola Benedetti	Elgar/Violin Concerto	Decca	14 August 2020	2
Suzi Digby/Ora Singers	Thomas Tallis: Spem In Alium/James Macmillan: Vidi Aquam	Harmonia Mundi	28 August 2020	1
Craig Armstrong/Calum Martin	The Edge of the Sea	BMG	4 September 2020	1
Lang Lang	Bach/Goldberg Variations	Deutsche Grammophon	11 September 2020	2
Sheku Kanneh-Mason, the London Symphony Orchestra and Sir Simon Rattle	Elgar	Decca	25 September 2020	1
Ermonela Jaho	Anima Rara	Opera Rara	2 October 2020	2
Black Dyke Band/Nicholas Childs	Rutter/Anthems Hymns & Gloria For Brass	Naxos	16 October 2020	1
Poor Clares of Arundel	Light for the World	Decca	23 October 2020	10
2021
Choir of King's College, Cambridge	Carols From King's - 2020 Collection	King's College Cambridge	1 January 2021	1
Poor Clares of Arundel	Light for the World	Decca	8 January 2021	9
Pat Metheny	Road to the Sun	BMG	12 March 2021	1
Steven Osborne and Paul Lewis	French Duets	Hyperion	19 March 2021	2
Lise Davidsen, London Philharmonic and Mark Elder	Bethoven/Wagner/Verdi	Decca	2 April 2021	1
Poor Clares of Arundel	Light for the World	Decca	9 April 2021	1
Max Richter	Voices 2	Decca	16 April 2021	1
Freddie De Tommaso/London Philharmonic Orchestra/Renato Balsadonna	Passione	Decca	23 April 2021	2
Alina Ibragimova	Paganini/24 Caprices	Hyperion	7 May 2021	1
Freddie De Tommaso/London Philharmonic Orchestra/Renato Balsadonna	Passione	Decca	14 May 2021	1
Lucy Crowe/The English Concert/Harry Bicket	Handel/Rodelinda	Linn	21 May 2021	1
Freddie De Tommaso/London Philharmonic Orchestra/Renato Balsadonna	Passione	Decca	28 May 2021	1
Leif Ove Andsnes/Mahler Chamber Orchestra	Mozart Momentum - 1785	Sony Classical	4 June 2021	1
Andras Schiff/Orchestra of the Age of Enlightenment	Brahms/Piano Concertos	ECM New Series	11 June 2021	1
Helen Mirren/Damian Lewis	Wisemen/The Music of Kings & Queens	Classic FM	18 June 2021	1
Andras Schiff/Orchestra of the Age of Enlightenment	Brahms/Piano Concertos	ECM New Series	25 June 2021	1
Boston Symphony Orchestra/Andris Nelson	Shostakovich/Symphonies Nos 1, 14 & 15	Deutsche Grammophon	2 July 2021	1
Angela Hewitt	Love Songs	Hyperion	9 July 2021	1
Isata Kanneh-Mason	Summertime	Decca	16 July 2021	1
Nicola Benedetti	Baroque	Decca	23 July 2021	3
Max Richter/Baltic Sea Philharmonic/Kristjan Järvi	Exiles	Deutsche Grammophon	13 August 2021	2
Sean Shibe	Camino	Pentatone	27 August 2021	1
Voces8	Infinity	Decca	3 September 2021	1
Víkingur Ólafsson	Mozart & Contemporaries	Deutsche Grammophon	10 September 2021	1
Janine Jansenn	12 Stradivari	Decca	17 September 2021	1
Víkingur Ólafsson	Mozart & Contemporaries	Deutsche Grammophon	24 September 2021	3
Daniil Trifonov	Bach/The Art of Life	Deutsche Grammophon	15 October 2021	1
Dunedin Concert/John Butt	Bach/Ich habe genug/Cantatas	Decca	22 October 2021	1
Víkingur Ólafsson	Mozart & Contemporaries	Deutsche Grammophon	29 October 2021	1
Stephen Hough	Chopin/Nocturnes	Hyperion	5 November 2021	1
Sheku Kanneh-Mason and Isata Kanneh-Mason	Muse	Decca	12 November 2021	4
Choir of King's College, Cambridge	In the Bleak Midwinter - Christmas Carols	King's College Cambridge	10 December 2021	1
Sheku Kanneh-Mason and Isata Kanneh-Mason	Muse	Decca	17 December 2021	1
Choir of King's College, Cambridge	In the Bleak Midwinter - Christmas Carols	King's College Cambridge	24 December 2021	2
2022
Sheku Kanneh-Mason and Isata Kanneh-Mason	Muse	Decca	7 January 2022	1
Lise Davidsen and Leif Ove Andsnes	Edvard Grieg	Decca	14 January 2022	2
Ludovico Einaudi	Underwater	Decca	28 January 2022	20
Max Richter	The New Four Seasons – Recomposed Vivaldi Recomposed	Deutsche Grammophon	17 June 2022	2
Freddie De Tommaso/Philharmonia Orchestra/Paolo Arrivabeni	Il Tenore	Decca	1 July 2022	1
Ludovico Einaudi	Underwater	Decca	8 July 2022	8
Alison Balsom	Quiet City	Warner Classics	2 September 2022	1
Ludovico Einaudi	Underwater	Decca	9 September 2022	5
Víkingur Ólafsson	From Afar	Deutsche Grammophon	14 October 2022	1
Ludovico Einaudi	Underwater	Decca	21 October 2022	7
Choir of King's College, Cambridge	Carols from King's College, Cambridge	Warner Classics	9 December 2022	5
2023
Ludovico Einaudi	Underwater	Decca	12 January 2023	3
Franz Welser-Möst	Neujahrskonzert 2023	Sony Classical	3 February 2023	1
Sinfonia of London, John Wilson	Ralph Vaughan Williams: Fantasia On a Theme by Thomas Tallis; Herbert Howells; Concerto for String Orchestra; Frederick Delius: Late Swallows; Sir Edward Elgar: Introduction and Allegro	Chandos	10 February 2023	2
Christina Pluhar, L' Arpeggiata and Philppe Jaroussky	Passacalle de la Follie	Erato	24 February 2023	1
Seong-Jin Cho	Handel/Brahms/The Handel Project	Deutsche Grammophon	3 March 2023	1
Martyn Brabbins and BBC Scottish Symphony Orchestra	Vaughan Williams/Sinfonia Antartica	Hyperion	10 March 2023	1
Orchestra dell'Accademia Nazionale di Santa Cecilia and Antonio Pappano	Puccini/Turandot	Warner Classics	17 March 2023	2
Jessye Norman	The Unreleased Masters	Decca	31 March 2023	1
John Wilson/Sinfonia of London	Rachmaninoff/Symphony No.2	Chandos	7 April 2023	1
On Bordeaux Aquitaine/Dumas	Bangalter/Mythologies	Erato	14 April 2023	1
Eric Whitacre/Voces8	Home	Decca	21 April 2023	1
Los Angeles Philharmonic/Gustavo Dudamel	Ades/Dante	NoneSuch	28 April 2023	1
Chad Lawson	Breathe	Decca	5 May 2023	1
Bham Voices/CBSO/Martyn Brabbins	Stanford/Requiem	Hyperion	12 May 2023	1
Karim Sulayman/Sean Shibe	Broken Branches	Pentatone	19 May 2023	1
Sufjan Stevens/Timo Andres/Conor Hanick	Reflections	Asthmatic Kitty	26 May 2023	1
Isata Kanneh-Mason	Childhood Tales	Decca	2 June 2023	1
Gesualdo Six/Owain Park	Byrd/Mass for Five Voices	Hyperion	9 June 2023	1
John Wilson and BBC Philharmonic	Coates/Orchestral Works Vol.3	Chandos	16 June 2023	1
Chad Lawson	Breathe	Decca	23 June 2023	2
Debbie Wiseman/City of Birmingham Symphony Orchestra	Signature	Silva Classics	7 July 2023	1
Karl Jenkins	One World	Decca	14 July 2023	1
Hilary Hahn	Eugène Ysaÿe Six Sonatas for Violin Solo Op.27	Deutsche Grammophon	21 July 2023	1
Bojan Cicic	Bach/Partitas & Sonatas Bwv 1001-1006	Delphian	28 July 2023	1
Chad Lawson	Breathe	Decca	4 August 2023	2
Francesa Dego/Timothy Ridout/Laura van der Heijden/Federico Colli	Mozart/The Piano Quartetes	Chandos	18 August 2023	1
Chad Lawson	Breathe	Decca	25 August 2023	1
Westminster Abbey Choir School/James O'Donnell	Vaughan Williams/Tavener/Macmillan	Hyperion	1 September 2023	1
Yuja Wang/Los Angeles Philharmonic and Gustavo Dudamel	Rachmaninoff/Piano Concertos/Paganini Rhapsody	Deutsche Grammophon	8 September 2023	2
Sinfonia of London/John Wilson	Rodgers and Hammerstein's Oklahoma! - OST	Chandos	22 September 2023	1
Joe Hisaishi/Royal Philharmonic Orchestra	Hisaishi/a Symphonic Celebration	Deutsche Grammophon	29 September 2023	1
Anna Lapwood	Luna	Sony Classical	6 October 2023	1
Víkingur Ólafsson	J.S Bach/Goldberg Variations	Deutsche Grammophon	13 October 2023	4
John Wilson and Sinfonia of London	Ravel/Daphnis et Chloe	Chandos	10 November 2023	1
Víkingur Ólafsson	J.S Bach/Goldberg Variations	Deutsche Grammophon	17 November 2023	9
2024
Vienna Philharmonic/Christian Thielemann	Neujahrskonzert 2024/New Year's Concert	Sony Classical	19 January 2024	1
Jonathan Tetelman	The Great Puccini	Deutsche Grammophon	26 January 2024	1
Philip Glass	Solo	Orange Mountain Music	2 February 2024	1
Marc-Andre Hamelin	Hamelin/New Piano Works	Hyperion	9 February 2024	1
Sinfonia of London/John Wilson	Ravel/Berkeley/Pounds/Orchestral Works	Chandos	16 February 2024	1
Théotime Langlois de Swarte/Le Consort	Vivaldi/Concerti Per Una Vita	Harmonia Mundi	23 February 2024	1
Simon O' Neil/London Symphony Orchestra/Simon Rattle	Janacek/Katya Kabanova	LSO Live	1 March 2024	1
Lang Lang/Andris Nelsons/Leipzig Gewandhaus Orchestra	Saint-Saëns	Deutsche Grammophon	8 March 2024	6
Boris Faust/Alexander Melnikov/Jakub Hrusa	Britten/Violin Concerto Chamber Works	Harmonia Mundi	19 April 2024	1
Yunchan Lim	Chopin/Etudes Opp 10 & 25	Decca	26 April 2024	1
Gabrieli/Paul McCreesh	Elgar/The Dream of Gerontius	Decca	3 May 2024	1
Yunchan Lim	Chopin/Etudes Opp 10 & 25	Decca	10 May 2024	1
Stephen Moccio	Legends Myths and Lavender	Decca	17 May 2024	2
Poor Clares of Arundel	My Peace I Give You	Decca	31 May 2024	1
Nicola Benedetti/Benjamin Grosvenor	Beethoven/Triple Concerto	Decca	7 June 2024	1
Janine Jansen/Klaus Mäkelä	Sibelius Prokofiev 1/Violin Concertos	Decca	14 June 2024	1
Poor Clares of Arundel	My Peace I Give You	Decca	21 June 2024	1
Pavel Kolesnikov/samson Tsoy	Schubert/Desyatnikov/Works for Piano	Harmonia Mundi	28 June 2024	1
Mishka Rushdie Momen	Reformation	Hyperion	5 July 2024	2
BBC Philharmonic/John Wilson	Coates/Orchestral Works - Vol 4	Chandos	19 July 2024	1
Stephen Moccio	Legends Myths and Lavender	Decca	26 July 2024	1
Aigul Akhmetshina/Royal Philharmonic Orchestra	Aigul	Decca	2 August 2024	1
Joana Mallwitz	The Kurt Weill Album	Deutsche Grammophon	9 August 2024	1
Karl Jenkins	Stravaganza	Decca	16 August 2024	1
Klaus Mäkelä	Shostakovich/Symphonies 4 5 & 6	Decca	23 August 2024	1
Nicolas Daniel/Julius Drake	Schumann/Work For Oboe & Piano	Chandos	30 August 2024	1
Danish String Quartet	Keel Road	ECM New Series	6 September 2024	1
Max Richter	In a Landscape	Decca	13 September 2024	17
2025
Martin Owen/BBC Philharmonic	Gipps:Orchestral Works - Vol. 3	Chandos	10 January 2025	1
Nash Ensemble	Debussy/String Quartet and Sonatas	Hyperion	17 January 2025	1
Wiener Philharmoniker/Riccardo Muti	Neujahrskonzert 2025/New Year's Concert	Sony Classical	24 January 2025	1
Bavarian Radio Symphony Orchestra/Simon Rattle	Mahler/Symphony No 7	BR Klassik	31 January 2025	1
Stephen Moccio	Legends Myths and Lavender	Decca	7 February 2025	1
Alice Sara	Field/Complete Nocturnes	Deutsche Grammophon	14 February 2025	1
Stephen Moccio	Legends Myths and Lavender	Decca	21 February 2025	1
Abel Selacoe	Hymns of Bantu	Warner Classics	28 February 2025	1
Stephen Hough/The Hallé	Hough/Piano Concerto Sonatina & Partita	Hyperion	7 March 2025	1
Stephen Moccio	Legends Myths and Lavender	Decca	14 March 2025	1
John Wilson and Sinfonia of London	Walton/Violin Concerto	Chandos	21 March 2025	1
Rana/Amsterdam Sinfonietta	Bach/Keyboard Concertos BWV 1052 1053	Warner Classics	28 March 2025	1
Boston Symphony Orchestra/Andris Nelsons	Shostakovich/Symphonies Concertos	Deutsche Grammophon	4 April 2025	1
Katarzyna Budnik/Maria Nowak/Yuya Okamoto/Krystian Zimerman	Brahms/Piano Quartets Nos 2 & 3	Deutsche Grammophon	11 April 2025	1
Lovell Jones/BBC Philharmonic/Gamba	Gipps/Orchestral Works - Vol 4	Chandos	18 April 2025	1
Norwegian National Or/Gardner	Wagner/Der Fliegende	Decca	25 April 2025	1
Stephen Moccio	Legends Myths and Lavender	Decca	2 May 2025	1
Yuja Wang/Boston Symphony Orchestra/Andris Nelsons	Shostakovich/The Piano Ctos/Solo Works	Deutsche Grammophon	9 May 2025	1
Sheku Kanneh-Mason/John Wilson/Sinfonia of London	Shostakovich/Britten/Cello Concerto No 2	Decca	16 May 2025	1
John Wilson/Sinfonia of London	Rachmaninoff/Symphony No 1	Chandos	23 May 2025	1
Benjamin Appl and James Baillieu	For Dieter - Hommage a Dietrich	Alpha	30 May 2025	1
Max Richter	In a Landscape	Decca	6 June 2025	1
Brad Kella	Phoebe's Melody	Modern Sky	13 June 2025	2
Kammerorchester Basel/Giovanni Antonini	Joseph Haydn/2032 - Vol 17 - Per Il Luigi	Alpha	27 June 2025	1
Scottish Opera	Gilbert & Sullivan/Utopia	Opus Arte	4 July 2025	1
London Oratory Schola Cantorum	Sacred Treassures of Rome	Hyperion	11 July 2025	1
Reich/Nypo/Synergy/Zweden	Reich/Jacob's Ladder/Traveler's Prayer	NoneSuch	18 July 2025	1
Max Richter	In a Landscape	Decca	25 July 2025	1
Langlois de Swarte/le Consort	Vivaldi/le Quattro Stagioni	Hyperion	1 August 2025	1
Philharmonia Orchestra/Andrew Davis/Martyn Brabbins	Bach/King of Kings	Chandos	8 August 2025	2
Max Richter	In a Landscape	Decca	22 August 2025	1
Yunchan Lim	Tchaikovsky/The Seasons	Decca	29 August 2025	1
Mahan Esfahani	Bach/The Well-Tempered Clavier 1	Hyperion	5 September 2025	1
Jonas Kaufmann/Helmut Deutsch	Doppelganger	Sony Classical	12 September 2025	1
Kanneh-Masons	River of Music	Decca	19 September 2025	2
Lerner and Loewe	My Fair Lady	Chandos	3 October 2025	1
Daniil Trifonov	Tchaikovsky	Decca	10 October 2025	1
Sabine Devieihe/Pygmalion/Raphael Pichon	Brahms/Ein Deutsches Requiem	Harmonia Mundi	17 October 2025	1
Michael Seal/BBC Philharmonic	Bliss/Miracle in the Gorbals/Metamorphica	Chandos	24 October 2025	1
Dirk Brosse/Brussels Philharmonic	Wiseman/Music for Film & Television	Silva Screen	31 October 2025	1
Hildur Gudnadottir	Where to From	Deutsche Grammophon	7 November 2025	1
André Rieu and Johann Strauss Orchestra	Thank You Johann Strauss	Decca	14 November 2025	2
Víkingur Ólafsson	Opus 109	Deutsche Grammophon	28 November 2025	1
André Rieu and Johann Strauss Orchestra	Thank You Johann Strauss	Decca	5 December 2025	8
2026
Nicola Benedetti	Violin Café	Decca	30 January 2026	1
André Rieu and Johann Strauss Orchestra	Thank You Johann Strauss	Decca	6 February 2026	1

=== By artist ===
As of 6 February 2026, fourteen artists have spent six or more weeks at the top of the Specialist Classical Albums Chart so far during the 2020s. The totals below include only credited performances.

Artist	Number-one albums	Weeks at number one
Ludovico Einaudi	2	43
Víkingur Ólafsson	5	25
Max Richter	4	25
Poor Clares of Arundel	2	22
Sheku Kanneh-Mason	3	21
Simon Rattle	3	16
André Rieu	1	11
Johann Strauss Orchestra	1	11
John Wilson	9	10
Choir of King's College, Cambridge	3	9
Lang Lang	2	8
Isata Kanneh-Mason	3	8
Stephen Moccio	1	7
Chad Lawson	1	6

=== By record label ===
As of 6 February 2026, Twenty nine record labels have released chart-topping albums so far during the 2020s.

Record label	Number-one albums	Weeks at number one
Decca	38	172
Deutsche Grammophon	23	51
Hyperion	20	20
Chandos	16	18
Warner Classics	5	10
Sony Classical	7	7
Delphian	2	4
Harmonia Mundi	5	5
Opera Rara	1	2
VCM	1	1
BMG	2	2
Pentatone	2	2
Naxos	1	1
King's College Cambridge	2	4
Erato	2	2
Linn	1	1
ECM	1	2
Classic FM	1	1
NoneSuch	2	2
Asthmatic Kitty	1	1
Silva Screen	2	2
Orange Mountain Music	1	1
LSO Live	1	1
Signum	1	1
ECM New Series	1	1
BR Klassik	1	1
Alpha	2	2
Modern Sky Records	1	2
Opus Arte	1	1

== See also ==
- List of UK Albums Chart number ones of the 2020s
