= L'Invisible =

Opera by Aribert Reimann

- Opera by Aribert Reimann
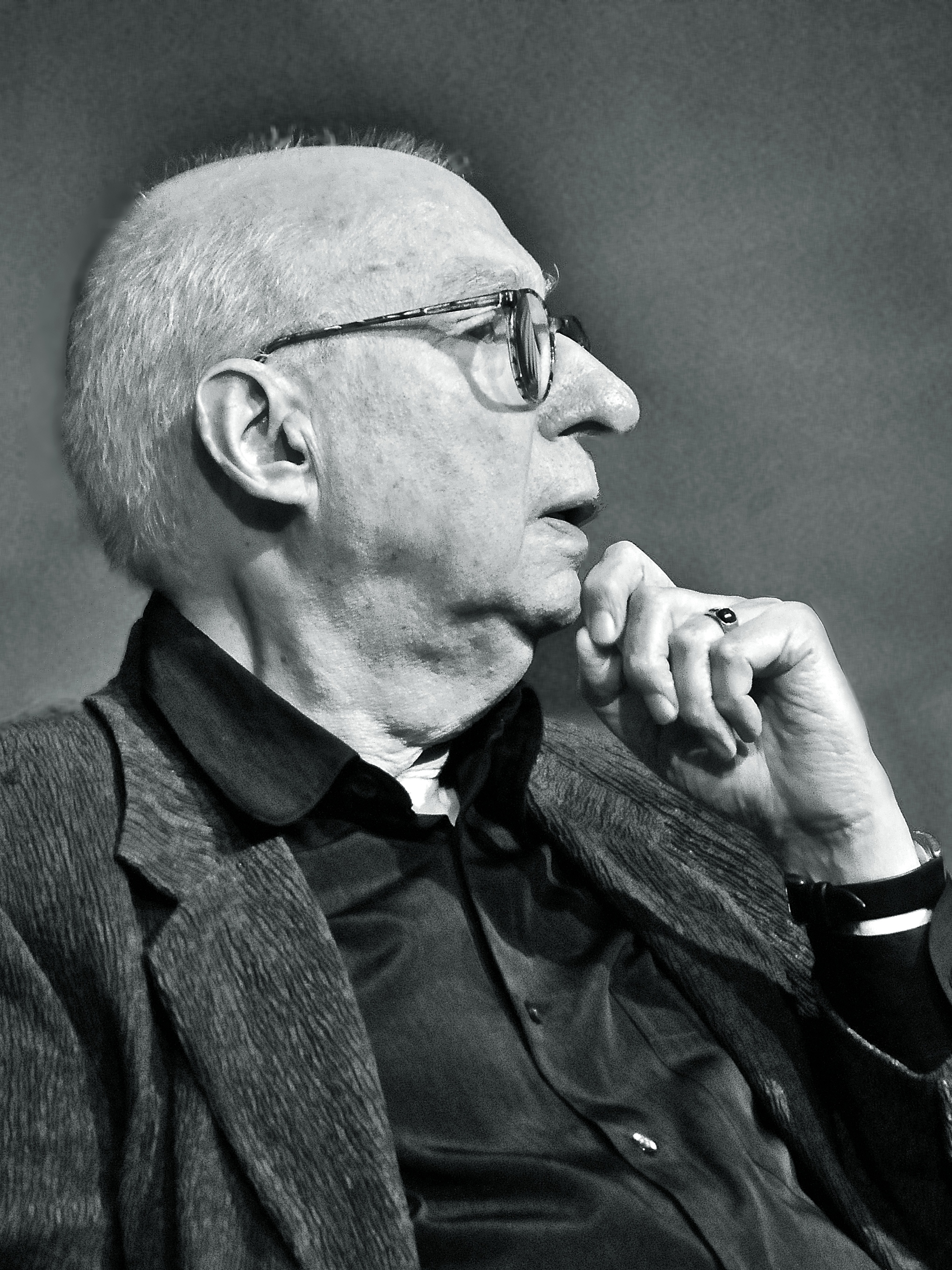
- Reimann in 2010
- Language: French
- Based on: Maeterlinck's L'Intruse, Intérieur and La Mort de Tintagiles
- Premiere: 8 October 2017; Deutsche Oper Berlin

L'Invisible is a 2017 opera by Aribert Reimann. The French libretto by the composer is a condensation of three short independent plays by Maurice Maeterlinck: L'Intruse (The Intruder), Intérieur and La Mort de Tintagiles (The Death of Tintagiles), into a single act opera. The "invisible" in each part is death, first as a supernatural force, then as tragic news, then in the person of a murderous queen. The premiere was given at the Deutsche Oper Berlin on 8 October 2017 in a production that was recorded.

== History ==
Aribert Reimann began work on L'Invisible in 2011. He combined as the librettist three short independent plays by Maurice Maeterlinck; L'Intruse (The Intruder), Intérieur and La Mort de Tintagiles (The Death of Tintagiles), into a single act opera. The "invisible" in each part is death. The first play, a domestic tragedy, has supernatural overtones. The second play is a family tragedy around a suicide. The third play is based on a medieval story around murder to pursue power. The plays are connected by Maeterlinck's focus on fate and inevitable death; all of them feature invisible and unheard characters. Reimann connected the three plays further by assigning similar characters in different parts to the same singers. He used a recurring death chord in all parts, however in different orchestration. The parts are further linked by interludes, in which three 'messengers of death' appear, with countertenor voices. The orchestral sound has been described as "rich and constantly inventive late-romantic and expressionistic", and the vocal lines as of "emotional intensity and expressive focus".

The opera was premiered at the Deutsche Oper Berlin on 8 October 2017 in a production that was recorded, staged by Vasily Barkhatov and conducted by Donald Runnicles.

== Recording ==
- Rachel Harnisch (Ursula/Marie/Ygraine), Annika Schlicht (Marthe/Bellangère), Ronnita Miller (Handmaiden), Stephen Bronk (Grandfather/An old man/Aglovale), Thomas Blondelle (Uncle/Stranger), Tim Severloh, Matthew Shaw, Martin Wölfel (Servants) Orchestra of Deutsche Oper Berlin, Donald Runnicles. Oehms. 2018
