= Asmik Grigorian =

Armenian-Lithuanian operatic soprano (born 1981)

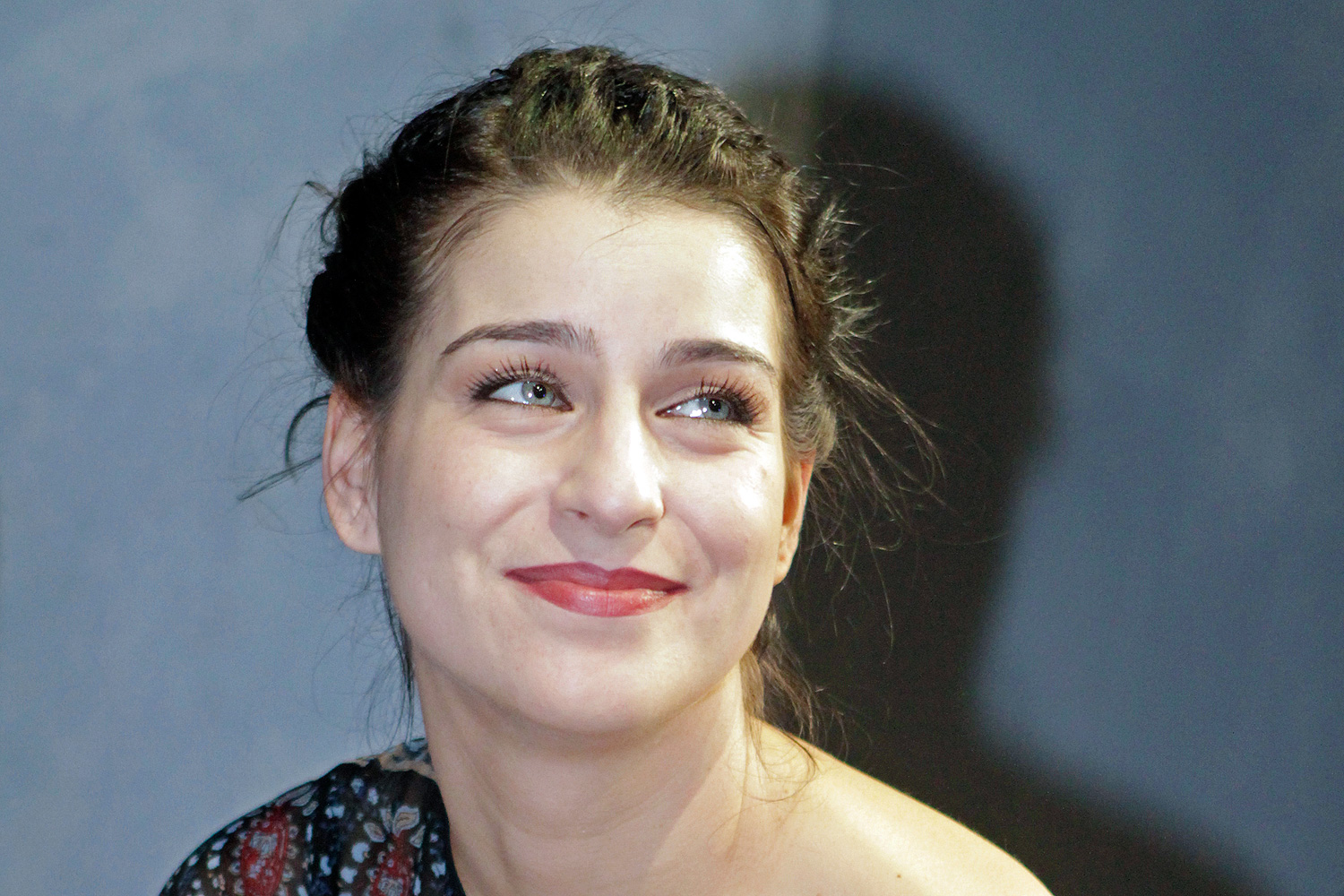
- Born: 12 May 1981 (age 45); Vilnius, Lithuanian SSR, Soviet Union
- Occupation: Opera singer (soprano)
- Spouse: Vasily Barkhatov
- Children: 2
- Parents: Gegham Grigoryan (father); Irena Milkevičiūtė (mother)
- Website: Official website

Asmik Grigorian (born 12 May 1981 in Vilnius) is a Lithuanian operatic soprano.

== Life and career ==
In 1999, Asmik Grigorian graduated from National M. K. Čiurlionis School of Art in Vilnius. She studied music at the Lithuanian Academy of Music and Theatre and graduated from it with a master's degree in 2006. Grigorian made her operatic debut in Christiansand (Norway) in 2004 as Donna Anna directed by Jonathan Miller, in 2005 she made her Lithuanian debut as Violetta also directed by Jonathan Miller, and in 2006 she became one of the founding members of Vilnius City Opera, singing in Puccini's La bohème (Mimi and Musetta), Leoncavallo's Pagliacci (Nedda), Verdi's Il trovatore, Puccini's Manon Lescaut, Tchaikovsky's Pique Dame and Eugene Onegin, Sweeney Todd, and Massenet's Werther. Grigorian later performed at the Latvian National Opera (in 2005 under the direction of Andres Jaegers) and the Mariinsky Theater, performing in Puccini's Il Trittico, Verdi's Otello, Puccini's Madama Butterfly, Prokofiev's The Gambler, and Dvorak's Rusalka. She is the recipient of the highest Lithuanian theatre award, the Golden Stage Cross [lt], in 2005 and 2010.

Since 2011, Grigorian has performed in various opera houses on the international stage. She was noted in operas such as Tchaikovsky's Nastasya in The Enchantress at the Theater an der Wien in September 2014 and as Tatiana in Eugene Onegin at the Komische Oper Berlin in 2016.

In May 2016, Grigorian was honoured at the International Opera Awards in London as the Best Newcomer ("Young Female Singer"). In December 2016 she performed at the Royal Swedish Opera in the title role of Giordano's Fedora. In her debut at the Salzburg Festival in August 2017, she sang the role of Marie in Alban Berg's Wozzeck to critical acclaim. Rupert Christiansen of The Telegraph praised Grigorian as a "superb musician, with deep understanding of Bergian vocal style".

Grigorian made her Edinburgh International Festival debut in August 2019 when Komische Oper Berlin brought their production of Eugene Onegin to Edinburgh.

During the 2019/20 season, Asmik performed as Manon Lescaut at Oper Frankfurt, she also returned to her hometown of Vilnius where she performed as Polina in The Gambler. This role was reprised towards the end of her season at the Mariinsky Theatre in Saint Petersburg. Performances of Bellini's Norma Elektra by Richard Strauss and Janacek's Jenůfa were canceled due to the COVID-19 pandemic.

Asmik began her 2020/21 season as Madama Butterfly at the Vienna State Opera and then at the Mariinsky Theatre, then later in the season at the Deutsche Oper Berlin. She appeared as Lisa in Pique Dame at the Mariinsky Theatre, Dvorak's Rusalka at the Teatro Real in Madrid conducted by Ivor Bolton and the title role in Salome by Strauss at the Bolshoi Theatre conducted by Tugan Sokhiev. She performed as Senta in Wagner's Der fliegende Holländer at the Bayreuth Festival and in Elektra at the Salzburg Festival, conducted by Franz Welser-Möst.

Grigorian's 2021/22 season began with a house and role debut at the Royal Opera House in a new production of Jenůfa conducted by Henrik Nánási. In concert, she performed as part of the Deutsche AIDS-Stiftung Gala at the Berlin State Opera, and as Marie in Drei Bruchstücke aus Wozzeck at the Teatro del Maggio and the Elbphilharmonie. At the Vienna State Opera, Asmik performs as Manon Lescaut. She went on a European tour with pianist Lukas Geniusas in support of their recently released album, Dissonance. Asmik returned to the Salzburg Festival to perform the three leading roles in a new production of Puccini's Il Trittico, directed by Christof Loy.

Asmik commenced the 2022/23 season with a continuation of her album recital tour with pianist Lukas Geniusas. She returned to two of her signature title-roles this season, firstly, in Rusalka at the Dvořák Prague festival and then at the Royal Opera House and secondly, in Jenůfa at the Wiener Staatsoper. Grigorian later appeared in the title-role of The Enchantress and as Manon Lescaut at Oper Frankfurt. She also made her Japanese debut as the title-role in Salome with the Tokyo Symphony Orchestra. To end her season, Grigorian returned to the Salzburger Festspiele where she made her role debut as Lady Macbeth in Verdi's Macbeth.

Her 2023/24 season began with Madama Butterfly, in which she made her house debut at Arena di Verona.. In December 2023, she made her debut in Turandot at the Wiener Staatsoper opposite Jonas Kaufmann in a new staging by Claus Guth. On May 11, 2024, she sang Cio-Cio San in Madama Butterfly on her first Metropolitan Opera Live in HD transmission. Her second Met Live in HD was as Tatiana in Eugene Onegin in May 2026.

Grigorian discussing her role as Manon Lescaut in Puccini's Manon Lescaut in 2026

Grigorian's 2025/26 season opened with a return to the role of Desademona in Otello at Teatro Real Madrid, followed by revivals of her performances as Salome in Dmitri Tcherniakov's production at the Hamburg State Opera and as Senta in Der fliegende Holländer at Opéra de Monte-Carlo. In January 2026, she appeared as Cio-Cio San in Madama Butterfly at Deutsche Oper Berlin, before returning to the Bayerische Staatsoper for performances of Salome and Macbeth. Later in the season, she sang the title role in Manon Lescaut at the Gran Teatre del Liceu, and Tatiana in Eugene Onegin at both the Metropolitan Opera and the Vienna State Opera. Grigorian reunited with pianist Lukas Geniusas for recital appearances at the Berlin State Opera, Megaron Hall in Athens, Opernhaus Zürich, the Accademia Nazionale di Santa Cecilia in Rome, the Musikverein für Steiermark in Graz, and the Teatro del Maggio Musicale Fiorentino. Her concert engagements included Strauss's Vier letzte Lieder with the Swedish Radio Symphony Orchestra and Verdi's Requiem with the Cleveland Orchestra under Franz Welser-Möst. She also reviver her theatriccal concert Una Diva Is Born with pianist and composer Hyung-ki Joo at the Salzburg Festival and the Vienna State Opera.

Grigorian is the official ambassador for the Rimantas Kaukenas Charity.

== Family ==
Asmik Grigorian is the daughter of the Armenian tenor Gegham Grigoryan (1951–2016) and the Lithuanian soprano Irena Milkevičiūtė (b. 1947), LMTA professor. Her parents performed the leads in Madama Butterfly together while Milkevičiūtė was pregnant with Asmik.

Grigorian is married to operatic director Vasily Barkhatov. She has two children, one son and one daughter.

Grigorian also has three brothers, Irvidas Česaitis, Vartan Grigorian, who is a conductor, and Tigran Grigorian.

== Opera roles ==
Role	Opera/Musical	Venue	Date
Marie	Wozzeck	Salzburg Festival	2017
Mrs. Lovett	Sweeney Todd	Vilnius City Opera	2017
Salome	Salome	Bolshoi Theatre; Salzburg Festival	February 2022; 2018
Tatiana	Eugene Onegin	Vienna State Opera; Komische Oper Berlin	October 2021; 2016, 2019
Jenůfa	Jenůfa	Berlin State Opera; Royal Opera House	May 2022; September 2021
Manon Lescaut	Manon Lescaut	Vienna State Opera	February 2022
Liza	Pique Dame	La Scala	February 2022
Cio-Cio San	Madama Butterfly	Royal Swedish Opera; Deutsche Oper Berlin; Metropolitan Opera	November 2021; May 2021; April 2024
Fedora	Fedora	Oper Frankfurt	May 2022
Rusalka	Rusalka	Royal Opera House; Teatro Real	April 2022; 2020
Nastasya	The Enchantress	Theater an der Wien	September 2014
Chrysothemis	Elektra	Salzburg Festival	July 2021
Senta	Der Fliegende Holländer	Bayreuth Festival	July 2021
Polina	The Gambler	Lithuanian National Opera	March 2021
Turandot	Turandot	Vienna State Opera	December 2023
Lady Macbeth	Macbeth	Salzburg Festival	July 2023
Norma	Norma	Theater an der Wien, Vienna	February 2025
Giorgetta	Il tabarro	Teatro dell'Opera di Roma Salzburg Festival Opéra national de Paris	2015-2016 July, August 2022 April, May 2025
Suor Angelica	Suor Angelica	Teatro dell'Opera di Roma Salzburg Festival Opéra national de Paris	2015-2016 July, August 2022 April, May 2025
Lauretta	Gianni Schicchi	Teatro dell'Opera di Roma Salzburg Festival Opéra national de Paris	2015-2016 July, August 2022 April, May 2025
Desdemona	Otello	Wiener Staatsoper Teatro Real, Madrid	November 2024 September 2025
Carmen	Carmen	Salzburg Festival	August 2026
Bianca	Eine florentinische Tragödie	Wiener Staatsoper, Vienna	October 2026
Judith	Bluebeard's Castle	Wiener Staatsoper, Vienna	October 2026

=== Early roles ===
Role	Opera/Musical
Argie	Les Paladins
Violetta	La Traviata
Mimì Musetta	La bohème
Charlotte	Werther
Johanna Barker	Sweeney Todd
Susanna; Contessa	Le Nozze di Figaro
Alcina	Alcina
Armida	Rinaldo
Leonora	Il Trovatore
Micaëla	Carmen
Nedda	Pagliacci
Mariya	Mazepa
Donna Anna; Donna Elvira	Don Giovanni
Pamina; Papagena	Die Zauberflöte
Anoush	Anoush
"Elle"	La voix humaine
Mary Magdalene	Jesus Christ Superstar
Esmeralda	Notre-Dame de Paris

== Concert repertoire ==
- Weinberg: Requiem (world premiere recording)
- Andrew Lloyd Webber: Requiem
- Mozart: Requiem
- Pergolesi: Stabat mater
- Verdi: Messa da Requiem
- Mahler: Symphony No. 8
- Britten: War Requiem
- Dvořák: Requiem
- Dvořák: Stabat Mater
- Shostakovich: Symphony No. 14

== Awards ==
- Ópera XXI: Female Opera Singer of the Year (2022)
- Best female singer in International Opera Awards (2019)
- Order for Merits to Lithuania, Knight's Cross (2018)
- Best emerging artist in International Opera Awards (2016)
- Austrian Theater Awards – Best Leading Role (2019)
- Opernwelt Critics Choice – Singer of the Year (2019)
- Franco Abbiati award (2020)
- Olivier Award (Jenůfa) for best production (2022)
- Order for Merits to Lithuania, Knight's Cross (2018)
- Stage Cross in 2005 for Best Debut as Violetta
- Stage Cross in 2009 for Best Singer for Mrs. Lovett
- Lithuanian National Prize for Culture and Arts (2019)
- Armenian Movses Khorenatsi Medal, (2021)
- Sängerin des Jahre: OPUS KLASSIK Award Winner, (2023)
- Österreichischer Musiktheaterpreis: "Special Jury Prize", (2024)
- Best female singer in International Opera Awards (2025)
- Österreichischer Musiktheaterpreis: "Best Female Leading Role", (2026)

== Recordings ==
=== Audio ===
- With Dmitri Hvorostovsky: Dmitri Hvorostovsky Sings of War, Peace, Love and Sorrow, as duet partner in War and Peace by Sergey Prokofiev and The Demon by Anton Rubinstein. Delos International, 2016
- Dissonance, Asmik Grigorian & Lukas Geniusas, Alpha Classics, 25 March 2022.
- Verdi's Requiem, The Cleveland Orchestra, conducted by Franz Welser-Möst, features soprano Asmik Grigorian, mezzo-soprano Deniz Uzun, tenor Joshua Guerrero, bass Tareq Nazmi, and The Cleveland Orchestra. Recorded live during Grigorian's tour with The Cleveland Orchestra in January 2026. The Cleveland Orchestra and Musical Arts Association, August 21, 2026.

=== Video ===
- 2019: Strauss – Salome (Julian Pregardien, Asmik Grigorian, John Daszak, Romeo Castellucci, Anna Maria Chiuri, Gabor Bretz)
- 2021: Strauss – Elektra (Ausrine Stundyte, Tanja Ariane Baumgartner, Asmik Grigorian, Michael Laurenz, Franz Welser-Möst)
- 2021: Dvořák – Rusalka (Asmik Grigorian, Eric Cutler, Karita Mattila, Katarina Dalayman, Ivor Bolton)
- 2022: Wagner – Der fliegende Holländer (Georg Zeppenfeld, Asmik Grigorian, Eric Cutler, John Lundgren, Oksana Lyniv, Dmitri Tcherniakov)
- 2023: Puccini – Il Trittico (Alexey Neklyudov, Roman Burdenko, Joshua Guerrero, Karita Mattila, Giulia Semenzato, Franz Welser-Möst, Christof Loy)
- 2024: Dvořák – Rusalka (David Butt Philip, Matthew Rose, Emma Bell, Sarah Connolly, Ross Ramgobin, Hongni Wu, Semyon Bychkov, Ann Yee, Natalie Abrahami)
- 2024: Verdi – Macbeth (Vladislav Sulimsky, Tareq Nazmi, Caterina Piva, Jonathan Tetelman, Evan Leroy Johnson, Aleksei Kulagin, Grisha Martirosyan, Hovhannes Karapetyan, Philippe Jordan)
- 2025: Bellini – Norma (as Norma, Freddie De Tommaso as Pollione, Aigul Akhmetshina as Adalgisa), Theater an der Wien, Vienna Symphony, conducted by Francesco Lanzillotta
- 2026: Bizet - Carmen (as Carmen), Salzburg Festival

== See also ==
Lithuanian opera
