= Dalia Ibelhauptaitė =

Lithuanian theatre director

- Born: 4 May 1967 (age 59); Vilnius, Lithuania
- Occupations: Opera and theatre director and producer, television producer, former playwright
- Years active: 1982–present
- Spouse: Dexter Fletcher (m. 1997)

Dalia Ibelhauptaitė (born 4 May 1967) is a Lithuanian opera and theatre director and producer, a television producer and former playwright.

== Biography ==
Dalia Ibelhauptaitė was born in Vilnius in 1967, and became a director at the age of 15 when she formed the Young Theatre Company in Lithuania. At the Young Theatre Company, Dalia worked as a director and playwright until 1985 when she became assistant director at the Vilnius State Theatre. She trained at the Russian Drama Academy (GITIS) in Moscow with renowned Russian theatre director Mark Zakharov.

In 1990, she directed To Damascus at the Moscow Lencom Theatre. In 1991, Ibelhauptaitė was invited to the Royal National Theatre Studio in London, and directed A Lawsuit as well as doing a series of workshops on Russian classical plays. She has been in London ever since. Ibelhauptaitė has also given masterclasses at National Opera Studio and Royal National Theatre Studio in London, and is a popular teacher in China, Israel, the Netherlands, France, Los Angeles and India.

In 2005 Ibelhauptaitė directed Svejk at The Duke's on 42nd Street, which was her first show in New York. It was nominated for a Drama League award as distinguished production of the year.

In 2006 Dalia with maestro Gintaras Rinkevicius and Lithuanian State Symphony Orchestra have founded independent opera company "Bohemians" (name taken from Puccini's "La Bohème"). In 2012 this company became the basis of Vilnius City Opera. Ibelhauptaite works as artistic director and producer of Vilnius City Opera.

In 2011 Ibelhauptaitė has been honoured by President of the Republic of Lithuania who awarded her with the Knight's Cross of the medal "Merits to Lithuania" to celebrate her contribution to culture in Lithuania. In 2021 Dalia was awarded Government Culture and Arts Award.

Ibelhauptaitė married Dexter Fletcher in Westminster, London, in 1997, after the pair met on the set of one of her stage productions in London.

In June 2019 Dexter Fletcher and Dalia Ibelhauptaitė created their film company "DXD Films Ltd.".

=== Feud with Aistė Pilvelytė ===
In 2016, Ibelhauptaitė was chosen to be a jury member at the Lithuanian national selection for Eurovision 2016 during Show 7, where singer Aistė Pilvelytė was going to perform her song "You Bet". She performed the song in a pink wig, which she took off in the middle of her performance, along with fake tears on her face. After her performance, Ibelhauptaitė asks Pilvelytė why she took off her wig in the middle of her performance, Pilvelytė responds that after the man she wrote the song about left her, taking off the wig meant her finding herself. Ibelhauptaitė continued, saying that her outfit and stage performance felt like "cheap theatre", and like a "town's melodrama", and comments that her fake tears reminded her of Halloween, and that she couldn't go on stage with those fake tears because it would make her look funny, and that with the type of song she is singing, she would need real tears and if she did not take her real feelings, then fake tears would not help and comments that she would not need fake tears or wigs for it. After she said it, the host, Gerūta Griniūtė, asks Pilvelytė if she had any comments, Pilvelytė responds that when she went on stage, she knew that Ibelhauptaitė would tear her down because she did not like her, to which Ibelhauptaitė responded saying that she did not know who she is, and that she can't dislike her, Pilvelytė responds that she knew that she would talk badly about her, to which Ibelhauptaitė responds that that is how she knew that she was fake. During the interview after her performance and the juries comments, Pilvelytė comments that she does not like her and will never like her, and that she felt that all the time she did not like her either, that Ibelhauptaitė not knowing her was her business, she further comments that from a distance she could feel her aura and energy and that she just did not like her and knew that she would have talked badly about her from the start. Pilvelytė later said in an interview "I am very calm. I have short memory for bad things. Criticism is something worth to do better for, but you need to learn how to critisise. It's art. I can say, that I don't need this or that, I would do something differently instead of that.", "I am not a granny from Gariūnas, I wouldn't say that. It should be intelligence, it should be respect for yourself, and for the person who goes on stage. That "gariūniškumo" threw me off a bit. Maybe that's why the conflict started."

In 2017, Ibelhauptaitė returned as a juror for the national selection again, for Show 8, the Semi-final, and the Final. In the semi-final, Aistė Pilvelytė performed the song "I'm Like a Wolf", which Ibelhauptaitė chose not to listen to before the show, wanting to wait to see it live as a first impression. She comments that she liked her outfit, and she liked the tattoos and the "funky, cool" song, and comments that the song is strong, and that it was a good song. She also tells Pilvelytė that she looked at her performance through the camera, and comments that she was too expressive, and the song did not need that because it comes off "overdramatic" and says that it needs to be from the feelings, and comments that she would feel freer by doing so. After the performance and juries comments, Pilvelytė comments that she already has an overexpressive face, and says that she is an emotional person, and that there was still time to work things out until the final.

== Credits ==
=== Theatre productions ===
Walpurgis Night by Erofeyev and Svejk (Gate Theatre), London
Gamblers by Gogol (Tricycle Theatre), London
Mirandolina by Goldoni (Lyric Theatre, London
The Impresario From Smyrna by Goldoni (Old Red Lion Theatre), London
Promise (Old Red Lion Theatre), London
The Crucible by Miller (LAMDA)
The Lower Depths by Gorky (LAMDA)
Much Ado About Nothing by Shakespeare (CSSD)
Romeo and Juliet by Shakespeare for the Shi-Wa Charity Gala at the Globe Theatre, London.
Svejk (The Duke's, New York)

=== Opera productions ===
Don Giovanni, Mozart (Musica nel Chiostro, Batignano, Italy)
Rigoletto Verdi ('The Opera Company': Hackney Empire, London and UK tour)
Madama Butterfly Puccini (Opera North, UK)
Eugene Onegin Tchaikovsky (Opera North, UK)
Don Pasquale Donizetti (Opera Zuid, Netherlands)
"Gambler" Prokofiev (Opera Zuid, Netherlands)
Un Ballo In Maschera Verdi (Lithuanian National Opera)
I Pagliacci Leoncavallo (Congress Palace, Lithuania)
Showcase (The Queen Elizabeth Hall, London)
La Forza del Destino G.Verdi (Lithuanian National Opera and Israel National Opera)
La Bohème Puccini (Congress Palace, Lithuania )
Die Zauberflöte Mozart (Congress Palace, Lithuania )
"Werther" Massenet (Congress Palace, Lithuania )
"Sweeney Todd: the Demon Barber of Fleet Street" Sondheim (Congress Palace, Lithuania )
"XYZ - electronic opera fantasy" (Industrial spaces, Lithuania )
"Onegin" Tchaikovsky (Congress Palace, Lithuania )
"Katia Kabanova" Janáček (Congress Palace, Lithuania )
"Manon Lescaut" Puccini (Congress Palace, Lithuania )
"Cosi fan Tutti" Mozart (Congress Palace, Lithuania )
"Il Trovatore" Verdi (Congress Palace, Lithuania )
"Pelleas et Melisande" Debussy (Congress Palace, Lithuania )
"Tosca" Puccini (Congress Palace, Lithuania )
"E-Carmen" Bizet/electronic version by M.Adomaitis (Compensa concert hall, Lithuania )
"Faust" Gounod (Congress Palace, Lithuania )
"Samson et Dalila" Saint-Saens (Congress Palace, Lithuania )
"Queen of Spades" Tchaikovsky (Congress Palace, Lithuania )

=== Staged concerts ===
"Bohemian Dreams" (Congress Palace, Lithuania )
"The Return of the Nightingales" (Congress Palace, Lithuania )
"Arias from the Shower" (Congress Palace, Lithuania )

=== Work as producer ===
"VCO ROCK" (dir.G.Seduikis) (Sports Palace, Lithuania )
"Hansel and Gretel" Humperdinck (dir.G.Seduikis) (Congress Palace, Lithuania )
"Stories from New York" (dir.G.Seduikis) (Congress Palace, Lithuania )

=== Short films ===
Let The Good Times Roll by Dexter Fletcher, starring Bob Hoskins, Ron Cook and Dexter Fletcher
Feeling Good by Dexter Fletcher, starring Jason Flemyng.

=== Television producer ===
The Offer, Paramount+, 10 episodes
