= Daphne Awards =

Danish music and science award

The Daphne Awards are awarded by the Danish Research Foundation. The Daphne Music Award is endowed with €650.000 and given for innovative connections between music and science. The Next Generation Award is worth €100.000 each. A Science Award is planned for 2027. The first official Award Ceremony will be on 14 May 2026 at the Tivoli Concert Hall with the Copenhagen Philharmonic conducted by Alondra de la Parra.

== Recipients ==
=== Daphne Music Award ===
- 2026 Lang Lang

=== Next Generation Award ===
- 2026 Serena Sáenz, Jonathan Tetelman

=== Daphne Science Award ===
- (planned for 2027)
