= Lorenzo Passerini =

Italian conductor

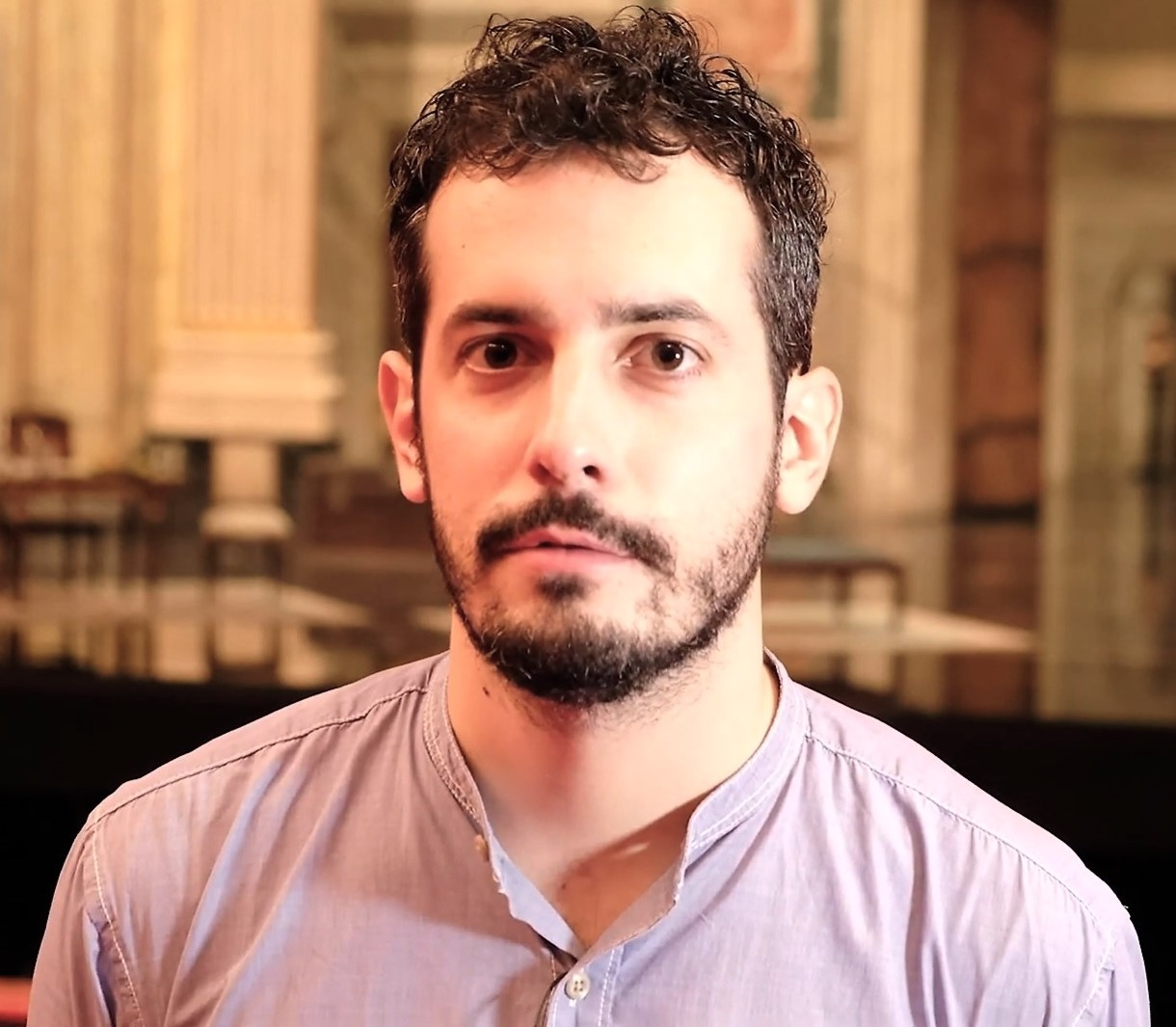
- Passerini at Teatro Regio Torino in 2019
- Born: 1991 (age 33–34); Sondrio, Lombardy, Italy
- Occupations: Conductor; Trombonist
- Website: www.lorenzopasserini.com

Lorenzo Passerini (born 1991) is an Italian conductor who began as a trombonist. He has worked at major opera houses in Europe and Australia, such as Verdi's Un ballo in maschera at the Teatro Real in Madrid, Gounod's Faust at the Sydney Opera House, and a new production of Giordano's Fedora at the Oper Frankfurt in 2022. Currently Passerini works as a chief conductor of Jyväskylä Symphony Orchestra, in Finland.

== Career ==
Passerini was born in Morbegno, Sondrio. He studied trombone at the Como Conservatory, graduating in 2009. He studied further at the Aosta Conservatory, achieving a master's degree in 2014. He played in orchestras, touring internationally, with conductors including John Axelrod, Andrey Boreyko, Fabio Luisi and Riccardo Muti.

At the same time, he turned to conducting, first studying with Ennio Nicotra in 2010. He also received tuition from Oleg Caetani, Massimiliano Caldi, Pietro Mianiti and Gilberto Serembe. He founded the Antonio Vivaldi Orchestra in 2011, and made his debut concert with them. Composers such as Piergiorgio Ratti, Antonio Eros Negri and Andrea Battistoni composed music for the orchestra.

He has conducted the Orchestra Sinfonica di Milano Giuseppe Verdi, the Orchestra della Fondazione Arena di Verona, the Mexico State Orchestra, and the Symphony Orchestra “New Russia” in Moscow in concerts. In opera, he conducted Puccini's Tosca at the Teatro Regio in Turin, Orff's Carmina Burana at the Wielki Theatre in Warsaw, Verdi's Un ballo in maschera at the Teatro Real in Madrid, and Rossini's La Cenerentola at the opera of Las Palmas. He conducted repeatedly at the Sydney Opera House, Gounod's Faust, Verdi's Aida and Puccini's La Bohème.

He conducted Giordano's Fedora at the Oper Frankfurt when the work was first performed at the house in 2022, directed by Christof Loy, with Nadja Stefanoff and Jonathan Tetelman in the leading roles. Reviewer Jan Brachmann from the FAZ noted that he led the orchestra "bright awake" (hellwach) and with sensitivity, letting the singers dominate even when singing softly. A reviewer from Neue Musikzeitung noted that he offered temperament for the Russian music of the first act, sensitivity for the Paris "perfume" of the second act, and dramatic approach for the ending in failure and death. Another reviewer summarised: "Long forgotten and neglected, Passerini brings this opera to new life in a fresh, sparkling and supremely elegant dramatic conducting" ("Die lang vergessene und vernachlässigte Oper lässt Passerini in einem frischen, spritzigen und überaus elegant dramatischen Dirigat zu neuem Leben erwecken").

From 2017, Passerini worked as an artistic director of the concerts at the Teatro Sociale Sondrio. In fall 2024, Passerini started as Chief Conductor of the Jyväskylä Sinfonia Orchestra in Finland. "My musical vision is based on the idea that sharing is the cornerstone of collaboration," Passerini says, about his season in Jyväskylä.
