= Vilnius City Opera =

Coordinates: 54°41′08″N 25°16′40″E

Vilnius City Opera is an opera company that started in 2006 when a team of independent artists joined forces in staging Giacomo Puccini's La bohème. The artists included director Dalia Ibelhauptaitė, conductor Gintaras Rinkevičius and scene artist Juozas Statkevičius.

The artists have called themselves bohemiečiai (the Bohemians) since this time. After 8 years of activity, the troupe acquired the status of a professional theatre and became known as the Vilnius City Opera.

Vilnius City Opera has no theatre of their own and stage their operas in the Vilnius Congress Concert Hall. One of the main aims of VCO is to make the opera genre more widely available and to free it from elitist stereotypes and snobbishness.

Vilnius City Opera logo

Operas staged by Vilnius City Opera (selected list):

- Giacomo Puccini La bohème, 2006
- Wolfgang Amadeus Mozart Die Zauberflöte 2007
- Ruggero Leoncavallo Pagliacci, 2008
- Jules Massenet Werther, 2008
- Electronic opera XYZ, 2010
- Giacomo Puccini Manon Lescaut, 2012
- Marijus Adomaitis, Electronic opera e-Carmen, 2016
- Charles Gounod Faust, 2017

== Opera soloists ==
- Asmik Grigorian
- Laimonas Pautienius
- Jurgita Adamonytė
- Jovita Vaškevičiūtė
- Rafailas Karpis
- Tadas Girininkas
- Arūnas Malikėnas
- Edgaras Montvydas
- Justina Gringytė

== See also ==
Lithuanian opera
