= Bacevičius =

- Lithuanian surname
- m.: Bacevičius
- f.: (married): Bacevičienė
- Related names: Bacewicz, Batsevich, Bacevich

Bacevičius is a Lithuanian surname. Notable people with the surname include:

- Vaidotas Bacevičius (1882–1957), Lithuanian politician, M.P.
- Vytautas Bacevičius (1905–1970), Lithuanian composer
