= Namiko Hatsuse =

Japanese actress (1889–1951)

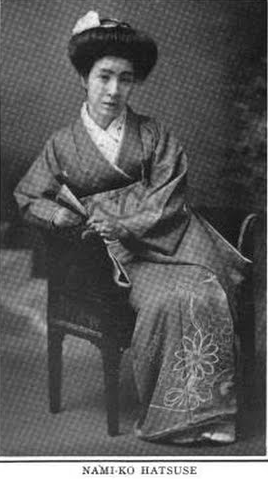
Nami-ko Hatsuse, from a 1914 publication.

Namiko Hatsuse (初瀬 浪子, August 1889 – 1951), also written Nami-ko Hatsuse and Hatsuse Namiko, was the stage name of a Japanese actress, born Hideko Iwao.

== Early life and education ==
Hideko Iwao was born in Tokyo, the daughter of Tosui Iwao. As Namiko Hatsuse, she was one of the first graduates of Kawakami Sadayakko's Actress Training Institute.

== Career ==
Hatsuse specialized shingeki style acting in modern and Western dramas on the Tokyo stage. She was part of the Imperial Theatre Troupe. Her roles included one of the sisters in Maurice Maeterlinck's The Death of Tintagiles (1912), the young wife in Bjornstjerne Bjornson's The Newly Married Couple, and Karaginu in The Treachery of Terutora (1913). She played the koto in character in The Treachery of Terutora. She was also recognized for roles in Shakespeare adaptations, including Mistress Page in The Merry Wives of Windsor. She also appeared in the film A Woman's Sorrows (1937) directed by Mikio Naruse.

== Personal life ==
Namiko Hatsuse died in 1951, aged 62 years.
