= Joshua Guerrero =

American operatic tenor

- Born: March 19, 1983 (age 43); Las Vegas, Nevada, U.S.
- Education: University of California at Los Angeles; Santa Fe Opera's Apprentice Artist Program
- Occupation: Operatic tenor
- Awards: Operalia Competition

Joshua Guerrero is an American operatic tenor, focused on Italian repertoire. He appeared as Count Almaviva on a recording of Corigliano's The Ghosts of Versailles, which won two Grammy Awards. His first role in Germany was Des Grieux in Puccini's Manon Lescaut at the Oper Frankfurt.

== Career ==
Born in Las Vegas, Nevada, Guerrero was inspired to sing after hearing a rendition by a seminary choir of John Rutter's The Lord bless you and keep you. He studied opera for two years at the University of California at Los Angeles, graduating in 2012. He was subsequently a member of the Domingo-Colburn-Stein Young Artist Program of the Los Angeles Opera and of the Santa Fe Opera's Apprentice Artist Program. During his time with the former, he was asked to step into the lead role of Count Almaviva in a production of The Ghosts of Versailles, after another tenor withdrew one week before rehearsals started.

He first appeared as Edgardo in Donizetti's Lucia di Lammermoor at the Florida Grand Opera in his 2017 debut with the company. He has sung in France, as Gabriele Adorno in Verdi's Simon Boccanegra at the Opéra National de Bordeaux, in Spain, playing Nemorino in Donizetti's L'elisir d'amore at the Teatro de la Maestranza, and in England at the Glyndebourne Festival in 2018, singing Pinkerton in Puccini's Madama Butterfly. In Caracas, Venezuela, he appeared as Rodolfo in Puccini's La bohème with the Simon Bolivar Symphony Orchestra. In October 2019, he appeared in Germany for the first time, at the Oper Frankfurt as Des Grieux in Puccini's Manon Lescaut alongside Asmik Grigorian in the title role. A review noted that his voice was both beautifully mellow and strikingly powerful, even in the high register ("... schönstem Tenorschmelz und markant kräftiger Stimmgebung auch in den Höhen"), and his acting like a Latin lover. Another reviewer described his voice as well-focused and radiant, with passion and a talent for sobbing well suited to Puccini, particularly in this role ("eine gut sitzende, strahlende Stimme, mit dem Schuss Leidenschaft und Talent zum Schluchzen, die sich besonders bei (diesem) Puccini ganz gut machen").

In concert, Guerrero sang the tenor solo in Beethoven's Ninth Symphony with the Simón Bolivar Orchestra conducted by Gustavo Dudamel while touring Europe. He sang in Haydn's The Creation with the Los Angeles Philharmonic.

== Awards ==
In 2014, Guerrero won second prize at the Operalia competition, which was directed by Plácido Domingo. The production of John Corigliano's The Ghosts of Versailles, in which he sang Count Almaviva, was recorded and won two 2017 Grammy Awards, for Best Engineered Album, Classical and Best Opera Recording.
