= Mishka Rushdie Momen =

British pianist (born 1992)

Mishka Rushdie Momen (/ˈmɪʃkə ˈrʊʃdi moʊˈmɛn/; born 23 January 1992) is a British classical pianist. She performs internationally with orchestras and as a soloist and chamber musician. She has been a recording artist with Hyperion Records since 2023. In 2025 she won the Critics' Circle Piano Award.

== Early life and education ==
Momen was born in London. As a child she learned the piano and violin, and attended the Purcell School for Young Musicians from the age of six. While at the school Momen experienced racism, which included remarks that, as a member of the global majority, classical music was "not in your blood" or "not in your background", which she dismissed as "ridiculous".

From the age of 14 Momen studied with Imogen Cooper and Joan Havill, with whom she later studied at the Guildhall School of Music and Drama. In 2018–2021 she attended the Kronberg Academy, studying with Sir András Schiff. She has regularly attended the International Musicians Seminar, Prussia Cove.

She has also studied periodically with American pianist Richard Goode, who reported that "she has the rare ability to communicate the essential meaning of whatever she plays".

== Career ==
Momen rose to international prominence in June 2020, during the COVID-19 pandemic, when she gave a live-streamed recital with Steven Isserlis at Wigmore Hall. In 2021 she gave her debut at Carnegie Hall. In 2023 she signed with London-based arts management company HarrisonParrott and Hyperion Records.

In 2021 Momen was The Times Arts critics' chosen nominee in the field of classical music for their 2021 Breakthrough Award. In 2025 The Guardian described her as "a pianist of graceful poise and sensitivity", and classical review website Bachtrack listed her as a rising star.

In 2024 she gave her solo debut with the London Philharmonic Orchestra in Clara Schumann's Piano Concerto.

She has appeared in recital at Wigmore Hall, Lucerne Festival, Tonhalle Zürich, Hamburg Elbphilharmonie, Antwerp deSingel, The Phillips Collection, The Frick Collection and 92nd Street Y.

In 2024 Momen released her critically-acclaimed solo album, Reformation, which featured early English and Dutch composers John Bull, William Byrd, Jan Pieterszoon Sweelinck and Orlando Gibbons. The album topped the Official Specialist Classical Charts for two weeks of July 2024.

As a chamber musician Momen has partnered with Ian Bostridge, Guy Johnston, Zlatomir Fung, Joshua Bell, Midori and Anthony Marwood.

== Personal life ==
Momen resides in London. Her uncle is the novelist Sir Salman Rushdie. In September 2025 she announced that she was engaged.
