= Lithuanian State Symphony Orchestra =

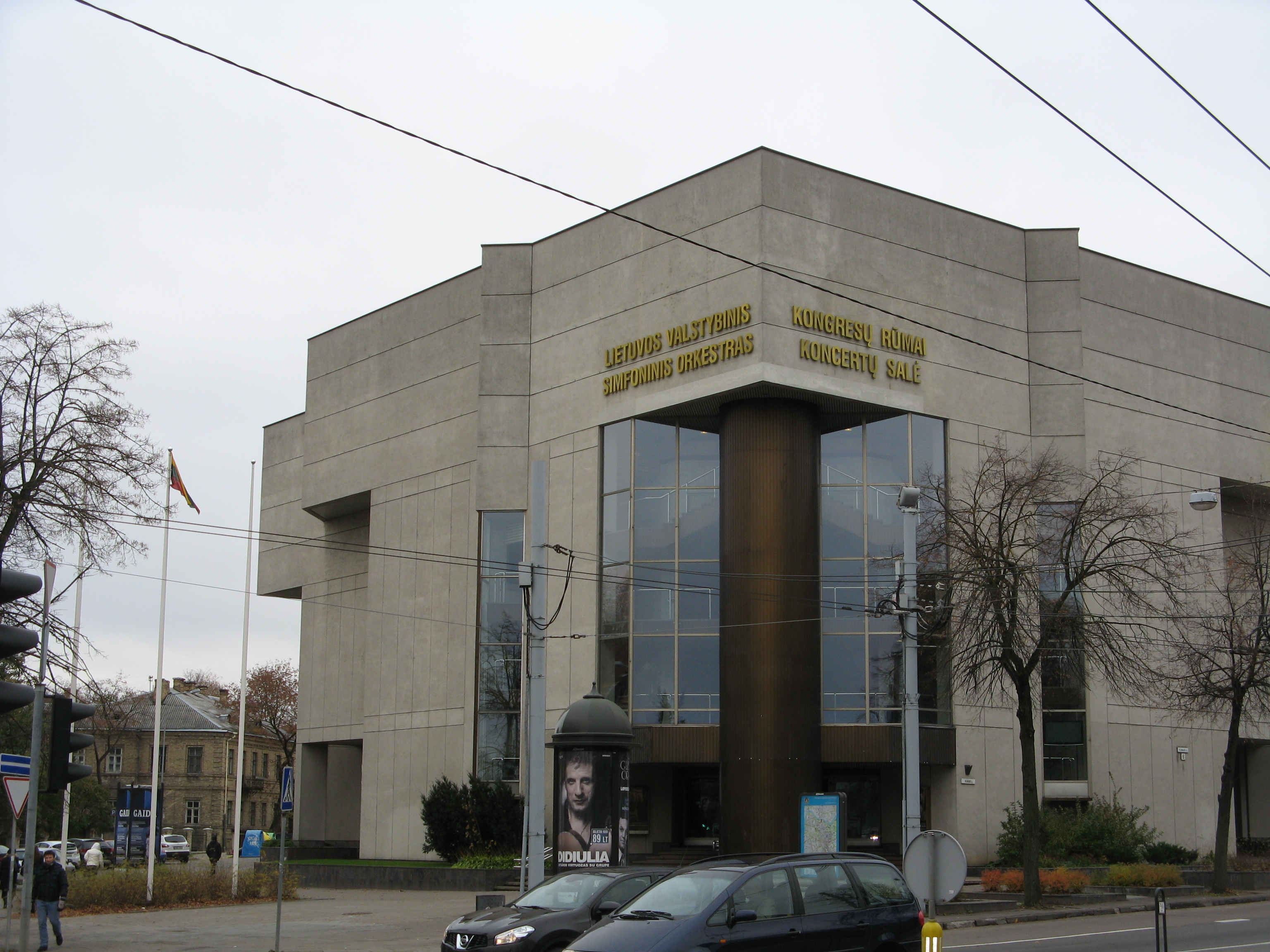
Lithuanian State Symphony Orchestra

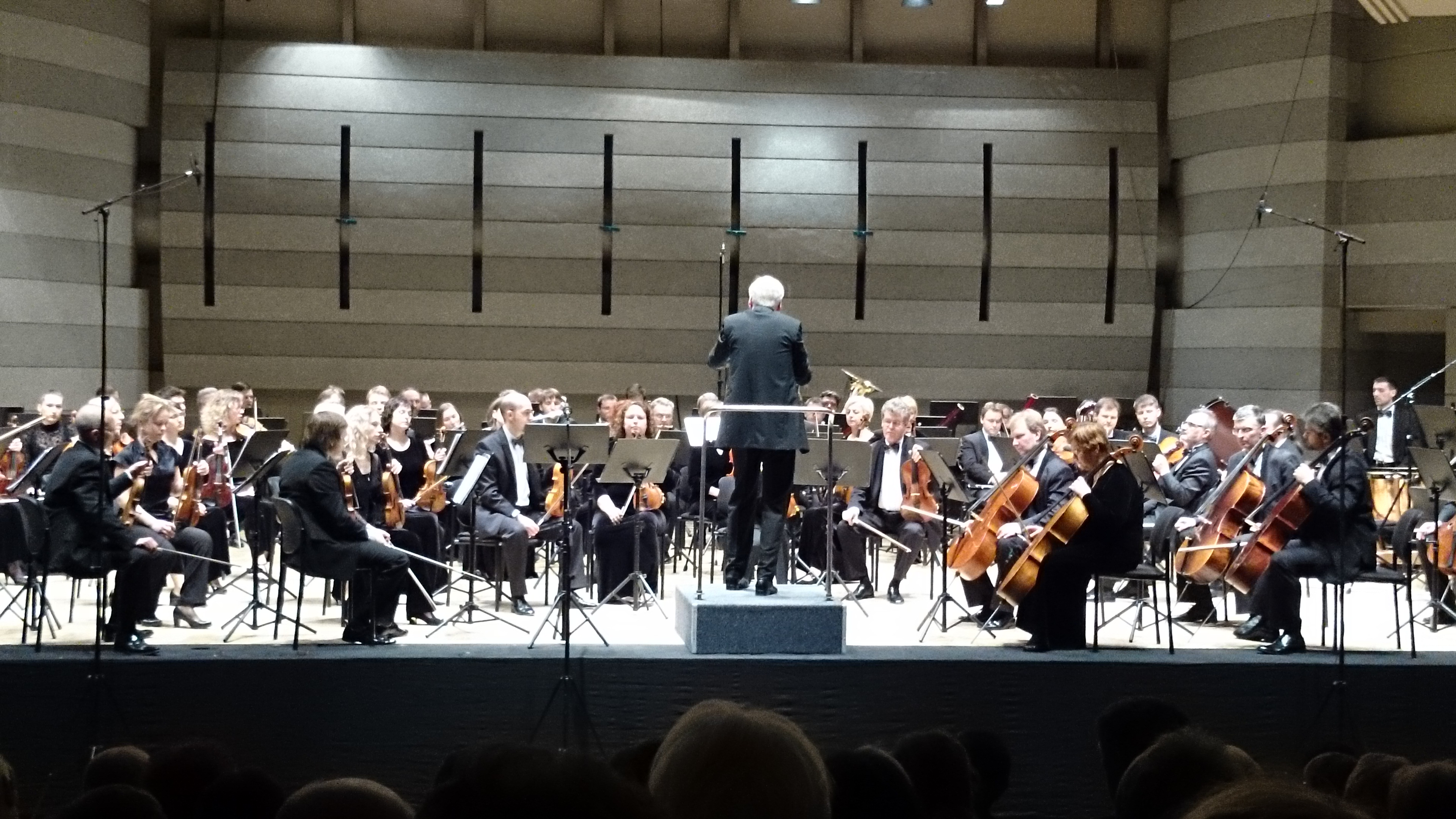
Conductor Gintaras Rinkevičius

The Lithuanian State Symphony Orchestra (Lithuanian: Lietuvos valstybinis simfoninis orkestras or LVSO) is one of Lithuania's two national orchestras, founded in 1988. The other, the Lithuanian National Symphony Orchestra (LNSO, Lietuvos nacionalinis simfoninis orkestras) was founded in 1940.

The orchestra began as a group of young musicians led by Gintaras Rinkevičius in 1988, which gave its first concert on January 30, 1989. One of the most famous conductor in Lithuania, the National Award winner Gintaras Rinkevičius (b. 1960) is a Lithuanian State Symphony Orchestra‘s founder, artistic director and chief conductor. Current conductors include Ričardas Šumila and Martynas Staškus. The orchestra staged over a dozen operas, starting with Richard Wagner's The Flying Dutchman directed by Oskaras Koršunovas in 1995. Six other operas were directed by Dalia Ibelhauptaitė.

== Recordings ==
- Vytautas Bacevičius Orchestral Works 2007
