= Nadja Stefanoff =

German operatic soprano

- Born: 22 July 1976 (age 49); Karl-Marx-Stadt, East Germany
- Education: Musikhochschule Dresden
- Occupation: Operatic soprano
- Organization: Staatstheater Mainz
- Website: www.nadja-stefanoff.com

Nadja Stefanoff (born 22 July 1976) is a German operatic soprano based at the Staatstheater Mainz. She began her career as a mezzo-soprano. She has performed leading roles there and as a guest at major opera houses in Europe, such as Marta in Weinberg's Die Passagierin at the Oper Graz, and Giordano's Fedora at the Oper Frankfurt.

== Career ==
Stefanoff was born in Karl-Marx-Stadt, the daughter of Bulgarian tenor Stefan Stefanoff. She studied voice at the Musikhochschule Dresden, graduating in 2010. She was successful at competitions, such as a third prize at Bundeswettbewerb Gesang in Berlin in 2002, and winner of the Orpheum Public Award for Mozart in Zürich in 2004. She became a member of the Theater Erfurt, then of the Stadttheater Pforzheim and from 2007 to 2014 at Theater Bremen. She moved to soprano roles in 2013. Stefanoff appeared as a guest at the Deutsche Oper am Rhein, Staatsoper Stuttgart, Komische Oper Berlin and Oper Bonn. She made recordings with the Staatsoperette Dresden.

She moved to the Staatstheater Mainz with the 2014/15 season. She performed there the title roles of Cherubini's Mèdèe, Bellini's Norma and Puccini's Manon Lescaut and Tosca, and as Madame Lidoine in Poulenc's Dialogues des Carmélites.

In the 2020/21 season, she appeared as Marta in Weinberg's Die Passagierin at the Oper Graz, recorded on CD. Stefanoff portrayed the title role, a Russian princess, of Giordano's Fedora at the Oper Frankfurt in a new production in 2022, directed by Christof Loy and conducted by Lorenzo Passerini, alongside Jonathan Tetelman as Loris Ipanov. Reviewer Jan Brachmann from the FAZ noted the brilliance and agility of her voice, assertive even when singing softly.
