= Vasily Barkhatov =

Russian stage director (born 1983)

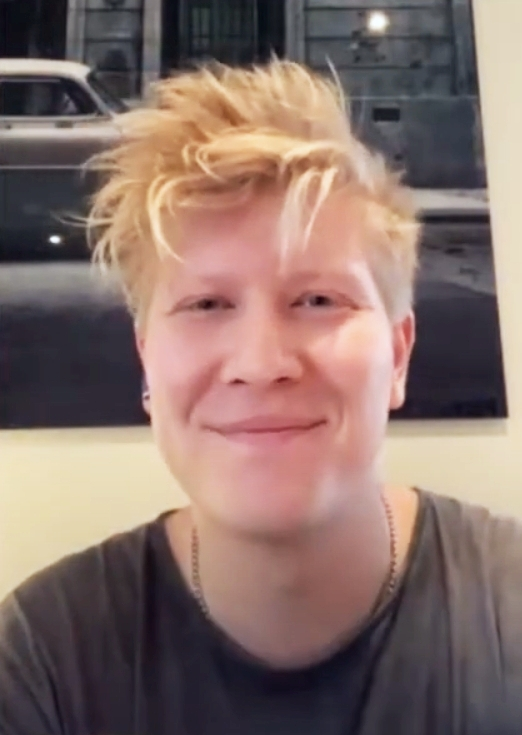
Vasily Barkhatov in 2020

Vasily Alexeevich Barkhatov (Russian: Василий Алексеевич Бархатов; born 1983) is a Russian stage director.

== Early life ==
Vasily Barkhatov was born in Moscow in 1983. In 2004 he interned at the Komische Oper in Berlin, where he was mentored by producer Peter Konwitschny. A year later, he graduated from the Russian Institute of Theatre Art where he was under guidance from Raissa Nemchinskaya.

== Career ==
=== Bolshoi Theatre ===
In 2004, he staged The Diary of One Who Disappeared at the Helikon Opera. In the same year, he performed an operatic duology called The Music Director, as well as Antonio Salieri's Prima la musica e poi le parole and Mozart's Der Schauspieldirektor, the latter two of which were staged at the Rostov State Musical Theatre. In 2009, he staged Les brigands at the Moscow Pushkin Drama Theatre and in 2010 he directed The Umbrellas of Cherbourg at the Karambol Theatre and Die Fledermaus at Bolshoi. In 2011, he directed Perfidy and Love at the Comedian’s Refuge Theatre and directed the film Atomic Ivan. In 2012, he traveled to Lithuania, where he staged Eugene Onegin at the Lithuanian National Opera and Ballet Theatre. Upon returning to Moscow, he staged Die neuen Leiden des jungen W. at the Chekhov Moscow Art Theatre.

=== Mariinsky Theatre ===
At Mariinsky Theatre he was a stage and production designer for Shostakovich's Moscow, Cheryomushki in 2006 and Janáček's Jenůfa, Berlioz's Benvenuto Cellini and Verdi's Otello in 2007. In 2008, he staged Smelkov's The Brothers Karamazov and Rodion Shchedrin's Dead Souls. In 2011 he was a stage director of Offenbach's The Tales of Hoffmann.

In 2012 he, along with Anna Makhova and Dmitry Renansky, announced the creation of the theatre's Modern Opera Lab.

=== Mikhaylovsky Theatre ===
In 2011, Mikhaylovsky Theatre director Vladimir Kehman invited Barkhatov to become the theatre's artistic director, a position Barkhatov began in 2013. His first opera project at the theatre was a production of Der fliegende Holländer. Barkhatov also staged a gala concert in honor of the theatre's anniversary. Barkhatov announced his resignation from the position in 2014, shortly before his staging of Eugene Onegin opened the theatre's season.

=== Work in European theatres ===
Since 2014, Barkhatov has been working extensively with theatres in Western Europe. He staged the operas La Damnation de Faust at the National Theatre Mannheim in 2015, Khovanshchina (2015) and Madama Butterfly (2019) at the Theater Basel, Die Soldaten at the Hessisches Staatstheater Wiesbaden in 2016, and the world premiere of L'Invisible in 2017 at the Deutsche Staatsoper Berlin. His work in Central and Northern European theatres included La fanciulla del West at the Hungarian National Opera in 2018, Eugene Onegin at the Royal Opera in Stockholm in 2018, Tosca at the Hannover Opera in 2019, and The Gambler at the Lithuanian National Opera and Ballet Theatre in 2020.

Barkhatov briefly returned to Russia in 2021 with Faust at the Perm Opera, only to leave again once the Russian invasion of Ukraine started. His recent directorial work in Western Europe includes Turandot at the Teatro di San Carlo in 2023, Norma at the Theater an der Wien, in 2024–25, Rusalka at the Deutsche Oper am Rhein in 2025 and others.

In 2025 he directed Lady Macbeth of Mtsensk by Dmitri Shostakovich for the season opening at Teatro alla Scala in Milan.

== Awards ==
In 2009, Barkhatov received the Golden Mask award for his staging of The Brothers Karamazov.

He was nominated for the International Opera Awards as the best opera director in 2019.

== Family ==
Barkhatov is married to soprano Asmik Grigorian.
