= Chad Lawson =

American musician (born 1975)

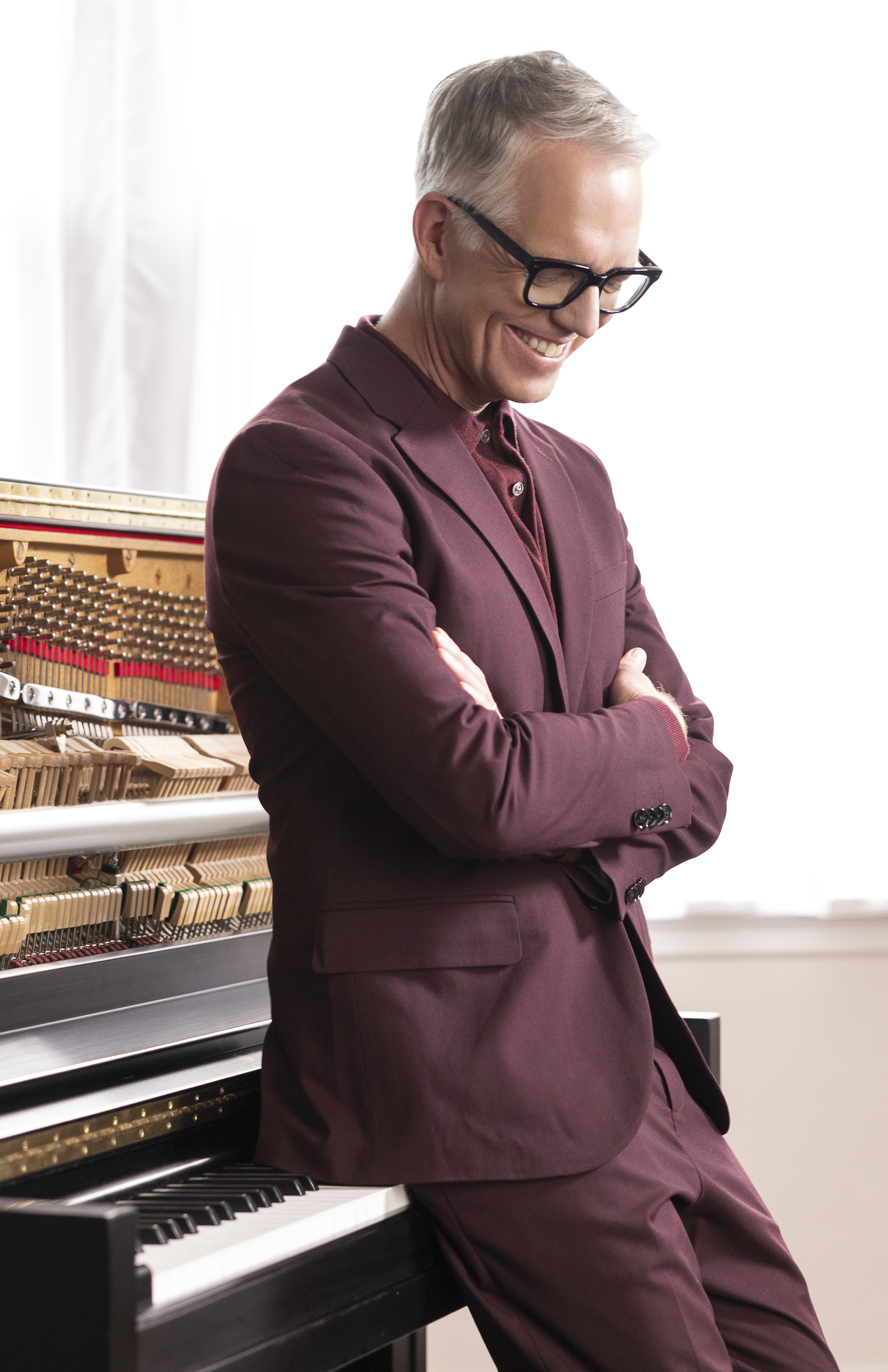
- Lawson in 2024

Background information
- Born: March 26, 1975 (age 51); Morganton, North Carolina, United States
- Genres: New age; classical; jazz
- Occupations: Pianist; composer; podcaster
- Instrument: Piano
- Years active: 1997–present
- Labels: Decca Records US; Hillset; Universal Music Classics
- Website: chadlawson.com

Chad Lawson is an American pianist, composer, and podcaster. After performing as a member of the Summit Records act Chad Lawson Trio from 1997 to 2004, Lawson performed as a member of Julio Iglesias' tour band, which inspired him to release his debut studio album Set on a Hill (2009). Lawson's fifth studio album The Chopin Variations (2014), a collaboration with violinist Judy Kang and cellist Rubin Kodheli, reached number one on the Billboard Top Classical Albums chart. He debuted as a major label musician through Decca Records US in 2020, with the extended play Stay. Lawson is known as the composer of the podcasts Lore and Unobscured, both works created by Aaron Mahnke.

Lawson is the creator and host of iHeart Radio Award-nominated podcast Calm It Down, which explores mental health topics and meditation techniques soundtracked by his music. He is also a breathwork coach who completed his certification at the Loka Yoga School, and was named a UN ambassador for the World Federation for Mental Health in 2024.

== Career ==
Lawson did not come from a musical family, and was inspired to play piano at five years old by watching the band Sha Na Na perform in their eponymous 1970s television series. He was classically trained in piano, and spent his high school years dreaming of attending the Peabody Institute, however the conservatory turned down his application after hearing that Lawson aimed to become a studio musician. Lawson started composing songs when he was given his first keyboard, a Korg M1, and played piano in a cover band during high school.

Lawson attended the Berklee College of Music where he majored in jazz performance, which was his first experience learning improvisation. While attending college, Lawson successfully worked as a studio musician, to the point where he did not see much of a reason to keep attending the school. After leaving Berklee, Lawson toured with guitarist Babik Reinhardt, later attending the Appalachian State University for a semester to learn computer science, before moving to Charlotte, North Carolina. In 1997, Lawson formed the Chad Lawson Trio alongside drummer Al Sergel, and bassist Zack Page, and recorded their debut album as a Christmas present for his mother. Lawson did not intend to release the album at first, however after submitting the work for a radio station competition and winning, decided to self-release the album. The trio released two further albums: Dear Dorothy: The Oz Sessions (2002), a jazz reinterpretation of the music of The Wizard of Oz (1939) released through Summit Records, and Unforeseen (2004), an album that mixed original compositions with jazz standards, as well as covers of Soundgarden and The Police. Lawson then moved to New York to continue his studies, studying with pianist Hal Galper, and privately with the head of the Manhattan School of Music, Garry Dial. In 2007, Lawson performed internationally as a member of Julio Iglesias' tour band. Experiencing Iglesias' tour inspired Lawson to record music as a soloist.

In 2009 after returning to the United States, Lawson released his debut solo album Set on a Hill, a primarily improvised jazz piano album produced by William Ackerman. The album was awarded the album of the year by Whisperings: Solo Piano Radio. After the release of the album, Lawson moved back to Charlotte after experiencing health problems. His sophomore album, The Piano (2011), was awarded the SoloPiano.com classical album of the year. Lawson's 2013 album The Space Between was mostly written in a single day, and songs from the album were widely broadcast through RTVE and Echoes.

In 2014, Lawson released the album The Chopin Variations, a double album reinterpreting the works of Chopin (one side solo piano, one side collaborations with violinist Judy Kang and cellist Rubin Kodheli), which was widely successful, reaching number one on the Billboard Top Classical Albums chart. In 2015, Lawson collaborated with veteran electro producer Man Parrish on the album Beautiful. Lawson followed The Chopin Variations with a second classical re-imagining in 2016, this time of Bach's chorale works.

From 2016, Lawson began acting as the composer for the podcast Lore, as well as the podcast's Prime Video adaptation. Lawson collaborated with Lore creator Aaron Mahnke again for the soundtracks of his podcast Unobscured, and the theme song for the podcast Cabinet of Curiosities.

Lawson's 2018 album Re:Piano saw him experiment with loops and effects using an iPad, and reached number five on the Billboard Classical Albums chart.

In 2020, Lawson released his debut major label extended play, Stay, through Decca Records US. The album was written in honor of Mental Health Awareness Month in the US.

Decca Records US released his debut major label album, You Finally Knew, on September 11, 2020, and a Deluxe Edition of the album the following year.

Decca released his next album, a double album titled Breathe, on September 23, 2022 to coincide with National Suicide Prevention and Awareness Month. It was recorded at Abbey Road Studios and included collaborations with violinist Esther Yoo and cellist-composer Peter Gregson.

In 2023 Lawson performed at the Universal Music + Health Summit hosted by Arianna Huffington and Sir Lucien Grainge.

In July 2024 Decca released his next album, Where We Are.

=== Calm It Down ===
Chad Lawson created, writes, voices, and produces the independent podcast, Calm It Down. The podcast airs on a weekly basis, and is released every Tuesday.

Launched in September 2020, Calm It Down guides listeners through techniques for breathing and meditation while tackling mental health subjects such as anxiety and suicide. Each 15-minute episode aims to give listeners a break from the stresses of modern life, while also offering tools for positive, constructive, and encouraging ways to process thoughts. Lawson first had the idea for the Calm It Down podcast from the many messages he received from fans of his musical career, who would recount to him how his music helped them through many dark and difficult times in their lives. By combining his music, experiences, and meditation techniques, Lawson is able to bring his passion for mental health and emotional wellbeing to an even bigger audience. Calm It Down was nominated in 2021 for an iHeartRadio Podcast Award in the category of best Spirituality and Religious podcast.

== Artistry ==
Lawson cites Reese Wynans, Keith Jarrett and Benmont Tench as his biggest musical influences.

== Personal life ==
Lawson met his wife Barbara in Charlotte, North Carolina, when he waited tables at the Capital Grille steakhouse. The pair married in 2006 after Lawson moved to New York City. Together they have two sons.

== Discography ==
=== Studio albums ===
Title	Details	Peak chart positions	
Title	Details	US Classical	US New Age
Set on a Hill	Released: March 10, 2009; Label: Hillset Records; Formats: CD, digital download	—	—
The Piano	Released: October 9, 2011; Label: Hillset Records; Formats: CD, digital download	—	—
A Solo Piano Christmas	Released: November 1, 2011; Label: Hillset Records; Formats: CD, digital download	—	—
The Space Between	Released: June 4, 2013; Label: Hillset Records; Formats: CD, digital download	—	—
The Chopin Variations	Released: September 23, 2014; Label: Hillset Records; Formats: CD, digital download	1	—
Bach Interpreted: Piano Variations on Bach Chorales	Released: April 29, 2016; Label: Self-released; Formats: CD, digital download	—	—
Re:Piano	Released: March 23, 2018; Label: Self-released; Formats: CD, digital download	5	—
You Finally Knew	Released: September 11, 2020; Label: Decca Records US; Formats: CD, vinyl, digital download	4	3
Breathe	Released: September 23, 2022; Label: Decca Records US; Formats: CD, vinyl, digital download	2	2
Where We Are	Released: July 19, 2024; Label: Decca Records US; Formats: CD, vinyl, digital download	24	22
"—" denotes items which were not released in that country or failed to chart.

=== Extended plays ===
Title	Details	Peak chart positions
Title	Details	US Classical
Summer Suite, Vol. 1	Released: June 21, 2010; Label: Hillset Records; Formats: digital download	—
Autumn Suite, Vol. 1	Released: October 7, 2010; Label: Hillset Records; Formats: digital download	—
Songs of Prayer: Solo Piano Music for Prayer	Released: October 30, 2012; Label: Hillset Records; Formats: digital download	—
The Broad Sun	Released: September 1, 2017; Label: Self-released; Formats: 12" single, digital download	—
The Waning Moon	Released: July 6, 2018; Label: Self-released; Formats: digital download	—
Stay	Released: May 1, 2020; Label: Universal Music Classics, Decca Records; Formats: digital download	18
Comfort	Released: April 9, 2021; Label: Universal Music Group; Formats: digital download	—
Christmas in My Dreams	Released: October 23, 2021; Label: Decca Records US; Formats: digital download	—
irreplaceable	Released: May 13, 2022; Label: Decca Records US; Formats: digital download	—
Drift	Released: March 17, 2023; Label: Decca Records US; Formats: digital download	—
Sama Vritti (Guided Breathwork Exercise)	Released: May 11, 2023; Label: Decca Records US; Formats: digital download	—
Nadi Shodhana (Guided Breathwork Exercise)	Released: May 16, 2023; Label: Decca Records US; Formats: digital download	—
Diaphragmatic (Guided Breathwork Exercise)	Released: May 23, 2023; Label: Decca Records US; Formats: digital download	—
4-7-8 (Guided Breathwork Exercise)	Released: May 30, 2023; Label: Decca Records US; Formats: digital download	—
Drift (Lo-Fi Remixes)	Released: February 2, 2024; Label: Decca Records US; Formats: digital download	—
"—" denotes items which were not released in that country or failed to chart.

=== Soundtracks ===
Title	Details
Dark Conclusions: The Lore Variations	Released: October 28, 2016; Label: Self-released; Formats: CD, digital download
A Grave Mistake: The Lore Variations 2017	Released: October 20, 2017; Label: Self-released; Formats: CD, LP, digital download
Home Sweet Home: The 2018 Lore Variations	Released: November 2, 2018; Label: Self-released; Formats: CD, digital download
Unobscured (Season 1 - Original Podcast Soundtrack)	Released: December 18, 2019; Label: Universal Music Classics; Formats: digital download
Unobscured (Season 2 - Original Podcast Soundtrack)	Released: December 18, 2019; Label: Universal Music Classics; Formats: digital download

=== Singles ===
Title	Year	Album
"Song of Prayer (Solo Piano Music for Prayer)"	2011	Non-album singles
"Auld Lang Syne"	2015	Non-album singles
"I Wish I Knew"	2015	The Space Between
"Waiting, Holding, Breathing"	2016	Piano Cloud Series - Volume Two
"Restless One"	2016	Non-album singles
"Falling Ocean"	2016	Non-album singles
"She"	2019	Unobscured (Season 1 - Original Podcast Soundtrack)
"Sweet Power of Song, Woo. 152 No. 2 (Arr. by Chad Lawson for Piano)"	2020	Non-album singles
"Of Twilight Skies"	2020	Non-album singles
"Stay"	2020	Stay
"One Day You Finally Knew"	2020	Stay
"Stay (Arranged for Flute)"	2021	Non-album singles
"Silent Night"	2021	Christmas in My Dreams
"Stay (Slowed Remixes)"	2022	Non-album singles
"You Finally Knew (Slowed Remixes)"	2022	Non-album singles
"The Windmills of Your Mind"	2022	Non-album singles
"Fields of Forever"	2022	Breathe
"This Is What Love Is"	2022	Breathe
"The Color of the Sky (Solo Piano)"	2022	Breathe
"Irreplaceable (Solo Piano)"	2022	Irreplaceable
"To Hold the Stars in the Palm of Your Hand (Solo Piano)"	2022	Irreplaceable
"The Color of the Sky (Sleep Rework)"	2023	Drift
"Fields of Forever (Sleep Rework)"	2023	Drift
"Of Twilight Skies (Sleep Rework)"	2023	Non-album singles
"Matilda" (Harry Styles cover)	2023	Non-album singles
"In the Waiting (Endel Sleep Soundscape)"	2024	You Finally Knew (Endel Sleep Soundscape)
"Sanctuary"	2024	Where We Are
"'Like the Stars in the Sky'"	2024	Where We Are
"Of Wonder"	2024	Where We Are
"Of Twilight Skies (Dream Rework)"	2024	Non-album singles
"This Is Me Trying" (Taylor Swift cover)	2024	Non-album singles
