= Benjamin Attahir =

French composer, violinist, and conductor

- Born: 25 February 1989; Toulouse
- Occupations: Composer, classical violinist, conductor

Benjamin Attahir (born 25 February 1989 in Toulouse) is a French composer, violinist and conductor.

== Biography ==
He studied at Conservatoire de Toulouse, at the Conservatoire à Rayonnement Régional de Paris under Édith Canat de Chizy and at the Conservatoire de Paris itself.

He studied the violin under Ami Flammer.

Attahir made three short plays for marionettes by Maurice Maeterlinck, La Mort de Tintagiles, Intérieur and Alladine et Palomides, into an opera entitled Le Silence des ombres, premiered at La Monnaie in Brussels in September 2019.

On 21 February 2020, BBC Radio 3 broadcast a concert including his Al Asr string quartet (2017), performed by the Arod Quartet, recorded at Perth Concert Hall, Scotland in 2018.

Attahir has also put to music W. B. Yeats's poem 'The song of wandering Aengus'.

On September 30, 2026, his clarinet concerto "Love Is Louder" was premiered by the Schleswig-Holstein Symphony Orchestra in Flensburg, Germany.
