= Judy Kang =

- Born: July 13, 1979 (age 46); Toronto, Ontario, Canada
- Origin: Toronto, Ontario
- Genres: classical music pop music
- Occupation: violinist
- Instrument: violin
- Website: Judy Kang

Judy Kang (born July 13, 1979) is a Canadian violinist, model, producer, singer, and composer. Born in Canada to a single mother, she began playing the violin at four years of age in her native Edmonton, Alberta, and has since toured worldwide as soloist with a number of orchestras and ensembles.

== Early life ==
At age 11, Kang began to study at the Curtis Institute of Music on a full scholarship and, at 17, graduated with a Bachelor in Music. She graduated high school at age 15, and was selected as an All American Scholar, one of the top academically gifted students in America, as well as being nominated for the U.S. National Mathematics Award (USNMA). At age 19, she was given a Lily Foldes Scholarship from the Juilliard School, and graduated with a master's degree. She became the first recipient of the Artist Diploma from the Manhattan School of Music. Kang was awarded the 1689 "Baumgartner" Stradivarius, on loan from the Canada Council for the Arts in 1997, 2006 and 2009, and, In 2003, she was awarded the loan of a 1747 Palmason Januarius Gagliano violin. In 2005, she received the Sylva Gelber Foundation Award from the Canada Council for the most talented musician under 30.

== Career ==
Kang has played at music festivals including: Marlboro, Ravinia, Banff, Bargemusic, Manchester, Aspen, the Ottawa International Chamber Music Festival, Lenaudiere, and the Pablo Casals Festival; and at various pop and jazz festivals including: Lollapalooza and the Festival Internacional Jazz Barcelona. Kang released two solo CDs which were nominated for the Opus award and the Gemini award in Canada.

Besides classical music, Kang also explores other styles and is influenced heavily by stories, film, and visuals. She was selected by pop star Lady Gaga as her solo violinist on the Monster Ball world tour in 2010–11, the biggest selling debut tour in history, and has since received attention as "Lady Gaga's violinist" and was dubbed by the singer as "Nurse Judy/Judy from Juilliard". During a European tour, Kang flew to NYC for 30 hours to perform as soloist at Stern Hall at Carnegie Hall. The New York Times commented: "Judy Kang, a Canadian violinist and most likely the only musician to have worked with both Pierre Boulez and Lady Gaga, was featured in Brahms’s Violin Concerto. Ms. Kang, who drew whoops from the audience before playing a single note, offered a lean, focused sound, pinpoint intonation and expressively molded phrasing. Every line seemed to mean something personal in what amounted to an amorous serenade."

== Collaborations and new projects ==
Kang frequently collaborates with artists and composers including Lenny Kravitz, Olafur Arnalds, Alaskan Indie Rock Band, Portugal The Man and is a founding member of Canadian quartet, Made in Canada, performing with them until 2011. She appeared on the Emmy award-winning HBO special Lady Gaga Presents: The MonsterBall World Tour Live from Madison Square Garden, and also appeared on American Idol playing her single "Alejandro".

In 2013, Kang released a self-titled album, "Judy Kang", a modern, experimental mix including her vocal performances, which was self-recorded, composed, and produced. She also writes and produces electronic dream pop through her created alter ego PRAYS.

Kang's many diverse collaborations include working with and performing alongside Ryuichi Sakamoto, who discovered her on YouTube; they have toured Europe and Asia and have released two albums for Decca. Other projects have included: 'FutureInREverse' (F.I.R.E.), an experimental New York group, and 'The Simple Machines', a group Kang created as an electro-ambient mix. She toured as a member of string ensemble Sejong. Kang works with the charities Young Audiences and WorldVision in music outreach initiatives.
