= Interior (play) =

1895 play by Maurice Maeterlinck

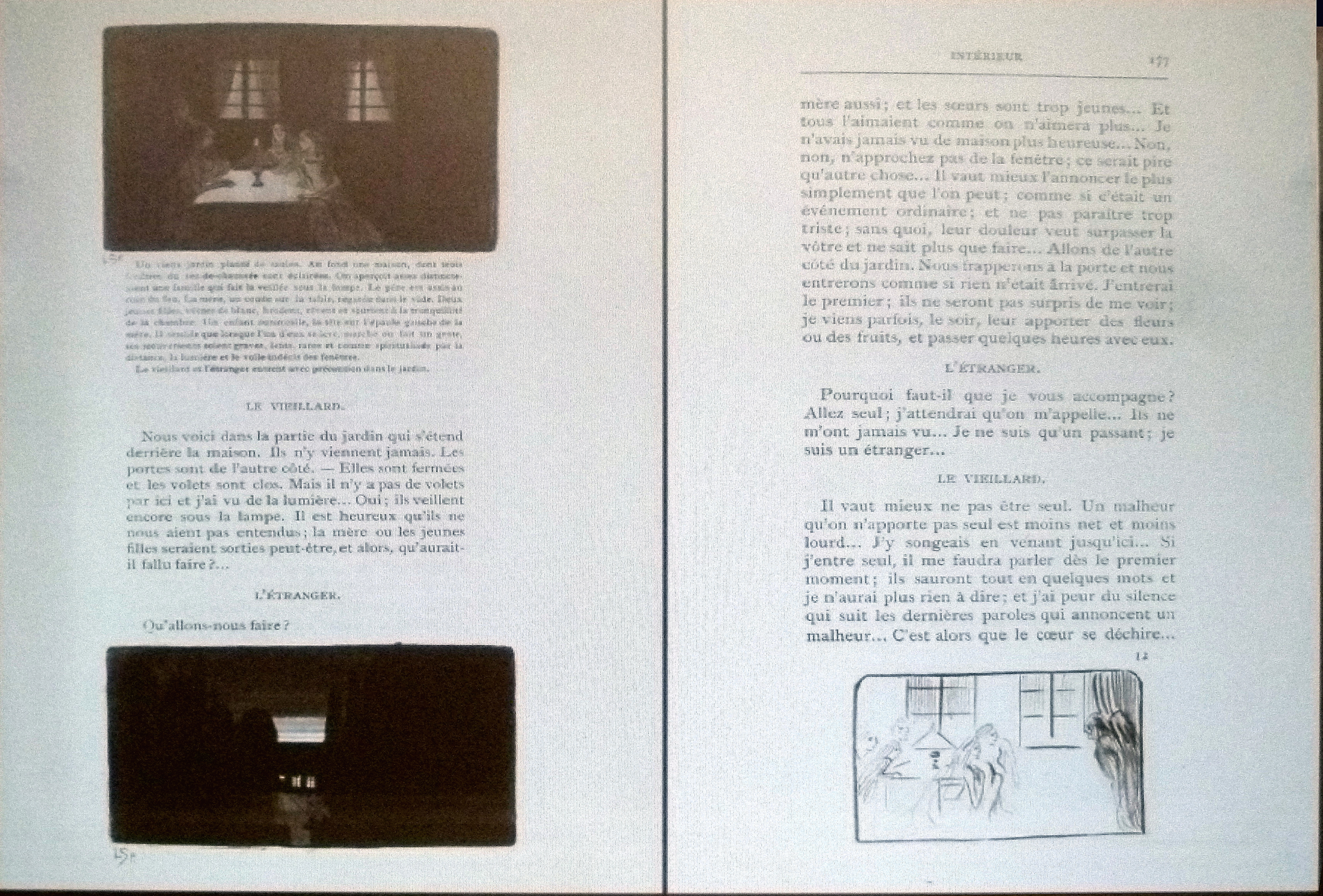
- Intérieur - with illustrations by Léon Spilliaert (1903)
- Written by: Maurice Maeterlinck
- Genre: Symbolism

Premiere
- Date premiered: 15 March 1895

Interior (French: Intérieur) is an 1895 play in rhymed dialogue by Belgian playwright Maurice Maeterlinck. It was one of his few plays intended for marionettes.

== Premiere ==
Interior premiered at the Théâtre de l'Œuvre on March 15, 1895.

== Cast of characters ==
In the garden
- The Old Man
- The Stranger
- Martha
- Mary
- A peasant
- The crowd
In the house
- The father
- The mother
- The two daughters
- The child

== Synopsis ==
The old man and the stranger appear outside the house. The family can be seen within through the windows. The old man and the stranger argue over how to inform the family of the death of one of the daughters. As the crowd approaches with the body, the old man enters the house and can be seen through the windows informing them of their loss.

== Themes ==
The main theme of the play is death. Maeterlinck creates tension by contrasting the anxiety of the characters in the garden with the serenity and ignorance of the family within the house.

Maeterlinck, an avid reader of Arthur Schopenhauer, believed that man was ultimately powerless against the forces of fate. Believing that any actor, due to the limitations of his physical mannerisms and expressions, was unable to portray the symbolic figures of his plays, Maeterlinck decided that marionettes were an excellent alternative. Being guided by strings, which are operated by a puppeteer, marionettes are an excellent representation of fate's complete control over man.

Maeterlinck never clarifies whether the girl's death was a suicide. The stranger says she had been spotted walking along the riverbank. The old man says: "She smiled as they smile who choose to be silent, or who are afraid they will not be understood ... She seemed hardly to hope."

== In other media ==
Three small plays for marionettes by Maurice Maeterlinck, La Mort de Tintagiles, Intérieur and Alladine et Palomides, were made into an opera entitled Le Silence des ombres by Benjamin Attahir premiered at La Monnaie in Brussels in September 2019.
