= Humperdinck =

Humperdinck or Humperdink is a surname. Notable people with the surname include:

- Engelbert Humperdinck (composer) (1854–1921), German composer
- Adelheid Wette née Humperdinck (1858–1916), German author, composer, and folklorist; librettist of her brother Engelbert Humperdinck's opera Hansel and Gretel
- Engelbert Humperdinck (singer) (born 1936), English pop singer
- Oliver Humperdink (born John Jay Sutton) (1949–2011), American professional wrestling manager
- Prince Humperdinck, a character from the 1973 novel The Princess Bride and the 1987 film adaptation of the same name

== See also ==
- Humperdink Duck, a Disney character, grandfather of Donald Duck
