= Vytautas Bacevičius =

Lithuanian composer

Vytautas Bacevičius (9 September 1905, in Łódź, Poland [then Russian Empire] – 15 January 1970, in New York City, United States) was a Lithuanian composer of radical and modernistic leanings. Most of his works are in an atonal idiom of his own devising. He developed a theory of 'cosmic music' and came to regard Schoenberg's 12-note music as out-dated, regarding himself as a successor to Scriabin, André Jolivet and Varèse.

Bacevičius studied in Łódź with, among others, Kazimierz Sikorski and moved to Kaunas in Lithuania in 1926. In 1927 he went to Paris, where he studied composition with Nikolai Tcherepnin and graduated from the Paris Conservatory in 1928. Returning to Lithuania in 1928, he established himself as a pianist and composer and teacher. He became the Chair of the Lithuanian Section of the ISCM. He was on tour in Argentina in 1939 when the Russians invaded Lithuania, rendering him an exile in America. He moved to the United States in 1940 and lived mainly in New York, continuing to give recitals but mainly supporting himself by teaching. He made his New York debut at Carnegie Hall on November 28, 1940. He maintained studios in New York and Bridgeport, Connecticut.

Although born in Poland, he adopted the Lithuanian form of his name (Bacevičius); he was the brother of the Polish composer Grażyna Bacewicz, to whom he dedicated his Second Symphony, Sinfonia della Guerra, in 1940. Bacevičius regarded his orchestral works as the most important part of his output, and composed six symphonies in all as well as four piano concertos, a violin concerto and numerous works for piano solo.

== Works ==
- Worklist

== Recordings ==
- Orchestral Music: Graphique, Poème Électrique, Piano Concerto No. 1, Symphony No. 2 (Sinfonia della Guerra), Symphony No. 6 (Symphonie cosmique); Aidas Puodžiukas, piano. Lithuanian State Symphony Orchestra dir. Vytautas Lukočius and Martynas Staškus, conductors. Toccata Classics 2007
