= The Death of Tintagiles =

1894 play by Maurice Maeterlinck

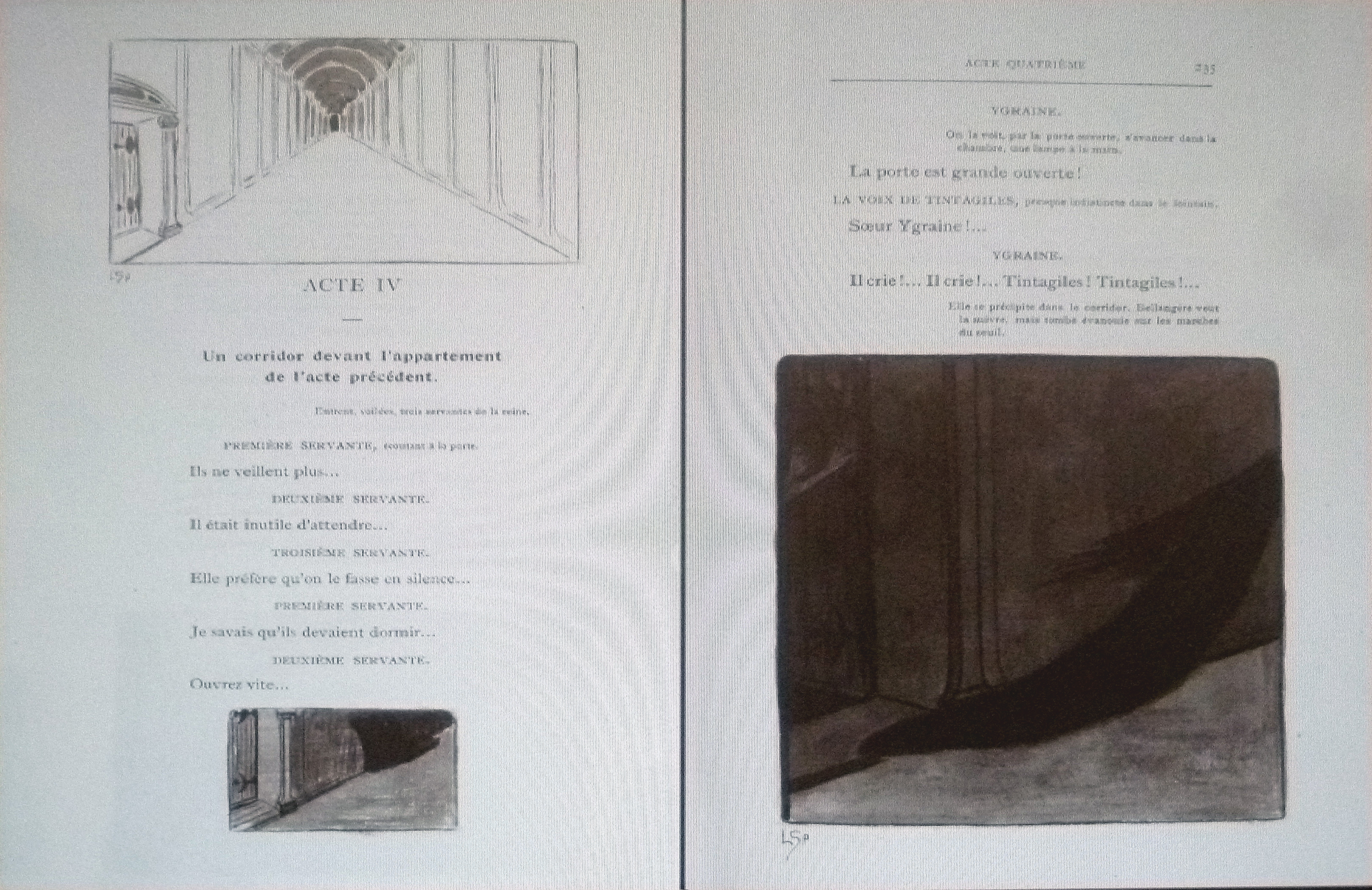
- La Mort de Tintagiles - Act IV - illustrations by Léon Spilliaert (1903)
- Written by: Maurice Maeterlinck

Premiere
- Date: 1894

The Death of Tintagiles (French: La Mort de Tintagiles) is an 1894 play by Belgian playwright Maurice Maeterlinck. It was Maeterlinck's last play for marionettes.

Maeterlinck dedicated the play to Aurélien Lugné-Poe, a theatre director who had supported several of his earlier works.

== Premiere ==
The play was successfully staged by The Theater Studio of the Moscow Art Theater in 1905. This production was directed by Vsevolod Meyerhold and designed by Nikolai Sapunov and Sergei Sudeikin. The production was marked by non-realistic scenery and planned still pictures and poses instead of movement.

Later that year, the play was performed in Paris at the Theatre de Mathurins on Dec. 28, 1905, with music by Jean Nouguès, featuring Mme. Georgette Leblanc, who was also Maeternick's long-time lover.

== Cast of characters ==
- Tintagiles
- Ygraine, sister of Tintagiles
- Bellangère, sister of Tintagiles
- Aglovale
- servants of the Queen

== Synopsis ==
The Queen, who possesses complete control over her servants and people, has killed most of Tintagiles' family. Ygraine and Bellangère try to protect him, but he is captured by the Queen's servants and brought to her castle. Ygraine pursues them to the castle door. Tintagiles cries for help from behind the door, but Ygraine is unable to open it and he is murdered by the Queen.

== Themes ==
Maeterlinck, an avid reader of Arthur Schopenhauer, believed that man was ultimately powerless against the forces of fate. Believing that any actor, due to the limitations of his physical mannerisms and expressions, was unable to portray the symbolic figures of his plays, Maeterlinck decided that marionettes were an excellent alternative. Being guided by strings, which are operated by a puppeteer, marionettes are an excellent representation of fate's complete control over man.

This was the first time Maeterlinck had represented death in the form of a woman (The Queen) rather than a male figure or mysterious force.

Also for the first time, marking a transition in his work, Maeterlinck had his protagonist actively struggle against fate rather than passively or helplessly give in. Ygraine pursues the Queen's servants to the castle door and desperately tries to discover a way of opening it, even though she fails.

== Production ==
The Imaginary Beasts Theater Company of Boston, Massachusetts, performed a rare production of this play in October and November, 2012, at the Boston Center for the Arts Plaza Theaters.

== In other media ==
The Death of Tintagiles was the subject of a symphonic poem written in 1897 by Charles Martin Loeffler. It was scored for full orchestra and two viole d'amore, which represent the voices of Tintagiles and Ygraine. The revised version, which has been commercially recorded, has only one viola d'amore.

In 1913, Ralph Vaughan Williams wrote incidental music for the play. Three years earlier Bohuslav Martinů wrote an orchestral work for the play which is considered impractical for performance.

In 1926 the Belgian composer Jean Absil created a symphonic poem opus 3 with the theme The Death of Tintagiles The English conductor Lawrance Collingwood wrote an opera based on the play, which was premièred in London in April 1950.

Three small plays for marionettes by Maurice Maeterlinck, La Mort de Tintagiles, Intérieur and Alladine et Palomides, were made into an opera entitled Le Silence des ombres by Benjamin Attahir premiered at La Monnaie in Brussels in September 2019.
