= Gintaras Rinkevičius =

Lithuanian conductor

- Born: 20 February 1960 (age 66); Vievis, Lithuanian SSR, USSR
- Occupations: Conductor, professor
- Writing career
- Genre: Classical music

Gintaras Rinkevičius (born February 20, 1960) is a Lithuanian conductor, who was awarded the Lithuanian National Prize for Culture and Arts in 1994. In 1989 he founded the Lithuanian State Symphony Orchestra.

== Life and career ==
Rinkevičius graduated from Lithuania's M. K. Čiurlionis School of Arts, from the Saint Petersburg Conservatory in 1983, and from Moscow State Tchaikovsky Conservatory in 1986. In 1985 he won the Herbert von Karajan Fund International Competition for Conductors in Berlin. Between 1996 and 2003, he served as the Latvian National Opera’s artistic director and chief conductor; he was also chief conductor at the Malmö Opera and Music Theatre from 2002 to 2005.

Among the symphony orchestras he has conducted are the Berliner Symphoniker, the Staatskapelle Weimar, the Tivoli Symphony Orchestra in Copenhagen, the St Petersburg Philharmonic Orchestra, the Russian National Orchestra, and the Russian State Symphony. He has conducted performances in Salzburg, the Royal Albert Hall in London, and the Champs Elysées Theatre in Paris, as well as in Taiwan and Hong Kong. He has been a featured conductor at the Bolshoi Theatre in Moscow since 2003.

Rinkevičius continues to work in Lithuania, staging operas at the Lithuanian National Opera and Ballet Theatre, serving as chief conductor and artistic director of the Lithuanian State Symphony Orchestra, and as a professor at the Lithuanian Academy of Music and Theatre. He has used these opportunities to introduce a number of original compositions by Lithuanian composers, including A Letter to all the Congregation by Algirdas Martinaitis and Agnus Dei by Feliksas Bajoras.

Since September 2007 Gintaras Rinkevičius is also an artistic director and principal conductor of the Novosibirsk Academic Symphony Orchestra.

== Awards and prizes ==
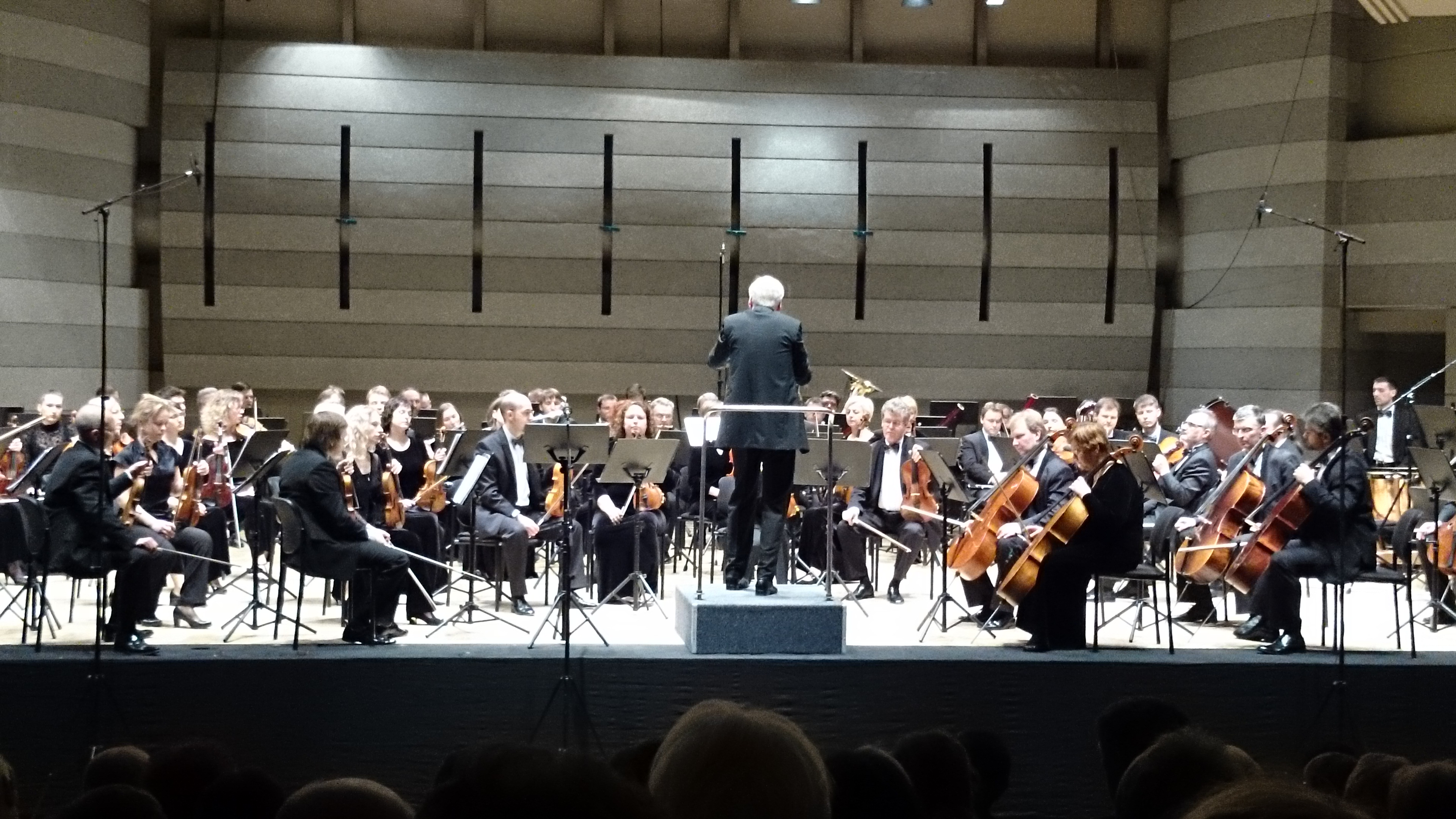
Rinkevičius with Lithuanian State Symphony Orchestra in Kongresų rūmai

- Winner, Fifth Confederate Conductors' Competition in Moscow (1983)
- Laureate, international competition In Memoriam János Ferencsik in Budapest (1986)
- Order of the Lithuanian Grand Duke Gediminas, Fourth Class (1997)
- Grand Latvian Music Award (1997 and 2000)
- Latvian Order of the Three Stars
- Chevalier of the Royal Norwegian Order of Merit
- commander of the Portuguese Order of Merit
