= Freddie De Tommaso =

British-Italian operatic tenor (born 1993)

- Born: 1993 (age 32–33)
- Education: Royal Academy of Music
- Occupation: Operatic tenor
- Years active: 2010s–present

Freddie De Tommaso (born 1993) is a British-Italian operatic tenor. He came to wider public attention in 2021 when he replaced an indisposed singer during a performance of Tosca at the Royal Opera House in London, singing the role of Cavaradossi. He subsequently performed the role at major opera houses, including the Metropolitan Opera in New York.

== Early life and education ==
De Tommaso was born in 1993 and grew up in Tunbridge Wells, Kent. His father was Italian and his mother English. His early exposure to opera came through his family and school choir; his father played recordings by Luciano Pavarotti at the family's Italian restaurant.

He attended Tonbridge School on a scholarship before studying at the Royal Academy of Music in London, where he entered in 2013 as a baritone and later changed to tenor. He graduated in 2018 and subsequently joined the Bavarian State Opera's Opera Studio.

== Career ==
De Tommaso made his Royal Opera House debut in the 2016–17 season as an apprentice in Wagner's Die Meistersinger von Nürnberg. In 2018, he won first prize, the Plácido Domingo Tenor Prize and the Verdi Prize at the Viñas International Singing Competition in Barcelona.

In 2019, he made his role debut as Cassio in Verdi's Otello at the Royal Opera House and appeared as Ismaele in Nabucco at Dutch National Opera. In 2020, he made his debut at the Vienna State Opera as Pinkerton in Puccini's Madama Butterfly.

In December 2021, De Tommaso was scheduled to sing Cavaradossi in the second cast of the Royal Opera House's production of Tosca. When the first-cast tenor Bryan Hymel became unwell during the opening-night performance, De Tommaso replaced him for the second and third acts. He then made his role debut in a subsequent performance. At 28, he was the youngest tenor to sing the role at Covent Garden and the first British tenor to do so since 1963. He returned to the role at the Royal Opera House in December 2022.

De Tommaso made his United States opera debut as Cavaradossi at the Santa Fe Opera in 2023. In November 2024, he made his Metropolitan Opera debut in the same role, opposite Lise Davidsen as Tosca.

In 2024, he appeared as Maurizio in Cilea's Adriana Lecouvreur at the Gran Teatre del Liceu in Barcelona. His roles have also included Don José in Bizet's Carmen, Rodolfo in Puccini's La bohème, and Alfredo in Verdi's La traviata. In 2025, he sang Cavaradossi in a new Royal Opera House production of Tosca.

== Recordings ==
=== CD ===
Verdi: Inno delle nazioni; Quattro Pezzi Sacri (Freddie De Tommaso is tenor soloist on Inno delle nazioni)

- Released: 21 June 2024
- Format: 1-CD
- Label: Decca

Il Tenore (Reviewed by Edinburgh Music Review)

- Released: 24 June 2022
- Format: 1-CD
- Label: Decca

Passione (Reached number one on the UK Official Classical Artist Albums Chart; won the BBC Music Magazine Award for Newcomer in 2022)

- Released: 16 April 2021
- Format: 1-CD
- Label: Decca
