= Jonathan Tetelman =

Chilean-born American operatic tenor (born 1988)

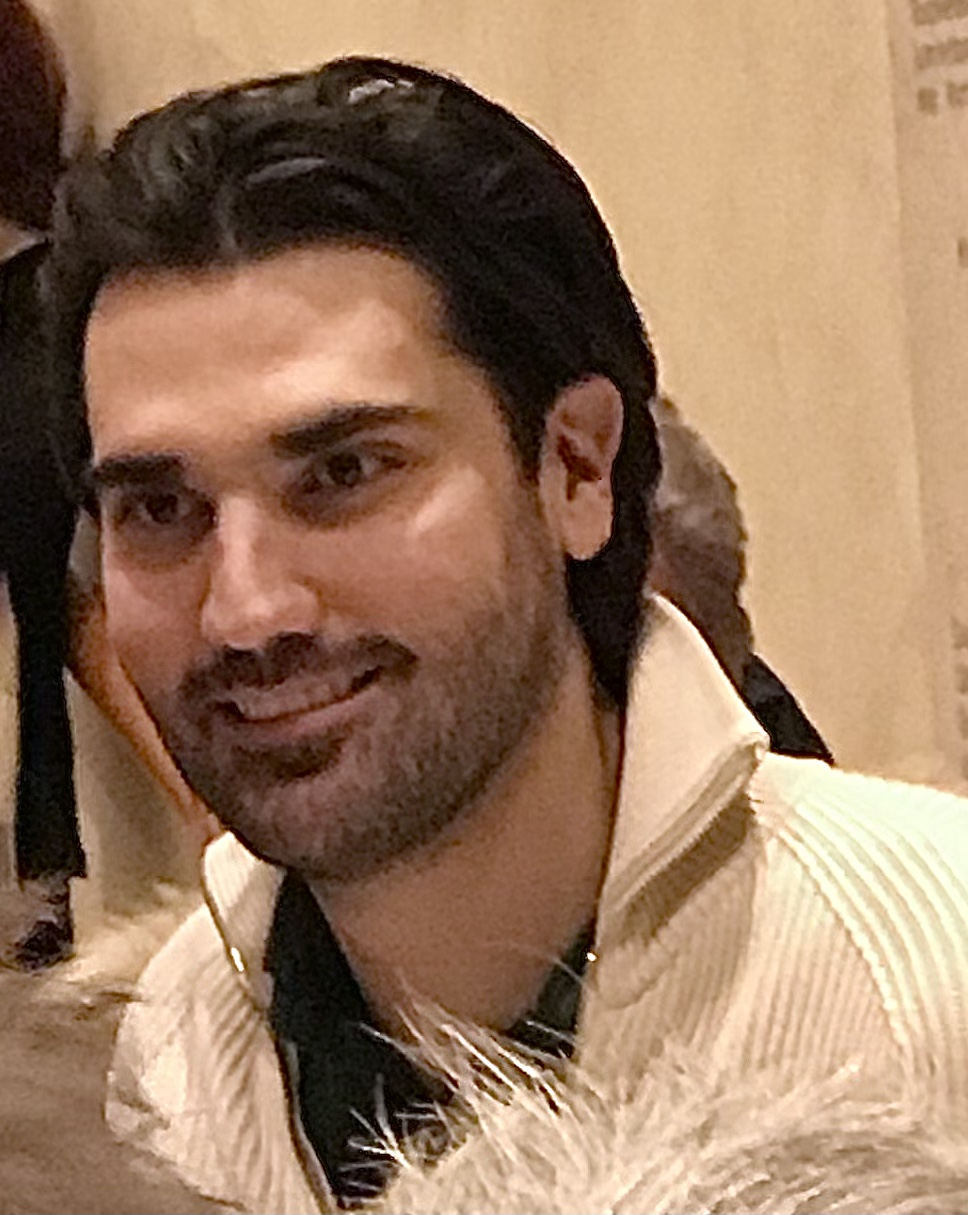
- Tetelman in 2023
- Born: 1988 (age 37–38); Castro, Chile
- Education: Manhattan School of Music; Mannes School of Music
- Occupation: Operatic tenor
- Musical career
- Label: Deutsche Grammophon/Universal Classics
- Website: www.jonathantetelman.com

Jonathan Tetelman (born 1988) is a Chilean American operatic tenor who has established an international career, especially in Europe, in roles such as Alfredo in Verdi's La traviata, the title role in Massenet's Werther, Puccini's Rodolfo in La bohème, Cavaradossi in Tosca and Pinkerton in Madama Butterfly, and Loris Ipanov in Giordano's Fedora.

== Career ==
Tetelman was born in Castro, Chile. He was adopted as a baby and grew up in Hopewell, New Jersey. He studied at the Manhattan School of Music in New York as a baritone before further study at the Mannes School of Music where he made the transition to tenor.

He appeared as Rodolfo in La bohème at the Komische Oper Berlin, the English National Opera and the Royal Opera House and as Cavaradossi at the Teatro Regio in Turin, the Opéra de Lille, the Gran Teatre del Liceu in Barcelona, the Semperoper in Dresden and Deutsche Oper Berlin. He also appeared as Alfredo at the Royal Opera House, as Pinkerton in Madama Butterfly at the Opéra Comédie in Montpellier, and as the title role of Werther at the Teatro Solís in Montevideo. After singing the Duke in Verdi's Rigoletto at Oper Frankfurt, he was invited back in 2022 to perform Loris Ipanov alongside Nadja Stefanoff in the title role of Fedora, leading the Frankfurter Allgemeine Zeitung to describe his voice as "of intense, inescapable euphony, warmly grounded, full-bodied, yet admirably elegant and supple". Another critic called him "ideal" for the role.

Tetelman's concert repertory includes Beethoven's Ninth Symphony, which he has sung with the San Francisco Symphony Orchestra and the Stuttgarter Philharmoniker, Verdi's Requiem and Edward Elgar's The Dream of Gerontius.

In 2021 he signed an exclusive artist contract with Deutsche Grammophon.
