= Sufjan Stevens discography =

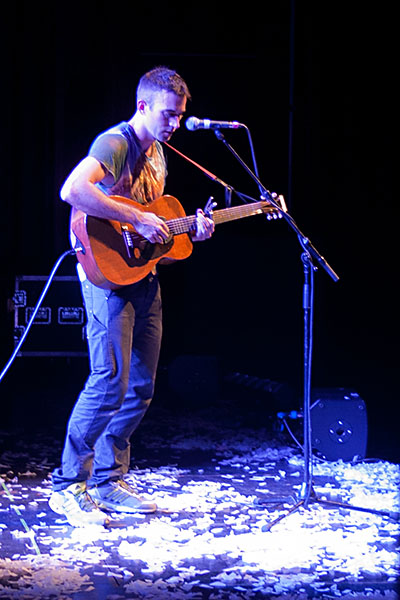
- Sufjan Stevens performing live in Leipzig in 2011
- Studio albums: 13
- Extended plays: 13
- Soundtrack albums: 3
- Live albums: 1
- Compilation albums: 3
- Singles: 20
- Music videos: 8
- Promotional singles: 8
- Guest appearances: 26
- Mixtapes: 2

American singer-songwriter Sufjan Stevens has released thirteen studio albums (including three with additional artists), three compilation albums, three soundtracks, two mixtapes, thirteen extended plays (EP), twenty singles (including one as a featured artist), eight promotional singles, and eight music videos. Through his record label Asthmatic Kitty Records, Stevens released his first two albums A Sun Came and Enjoy Your Rabbit in 2000 and 2001, respectively. For his next two releases – Michigan (2003) and Seven Swans (2004) – the singer partnered with Sounds Familyre Records for the distribution of both releases. Seven Swans was supported by Stevens' debut single "The Dress Looks Nice on You". The same album was reissued in 2009 and included the new single "I Went Dancing with My Sister". His fifth album, Illinois, was his first release to enter record charts, where it reached the lower positions in several countries and was certified Gold by the Recording Industry Association of America for shipments of 500,000 copies. The Avalanche, a compilation album consisting of outtakes from Illinois, was released in 2006 and also reached various charts internationally.

The Age of Adz (2010) was promoted by singles "I Walked" and "Too Much", with the latter song peaking at number 42 on Billboard's Rock Digital Song Sales component chart. The album itself debuted at number 7 on the Billboard 200, becoming Stevens' highest-peaking effort. As of March 2015, The Age of Adz has sold over 138,000 copies in the United States. In a collaborative effort with Bryce Dessner, Nico Muhly, and James McAlister, Stevens released Planetarium through 4AD Records in 2017. It was supported by singles "Saturn" and "Venus". Music videos were created for the two aforementioned songs in addition to album tracks "Mercury" and "Neptune".

He also embarked on a project titled "Songs for Christmas", where he released a series of ten EPs consisting of Christmas songs between December 2000 and December 2010. The first five releases were included on a box set titled Songs for Christmas (2006) while the final five were featured on a second one titled Silver & Gold (2012). Stevens contributed to the official soundtrack to the 2017 drama film Call Me by Your Name, where he provided original songs "Mystery of Love" and "Visions of Gideon". Both songs peaked on the charts in France and the United States, and the former song earned him an Academy Award nomination for Best Original Song.

== Albums ==
=== Studio albums ===
List of studio albums, with selected chart positions, sales figures and certifications
Title	Album details	Peak chart positions										Sales	Certifications
Title	Album details	US	AUS	BEL (FL)	CAN	FRA	GER	NLD	NOR	SWI	UK	Sales	Certifications
A Sun Came	Released: June 13, 2000; Label: Asthmatic Kitty; Formats: CD	—	—	—	—	—	—	—	—	—	—		
Enjoy Your Rabbit	Released: September 17, 2001; Label: Asthmatic Kitty; Formats: CD	—	—	—	—	—	—	—	—	—	—		
Michigan	Released: July 1, 2003; Label: Asthmatic Kitty · Sounds Familyre; Formats: CD · LP	—	—	—	—	—	—	—	—	—	—	US: 27,000	
Seven Swans	Released: March 16, 2004; Label: Sounds Familyre; Formats: CD · LP	—	—	—	—	—	—	—	—	—	—		
Illinois	Released: July 4, 2005; Label: Asthmatic Kitty · Sounds Familyre; Formats: CD · digital download · LP	121	86	—	—	—	—	80	34	—	124	US: 300,000	RIAA: Gold; BPI: Gold
The Age of Adz	Released: October 12, 2010; Label: Asthmatic Kitty; Formats: CD · digital download · LP	7	61	25	—	52	73	75	19	48	30	US: 138,000; UK: 4,822	
Carrie & Lowell	Released: March 30, 2015; Label: Asthmatic Kitty; Formats: Cassette · CD · digital download · LP	10	11	10	9	50	51	6	9	29	6	US: 105,000	RIAA: Gold; BPI: Gold
Planetarium (with Bryce Dessner, Nico Muhly, and James McAlister)	Released: June 9, 2017; Label: 4AD; Formats: CD · digital download · LP	104	—	89	—	120	82	77	—	60	92		
Aporia (with Lowell Brams)	Released: March 24, 2020; Label: Asthmatic Kitty	— (Note: Aporia did not enter the Billboard 200, but peaked at number 94 on the Top Album Sales chart.)	—	—	—	—	—	—	—	—	—		
The Ascension	Released: September 25, 2020; Label: Asthmatic Kitty; Formats: CD · digital download · LP	90	28	28	—	143	26	59	—	44	35		
Convocations	Released: May 6, 2021; Label: Asthmatic Kitty; Formats: Digital download · LP	— (Note: Convocations did not enter the Billboard 200, but peaked at number 59 on the Current Album Sales chart.)	—	—	—	—	—	—	—	—	—		
A Beginner's Mind (with Angelo De Augustine)	Released: September 24, 2021; Label: Asthmatic Kitty; Formats: Digital download · LP	115	—	78	—	—	45	—	—	77	91		
Javelin	Released: October 6, 2023; Label: Asthmatic Kitty; Formats: Digital download · LP	30	46	15	—	41	15	5	—	15	7		
"—" denotes a title that did not chart, or was not released in that territory.

=== Compilation albums ===
List of compilation albums, with selected chart positions
Title	Album details	Peak chart positions										Sales
Title	Album details	US	US Alt	US Folk	US Indie	US Rock	AUS	BEL (FL)	FRA	NOR	UK	Sales
The Avalanche	Released: July 11, 2006; Label: Asthmatic Kitty; Formats: CD · digital download	71	—	—	4	—	97	68	161	—	84	
Songs for Christmas	Released: November 21, 2006; Label: Asthmatic Kitty; Formats: CD · digital download	122	—	—	—	—	—	100	—	36	—	US: 81,000
Silver & Gold	Released: November 12, 2012; Label: Asthmatic Kitty; Formats: CD · digital download · LP	70	14	5	11	23	—	—	—	—	—	
"—" denotes a title that did not chart, or was not released in that territory.

=== Live albums ===
List of live albums, with selected chart positions
Title	Album details	Peak chart positions
Title	Album details	US Indie
Carrie & Lowell Live	Released: April 28, 2017; Label: Asthmatic Kitty; Format: Digital download	39

=== Soundtrack albums ===
List of soundtrack albums, with selected chart positions
Title	Album details	Peak chart positions			
Title	Album details	US	US Indie	US OST	UK Clas.
The BQE	Released: October 20, 2009; Label: Asthmatic Kitty; Formats: CD · digital download · LP	171	18	16	—
The Decalogue	Released: October 18, 2019; Label: Asthmatic Kitty; Performer: Timo Andres; Formats: CD · digital download · LP	—	—	—	—
Reflections	Released: May 19, 2023; Label: Asthmatic Kitty; Performer: Timo Andres & Conor Hanick	—	—	—	10
"—" denotes a title that did not chart, or was not released in that territory.

=== Mixtapes ===
List of mixtapes, with selected chart positions
Title	Mixtape details	Peak chart positions	
Title	Mixtape details	US Folk	US Indie
Chopped and Scrooged	Released: December 11, 2012; Label: Asthmatic Kitty; Format: Digital download	—	—
The Greatest Gift	Released: November 24, 2017; Label: Asthmatic Kitty; Format: CD · Cassette · digital download	10	23

== EPs ==
=== Extended plays ===
List of extended plays, with selected chart positions
Title	EP details	Peak chart positions				
Title	EP details	US	US Folk	US Indie	US Rock	FRA
Noel (with Matt Morgan)	Released: December 2001; Label: Asthmatic Kitty; Formats: CD	—	—	—	—	—
Hark!	Released: December 2002; Label: Asthmatic Kitty; Formats: CD	—	—	—	—	—
Ding! Dong!	Released: December 2003; Label: Asthmatic Kitty; Formats: CD	—	—	—	—	—
An Album Club Exclusive	Released: August 2005; Label: Rough Trade; Formats: CD	—	—	—	—	—
Joy (with Bridgit DeCook)	Released: December 2005; Label: Asthmatic Kitty; Formats: CD	—	—	—	—	—
Peace	Released: June 2006; Label: Asthmatic Kitty; Formats: CD	—	—	—	—	—
Gloria! (with Aaron Dessner and Bryce Dessner)	Released: December 2006; Label: Asthmatic Kitty; Formats: CD	—	—	—	—	—
I Am Santa's Helper	Released: December 2007; Label: Asthmatic Kitty; Formats: CD	—	—	—	—	—
Infinity Voyage	Released: December 2008; Label: Asthmatic Kitty; Formats: CD	—	—	—	—	—
Let It Snow!	Released: December 2009; Label: Asthmatic Kitty; Formats: CD	—	—	—	—	—
All Delighted People	Released: August 23, 2010; Label: Asthmatic Kitty; Formats: CD · digital download · LP	27	3	5	7	32
Christmas Unicorn	Released: December 2010; Label: Asthmatic Kitty; Formats: CD	—	—	—	—	—
Hit & Run Vol. 1 (with Rosie Thomas)	Released: August 28, 2012; Label: Sing-a-Long; Formats: Digital download · LP	—	—	—	—	—
"—" denotes a title that did not chart, or was not released in that territory.

== Singles ==
=== As lead artist ===
List of singles as lead artist, with selected chart positions, showing year released and album name
Title	Year	Peak chart positions						Certifications	Album
Title	Year	US Rock	BEL (FL)	FRA	HUN	POR	SCO	Certifications	Album
"The Dress Looks Nice on You"	2004	—	—	—	—	—	—		Seven Swans
"I Went Dancing with My Sister"	2009	—	—	—	—	—	—		Seven Swans
"I Walked"	2010	—	—	—	—	—	—		The Age of Adz
"Too Much"	2010	— (Note: "Too Much" did not enter Billboard's Hot Rock Songs chart, but peaked at number 42 on the Rock Digital Song Sales component chart.)	—	—	—	—	—		The Age of Adz
"Christmas Unicorn"	2012	—	—	—	—	—	—		Silver & Gold
"Take the Time" (with Cat Martino)	2013	—	—	—	—	—	—		Non-album singles
"A Little Lost"	2014	—	—	—	—	—	—		Non-album singles
"No Shade in the Shadow of the Cross"	2015	—	—	—	—	—	—		Carrie & Lowell
"Should Have Known Better"	2015	—	—	—	—	—	—	RIAA: Gold	Carrie & Lowell
"Exploding Whale"	2015	—	—	—	—	—	—		Non-album single
"Blue Bucket of Gold"	2015	—	—	—	—	—	—		Carrie & Lowell
"Saturn" (with Bryce Dessner, Nico Muhly, and James McAlister)	2017	—	—	—	—	—	—		Planetarium
"Venus" (with Bryce Dessner, Nico Muhly, and James McAlister)	2017	—	—	—	—	—	—		Planetarium
"Mystery of Love"	2017	13	—	44	34	93	67	RIAA: Platinum; BPI: Silver; SNEP: Diamond; RMNZ: Gold	Call Me by Your Name
"Tonya Harding"	2017	—	— (Note: "Tonya Harding" did not enter Belgium's Ultratop 50 chart, but peaked at number 46 on the Flemish Ultratip chart.)	—	—	—	—		Non-album singles
"Lonely Man of Winter"	2018	—	—	—	—	—	—		Non-album singles
"Love Yourself"/"With My Whole Heart"	2019	44	—	—	—	—	—		Non-album singles
"Love Yourself"/"With My Whole Heart"	2019	—	—	—	—	—	—		Non-album singles
"America"/"My Rajneesh"	2020	—	—	—	—	—	—		Non-album singles
"Reach Out"/"Olympus"	2021	—	—	—	—	—	—		A Beginner's Mind
"Back to Oz"/"Fictional California"	2021	—	—	—	—	—	—		A Beginner's Mind
"Cimmerian Shade"/"You Give Death a Bad Name"	2021	—	—	—	—	—	—		A Beginner's Mind
"So You Are Tired"	2023	—	—	—	—	—	—		Javelin
"Will Anybody Ever Love Me?"	2023	—	—	—	—	—	—		Javelin
"A Running Start"	2023	—	—	—	—	—	—		Javelin
"Mystery of Love (Demo)"	2025	—	—	—	—	—	—		Carrie & Lowell (10th Anniversary Edition)
"Death With Dignity (Demo)"	2025	—	—	—	—	—	—		Carrie & Lowell (10th Anniversary Edition)
"—" denotes a title that did not chart, or was not released in that territory.

=== Promotional singles ===
List of promotional singles, showing year released, certifications and album name
Title	Year	Certifications	Album
"Put the Lights on the Tree"	2006		Songs for Christmas
"Carrie & Lowell"	2015		Carrie & Lowell
"Chicago"	2016	RIAA: Gold	Illinois
"Mercury" (with Bryce Dessner, Nico Muhly, and James McAlister)	2017		Planetarium
"Neptune" (with Bryce Dessner, Nico Muhly, and James McAlister)	2017		Planetarium
"Wallowa Lake Monster"	2017		The Greatest Gift
"John My Beloved"	2017		The Greatest Gift
"Blue Bucket of Gold" (Live)	2017		Carrie & Lowell Live

== Other charted and certified songs ==
List of other charted songs, with selected chart positions and certifications, showing year released and album name
Title	Year	Peak chart positions		Certifications	Album
Title	Year	US Rock	FRA	Certifications	Album
"Futile Devices"	2010	—	—	BPI: Silver	The Age of Adz
"Fourth of July"	2015	—	—	RIAA: Platinum; BPI: Gold; RMNZ: Gold	Carrie & Lowell
"Visions of Gideon"	2018	43	86	BPI: Silver; ZPAV: Gold	Call Me by Your Name

== Other appearances ==
List of non-single guest appearances, with other performing artists, showing year released and album name
Title	Year	Album
"All Delighted People"	2000	Eye of the Beholder
"Woman at the Well"	2000	8.21: A Blue Bunny Compilation
"Far Physician's Son"	2000	8.21: A Blue Bunny Compilation
"Damascus"	2001	Seen Unseen
"The First Full Moon"	2002	To Spirit Back the Mews
"God'll Ne'er Let You Down"	2002	To Spirit Back the Mews
"Bushwick Junkie"	2002	To Spirit Back the Mews
"I Can't Even Lift My Head"	2002	To Spirit Back the Mews
"Borderline"	2004	Hope Isn't a Word
"How Can the Stone Remain?"	2004	Metaphysics for Beginners
"The Lord God Bird"	2005	National Public Radio website
"What Goes On"	2005	This Bird Has Flown
"She Is"	2005	Dream Brother: The Songs of Tim and Jeff Buckley
"Opie's Funeral Song"	2006	Mews Too
"Variation on 'Commemorative Transfiguration and Communion at Magruder Park'"	2006	I Am the Resurrection
"Worried Shoes" (with Daniel Smith)	2006	I Killed the Monster
"Free Man in Paris"	2007	A Tribute to Joni Mitchell
"In the Words of the Governor"	2007	The Believer
"The One I Love"	2007	The New Frontier – Americana: The Next Generation
"Ring Them Bells"	2007	I'm Not There
"You Are the Blood"	2009	Dark Was the Night
"Sofia's Song"	2009	Asthmatic Kitty Records website
"A Little Lost"	2014	Master Mix: Red Hot + Arthur Russell
"Harsh Noise"	2016	One Night Stand #1

=== Guest appearances ===
Title	Year	Album
"Blood Pt. 2" (Buck 65 featuring Sufjan Stevens and Serengeti)	2009	Dark Was the Night
"Yr Not Alone" (Cat Martino featuring Sufjan Stevens)	2012	Yr Not Alone
"I Promise" (Cat Martino featuring Sufjan Stevens and Chris Powell of Man Man)	2013	Shaking Through Volume 3

== Music videos ==
List of music videos, with directors, showing year released
Title	Year	Director(s)
"Too Much"	2010	Deborah Johnson
"Year of the Tiger"	2014	Geoffrey Hoskinson
"Saturn"	2017	Deborah Johnson
"Mercury"	2017	Deborah Johnson
"Venus"	2017	Deborah Johnson
"Neptune"	2017	Deborah Johnson
"The Greatest Gift"	2017	Sufjan Stevens
"Mystery of Love"	2018	Luca Guadagnino (excerpts from Call Me by Your Name)
"Video Game"	2020	Nicole Ginelli
"Sugar"	2020	Ezra Hurwitz
"Tell Me You Love Me"	2021	Luca Guadagnino
