= Run Rabbit Run (album) =

Studio album by Osso String Quartet
- Released: October 6, 2009
- Genres: Avant-garde; classical
- Length: 53:53
- Label: Asthmatic Kitty

Professional ratings
Review scores
Source	Rating
Allmusic	3.5/5 stars
Pitchfork Media	7.7/10
Slant Magazine	4.0/5 stars

Run Rabbit Run is an album by the Osso String Quartet, which was released on October 6, 2009. It is a re-working of the 2001 instrumental album Enjoy Your Rabbit by Sufjan Stevens. The songs, originally performed with electronic instruments, were arranged by New York composers Michael Atkinson, Olivier Manchon, Maxim Moston, Nico Muhly, Rob Moose and Gabriel Kahane and performed by the Osso String Quartet. All of the original sounds—glitches, white noise, etc.—are reproduced by these string instruments. In contrast to Enjoy Your Rabbit, live musicians are used; live musicians weren't present on the original album—something Stevens thought it lacked.. Despite the name of the album being "Run Rabbit Run," a hare is depicted on the cover.

== Track listing ==
1. "Year of the Ox" (arr. Michael Atkinson) – 3:20
2. "Enjoy Your Rabbit" (arr. Atkinson) – 3:36
3. "Year of the Monkey" (arr. Atkinson) – 3:31
4. "Year of the Tiger" (arr. Rob Moose) – 3:24
5. "Year of the Dragon" (arr. Nico Muhly) – 3:22
6. "Year of the Snake" (arr. Olivier Manchon) – 5:04
7. "Year of the Horse" (arr. Moose) – 6:10
8. "Year of the Sheep" (arr. Maxim Moston) – 3:36
9. "Year of the Rat" (arr. Manchon) – 3:53
10. "Year of the Rooster" (arr. Gabriel Kahane) – 5:19
11. "Year of the Dog" (arr. Moose) – 4:44
12. "Year of the Boar" (arr. Atkinson) – 3:07
13. "Year of Our Lord" (arr. Atkinson) – 4:42
