= A Sun Came =

- Cover to the initial release

Studio album by Sufjan Stevens
- Released: June 13, 2000
- Recorded: 1998 ("Joy! Joy! Joy!" – 2001, "You Are the Rake" – 2004)
- Genres: Indie folk; lo-fi
- Length: 72:18 / 78:43 (reissue)
- Label: Asthmatic Kitty
- Producer: Sufjan Stevens

Sufjan Stevens chronology
A Sun Came (2000)	Enjoy Your Rabbit (2001)

2004 reissue cover

Professional ratings
Review scores
Source	Rating
AllMusic	3/5 stars
Pitchfork	6.0/10

A Sun Came (sometimes stylized as A Sun Came!) is the debut studio album by American singer-songwriter Sufjan Stevens, released in 2000 on Asthmatic Kitty. It was reissued four years later. Among Stevens' back catalog, A Sun Came is notable for being recorded on four-track.

== Thematic elements ==
As noted in AllMusic review of the album, the album explores many types of ethnic music from throughout the globe, ranging from Celtic, Indian, Middle Eastern, Moroccan, Far Eastern and American folk music. The record as a whole was dubbed indie folk, indie rock, Celtic rock, alternative rock, and lo-fi by different professional music critics.

Stevens himself has described the album's sound as incorporating "traditional pop music, medieval instrumentation with Middle Eastern inflections, tape loops, digital samples, literary vocals, manic percussion, woodwinds, sitar, amp distortion and Arabic chants."

Like many Stevens's albums that would follow, A Sun Came features a multitude of instruments ranging from banjo, sitar, oboe and xylophone. In total the album features Stevens playing fourteen instruments.

== Recording ==
Stevens originally recorded the bulk of the album in Holland, Michigan in 1998, with some post-editing performed at Hope College Recording Arts Center—the short track "Godzuki" was written by his siblings in 1981 and recorded by their stepfather Lowell Brams. "Joy! Joy! Joy!" was recorded for the 2001 re-release and "Rake (Greenpoint Version)"—a reworking of "Rake"—was recorded for the 2004 re-release.

== Track listing ==
All tracks are written by Sufjan Stevens.

No.	Title	Length
1.	"We Are What You Say"	5:20
2.	"A Winner Needs a Wand"	5:44
3.	"Rake"	2:48
4.	"Siamese Twins"	0:15
5.	"Demetrius"	6:01
6.	"Dumb I Sound"	5:48
7.	"Wordsworth's Ridge (for Fran Fike)"	4:54
8.	"Belly Button"	0:09
9.	"Rice Pudding"	2:24
10.	"A Loverless Bed (Without Remission)"	6:17
11.	"Godzuki"	0:36
12.	"Super Sexy Woman"	2:42
13.	"The Oracle Said Wander"	5:39
14.	"Happy Birthday"	2:45
15.	"Jason"	6:10
16.	"Kill"	4:26
17.	"Ya Leil"	5:38
18.	"A Sun Came"	2:11
19.	"Satan's Saxophones"	2:31
Total length:		72:18

Reissue bonus tracks
No.	Title	Length
20.	"Joy! Joy! Joy!"	3:23
21.	"Rake (Greenpoint Version)"	3:02
Total length:		78:43

== Personnel ==
- Sufjan Stevens – vocals, acoustic and electric guitars, recorders, wood flute, oboe, banjo, piano, sitar, alto saxophone, bass guitar, xylophone, drums, percussion, synthesizer, layout, art design, arrangement, mixing, production
- John Baker at Maja Audio Group – remastering (2004 edition)
- Stephen Halker – paintings
- Katrina Kerns – vocals on "Rake (Greenpoint version)"
- Jesse Koskey – drum beats on "Rice Pudding" and "A Loverless Bed (Without Remission)"
- Leah Michaelson – photography
- Matt Morgan – guitar solo on "Demetrius" and "The Oracle Said Wander"
- Megan Smith – vocals on "Rake (Greenpoint version)"
- Shannon Stephens – vocals on "A Winner Needs a Wand"
- Djohariah Stevens – performance on "Godzuki"
- Marzuki Stevens – guitar on "A Loverless Bed (Without Remission)", percussion on "Super Sexy Woman", tenor saxophone on "Satan's Saxophones", and performance on "Godzuki"
- Ghadeer Yasser – vocals on "Demetrius" and "Ya Leil"
