= Tahquamenon Falls =

Series of waterfalls on the Tahquamenon River in Michigan, United States

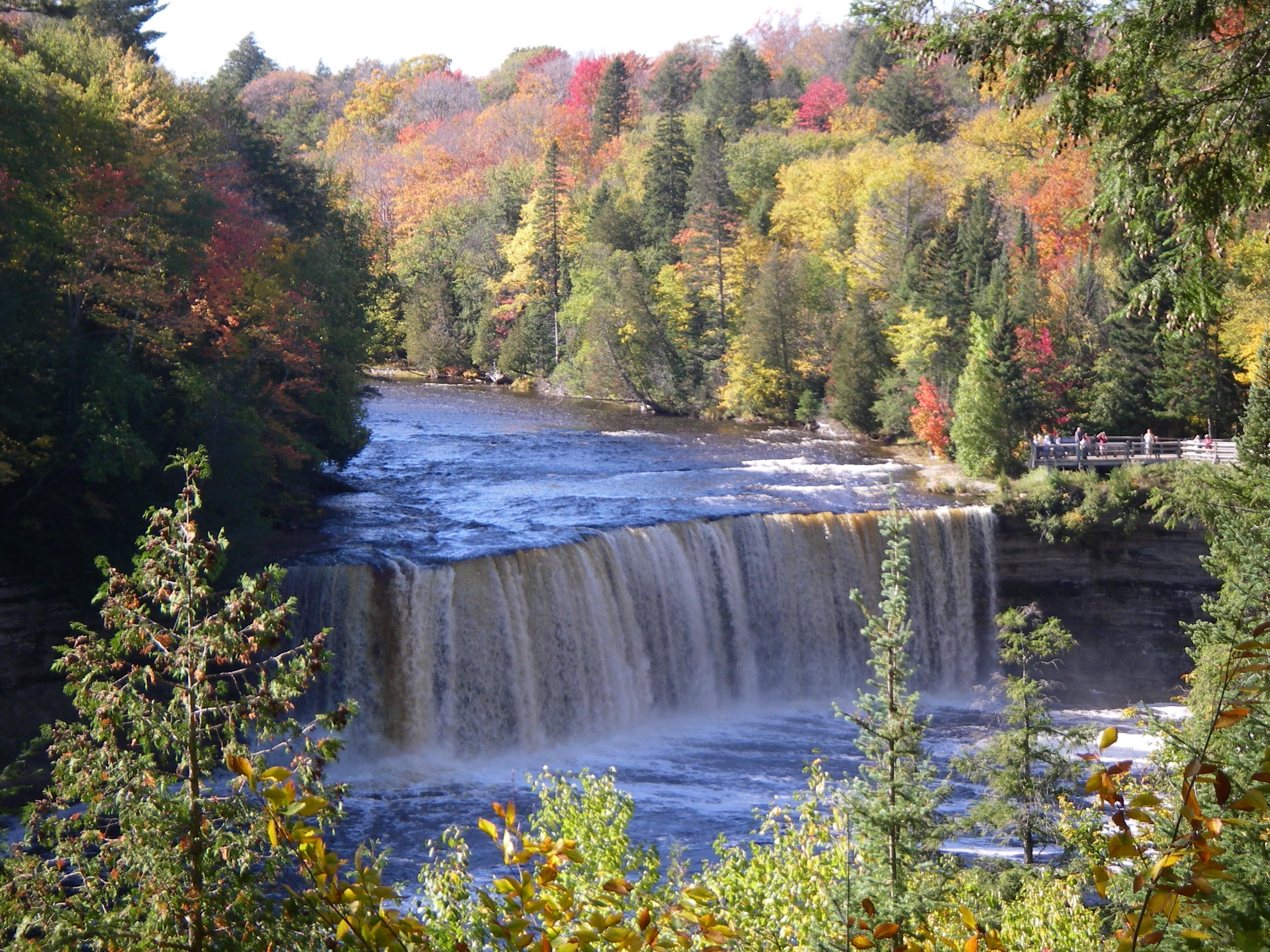
- The Upper Tahquamenon Falls

- Location within Michigan
- Location: Tahquamenon Falls State Park, Luce County, Michigan
- Coordinates: 46°34′26.4″N 85°15′21.6″W
- Type: Block
- Total height: 48 feet (15 m)
- Number of drops: 77
- Watercourse: Tahquamenon River
- Average flow rate: 7,000 gallons per second (average annual mean)

The Tahquamenon Falls (/təˈkwɑːmənɒn, -nən/ tə-KWAH-mə-non, -nən) are a series of waterfalls on the Tahquamenon River, shortly before it empties into Lake Superior, in the northeastern Upper Peninsula of Michigan. They are the largest waterfalls in Michigan and one of the largest in the eastern half of North America. The water is noticeably brown in color from the tannins leached from the cedar swamps which the river drains, leading to the nickname "Root Beer Falls". The falls are within Tahquamenon Falls State Park, between the towns of Newberry and Paradise, and are a popular tourist destination during all seasons.

== Geography ==
The falls are divided into the Upper and Lower Falls. The Upper Falls consist of a single drop of approximately 48 feet (15 m), where the river is more than 200 feet (60 m) across. During the late spring runoff, the river drains as much as 50,000 US gallons (190,000 L) of water per second, making the Upper Falls the third most voluminous waterfall east of the Mississippi River, after Niagara Falls and Cohoes Falls. The Lower Falls is located about 4 miles (6.4 km) downstream, and consist of five smaller falls cascading around an island. The island can be reached by rowboat from the basin below the Lower Falls, or by a foot bridge constructed in 2022. The Upper Falls are located at 46°34′29″N 85°15′23″W, and the Lower Falls are at 46°36′12″N 85°12′25″W.

== History ==
The falls take their name from the river, which appears to come from Tahquamenon Island in Whitefish Bay, near the mouth of the river; the first written record of the name identifies the island as "Outakouaminan" in a 1671 French map. The Tahquamenon River is mentioned by name in Longfellow's 1855 epic poem The Song of Hiawatha, as the protagonist builds a birch-bark canoe "In the solitary forest, By the rushing Taquamenaw". A song by Sufjan Stevens on his album Michigan is titled after Tahquamenon Falls.

== Photo gallery ==
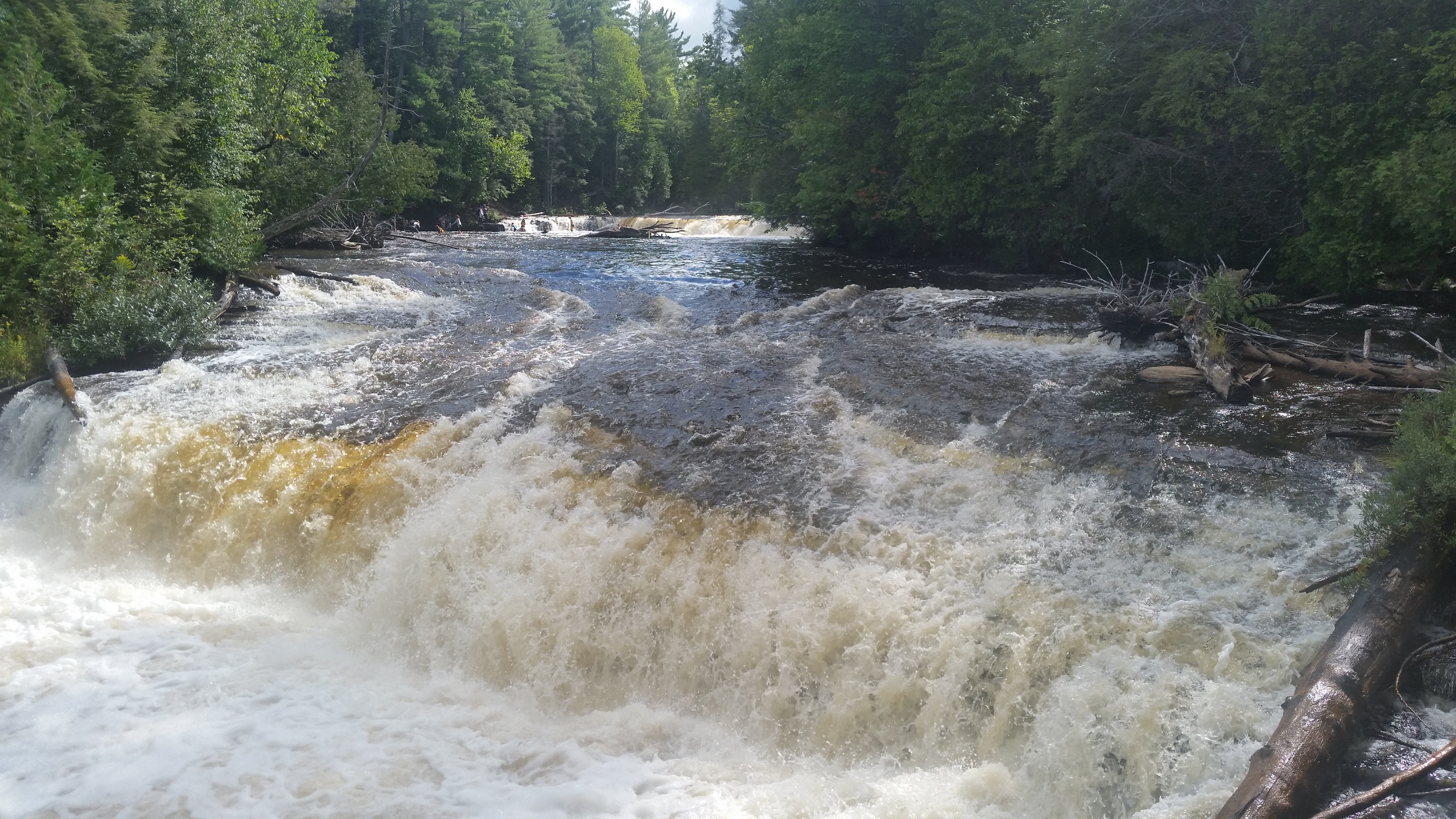
Lower Falls

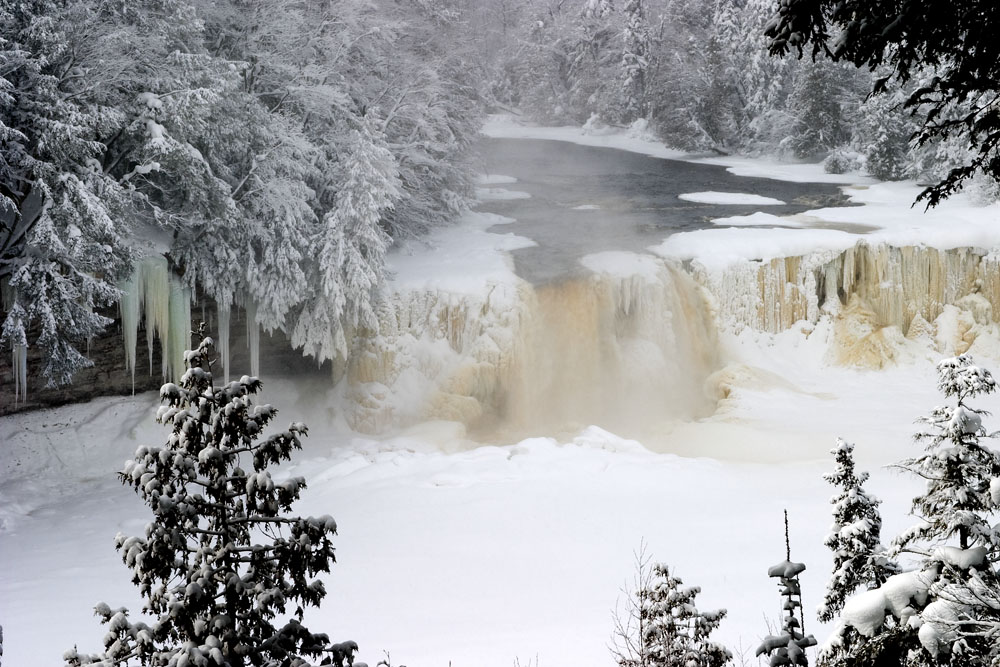
Upper Falls in Winter 2004

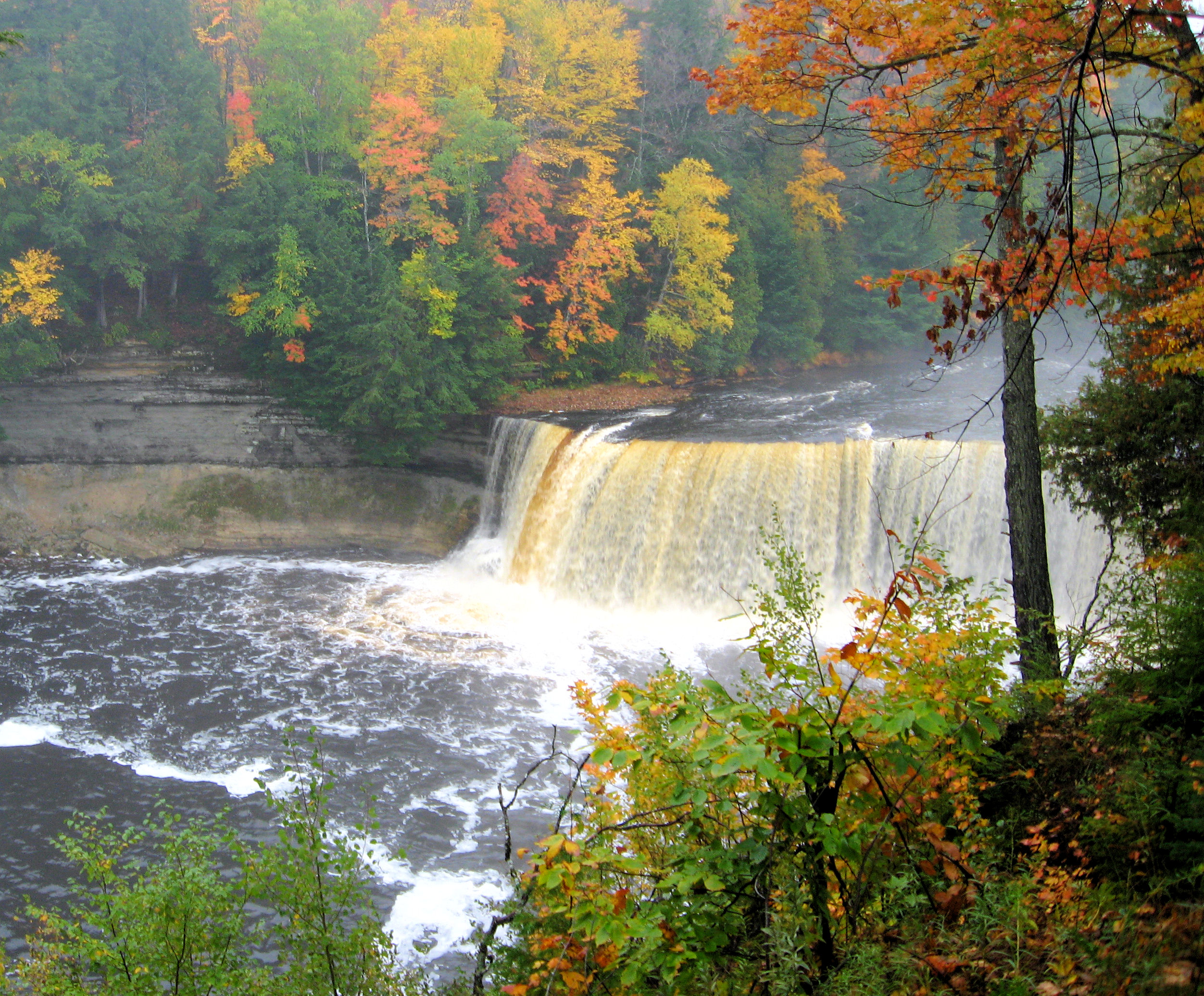
During Autumn

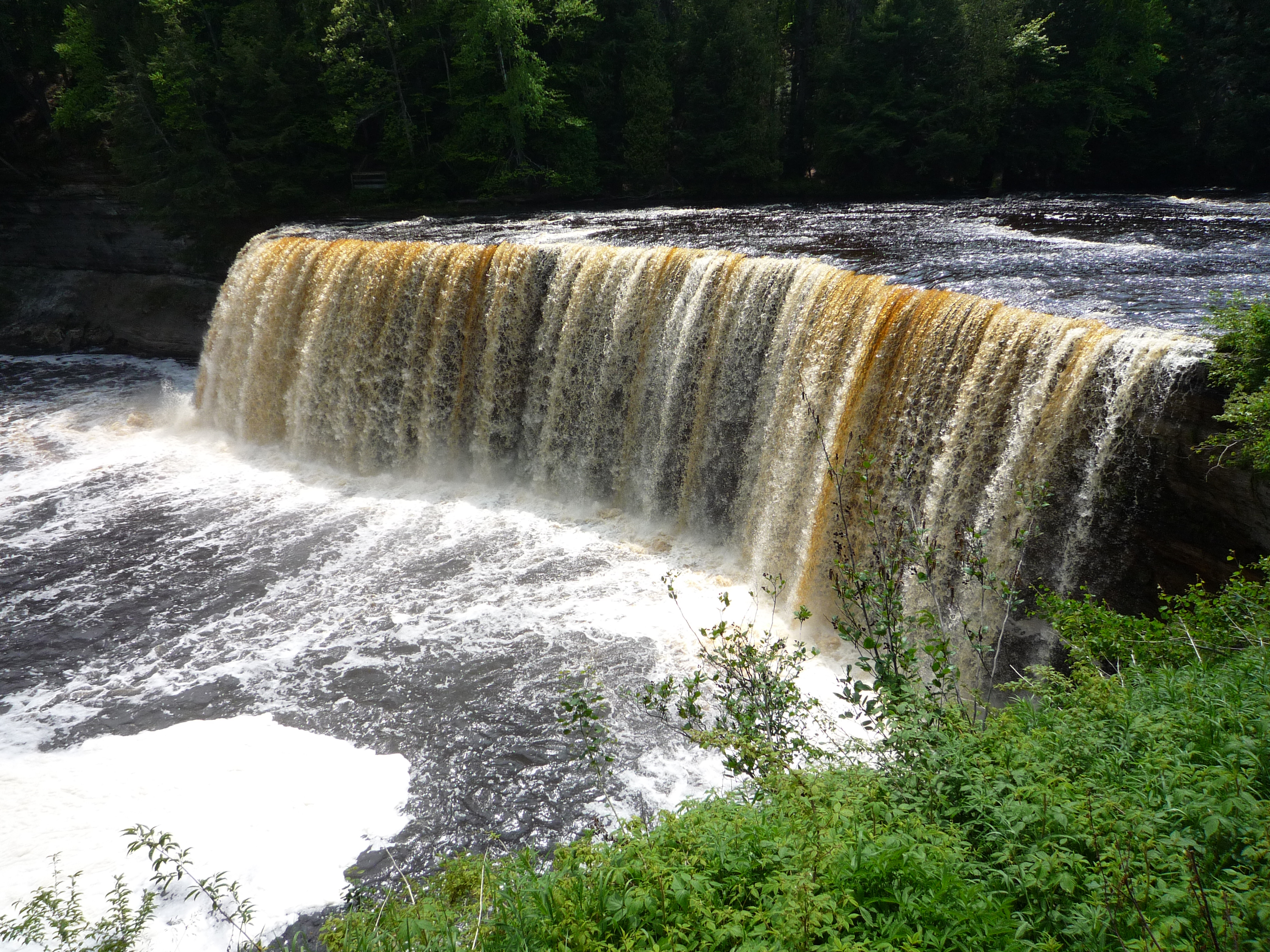
The Upper Falls

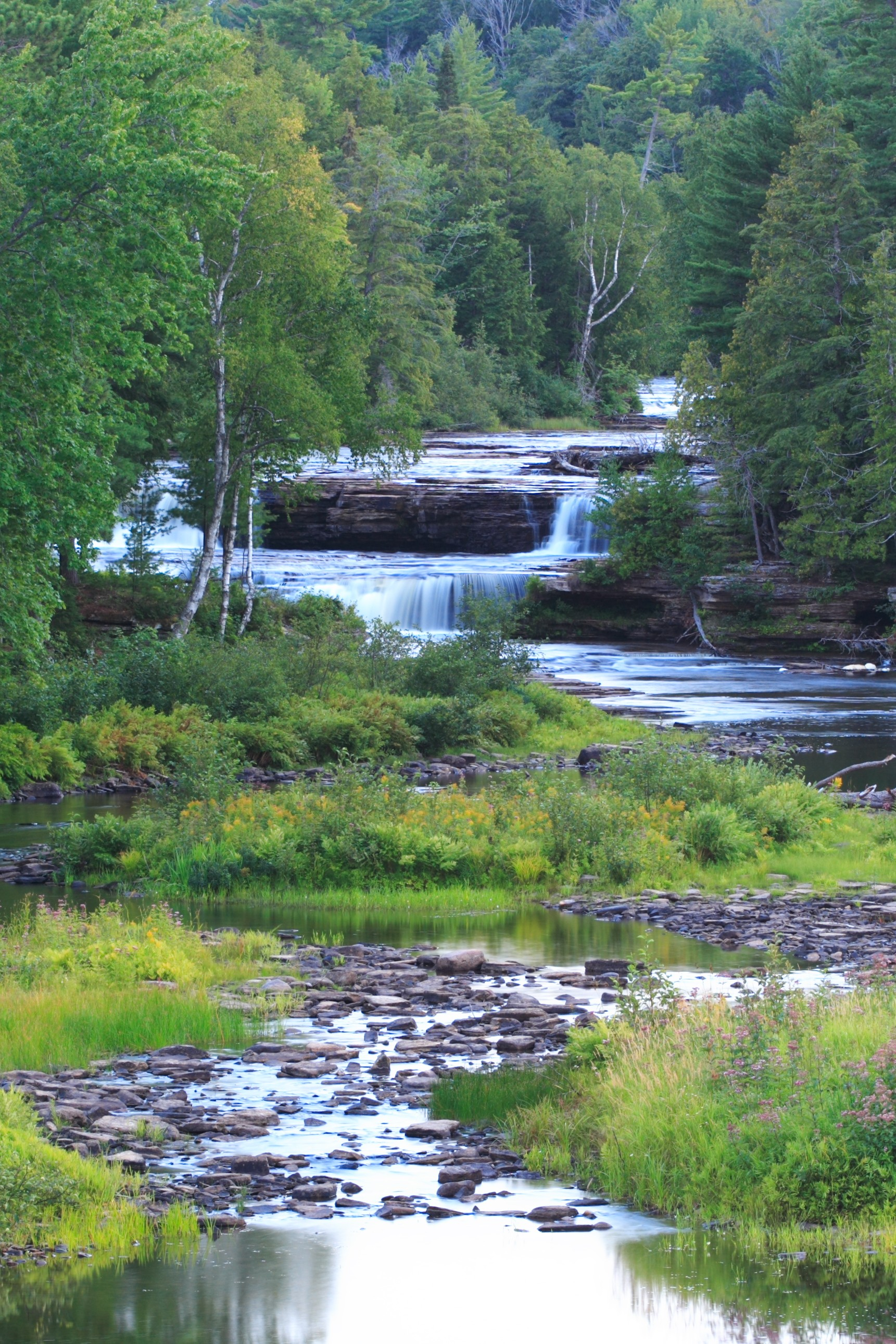
Tahquamenon Lower Falls

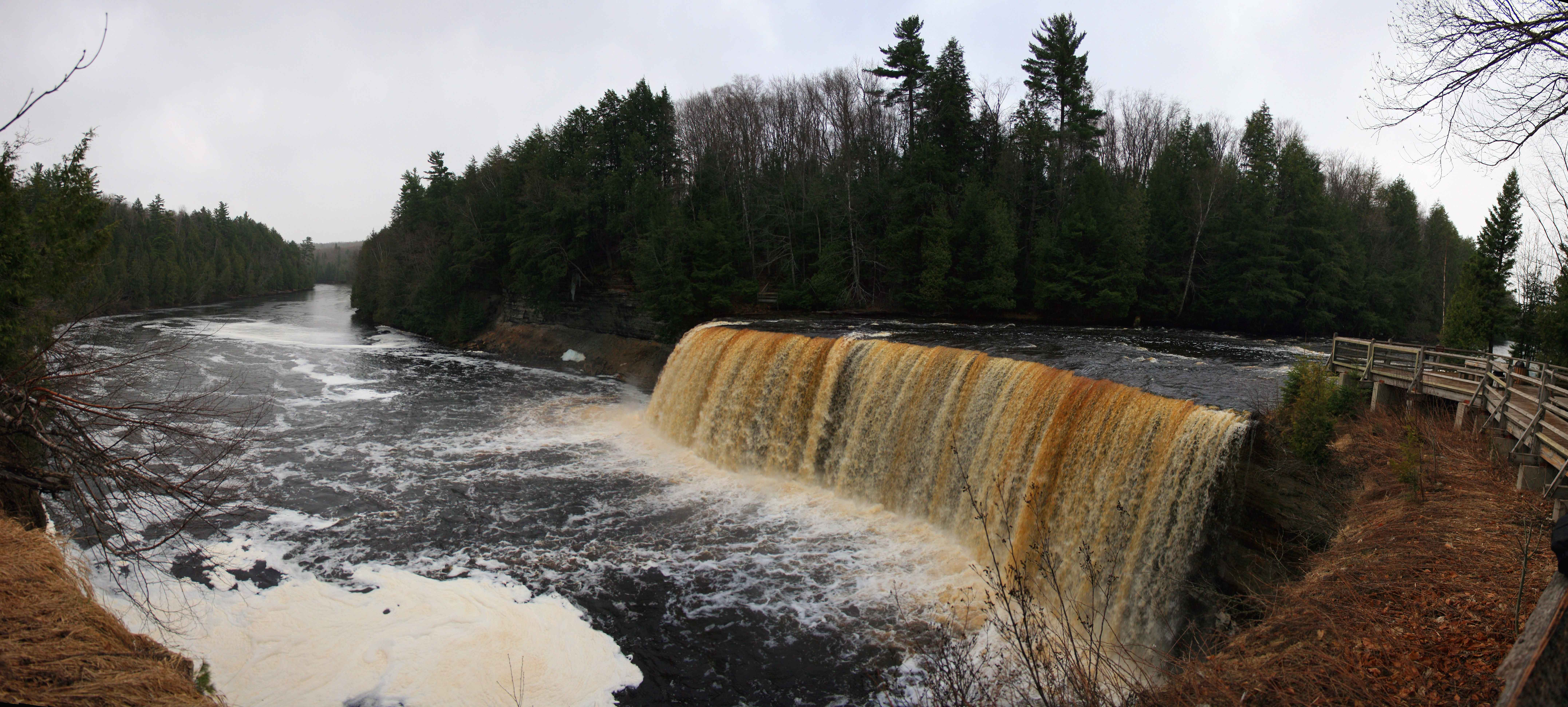
Panoramic

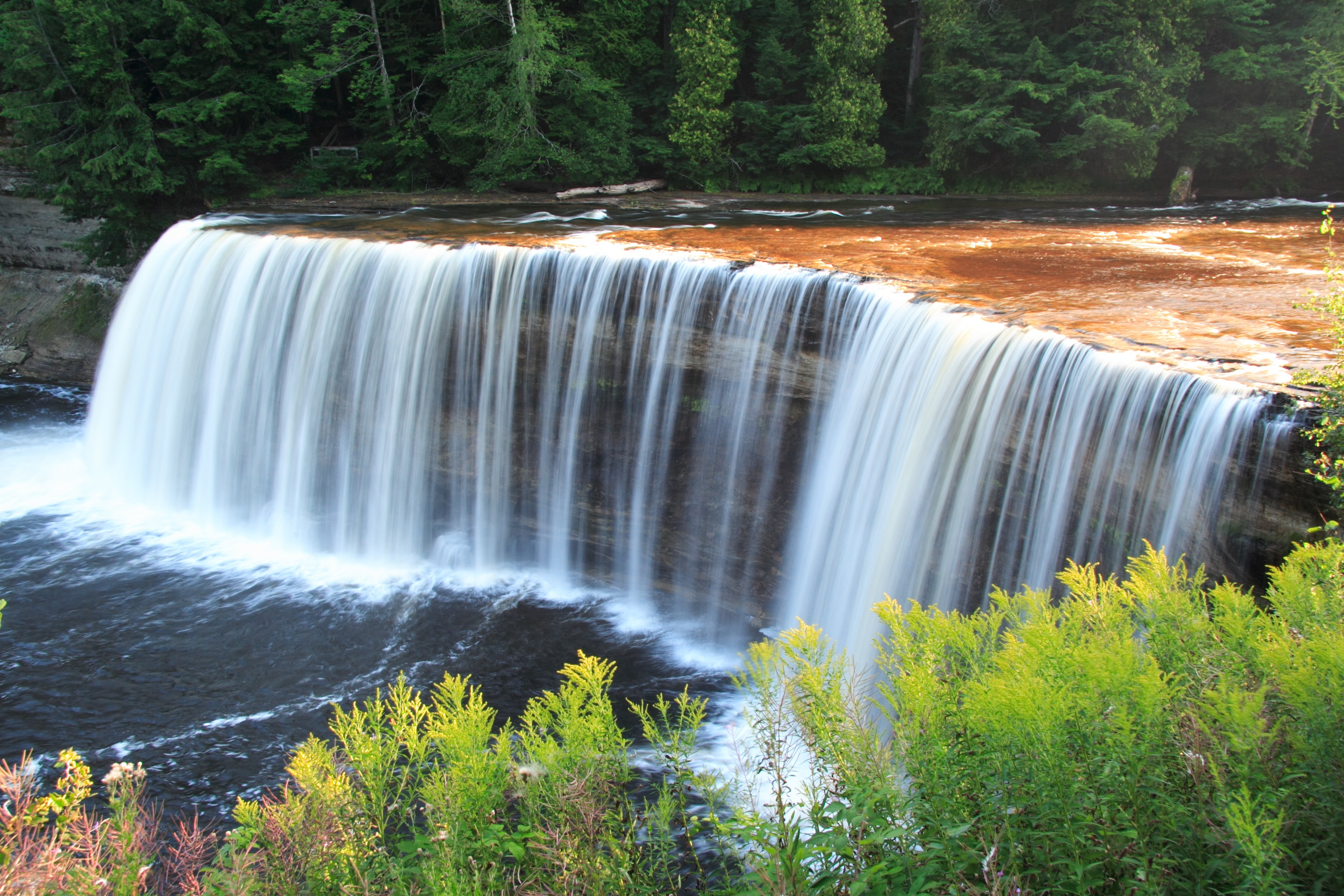
Upper Tahquamenon Falls

== See also ==
- List of waterfalls
