= Lord God Bird =

Lord God bird may refer to one of two similar-looking large woodpeckers of North America:

- The ivory-billed woodpecker, a rare bird believed to be critically endangered or extinct
- The pileated woodpecker, a common bird of North America

Lord God Bird may also refer to:

- "Lord God Bird", a poem by Colin Cheney
- ”The Lord God Bird”, a 2020 song by Coach Kit
- "The Lord God Bird", 2005 song by Sufjan Stevens
- The Lord God Bird, a 2007 documentary by filmmaker Robert Nixon
