= Reflections (Timo Andres, Conor Hanick, and Sufjan Stevens album) =

Soundtrack album by Timo Andres, Conor Hanick, and Sufjan Stevens
- Released: May 19, 2023
- Length: 30:31
- Label: Asthmatic Kitty

Timo Andres chronology
The Decalogue (2019)	Reflections (2023)

Sufjan Stevens chronology
A Beginner's Mind (2021)	Reflections (2023)	Javelin (2023)

Reflections is a 2023 ballet soundtrack by Timo Andres, Conor Hanick, and Sufjan Stevens.

== Reception ==
The Spill Magazine's Joseph Mastel rated this release 3.5 out of 5, writing that it "manages to be both bold and creative and often shows the impressive range that the piano can have", but also criticizing that "it is not as mesmerizing or spectacular as some of Stevens’ older albums". A brief overview of the best events and media of the week from The Guardian included this album as one of four recommended to readers. A brief review of new music for The New Zealand Herald by Peter Baker includes the recommendation that the "performances are vibrant and beguiling as they weave impressively through these technically challenging compositions". In NPR's All Songs Considered, the hosts chose this album as one of the best of the week. Writing for PopMatters, Alex Brent rated this release a 5 out of 10, calling it "wonderfully performed" music that does not break new ground and cannot stand apart from its original context of the ballet. BBC Music's Freya Parr rated this 4 out of 5 stars, writing that "both pianists passing tightly woven melodies between one another at a sharpish tempo" that makes for "a vibrant, highly energetic listen".

== Track listing ==
1. "Ekstasis" – 3:04
2. "Revanche" – 5:20
3. "Euphoros" – 3:15
4. "Mnemosyne" – 3:28
5. "Rodinia" – 5:52
6. "Reflexion" – 2:58
7. "And I Shall Come to You Like a Stormtrooper in Drag Serving Imperial Realness" – 6:34

== Personnel ==
- Timo Andres – piano
- Teng Chen – editing
- Conor Hanick – piano
- Edwin Huet – assistant engineering
- Charles Mueller – assistant engineering
- Jessica Slaven – artwork
- Sufjan Stevens – layout, design
- Ryan Streber – engineering, editing, mixing, and mastering

== Chart performance ==
Reflections debuted at the top spot of the British Specialist Classical Albums Chart.

== See also ==
- List of 2023 albums
