= Javelin (album) =

Studio album by Sufjan Stevens
- Released: October 6, 2023
- Genre: Indie folk
- Length: 41:59
- Label: Asthmatic Kitty
- Producer: Sufjan Stevens

Sufjan Stevens chronology
Reflections (2023)	Javelin (2023)	Worst Christmas Ever! (2026)

Singles from Javelin
- 1. "So You Are Tired" Released: August 14, 2023; 2. "Will Anybody Ever Love Me?" Released: September 13, 2023; 3. "A Running Start" Released: October 3, 2023

Javelin is the tenth studio album by American musician Sufjan Stevens, released on October 6, 2023, through Asthmatic Kitty. Preceded by the singles "So You Are Tired", "Will Anybody Ever Love Me?", and "A Running Start", the album received widespread critical acclaim on release.

== Background and recording ==
Stevens created the record mostly by himself in his home studio with contributions by several friends, including harmonies provided by Adrienne Maree Brown, Hannah Cohen, Pauline Delassus, Megan Lui, and Nedelle Torrisi, among others. Additionally, The National guitarist Bryce Dessner played acoustic and electric guitar on the record. According to a press release, the album sees the artist returning to "full singer-songwriter mode" for the first time since his 2015 studio album Carrie & Lowell. It further states that Javelin might feel like a "big team" production at times but assures the listener that every track is a product of Stevens "at home", "building by himself" and creating a sentiment of "'70s Los Angeles studio opulence". The album is dedicated to his late partner, Evans Richardson.

The lead single "So You Are Tired", a "major shift back to the scaled-down, acoustic instrumentation" of Carrie & Lowell, was released on August 14, 2023. While Sufjan penned nine of the tracks on his own, the project also features a cover of Neil Young's "There's a World" from his 1972 album Harvest. The album release was accompanied by a 48-page book of "imaginative visual" art and 10 short essays tied to the songs.

On Javelin's release day, Stevens posted on Instagram that "this album is dedicated to the light of my life, my beloved partner and best friend Evans Richardson, who passed away in April [2023]".

== Critical reception ==
Professional ratings
Aggregate scores
Source	Rating
AnyDecentMusic?	8.6/10
Metacritic	87/100
Review scores
Source	Rating
AllMusic	4/5 stars
DIY	4.5/5 stars
The Guardian	4/5 stars
The Line of Best Fit	10/10
Mojo	4/5 stars
NME	4/5 stars
Pitchfork	8.6/10
The Skinny	4/5 stars
Slant Magazine	4/5 stars
Uncut	8/10

Javelin received a score of 87 out of 100 on review aggregator Metacritic based on 22 critics' reviews, indicating "universal acclaim". Mojo's James McNair felt that Stevens is "still adept at spectacular, if somewhat opaque intimacy" and that "he enchants on 'My Red Little Fox', with its baroque recorders", while Uncut stated that "Javelin sounds like a proper Sufjan Stevens album, picking up the lyrical and sonic threads of Carrie & Lowell and 2010's The Age of Adz". The Skinny's Lucy Fitzgerald concluded that the album "gracefully distill[s] a profusion of self-loathing", calling it "a heartsick high. No one yearns like Sufjan Stevens".

Dana Poland of Slant Magazine wrote that "as always, expressions of spiritual and romantic devotion are skillfully intertwined in Stevens's lyrics" as he "bridg[es] the universal and the personal. Javelin doesn't just feel like a return to form—it feels resurgent". Pitchfork awarded the album their "Best New Music" distinction, with Sam Sodomsky writing that "the songwriting feels as raw and direct as ever" as Stevens "seems intent on understanding and being understood, with the purpose of exposing the common thread between his pet subjects: raising the endless questions that lead us to seek meaning in one another, and rejoicing in the euphoria of sometimes finding it".

In his review for AllMusic, Mark Deming concluded that "Javelin is an album about the need to be loved, agape and philia, and Stevens shows that he can write about both without trivializing or minimizing the importance of either. That's a commendable achievement in any creative medium, and the fact that he's done so while creating some of the best music of his life makes this essential listening." NME's Hannah Mylrea called it "a return to 'full singer-songwriter' Stevens, in a way, but by bringing together sonics from throughout his career and coupling it with frank and intimate lyricism, the gorgeous Javelin feels like a fresh take from the cult hero." Reviewing the album for The Guardian, Alexis Petridis described it as "a holistic album, one that flows rather than fractures" and claimed it, "remarkable, too... carrying the listener along with it as it goes".

DIY's Ben Tipple wrote that "even on the occasion when the record veers dangerously close to twee (see the nursery rhyme-adjacent 'My Little Red Fox'), it still presents as a delicate insight back to the life of its creator" and it "takes a confident stride back into personal territory and certainly gives [Carrie & Lowell] a run for its money". Matthew Kim of The Line of Best Fit found that "Stevens goes back to what he does best – slightly electronic folk music paired with poetic lyricism – and he crafts yet another masterpiece, distinct from his previous catalogue but just as affecting".

In 2024, Rolling Stone placed the cover art 39th on its list of "The 50 Worst Album Covers of All Time".

Year-end lists
Publication	Accolade	Rank	Ref.
British GQ	Best Albums of 2023	—N/a	
Exclaim!	50 Best Albums of 2023	3	
Paste	50 Best Albums of 2023	2	
Pitchfork	50 Best Albums of 2023	6	
Rolling Stone	100 Best Albums of 2023	15	

== Commercial performance ==
Javelin sold 4,335 units in the first week in UK.

== Track listing ==
All tracks are written by Sufjan Stevens; except "There's a World", written by Neil Young.

Javelin track listing
No.	Title	Length
1.	"Goodbye Evergreen"	3:35
2.	"A Running Start"	4:21
3.	"Will Anybody Ever Love Me?"	4:09
4.	"Everything That Rises"	4:59
5.	"Genuflecting Ghost"	3:32
6.	"My Red Little Fox"	3:42
7.	"So You Are Tired"	4:49
8.	"Javelin (To Have and to Hold)"	1:52
9.	"Shit Talk"	8:31
10.	"There's a World"	2:29
Total length:		41:59

Rough Trade bonus disc: "5 Unreleased Songs"
No.	Title	Length
1.	"Malthusian Mistress"	1:34
2.	"Is It My Fault?"	2:21
3.	"Fireproof"	2:03
4.	"Old Man of the Lake"	2:55
5.	"The Kiss of Niobe"	3:14
Total length:		12:06

== Personnel ==
- Sufjan Stevens – vocals, drums, guitar, keyboards, piano, production, mixing, recording
- Heba Kadry – mastering
- Hannah Cohen – vocals (tracks 1–4, 6–8, 10)
- Megan Lui – vocals (tracks 1–4, 6–8, 10)
- Nedelle Torrisi – vocals (track 2)
- Adrienne Maree Brown – vocals (tracks 3–8)
- Bryce Dessner – guitar (9)
- Pauline De Lassus – vocals (9)

== Charts ==
Chart performance for Javelin
Chart (2023)	Peak position
Australian Albums (ARIA)	46
Austrian Albums (Ö3 Austria)	33
Belgian Albums (Ultratop Flanders)	15
Belgian Albums (Ultratop Wallonia)	29
Dutch Albums (Album Top 100)	5
French Albums (SNEP)	41
German Albums (Offizielle Top 100)	15
Irish Albums (Official Charts)	13
Japanese Hot Albums (Billboard Japan)	86
New Zealand Albums (RMNZ)	14
Portuguese Albums (AFP)	13
Scottish Albums (Official Charts)	3
Spanish Albums (Promusicae)	36
Swiss Albums (Schweizer Hitparade)	15
UK Albums (Official Charts)	7
UK Independent Albums (Official Charts)	2
US Billboard 200	30
US Americana/Folk Albums (Billboard)	4
US Independent Albums (Billboard)	7
US Top Alternative Albums (Billboard)	4
US Top Rock Albums (Billboard)	4
