= The Decalogue (soundtrack) =

Soundtrack album by Timo Andres and Sufjan Stevens
- Released: October 18, 2019
- Genre: Classical
- Length: 27:18
- Label: Asthmatic Kitty

Sufjan Stevens chronology
The Greatest Gift (2017)	The Decalogue (2019)	Aporia (2020)

The Decalogue is a 2017 soundtrack album to the Justin Peck ballet of the same name, by Timo Andres and Sufjan Stevens. The album was released by Asthmatic Kitty to mixed reviews. The ballet debuted in 2017 with the New York City Ballet.

== Reception ==
The editorial staff of AllMusic gave the album three out of five stars, with reviewer Mark Deming writing, "[it] sometimes feels rather incomplete, especially presented in such elemental form, but committed fans will want to give it a listen, and it's good to hear this unique talent willing to push his own stylistic boundaries". Noah Yoo of Pitchfork gave it a 6.5 out of 10, summing up his review, "The Decalogue is a Stevens curio like Enjoy Your Rabbit and The BQE before it: riveting to diehards, an agreeable footnote for anyone else".

== Track listing ==
1. "I" – 3:36
2. "II" – 1:40
3. "III" – 1:29
4. "IV" – 3:04
5. "V" – 2:37
6. "VI" – 2:55
7. "VII" – 3:01
8. "VIII" – 3:01
9. "IX" – 2:13
10. "X" – 3:42

== Personnel ==
- Timo Andres – piano
- Sufjan Stevens – composition
