= Convocations (album) =

Studio album by Sufjan Stevens
- Released: May 6, 2021
- Genres: Ambient; electronic; space
- Length: 150:05
- Label: Asthmatic Kitty
- Producer: Sufjan Stevens

Sufjan Stevens chronology
The Ascension (2020)	Convocations (2021)	A Beginner's Mind (2021)

Singles from Convocations
- 1. "Meditation V" Released: April 2, 2021; 2. "Lamentation II" Released: April 12, 2021; 3. "Revelation II" Released: April 19, 2021; 4. "Celebration VIII" Released: April 26, 2021; 5. "Incantation VIII" Released: May 3, 2021

Convocations is the ninth studio album by American musician Sufjan Stevens, released through Asthmatic Kitty on May 6, 2021. Recorded during the COVID-19 pandemic following the death of Stevens's father, the album was released in five volumes, with a combined total of 49 instrumental songs.

== Background and recording ==
Convocations, as described by Stevens' label, Asthmatic Kitty, is "a 49-track reflection on a year of anxiety, uncertainty, isolation, and loss." The album's five volumes each represent one of the five stages of grief, motivated by the death of Stevens' biological father on September 27, 2020, just two days after the release of his previous studio album, The Ascension.

Regarding his decision to record a purely instrumental album, Stevens noted: "I think this past year I've just felt so overwhelmed with the content of the world, the pandemic and all the extreme sort of political movements and racial inequity. And then the terror of this invisible plague. All of that is just like weighing bearing down on all of us every day. I felt like I had almost been rendered speechless, in a way. [...] I wanted to create music that didn't have a narrative and didn't have verbal content."

== Release ==
The album's first single, "Meditation V", was released on April 6, and the first of five volumes, Meditations, was released on April 8, 2021. Lamentations was released on April 15. Revelations was released on April 22. Celebrations was released on April 29, and Incantations was released on May 6, 2021.

Regarding the album's springtime release, Stevens noted: "I recorded most of this in the dead of winter and now it's coming out in the spring. And I think that really, it's a serendipity in a way, that it allows for us to receive this music with hope, you know, for the future. And that's I think that's something that we all deserve and need more than ever right now."

Each of the volumes and tracks of Convocations are accompanied by a generative video art piece created by Mexican artist Melissa Fuentes.

== Composition ==
Convocations is an ambient, electronic, and space music album that contains elements of progressive electronic, shoegaze, drone, and space jazz.

== Track listing ==
All tracks are written by Sufjan Stevens.

Meditations
No.	Title	Length
1.	"Meditation I"	3:40
2.	"Meditation II"	2:27
3.	"Meditation III"	4:04
4.	"Meditation IV"	2:10
5.	"Meditation V"	2:11
6.	"Meditation VI"	2:16
7.	"Meditation VII"	2:34
8.	"Meditation VIII"	1:48
9.	"Meditation IX"	2:12
10.	"Meditation X"	3:40
Total length:		27:02

Lamentations
No.	Title	Length
1.	"Lamentation I"	3:49
2.	"Lamentation II"	2:25
3.	"Lamentation III"	3:18
4.	"Lamentation IV"	1:59
5.	"Lamentation V"	4:11
6.	"Lamentation VI"	4:43
7.	"Lamentation VII"	1:52
8.	"Lamentation VIII"	3:35
9.	"Lamentation IX"	3:29
10.	"Lamentation X"	1:57
Total length:		31:18

Revelations
No.	Title	Length
1.	"Revelation I"	3:21
2.	"Revelation II"	2:54
3.	"Revelation III"	2:01
4.	"Revelation IV"	4:10
5.	"Revelation V"	2:52
6.	"Revelation VI"	3:34
7.	"Revelation VII"	4:04
8.	"Revelation VIII"	2:52
9.	"Revelation IX"	4:39
10.	"Revelation X"	4:18
Total length:		34:45

Celebrations
No.	Title	Length
1.	"Celebration I"	2:20
2.	"Celebration II"	5:56
3.	"Celebration III"	3:10
4.	"Celebration IV"	3:23
5.	"Celebration V"	2:59
6.	"Celebration VI"	4:02
7.	"Celebration VII"	3:41
8.	"Celebration VIII"	3:26
9.	"Celebration IX"	1:36
10.	"Celebration X"	4:10
Total length:		34:43

Incantations
No.	Title	Length
1.	"Incantation I"	2:17
2.	"Incantation II"	1:59
3.	"Incantation III"	1:37
4.	"Incantation IV"	2:00
5.	"Incantation V"	3:15
6.	"Incantation VI"	1:50
7.	"Incantation VII"	1:54
8.	"Incantation VIII"	2:56
9.	"Incantation IX"	4:29
Total length:		22:17

== Charts ==
Chart performance for Convocations
Chart (2021)	Peak position
US Current Album Sales (Billboard)	59
US New Age Albums (Billboard)	3
