= The Greatest Gift (mixtape) =

Mixtape by Sufjan Stevens
- Released: November 24, 2017
- Length: 48:24
- Label: Asthmatic Kitty
- Producer: Sufjan Stevens

Sufjan Stevens chronology
Planetarium (2017)	The Greatest Gift (2017)	The Decalogue (2019)

The Greatest Gift (styled The Greatest Gift Mixtape – Outtakes, Remixes & Demos from Carrie & Lowell) is a mixtape by Sufjan Stevens consisting of outtakes and unreleased tracks from Stevens' 2015 release, Carrie & Lowell.

== Critical reception ==
The mixtape received mostly positive reviews upon release. At Metacritic, which assigns a normalized rating out of 100 to reviews from music critics, the album has received an average score of 71, indicating "generally favorable reviews", based on 15 reviews. Pitchfork gave the album a score of 7.2 out of 10, stating "Though too scattered to stand alone, the various demos and remixes culled from Carrie & Lowell add new context and dimension to Sufjan Stevens’ masterful album."

Professional ratings
Aggregate scores
Source	Rating
Metacritic	71/100
Review scores
Source	Rating
Clash	8/10
Drowned in Sound	7/10 stars
The Guardian	3/5
The Independent	4/5 stars
London Evening Standard	4/5
The Observer	3/5 stars
Paste	7.6/10 stars
Pitchfork	7.2/10 stars
Under the Radar	7/10 stars

== Track listing ==
All songs written by Sufjan Stevens.

1. "Wallowa Lake Monster" – 6:52
2. "Drawn to the Blood" (Sufjan Stevens Remix) – 5:28
3. "Death with Dignity" (Helado Negro Remix) – 4:08
4. "John My Beloved" (iPhone Demo) – 4:17
5. "Drawn to the Blood" (Fingerpicking Remix) – 2:01
6. "The Greatest Gift" – 1:51
7. "Exploding Whale" (Doveman Remix) – 5:26
8. "All of Me Wants All of You" (Helado Negro Remix) – 3:24
9. "Fourth of July" (900X Remix) – 6:48
10. "The Hidden River of My Life" – 4:04
11. "City of Roses" – 2:14
12. "Carrie & Lowell" (iPhone Demo) – 1:52 – Digital exclusive / Hidden track on CD

== Charts ==
Chart (2017)	Peak position
New Zealand Heatseeker Albums (RMNZ)	10
US Americana/Folk Albums (Billboard)	10
US Independent Albums (Billboard)	23
