= Sufjan Stevens =

American musician (born 1975)

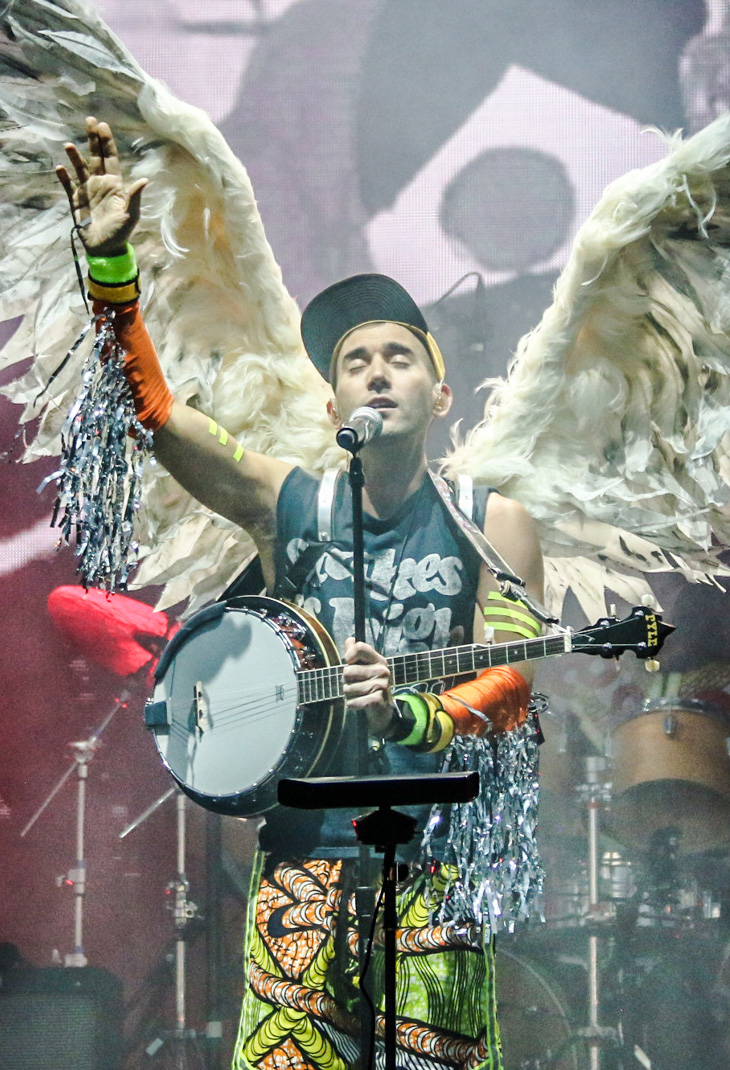
- Stevens performing at Pitchfork Music Festival in July 2016

Background information
- Born: July 1, 1975 (age 51); Detroit, Michigan, U.S.
- Genres: Indie folk; chamber pop; folktronica; indie rock; electronica
- Occupations: Musician; singer; songwriter
- Instruments: Vocals; guitar; keyboards; bass; drums; banjo; guitalin; oboe; English horn
- Works: Sufjan Stevens discography
- Years active: 1995–present
- Labels: Asthmatic Kitty; Sounds Familyre; Orchard
- Website: music.sufjan.com

Sufjan Stevens (/ˈsuːfjɑːn/ SOOF-yahn; born July 1, 1975) is an American singer, songwriter, and multi-instrumentalist. He has released ten solo studio albums and multiple collaborative albums with other artists. Stevens has received Grammy and Academy Award nominations.

His debut album, A Sun Came, was released in 2000 on the Asthmatic Kitty label, which he co-founded with his stepfather. He received wide recognition for his 2005 album Illinois, which hit number one on the Billboard Top Heatseekers chart, and for the single "Chicago" from that album. Stevens later contributed to the soundtrack of the 2017 film Call Me by Your Name. He received an Academy Award nomination for Best Original Song and a Grammy nomination for Best Song Written for Visual Media for the soundtrack's lead single, "Mystery of Love".

Stevens has released albums of varying styles, from the electronica of The Age of Adz and the lo-fi folk of Seven Swans to the symphonic instrumentation of Illinois and Yuletide-themed Songs for Christmas. He employs various instruments, often playing many of them himself on the same recording. Stevens' music is also known for exploring various themes, particularly religion and spirituality. Stevens' tenth studio album, Javelin, was released in October 2023.

== Early life, family and education ==
Stevens was born in Detroit and lived there until the age of nine, when his family moved to Alanson, Michigan, in the state's northern Lower Peninsula. He was raised by his father, Rasjid, and his stepmother, Pat, only occasionally visiting his mother, Carrie, in Oregon after she married her second husband, Lowell Brams (who later became the head of Stevens' record label Asthmatic Kitty). Stevens is of Lithuanian and Greek descent. Sufjan is an Islamic name of Arabic origin, derived from Abu Sufyan ibn Harb. The name was given to Stevens by the founder of Subud, an interfaith spiritual community to which his parents belonged when he was born.

Stevens attended the Detroit Waldorf School, Alanson Public Schools and Interlochen Arts Academy, and he graduated from Harbor Light Christian School. He then attended Hope College in Holland, Michigan, where he graduated Phi Beta Kappa. He then earned an MFA in Creative Writing from The New School in New York City.

While in school, Stevens studied the oboe and the similar English horn, which he plays on his albums. Stevens did not learn to play the guitar until his time at Hope College.

== Career ==
=== Early career and the Fifty States Project (1995–2006) ===
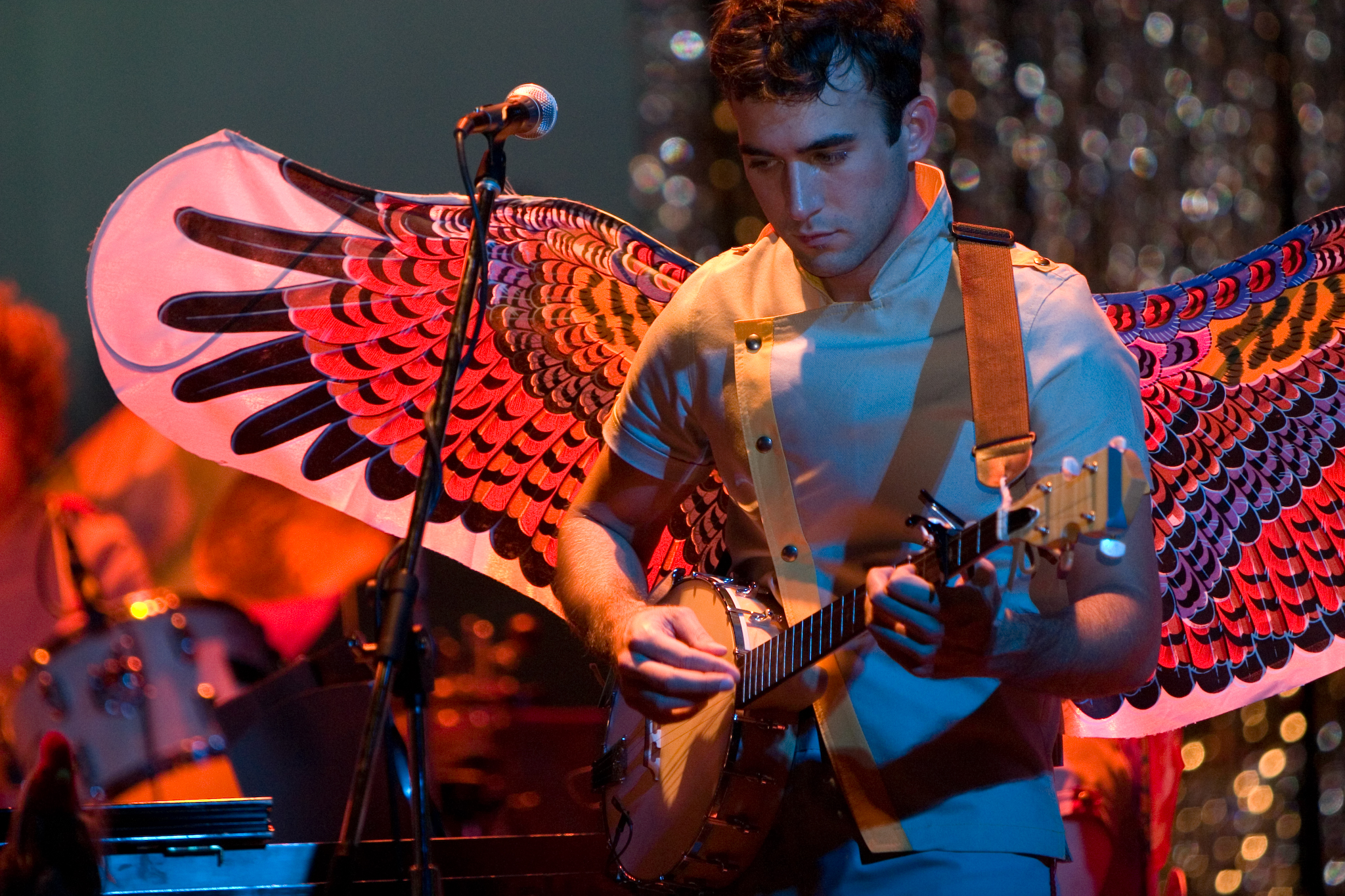
Stevens performing at the Pabst Theater in Milwaukee, Wisconsin

Stevens began his musical career as a member of Marzuki, a folk-rock band from Holland, Michigan, as well as garage band Con Los Dudes. He also played (and continues to play) various instruments for Danielson Famile. During his final semester at Hope College, Stevens wrote and recorded his debut solo album, A Sun Came, which he released on Asthmatic Kitty Records. He later moved to New York City, where he enrolled in a writing program at The New School for Social Research. During his time at the New School, Stevens developed a preoccupation with the short story form, which he believed would lead him to write a novel, but ultimately returned him to songwriting. After graduating, Stevens worked as a graphic designer at Penguin Putnam.

While in New York, Stevens composed and recorded the music for his second album, Enjoy Your Rabbit, a song cycle based around the animals of the Chinese zodiac that delved into electronica.

Stevens followed this with the album Michigan, a collection of folk songs and instrumentals. It includes odes to cities including Detroit and Flint, the Upper Peninsula, and vacation areas such as Tahquamenon Falls and the Sleeping Bear Dunes National Lakeshore. Melded into the scenic descriptions and characters are his own declarations of faith, sorrow, love, and the regeneration of Michigan. Beginning with the album, Stevens announced his intent to write an album for each of the 50 U.S. states, which he termed the Fifty States Project. Following the release of Michigan, Stevens compiled a collection of songs recorded previously into a side project, the album Seven Swans, which was released in March 2004. Stevens did not leave his job in the children's book division at Time Warner until touring for Seven Swans.

"Come On! Feel the Illinoise!"
The introduction of "Come On! Feel the Illinoise!" demonstrates the lush arrangements and various instrumentation used by Stevens in Illinois.

Next, he released the second in the Fifty States project, titled Illinois. Among the subjects explored on Illinois are the cities of Chicago, Decatur and Jacksonville; the World's Columbian Exposition of 1893, the death of a friend on Casimir Pulaski Day, the poet Carl Sandburg, and the serial killer John Wayne Gacy. Stevens had spent the second half of 2004 researching and writing material for the album. As with Michigan, Stevens used the state of Illinois as a leaping-off point for his more personal explorations of faith, family, love, and location. Though slated for release on July 5, 2005, the album was briefly delayed by legal issues regarding the use of an image of Superman in the original album cover artwork. In the double vinyl release, a balloon sticker was placed over Superman on the cover art of the first 5,000 copies. The next printings had an empty space where the Superman image was, as with the CD release. Illinois was widely acclaimed and was the highest-rated album of 2005 on the review aggregator website Metacritic. The 2006 PLUG Independent Music Awards awarded Stevens with the Album of the Year, Best Album Art/Packaging, and Male Artist of the Year. Pitchfork, No Ripcord, and Paste magazine named Illinois as the editors' choice for best album of 2005, and Stevens received the 2005 Pantheon prize, awarded to noteworthy albums selling fewer than 500,000 copies, for Illinois.

In April 2006, Stevens announced that 21 pieces of music he had culled from the Illinois recording sessions would be incorporated into a new album, called The Avalanche, which was released on July 11, 2006. On September 11, 2006, in Nashville, Tennessee, Stevens debuted a new composition, a ten-minute-plus piece titled "Majesty Snowbird". On November 21, 2006, a five CD box set Songs for Christmas was released, which contains originals and Christmas standards recorded every year since 2001 (except 2004). Stevens undertook in the project initially as an exercise to make himself 'appreciate' Christmas more. The songs were the work of an annual collaboration between Stevens and different collaborators, including minister Vito Aiuto; the songs themselves were distributed to friends and family.

Although Stevens' subsequent work was sometimes speculated to tie into future "States" projects, and Stevens himself would make occasional statements alluding to the future of the project, Stevens later admitted that the project had been a "promotional gimmick" and not one he had seriously intended to complete. In November 2009, Stevens admitted to Exclaim! magazine, in regard to the fact that he recently called his fifty-state project a joke, that "I don't really have as much faith in my work as I used to, but I think that's healthy. I think it's allowed me to be less precious about how I work and write. And maybe it's okay for us to take it less seriously."

=== Soundtrack album and various collaborative projects (2007–2009) ===
Over the 2005 winter holidays, Stevens recorded an album with Rosie Thomas and Denison Witmer playing banjo and providing vocals. In April 2006, Pitchfork erroneously announced that Stevens and Thomas were having a baby together, and were forced to print a retraction. Witmer and Thomas later admitted it was an April Fools' prank. In December 2006, the collaborative recordings were digitally released by Nettwerk as a Rosie Thomas album titled These Friends of Mine. The album was released in physical form on March 13, 2007.

On May 31, 2007, Asthmatic Kitty announced that Stevens would be premiering a new project titled The BQE in early November 2007. The project, dubbed a "symphonic and cinematic exploration of New York City's infamous Brooklyn–Queens Expressway", was manifested in a live show. The BQE featured an original film by Stevens (shot in Super 8 film and standard 16 mm), while Stevens and a backing orchestra provided the live soundtrack. The performance used 36 performers which included a small band, a wind and brass ensemble, string players, horn players, and hula hoopers. There were no lyrics to the music. The BQE was commissioned by the Brooklyn Academy of Music as part of their Next Wave Festival and performed on three consecutive nights from November 1–3, 2007.

The performance sold out the 2,109 seat BAM Opera House without any advertising. After three weeks of rehearsing the piece with the three dozen musicians involved, he presented the 30-minute composition. The BQE was followed by an additional one hour of concert by Stevens and his orchestra. The BQE won the 2008 Brendan Gill Prize. In April 2007, in Brooklyn and Philadelphia, Stevens made unannounced appearances on Thomas's tour in support of this album. In 2007, he played shows sporadically, including playing at the Kennedy Center to celebrate the tenth anniversary of the Millennium Stage concerts.

Stevens has also worked as an essayist, contributing to Asthmatic Kitty Records' "Sidebar" feature and Topic Magazine. He wrote the introduction to the 2007 edition of The Best American Nonrequired Reading, a short story about his early childhood education and learning to read titled How I Trumped Rudolf Steiner and Overcame the Tribulations of Illiteracy, One Snickers Bar at a Time. That winter, he hosted an "Xmas Song Exchange Contest" in which winner Alec Duffy won exclusive rights to the original Stevens song "Lonely Man of Winter". The track could only be heard by attending private listening parties at Duffy's home in Brooklyn and at places around the world until 2018, when Duffy negotiated with Asthmatic Kitty Records to release the song with all proceeds going towards Duffy's organization JACK.

Stevens has contributed to the music of Denison Witmer, Soul-Junk, Half-handed Cloud, Brother Danielson, Danielson Famile, Serena-Maneesh, Castanets, Will Stratton, Shannon Stephens, Clare & the Reasons, Little Scream, and Liz Janes. In 2007 alone, Stevens played piano on The National's album Boxer, produced and contributed many instrumental tracks to Rosie Thomas's album These Friends of Mine, multiple instruments on Ben + Vesper's album All This Could Kill You and oboe and vocals to David Garland's 2007 album Noise in You.

He has contributed covers of Tim Buckley ("She Is"), Joni Mitchell ("Free Man in Paris"), Daniel Johnston ("Worried Shoes"), John Fahey ("Variation on 'Commemorative Transfiguration & Communion at Magruder Park"), The Innocence Mission ("The Lakes of Canada"), Bob Dylan ("Ring Them Bells"), Drake ("Hotline Bling"), Prince ("Kiss") and The Beatles ("What Goes On") to various tribute albums. His versions of "Free Man in Paris" and "What Goes On" are notable for only retaining the lyrics of the original, as Stevens has taken his own interpretation on the melody and arrangement. His rendition of "The Star-Spangled Banner" has a similar rearranged melody and arrangement as well as a whole new verse.

His songs "The Tallest Man, The Broadest Shoulders" and "All the Trees of the Field Will Clap Their Hands" were featured in the 2006 British comedy-drama Driving Lessons, starring Julie Walters and Rupert Grint. In 2008, he produced Welcome to The Welcome Wagon, the debut album of Brooklyn-based husband and wife duo Vito and Monique Aiuto, The Welcome Wagon.

In February 2009, Stevens contributed "You Are the Blood" to the AIDS benefit album Dark Was the Night produced by the Red Hot Organization. In April 2009, Stevens uploaded a song about director Sofia Coppola online. This song was written while Stevens was in college, from a series of songs about names.

Stevens recalled:

A few weeks later, our dog got hit by a snowplow and I forgot all about the problem of names. Until college, when I learned to play the guitar, and, as an exercise, started writing songs (very poorly executed) in the same way that Henry Ford produced the automobile: assembly-line-style. I wrote songs for the days of the week (poor Monday!). Songs for the planets (poor Pluto!). Songs for the Apostles (poor Judas!). And, finally, when all else failed, I started a series of songs for names. [...] Each piece was a rhetorical, philosophical, musical rumination on all the possible names I had entertained years before when my parents had given me the one chance to change my own. Oh fates! I sang these songs in the privacy of my dorm room, behind closed doors, pillows and cushions stuffed in the air vents so no one would hear. And then I almost failed Latin class, my grades plummeted, my social life dissolved into ping pong tournaments in the residence halls, and, gradually, my interest in music (or anything divine, creative, fruitful, enriching) completely waned. I turned to beer. And cigarettes. And TV sitcoms. And candy bars. Oh well! A perfectly good youth wasted on junk food! That is, until a few months ago, when I came across some of the old name songs, stuffed onto tape cassettes, 4-track recorders, forgotten boxes, forgotten shelves, forgotten hard drives. It was like finding an old diary, or a high school yearbook, senior picture with lens flare and pockmarks, slightly cute and embarrassing. What was I thinking?

=== Solo studio albums (2009–2011) ===
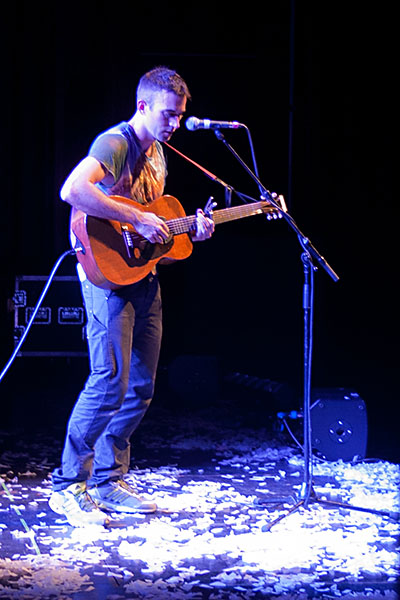
Stevens in 2011, following his return to recording and touring in 2010 after a hiatus

In September 2009, Stevens began performing four new songs while on his fall tour, "All Delighted People", "Impossible Soul", "Too Much" and "Age of Adz". That year Stevens contributed to an album with his stepfather, Lowell Brams, titled Music for Insomnia. The album was released December 8, 2009. On October 6, 2009, Stevens' label, Asthmatic Kitty Records, released an album of versions of his 2001 album Enjoy Your Rabbit rearranged for strings and performed by the Osso String Quartet, titled Run Rabbit Run.

In 2010, Stevens was featured on The National's album High Violet, released in May, and sang backing vocals for the band on the Late Show with David Letterman. Following the release of High Violet, band frontman Matt Berninger mentioned that Stevens was recording a new album in the band's studio and that The National would appear on some of the tracks. In early August, Stevens announced North American tour dates across dozens of cities. On August 20, 2010, Stevens suddenly and unexpectedly released a new collection of tracks, the All Delighted People EP, for digital download. The EP is built around two versions of the title track, "All Delighted People". The EP surprisingly rose to No. 27 on the Billboard 200 albums solely through its digital sales. On August 26, Asthmatic Kitty announced that Stevens would release his newest full-length album, The Age of Adz, on October 12. NPR streamed the album until it was released on October 12, 2010.

The two albums featured a wide range of arrangements, from orchestral to electronic. Song lengths were also extended; the track "Djohariah" from All Delighted People is 17 minutes long, while "Impossible Soul" from The Age of Adz is 25 minutes long. The albums also feature many styles from disco to folk.

Stevens has stated in interviews that in 2009 and 2010 he suffered from a mysterious debilitating virus infection that affected his nervous system. He experienced chronic pain and was forced to stop working on music for several months. He said: "The Age of Adz, is, in some ways, a result of that process of working through health issues and getting much more in touch with my physical self. That's why I think the record's really obsessed with sensation and has a hysterical melodrama to it."

On October 12, 2010, Stevens began his North American tour in Montreal, featuring virtually all new material. The tour lasted just over a month and ended on November 15, 2010, in New York City. Stevens toured Australia and New Zealand in early 2011, featured as part of the Sydney Festival, and appeared on-stage with The National during the last of three sold-out Auckland shows. He also toured Europe and the United Kingdom in April and May 2011, playing there for the first time in five years. His shows mostly consisted of new material, but he did play many older tracks from Seven Swans and Illinois. Stevens ended the Age of Adz tour with two shows in Prospect Park, Brooklyn, New York.

=== Further collaborative projects (2012–2014) ===
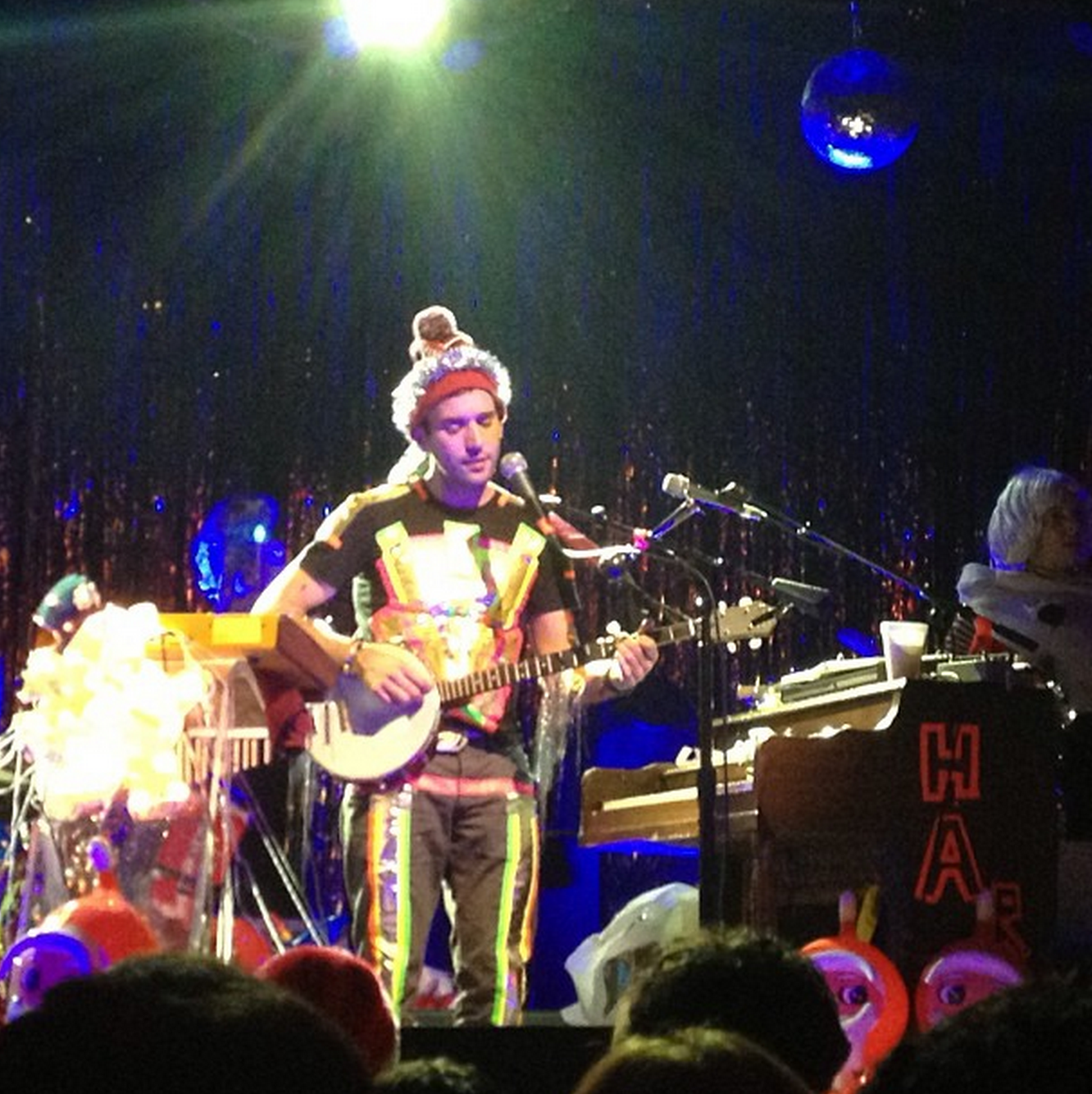
Stevens performing in Providence, Rhode Island, as part of his "The Sirfjam Stephanapolous Christmas Sing-a-Long Seasonal Affective Disorder Spectacular Music Pageant Variety Show Disaster" tour in 2012

On February 27, 2012, it was announced Stevens would release a collaborative EP titled Beak & Claw, on March 20, with artists Son Lux and Serengeti under the name S / S / S on the Anticon record label. Stevens released a 7" with close friend Rosie Thomas for Record Store Day 2012, titled Hit & Run Vol. 1. He also collaborated with choreographer Justin Peck on two ballets for the New York City Ballet: Year of the Rabbit (2012) and Everywhere We Go (2014), both to great critical acclaim. Stevens, along with fellow Brooklyn musicians Nico Muhly and Bryce Dessner, began performing their classical project Planetarium, a song-cycle based around the planets in the Solar System in countries such as England, The Netherlands, Australia and France from March to July 2012.

On October 2, 2012, it was announced that Stevens would release a second set of Christmas albums, titled Silver & Gold: Songs for Christmas, Vols. 6–10, on November 13, 2012. Silver & Gold contains 58 songs, allowing for a total of 100 when combined with his first set of Christmas albums, Songs for Christmas. To support this new release, Stevens performed in 24 cities around the United States for his 2012 tour titled "The Sirfjam Stephanapolous Christmas Sing-a-Long Seasonal Affective Disorder Spectacular Music Pageant Variety Show Disaster". On December 11, 2012, Stevens released Chopped and Scrooged, a Christmas-themed hip-hop mixtape featuring music from Silver & Gold.

As a part of Joyful Noise's 2013 Flexi Disc Series, Stevens and Cat Martino, of Stranger Cat, recorded the single "Take the Time". Martino has contributed to many of Stevens' past projects, including The Age of Adz. On March 18, 2014, Stevens released the self-titled album, Sisyphus, with Son Lux and rapper Serengeti.

In 2014, his work Run Rabbit Run, had its US premiere when performed at the Naumburg Orchestral Concerts, in the Naumburg Bandshell, Central Park, in the summer series.

=== Carrie and Lowell (2015–2017) ===
On January 12, 2015, Asthmatic Kitty Records announced that Stevens would release a new album called Carrie & Lowell. Stevens shared the first single from the album, "No Shade in the Shadow of the Cross", on February 16, 2015. Carrie & Lowell was released on March 31, 2015. The album garnered critical acclaim upon its release. Stereogum placed the album on its best albums of the decade list in 16th place and described it as "an elegant heartbreaker of an album", while Consequence of Sound ranked it the 43rd best album of the decade, calling it "a special brew that makes even the most intimate personal moment feel parabolic".

The album follows the nuances and trials of life with Stevens' mother, Carrie, who was diagnosed bipolar and schizophrenic, was addicted to drugs, and abandoned him when he was a year old; it also includes Stevens' stepfather, Lowell Brams. Stevens also stated that the songwriting for the album was incited by his process of grieving and coming to terms with his and his mother's relationship following his mother's death due to stomach cancer in 2012. On January 26, 2015, Asthmatic Kitty Records announced a tour of North America, which began in April 2015, to coincide with the new album. Stevens also headlined the End of the Road Festival in the United Kingdom in September. On July 21, a second set of U.S. tour dates, which took place in October and November 2015, was announced.

After Stevens performed new compositions about the Solar System alongside composers Nico Muhly and Bryce Dessner in Amsterdam in April 2012, it was reported in March 2017 that the three and James McAlister would produce an album. The "80-minute concept album", titled Planetarium, was released in July 2017. On April 28, 2017, a live album and concert film, Carrie & Lowell Live was released, featuring new interpretations, re-workings and expansions of the songs from Carrie & Lowell. In addition to the live album, Stevens announced another Carrie & Lowell companion piece, The Greatest Gift, released on November 24. It includes four unreleased songs from the album sessions, as well as several remixes and a demo.

=== Call Me by Your Name and The Decalogue (2017–2019) ===
In January 2017, it was announced that Stevens would contribute original songs written and recorded by himself for the coming-of-age romantic drama film Call Me by Your Name. The film was released on November 24, 2017, by Sony Pictures Classics. The soundtrack of the film features two new songs and a remix of an existing song by Stevens: "Visions of Gideon", which has been described as containing "lush orchestrations" and "staccato-heavy piano refrains", "Mystery of Love", which was featured in the film's trailer as well as the film itself, and an "ethereal piano arrangement" of The Age of Adz track "Futile Devices". In his review of the film, Consequence of Sound writer Dominick Suzanne-Mayer praised Stevens' work as a composer on the film, noting that he "has a perfect ear for the film's portrayal of a summer that's getting shorter by the day." In January 2018, "Mystery of Love" earned a nomination for the year's Academy Award for Best Original Song. Later in the year, the song received a Grammy Award nomination for Best Song Written for Visual Media. The song was featured in the second season of the Netflix series Sex Education.

In December 2017, Stevens released two versions of "Tonya Harding", a song about the figure skater of the same name. The song's video shows a clip of the eponymous skater performing at the 1991 US Figure Skating Championships. Two days later, the single was offered for digital download and streaming, to be followed later by a cassette and vinyl release, in two versions, the one featured in the video (subtitled "in D major") and a piano-only arrangement ("in E♭ major"); in a short essay, Stevens revealed his intention to write a song about Harding since 1991. According to Stevens, "I've been trying to write a Tonya Harding song since I first saw her skate at the U.S. Figure Skating Championships in 1991. She's a complicated subject for a song partly because the hard facts of her life are so strange, disputable, heroic, unprecedented, and indelibly American." Stevens later revealed that the song was offered to the producers to the biographical film I, Tonya, which was released in the same period, but that they decided not to include it in the film.

In October 2018, Stevens performed and recorded with indie folk musician Angelo De Augustine a collaborative duo of the latter's "Time" single. On May 29, 2019, Stevens released two new songs, respectively titled "Love Yourself" and "With My Whole Heart", which were released in celebration of Pride Month. Sam Sodomsky of Pitchfork called "With My Whole Heart" "five minutes of unabashed and (relatively) unadorned inspirational soft rock" and "Love Yourself" "similarly glowing". Pride-themed T-shirts designed by Stevens also debuted alongside the singles. He later stated that a portion of the song and shirts' proceeds would go to the Ali Forney Center in Brooklyn and the Ruth Ellis Center in Detroit, two organizations which aim to help LGBT youth. In October 2019, Stevens released an album titled The Decalogue with pianist Timo Andres. It is based on a ballet of the same name by Justin Peck, composed by Stevens.

=== Aporia, The Ascension, and Convocations (2020–2022) ===
On March 24, 2020, Stevens released a collaborative album with his stepfather, Lowell Brams, titled Aporia. In June, Stevens announced his eighth studio album, titled The Ascension, along with the album's lead single "America", which was released on July 3. The album's second single, "Video Game", was released on August 13, and the third single, "Sugar", was released on September 15. The Ascension was released in full on September 25.

On May 6, 2021, Stevens released a five-volume album of meditation music, called Convocations. On July 7, 2021, Stevens announced the release of a collaborative album, called A Beginner's Mind, that he recorded with fellow folk singer-songwriter Angelo De Augustine. On the same day, they unveiled the cover and the first two singles, "Reach Out" and "Olympus". A Beginner's Mind is a concept album, each track being inspired by a different film from either the 20th or 21st century.

=== Reflections and Javelin (2023–present) ===
On April 18, 2023, Stevens announced the album Reflections, which contains duo-piano pieces he had written for Houston Ballet. Along with announcing Reflections, Stevens released the album's first track, "Ekstasis", a piece performed by pianists Timo Andres and Conor Hanick. Reflections was released on May 19, 2023, on Asthmatic Kitty Records.

On August 14, 2023, Stevens released the single "So You Are Tired", alongside an announcement for the album Javelin. The record released on October 6, 2023. The record has been described as his first singer-songwriter album since Carrie & Lowell. The album includes contributions from Adrienne Maree Brown, Hannah Cohen, Pauline Delassus, Megan Lui, and Nedelle Torrisi, as well as the National's Bryce Dessner, who contributed acoustic and electric guitar for the track "Shit Talk".

On January 28, 2024, the musical Illinoise debuted at Chicago Shakespeare Theater. Based on the album Illinois in its entirety, and with additional music & lyrics contributed by Stevens, it was directed & choreographed by Justin Peck, who discussed the project with Stevens on and off for several years before they agreed to move forward with it. The story was written by Peck and Jackie Sibblies Drury. On March 19, it was announced that the show would transfer to the St. James Theatre on Broadway for a limited time from April 24 until August 10. This production received four nominations at the 77th Tony Awards, including Best Musical, Best Lighting Design of a Musical for Brandon Stirling Baker, and Best Orchestrations for Timo Andres, ultimately winning one for Best Choreography for Peck.

== Artistry ==
=== Musical style ===
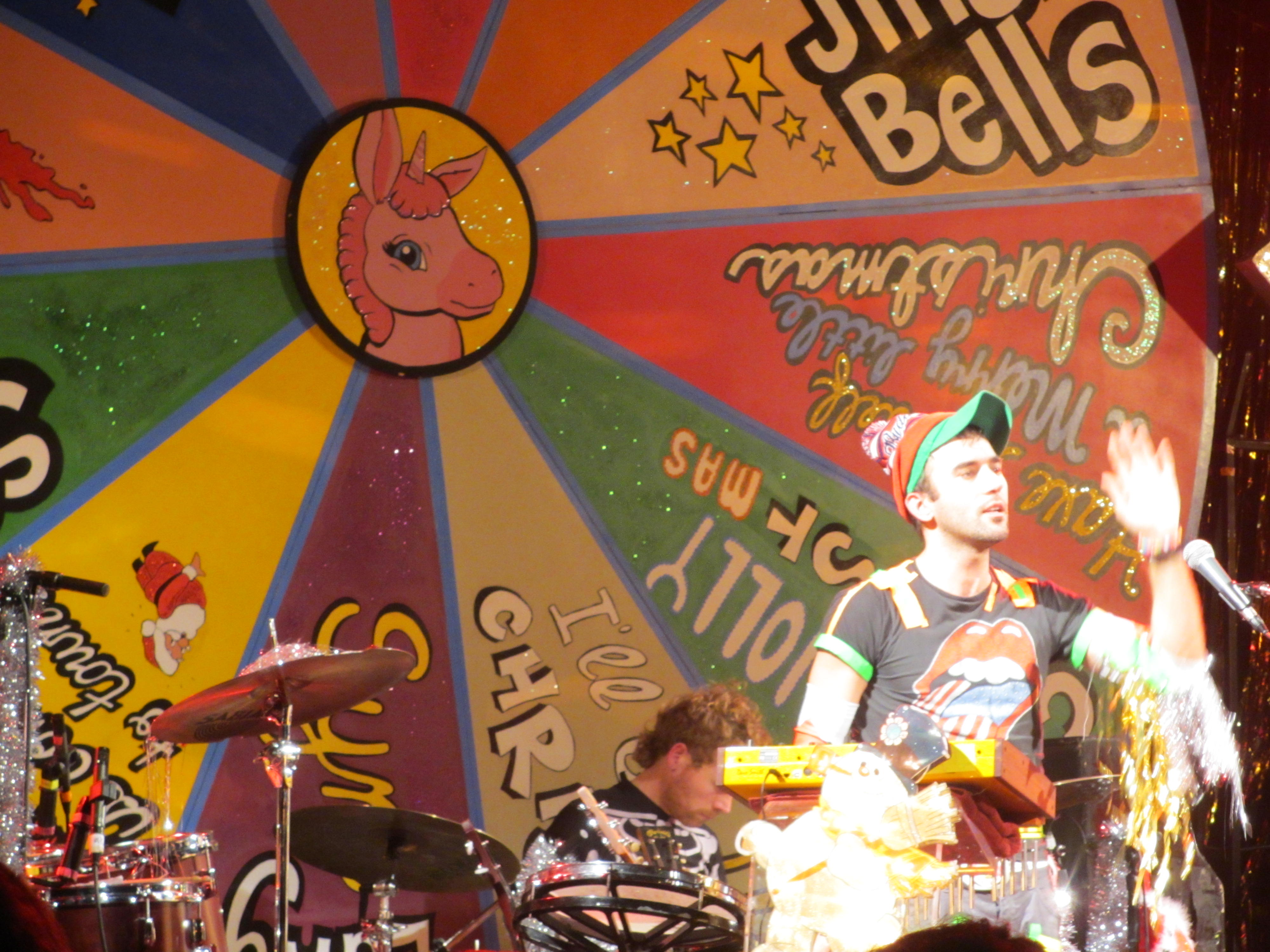
Stevens touring in 2012, performing Christmas music in the Sufjan Stevens Christmas Sing-a-Long: Seasonal Affective Disorder Yuletide Disaster Pageant on Ice

Stevens' sound has been most generally associated with genres such as indie folk, alternative rock, indie rock, indie pop, baroque pop, chamber pop, folk pop, avant-garde folk, lo-fi folk, and electronica. A multi-instrumentalist, Stevens is known for his frequent use of the banjo, but also plays guitar, piano, drums, woodwind, and several other instruments on his records, layered through the use of multitrack recording.

=== Themes ===
Stevens' work is known to explore themes of love, religion, outer space, and grief. His record label stated that 2010's The Age of Adz featured themes of "love, sex, death, disease, illness, anxiety, and suicide".

Despite many of his songs having spiritual allusions, Stevens does not identify as a contemporary Christian music artist or frequently discuss religion with the press. He told The Village Voice: "I don't think music media is the real forum for theological discussions. I think I've said things and sung about things that probably weren't appropriate for this kind of form. And I just feel like it's not my work or my place to be making claims and statements because I often think it's misunderstood."

During a 2004 interview with Adrian Pannett for Comes with a Smile magazine, when asked how important faith was to his music, he said "I don't like talking about that stuff in the public forum because, I think, certain themes and convictions are meant for personal conversation." In a 2006 interview, he said "It's not so much that faith influences us as it lives in us. In every circumstance (giving a speech or tying my shoes), I am living and moving and being."

== Personal life ==
Stevens has resided in Upstate New York near the Catskill Mountains since 2019. Before this, he lived in New York City for 20 years. He is a Christian. Stevens also stated in 2005 that he attended an Anglo-Catholic Episcopal church.

In September 2023, Stevens revealed in a post on Instagram that he had been hospitalized the previous month and diagnosed with Guillain–Barré syndrome. He wrote that he was undergoing physical rehabilitation to relearn how to walk after the illness.

In October 2023, Stevens dedicated his new album Javelin to his partner, Evans Richardson, who died in April of the same year. Richardson had served as the chief of staff at the Studio Museum in Harlem, which is dedicated to showcasing the work of black artists; in 2021 he had also been elected as chair of the accreditation commission for the American Alliance of Museums, with "a focus on diversity and access for the communities they serve". Stevens' dedication of Javelin to Richardson was the first time that Stevens had publicly discussed him or his own sexuality.

== Awards and nominations ==
List of awards and nominations for Sufjan Stevens
Award	Year	Nominee(s)	Category	Result	Ref.
Academy Awards	2018	"Mystery of Love"	Best Original Song	Nominated	
AMFT Awards	2017	"Mystery of Love"	Best Song Written For Visual Media	Won	
Awards Circuit Community Awards	2017	"Mystery of Love"	Best Original Song	Won	
Critics Choice Awards	2018	"Mystery of Love"	Best Song	Nominated	
David di Donatello Awards	2019	"Mystery of Love"	Best Original Song	Won	
Dorian Awards	2019	2018 Oscar's Performance	TV Musical Performance of the Year	Nominated	
Georgia Film Critics Association	2018	"Mystery of Love"	Best Original Song	Nominated	
Gold Derby Awards	2018	"Mystery of Love"	Original Song	Nominated	
Gold Derby Awards	2018	"Visions of Gideon"	Original Song	Won	
Gold Derby Awards	2020	"Visions of Gideon"	Original Song of the Decade	Nominated	
Gold Derby Awards	2020	"Mystery of Love"	Original Song of the Decade	Nominated	
Grammy Awards	2019	"Mystery of Love"	Best Song Written for Visual Media	Nominated	
Guild of Music Supervisors Awards	2018	"Mystery of Love"	Best Song/Recording Created for a Film	Won	
Hawaii Film Critics Society	2018	"Mystery of Love"	Best Original Song	Nominated	
Houston Film Critics Society Awards	2018	"Visions of Gideon"	Best Original Song	Nominated	
International Cinephile Society Awards	2018	"Call Me By Your Name"	Best Original Score	Nominated	
International Online Cinema Awards	2018	"Mystery of Love"	Best Original Song	Won	
International Online Cinema Awards	2018	"Visions of Gideon"	Best Original Song	Nominated	
New Mexico Film Critics	2017	"Mystery of Love"	Best Original Song	Won	
Online Film & Television Association	2018	"Mystery of Love"	Best Music, Original Song	Nominated	
Online Film & Television Association	2018	"Visions of Gideon"	Best Music, Original Song	Nominated	
PLUG Independent Music Awards	2006	"Illinois"	Album of the Year	Won	
PLUG Independent Music Awards	2006	"Illinois"	Album/Art Packaging of the Year	Won	
PLUG Independent Music Awards	2006	"Illinois"	Indie Rock Album of the Year	Nominated	
PLUG Independent Music Awards	2006	Himself	Artist of the Year	Nominated	
PLUG Independent Music Awards	2006	Himself	Male Artist of the Year	Won	
PLUG Independent Music Awards	2006	"Chicago"	Song of the Year	Nominated	
PLUG Independent Music Awards	2007	Himself	Male Artist of the Year	Nominated	
RTHK International Pop Poll Awards	2019	"Mystery of Love"	Top Ten International Gold Songs	Nominated	
Shortlist Music Prize	2005	"Illinois"		Won	

== Discography ==
=== Studio albums ===
- A Sun Came (2000)
- Enjoy Your Rabbit (2001)
- Michigan (2003)
- Seven Swans (2004)
- Illinois (2005)
- The Age of Adz (2010)
- Carrie & Lowell (2015)
- The Ascension (2020)
- Convocations (2021)
- Javelin (2023)

=== Collaborative albums ===
- Sisyphus (2014), with Serengeti and Son Lux
- Planetarium (2017), with Bryce Dessner, Nico Muhly, and James McAlister
- Aporia (2020), with Lowell Brams
- A Beginner's Mind (2021), with Angelo De Augustine

=== Compilation albums ===
- The Avalanche (2006)
- Songs for Christmas (2006)
- Silver & Gold (2012)

=== Soundtrack albums ===
- The BQE (2009)
- The Decalogue (2019), with Timo Andres
- Reflections (2023), with Timo Andres and Conor Hanick

== See also ==
- List of American Grammy Award winners and nominees
- List of LGBTQ Academy Award winners and nominees
