= Living in Skin =

Studio album by Jason Harrod
- Released: 2000
- Genre: Folk

Jason Harrod chronology
Live (with Brian Funck)	Living in Skin (2000)	Bright As You (2005)

Living in Skin is the first album that Jason Harrod recorded as a solo artist.

== Track listing ==
1. "Siren Song" - 4:19
2. "Waiting For My Day" - 5:37
3. "When I Get Home" - 3:14
4. "Ferry Man" - 3:22
5. "Powder House Rag" - 2:56
6. "Siobhan" - 4:37
7. "Looming" - 3:57
8. "Lifeline" - 4:50
9. "Carolina" - 4:44

== External sources ==
- Official Website
