= Bright as You =

Bright As You

Studio album by Jason Harrod
- Released: 2005
- Genre: Folk

Jason Harrod chronology
Living In Skin (2000)	Bright As You (2005)	Highliner (2013)

Bright As You is the second solo album by singer/songwriter Jason Harrod.

== Track listing ==
1. "The Sun Is Up" - 2:56
2. "Kickin Mule" - 3:51
3. "When I Fly Away" - 3:15
4. "Messed Up Everywhere Blues" - 5:37
5. "Bright As You" - 2:01
6. "Night, Fall On Me" - 3:19
7. "Voyeurs" - 3:41
8. "My Mad Girlfriend" - 4:13
9. "Good Night Sunshine" - 3:51
10. "For Your Time" - 4:01
