= Aporia (Sufjan Stevens and Lowell Brams album) =

Studio album by Sufjan Stevens and Lowell Brams
- Released: March 24, 2020
- Genre: New age; synthwave
- Length: 42:06
- Label: Asthmatic Kitty

Sufjan Stevens chronology
The Decalogue (2019)	Aporia (2020)	The Ascension (2020)

Lowell Brams chronology
Library Catalog Music Series: Music for Insomnia (2009)	Aporia (2020)

Aporia is an album by American musician Sufjan Stevens and his stepfather, Lowell Brams. It was released through Asthmatic Kitty on March 24, 2020 with a live preview held on YouTube on March 23, 2020.

== Background ==
The album was inspired by new-age music, with Stevens citing Enya and Boards of Canada as major influences, as well as the soundtracks for the films Blade Runner, Under the Skin, and Hereditary. Stevens explained that the album marks the retirement of his stepfather and business partner Lowell Brams, with whom he founded the label Asthmatic Kitty, saying that it "tells a bigger story of stewardship and mentorship. He's been there since I was five. [...] This record is a synthesis of all of that history."

The album was initially slated for release on March 27, 2020, but the duo pushed up the release to March 24 due to growing concerns over record stores shutting down in response to the COVID-19 pandemic.

== Recording ==
Stevens and Brams worked on the album during Brams' visits to Stevens' home in New York. Stevens stated that the album primarily came about as a result of jam sessions: "You know how it is with jamming, ninety percent of it is absolutely horrible, but if you're just lucky enough, ten percent is magic. I just kept pulling out these little magical moments." He and Brams then took the best parts of their jam sessions and arranged them into songs.

== Critical reception ==
Professional ratings
Aggregate scores
Source	Rating
Metacritic	72/100
Review scores
Source	Rating
AllMusic	3.5/5 stars
Consequence of Sound	B+
Exclaim!	7/10
Pitchfork	6.8/10

On review aggregator Metacritic, Aporia has received a weighted average score of 72 out of 100 based on reviews from 11 critics, indicating "generally favorable" reception. Reviewing the album for AllMusic, Mark Deming found the album to be "sometimes an aural journey through a labyrinth, but it never sounds like the participants are lost, and if Brams has some time on his hands, he could find worse ways to spend it than jamming with his stepson again". Grant Sharples of Consequence of Sound graded the album a B+ and opined that it is "overall quite peaceful" with "moments of brashness and tension, and it's through these internal contradictions between tension and release that Aporia distinguishes itself".

Writing for Exclaim!, Allie Gregory rated the album 7 out of 10 and judged that it "would be best suited to a movie score or soundtracking a meditation practice", as each "fuzzed-out song lends itself to a distinct '80s sci-fi aesthetic [that] always leans futuristic, compositionally just shy of dystopian". Ultimately, she concluded that Aporia is an "ode to their [Stevens' and Brams'] decades-long father-son relationship and a fitting conclusion to their musically enriched partnership". In a review for Pitchfork, Peyton Thomas rated the album 6.8 out of 10 and called it "a collection of warm, improvisatory synth-wave epics" that are "intimate and unvarnished" and "double as a testament to the power of found family".

== Track listing ==
All tracks are written by Sufjan Stevens and Lowell Brams.

Aporia track listing
No.	Title	Length
1.	"Ousia"	2:33
2.	"What It Takes"	3:23
3.	"Disinheritance"	1:13
4.	"Agathon"	3:02
5.	"Determined Outcome"	2:12
6.	"Misology"	1:49
7.	"Afterworld Alliance"	2:47
8.	"Palinodes"	0:32
9.	"Backhanded Cloud"	1:26
10.	"Glorious You"	1:49
11.	"For Raymond Scott"	0:34
12.	"Matronymic"	0:57
13.	"The Red Desert"	2:54
14.	"Conciliation"	1:20
15.	"Ataraxia"	1:12
16.	"The Unlimited"	2:14
17.	"The Runaround"	3:35
18.	"Climb That Mountain"	3:00
19.	"Captain Praxis"	2:13
20.	"Eudaimonia"	2:19
21.	"The Lydian Ring"	1:02
Total length:		42:06

== Personnel ==
- Lowell Brams – composition, music
- Sufjan Stevens – composition, music, mixing, production

Additional musicians

- Thomas Bartlett
- Nick Berry
- Cat Martino
- Yuuki Matthews
- James McAllister
- Steve Moore
- John Ringhofer
- D. M. Stith

Technical personnel

- T. W. Walsh – mastering

== Charts ==
Sales chart performance for Aporia
Chart (2020)	Peak position
Scottish Albums (OCC)	27
UK Album Downloads (OCC)	69
US New Age Albums (Billboard)	5
US Top Album Sales (Billboard)	94

== See also ==
- List of 2020 albums
