= Enjoy Your Rabbit =

Studio album by Sufjan Stevens
- Released: September 17, 2001
- Recorded: 2000–2001
- Genres: Electronica; IDM; glitch; ambient
- Length: 79:04
- Languages: English, Chinese
- Label: Asthmatic Kitty
- Producer: Sufjan Stevens

Sufjan Stevens chronology
A Sun Came (2000)	Enjoy Your Rabbit (2001)	Michigan (2003)

Enjoy Your Rabbit is the second studio album by American musician Sufjan Stevens. It is a song cycle inspired by the animals of the Chinese zodiac. The album was reworked and rearranged for string instruments and released in 2009 as Run Rabbit Run.

== Concept and production ==
Each song on the album corresponds to a different part of the Chinese zodiac, with the exception of "Year of Our Lord" which, like many of Stevens' songs, references his Christian faith. In an interview with Delusions of Adequacy, Stevens revealed that he "wanted to create an aural environment for each animal: a movie soundtrack (without the movie)." He also described the relationship of imagination in listeners to the instrumental nature of the album, saying "Many people say the same thing: that they inevitably end up visualizing a place or a picture when listening (carefully) to the album. Maybe this is the purpose of instrumental music in the first place. There are no lyrics (or narrative) to encourage the listener. Therefore you are free to imagine what you like."

The process of creating the album "required tremendous patience and self-abnegation" with Stevens noting that he "amassed hours (months, years) of raw material" until he "was left with the most minute sample of something ... which might somehow, in some abstract way, resemble an ox, or a rooster, or a horse". Like much of Stevens' music, Enjoy Your Rabbit had a religious component in its conception, with Stevens describing how he "put together argumentative essays, stanzas of free verse poetry, persuasive dissertations and assertions ... to prove the existence of God based on the 12-year lunar calendar."

== Critical reception ==
Professional ratings
Review scores
Source	Rating
AllMusic	4/5 stars
Pitchfork	7.7/10

Enjoy Your Rabbit received generally positive reviews. Michael Crumsho of Dusted described it as "a great record", noting Stevens' ability to "produce melodies that are uplifting, catchy and memorable" but critically remarking that it "remains to be seen, however, if Sufjan will learn that the most elaborate path from Point A to B is not necessarily the best". Jason Nickey of Pitchfork referred to Enjoy Your Rabbit positively as "a fully realized piece of work" and noted he is "looking forward to seeing where [Stevens] goes from here". Writing for AllMusic, Nickey also commented on how the album "maps out a wide musical territory ... in the process, evoking a surprising array of moods".

== Track listing ==
All tracks are written by Sufjan Stevens.

No.	Title	Length
1.	"Year of the Asthmatic Cat"	0:24
2.	"Year of the Monkey"	4:20
3.	"Year of the Rat"	8:22
4.	"Year of the Ox"	4:01
5.	"Year of the Boar"	3:55
6.	"Year of the Tiger"	4:24
7.	"Year of the Snake"	6:47
8.	"Year of the Sheep"	3:34
9.	"Year of the Rooster"	6:24
10.	"Year of the Dragon"	9:26
11.	"Enjoy Your Rabbit"	4:47
12.	"Year of the Dog"	4:52
13.	"Year of the Horse"	13:18
14.	"Year of Our Lord"	4:30
Total length:		79:04

== Personnel ==
- Sufjan Stevens – composition, performance, production
- Tom Eaton – trumpet
- Liz Janes – vocals
- Rafter Roberts – mastering
- Matt Morgan – artwork
- Mannar Wong – Chinese vocals
