= Michigan (album) =

Studio album by Sufjan Stevens
- Released: July 1, 2003
- Recorded: 2003 in multiple locations
- Genre: Indie folk; folk pop; baroque pop
- Length: 65:58
- Label: Sounds Familyre, Asthmatic Kitty/Secretly Canadian, Rough Trade
- Producer: Sufjan Stevens

Sufjan Stevens chronology
Enjoy Your Rabbit (2001)	Michigan (2003)	Seven Swans (2004)

Michigan (styled Sufjan Stevens Presents... Greetings from Michigan, the Great Lake State on the cover) is the third studio album by American indie folk songwriter Sufjan Stevens, released on July 1, 2003, on Sounds Familyre, Asthmatic Kitty and Secretly Canadian in the US, and on Rough Trade in Europe. It features songs referencing places, events, and persons related to the U.S. state of Michigan.

== Recording and production ==
The album was recorded and produced entirely by Stevens, using relatively cheap equipment for a market release. All of the tracks were recorded using 2 Shure SM57s and an AKG C1000, running through a Roland VS880EX, at a sampling rate of 32 kHz (lower than the rates typically used in recording). Michigan was produced in Pro Tools, which Stevens has also used for his following albums.

The instrumentation was recorded in various locations: a home in Petoskey, Michigan; Buxton School in Williamstown, Massachusetts; the N. J. Rec. Room in Clarksboro, New Jersey; and throughout Brooklyn, including Stevens' apartment and those of his friends and St. Paul's Church.

A 20th-anniversary re-release was released on June 13, 2023.

== Artwork ==
Album art features original hand-paintings by Martha Stewart Living crafts editor Laura Normandin.

The two-disc vinyl edition of Michigan contains an inscription within the run-off groove of each LP side:

- "Say YES to Michigan!": This was an old state tourism board slogan.
- "Go! Tigers!": The Detroit Tigers are a Major League Baseball team based in Michigan.
- "If you seek a Pleasant Peninsula, look about you": This is the English translation of Michigan's state motto.
- "The Great Lake State": This is a popular nickname for Michigan.

== Critical reception ==
Professional ratings
Review scores
Source	Rating
AllMusic	4.5/5 stars
Collective	3.5/5 stars
The Guardian	5/5 stars
The Irish Times	5/5 stars
Mojo	4/5 stars
Now	4/5
Pitchfork	8.5/10
Q	4/5 stars
Tiny Mix Tapes	4.5/5 stars
Uncut	4/5 stars

Michigan received acclaim from critics. Brandon Stosuy of Pitchfork described the album as "a beautiful, sprawling homage" to the state, noting its "lush production", but criticizing the excessive length of some of the album's tracks. In December 2003, American webzine Somewhere Cold voted Michigan Album of the Year on their 2003 Somewhere Cold Awards Hall of Fame list. A year later, in December 2004, Somewhere Cold voted Michigan Vinyl of the Year on their 2004 Somewhere Cold Awards Hall of Fame list.

=== Legacy ===
Upon the album's tenth anniversary, Stereogum's Chris DeVille stated: "[Stevens's] widescreen love letter to his home state was such a momentous leap forward... Sufjan has produced a wealth of fascinating, deeply affecting (and sometimes deeply affected) music over the years... Nowadays, aggressive guitar bands like Coliseum are considered punk or metal because indie rock is the kind of genre where neoclassical whiz kid Nico Muhly contributes string arrangements to seemingly every major record, where Régine Chassagne passionately rocks the accordion, where Bon Iver channels Richard Marx unironically. Michigan’s flurry of glockenspiels, oboes, trombones, and, yes, banjos had a lot to do with that."

By 2005, it had sold 27,000 copies in the United States, according to Nielsen SoundScan.

The song "Redford" was the inspiration for the name of the protagonist of The Roots' 2011 album Undun, who used the song as the opening to a four-part instrumental movement at the end of the album.

== Track listing ==
All tracks are written by Sufjan Stevens and published by New Jerusalem Music, ASCAP.

No.	Title	Length
1.	"Flint (For the Unemployed and Underpaid)"	3:43
2.	"All Good Naysayers, Speak Up! Or Forever Hold Your Peace!"	4:33
3.	"For the Widows in Paradise, for the Fatherless in Ypsilanti"	3:57
4.	"Say Yes! to M!ch!gan!"	2:45
5.	"The Upper Peninsula"	3:23
6.	"Tahquamenon Falls"	2:18
7.	"Holland"	3:26
8.	"Detroit, Lift Up Your Weary Head! (Rebuild! Restore! Reconsider!)"	8:20
9.	"Romulus"	4:41
10.	"Alanson, Crooked River"	1:18
11.	"Sleeping Bear, Sault Saint Marie"	2:52
12.	"They Also Mourn Who Do Not Wear Black (For the Homeless in Muskegon)"	6:21
13.	"Oh God, Where Are You Now? (In Pickerel Lake? Pigeon? Marquette? Mackinaw?)"	9:23
14.	"Redford (For Yia-Yia & Pappou)"	2:02
15.	"Vito's Ordination Song"	7:06
Total length:		65:58

Bonus tracks included on the double-disc vinyl release
No.	Title	Length
16.	"Marching Band"	3:41
17.	"Pickerel Lake"	3:11
18.	"Niagara Falls"	2:22
19.	"Presidents and Magistrates"	4:16
20.	"Wolverine"	2:10
Total length:		81:38

The vinyl release also includes alternate arrangements of "Vito's Ordination Song" and "Romulus".

The European re-release of the album in 2004 also contains the bonus tracks "Marching Band" and "Pickerel Lake".

== Personnel ==
- Sufjan Stevens – oboe, English horn, piano, electronic organ, electric piano, banjo, acoustic & electric guitar, bass, vibraphone, xylophone, glockenspiel, recorders, wood flute, whistles, drums, percussion, vocals, layout, art design, arrangement, mixing, production
- Monique Aiuto – vocals on "Detroit, Lift Up Your Weary Head! (Rebuild! Restore! Reconsider!)" and "Vito's Ordination Song"
- Vito Aiuto – vocals on "Vito's Ordination Song"
- Alan Douches – mastering at West Westside Studios in New Jersey
- Tom Eaton – trumpet on "Flint (For the Unemployed and Underpaid)", "For the Widows in Paradise, For the Fatherless in Ypsilanti", "Detroit, Lift Up Your Weary Head! (Rebuild! Restore! Reconsider!)", and "Vito's Ordination Song"
- Stephen Halker - trumpet on "Say Yes! To M!ch!gan!", "Detroit, Lift Up Your Weary Head! (Rebuild! Restore! Reconsider!)", "Oh God, Where Are You Now? (In Pickerel Lake? Pigeon? Marquette? Mackinaw?)", and "Marching Band"
- Laura Normandin – artwork
- John Ringhofer – trombone and vocals on "Oh God, Where Are You Now? (In Pickerel Lake? Pigeon? Marquette? Mackinaw?)"
- Daniel Smith – vocals on "Vito's Ordination Song"
- Elin Smith – vocals on "All Good Naysayers, Speak Up! Or Forever Hold Your Peace!", "For the Widows in Paradise, For the Fatherless in Ypsilanti", "Say Yes! to M!ch!gan!", "The Upper Peninsula", "Sleeping Bear, Sault Saint Marie", "They Also Mourn Who Do Not Wear Black (For the Homeless in Muskegon)", "Oh God, Where Are You Now? (In Pickerel Lake? Pigeon? Marquette? Mackinaw?)", and "Vito's Ordination Song"
- Megan Smith – vocals on "All Good Naysayers, Speak Up! Or Forever Hold Your Peace!", "The Upper Peninsula", "Detroit, Lift Up Your Weary Head! (Rebuild! Restore! Reconsider!)", "Sleeping Bear, Sault Saint Marie", "They Also Mourn Who Do Not Wear Black (For the Homeless in Muskegon)", and "Oh God, Where Are You Now? (In Pickerel Lake? Pigeon? Marquette? Mackinaw?)"
