= Timo Andres =

American composer (born 1985)

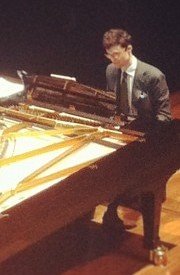
- Andres in 2014
- Born: Timothy Andres; 1985 (age 40–41)
- Education: Yale University
- Years active: 2009 - present
- Era: Contemporary
- Website: andres.com

Timo Andres (born Timothy Andres in 1985 in Palo Alto, California) is an American composer and pianist. He grew up in rural Connecticut and lives in Brooklyn, New York.

== Biography ==
After growing up in rural Connecticut, an environment that greatly influences his work, Andres attended Yale University for both his undergraduate and graduate education, studying with Martin Bresnick, Ingram Marshall, Aaron Jay Kernis, Christopher Theofanidis, John Halle, Matthew Suttor, Kathryn Alexander, Michael Klingbeil, and Orianna Webb. He was a member of Skull and Bones. He is also a graduate of Juilliard's pre-college program.

Andres first rose to prominence at age 24, when his piece Nightjar was commissioned and performed by the Los Angeles Philharmonic and John Adams. Since then, he has been commissioned by Wigmore Hall, Carnegie Hall, the Concertgebouw Amsterdam, San Francisco Performances, the Gilmore Foundation, and the Library of Congress. Andres has performed solo recitals at (Le) Poisson Rouge, Wigmore Hall, and Lincoln Center, and alongside artists such as Gabriel Kahane, Philip Glass, and David Kaplan.

In 2014, he performed with the Naumburg Orchestral Concerts, in the Naumburg Bandshell, Central Park, in the summer series.

== Works ==
Andres's work has received broad critical acclaim and is particularly noted for its seamless blend of traditional and contemporary idioms. Alex Ross of The New Yorker has called Andres "quietly awesome" and his music "the kind of sprawling, brazen work that a young composer should write."

Andres draws from a wide array of influences, including bands such as Sigur Rós, Boards of Canada, Brian Eno and Radiohead, as well as classical music by Brahms, Schumann, Mozart, and Charles Ives. He is also influenced by his love of design and typography.

Andres has repeatedly collaborated with Sufjan Stevens, including on the albums The Decalogue and Reflections. He arranged music from Stevens's 2005 album Illinois for a 2024 Broadway adaptation, Illinoise, for which he received a Tony Award nomination for Best Orchestrations.

== Compositions and projects ==
Chamber music

- 2004 Violin Sonata for violin and piano
- 2004 "Formal Conceits" for flute, clarinet, violin, ’cello, and piano
- 2006 "I Found it in the Woods" outdoor music for flute, viola, and harp
- 2006 "Strider" ambient music for vibraphone and piano
- 2006 "Five-Speed Automatic" fanfare for trumpet, horn, and trombone
- 2006 "The Night Jaunt" traveling music for flute, clarinet, electric guitar, bass, and piano
- 2007 "Play it by Ear" for clarinet, bassoon, horn, string quartet, bass, and piano (or clarinet and piano)
- 2007 "Talking About Dancing" for baroque violin, bass gamba, and harpsichord
- 2007 "I Found it by the Sea" variations for piano quartet
- 2008 "Some Connecticut Gospel" for flute (doubling alto), bassoon, trombone, piano, violin, viola, ’cello, and bass
- 2009 "Fast Flows the River" for ’cello and Hammond organ (or MIDI keyboard)
- 2009 "Crashing Through Fences" for piccolo, glockenspiel, and two kickdrums
- 2010 "Clamber Music" free variations for two violins and piano
- 2010 "Thrive on Routine" for string quartet
- 2010 "Trade Winds" for clarinet, string quartet, percussion, and piano
- 2011 "You broke it, you bought it" for percussion and electric guitar
- 2012 "Trade Secrets" for alto flute, percussion, violin, and ‘cello
- 2012 "Piano Quintet" for string quartet & piano
- 2013 "Safe Travels" for flute, clarinet, trumpet, violin, viola, and ‘cello
- 2013 "Early to Rise" for string quartet
- 2013 "Austerity Measures" for percussion quartet
- 2014 "Checkered Shade" for flute, clarinet, violin, ‘cello, percussion, and piano
- 2014 "Inner Circle" for flute, clarinet, and marimba
- 2014 "Mooring" for piano quartet
- 2015 "Strong Language" for string quartet
- 2015 "Words Fail" for violin and piano
- 2016 "Tides and Currents" for two pianos and two percussionists
- 2016 "Land Lines" for triple brass quintet
- 2017 "Steady Gaze" for flute and piano
- 2017 "Listen to the radio a lot" for snare drum and electronics
- 2018 "Piano Trio" for violin, cello, and piano

Keyboard Music

- 2007 "Shy and Mighty" album for two pianos
- 2007 "How can I live in your world of ideas?" for solo piano
- 2007 "Sorbet" for solo piano
- 2010 "It takes a long time to become a good composer" for solo piano
- 2011 "At the River" for solo piano
- 2011 "Retro Music" for piano four-hands
- 2012 "Old Friend" for solo piano
- 2013 "Clear and Cold" for solo piano
- 2013 "Heavy Sleep" for solo piano
- 2016 "Zefiro Torna" paraphrase for solo piano
- 2017 "Wise Words" for solo piano
- 2017 "Old Ground" for solo piano
- 2017 "Moving Études" for solo piano

Large Ensemble

- 2008 "Senior" for string quartet and orchestra
- 2008 "Nightjar" for chamber orchestra
- 2008 "Home Stretch" concerto for piano and chamber orchestra
- 2009 "Bathtub Shrine" elegy for full orchestra
- 2010 "Paraphrase on themes of Brian Eno" for chamber orchestra
- 2010 "How to Pop and Lock in Thirteen Steps" for chamber orchestra
- 2011 "Old Keys" concerto for piano and small orchestra
- 2014 "Word of Mouth" for chamber orchestra
- 2015 "Running Theme" for string orchestra
- 2015 "The Blind Banister" concerto for piano and orchestra
- 2016 "Everything Happens So Much" for full orchestra
- 2017 "Steady Hand" for two pianos and chamber orchestra
- 2017 "Upstate Obscura" for cello and chamber orchestra

Vocal

- 2010 "Family Plays" for high male voice and piano
- 2010 "Are your fingers long enough?" for female voice, double bass, and looping pedal
- 2011 "Two River Songs" for baritone, violin, and piano
- 2011 "Comfort Food" for women’s chorus and mixed nonet
- 2013 "Work Songs" for three voices, two guitars, keyboard, accordion, and piano
- 2015 "Schubertiana" for mezzo-soprano, viola, horn, and piano
- 2015 "Mirror Songs" for male voice and piano

Others

- 2010 "Mozart Coronation Concerto re-composition" for piano and orchestra
- 2011 "Scores for Jonathan Ehrenberg’s Moth and Seed" for piano and electronics
- 2011 "Frank Tell project" for violin and electronics
- 2012 "Histories" for l’histoire ensemble
- 2015 "Requiem" for chorus and orchestra
- 2015 "Small Wonder" for solo cello
- 2019 The Decalogue an album by Timo and Sufjan Stevens

== Awards ==
- 2004 BMI Student Composer Award
- 2008 Charles Ives Prize
- 2013 Morton Gould Young Composer Award
- 2013 Music Alive Residency Award
- 2016 Pulitzer Prize finalist in music
- 2016 Glenn Gould Protege Prize

== Recordings ==
- 2010 – "Shy and Mighty" (Nonesuch) with David Kaplan, piano
- 2013 – "Home Stretch" (Nonesuch) with Metropolis Ensemble and Andrew Cyr
- 2019 – "Work Songs" (New Amsterdam) with Becca Stevens, Gabriel Kahane, Ted Hearne, Nathan Koci, and Taylor Levine
- 2019 – The Decalogue, with Sufjan Stevens
- 2023 – Reflections, with Conor Hanick and Sufjan Stevens
- 2024 – The Blind Banister (Nonesuch), with Metropolis Ensemble and Andrew Cyr
