= Shannon Stephens =

American musician

Shannon Stephens is an American singer-songwriter from Seattle, Washington.

She has released three solo albums, an EP entitled How I Got Away (1999), and also has exclusive tracks featured on both Asthmatic Kitty Records Samplers. Stephens was also featured on a bonus track of Denison Witmer's 2002 release titled Philadelphia Songs on "Burnt Toast Vinyl" (US).

Stephens was the lead singer in the Holland, Michigan band Marzuki that featured Sufjan Stevens on the guitar, drums, and recorder. The band released two albums, one titled Marzuki (MS Records, 1996) and a second titled No One Likes a Nervous Wreck (MS Records, 1998). Several of her old band members including Paul Mumaw (Rockstar Crush), Jason Harrod, Kenny Hutson (Vigilantes of Love) and Sufjan Stevens appeared on her self-titled release.

After the release of her first album, she went on an eight-year hiatus before releasing a follow-up, The Breadwinner in 2009, which was noted internationally. It featured the single In Summer in the Heat. In May 2012 her third album was released, Pull it Together.

The song "I'll Be Glad" from her first album was covered by Bonnie 'Prince' Billy on his 2008 release, Lie Down in the Light.

== Discography ==
- Shannon Stephens (independent)
  1. "So Gentle Your Arms"
  2. "Panic"
  3. "Months"
  4. "I Want to Be Your Friend"
  5. "Deliverance"
  6. "I Don't Want to Go"
  7. "Welcome to New York"
  8. "Air So Thick"
  9. "Army of Seven o'Clock"
  10. "Catch the Morning Line"
  11. "Arrows"
  12. "I'll Be Glad"/"Arrows" (reprise)
- How I Got Away (independent, 1999)
  1. "The Way Relationships End Up"
  2. "Catch the Morning Line"
  3. "Air So Thick"
  4. "Months"
  5. "You Can't Be Happy Without Me"
- Shannon Stephens (Asthmatic Kitty Records, re-release 2010)
- The Breadwinner (Asthmatic Kitty Records, 2009)
- Pull It Together (Asthmatic Kitty Records, 2012)

== MP3's ==
- "Catch the Morning Line" from How I Got Away
- "Air So Thick" from How I Got Away

== See also ==
- Marzuki
