= Jason Harrod =

American guitarist and singer

- Origin: North Carolina, United States
- Genres: Folk, bluegrass
- Instrument(s): guitar, harmonica
- Years active: 1992–present
- Website: http://jasonharrod.com

Jason Harrod is an American guitarist and singer who writes and performs bluegrass/folk music. Harrod's first album, Dreams of the Colorblind, was released in 1992. Harrod's first album was coreleased with songwriter Brian Funck, with whom he played until 1998 after meeting as students at Wheaton College. The pair released three CDs, with their first studio CD (produced by Mark Heard) making it to number 38 on the CMJ AAA top 40 chart. The pair broke up in 1998, and only Harrod continued in the music industry. Since then, Harrod has released three albums, and has won several bluegrass/folk competitions, including the Chris Austin Songwriting competition in 2000. Harrod continues to write music. He also continues to perform concerts around the country.

== Discography ==
=== Solo ===
- Living in Skin (2000)
- Bright As You (2005)
- Highliner (2013)
- Highliner Acoustic (2014)

=== Singles and EPs ===
- Christmas Hymns (2010)
- Out in the Fields (2015)

=== Harrod and Funck ===
- Dreams of the Color Blind (1992)
- Harrod And Funck (1997)
- Live (1998)
