= Asthmatic Kitty =

American independent record label

Asthmatic Kitty Records
- Founded: 1999
- Founder: Sufjan Stevens; Lowell Brams
- Genre: Indie rock
- Country of origin: United States
- Location: Bloomington, Indiana
- Official website: asthmatickitty.com

Asthmatic Kitty Records is an American independent record label founded in 1999 by a community of musicians from Holland, Michigan led by Sufjan Stevens and his stepfather Lowell Brams. Asthmatic Kitty is now based across the United States, United Kingdom, and Canada with a primary business address in Bloomington, Indiana.

The label's name refers to Sara, a stray with feline asthma adopted by Lowell in 1994. From 2002 on, she lived in Lander, Wyoming (elevation 5,358 ft / 1,633 m), where the thin, dry air alleviated most of her asthma symptoms. Sara died in December 2008, aged fifteen or sixteen years old.

Between 2007 and 2010, Unusual Animals was a special series of limited-edition vinyl releases, parties, artist showcases, and music events. In 2007, the Unusual Animals Project Space founded by Michael Kaufmann at the Harrison Center for the Arts in Indianapolis featured exhibitions by Cindy Hinant and Stuart Snoddy.

Launched in 2009, the Library Catalog Music Series publishes instrumental music by a variety of artists for personal and commercial use.

In 2020, Sufjan Stevens and Lowell Brams released Aporia, a 21-track album. The album has been described as "mixing organic instrumentation with experimental electronics, intertwining both new age and ambient music."

== Active artists ==
- James McAlister 900X
- Angelo De Augustine
- Denison Witmer
- Half-handed Cloud
- Sisyphus
- Sufjan Stevens
- The Welcome Wagon

== Former artists and alumni ==
- Cecile Believe
- Castanets
- Cryptacize
- DM Stith
- Dots Will Echo
- Epstein
- Fol Chen
- Helado Negro
- Hermas Zopoula
- I Heart Lung
- Jookabox
- Julianna Barwick
- Land of a Thousand Rappers
- Lily & Madeleine
- Liz Janes
- My Brightest Diamond
- Ombre
- Osso String Quartet
- Linda Perhacs
- Pepe Deluxé
- Rafter
- Raymond Byron and the White Freighter
- Roberts and Lord
- Royal City
- Chris Schlarb
- Shannon Stephens
- Shapes and Sizes
- The Curtains
- Trumans Water

== See also ==
- List of record labels
