= Illinoise =

2023 stage musical

- A New Musical
- Broadway windowcard
- Music: Sufjan Stevens
- Lyrics: Sufjan Stevens
- Book: Justin Peck; Jackie Sibblies Drury
- Basis: Illinois by Sufjan Stevens
- Premiere: June 23, 2023: Fisher Center
- Productions: 2023 Bard College; 2024 Chicago; 2024 Off-Broadway; 2024 Broadway

Illinoise is a 2023 dance revue musical with music and lyrics by Sufjan Stevens and an original story by Justin Peck and Jackie Sibblies Drury. The musical was inspired by Stevens' 2005 album Illinois. The musical follows a young man who joins a group of friends telling stories around a campfire about their childhoods and growing up in Illinois.

After a summer festival premiere, regional production and off-Broadway tryout, the show played on Broadway from April to August 2024 at the St. James Theatre; these productions have all been directed and choreographed by Peck. Reviews on Broadway were generally positive, and Illinoise was nominated for four Tony Awards in 2025, including Best Musical, winning one for Peck's choreography.

== Synopsis ==
=== Prologue and act I ===
A young man named Henry leaves his bed and partner in the middle of the night ("Prologue (or, A Conjunction of Drones...)") and hikes into the woods. He thinks about three of the most important people in his life ("Three Stars (or, Concerning the UFO Sighting near Highland, Illinois)"). Henry reaches a clearing in an Illinois cornfield ("The Long Hike") where a group of friends are sitting around a campfire telling stories about their childhoods and lives. He is given a notebook like the others' and encouraged to "write from the heart" ("Come on! Feel the Illinoise!").

The storytelling begins: Morgan reminisces about growing up in Jackson, Illinois, and her attempts to understand her lineage and the lessons left by those who came before ("A Story About Jackson"). Jo Daviess relates her worries about the hold the Founding Fathers have on the American imagination, and the dangers of racism and conservatism ("a story about Zombies"). Wayne has been dealing with feelings of self-loathing about their sexuality and reflects how, as an outcast, they hide the truth about themselves, fearing that they are no better than Illinois serial killer John Wayne Gacy ("a story about John Wayne Gacy, Jr"). Wayne eventually breaks down in tears and is comforted by the other members of the group. To lighten the mood, Clark talks about how he is a vulnerable Superman ("a story about The Man of Metropolis").

=== Act II ===
At first, Henry resists telling his story but is emboldened by the willingness of his new friends to share their feelings of vulnerability. His story comes alive as he relates that his childhood best friend and first love, Carl, had a lover named Shelby, and the three were close friends ("Decatur"). He and Carl embark on a road trip, passing through Chicago and ending abruptly in New York, when Carl receives news that Shelby is ill ("Chicago"). Carl returns to Decatur to be with her, but Henry meets and falls in love with Douglas, an artist ("To the Workers of the Rock River Valley Region, I Have an Idea Concerning Your Predicament"). Shelby soon dies of cancer, with Carl at her side ("Casimir Pulaski Day").

Meanwhile, Henry is still together with Douglas, and while the two are very much in love, Henry is tormented by the idea that he has done something terrible by leaving Carl ("The Predatory Wasp of the Palisades Is Out to Get Us!"). Douglas is able to calm Henry, and the two fall back to sleep. Carl struggles with having lost the love of his life ("In This Temple as in the Hearts of Man for Whom He Saved the Earth") and, feeling he is unable to confide in Henry, commits suicide ("The Seer's Tower"). Henry is devastated by the loss of Carl, and, returning to the near-present, Henry leaves Douglas in bed and finds these new friends ("A Conjunction of Drones, again").

=== Act III ===
Henry realizes that he cannot spend the rest of his life dwelling on the end of his friendship with Carl but must celebrate the good things about it as well. Henry is overjoyed when Douglas arrives at the campfire having hiked there to find him ("Chicago" (reprise)). Henry's new friends and Douglas celebrate his bravery for telling his story and accepting his emotions ("The Tallest Man, the Broadest Shoulders"). Henry and Douglas embrace as the celebration of storytelling continues ("Epilogue").

== Production history ==
=== Early productions (2023–2024) ===
The musical, originally titled Illinois, premiered at the Fisher Center at Bard College, running from June 23 until July 2, 2023, during the Bard SummerScape. Direction and choreography were by Justin Peck.

The show, now titled Illinoise, was next staged at the Chicago Shakespeare Theater from January 28 to February 18, 2024; Peck continued as director and choreographer. It opened in New York off-Broadway at the Park Avenue Armory on March 2, 2024, and closed on March 26, 2024, again with Peck at the helm. Orchestrations were by Timo Andres.

=== Broadway (2024) ===
The production transferred to the St. James Theatre on Broadway on April 24, 2024, for a limited engagement through August 10, 2024, running for 117 performances. Peck directed and choreographed; set design was by Adam Rigg, with lighting by Brandon Stirling Baker and costumes by Reid Bartelme and Harriet Jung. The production received four nominations at the 77th Tony Awards, including Best Musical, winning one for Best Choreography for Peck.

== Cast and characters ==
Character	Chicago	Off-Broadway	Broadway
Character	2023	2024	
Clark	Robert Fairchild	Robert Fairchild	Brandt Martinez
Henry	Ricky Ubeda	Ricky Ubeda	Ricky Ubeda
Jo Daviess	Jeanette Delgado	Jeanette Delgado	Jeanette Delgado
Shelby	Gaby Diaz	Gaby Diaz	Gaby Diaz
Marion	Kara Chan	Kara Chan	Kara Chan
Douglas	Ahmad Simmons	Ahmad Simmons	Ahmad Simmons
Cass	Byron Tittle	Byron Tittle	Byron Tittle
Morgan	Rachel Lockhart	Rachel Lockhart	Rachel Lockhart
Boone	Craig Salstein	Craig Salstein	Craig Salstein
Carl	Ben Cook	Ben Cook	Ben Cook
Wayne	Alejandro Vargas	Alejandro Vargas	Alejandro Vargas
Knox	Christine Flores	Christine Flores	Christine Flores
Barsine (vocalist)	Shara Nova	Shara Nova	Shara Nova
Nacna (vocalist)	Tasha	Tasha	Tasha
Arctiini (vocalist)	Elijah Lyons	Elijah Lyons	Elijah Lyons

Characters are named after counties in Illinois, and the vocalists are named after moth classifications, Barsine, Nacna and Arctiini, and costumed to represent moths.

== Musical numbers ==
- "Prologue (or, A Conjuction of Drones...)"

Act I

- "Three Stars (or, Concerning the UFO Sighting near Highland, Illinois)"
- "The Long Hike"
- "Come On! Feel the Illinoise!"
- "a story about Jacksonville"
- "a story about Zombies"
- "a story about John Wayne Gacy, Jr."
- "a story about The Man of Metropolis"

Act II

- "Decatur"
- "Chicago"
- "To the Workers of the Rock River Valley Region, I Have an Idea Concerning Your Predicament"
- "Casimir Pulaski Day"
- "Prairie Fire That Wanders About"
- "The Predatory Wasp of the Palisades Is Out to Get Us!"
- "In This Temple as in the Hearts of Man for Whom He Saved the Earth"
- "The Seer's Tower"
- "A Conjunction of Drones, again"

Act III

- "Chicago" (reprise)
- "The Tallest Man, the Broadest Shoulders"
- "Epilogue"

== Critical reception ==
The Broadway production was praised by the reviewers of the Chicago Tribune, The Hollywood Reporter, Variety and several others. A reviewer from TheWrap, however, thought that the production was "not only sentimental but downright whimsical" and "precious", and criticized the choreography as displaying "a limited dance vocabulary". The New York Times reviewers were split, with Jesse Green calling Illinoise "unforgettable" but Gia Kourlas stating that the show was "a place of overflowing emotion, but little dance spirit".

== Awards and nominations ==
Year	Award	Category	Nominee	Result
2024	Tony Awards	Best Musical		Nominated
2024	Tony Awards	Best Lighting Design of a Musical	Brandon Stirling Baker	Nominated
2024	Tony Awards	Best Choreography	Justin Peck	Won
2024	Tony Awards	Best Orchestrations	Timo Andres	Nominated
2024	Drama League Awards	Outstanding Production of a Musical		Nominated
2024	Outer Critics Circle Awards	Outstanding New Off-Broadway Musical		Nominated
2024	Outer Critics Circle Awards	Outstanding Lead Performer in an Off-Broadway Musical	Ricky Ubeda	Nominated
2024	Outer Critics Circle Awards	Outstanding Featured Performer in an Off-Broadway Musical	Ben Cook	Nominated
2024	Outer Critics Circle Awards	Outstanding Book of a Musical	Justin Peck and Jackie Sibblies Drury	Nominated
2024	Outer Critics Circle Awards	Outstanding Orchestrations	Timo Andres	Nominated
2024	Outer Critics Circle Awards	Outstanding Choreography	Justin Peck	Won
2024	Drama Desk Awards	Outstanding Musical		Nominated
2024	Drama Desk Awards	Outstanding Lead Performance in a Musical	Ricky Ubeda	Nominated
2024	Drama Desk Awards	Outstanding Choreography	Justin Peck	Won
2024	Drama Desk Awards	Outstanding Orchestrations	Timo Andres	Nominated
2024	Chita Rivera Awards	Outstanding Choreography in a Broadway Show	Justin Peck	Nominated
2024	Chita Rivera Awards	Outstanding Ensemble in a Broadway Show		Won
2024	Chita Rivera Awards	Outstanding Dancer in a Broadway Show	Ben Cook	Nominated
2024	Chita Rivera Awards	Outstanding Dancer in a Broadway Show	Gaby Diaz	Nominated
2024	Chita Rivera Awards	Outstanding Dancer in a Broadway Show	Rachel Lockhart	Nominated
2024	Chita Rivera Awards	Outstanding Dancer in a Broadway Show	Byron Tittle	Nominated
2024	Chita Rivera Awards	Outstanding Dancer in a Broadway Show	Ricky Ubeda	Nominated

== See also ==
- Movin' Out, another musical focusing on a series of dances linked by a thin plot, with all the vocals performed by a pianist and band, while the dancers act out the lyrics; it was created by Twyla Tharp.
