= Black Hawk War (disambiguation) =

The Black Hawk War was a war fought in 1832 in the Midwestern United States of Sauk and Fox Indians versus the United States Army and Illinois militia.

Black Hawk War may also refer to:

- Black Hawk War (1865–1872), a conflict between Mormon settlers and Native American tribes in Utah
- "The Black Hawk War", a song by Sufjan Stevens from Illinois
