= Castabala =

Castabala may refer to:

- Castabala (city), or Hierapolis (ad Pyram), in modern Turkey, an Ancient former city and bishopric in Cilicia, presently a Latin Catholic titular bishopric
- Castabala, a genus of insects currently considered synonymous with Barsine
