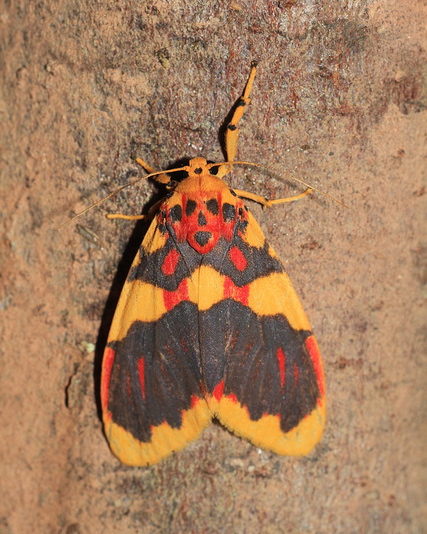

Scientific classification
- Domain: Eukaryota
- Kingdom: Animalia
- Phylum: Arthropoda
- Class: Insecta
- Order: Lepidoptera
- Superfamily: Noctuoidea
- Family: Erebidae
- Subfamily: Arctiinae
- Genus: Barsine
- Species: B. rubricostata

Binomial name
- Barsine rubricostata (Herrich-Schäffer, 1855)

Synonyms
- Hypocrita rubricostata Herrich-Schäffer, [1855]; Hypoprepia rubrigutta Walker, 1862; Miltochrista rubricostata Herrich-Schaffer; Holloway, 1976

= Barsine rubricostata =

Species of moth

Barsine rubricostata is a species of moth of the family Erebidae, subfamily Arctiinae. It is found in Peninsular Malaysia, Sumatra, Borneo. This is a generally rare species ranging from the lowlands to 1,790 meters.
