= The Avalanche (Sufjan Stevens album) =

Album by Sufjan Stevens

Compilation album by Sufjan Stevens
- Released: July 11, 2006
- Recorded: Late 2004, Late 2005 to January 2006
- Genres: Art rock; folk pop; adult contemporary
- Length: 75:50
- Label: Asthmatic Kitty
- Producer: Sufjan Stevens

Sufjan Stevens chronology
Illinois (2005)	The Avalanche (2006)	Songs for Christmas (2006)

The Avalanche (styled The Avalanche: Outtakes and Extras from the Illinois Album! on the cover) is a 2006 compilation album by indie rock singer/songwriter Sufjan Stevens, consisting of outtakes and other recordings from the sessions for his album Illinois, released the previous year. The title song "The Avalanche" was also a bonus track on the Illinois vinyl and iTunes release.

== Recording and release ==
A press release on the Asthmatic Kitty website reported that the Illinois album was supposed to be a double record (with somewhere near 50 songs), but the idea was eventually scrapped. After the success of the album, Stevens returned to his digital 8-track recorder in late 2005 and began the process of finishing 21 of the previously abandoned songs, which would eventually become The Avalanche.

Stevens has stated during interviews that although he doesn't like The Avalanche as much as Illinois, he felt it was important to release the songs in light of the success of his most recent album. He has also said that he decided to release the album in order to buy time until his next "50 States project" release. The album cover jokingly makes reference to the partially commercial reasons for the album's release, declaring that its contents were "shamelessly compiled by Sufjan Stevens".

In May 2006, Pitchfork was given permission to distribute the second track from The Avalanche, titled "Dear Mr. Supercomputer", on their website in MP3 format. The whole album was leaked to the Internet on May 9, 2006.

The track "No Man's Land" plays during the closing credits to the 2006 film Little Miss Sunshine, which also features "Chicago" by Sufjan Stevens. The track "The Perpetual Self, or 'What Would Saul Alinsky Do?'" plays during the trailer for the film Babies.

== Reception ==
Professional ratings
Aggregate scores
Source	Rating
Metacritic	76/100
Review scores
Source	Rating
AllMusic	3.5/5 stars
The A.V. Club	B+
Drowned in Sound	7/10
Entertainment Weekly	A−
The Guardian	4/5 stars
Pitchfork	7.2/10
PopMatters	8/10
Slant Magazine	4.5/5 stars
Spin	3.5/5 stars
Stylus	B−

The album ranked 9th on both Almost Cool's Best of 2006 and on Uncut's Best of 2006. The album made several other Best of 2006 lists.

=== Sales chart history ===
The album debuted at number 71 on the Billboard Top 200 and fell off the chart two weeks later.

== Artwork ==
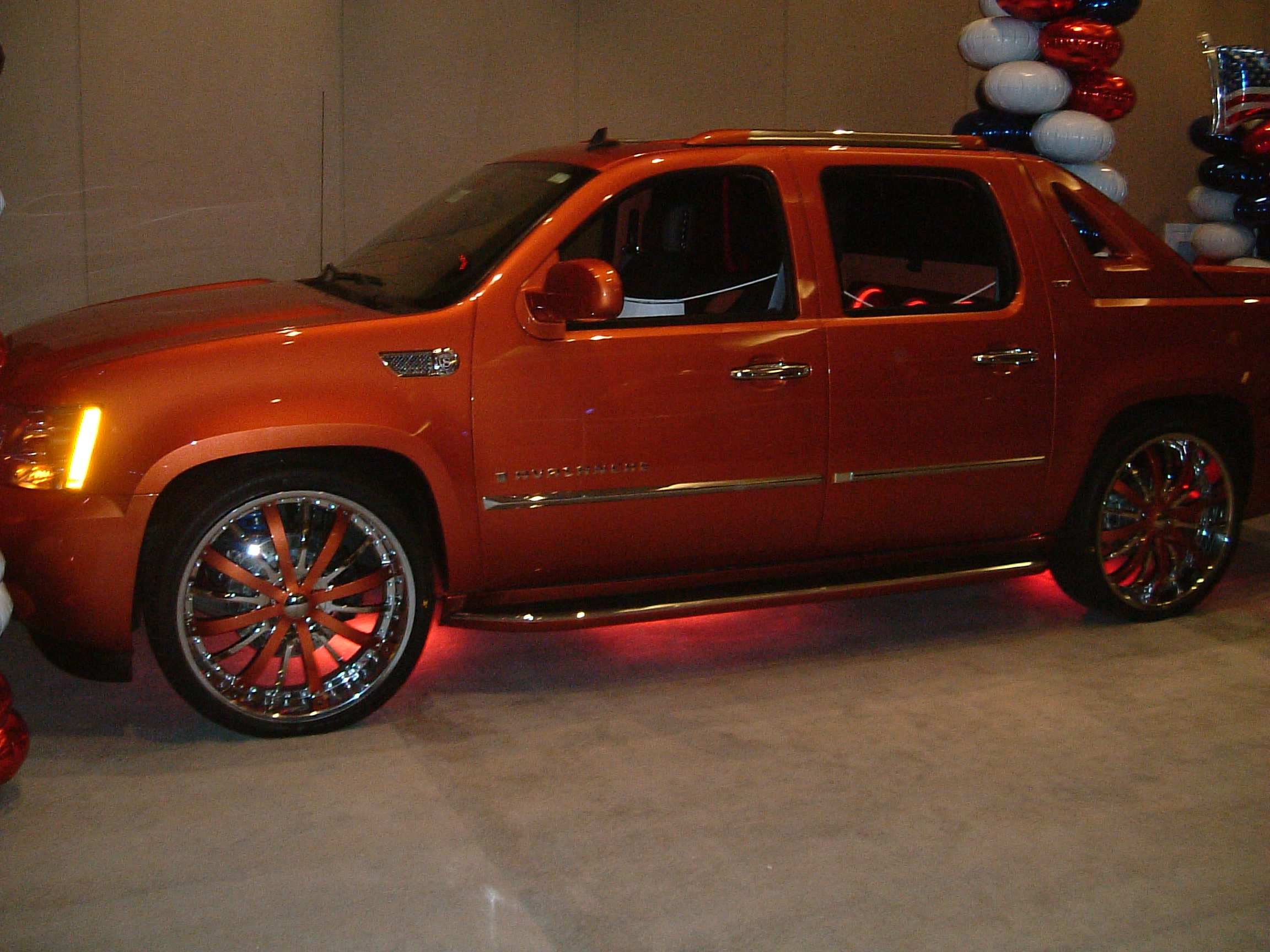
Stevens leaps in front of a Chevy Avalanche on the cover drawing

The cover features a cartoon depiction of Stevens wearing a cape and costume held aloft by strings, a likely reference to the image of Superman he was forced to remove from the cover of Illinois. He wears a shirt with a Block-type Serif letter I; the symbol of varsity athletics at the University of Illinois Urbana-Champaign. The "Block I" appears several times in the album art. A Chevrolet Avalanche is featured on the cover, with an old-style Illinois License Plate which reads, "AKR 022", a reference to the catalog number of the album on Asthmatic Kitty Records. The license plate of the police car in the liner notes illustration reads "A NO NO". This is possibly a reference to the first track of the album Tell Another Joke at the Ol' Choppin' Block by the Danielson Famile. Sufjan is an honorary member of the Famile.

== Track listing ==
1. "The Avalanche" – 3:14
2. "Dear Mr. Supercomputer" – 4:20
3. "Adlai Stevenson" – 2:34
4. "The Vivian Girls Are Visited in the Night by Saint Dargarius and His Squadron of Benevolent Butterflies" – 1:49
5. "Chicago" (Acoustic Version) – 4:40
6. "The Henney Buggy Band" – 3:16
7. "Saul Bellow" – 2:53
8. "Carlyle Lake" – 3:15
9. "Springfield, or Bobby Got a Shadfly Caught in His Hair" – 4:17
10. "The Mistress Witch from McClure (or, The Mind That Knows Itself)" – 3:24
11. "Kaskaskia River" – 2:14
12. "Chicago" (Adult Contemporary Easy Listening Version) – 6:06
13. "Inaugural Pop Music for Jane Margaret Byrne" – 1:25
14. "No Man's Land" – 4:45
15. "The Palm Sunday Tornado Hits Crystal Lake" – 1:38
16. "The Pick-Up" – 3:27
17. "The Perpetual Self, or "What Would Saul Alinsky Do?"" – 2:24
18. "For Clyde Tombaugh" – 3:43
19. "Chicago" (Multiple Personality Disorder Version) – 4:34
20. "Pittsfield" – 6:53
21. "The Undivided Self (for Eppie and Popo)" – 4:59

== Thematic elements ==
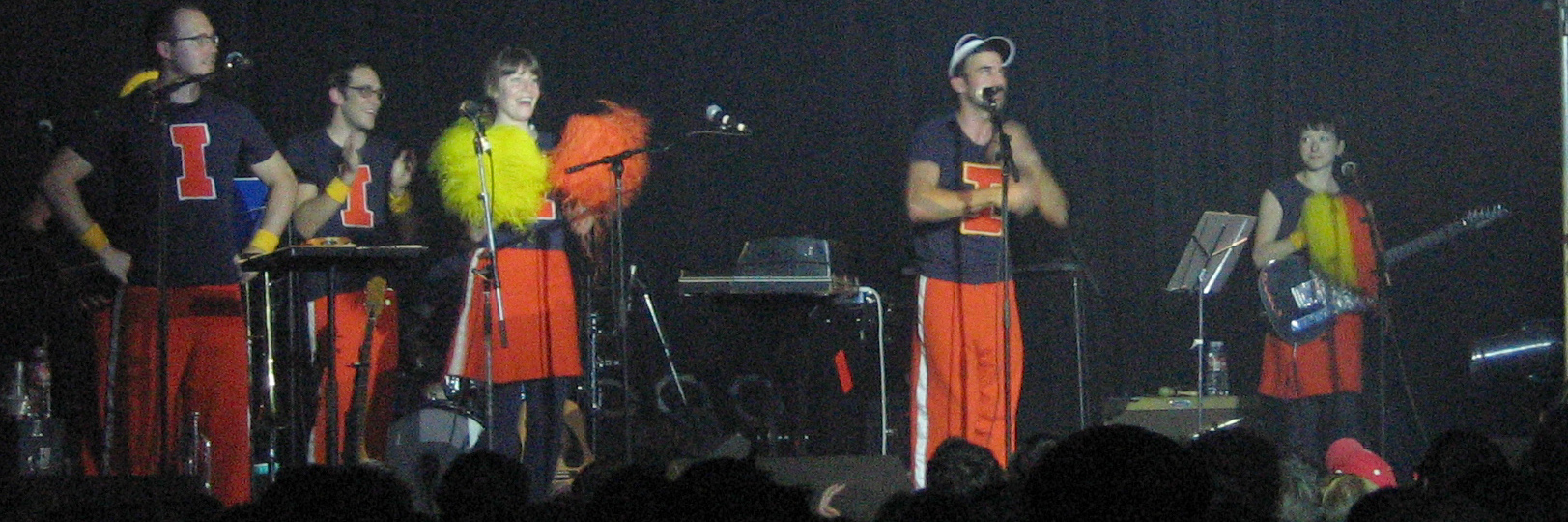
Stevens and band toured dressed in Block I Fighting Illini cheerleading gear

As a pseudo-sequel to Illinois, this album follows the theme of Stevens' "fifty states" project: one album for each constituent state of the United States of America. Explicit and implicit references are made to Illinois persons, places, and institutions throughout the songs.

=== Other references ===
Stevens alludes to "You Never Give Me Your Money" from the 1969 Beatles album Abbey Road in "Dear Mr. Supercomputer". The original line is "One two three four five six seven / All good children go to heaven." Stevens' lyric is "One two three four five six seven / All computers go to heaven."

== Personnel ==
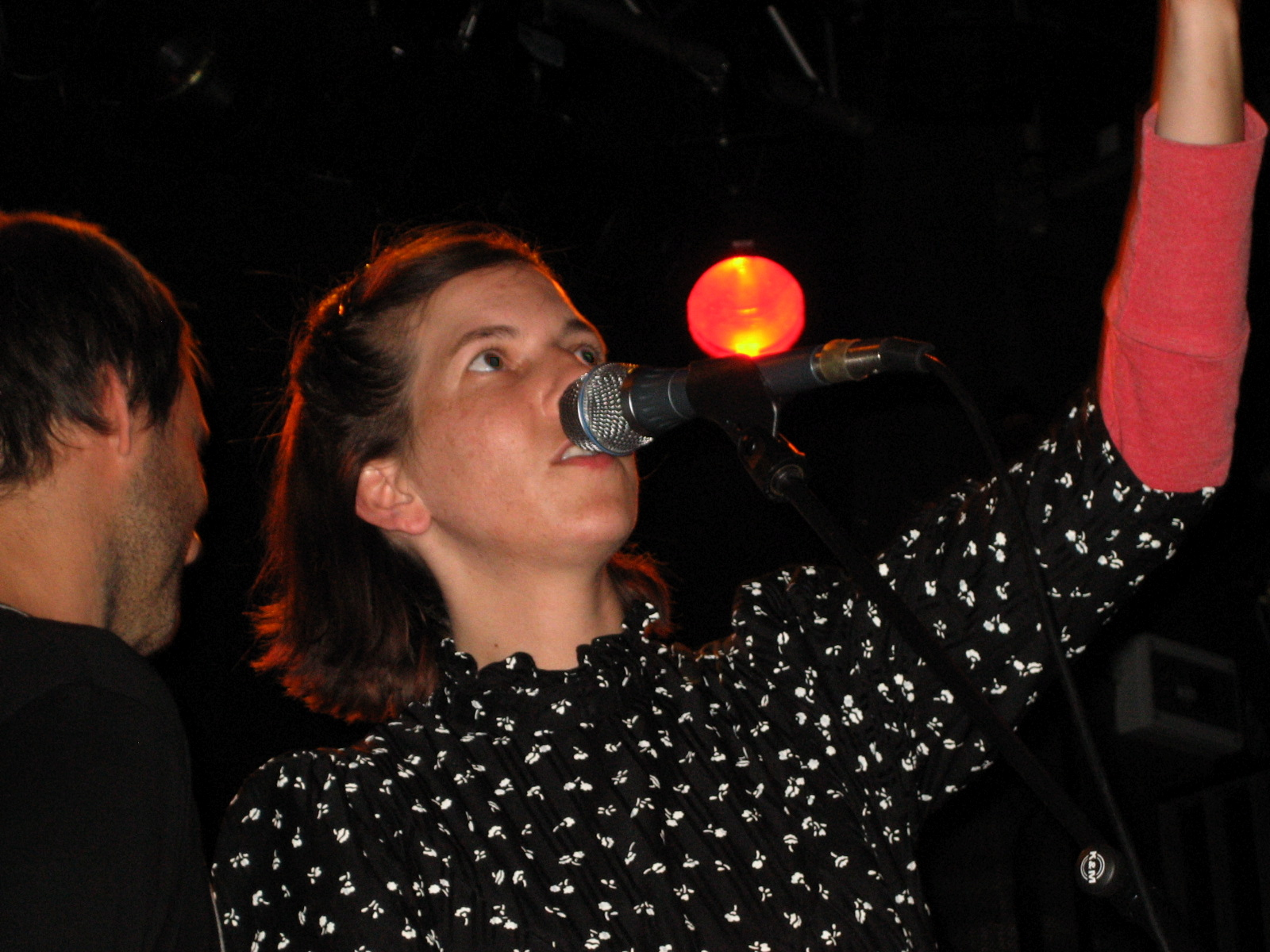
Although Stevens plays most of the music on the album, he invited several friends to guest, such as Rosie Thomas

- Sufjan Stevens – acoustic guitar, piano, Wurlitzer, bass guitar, drums, electric guitar, oboe, alto saxophone, flute, banjo, glockenspiel, accordion, vibraphone, alto recorder, Casiotone MT-70, sleigh bells, shaker, tambourine, triangle, electronic organ, vocals, arrangement, engineering, recording, production, photography, art direction, artwork
- Lowell Brams – artwork
- Alan Douches – mastering at West West Side Music, Tenafly, New Jersey
- Brian Dulaney – artwork
- Stephen Halker – artwork
- Katrina Kerns – backing vocals on "The Avalanche", "Dear Mr. Supercomputer", "Carlyle Lake", "Springfield", "The Mistress Witch from McClure", "No Man's Land", and "Chicago" (Adult Contemporary Easy Listening Version)
- James McAlister – drums, percussion, and drum engineering on "Dear Mr. Supercomputer", "The Henney Buggy Band", "Springfield", "Chicago" (Adult Contemporary Easy Listening Version), "Inaugural Pop Music for Jane Margaret Bryne", "No Man's Land", and "Chicago" (Multiple Personality Disorder Version)
- Craig Montoro – trumpet on "Dear Mr. Supercomputer", "The Henney Buggy Band", "The Mistress Witch from McClure", "Chicago" (Adult Contemporary Easy Listening Version)", "No Man's Land", "Chicago" (Multiple Personality Disorder Version), and "Pittsfield"; backing vocals on "Chicago" (Multiple Personality Disorder Version)
- Denny Renshaw – photography
- Divya Srinivasan – artwork
- Djohariah Stevens – artwork
- Marzuki Stevens – artwork
- Rosie Thomas – backing vocals on "Adlai Stevenson", "Saul Bellow", "The Henny Buggy Band", "Chicago" (Acoustic Version), "The Mistress Witch from McClure", "No Man's Land", "The Pick-Up", "The Perpetual Self", "Chicago" (Multiple Personality Disorder Version), and "Pittsfield"
- Shara Nova – backing vocals on "The Avalanche", "Dear Mr. Supercomputer", "Carlyle Lake", and "Chicago" (Adult Contemporary Easy Listening Version)

== Charts ==
Chart performance for The Avalanche
Chart (2006)	Peak position
Australian Albums (ARIA)	97
Belgian Albums (Ultratop Flanders)	68
French Albums (SNEP)	161
UK Albums (Official Charts)	84
US Billboard 200	71
US Independent Albums (Billboard)	4
UK Independent Albums (Official Charts)	6
Scottish Albums (Official Charts)	90
