= Barsine pretiosa =

Scientific classification
- Domain: Eukaryota
- Kingdom: Animalia
- Phylum: Arthropoda
- Class: Insecta
- Order: Lepidoptera
- Superfamily: Noctuoidea
- Family: Erebidae
- Subfamily: Arctiinae
- Genus: Barsine
- Species: B. pretiosa

Binomial name
- Barsine pretiosa Moore, 1879

Species of moth

Barsine pretiosa is a moth of the family Erebidae. It was described by Frederic Moore in 1879. It is found in India.
