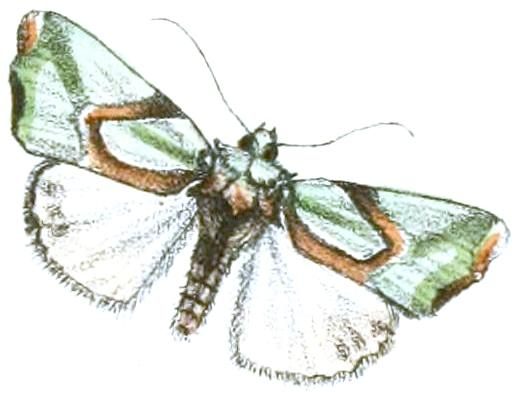

Scientific classification
- Domain: Eukaryota
- Kingdom: Animalia
- Phylum: Arthropoda
- Class: Insecta
- Order: Lepidoptera
- Superfamily: Noctuoidea
- Family: Noctuidae
- Genus: Nacna
- Species: N. pulchripicta

Binomial name
- Nacna pulchripicta (Moore, 1867)

Synonyms
- Canna pulchripicta Moore, 1867

= Nacna pulchripicta =

Species of moth

Nacna pulchripicta is a species of moth of the family Noctuidae. It is found in India.
