= Barsine flammealis =

Scientific classification
- Domain: Eukaryota
- Kingdom: Animalia
- Phylum: Arthropoda
- Class: Insecta
- Order: Lepidoptera
- Superfamily: Noctuoidea
- Family: Erebidae
- Subfamily: Arctiinae
- Genus: Barsine
- Species: B. flammealis

Binomial name
- Barsine flammealis Moore, 1878

Species of moth

Barsine flammealis is a moth of the family Erebidae. It was described by Frederic Moore in 1878. It is found in China, India and Nepal.
