= Barsine hololeuca =

Scientific classification
- Kingdom: Animalia
- Phylum: Arthropoda
- Class: Insecta
- Order: Lepidoptera
- Superfamily: Noctuoidea
- Family: Erebidae
- Subfamily: Arctiinae
- Tribe: Lithosiini
- Subtribe: Nudariina
- Genus: Barsine
- Species: B. hololeuca

Binomial name
- Barsine hololeuca (Hampson, 1895)

Synonyms
- Miltochrista hololeuca Hampson, 1895

Species of moth

Barsine hololeuca is a species of moth in the family Erebidae. It is found in Bhutan.
