= Illinois (Sufjan Stevens album) =

2005 album by Sufjan Stevens

- The original cover of Illinois, with Superman visible

Studio album by Sufjan Stevens
- Released: July 4, 2005
- Recorded: Late 2004 – early 2005
- Studios: The Buddy Project, Astoria, Queens, New York City, United States as well as various locations in and around New York City
- Genres: Indie folk; chamber folk; indie rock
- Length: 73:59
- Labels: Asthmatic Kitty/Secretly Canadian and Rough Trade
- Producer: Sufjan Stevens

Sufjan Stevens chronology
Seven Swans (2004)	Illinois (2005)	The Avalanche (2006)

Sufjan Stevens studio album chronology
Seven Swans (2004)	Illinois (2005)	The Age of Adz (2010)

Illinois (styled Sufjan Stevens invites you to: Come on feel the Illinoise on the cover; sometimes spelled as Illinoise) is the fifth studio album by the American singer-songwriter Sufjan Stevens. It features songs referencing places, events, and persons related to the U.S. state of Illinois. Illinois is Stevens' second based on a U.S. state—part of a planned series of fifty that began with the 2003 album Michigan and that Stevens has since acknowledged was a joke. It was adapted into a musical, Illinoise, in 2023 and, after playing smaller venues, opened at the St. James Theatre on Broadway and was nominated for four Tony Awards in 2024, winning for Best Choreography.

Stevens recorded and produced the album at multiple venues in New York City using low-fidelity studio equipment and a variety of instruments between late 2004 and early 2005. The artwork and lyrics explore the history, culture, art, and geography of the state—Stevens developed them after analyzing criminal, literary, and historical documents, and weaved them with personal stories. Following its release, Stevens promoted Illinois with a world tour.

The album received widespread critical acclaim from music critics for its well-written lyrics and complex orchestrations. In particular, reviewers noted Stevens' progress as a songwriter since the release of Michigan. Illinois was named the best-reviewed album of 2005 by review aggregator Metacritic, and was included on several reviewers' "best of the decade" lists—including those of Paste, NPR, and Rolling Stone. The album amounted to Stevens' greatest public success to date; it was his first to place on the Billboard 200, and it topped the Billboard list of "Heatseekers Albums". The varied instrumentation and experimental songwriting on the album invoked comparisons to work by Steve Reich, Neil Young, and the Cure. Besides numerous references to Illinois, Stevens continued a theme of his songwriting career by including multiple references to his Christian faith.

== Background, recording, and tour ==
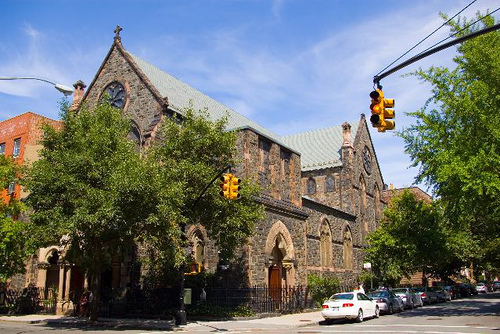
Stevens recorded Illinois in various locations throughout New York City, including Brooklyn's St. Paul's Church.

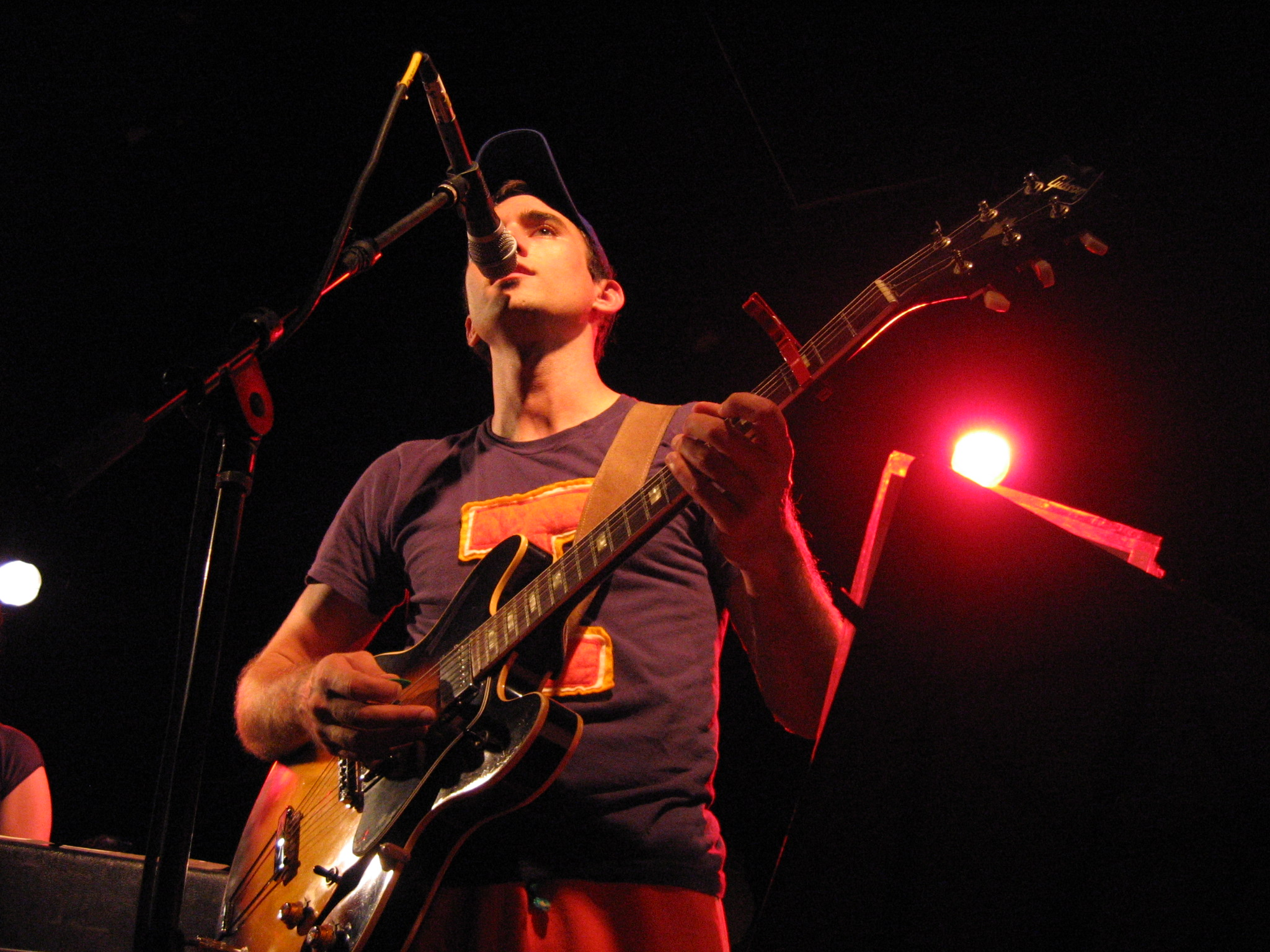
Sufjan Stevens performing on stage during a tour for Illinois. Stevens and his band the Illinoisemakers wore outfits modeled after those of the cheerleaders of the University of Illinois.

Stevens launched his 50-state project in 2003 with the album Michigan and chose to focus on Illinois with this recording because "it wasn't a great leap" and he liked the state, as he considered it to be the American Midwest's "center of gravity". Before creating the album, Stevens read literature by Illinois authors Saul Bellow and Carl Sandburg, and studied immigration records and history books for the state—he made the deliberate decision to avoid current events and focused on historical themes. He also took trips through several locations in Illinois and asked friends and Internet chat rooms for anecdotes about their experiences in the state. Although he began work in 2004 on Oregon-themed songs and briefly considered releasing a Rhode Island-themed 7-inch, Stevens has since not released another album focused on a state, saying in a November 2009 interview with Paste that "the whole premise was such a joke," and telling Andrew Purcell of The Guardian in October 2009 "I have no qualms about admitting [the fifty states project] was a promotional gimmick." An Arkansas-related song was released through NPR as "The Lord God Bird" and material intended for New Jersey and New York became The BQE.

All of the songs on Illinois were written, recorded, engineered, and produced by Stevens, with most of the material being recorded at The Buddy Project studio in Astoria, Queens, and in Stevens' Brooklyn apartment. As with his previous albums, Stevens recorded in various locations, with additional piano recorded in St. Paul's Church in Brooklyn; strings and vocals performed in collaborators' apartments; electronic organ recorded in the New Jerusalem Recreational Room in Clarksboro, New Jersey; and vibraphone played at Carroll Music Studios in New York City. Stevens mostly created the album without collaboration, focusing on the writing, performance, and technical creation of the album by himself: "I was pretty nearsighted in the construction of Illinois. I spent a lot of time alone, a few months in isolation working on my own and in the studio. I let things germinate and cultivate independently, without thinking about an audience or a live show at all."

Stevens employed low-fidelity recording equipment, which allowed him to retain creative control and keep costs low on recording Illinois. Typically, his process involved recording tracks using two Shure SM57s and an AKG C1000, running through a Roland VS880EX, at a sampling rate of 32 kHz (lower than the rates typically used in recording). He then employed Pro Tools for mixing and other production tasks.

After consulting with Michael Kaufmann and Lowell Brams of Asthmatic Kitty about the amount of material he had recorded, Stevens decided against a double album, saying that would be "arrogant". In 2006, several tracks recorded during these sessions were sent to Seattle-based musician and producer James McAllister for additional instrumentation and production, and were released in 2006 on the follow-up album The Avalanche: Outtakes and Extras from the Illinois Album. Among these outtakes are three separate recordings of the song "Chicago"—including the "Multiple Personality Disorder Version", which was produced during a subsequent tour. The "Adult Contemporary Easy Listening Version" of the song was supposed to appear on the Illinois album, but was changed at the last minute.

Illinois was released on July 4, 2005, through Rough Trade Records in Europe and was distributed domestically by Asthmatic Kitty Records starting July 5, 2005. Although he initially had no plans to perform this material live, less than two weeks after the release of Illinois, Stevens embarked on a North American tour to promote the album, performing with a string section of eight to ten members named the Illinoisemakers. He deliberately chose to avoid television as a promotional tool and focused on the tour performances themselves. He was supported on some dates by opening acts Liz Janes (who is also signed to Asthmatic Kitty) and Laura Veirs as well as Illinois collaborator Shara Nova's solo project My Brightest Diamond. He toured in support of the album again from September through November 2006, this time including dates in several European cities. During the 2006 dates, Stevens and his band transitioned from wearing University of Illinois-themed outfits to butterfly suits and bird wings.

== Musical style and themes ==
"They Are Night Zombies!! They Are Neighbors!! They Have Come Back from the Dead!! Ahhhh!"
"They Are Night Zombies!!" refers to various localities of Illinois with the lyrics. Note also the complex instrumentation and vocal harmonizing.

Reviewers have noted similarities between this album and those of musicians and composers in several musical genres—from pop to contemporary classical, even show tunes and jazz-based time signatures. The lyrics and their rich thematic elements have been noted for their literary quality, earning comparisons to Ralph Waldo Emerson, Henry David Thoreau, William Carlos Williams, and Walt Whitman. Genre labels that have been applied to the album include indie folk, indie pop, indie rock, folk rock, anti-folk, chamber folk, and lo-fi.

=== Musical style ===
Reviewers of Illinois have compared Stevens' style to Steve Reich, Vince Guaraldi, the Danielson Famile, Neil Young, Nick Drake, and Death Cab for Cutie. Stevens' use of large orchestral arrangements in his music—much of it played by himself through the use of multi-track recording—has been noted by several reviewers. Rolling Stone summarized the musical influences of Illinois, saying "the music draws from high school marching bands, show tunes and ambient electronics; we can suspect Steve Reich's Music for 18 Musicians is an oft-played record in the Stevens household, since he loves to echo it in his long instrumental passages." A review in The A.V. Club referred to some of the vocal work as "regressively twee communalism", but found Stevens' music overall to be "highly developed". The song "Come On! Feel the Illinoise!" has a saxophone part resembling "Close to Me" by the Cure.

The creation of Illinois marked a shift in Stevens' emphasis on songwriting and studio work toward live performance and more abstract concepts of motion and sound—subsequent tours and albums emphasized electronic music and modern dance over the indie folk material on Michigan and Illinois. He has ceased writing songs about individual characters with straightforward narratives or concept albums and briefly considered quitting the music business entirely after creating and promoting this album. He also found that the way in which he listened to music had changed after producing Illinois:

I think now I listen more as a technician and a researcher. I'm always hearing music in terms of what I can take out of it, and I think I've always listened like that. I have a hard time just listening for pleasure. I'm much less about instinct, and more of a utilitarian listener. Like, what is the use of this song? What is the usefulness of this melody for this theme or statement? What are they doing that's unusual sounding, and how can I learn from that?

— Sufjan Stevens, 2006

Stevens is a classically trained oboist and his knowledge of classical and baroque music influenced many of his arrangements. Stevens himself has noted the influence of composers Igor Stravinsky, Sergei Rachmaninoff, and Edvard Grieg; along with minimalist composers Terry Riley, Steve Reich, and Philip Glass. The music on this album was written to be grandiose, to match the history of the territory. Stevens used time signature changes in the composition of Illinois for dynamic effect—for instance, "Come On! Feel the Illinoise!" begins with a 5/4 time signature and then changes to a standard 4/4 later in the song.

=== Personal and Illinois themes ===
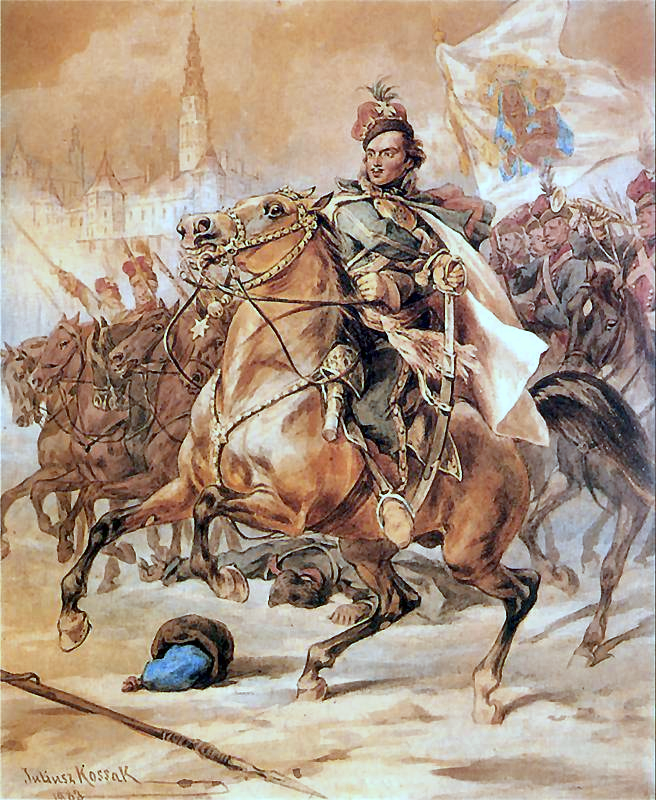
Casimir Pulaski is memorialized in Illinois by the name of Pulaski County, Pulaski Road in Chicago, as well as the state holiday Casimir Pulaski Day.

Many of the lyrics in Illinois make references to persons, places, and events related to the state of the same name. "Concerning the UFO Sighting Near Highland, Illinois" is about a UFO sighting by police officers near Highland, Illinois, where several persons reported seeing a large triangular object with three lights flying at night. "Come on! Feel the Illinoise!" makes reference to the World's Columbian Exposition, which took place in Chicago in 1893.

"John Wayne Gacy, Jr." documents the story of the 1970s Chicago-based serial killer of the same name. Several lyrics make explicit references to events in his life: "[w]hen the swingset hit his head" refers to an event in Gacy's childhood, when a swing hit his head and caused a blood clot in his brain; "He dressed up like a clown for them / with his face paint white and red" alludes to the nickname given to Gacy—the "Killer Clown"; and "He put a cloth on their lips / Quiet hands, quiet kiss on the mouth" references Gacy's use of chloroform to subdue and rape his victims. The song ends with the narrator turning inward with the lyrics: "And in my best behavior, I am really just like him / Look beneath the floorboards for the secrets I have hid." Stevens stated in a 2009 interview with Paste that "we're all capable of what [Gacy] did."

"Casimir Pulaski Day" interweaves a personal story with the state holiday Casimir Pulaski Day. "The Man of Metropolis Steals Our Hearts" makes references to Superman, whose fictional hometown of Metropolis was partially modeled after Chicago (the town of Metropolis, Illinois has also capitalized on this association). Jessica Hopper of the Chicago Reader noted that Ray Middleton—who was the first actor to play the comic book superhero—was also born in Chicago. "They Are Night Zombies!! They Are Neighbors!! They Have Come Back from the Dead!! Ahhhh!" makes references to ghost towns of Illinois. Stevens relates experiences from a summer camp he went to as a child in Michigan for "The Predatory Wasp of the Palisades Is Out to Get Us!", but moved the locale to Illinois for the sake of the album. The song has been interpreted either as a story about friendship, or about a male romantic partner of Stevens. The track "Decatur, or, Round of Applause for Your Stepmother!" includes references to Decatur, Illinois, but Stevens stated the track also acted as "an exercise in rhyme schemes". Some references to Decatur included in the song were alligator sightings in the area, the equipment manufacturer Caterpillar, and a flood that exhumed a graveyard of soldiers from the Civil War. During the tour following the release of Illinois, Stevens' band wore cheerleader outfits based on those of the University of Illinois.

=== Christianity ===
"Casimir Pulaski Day"
The lyrics to "Casimir Pulaski Day" include the narrator questioning God's judgement.

Although Illinois is a concept album about the U.S. state, Stevens also explored themes related to Christianity and the Bible. As a Christian, he has written and recorded music about spiritual themes throughout his career—particularly on the 2004 album Seven Swans—and prefers to talk about religious topics through song rather than directly in interviews or public statements. The song "Decatur, or, Round of Applause for Your Stepmother!" includes the line "It's the great I Am"—taken from the response God gave when Moses asked for his name in the Book of Exodus. "Casimir Pulaski Day" describes the death of a romantic partner due to bone cancer (despite Bible study prayers for healing), and the narrator questions God in the process. More abstract allusions appear in "The Man of Metropolis Steals Our Hearts", which utilizes Superman as a Christ figure and "The Seer's Tower", which references the Book of Revelation and the Second Coming of Christ. Songs which were not written with an explicit theological focus—such as "John Wayne Gacy, Jr."—also feature religious themes such as sin and redemption.

== Artwork ==
Comparison of the four different versions of the album art. From top, left to right: original artwork, balloon sticker covering Superman, Superman image removed, balloon image added to the artwork itself.

The Blue Marvel edition from 2015.

Divya Srinivasan created the album artwork, depicting a variety of Illinois-related themes, including Abraham and Mary Todd Lincoln, the Sears Tower, and Black Hawk. The album cover reads, "Sufjan Stevens Invites You To: Come On Feel the Illinoise!" as a wordplay on the common mispronunciation of the state's name as "ill-i-NOYZ" and a reference to the Slade song "Cum On Feel the Noize" made famous in the United States by the metal band Quiet Riot. The text on the cover caused some confusion over the actual title of the album—it is officially titled Illinois, as opposed to Come on Feel the Illinoise or Illinoise. Paste listed Illinois as having the seventh best album art of the decade 2000–2009. The album also won the PLUG Independent Music Award for Album Art/Packaging of the Year in 2006.

Shortly after the release of the album, reports arose that DC Comics had issued a cease and desist letter to Asthmatic Kitty because of the depiction of Superman on the cover. However, on October 4, 2005, Asthmatic Kitty announced that there had been no cease and desist letter; the record company's own lawyers had warned about the copyright infringement. On June 30, 2005, Asthmatic Kitty's distributor Secretly Canadian asked its retailers not to sell the album; however, it was not recalled. On July 5, the distributor told its retailers to go ahead and sell their copies, as DC Comics agreed to allow Asthmatic Kitty to sell the copies of the album that were already manufactured, but the image was removed from subsequent pressings. Soon after it was made public that the cover would be changed, copies of the album featuring Superman were sold for as high as $75 on eBay. On the vinyl edition released on November 22, 2005, Superman's image is covered by a balloon sticker. The image of the balloon sticker was also used on the cover of the compact disc and later printings of the double vinyl release. Stevens himself was surprised by the development and also had to pay a fee for referencing lyrics from Woody Guthrie's folk anthem "This Land Is Your Land" in the track "No Man's Land", which was later released on The Avalanche.

The 10th anniversary vinyl reissue of Illinois features the Marvel Comics character Blue Marvel, who hails from Chicago, in place of Superman. Asthmatic Kitty obtained permission from the publisher to use the character's likeness. The Blue Marvel edition's artwork was created by Divya Srinivasan and has LP 1 on "cape white" vinyl, LP 2 on "antimatter blue" vinyl, and a bonus single of "Chicago (Demo)" (on both sides) on a red vinyl 12" disc shaped like a six-sided star in reference to the municipal flag of Chicago.

== Critical reception ==
Professional ratings
Aggregate scores
Source	Rating
Metacritic	90/100
Review scores
Source	Rating
AllMusic	4/5 stars
Entertainment Weekly	B+
The Guardian	4/5 stars
The Independent	5/5 stars
Los Angeles Times	4/4 stars
NME	8/10
Pitchfork	9.2/10
Rolling Stone	4/5 stars
Spin	A−
The Village Voice	A−

Illinois was Sufjan Stevens' greatest commercial and critical success to date. For the first time, his work charted on the Billboard 200 and received several awards from critics. According to the review aggregator Metacritic, Illinois received "universal acclaim" based on a weighted average score of 90 out of 100 from 40 critic scores. The site assesses this as "universal acclaim" and designated it the best-reviewed album of 2005, alongside Z by My Morning Jacket. In 2020, Consequence of Sound ranked several of Stevens' studio albums, with Illinois coming in second behind the 2015 release Carrie & Lowell.

Andy Battaglia of The A.V. Club said that Stevens "has grown into one of the best song-makers in indie rock" with the album. Tim Jonze of NME called Illinois "a brainy little fucker" and described Stevens as "prolific, intelligent and—most importantly—brimming with heart-wrenching melodies." Rob Sheffield of Rolling Stone responded favorably to the album, praising the "over-the-top arrangements" and Stevens' "breathy, gentle voice" as well as the personal nature of songs such as "Chicago" and "Casimir Pulaski Day", but criticized "John Wayne Gacy, Jr.", stating that it "symbolizes nothing about American life except the existence of creative-writing workshops". Michael Metivier of PopMatters described "John Wayne Gacy, Jr." as "horrifying, tragic, and deeply sad without proselytizing." Amanda Petrusich of Pitchfork described Illinois as "strange and lush, as excessive and challenging as its giant, gushing song titles." Dave Simpson of The Guardian echoed this sentiment by saying that the music sounds like "The Polyphonic Spree produced by Brian Eno." The diversity in instrumentation also received a positive review from Entertainment Weekly's Kristina Feliciano.

Jesse Jarnow of Paste praised the playful nature of Illinois, commenting that it had "sing-song" melodies and "jaunty" orchestrations. Jarnow also noted ironic lyrics, citing a line from "The Predatory Wasp of the Palisades is Out to Get Us!": "I can't explain the state I'm in ..." after a section of the song that references many Illinois landmarks. Q called the album a "sizeable step forward" from Michigan, and said Stevens' love for the state of Illinois is infectious. Critic Andy Gill dubbed Illinois "an extraordinary achievement" in Uncut, and in a separate review for The Independent added that it "makes most other albums seem small-minded and, ironically, rather parochial." Catherine Lewis of The Washington Post responded favorably to the album, stating that it has well-written lyrics, comparing Stevens' rhyming to that of Stephin Merritt. Lewis cited "Casimir Pulaski Day" as one of the most memorable songs of the album. In December 2005, American webzine Somewhere Cold voted Illinois CD of the Year on their 2005 Somewhere Cold Awards Hall of Fame list.

=== Accolades ===
Illinois achieved recognition with inclusion on numerous reviewers' "best of the year" and "best of the decade" lists. In particular, the album topped the best of the decade list appearing in the November 2009 issue of Paste and NPR named Illinois on their list of "The Decade's 50 Most Important Recordings". Pitchfork called Illinois the sixteenth best album of the decade, with Stevens' previous album—Michigan—placing 70 on that same list. The album also won the 2005 New Pantheon Award—a type of Shortlist Music Prize. The album was also included in the book 1001 Albums You Must Hear Before You Die. Paste listed Stevens as one of their "100 Best Living Songwriters" in 2006, primarily due to the writing on Michigan and Illinois. In 2026, Pitchfork ranked Illinois #18 on its list of the 100 Best Indie Rock Albums of All Time.

Best of the year (2005) lists
Publisher	Accolade	Rank
All Songs Considered	The Best Music of 2005	1
Amazon.com	Best of 2005: Top 100 Editors' Picks	1
Amazon.com	Best of 2005: Editors' Picks in Alternative Rock	2
NME	50 best albums of 2005	7
No Ripcord	Top 50 Albums of 2005	1
Pitchfork	Top 50 Albums of 2005	1
PopMatters	Best 50 Albums of 2005	2
Spin	The 40 Best Albums of 2005	8
Stylus Magazine	Top 50 Albums of 2005	10
The Wire	50 Records of the Year	28

Best of the decade (2000–2009) lists
Publisher	Accolade	Rank
All Songs Considered	The Decade's 50 Most Important Recordings	Unranked, out of 50 recordings
NME	The Top 100 Greatest Albums of the Decade	17
No Ripcord	The No Ripcord Years (1999–2009)	Unranked, one of six reviewed for 2005
Paste	The 50 Best Albums of the Decade	1
Pitchfork	The Top 200 Albums of the 2000s	16
Rolling Stone	100 Best Albums of the '00s	78
Slant Magazine	Best of the Aughts: Albums	9

== Commercial performance ==
In its first week of sales, Illinois sold 9,000 copies, 20% coming from online sales. Overall, the album sold more than 100,000 copies by November 2005 and over 300,000 by the end of 2009. It was Stevens' first release to place on the Billboard 200, reaching number 121 within eight weeks on the chart. It also reached number one on Billboard's Heatseekers Albums chart and number four on the Independent Albums chart, remaining on them for 32 and 39 weeks, respectively. In August 2017, the album was certified gold by the Recording Industry Association of America (RIAA), signifying shipments in excess of 500,000 copies in the United States.

In July 2013, it was certified silver by the British Phonographic Industry (BPI) for 60,000 sold units in the United Kingdom and in April 2023, it was certified gold for 100,000 sold units.

== Track listing ==
All tracks are written by Sufjan Stevens.

Illinois track listing
No.	Title	Length
1.	"Concerning the UFO Sighting Near Highland, Illinois"	2:08
2.	"The Black Hawk War, or, How to Demolish an Entire Civilization and Still Feel Good About Yourself in the Morning, or, We Apologize for the Inconvenience but You're Going to Have to Leave Now, or, 'I Have Fought the Big Knives and Will Continue to Fight Them Until They Are Off Our Lands!'"	2:14
3.	"Come On! Feel the Illinoise!" (Part I: "The World's Columbian Exposition" / Part II: "Carl Sandburg Visits Me in a Dream")	6:45
4.	"John Wayne Gacy, Jr."	3:19
5.	"Jacksonville"	5:24
6.	"A Short Reprise for Mary Todd, Who Went Insane, but for Very Good Reasons"	0:47
7.	"Decatur, or, Round of Applause for Your Stepmother!"	3:03
8.	"One Last 'Whoo-Hoo!' for the Pullman!!"	0:06
9.	"Chicago"	6:04
10.	"Casimir Pulaski Day"	5:53
11.	"To the Workers of the Rock River Valley Region, I Have an Idea Concerning Your Predicament, and It Involves an Inner Tube, Bath Mats, and 21 Able-bodied Men"	1:40
12.	"The Man of Metropolis Steals Our Hearts"	6:17
13.	"Prairie Fire That Wanders About"	2:11
14.	"A Conjunction of Drones Simulating the Way in Which Sufjan Stevens Has an Existential Crisis in the Great Godfrey Maze"	0:19
15.	"The Predatory Wasp of the Palisades Is Out to Get Us!"	5:23
16.	"They Are Night Zombies!! They Are Neighbors!! They Have Come Back from the Dead!! Ahhhh!"	5:09
17.	"Let's Hear That String Part Again, Because I Don't Think They Heard It All the Way Out in Bushnell"	0:40
18.	"In This Temple as in the Hearts of Man for Whom He Saved the Earth"	0:35
19.	"The Seer's Tower"	3:53
20.	"The Tallest Man, the Broadest Shoulders" (Part I: "The Great Frontier" / Part II: "Come to Me Only with Playthings Now")	7:02
21.	"Riffs and Variations on a Single Note for Jelly Roll, Earl Hines, Louis Armstrong, Baby Dodds, and the King of Swing, to Name a Few"	0:46
22.	"Out of Egypt, into the Great Laugh of Mankind, and I Shake the Dirt from My Sandals as I Run"	4:21
Total length:		73:59

Bonus tracks
No.	Title	Version	Length
23.	"Chicago" (To String Remix)	iTunes release	5:32
24.	"The Avalanche"	iTunes release and LP version of Illinois (as track 23)	3:14
25.	"The Transfiguration" (Home Demo Version)	iTunes release	5:04
26.	"Size Too Small" (Live in Brussels)	iTunes release	3:08
Total length:			77:13 (LP) 90:57 (dig.)

Bonus track on bonus 12-inch single included with the 2016 Blue Marvel reissue
No.	Title	Length
1.	"Chicago" (Original Demo)	4:36

Note

- The titles of the songs vary slightly from the Compact Disc, digital, and vinyl releases. Full titles come directly from the vinyl album and have been adapted to the English titlecase standards.

== Personnel ==
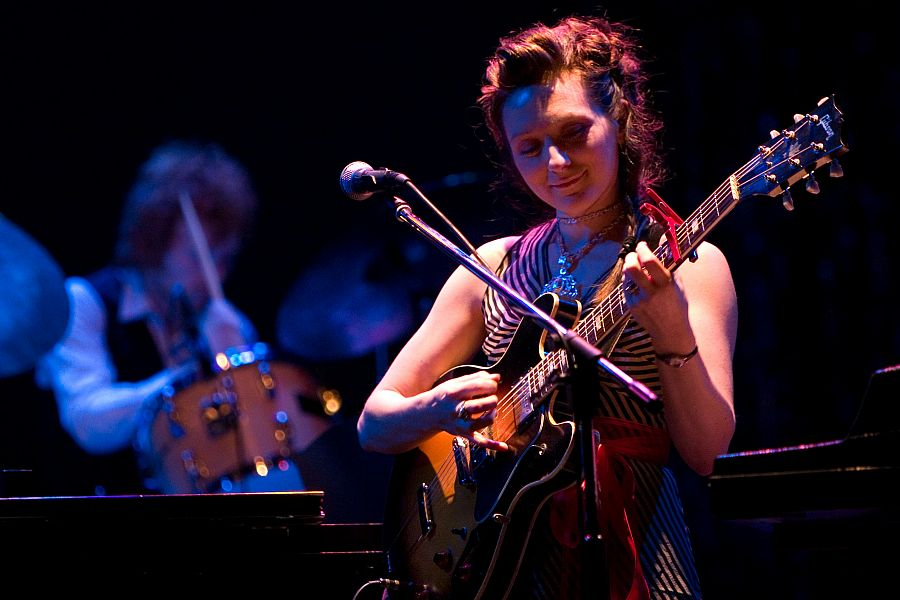
Shara Worden of My Brightest Diamond was one of several collaborators on Illinois and also opened for Stevens on his subsequent tour

- Sufjan Stevens – acoustic guitar, piano, Wurlitzer, bass guitar, drums, electric guitar, oboe, alto saxophone, flute, banjo, glockenspiel, accordion, vibraphone, recorders (alto, sopranino, soprano, & tenor), Casiotone MT-70, sleigh bells, shakers, tambourine, triangle, electronic organ, vocals, arrangements, engineering, recording, production
- Alan Douches – mastering at West West Side Music, Tenafly, New Jersey
- The Illinoisemaker Choir – backing vocals and clapping on "The Black Hawk War, or, How to Demolish an Entire Civilization and Still Feel Good About Yourself in the Morning, or, We Apologize for the Inconvenience but You're Going to Have to Leave Now, or, 'I Have Fought the Big Knives and Will Continue to Fight Them Until They Are Off Our Lands!'", "Chicago", "The Man of Metropolis Steals Our Hearts", "They Are Night Zombies!! They Are Neighbors!! They Have Come Back from the Dead!! Ahhhh!", and "The Tallest Man, the Broadest Shoulders"

- Tom Eaton
- Jennifer Hoover
- Katrina Kerns
- Beccy Lock
- Tara McDonnell

- The String Quartet – strings on "Come On! Feel the Illinoise (Part II)", "Jacksonville", "A Short Reprise for Mary Todd", "Chicago", "They Are Night Zombies!! They Are Neighbors!! They Have Come Back from the Dead!! Ahhhh!", and "The Tallest Man, the Broadest Shoulders"

- Julianne Carney – violin
- Marla Hansen – viola
- Maria Bella Jeffers – cello
- Rob Moose – violin

- Katrina Kerns – backing vocals on "Concerning the UFO Sighting Near Highland, Illinois", "Come On! Feel the Illinoise!", "Jacksonville", "Prairie Fire That Wanders About", "The Predatory Wasp of the Palisades Is Out to Get Us!", "The Seer's Tower", "The Tallest Man, the Broadest Shoulders", and "The Avalanche"
- James McAlister – drums (credited in the liner notes with "all the sophisticated drum parts"), drum engineering
- Craig Montoro – trumpet on "The Black Hawk War, or, How to Demolish an Entire Civilization and Still Feel Good About Yourself in the Morning, or, We Apologize for the Inconvenience but You're Going to Have to Leave Now, or, 'I Have Fought the Big Knives and Will Continue to Fight Them Until They Are Off Our Lands!'", "Come On! Feel the Illinoise!", "Jacksonville", "Chicago", "Casimir Pulaski Day", "To the Workers of the Rock River Valley Region, I Have an Idea Concerning Your Predicament", "The Man of Metropolis Steals Our Hearts", "The Predatory Wasp of the Palisades is Out to Get Us!", "The Tallest Man, The Broadest Shoulders", and "Riffs and Variations on a Single Note", backing vocals on "They Are Night Zombies!! They Are Neighbors!! They Have Come Back from the Dead!! Ahhhh!"
- Matt Morgan – backing vocals on "Decatur, or, Round of Applause for Your Stepmother!"
- Daniel and Elin Smith – backing vocals and clapping on "Decatur, or, Round of Applause for Your Stepmother!"
- Divya Srinivasan – artwork
- Shara Worden – backing vocals on "Concerning the UFO Sighting Near Highland, Illinois", "Come On! Feel the Illinoise!", "John Wayne Gacy, Jr.", "Casimir Pulaski Day", "Prairie Fire That Wanders About", "The Predatory Wasp of the Palisades Is Out to Get Us!", "The Seer's Tower", "The Tallest Man, the Broadest Shoulders", and "The Avalanche"

== Charts ==
=== Weekly charts ===
Weekly chart performance for Illinois
Chart (2005)	Peak position
Australian Albums (ARIA)	86
Dutch Albums (Album Top 100)	80
Norwegian Albums (VG-lista)	34
UK Albums (Official Charts)	124
US Billboard 200	121
US Heatseekers Albums (Billboard)	1
US Independent Albums (Billboard)	4
UK Independent Albums (Official Charts)	10
Scottish Albums (Official Charts)	87

=== Year-end charts ===
Year-end chart performance for Illinois
Chart (2006)	Peak position
US Independent Albums (Billboard)	41

== Certifications ==
Sales certifications for Illinois
Region	Certification	Certified units/sales
United Kingdom (BPI)	Gold	100,000^{‡}
United States (RIAA)	Gold	500,000^{‡}
^{‡} Sales+streaming figures based on certification alone.

== Musical adaptation ==
Illinois was adapted into a dance-based musical, Illinoise, directed and choreographed by Justin Peck with a companion book written by Jackie Sibblies Drury and Peck. It premiered at Bard College on June 23, 2023, and a Chicago production opened at Chicago Shakespeare Theatre on February 3, 2024. The show features new arrangements for a live band and three voices, and aims to "lead [the audience] on a mighty journey through the American heartland, from campfire storytelling to the edges of the cosmos". It debuted in New York on March 2, 2024, at Park Avenue Armory, and opened on Broadway at the St. James Theater from April to August 2024.

== See also ==
- 2005 in music
- Culture of Chicago
- "Cum On Feel the Noize" – a 1973 hard rock song by Slade that inspired the full title of the album
- Donald Glover, who remixed the album as Illin'-Noise! under the name mc DJ
- Greetings from Cairo, Illinois – a 2005 album from Stace England about Cairo, Illinois
- Songs about the United States
- State Songs – a 1999 album from John Linnell about American states, which leads off with a song about Illinois
- Will it play in Peoria?
