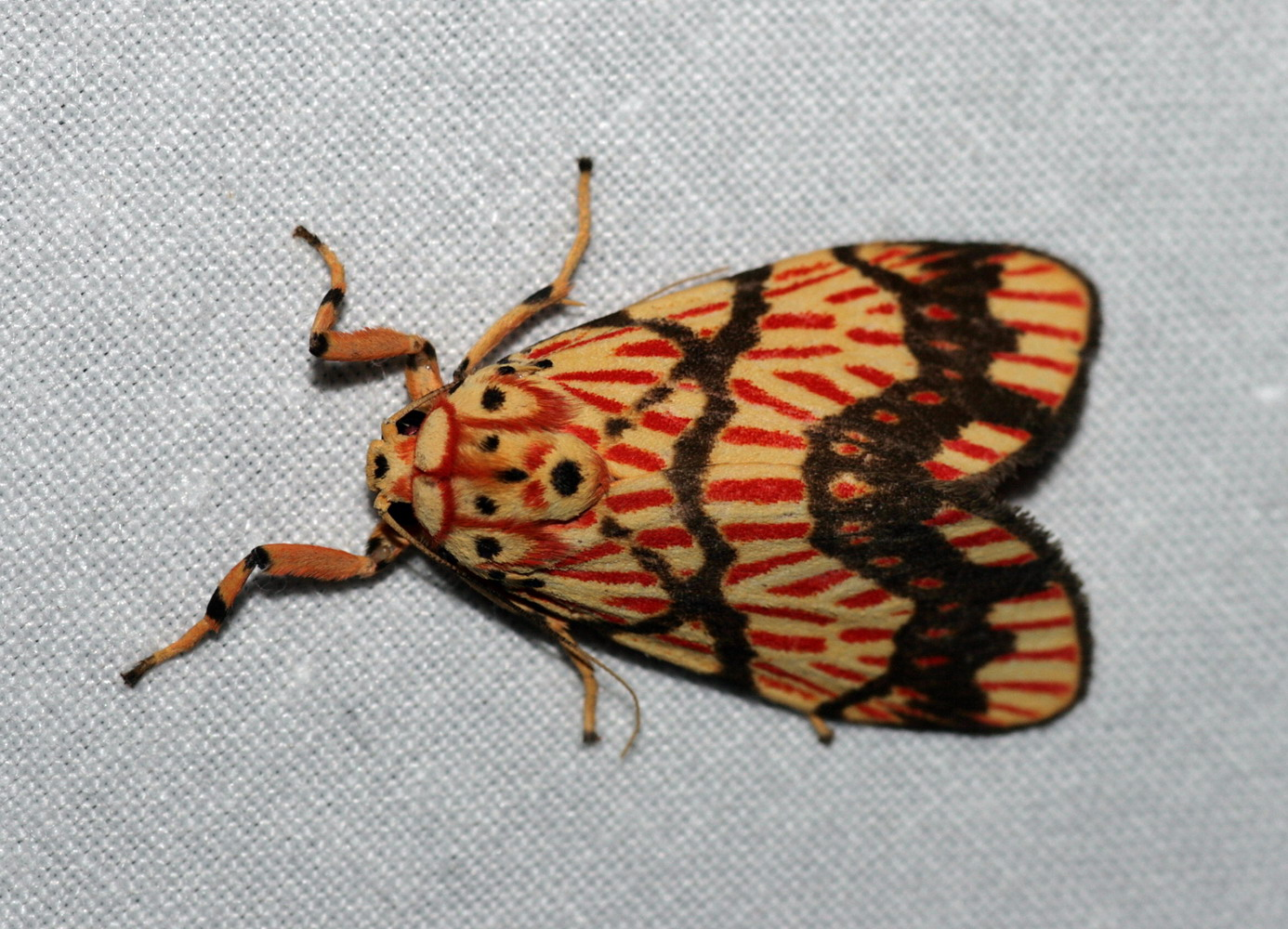

Scientific classification
- Kingdom: Animalia
- Phylum: Arthropoda
- Class: Insecta
- Order: Lepidoptera
- Superfamily: Noctuoidea
- Family: Erebidae
- Subfamily: Arctiinae
- Genus: Barsine
- Species: B. euprepia

Binomial name
- Barsine euprepia (Hampson, 1900)

Synonyms
- Miltochrista euprepia Hampson, 1900

= Barsine euprepia =

Species of moth

Barsine euprepia is a species of moth of the family Erebidae, subfamily Arctiinae. It is found endemic to Borneo. It is an uncommon species occurring over a wide altitude range from the lowlands (including dry heath forest at Telisai in Brunei) to 1,660 meters.
