= Barsine fuscozonata =

Scientific classification
- Kingdom: Animalia
- Phylum: Arthropoda
- Class: Insecta
- Order: Lepidoptera
- Superfamily: Noctuoidea
- Family: Erebidae
- Subfamily: Arctiinae
- Genus: Barsine
- Species: B. fuscozonata

Binomial name
- Barsine fuscozonata (Inoue, 1980)

Species of moth

Barsine fuscozonata is a moth of the family Erebidae. It was described by Hiroshi Inoue in 1980. It is found in Taiwan.
