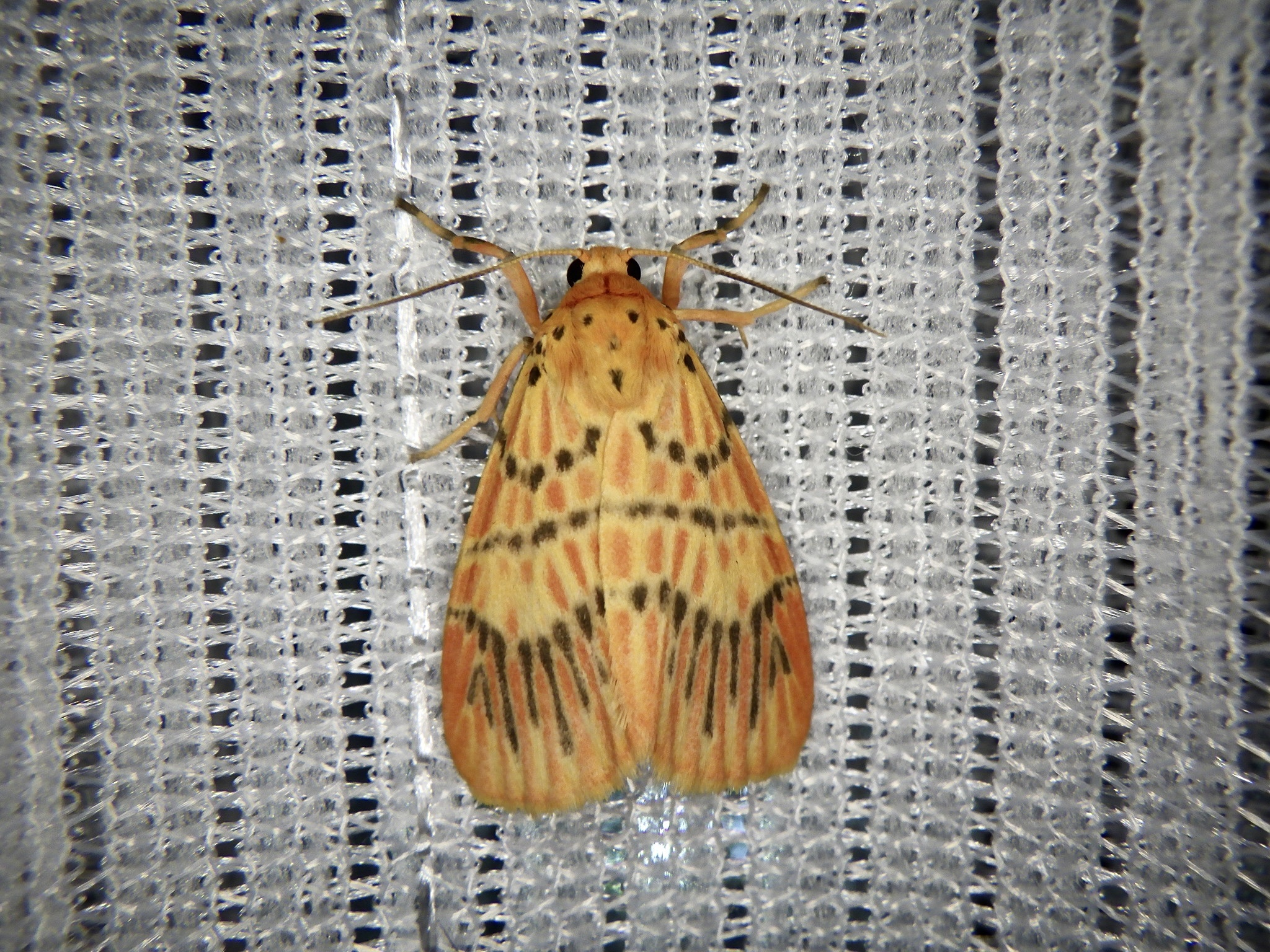
- Barsine pulchra, China

Scientific classification
- Kingdom: Animalia
- Phylum: Arthropoda
- Class: Insecta
- Order: Lepidoptera
- Superfamily: Noctuoidea
- Family: Erebidae
- Subfamily: Arctiinae
- Tribe: Lithosiini
- Subtribe: Nudariina
- Genus: Barsine
- Species: B. pulchra

Binomial name
- Barsine pulchra (Butler, 1877)

Synonyms
- Miltochrista gratiosa pulchra Butler, 1877; Miltochrista sapporensis Matsumura, 1930; Miltochrista pulchra Butler, 1877

= Barsine pulchra =

Species of moth

Barsine pulchra is a species of lichen moth in the family Erebidae, found in Korea, Japan, and eastern Asia.

== Subspecies ==
These two subspecies belong to the species Barsine pulchra:

- Barsine pulchra pulcherrima (Staudinger, 1887)
- Barsine pulchra pulchra (Butler, 1877)
