= Ricky Ubeda =

American dancer and actor

- Born: 1995 or 1996 (age 28–29); Miami, Florida, U.S.
- Occupations: Dancer; actor
- Years active: 2014–present
- Known for: Winning Season 11 of So You Think You Can Dance

Ricky Ubeda (born December 4, 1995) is an American dancer and actor known for winning season 11 of So You Think You Can Dance.

== Early life and career ==
Ubeda was born in Miami, Florida, and graduated from Coral Reef Senior High School in May 2014. While in high school, Ubeda auditioned for Fox's dance-competition reality series So You Think You Can Dance and was chosen as one of 20 competitors for the show's eleventh season, which aired weekly from July through September 2014. Ubeda won the competition in first place and, as part of his prize, received an ensemble role in the 2014 Broadway revival of On the Town. He performed in the role from February 27 through April 26, 2015.

Ubeda's next Broadway appearance was as Mr. Mistoffelees in the 2016 revival of Cats. For this role, he was nominated for the 2017 Chita Rivera Award for Outstanding Male Dancer in a Broadway Show. In 2018, Ubeda performed in the ensemble of Carousel on Broadway.

Ubeda played Indio (a member of the Sharks gang) and understudied Bernardo in the 2020 Broadway revival of West Side Story, which opened in February and closed in March, due to the COVID-19 Broadway shutdown. He appears as Flaco, another Shark, in Steven Spielberg's 2021 film adaptation of the musical.

He has also toured with Travis Wall's dance company, Shaping Sound. He appeared as one of Jack Cole's dancers in an episode of the 2019 FX miniseries Fosse/Verdon.

== Theatre credits ==
Year	Title	Role	Notes	Ref.
2015	On the Town	Ensemble	Broadway	
2016	Cats	Mr. Mistoffelees	Broadway	
2018	Carousel	Ensemble	Broadway	
2020	West Side Story	Indio; u/s Bernardo	Broadway	
2024	Illinoise	Henry	Chicago	
2024	Illinoise	Henry	Off-Broadway	
2024	Illinoise	Henry	Broadway	
