= Barsine mactans =

Scientific classification
- Domain: Eukaryota
- Kingdom: Animalia
- Phylum: Arthropoda
- Class: Insecta
- Order: Lepidoptera
- Superfamily: Noctuoidea
- Family: Erebidae
- Subfamily: Arctiinae
- Genus: Barsine
- Species: B. mactans

Binomial name
- Barsine mactans Butler, 1877

Species of moth

Barsine mactans is a moth of the family Erebidae. It was described by Arthur Gardiner Butler in 1877. It is found in India and China.
