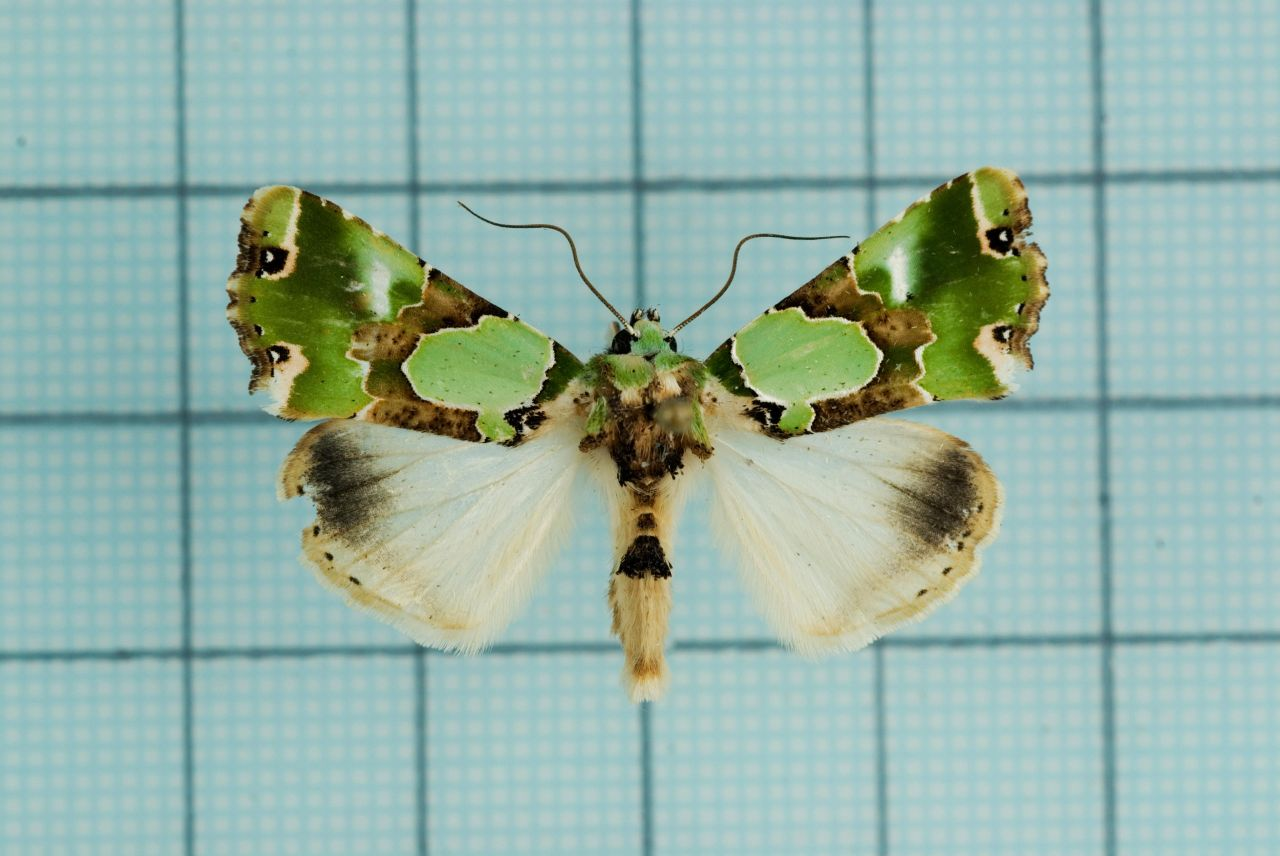

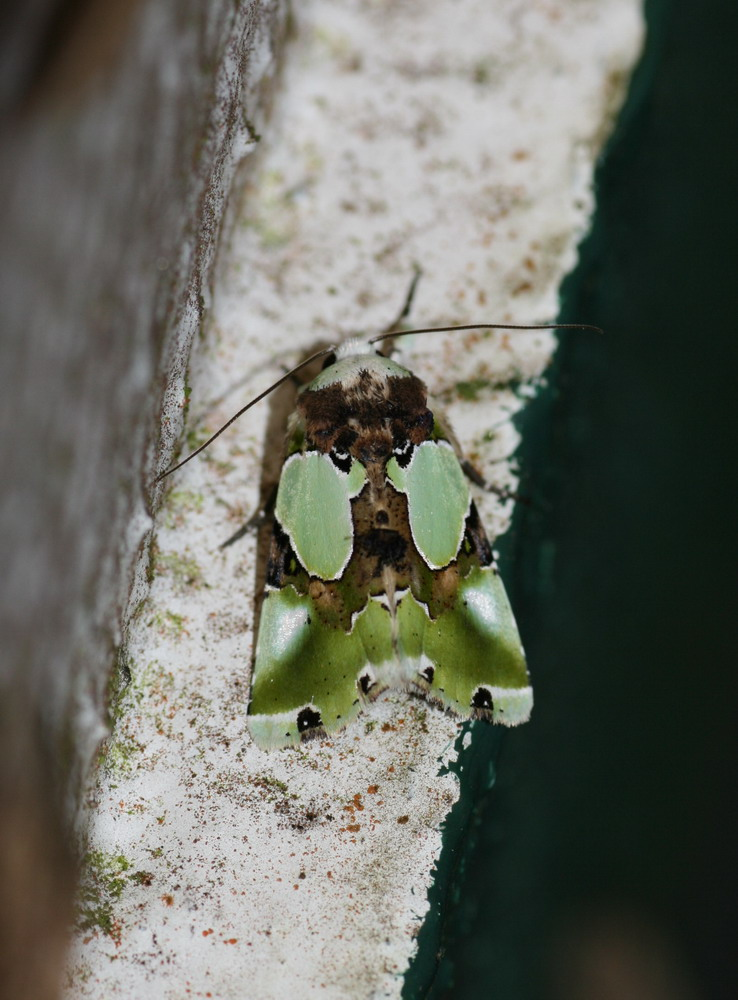

Scientific classification
- Domain: Eukaryota
- Kingdom: Animalia
- Phylum: Arthropoda
- Class: Insecta
- Order: Lepidoptera
- Superfamily: Noctuoidea
- Family: Noctuidae
- Genus: Nacna
- Species: N. malachitis

Binomial name
- Nacna malachitis (Oberthur, 1880)

Synonyms
- Telesilla malachitis Oberthur, 1880; Nacna malachites; Diphtera malachitis

= Nacna malachitis =

Species of moth

Nacna malachitis is a moth in the family Noctuidae. It is found in Japan, the Russian Far East and Taiwan.

The wingspan is 28–30 mm.
