= Barsine linga =

Scientific classification
- Kingdom: Animalia
- Phylum: Arthropoda
- Class: Insecta
- Order: Lepidoptera
- Superfamily: Noctuoidea
- Family: Erebidae
- Subfamily: Arctiinae
- Genus: Barsine
- Species: B. linga

Binomial name
- Barsine linga Moore, 1859

Synonyms
- Miltochrista linga (Moore, 1860) Miltochrista spilosomoides (Moore 1878)

Species of moth

Barsine linga is a moth of the family Erebidae. It was described by Frederic Moore in 1859. It is found in Pakistan, India, China and Thailand.
