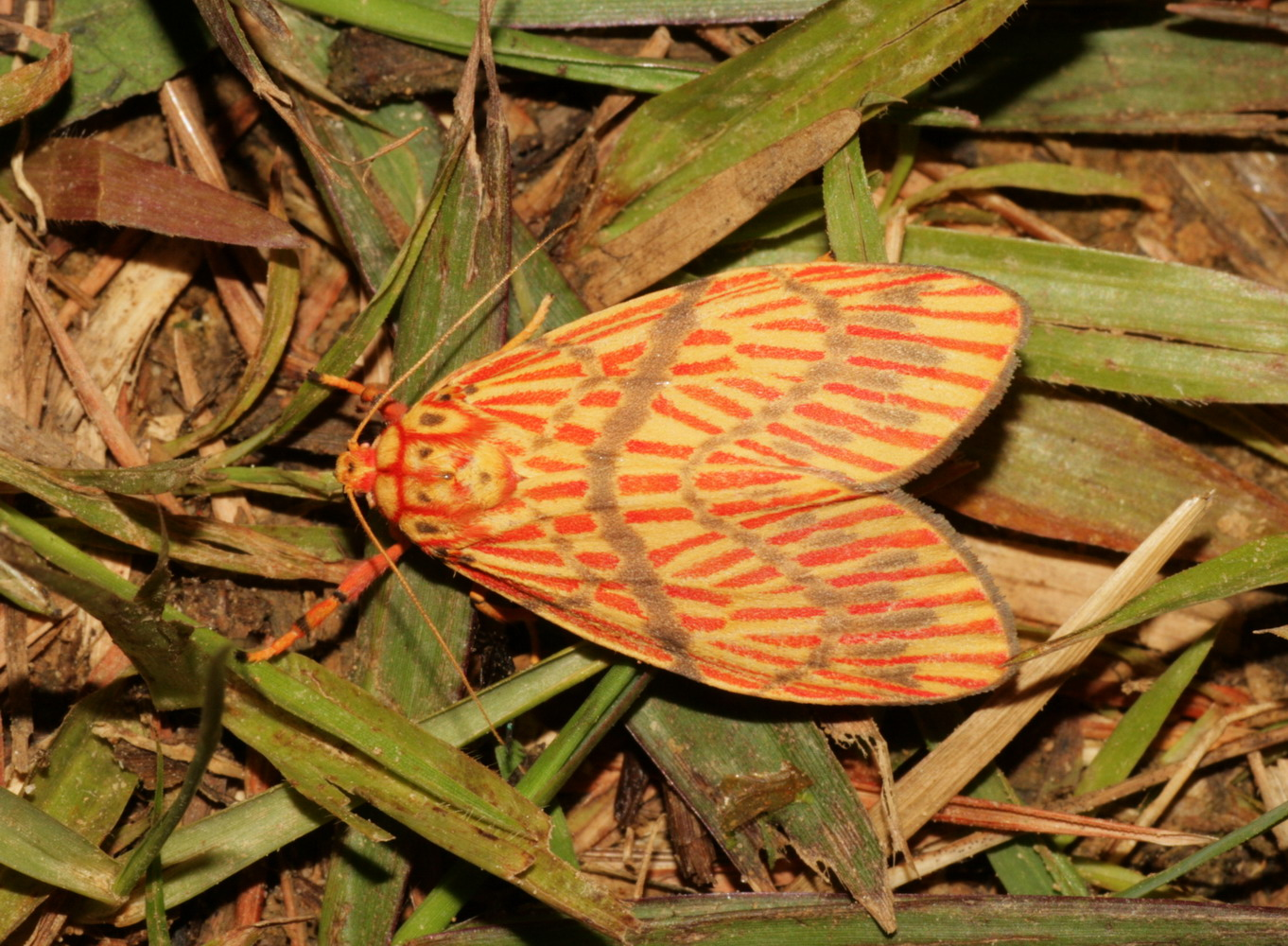

Scientific classification
- Kingdom: Animalia
- Phylum: Arthropoda
- Clade: Pancrustacea
- Class: Insecta
- Order: Lepidoptera
- Superfamily: Noctuoidea
- Family: Erebidae
- Subfamily: Arctiinae
- Genus: Barsine
- Species: B. lucibilis

Binomial name
- Barsine lucibilis C. Swinhoe, 1892

Synonyms
- Miltochrista lucibilis (C. Swinhoe, 1892)

= Barsine lucibilis =

Species of moth

Barsine lucibilis is a moth of the family Erebidae, subfamily Arctiinae. The species was first described by Charles Swinhoe in 1892. It is endemic to Borneo. It is found in lowland forests and also occurs in disturbed habitats. It is found at elevations up to 1,000 metres (3,300 ft).
