= Greetings from Cairo, Illinois =

Greetings From Cairo, Illinois

Studio album by Stace England
- Released: April 19, 2005
- Recorded: 2004
- Genre: Folk, rock, country
- Length: 40:58
- Label: Gnashville Sounds
- Producer: Stace England, Mike Lescelius

Stace England chronology
Lovey Dovey ALL the Time (2003)	Greetings From Cairo, Illinois (2005)

Professional ratings
Review scores
Source	Rating
The Village Voice	(B+) link
National Public Radio	(not rated) link
De Volkskrant	(8/10)
HARP magazine	(not rated) link^{[usurped]}
VPRO (radio documentary)	(not rated) link

Greetings From Cairo, Illinois is a 2005 concept album and historical album by Stace England with songs referencing the history of Cairo, Illinois from 1858 to 2005. The project encompassed five years of research and two years of writing and recording the music.

The songs concern people, places and things throughout Cairo's history including Ulysses S. Grant, the American Civil War, blues music, lynching, the Great Migration, Civil Rights struggles, vigilante groups, Jesse Jackson, political corruption, economic decline and hope for renewal.

The album was the subject of a radio documentary on VPRO Dutch National Broadcasting produced by noted musicologist and author Jan Donkers, and features a vocal performance by alternative country pioneer Jason Ringenberg of Jason & the Scorchers. The album's title and cover art are inspired by Bruce Springsteen's debut, Greetings from Asbury Park, N.J.

== Track listing ==
1. "Goin' Down to Cairo" – 1:54
2. "Cairo Blues" – 3:52
3. "Grant Slept Here" – 3:25
4. "Equal Opportunity Lynch Mob" – 3:56
5. "The North Starts in Cairo" – 3:29
6. "Far from the Tree" – 4:04
7. "White Hats" – 4:54
8. "Jesse's Comin' to Town" – 4:58
9. "Buy My Votes" – 3:34
10. "Prosperity Train" – 3:02
11. "Can't We All Get Along" – 3:46

== See also ==
- 2005 in music
- Illinois – a 2005 album from Sufjan Stevens about Illinois
