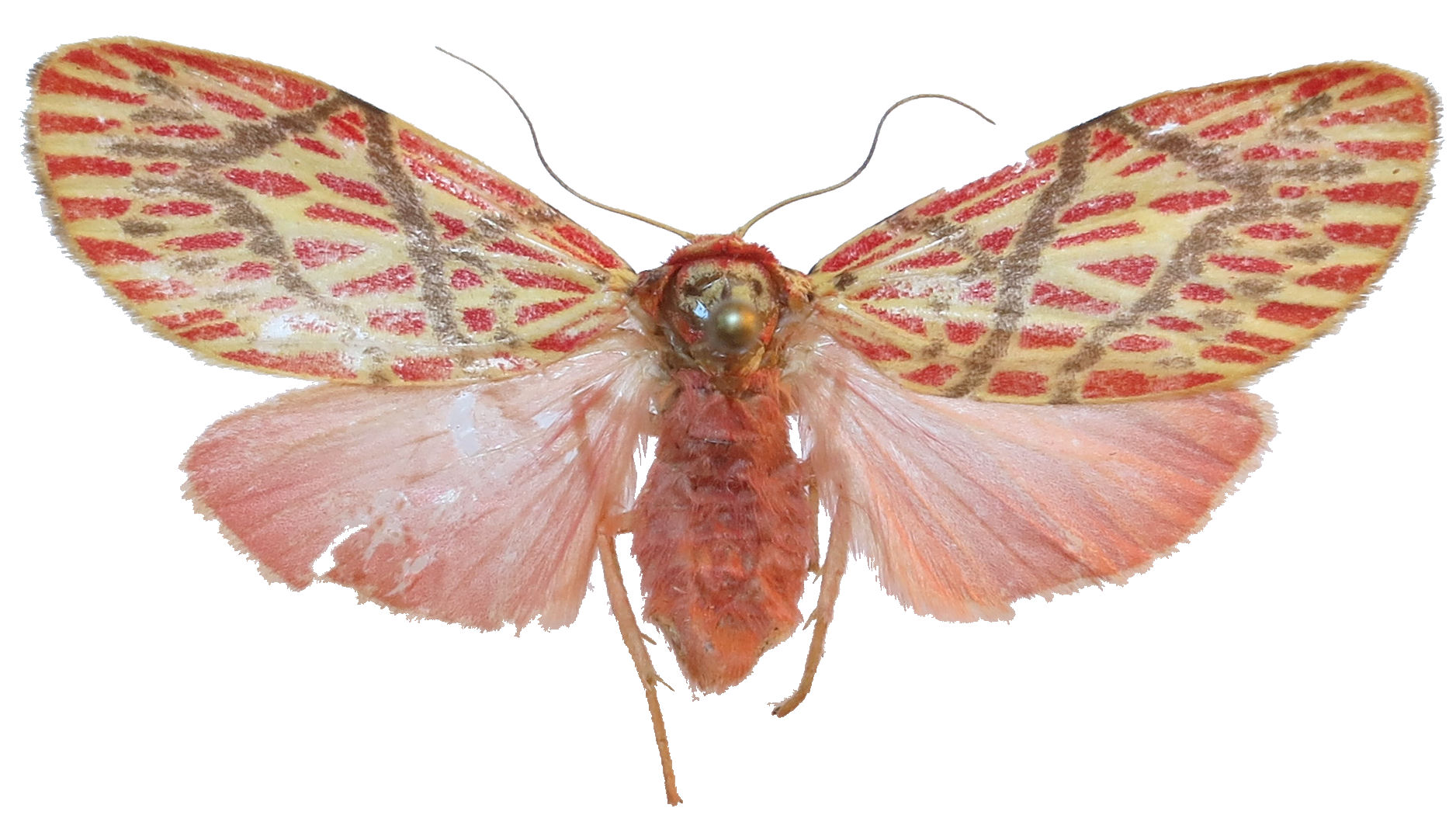
- B. delicia, Bao Loc, Vietnam

Scientific classification
- Domain: Eukaryota
- Kingdom: Animalia
- Phylum: Arthropoda
- Class: Insecta
- Order: Lepidoptera
- Superfamily: Noctuoidea
- Family: Erebidae
- Subfamily: Arctiinae
- Genus: Barsine
- Species: B. delicia

Binomial name
- Barsine delicia C. Swinhoe, 1891

Synonyms
- Barsine delicia (Swinhoe, 1891)

= Barsine delicia =

Species of moth

Barsine delicia is a moth of the family Erebidae. It was described by Charles Swinhoe in 1891. It is found in China, the Indian state of Assam and on the Indonesia island of Sumatra.
