= Barsine defecta =

Scientific classification
- Kingdom: Animalia
- Phylum: Arthropoda
- Class: Insecta
- Order: Lepidoptera
- Superfamily: Noctuoidea
- Family: Erebidae
- Subfamily: Arctiinae
- Genus: Barsine
- Species: B. defecta

Binomial name
- Barsine defecta Walker, 1854

Synonyms
- Miltochrista magna Hampson, 1894; Miltochrista gratiosa Guer: Hampson, 1900; Miltochrista gratiosa defecta Walker, Draudt, 1914; Miltochrista defecta Walker, Kishida, 1993

Species of moth

Barsine defecta is a moth of the family Erebidae first described by Francis Walker in 1854. It is found in Sri Lanka, Nepal, Thailand and Vietnam. It is the type species of genus Barsine.
