= So You Think You Can Dance (American TV series) season 11 =

So You Think You Can Dance
- Season 11
- Hosted by: Cat Deeley
- Judges: Nigel Lythgoe; Mary Murphy
- Winner: Ricky Ubeda
- Runner-up: Valerie Rockey

Release
- Original network: Fox Broadcasting Company
- Original release: May 28 – September 3, 2014

Season chronology
- ← Previous; Season 10 Next → Season 12

So You Think You Can Dance, an American dance competition show, returned for its eleventh season on Wednesday, May 28, 2014. The commission of an eleventh season was first announced by series creator Nigel Lythgoe on the September 10, 2013, telecast of the season 10 finale. The season again features Lythgoe, who also serves as executive producer, and ballroom expert Mary Murphy as the two permanent members of the judge's panel while Cat Deeley continues in her role as host for a tenth consecutive season.

Contemporary contestant Ricky Ubeda won the competition, and his prizes include $250,000, the chance to appear on the cover of Dance Spirit magazine, the offer of a role in the 2014 Broadway revival of the musical On the Town as choreographed by one of this season's guest choreographers, Joshua Bergasse, and the title of America's Favorite Dancer. The runner-up was tap contestant Valerie Rockey. This season saw the show eliminate interactive viewer participation by telephone, with producers preferring to divert weekly voting to the show's website and the network's new proprietary smartphone app, a process that reduced the overall number of votes each participating viewer could cast each week.

–Ubeda and fellow grand finalist Valerie Rockey, who were paired as a couple from the first performance episode, became the twentieth contestants in the show's run never to face elimination from being among the bottom six or bottom four contestants, became the sixteenth contestants to be in the grand finale, became the fourth pair in the show's run never to face elimination from being among the bottom six or bottom four contestants in the grand finale and became the first original couple who were the final two without being in the bottom six or the bottom four and the second season that the top four were never in the danger zone.

== Auditions ==
Open auditions for season 11 were held in five cities beginning on Jan 13.

Air Dates	Audition Venue	City	Audition Date	Guest judges
June 18, 2014	Fox Theatre	Atlanta, Georgia	January 13, 2014	Lil Buck; Jenna Dewan Tatum
June 11, 2014	Merriam Theatre	Philadelphia, Pennsylvania	January 20, 2014	Misty Copeland; Billy Porter
May 28, 2014	Ernest N. Morial Convention Center	New Orleans, Louisiana	January 31, 2014	Wayne Brady
May 28, 2014; June 4, 2014	Oriental Theatre	Chicago, Illinois	February 27, 2014	Jenna Elfman; Fabrice Calmels
June 4, 2014; June 11, 2014	Orpheum Theatre	Los Angeles, California	March 23, 2014	Christina Applegate

== Callbacks ==
In a change from the procedure of the previous nine seasons, in which post-open-audition callbacks were held in Las Vegas and referenced collectively as "Vegas Week", season 11's callbacks were held in Los Angeles, with no special nomenclature. A total of 157 contestants began the week by performing a solo; those contestants not cut at this point went on to learn and perform various styles of choreography with cuts being made after every round. At the end of the final round of the week, 44 contestants remained, from which the judges selected a Top 20 to proceed into the performance show stage of the competition.

Judges
Nigel Lythgoe, Mary Murphy, Adam Shankman, tWitch, Tara Lipinski, Irina Dvorovenko
Task/style	Music	Choreographer(s)	# of contestants participating
Individual solo	Various (chosen by contestant)	The contestant	157
Hip-Hop	"#thatPOWER"—will.i.am	Christopher Scott	121
Jazz	"F for You"—Disclosure feat. Mary J. Blige	Sonya Tayeh	94
Cha-cha	"Timber"—Pitbull feat. Kesha	Dmitry Chaplin and Anya Garnis	65
Contemporary	"Lay Me Down"—Sam Smith	Travis Wall	59
Group routines	Various (selected at random for each group)	The contestants	50
Individual solo	Various (chosen by contestant)	The contestant	44

== Studio Shows ==
=== Top 20 Contestants ===
As with most previous seasons of So You Think You Can Dance, ten female contestants and ten male contestants were selected at the end of the callbacks week to proceed into the performance show stage of the competition.

==== Female Contestants ====
Contestant	Age	Home Town	Dance Style	Elimination date	Placement
Valerie Rockey	20	Indianapolis, Indiana	Tap	September 3, 2014	Runner-up
Jessica Richens	18	Yorba Linda, California	Jazz	September 3, 2014	Third Place
Jacque LeWarne	18	Clive, Iowa	Ballet	August 20, 2014	Top 6
Tanisha Belnap	20	Payson, Utah	Ballroom	August 13, 2014	Top 8
Bridget Whitman	20	Tempe, Arizona	Contemporary	August 6, 2014	Top 10
Carly Blaney	20	Wyckoff, New Jersey	Contemporary	July 30, 2014	Top 14
Emily James	22	North Kingstown, Rhode Island	Contemporary	July 30, 2014	Top 14
Brooklyn Fullmer	18	Provo, Utah	Latin Ballroom	July 23, 2014	Top 16
Jourdan Epstein	24	Plymouth, Minnesota	Ballet	July 16, 2014	Top 18
Malene Ostergaard	25	Aarhus, Denmark	Latin Ballroom	July 9, 2014	Top 20

==== Male Contestants ====
Contestant	Age	Home Town	Dance Style	Elimination date	Placement
Ricky Ubeda	18	Miami, Florida	Contemporary	September 3, 2014	Winner
Zack Everhart	20	Kennesaw, Georgia	Tap	September 3, 2014	Fourth Place
Casey Askew	19	Seattle, Washington	Contemporary	August 20, 2014	Top 6
Rudy Abreu	19	Miami, Florida	Contemporary	August 13, 2014	Top 8
Emilio Dosal	23	Houston, Texas	Popping	August 6, 2014	Top 10
Serge Onik †	26	Upper Saddle River, New Jersey	Latin Ballroom	July 30, 2014	Top 14
Teddy Coffey	19	Rochester, New York	Hip-Hop/Tap	July 30, 2014	Top 14
Marcquet Hill	18	South Jordan, Utah	Latin Ballroom	July 23, 2014	Top 16
Stanley Glover	19	Chicago, Illinois	Contemporary	July 16, 2014	Top 18
Nick Garcia	18	Miami, Florida	Latin Ballroom	July 9, 2014	Top 20

==== Elimination chart ====
Legend
Female	Male	Bottom 6 contestants	Bottom 4 contestants	Eliminated

Week:	7/9	7/16	7/23	7/30	8/6	8/13	8/20	9/3
Contestant	Result							
Ricky Ubeda								Winner
Valerie Rockey								Runner-Up
Jessica Richens				Btm 6				3rd Place
Zack Everhart			Btm 6		Btm 4			4th Place
Casey Askew	Btm 6			Btm 6		Btm 4	Elim	
Jacque LeWarne					Btm 4	Btm 4	Elim	
Rudy Abreu						Elim		
Tanisha Belnap			Btm 6			Elim		
Emilio Dosal		Btm 6			Elim			
Bridget Whitman		Btm 6	Btm 6		Elim			
Serge Onik	Btm 6		Btm 6	Elim				
Carly Blaney				Elim				
Teddy Coffey		Btm 6		Elim				
Emily James		Btm 6		Elim				
Marcquet Hill			Elim					
Brooklyn Fullmer	Btm 6		Elim					
Stanley Glover		Elim						
Jourdan Epstein	Btm 6	Elim						
Nick Garcia	Elim							
Malene Ostergaard	Elim							

=== Performances ===
In contrast with previous seasons, the top 20 showcase, in which all the contestants performed in their own styles, was a competitive and special episode.

==== Meet the Top 20 (July 2, 2014) ====
- Judges: Nigel Lythgoe, Mary Murphy, Jason Derulo
- Guest Performance: Jason Derulo and Snoop Dogg —"Wiggle"
- Performances:

Contestants	Style	Music	Choreographer(s)	Result
Top 20	Jazz	"Stalker Ha"—Kingdom	Sonya Tayeh	
Brooklyn Fullmer; Serge Onik	Cha-cha-cha	"Hell Yeah"—Midnight Red	Dmitry Chaplin	Bottom 6
Emily James; Casey Askew	Contemporary	"All of Me" (Live from Spotify)—John Legend	Travis Wall	Askew in Bottom 6
Valerie Rockey; Zack Everhart	Tap	"Sing"—Ed Sheeran	Anthony Morigerato	Safe
Bridget Whitman; Stanley Glover	Contemporary	"Doesn't Mean Goodbye"—Jon McLaughlin	Bonnie Story	Safe
Jourdan Epstein; Jacque LeWarne	Ballet	"Pas de Deux - Black Swan - Tchaikovsky"—Richard Bonynge & The London Symphony Orchestra	Marat Daukayev	Epstein in Bottom 6
Malene Ostergaard; Marcquet Hill	Samba	"Morning Drums"—Gregor Salto	Louis van Amstel	Ostergaard eliminated
Carly Blaney; Rudy Abreu	Contemporary	"Take It Easy"—Jetta	Stacey Tookey	Safe
Emilio Dosal; Teddy Coffey	Hip-hop	"Nightshift"—Commodores	Christopher Scott	Safe
Jessica Richens; Ricky Ubeda	Contemporary	"Vow"—Meredith Monk	Sonya Tayeh	Safe
Tanisha Belnap; Nick Garcia	Cha-cha-cha	"I'm a Freak"—Enrique Iglesias feat. Pitbull	Louis van Amstel	Garcia eliminated

==== Top 20 (July 9, 2014) ====
- Group Dance: "New York, New York" from On the Town (Broadway; Choreographer: Joshua Bergasse)
- Judges: Nigel Lythgoe, Mary Murphy, Misty Copeland
- Performances:

Couple	Style	Music	Choreographer(s)	Result
Tanisha Belnap; Rudy Abreu	Jazz	"You Need"—Bengsons	Sonya Tayeh	Safe
Valerie Rockey; Ricky Ubeda	Contemporary	"Oh Darling"—Gossling	Travis Wall	Safe
Bridget Whitman; Emilio Dosal	Hip-hop	"Work"—Iggy Azalea	Luther Brown	Bottom 6
Jessica Richens; ~~Nick Garcia~~	West Coast Swing	"Respect" (Live Feb. 5, 1971)—Aretha Franklin	Benji Schwimmer	Richens Safe
Carly Blaney; Serge Onik	Contemporary	"Latch (Acoustic)"—Sam Smith	Sonya Tayeh	Safe
Emily James; Teddy Coffey	Hip-hop	"Don't"—Ed Sheeran	Dave Scott	Bottom 6
~~Malene Ostergaard~~; Stanley Glover	Broadway	"I've Got Your Number"—Nancy Wilson	Spencer Liff	Glover Eliminated
Jourdan Epstein; Marcquet Hill	Pop Jazz	"Work Bitch"—Britney Spears	Sean Cheesman	Epstein Eliminated
Brooklyn Fullmer; Casey Askew	Argentine Tango	"Gallo Ciego"—Luis Bravo's Forever Tango	Miriam Larici; Leonardo Barrionuevo	Safe
Jacque LeWarne; Zack Everhart	African Jazz	"Dibiza" (Kick Ass Mix)—Danny Tenagila	Sean Cheesman	Safe

==== Top 18 (July 16, 2014) ====
- Group Dance: "How It's Done"—District 78 (Hip-hop; Choreographers: Christopher "Pharside" Jennings and Krystal "Phoenix" Meraz)
- Judges: Nigel Lythgoe, Mary Murphy, Misty Copeland
- Guest Performance: A Great Big World - Say Something
- Performances:

Couple	Style	Music	Choreographer(s)	Result
Jacque LeWarne; Zack Everhart	Lyrical Hip-hop	"Stay With Me"—Sam Smith	Keone Madrid; Mari Madrid	Everhart Bottom 6
~~Jourdan Epstein~~; Marcquet Hill	Contemporary	"Disappear" (Demo Version)—Mikky Ekko	Dee Caspery	Hill eliminated
Jessica Richens; ~~Stanley Glover~~	Jazz	"Funkier Than a Mosquito's Tweeter"—Nikka Costa	Tyce Diorio	Safe
Bridget Whitman; Emilio Dosal	Jive	"Happy"—Pharrell Williams	Anya Garnis; Pasha Kovalev	Whitman Bottom 6
Emily James; Teddy Coffey	Contemporary	"Ne me quitte pas"—Nina Simone	Tyce Diorio	Safe
Brooklyn Fullmer; Casey Askew	Jazz	"Crazy Little Thing Called Love"—Michael Bublé	Bonnie Story	Fullmer eliminated
Valerie Rockey; Ricky Ubeda	Viennese Waltz	"I Won't Give Up"—Jason Mraz	Lacey Schwimmer	Safe
Carly Blaney; Serge Onik	Hip-hop	"Senile"—Young Money feat. Tyga, Nicki Minaj & Lil Wayne	Luther Brown	Onik Bottom 6
Tanisha Belnap; Rudy Abreu	Broadway	"Sing Sing Sing (Part 2)"—Bob Fosse	Warren Carlyle	Belnap Bottom 6

==== Top 16 (July 23, 2014) ====
- Group Dance: "Take Me to the River"—Annie Lenox (Jazz; Choreographer: Mandy Moore)
- Judges: Nigel Lythgoe, Mary Murphy, Misty Copeland
- Guest Performance: Lucy Hale—"Lie a Little Better"

Couple	Style	Music	Choreographer(s)	Result
Valerie Rockey; Ricky Ubeda	Bollywood	"Dilliwaali Girlfriend"—Yeh Jawaani Hai Deewani (soundtrack)	Nakul Dev Mahajan	Safe
Bridget Whitman; Emilio Dosal	Contemporary	"The Leaving Song"—Chris Garneau	Travis Wall	Safe
Tanisha Belnap; Rudy Abreu	Hip-hop	"Good Kisser"—Usher	Dave Scott	Safe
Jessica Richens; ~~Marcquet Hill~~	Foxtrot	"I Put a Spell on You"—Nina Simone	Dmitry Chaplin	Richens Bottom 6
Carly Blaney; Serge Onik	Contemporary	"Foolish Games"—Jewel	Mandy Moore	Both eliminated
Emily James; Teddy Coffey	Salsa	"Bruk It Down" (Soca Remix)—Mr. Vegas feat. Alison Hinds	Oksana Dmytrenko; Jonathan Platero	Both eliminated
Jacque LeWarne; Zack Everhart	Jazz	"Back to Black"—Beyoncé feat. André 3000	Sonya Tayeh	Safe
~~Brooklyn Fullmer~~; Casey Askew	Hip-hop	"Hustle Hard Remix"—Ace Hood feat. Rick Ross & Lil Wayne	Will "WilldaBeast" Adams	Askew Bottom 6
~~Brooklyn Fullmer~~; Casey Askew; Emilio Dosal; Emily James; Serge Onik; Tanisha Belnap; Valerie Rockey; Zack Everhart Jr.	Contemporary	"So Broken" (Live)—Björk	Sonya Tayeh	N/A
Bridget Whitman; Carly Blaney; Jacque LeWarne; Jessica Richens; ~~Marcquet Hill~~; Ricky Ubeda; Rudy Abreu; Teddy Coffey	Jazz	"Love Runs Out"—OneRepublic	Travis Wall	N/A

==== Top 14 (July 30, 2014) ====
- Group Dance: "Last Moment"—Christophe Filippi (Contemporary; Choreographer: Stacey Tookey)
- Judges: Nigel Lythgoe, Mary Murphy, Christina Applegate

Couple	Style	Music	Choreographer(s)	Result
Bridget Whitman; Emilio Dosal	Jazz	"Long Road to Hell"—Avicii	Ray Leeper	Both Eliminated
Tanisha Belnap; Rudy Abreu	Contemporary	"Seduces Me"—Celine Dion	Mandy Moore	Safe
Jacque LeWarne; Zack Everhart	Paso Doble	"Dragula"—Rob Zombie	Jean-Marc Généreux	Bottom 4
~~Emily James~~; ~~Teddy Coffey~~	Broadway	"From This Moment On" from Kiss Me, Kate	Warren Carlyle	
Jessica Richens; Casey Askew	Contemporary	"Like Real People Do"—Hozier	Travis Wall	Safe
~~Carly Blaney~~; ~~Serge Onik~~	Quickstep	"A Cool Cat in Town"—Tape Five feat. Brenda Boykin	Jean-Marc Généreux	
Valerie Rockey; Ricky Ubeda	Hip-hop	"Turn Down for What"—DJ Snake & Lil Jon	Christopher "Pharside" Jennings; Krystal "Phoenix" Meraz	Safe
Top 7 Female Contestants	Contemporary	"My Immortal"—Evanescence	Mandy Moore	N/A
Top 7 Male Contestants	Contemporary	"Wave"—Beck	Travis Wall	N/A

- Solos:

Contestant	Style	Music	Result
Serge Onik	Cha-cha-cha	"Wicked Games" (Radio Edit)—Parra for Cuva feat. Anna Naklab	Eliminated
Carly Blaney	Contemporary	"Not About Angels"—Birdy	Eliminated
Casey Askew	Contemporary	"Kiss Me"—Ed Sheeran	Safe
Emily James	Contemporary	"Infra 8"—Fuller, Bonner, Barr, Burdge & Worsey	Eliminated
Teddy Coffey	Hip-hop	"If I Ever Fall in Love" (original a cappella version)—Shai	Eliminated
Jessica Richens	Jazz	"Fever"—Beyoncé Knowles	Safe

==== Top 10 (August 6, 2014) ====
- Group Dance: "Bang Bang"—Jessie J, Ariana Grande and Nicki Minaj (Hip-hop; Choreographer: Jamal Sims)
- Judges: Nigel Lythgoe, Mary Murphy, Tara Lipinski
- Guest Performance: Christina Perri—"Burning Gold"

Contestants	Style	Music	Choreographer(s)	Result
~~Bridget Whitman~~; Brandon Bryant	Bollywood/Disco	"Disco Khisko" (Remix) from Dil Bole Hadippa	Nakul Dev Mahajan	
Tanisha Belnap; Ryan Di Lello	Argentine Tango	"The Gaucho's Pain"—Tango Jointz	Miriam Larici; Leonardo Barrionuevo	Eliminated
~~Emilio Dosal~~; Jasmine Harper	Hip-hop	"Get Low"—Dillon Francis	Tabitha D'umo; Napoleon D'umo	
Valerie Rockey; Ade Obayomi	Jazz	"Hearts a Mess"—Gotye	Tyce Diorio	Safe
Rudy Abreu; Jenna Johnson	Cha-Cha-Cha	"Maps"—Maroon 5	Louis Van Amstel	Eliminated
Jacque LeWarne; Chehon Wespi-Tschopp	Contemporary Ballet	"Adagio for TRON"—Daft Punk	Travis Wall	Bottom 4
Ricky Ubeda; Lauren Froderman	Rockabilly Jazz	"Bossa Nova Baby" (Viva Remix)—Elvis Presley	Mandy Moore	Safe
Casey Askew; Kathryn McCormick	Broadway	"Maybe This Time"—Liza Minnelli	Spencer Liff	Bottom 4
Jessica Richens; Stephen "tWitch" Boss	Hip-hop	"U Got Me Up" (Underground Goodie Mix '93)—Cajmere feat. Dajae	Tabitha D'umo; Napoleon D'umo	Safe
Zack Everhart; Amy Yakima	Contemporary	"Europe, After The Rain"—Max Richter	Sonya Tayeh	Safe

==== Top 8 (August 13, 2014) ====
- Group Dance: "A Place With No Name"—Michael Jackson (Hip-hop; Choreographer: Travis Payne)
- Judges: Nigel Lythgoe, Mary Murphy, Jenna Dewan Tatum

Contestants	Style	Music	Choreographer(s)	Result
Ricky Ubeda; Jaimie Goodwin	Contemporary	"Smile"— Michael Jackson	Travis Wall	Safe
Valerie Rockey; Ryan Di Lello	Samba	"Wanna Be Startin' Somethin'"—Michael Jackson	Jean-Marc Généreux	Safe
Casey Askew; Comfort Fedoke	Hip-hop	"Xscape"—Michael Jackson	Christopher "Pharside" Jennings; Krystal "Phoenix" Meraz	Eliminated
~~Tanisha Belnap~~; Nick Lazzarini	Contemporary	"She's Out of My Life"— Michael Jackson	Stacey Tookey	
~~Rudy Abreu~~; Allison Holker	Jazz	"Dirty Diana"—Michael Jackson	Ray Leeper	
Zack Everhart; Mackenzie Dustman	Broadway	"The Way You Make Me Feel"—Michael Jackson	Spencer Liff	Safe
Jacque LeWarne; Stephen "tWitch" Boss	Hip-hop	"Slave to the Rhythm"—Michael Jackson	Dave Scott	Eliminated
Jessica Richens; Will Wingfield	Contemporary	"Earth Song"—Michael Jackson	Mandy Moore	Safe

- Top 8 contestants' solos:

Contestant	Style	Music
Tanisha Belnap	Ballroom	"Warrior"—Havana Brown
Zack Everhart	Tap	"Gotta Get Thru This" (Acoustic Version)—Daniel Bedingfield
Casey Askew	Contemporary	"Outro"—M83
Rudy Abreu	Contemporary	"Warrior"—Drehz
Jacque LeWarne	Ballet	"Nocturne in C Sharp Minor, (Op. Posth.): Lento"—Dejan Lazic & Pieter Wispelwey
Jessica Richens	Jazz	"Taking Chances"—Celine Dion
Valerie Rockey	Tap	"Dance with Me Tonight"—Olly Murs
Ricky Ubeda	Contemporary	"Hægt, kemur ljósið"—Ólafur Arnalds

==== Top 6 (August 20, 2014) ====
- Group Dance: "Hide (Tropkillaz Remix)"—N.A.S.A feat. Aynzil Jones (Hip-hop; Choreographer: Nick Demoura)
- Judges: Nigel Lythgoe, Mary Murphy, Christina Applegate
- Guest Performance: Rixton — "Me and My Broken Heart"

Couple	Style	Music	Choreographer(s)
Valerie Rockey; Ricky Ubeda	Broadway	"I've Got the World on a String"—Frank Sinatra	Spencer Liff
Jessica Richens; ~~Casey Askew~~	Disco	"Dim All the Lights"—Donna Summer	Doriana Sanchez
~~Jacque LeWarne~~; Zack Everhart Jr.	Foxtrot	"Anything Goes"—Tony Bennett & Lady Gaga	Jean-Marc Généreux
Valerie Rockey; Stephen "tWitch" Boss	Hip-hop	"Yeah"—Usher feat. Lil Jon & Ludacris	Will "Willdabeast" Adams
~~Jacque LeWarne~~; Will Wingfield	Contemporary	"99 Red Balloons"—Sleeping At Last	Sean Cheesman
Jessica Richens; Ade Obayomi	Jazz	"Boneless"—Steve Aoki, Chris Lake & Tujamo	Ray Leeper
Ricky Ubeda; Anya Garnis	Cha-Cha-Cha	"Dare (La La La)"—Shakira	Jean-Marc Généreux
~~Casey Askew~~; Makenzie Dustman	Contemporary	"Over You"—Ingrid Michaelson feat. A Great Big World	Stacey Tookey
Zack Everhart; Du-Shaunt "Fik-Shun" Stegall	Hip-hop	"Sail" (Unlimited Gravity Remix)—Awolnation	Phillip Chbeeb (season 5)

- Top 6 contestant's solos:

Contestant	Style	Music
Ricky Ubeda	Contemporary	"My Tears Are Becoming A Sea"—M83
Jessica Richens	Jazz/Contemporary	"I Was Here"—Beyoncé
Casey Askew	Contemporary	"Lay Me Down" (Acoustic Version)—Sam Smith
Valerie Rockey	Tap	"What I Like About You"—The Romantics
Jacque LeWarne	Ballet	"Boogie Woogie Bugle Boy"—The Andrews Sisters
Zack Everhart	Tap	"Butterfly"—Jason Mraz

==== Top 4 (August 27, 2014) ====
- Group Dance: "Wind Beneath My Wings"—RyanDan (Contemporary; Choreographer: Travis Wall)
- Judges: Nigel Lythgoe, Mary Murphy, Jesse Tyler Ferguson
- Guest Performance: Jason Mraz—"Love Someone"

Couple	Style	Music	Choreographer(s)
Valerie Rockey; Ricky Ubeda	African Jazz	"Voices of Savannah"—DJ Chus	Sean Cheesman
Jessica Richens; Zack Everhart Jr.	Broadway	"Hernando's Hideaway"—Ella Fitzgerald	Spencer Liff
Valerie Rockey; Zack Everhart	Contemporary	"Pearls"—Sade	Tyce Diorio
Jessica Richens; Ricky Ubeda	Jazz	"F for You"—Disclosure feat. Mary J. Blige	Ray Leeper
Jessica Richens; Valerie Rockey	Bollywood	"Ghaghra"—Yeh Jawaani Hai Deewani (Soundtrack)	Nakul Dev Mahajan
Ricky Ubeda; Zack Everhart Jr.	Hip-hop	"The Antidote"—District 78	Chris "Pharside" Jennings; Krystal "Phoenix" Meraz
Valerie Rockey; Aaron Turner	Tap	"Love Me or Leave Me"—Sammy Davis Jr.	Anthony Morigerato
Ricky Ubeda; Kathryn McCormick	Contemporary	"Not About Angels"—Birdy	Stacey Tookey
Zack Everhart; Aaron Turner	Tap	"Piano Man"—Billy Joel	Anthony Morigerato
Jessica Richens; Robert Roldan	Contemporary	"When I Go"—Over the Rhine	Travis Wall

- Top 4 contestant's solos:

Contestant	Style	Music
Ricky Ubeda	Contemporary	"Skin & Bones"—David J. Roch
Jessica Richens	Jazz	"It's a Man's Man's Man's World"—Juliet Simms
Valerie Rockey	Tap	"Valerie"—Mark Ronson feat. Amy Winehouse
Zack Everhart	Tap	"Superstition"—Adam Rafferty

==== Week 10 (Finale) (September 3, 2014) ====
- Judges: Nigel Lythgoe, Mary Murphy, Debbie Allen, Adam Shankman, Jenna Dewan-Tatum, Tara Lipinski
- Guest Music Performance: Enrique Iglesias and Sean Paul - "Bailando"
- Group dances & guest performers:

Contestants and Guest(s)	Style	Music	Choreographer
Top 20	Broadway	"Doctor Jazz"—Jelly's Last Jam (1992 Original Broadway Cast)	Warren Carlyle
Top 10/All-stars	Contemporary/Hip-hop	"Sweet Disposition"—The Temper Trap	Sonya Tayeh & Christopher Scott
Wanted Ashiqz	Bollywood dance/Hip-hop	"Dhoom Again" from Dhoom 2	Themselves
Michael Dameski^{1}	Contemporary	"Unstoppable"—E.S. Posthumus	Himself
Les Twins	Hip-hop	"Fading Flower"—Yuna	Themselves

^1 Michael Dameski is the winner of So You Think You Can Dance Australia's fourth season.

===== Judges & grand-finalists' picks =====
Couple	Style	Music	Choreographer	Chosen by
Jessica Richens; Casey Askew	Contemporary	"Like Real People Do"—Hozier	Travis Wall	Mary Murphy
Valerie Rockey; Ricky Ubeda	Hip-hop	"Turn Down for What"—DJ Snake & Lil Jon	Christopher 'Pharside' Jennings; Krystal 'Phoenix' Meraz	Debbie Allen
Zack Everhart; Amy Yakima	Contemporary	"Europe, After The Rain"—Max Richter	Sonya Tayeh	Zack Everhart Jr.
Rudy Abreu; Allison Holker	Jazz	"Dirty Diana"—Michael Jackson	Ray Leeper	Nigel Lythgoe
Valerie Rockey; Zack Everhart	Tap	"Sing"—Ed Sheeran	Anthony Morigerato	Valerie Rockey
Jessica Richens; Ricky Ubeda	Contemporary	"Vow"—Meredith Monk	Sonya Tayeh	Ricky Ubeda
Carly Blaney; Serge Onik	Hip-hop	"Senile"—Young Money feat. Tyga, Nicki Minaj & Lil Wayne	Luther Brown	Viewers
Tanisha Belnap; Rudy Abreu	Jazz	"You Need"—The Bengsons	Sonya Tayeh	Jenna Dewan-Tatum
Ricky Ubeda; Zack Everhart Jr	Hip-hop	"The Antidote"—District 78	Christopher 'Pharside' Jennings; Krystal 'Phoenix' Meraz	Adam Shankman
Emilio Dosal; Jasmine Harper	Hip-hop	"Get Low"—Dillon Francis	Tabitha and Napoleon D'Umo	Tara Lipinski
Jessica Richens; Robert Roldan	Contemporary	"When I Go"—Over the Rhine	Travis Wall	Jessica Richens
Valerie Rockey; Ricky Ubeda	Contemporary	"Oh Darling"—Gossling	Travis Wall	Cat Deeley

=== All-Stars Dance Pool ===
All-Stars, Contestant Partners, and Results
All Star				Contestant				
Season	Former Contestant	Dance Styles	Placement	Week 5	Week 6	Week 7	Week 8	
1	Nick Lazzarini	Contemporary	Winner		Tanisha			
2	Allison Holker	Contemporary	Top 8		Rudy			
3	Anya Garnis	Latin Ballroom	Top 12			Ricky		
3	Jaimie Goodwin	Contemporary	Top 10		Ricky			
4	Stephen "tWitch" Boss	Hip-hop	Runner-up	Jessica	Jacque	Valerie		
4	Comfort Fedoke	Hip-hop	Top 8		Casey			
4	Will Wingfield	Modern	Top 8		Jessica	Jacque		
5	Brandon Bryant	Contemporary/Modern	Runner-up	Bridget				
5	Ade Obayomi	Contemporary	Top 6	Valerie		Jessica		
6	Ryan Di Lello	Ballroom/Latin	Top 6	Tanisha	Valerie			
6	Kathryn McCormick	Contemporary	Top 3	Casey			Ricky	
7	Lauren Froderman	Contemporary	Winner	Ricky				
7	Robert Roldan	Contemporary/Jazz	Top 3				Jessica	
9	Chehon Wespi-Tschopp	Ballet	Male Winner	Jacque				
10	Makenzie Dustman	Contemporary	Top 10		Zack	Casey		
10	Jasmine Harper	Contemporary/Hip-hop	Female Runner-up	Emilio				
10	Jenna Johnson	Latin/Ballroom	Top 8	Rudy				
10	Du-Shaunt "Fik-Shun" Stegall	Hip-hop	Male Winner			Zack		
10	Amy Yakima	Contemporary	Female Winner	Zack				
10	Aaron Turner	Tap	Male Runner-Up				Valerie	Zack

This contestant was eliminated this week.
This contestant was in the bottom 4 this week.
This contestant won the competition.
This contestant runner-up.

== Ratings ==
=== U.S. Nielsen ratings ===
Show	Episode	First air date	Rating (18–49)	Share (18–49)	Viewers (millions)
1	Auditions: New Orleans and Chicago	May 28, 2014	1.6	5	5.33
2	Auditions: Chicago and Los Angeles	June 4, 2014	1.5	5	5.06
3	Auditions: Los Angeles and Philadelphia	June 11, 2014	1.3	5	4.42
4	Auditions: Atlanta	June 18, 2014	1.7	6	5.32
5	Callbacks and Top 20 Revealed	June 25, 2014	1.4	5	4.38
6	Top 20 Showcase	July 2, 2014	1.4	5	4.03
7	Top 20 Perform	July 9, 2014	1.2	4	3.74
8	Top 18 Perform	July 16, 2014	1.0	4	3.70
9	Top 16 Perform	July 23, 2014	1.1	4	3.75
10	Top 14 Perform	July 30, 2014	1.1	4	3.53
11	Top 10 Perform	August 6, 2014	1.1	4	3.71
12	Top 8 Perform	August 13, 2014	1.0	3	3.48
13	Top 6 Perform	August 20, 2014	0.9	3	3.45
14	Top 4 Perform	August 27, 2014	1.1	4	3.68
15	Finale	September 3, 2014	1.3	5	4.12

== See also ==
- List of So You Think You Can Dance finalists
