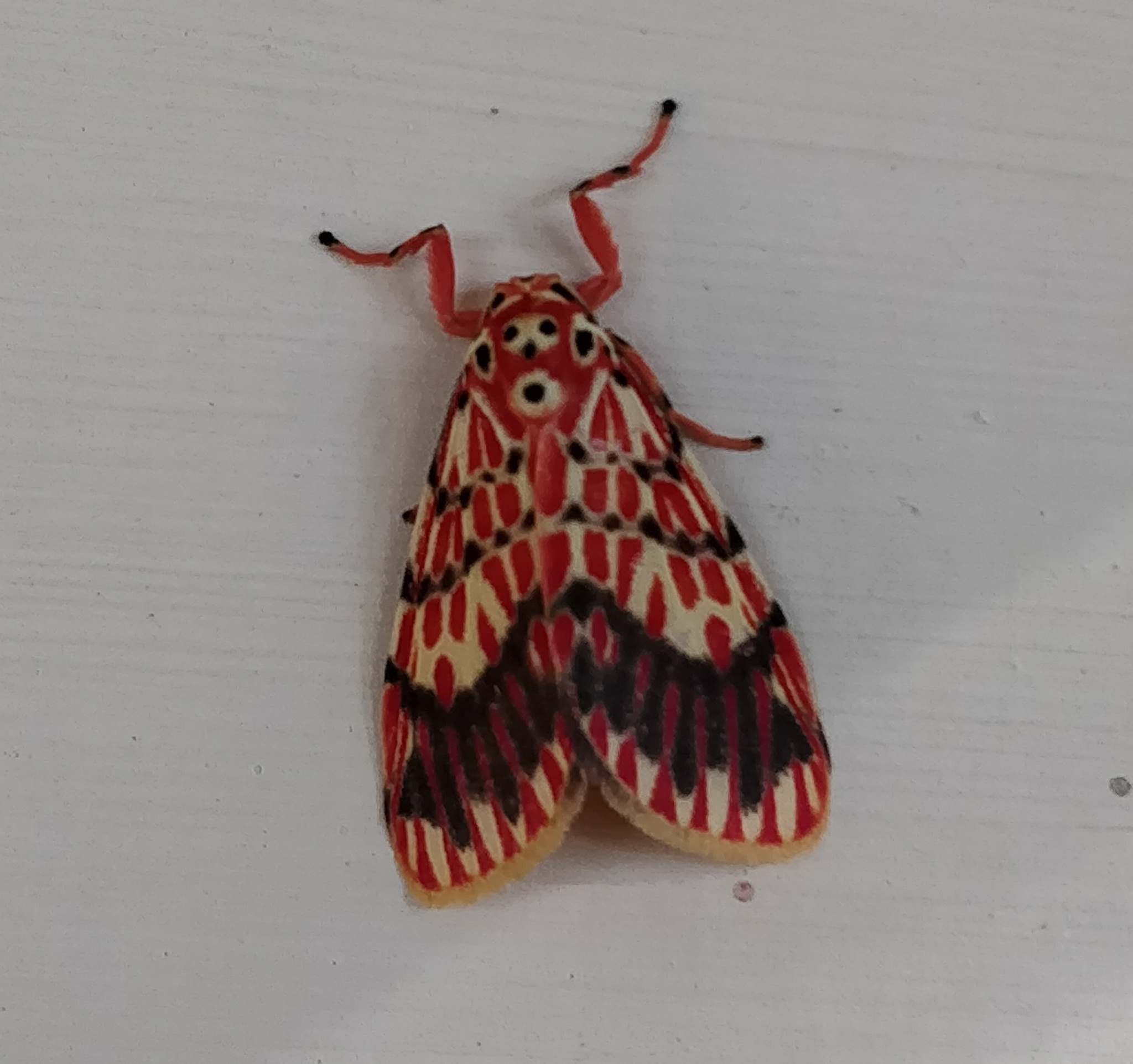
- Barsine gratiosa, India

Scientific classification
- Kingdom: Animalia
- Phylum: Arthropoda
- Clade: Pancrustacea
- Class: Insecta
- Order: Lepidoptera
- Superfamily: Noctuoidea
- Family: Erebidae
- Subfamily: Arctiinae
- Tribe: Lithosiini
- Subtribe: Nudariina
- Genus: Barsine
- Species: B. gratiosa

Binomial name
- Barsine gratiosa (Guérin-Méneville, 1843)

Synonyms
- Miltochrista gratiosa Guérin-Méneville, 1843

= Barsine gratiosa =

Species of moth

Barsine gratiosa is a species of lichen moth in the family Erebidae, found in India and southern Asia.
