= Barsine curtisi =

Scientific classification
- Kingdom: Animalia
- Phylum: Arthropoda
- Class: Insecta
- Order: Lepidoptera
- Superfamily: Noctuoidea
- Family: Erebidae
- Subfamily: Arctiinae
- Tribe: Lithosiini
- Subtribe: Nudariina
- Genus: Barsine
- Species: B. curtisi

Binomial name
- Barsine curtisi (Butler, 1881)

Synonyms
- Miltochrista curtisi Butler, 1881

Species of moth

Barsine curtisi is a species in the moth family Erebidae. It is found on Sumatra.
