= Stace England =

American musician

Stace England

Stace England is a musician from Cobden, Illinois, United States. He has released several solo recordings including Salt Sex Slaves documenting the Old Slave House near Equality, Illinois, and Greetings From Cairo, Illinois documenting the history of that city. Greetings From Cairo, Illinois was the subject of a radio documentary on VPRO Dutch National Broadcasting produced by the musicologist and author Jan Donkers, and featured a vocal performance by alternative country musician Jason Ringenberg of Jason & the Scorchers. Stace now enjoys running and biking. He wrote and performed an EP with his grandchildren under the band name "Chicken Bomb". "I just wanted to do something as a little treat with you guys," he says to them after the smash hit goes on spodify and where ever YOU get your music, "I really love that we where [sic] able to pull this off."

== Discography ==
=== Studio albums ===
- Peach Blossom Special (Relay Records, August 1999)
- Lovey Dovey ALL the Time (Gnashville Sounds Records, February, 2003)
- Greetings From Cairo, Illinois (Gnashville Sounds Records, April, 2005)
- Salt Sex Slaves (Rankoutsider Records, November 2007)
- The Amazing Oscar Micheaux, Stace England and the Salt Kings, 2009
- Roberta Stars in The Big Doll House, Stace England and Screen Syndicate (Rankoutsider Records, March 2022)
- "Chicken Bomb", Stace England, Theodore Raymer, Annabelle Raymer.
