= Casimir Pulaski Day (song) =

2005 Sufjan Stevens song

Song by Sufjan Stevens

from the album Illinois
- Released: July 4, 2005
- Length: 5:53
- Label: Asthmatic Kitty/Secretly Canadian and Rough Trade
- Songwriter: Sufjan Stevens
- Producer: Sufjan Stevens

"Casimir Pulaski Day" is a track from Sufjan Stevens' 2005 concept album Illinois, released on Asthmatic Kitty. The song's title is a reference to the holiday Casimir Pulaski Day celebrated in Illinois on the first Monday in March. In the song, the narrator grapples with the loss of his romantic partner, who dies of bone cancer on the titular holiday, deals with the grief that follows, and questions his faith in God.

== Production ==
The album Illinois is the second of two albums in Stevens' Fifty States Project, following Michigan released in 2003. When writing the music for the album, Stevens extensively researched the people and history of Illinois, reading Illinois authors, histories, and seeking anecdotes about the state on internet chatrooms. Stevens said the songs on Illinois are a mixture of fiction and autobiographical story-telling, "extracting particular events from my life, my memory, and transplanting them in the landscape of Illinois".

The song "Casimir Pulaski Day" tells the story of teenage love ending in the death of the narrator's friend from bone cancer. The song is musically simpler than other songs on the album, with relatively minimalist instrumentation, most of the track consisting only of vocals, guitar, and banjo. The same four chords are strummed on guitar throughout. The lyrics are a series of memories of the narrator's romance, the death of his lover, and his questioning of his faith in God.

== Themes ==
Stevens is known for his exploration of broad human themes through a Christian lens. Throughout the song, the singer praises "All the glory that the Lord has made" while he grapples with the death of his friend, leading to a confrontation and a questioning of God. The tension between death and glory brings up questions from theodicy.

== Reception ==
A review of Illinois in the Chicago Reader called the song "painfully poignant". Reviewers have praised the song for its awkward adolescent innocence juxtaposed with the cruelty of untimely death.
