= Chicago (Sufjan Stevens song) =

2005 Sufjan Stevens song

- Demo artwork

Song by Sufjan Stevens

from the album Illinois
- Language: English
- Released: July 5, 2005
- Genre: Indie folk; baroque pop
- Length: 6:04
- Label: Asthmatic Kitty
- Songwriter: Sufjan Stevens
- Producer: Sufjan Stevens

Audio video
- "Chicago" on YouTube

"Chicago" ("Go! CHICAGO! Go! Yeah!" on the vinyl edition) is a track from Sufjan Stevens 2005 concept album Illinois, released on Asthmatic Kitty. The song tells the semi-autobiographical story of a young man on a road trip, and his youthful idealism. The track is one of Stevens' most popular songs, and he usually ends his live shows with a version of this song. The song has been recorded in five different versions by Stevens himself, the versions not on Illinois being included on the collection The Avalanche, and one demo released digitally on Stevens' website, later released as a 12" single bundled with the Illinois: Special 10th Anniversary Blue Marvel Edition.

== Production ==
In the process of making the second album in his ambitious Fifty States Project, which involved recording an album for each of the states of America, Stevens had committed a large amount of time to researching the people and history of Illinois. However this track is one of the most autobiographical on the album. Sufjan Stevens stated the following in an interview around the release: "I've had quite a few exceptional and traumatic experiences in Illinois, a few times when visiting Chicago at a particularly difficult time in my life or driving cross country and being pulled over by the cops just outside Peoria," and also added that he had seen his first rock show there. However, he qualified the story of the song as only being partly true, stating, "The writer is the inventor, the designer, the creative force behind a body of work. The author is the actual man or woman, in reality, in society, in person. I like Woody Allen the director/writer, circa 1975, but I doubt I would like Woody Allen the person, circa 1975." Stevens also cited the poem "Chicago" by Carl Sandburg as an influence on the track, and had intended to include a track about Saul Bellow on Illinois, but could not find a way to adequately cover the writer.

== Alternate versions ==
The year after the track was released on Illinois, three further versions were included on the outtakes album, The Avalanche: Outtakes and Extras from the Illinois Album, these being an acoustic version, the "Adult Contemporary Easy Listening Version", which is a baroque pop version of the original track, and a "Multiple Personality Disorder Version", of which Stevens stated: "James, my drummer was in town, and we decided it would be kind of fun to deconstruct the song". One further demo version was recorded during the album recording sessions in 2004 and released digitally on Stevens' homepage on February 25, 2016. It was released as a 12" bundled with the Illinois: Special 10th Anniversary Blue Marvel Edition on April 1, 2016.

== Reception ==
The track was well received as the centerpiece of the acclaimed album Illinois. Allmusic described the track as having "an expansiveness that radiates with the ballast of history and the promise of new beginnings", and the track was included as one of the Pitchfork 500 most important tracks since punk broke.

== In other media ==
The track was sampled by Chiddy Bang on their single "All Things Go" as well as featuring a shortened version as the opening theme for the Netflix show The Politician.

The demo version of the song is featured in The Bear episode "Review". In the episode, the song is introduced by WXRT DJ Lin Brehmer and is played over the opening credits.

"Chicago" was also featured in the 2006 film Little Miss Sunshine and 2014 film Veronica Mars.

The annual All Things Go Music Festival takes its name from the song.

The song and Stevens are named in the third verse of Snow Patrol's 2006 song "Hands Open".

== Personnel ==
Credits adapted from the liner notes of Illinois:

- Julianne Carney – violin
- Tom Eaton, Jeniffer Hoover, Katrina Kerns, Beccy Lock, Tara McDonnell – choir
- Maria Beller Jeffers – cello
- James McAlister – drums
- Craig Montoro – trumpet
- Rob Moose – violin
- Sufjan Stevens – vocals, wurlitzer, bass guitar, vibraphone, piano, sleigh bells, tambourine, shaker, arrangement, production
- Alan Douches – mastering

== Certifications ==
Region	Certification	Certified units/sales
United States (RIAA)	Gold	500,000^{‡}
^{‡} Sales+streaming figures based on certification alone.
