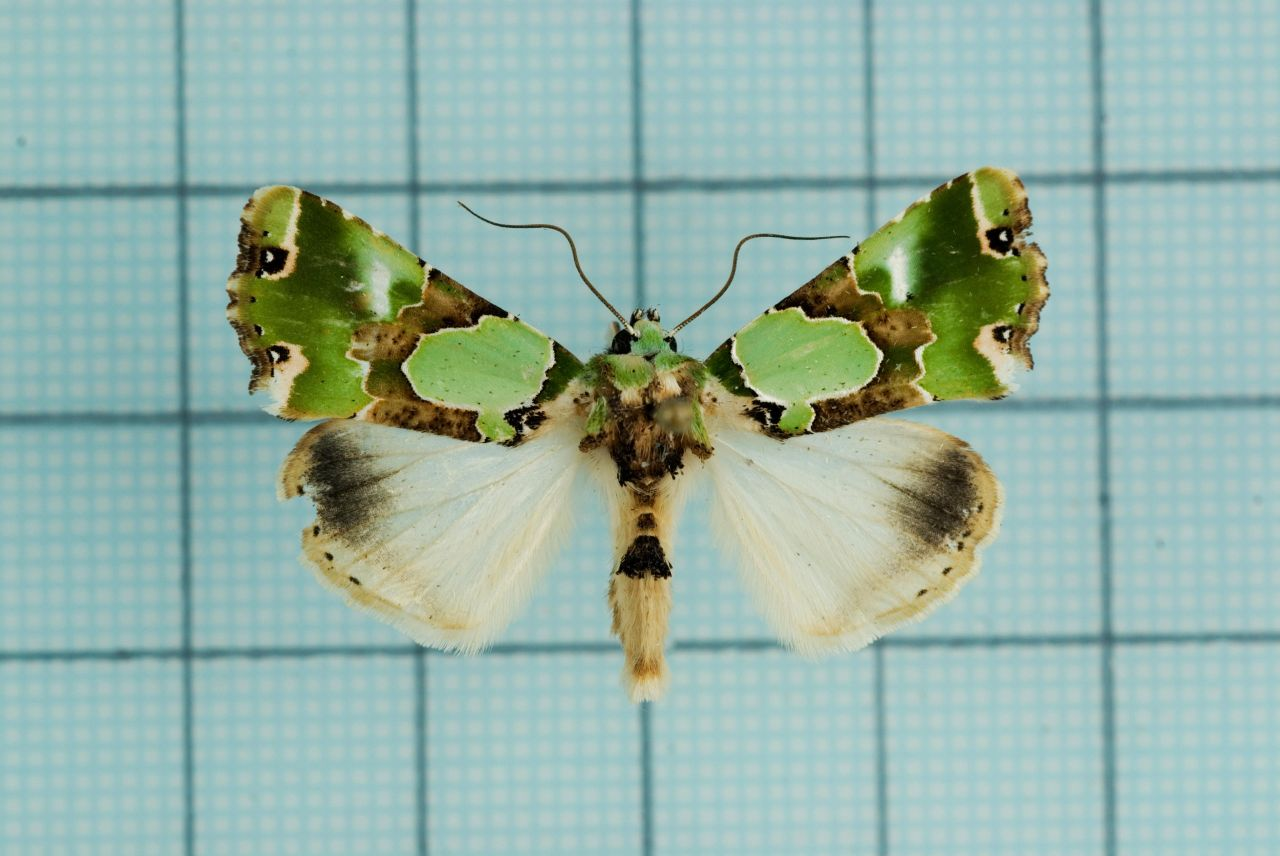
- Nacna buschmannferenci

Scientific classification
- Domain: Eukaryota
- Kingdom: Animalia
- Phylum: Arthropoda
- Class: Insecta
- Order: Lepidoptera
- Superfamily: Noctuoidea
- Family: Noctuidae
- Subfamily: Acronictinae
- Genus: Nacna; D. S. Fletcher, 1961

Synonyms
- Canna Walker, 1865

= Nacna =

Genus of moths

Nacna is a genus of moths of the family Noctuidae. It was described by David Stephen Fletcher in 1961

== Species ==
- Nacna buschmannferenci Ronkay, Ronkay & Varga, 2019
- Nacna javensis (Warren, 1912)
- Nacna malachitis (Oberthur, 1880)
- Nacna prasinaria (Walker, 1865)
- Nacna pulchripicta (Walker, 1865)
- Nacna smaragdina (Draudt, 1937)
- Nacna splendens (Moore, 1888)
- Nacna sugitanii (Nagano, 1918)
