= Barsine (moth) =

Scientific classification
- Kingdom: Animalia
- Phylum: Arthropoda
- Class: Insecta
- Order: Lepidoptera
- Superfamily: Noctuoidea
- Family: Erebidae
- Subfamily: Arctiinae
- Subtribe: Nudariina
- Genus: Barsine; Walker, 1854

Synonyms
- Castabala Walker, 1864; Mahavira Moore, 1878

Genus of moths

Barsine is a genus of moths in the family Erebidae.

== Species ==
Barsine contains the following species:

- Barsine andromeda Volynkin, Černý & Huang, 2019
- Barsine atypicobarsine N. Singh, Kirti & Joshi, 2016
- Barsine biformis Volynkin & Černý, 2019
- Barsine cacharensis N.Singh, Kirti & Kaleka, 2016
- Barsine callorufa Wu, Fu & Chang, 2013
- Barsine conicornutata (Holloway, 1982)
- Barsine cornutodefecta N. Singh, Kirti & Kaleka, 2016
- Barsine curtisi (Butler, 1881)
- Barsine dao Volynkin, Černý & Huang, 2019
- Barsine defecta Walker, 1854
- Barsine delicia Swinhoe, 1891
- Barsine deliciosa Volynkin & Černý, 2016
- Barsine devikulensis N. Singh & Kirti, 2016
- Barsine epixantha (Meyrick, 1894)
- Barsine euprepia (Hampson, 1900)
- Barsine eurydice Volynkin & Černý, 2019
- Barsine excelsa (Daniel, 1952)
- Barsine flammealis Moore, 1878
- Barsine flavicollis (Moore, 1878)
- Barsine fossi Volynkin & Černý, 2017
- Barsine fuscozonata (Inoue, 1980)
- Barsine germana (Rothschild, 1913)
- Barsine gilveola (Daniel, 1952)
- Barsine gratiosa (Guérin-Méneville, 1843)
- Barsine gratissima (de Joannis, 1930)
- Barsine guangxiensis (Fang, 1991)
- Barsine hausmanni Volynkin & Černý, 2019
- Barsine hemimelaena (de Joannis, 1928)
- Barsine hoenei (Reich, 1937)
- Barsine hololeuca (Hampson, 1895)
- Barsine kampoli Černý, 2009
- Barsine laszloi Volynkin & Černý, 2019
- Barsine linga Moore, 1859
- Barsine lucibilis Swinhoe, 1892
- Barsine mactans Butler, 1877
- Barsine marcelae Černý, 2016
- Barsine nigrovena (Fang, 2000)
- Barsine obsoleta (Reich, 1937)
- Barsine orientalis (Daniel, 1951)
- Barsine pardalis (Mell, 1922)
- Barsine perlucidula Bucsek, 2012
- Barsine perpallida (Hampson, 1900)
- Barsine ponlai Wu, Fu & Chang, 2013
- Barsine pretiosa Moore, 1879
- Barsine pseudomactans Volynkin & Černý, 2016
- Barsine pseudoorientalis N. Singh & Kirti, 2016
- Barsine pulchra (Butler, 1877)
- Barsine roseata (Walker, 1864)
- Barsine rosistriata (Holloway, 1976)
- Barsine rubrata (Reich, 1937)
- Barsine rubricostata (Herrich-Schäffer, 1855)
- Barsine ruficollis (Fang, 1991)
- Barsine rufumdefecta N. Singh & Kirti, 2016
- Barsine sauteri (Strand, 1917)
- Barsine sieglindae Černý, 2016
- Barsine kulingensis (Daniel, 1952)
- Barsine striata (Bremer & Grey, 1852)
- Barsine thomasi Kaleka, 2003
- Barsine ustrina Černý, 2009
- Barsine valvalis Kaleka, 2003
- Barsine vinhphucensis Spitsyn, Kondakov, Tomilova, Pham & Bolotov, 2018
- Barsine wangi Volynkin, Huang, Dubatolov & Kishida, 2019
- Barsine yuennanensis (Daniel, 1952)
