= Chris Cohen (musician) =

American musician (born 1975)

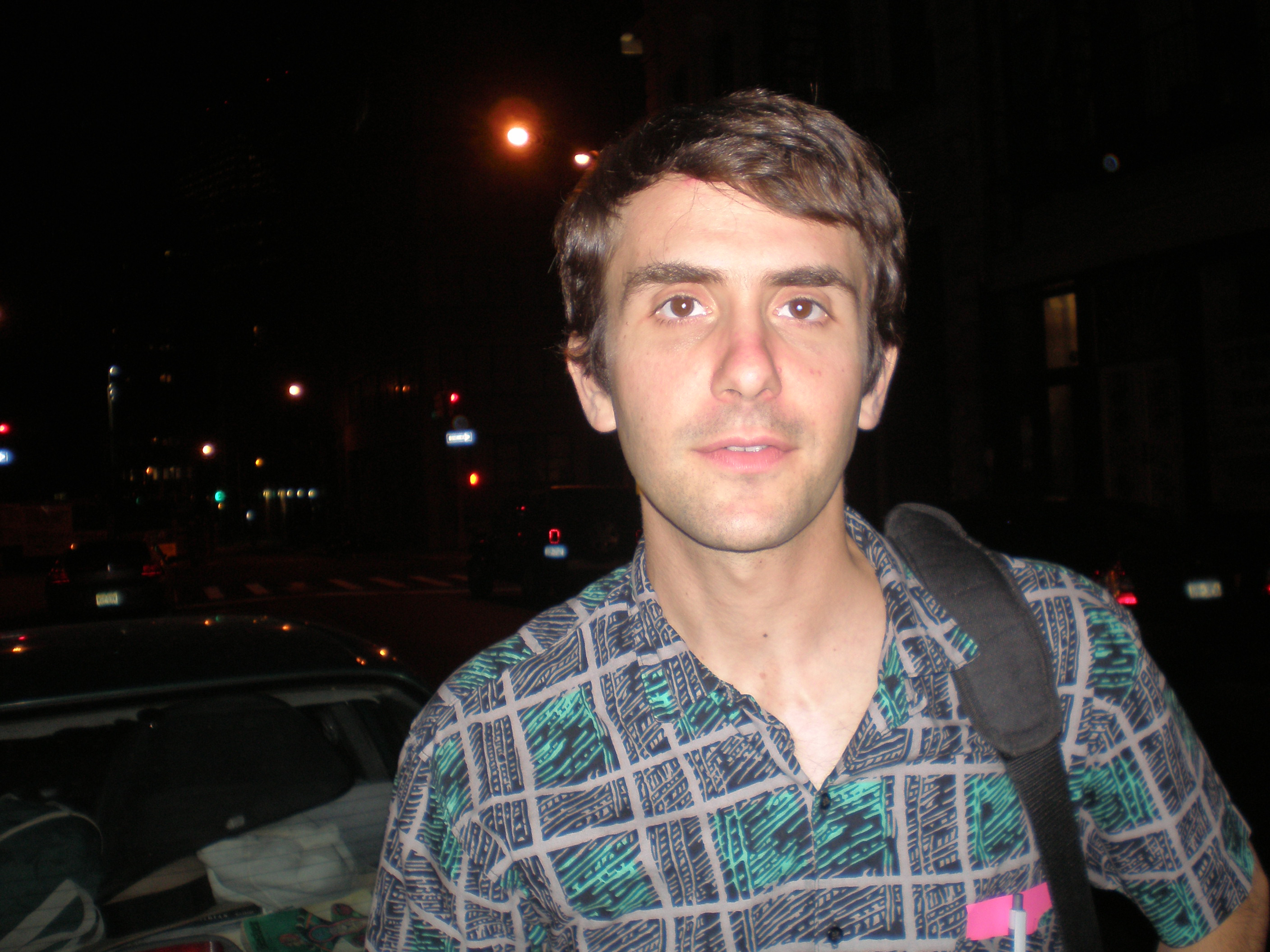
- Cohen in 2008

Background information
- Born: 1975 (age 50–51); Los Angeles, California, U.S.
- Genres: Indie rock; psychedelic pop
- Occupations: Singer-songwriter; producer; multi-instrumentalist
- Instruments: Vocals; guitar; drums; bass; keyboards
- Years active: 1990s–present
- Label: Captured Tracks
- Formerly of: The Curtains; Deerhoof; Natural Dreamers; Cryptacize

Chris Cohen is an American singer-songwriter, producer, and multi-instrumentalist best known for his solo albums as well as for having been a member of the band Deerhoof between 2002 and 2006.

== Early life and education ==
Born in Los Angeles, California in 1975, he is the son of former music business executive Kip Cohen and former Broadway actress Lynn Cohen (known professionally as Lynn Carlisle). In 1991, Cohen appeared in the Sonic Youth video "Cinderella's Big Score" by Dave Markey. His sister is public radio reporter and host Alex Cohen.

His first instrument was drums, which he began playing at the age of 3, later learning to make music by overdubbing himself on a cassette four-track.

== Career ==
Cohen has released three records under his own name on the Captured Tracks label – Overgrown Path (2012), As If Apart (2016), and Chris Cohen (2019). Cohen performed and recorded his first two albums himself, describing them in an interview as "companion pieces."

Overgrown Path was called "a perfectly conceived album" by Allmusic and As If Apart a "powerful, exquisitely realized journey" by Pitchfork. Captured Tracks' owner Mike Sniper stated via Twitter that "whenever I get depressed about running an indie rock label in 2016, I can take solace in knowing I put out 2 Chris Cohen LP's." In 2012 Cohen was listed by Mac DeMarco in Pitchfork as one of his "favorite new artists."

Before beginning to use his own name, Cohen wrote music for his band, The Curtains, as well as for Deerhoof, Natural Dreamers, and Cryptacize, which was a collaboration with Nedelle Torrisi and Michael Carreira. After the dissolution of Cryptacize, Cohen played drums or guitar with Ariel Pink's Haunted Graffiti and White Magic. He also toured and recorded with Cass McCombs and has performed and recorded with Maher Shalal Hash Baz, Danielson and EZTV.

In 2016, he co-produced and played drums on the album Front Row Seat to Earth by Weyes Blood.

Cohen currently performs in his own band and in the duo Park Detail's Band with Yasi Perera.

He has toured the US and Europe extensively with his band since 2012, performing at Primavera Sound, Le Guess Who?, and End of the Road Festivals, performing alongside such artists as Eleanor Friedberger, Tortoise, DIIV, Andy Shauf, Mac DeMarco, and Parquet Courts.

== Discography ==
=== Solo albums ===
- Overgrown Path (2012, Captured Tracks)
- As If Apart (2016, Captured Tracks)
- Chris Cohen (2019, Captured Tracks)
- Paint a Room (2024, Hardly Art)

=== The Curtains ===
- Fast Talks (2002, Thin Wrist)
- Flybys (2003, Thin Wrist)
- Make Us Two Crayons on the Floor split CD w/ Maher Shalal Hash Baz (2003, Yik Yak)
- Vehicles of Travel (2004, Frenetic)
- Calamity (2006, Asthmatic Kitty)

=== Deerhoof ===
- Apple O' (2003, Kill Rock Stars)
- Milk Man (2004, Kill Rock Stars)
- Green Cosmos (2005, Toad/Menlo Park/ATP Recordings)
- The Runners Four (2005, Kill Rock Stars)

=== Natural Dreamers ===
- Natural Dreamers (2004, Frenetic)
- "Sir G" b/w "Just No Probs" single (2013, Joyful Noise Recordings)

=== Cryptacize ===
- Dig That Treasure (2007, Asthmatic Kitty)
- Mythomania (2009, Asthmatic Kitty)

=== Other contributions ===
- Guitar on Cass McCombs' A (2003, Monitor Records)
- Guitar on Danielson's Ships (2006, Secretly Canadian)
- Backing Vocal on Ariel Pink's "Round and Round" on Before Today (2010, 4AD)
- Guitar on Cass McCombs' Wit's End (2011) Domino and Humor Risk (2011, Domino)
- Guitar on Cass McCombs' A Folk Set Apart (2015, Domino)
- Drums and production on Weyes Blood's Front Row Seat to Earth (2016, Mexican Summer)

== See also ==
- List of drummers
- List of guitarists
- List of people from Los Angeles
- Music of Los Angeles
