= Isaac Wardell =

- Born: Isaac Wardell; 30 May 1979 (age 47); San Francisco, USA
- Genres: Classical, Religious Music
- Occupations: Composer, Producer
- Years active: 2008–present
- Label: Sounds Familyre Records (USA) Integrity Music (USA) Tooth & Nail Records (USA)
- Website: ThePorter'sGate

Isaac Wardell is a record producer and composer who primarily writes sacred music. He is the director of The Porter's Gate Worship Project and the Director of Worship Arts at Restoration Anglican Church in Arlington, Virginia.. In 2025, he and Josh Garrels composed music for the Academy Award Nominated Forevergreen (film).

== Biography ==
Wardell is a graduate of KU Leuven in Belgium and Covenant College.

== Discography ==
=== Production credits ===
- Producer - Caroline Cobb, A Seed, A Sunrise: Advent to Christmas Songs (2020)
- Producer - The Porter's Gate, Lament Songs (2020)
- Producer - The Porter's Gate, Justice Songs (2020)
- Producer - Liturgical Folk, Vol. 6: Psalm Settings (2020)
- Producer - The Porter's Gate, Neighbor Songs (2019)
- Producer - Liturgical Folk, Vol. 5: Advent (2019)
- Producer - Josh Garrels, Chrysaline (2019)
- Producer - John Lyzenga, In Troubled Times (2019)
- Producer - Matt & Micah, Let Love Be The Anchor (2019)
- Producer - Liturgical Folk, Vol. 4: Lent Hymns (2019)
- Producer - Matt Papa, Songs from the Wilderness (2019)
- Producer - Liturgical Folk, Vol. 3: Crumbs (2018)
- Producer - Wendell Kimbrough, Come To Me (2018)
- Producer - Paul Zach, God Is The Friend Of Silence (2018)
- Producer - The Porter's Gate, Work Songs (2017)
- Producer - Liturgical Folk, Vol. 2: Edenland (2017)
- Producer - Liturgical Folk, Vol. 1: Table Settings (2017)
- Co-Producer - Josh Garrels, The Light Came Down (2016)
- Producer - Wendell Kimbrough, Psalms We Sing Together (2016)
- Producer - Bifrost Arts, Lamentations (2016)
- Additional production, string arrangements - Sandra McCracken, Psalms (2015)
- Producer - Joseph Holm, God of the Sea and Sea Monster (2015)
- Producer - Bifrost Arts, He Will Not Cry Out (2013)
- Producer - Bifrost Arts, Salvation Is Created (2009)

== See also ==
- Bifrost Arts
- The Welcome Wagon
- Sufjan Stevens
- Sandra McCracken
- Josh Garrels
- Audrey Assad
