= Best of Gloucester County =

Studio album by Danielson
- Released: February 22, 2011
- Genres: Alternative rock, indie rock, gospel, Christian rock
- Length: 42:10
- Labels: Sounds Familyre (US), Fire (UK)
- Producer: Daniel Smith

Danielson chronology
| Ships (2006) | Best of Gloucester County (2011) |

Professional ratings
Review scores
| Source | Rating |
|---|---|
| AllMusic | 3/5 stars |
| The A.V. Club | C+ |
| Pitchfork | 7.9/10 |
| PopMatters | 9/10 stars |
| Spin | 7/10 |

Best of Gloucester County is the eighth full-length album by New Jersey indie rock band Danielson.

== Track listing ==
1. "Complimentary Dismemberment Insurance"
2. "This Day Is a Loaf"
3. "Grow Up"
4. "Lil Norge"
5. "But I Don't Wanna Sing About Guitars"
6. "People's Partay"
7. "Olympic Portions"
8. "You Sleep Good Now"
9. "Hovering Above That Hill"
10. "Denominator Bluise"
11. "Hosanna in the Forest"

== Personnel ==
- Patrick Berkery – drums, percussion
- Rachel Galloway – vocals
- Evan Mazunik – piano, organ
- Megan Slaboda – vocals
- Daniel Smith – vocals, acoustic guitar
- Elin K. Smith – vocals
- Joshua Stamper – bass, horn arrangements
- Sufjan Stevens – banjo, vocals
- Andy Wilson – electric guitar
- Michael Cemprola – alto and tenor Saxophones
- Jon Rees – baritone saxophone, piccolo
- Paul Arbogast – tenor trombone, bass trombone
- Jens Lekman – Swedish vocals on "Lil Norge"
- Emil Nikolaisen – electric guitar #2 on "Olympic Portions", "Hovering Above That Hill"
- Glen Galaxy, Mark Shippy, and Chris Cohen – electric guitar solos on "But I Don't Wanna Sing About Guitars"
