= Calamity (album) =

Studio album by the Curtains
- Released: October 24, 2006
- Length: 31:36
- Label: Asthmatic Kitty
- Producer: The Curtains

The Curtains chronology
Vehicles of Travel (2004)	Calamity (2006)

Professional ratings
Aggregate scores
Source	Rating
Metacritic	60/100
Review scores
Source	Rating
Dusted	7/10 stars
Pitchfork	7.4/10
Tiny Mix Tapes	3/5 marks
AllMusic	3/5 stars

Calamity is the fourth album by Californian pop band the Curtains, released in 2006 on Asthmatic Kitty. It was recorded directly after Deerhoof's "The Runners Four". The album is exclusively produced by Chris Cohen. It features guest performances by Nedelle Torrisi and Yasi Perera (vocal harmonies), as well as trombone by John Ringhofer.

The album's music is mostly composed of compressed guitars, piano and drums; the instrumentation has been described as "nondescript" and "delicate". It is classified as indie rock, although songs contain other elements such as psychedelic rock, jazz, and experimental.

== Track listing ==
1. "Go Lucky" – 3:11
2. "Green Water" – 2:19
3. "Wysteria" – 2:11
4. "The Thousandth Face" – 2:56
5. "World's Most Dangerous Woman" – 2:41
6. "Tornado Traveler's Fear" – 2:44
7. "Roscomare" – 3:02
8. "Old Scott Rd." – 2:08
9. "Calamity" – 2:27
10. "Invisible String" – 1:19
11. "Brunswick Stew" – 1:43
12. "Fell On a Rock and Broke It" – 2:07
13. "Spinning Top" – 2:50

== Personnel ==
- Chris Cohen – vocals, guitar, bass, keyboards, drums
- Nedelle Torrisi – vocals
- John Ringhofer – trombone

== Reception ==
Calamity received mixed reviews from critics, with a metascore of 60 on Metacritic. Pitchfork rated the album 7.4 out of 10, stating that Cohen was "struggling to balance his twee pop tendencies with experimentation", while AllMusic gave the album a 3 out of 5 stars, stating that "the hits outnumbered the misses".
