= St. Peter's Episcopal Church (Clarksboro, New Jersey) =

Historic church in New Jersey, United States

- U.S. National Register of Historic Places
- New Jersey Register of Historic Places
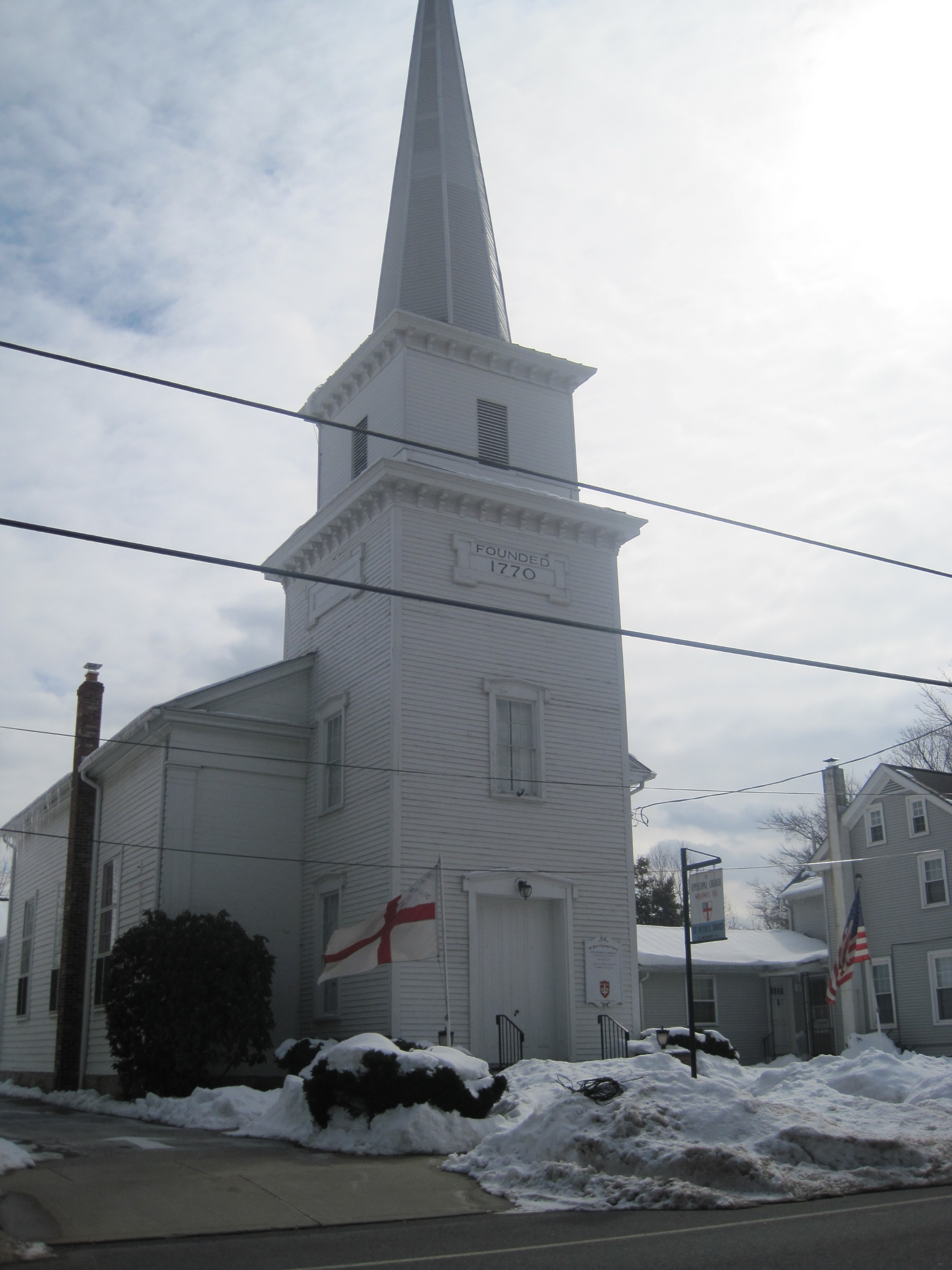

- Location within Gloucester County, New Jersey Location within New Jersey Location within the United States
- Location: King's Hwy., Clarksboro, New Jersey
- Coordinates: 39°47′58″N 75°13′28″W
- Area: 1 acre (0.40 ha)
- Built: 1846
- Architectural style: Greek Revival
- NRHP reference No.: 77000869
- NJRHP No.
- Added to NRHP: August 10, 1977

St. Peter's Protestant Episcopal Church, Berkeley in Clarksboro is a historic church on King's Highway in the Clarksboro section of East Greenwich Township, Gloucester County, New Jersey, United States.

St. Peter's was founded in Berkeley (now Mount Royal, NJ) in 1770 by the Society for the Propagation of the Gospel, the missionary arm of the Church of England. The current church was built in 1845 and added to the National Register of Historic Places in 1977.

== See also ==
- National Register of Historic Places listings in Gloucester County, New Jersey
