= East Greenwich Township, New Jersey =

Township in Gloucester County, New Jersey, US

- Township
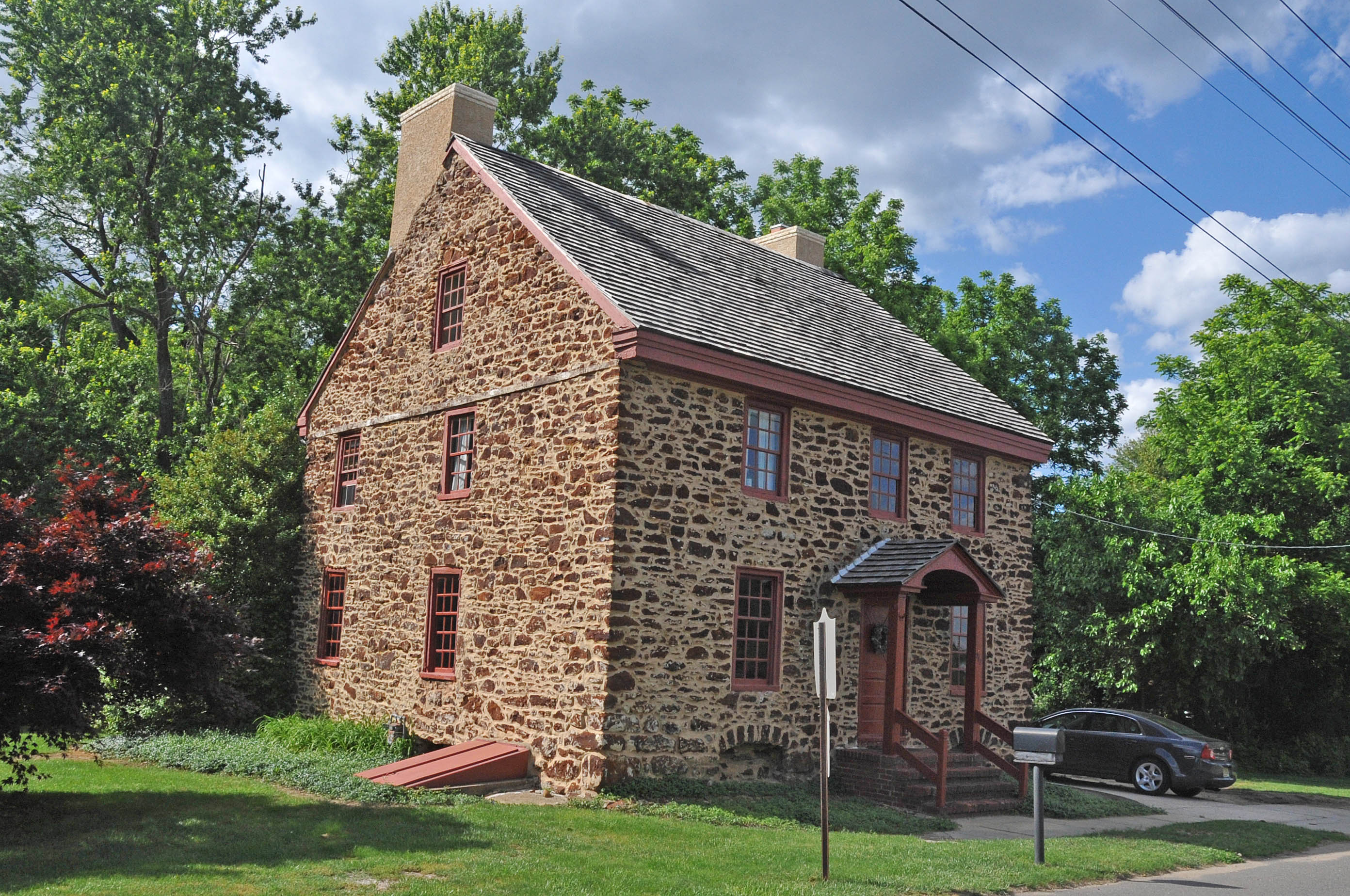
- Death of the Fox Inn

- Seal

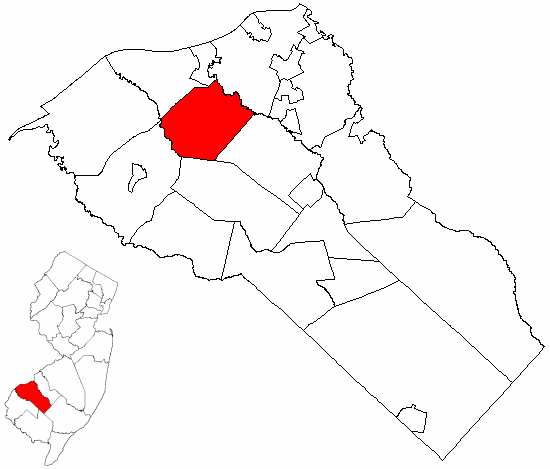
- Location of East Greenwich Township in Gloucester County highlighted in red (right). Inset map: Location of Gloucester County in New Jersey highlighted in red (left).

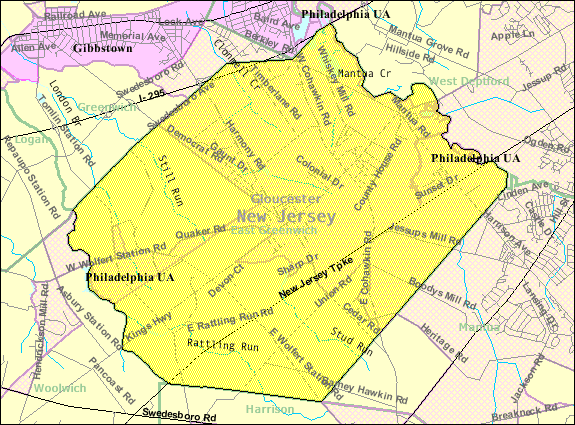
- Census Bureau map of East Greenwich Township, New Jersey

- Location in Gloucester County Location in New Jersey Location in the United States
- Coordinates: 39.790519°N 75.240592°W
- Country: United States
- State: New Jersey
- County: Gloucester
- Incorporated: February 10, 1881

Government
  - Type: Township
  - Body: Township Committee
  - Mayor: James R. Philbin Jr. (R, term ends December 31, 2026)
  - Municipal clerk: Elizabeth McGill

Area
  - Total: 14.91 sq mi (38.62 km^{2})
  - Land: 14.44 sq mi (37.41 km^{2})
  - Water: 0.47 sq mi (1.21 km^{2}) 3.13%
  - Rank: 176th of 565 in state 12th of 24 in county
- Elevation: 62 ft (19 m)

Population (2020)
  - Total: 11,706
  - Estimate (2023): 12,394
  - Rank: 217th of 565 in state 10th of 24 in county
  - Density: 810.5/sq mi (312.9/km^{2})
  - Rank: 406th of 565 in state 16th of 24 in county
- Time zone: UTC−05:00 (Eastern (EST))
  - Summer (DST): UTC−04:00 (Eastern (EDT))
- ZIP Code: 08056 – Mickleton
- Area code: 856 Exchanges: 224, 423, 467, 478
- FIPS code: 3401519180
- GNIS feature ID: 0882141
- Website: www.eastgreenwichnj.com

East Greenwich Township is a township in Gloucester County, in the U.S. state of New Jersey. As of the 2020 United States census, the township's population was 11,706, an increase of 2,151 (+22.5%) from the 2010 census count of 9,555, which in turn reflected an increase of 4,125 (+76.0%) from the 5,430 counted in the 2000 census.

East Greenwich Township was created by the New Jersey Legislature on February 10, 1881, from the eastern part of Greenwich Township and western part of Mantua Township.

== Geography ==
According to the U.S. Census Bureau, the township had a total area of 14.922 square miles (38.649 km^{2}), including 14.440 square miles (37.400 km^{2}) of land and 0.482 square miles (1.249 km^{2}) of water (3.23%). East Greenwich borders the municipalities of Greenwich Township, Harrison Township, Logan Township, Mantua Township, Paulsboro, and Woolwich Township in Gloucester County. Unincorporated communities, localities, and places located partially or completely within the township include Clarksboro, Hendricksons Mills, Mickleton, Middleton, Mount Royal, Tomlins, Warringtons Mills, and Wolfert.

== Demographics ==
Historical population
Census	Pop.	Note	%±
1890	1,259		—
1900	1,323		5.1%
1910	1,406		6.3%
1920	1,483		5.5%
1930	2,031		37.0%
1940	2,121		4.4%
1950	2,336		10.1%
1960	2,722		16.5%
1970	3,280		20.5%
1980	4,144		26.3%
1990	5,258		26.9%
2000	5,430		3.3%
2010	9,555		76.0%
2020	11,706		22.5%
2023 (est.)	12,394		5.9%
Population sources: 1890–2000; 1890–1920 1890 1890–1910; 1910–1930 1940–2000; 2000 2010 2020

=== 2010 census ===
The 2010 United States census counted 9,555 people, 3,262 households, and 2,645 families in the township. The population density was 661.7 inhabitants per square mile (255.5/km^{2}). There were 3,405 housing units at an average density of 235.8 per square mile (91.0/km^{2}). The racial makeup was 88.45% (8,451) White, 5.86% (560) Black or African American, 0.14% (13) Native American, 3.61% (345) Asian, 0.05% (5) Pacific Islander, 0.59% (56) from other races, and 1.31% (125) from two or more races. Hispanic or Latino of any race were 3.02% (289) of the population.

Of the 3,262 households, 41.5% had children under the age of 18; 70.4% were married couples living together; 7.3% had a female householder with no husband present and 18.9% were non-families. Of all households, 14.9% were made up of individuals and 6.3% had someone living alone who was 65 years of age or older. The average household size was 2.89 and the average family size was 3.22.

27.3% of the population were under the age of 18, 6.2% from 18 to 24, 29.1% from 25 to 44, 26.9% from 45 to 64, and 10.5% who were 65 years of age or older. The median age was 37.6 years. For every 100 females, the population had 96.9 males. For every 100 females ages 18 and older there were 94.3 males.

The Census Bureau's 2006–2010 American Community Survey showed that, in 2010 inflation-adjusted dollars, median household income was $98,295 with a margin of error of +/− $13,759, and median family income was $109,375 (+/− $12,449). Males had a median income of $90,476 (+/− $9,127) versus $50,431 (+/− $6,983) for females. The per capita income for the borough was $38,234 (+/− $3,245). About 3.4% of families and 4.0% of the population were below the poverty line, including 5.2% of those under age 18 and 3.0% of those age 65 or over.

=== 2000 census ===
As of the 2000 U.S. census, there were 5,430 people, 1,901 households, and 1,515 families residing in the township. The population density was 368.1 inhabitants per square mile (142.1/km^{2}). There were 1,971 housing units at an average density of 133.6 per square mile (51.6/km^{2}). The racial makeup of the township was 94.68% White, 3.26% African American, 0.13% Native American, 0.64% Asian, 0.24% from other races, and 1.05% from two or more races. Hispanic or Latino of any race were 1.40% of the population.

There were 1,901 households, out of which 35.9% had children under the age of 18 living with them, 68.9% were married couples living together, 7.5% had a female householder with no husband present, and 20.3% were non-families. 17.4% of all households were made up of individuals, and 8.8% had someone living alone who was 65 years of age or older. The average household size was 2.77 and the average family size was 3.12.

In the township, the population was spread out, with 25.0% under the age of 18, 6.5% from 18 to 24, 27.0% from 25 to 44, 26.5% from 45 to 64, and 14.9% who were 65 years of age or older. The median age was 41 years. For every 100 females, there were 91.3 males. For every 100 females age 18 and over, there were 88.3 males.

The median income for a household in the township was $65,701, and the median income for a family was $74,455. Males had a median income of $51,662 versus $31,619 for females. The per capita income for the township was $25,345. About 2.6% of families and 3.9% of the population were below the poverty line, including 4.2% of those under age 18 and 4.0% of those age 65 or over.

== Arts and culture ==
The indie rock band Danielson comes from East Greenwich.

== Government ==
=== Local government ===
East Greenwich Township is governed under the Township form of New Jersey municipal government, one of 141 (of the 564) municipalities statewide that use this form, the second-most commonly used form of government in the state. The Township Committee is comprised of five members, who are elected directly by the voters at-large in partisan elections to serve three-year terms of office on a staggered basis, with either one or two seats coming up for election each year as part of the November general election in a three-year cycle. At an annual reorganization meeting, the Township Committee selects one of its members to serve as Mayor and another as Deputy Mayor.

As of 2025, East Greenwich Township Committee members are Mayor James R. Philbin Jr. (R, term on committee and as mayor ends December 31, 2025), Deputy Mayor Richard P. Schober (R, term on committee ends 2026; term as deputy mayor ends 2025), Eileen Hollingshead (R, 2025), Michael Quigley (R, 2027) and Robert Tice (R, 2026).

=== Federal, state, and county representation ===
East Greenwich Township is split between the 1st and 2nd Congressional Districts and is part of New Jersey's 3rd state legislative district. Prior to the 2010 Census, all of East Greenwich Township had been part of the 1st Congressional District, a change made by the New Jersey Redistricting Commission that took effect in January 2013, based on the results of the November 2012 general elections. The split placed 7,747 residents living in the township's north and east in the 1st District, while 1,808 residents in the southwestern portion of the township were placed in the 2nd District.

For the 119th United States Congress, New Jersey's 1st congressional district is represented by Donald Norcross (D, Camden). For the 119th United States Congress, New Jersey's 2nd congressional district is represented by Jeff Van Drew (R, Dennis Township). New Jersey is represented in the United States Senate by Democrats Cory Booker (Newark, term ends 2027) and Andy Kim (Moorestown, term ends 2031).

For the 2026–2027 session, the 3rd legislative district of the New Jersey Legislature is represented in the State Senate by John Burzichelli (D, Paulsboro) and in the General Assembly by David Bailey (D, Woodstown) and Heather Simmons (D, Glassboro).

Gloucester County is governed by a board of county commissioners, whose seven members are elected at-large to three-year terms of office on a staggered basis in partisan elections, with either two or three seats coming up for election each year. At a reorganization meeting held each January, the Board selects a Director and a Deputy Director from among its members. As of 2025, Gloucester County's Commissioners are:

Director Frank J. DiMarco (D, Deptford Township, 2025), Matt Weng (D, Pitman, 2026), Joann Gattinelli (D, Washington Township, 2026), Nicholas DeSilvio (R, Franklin Township, 2027), Denice DiCarlo (D, West Deptford Township, 2025) Deputy Director Jim Jefferson (D, Woodbury, 2026) and Christopher Konawel Jr. (R, Glassboro, 2027).

Gloucester County's constitutional officers are: Clerk James N. Hogan (D, Franklin Township; 2027), Sheriff Carmel Morina (D, Greenwich Township; 2027) and Surrogate Giuseppe "Joe" Chila (D, Woolwich Township; 2028).

=== Politics ===
United States presidential election results for East Greenwich Township 2024 2020 2016 2012 2008 2004
Year	Republican		Democratic		Third party(ies)	
Year	No.	%	No.	%	No.	%
2024	3,739	53.68%	3,131	44.95%	95	1.36%
2020	3,641	51.68%	3,308	46.96%	96	1.36%
2016	2,844	52.19%	2,391	43.88%	214	3.93%
2012	2,752	53.44%	2,346	45.55%	52	1.01%
2008	2,319	51.11%	2,186	48.18%	32	0.71%
2004	2,062	55.37%	1,633	43.85%	29	0.78%

As of March 2011, there were a total of 6,416 registered voters in East Greenwich, of which 2,088 (32.5%) were registered as Democrats, 1,285 (20.0%) were registered as Republicans and 3,042 (47.4%) were registered as Unaffiliated. There was one voter registered to another party.

In the 2012 presidential election, Republican Mitt Romney received 53.4% of the vote (2,752 cast), ahead of Democrat Barack Obama with 45.6% (2,346 votes), and other candidates with 1.0% (52 votes), among the 5,185 ballots cast by the township's 7,019 registered voters (35 ballots were spoiled), for a turnout of 73.9%. In the 2008 presidential election, Republican John McCain received 50.6% of the vote (2,319 cast), ahead of Democrat Barack Obama with 47.7% (2,186 votes) and other candidates with 0.7% (32 votes), among the 4,580 ballots cast by the borough's 5,869 registered voters, for a turnout of 78.0%. In the 2004 presidential election, Republican George W. Bush received 55.0% of the vote (2,062 ballots cast), outpolling Democrat John Kerry with 43.6% (1,633 votes) and other candidates with 0.6% (29 votes), among the 3,749 ballots cast by the borough's 4,723 registered voters, for a turnout percentage of 79.4.

Gubernatorial election results for East Greenwich Township
Year	Republican		Democratic		Third party(ies)	
Year	No.	%	No.	%	No.	%
2025	2,822	51.39%	2,646	48.19%	23	0.42%
2021	2,541	58.72%	1,759	40.65%	27	0.62%
2017	1,503	48.13%	1,560	49.95%	60	1.92%
2013	2,348	71.54%	884	26.93%	50	1.52%
2009	1,636	53.34%	1,148	37.43%	283	9.23%
2005	1,238	52.44%	1,058	44.81%	65	2.75%

In the 2013 gubernatorial election, Republican Chris Christie received 71.5% of the vote (2,348 cast), ahead of Democrat Barbara Buono with 26.9% (884 votes), and other candidates with 1.5% (50 votes), among the 3,359 ballots cast by the township's 7,070 registered voters (77 ballots were spoiled), for a turnout of 47.5%. In the 2009 gubernatorial election, Republican Chris Christie received 52.7% of the vote (1,636 ballots cast), ahead of Democrat Jon Corzine with 37.0% (1,148 votes), Independent Chris Daggett with 8.7% (269 votes) and other candidates with 0.5% (14 votes), among the 3,103 ballots cast by the borough's 6,096 registered voters, yielding a 50.9% turnout.

United States Senate election results for East Greenwich Township1
Year	Republican		Democratic		Third party(ies)	
Year	No.	%	No.	%	No.	%
2024	3,547	52.35%	3,166	46.73%	62	0.92%
2018	2,502	55.76%	1,841	41.03%	144	3.21%
2012	2,460	49.78%	2,384	48.24%	98	1.98%
2006	1,347	52.49%	1,180	45.99%	39	1.52%

United States Senate election results for East Greenwich Township2
Year	Republican		Democratic		Third party(ies)	
Year	No.	%	No.	%	No.	%
2020	3,658	52.63%	3,183	45.79%	110	1.58%
2014	1,488	54.77%	1,189	43.76%	40	1.47%
2013	938	57.44%	677	41.46%	18	1.10%
2008	2,168	50.64%	2,030	47.42%	83	1.94%

== Education ==
Public school students in pre-kindergarten through sixth grade attend the East Greenwich Township School District. As of the 2020–21 school year, the district, comprised of two schools, had an enrollment of 1,308 students and 110.2 classroom teachers (on an FTE basis), for a student–teacher ratio of 11.9:1. The schools in the district (with 2020–21 enrollment data from the National Center for Education Statistics) are Jeffrey Clark School located on Quaker Road with 575 students in Grades Pre-K–2 and Samuel Mickle School located on Kings Highway with 728 students in Grades 3–6. Based on data from the 2014 Taxpayers' Guide to Education Spending prepared by the New Jersey Department of Education, the East Greenwich district's total per pupil spending of $12,585 was the lowest of any regular school district.

Public school students in seventh through twelfth grades are educated by the Kingsway Regional School District, which also serves students from South Harrison Township, Swedesboro, and Woolwich Township, with the addition of students from Logan Township who attend the district's high school as part of a sending/receiving relationship in which tuition is paid on a per-pupil basis by the Logan Township School District. East Greenwich Township accounts for almost a third of district enrollment. As of the 2020–2021 school year, the district's two schools had an enrollment of 2,544 students and 189.9 classroom teachers (on an FTE basis), for a student–teacher ratio of 13.4:1. Schools in the district (with 2020–2021 enrollment data from the National Center for Education Statistics) are Kingsway Regional Middle School with 1,023 students in grades 7–8 and Kingsway Regional High School with 1,802 students in grades 9–12. Under a 2011 proposal, Kingsway would merge with its constituent member's K–6 districts to become a full K–12 district with various options for including Logan Township as part of the consolidated district.

Students from across the county are eligible to apply to attend Gloucester County Institute of Technology, a four-year high school in Deptford Township that provides technical and vocational education. As a public school, students do not pay tuition to attend the school.

Guardian Angels Regional School (Pre-K-Grade 3 campus in Gibbstown CDP and 4–8 campus in Paulsboro) serves students from Clarksboro, Mickleton, Mount Royal, and other sections of East Greenwich township. It is under the Roman Catholic Diocese of Camden.

== Transportation ==
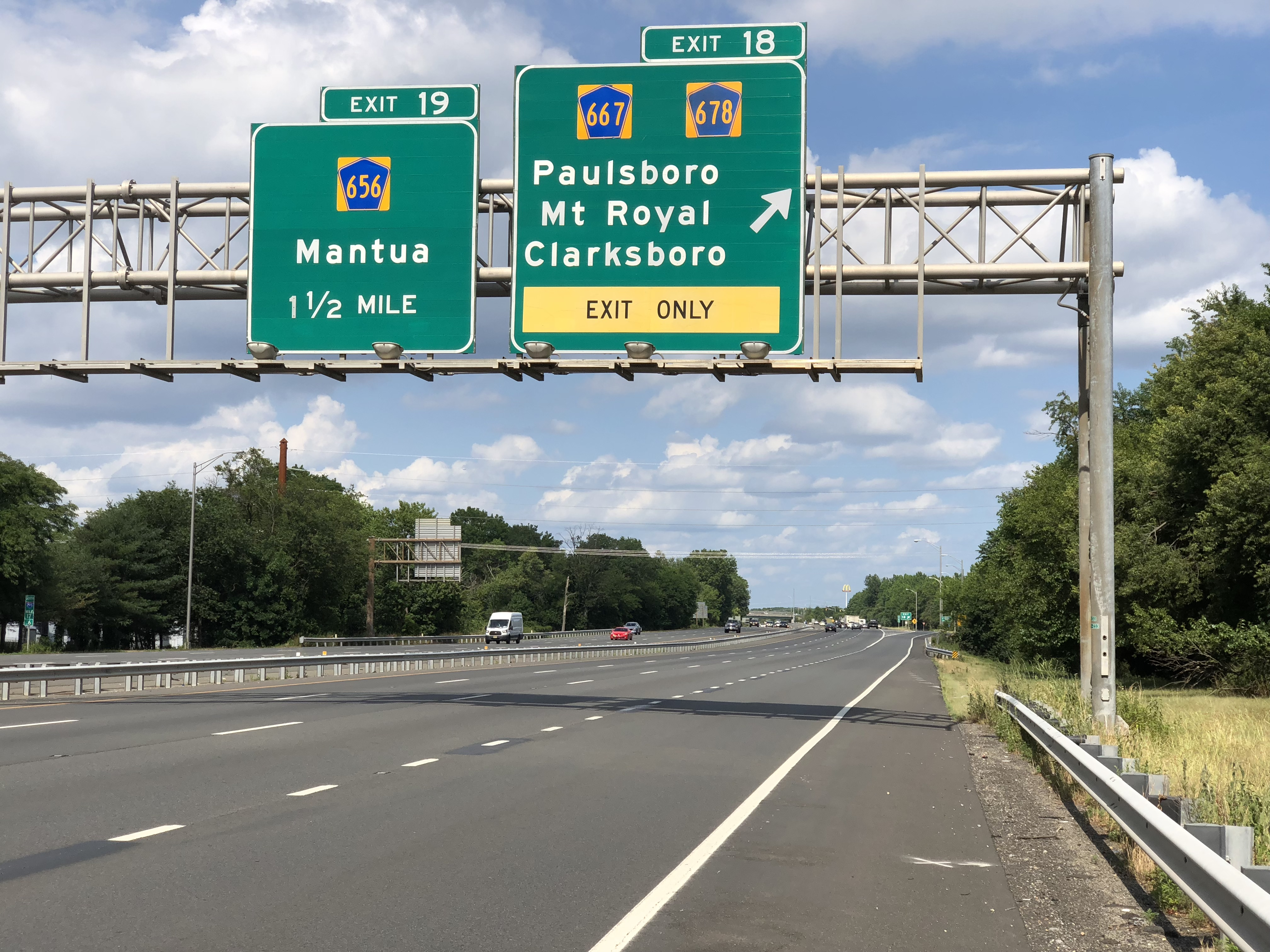
Northbound Interstate 295 and US 130 in East Greenwich Township

=== Roads and highways ===
As of May 2010, the township had a total of 76.53 miles (123.16 km) of roadways, of which 47.44 miles (76.35 km) were maintained by the municipality, 23.68 miles (38.11 km) by Gloucester County, 0.75 miles (1.21 km) by the New Jersey Department of Transportation and 4.66 miles (7.50 km) by the New Jersey Turnpike Authority.

The New Jersey Turnpike passes through in the southeast, but the closest interchange is Interchange 2 in neighboring Woolwich. Interstate 295 and U.S. Route 130 pass through with Exit 17 straddling the border between the municipality and neighboring Greenwich.

The major county highway to pass through is County Road 551.

=== Public transportation ===
NJ Transit bus service is available to Philadelphia on the 401 route.

== Notable people ==
People who were born in, residents of, or otherwise closely associated with East Greenwich Township include:

- Rachel Davis DuBois (1892–1993), educator, human rights activist and pioneer of intercultural education
- George Gill Green (1842–1925), patent medicine manufacturer
- Martin A. Herman (born 1939), politician who served in the New Jersey General Assembly, where he represented the 3rd Legislative District from 1974 to 1986, and was later appointed as a judge in New Jersey Superior Court in Gloucester County
- Amos J. Peaslee (1887–1969), politician, military official, author and diplomat who served as United States Ambassador to Australia
- Hardy Richardson (1855–1931), Major League Baseball player

== See also ==
- Manor of East Greenwich
