= Cryptacize =

American music group

- Origin: Oakland, California, U.S.
- Genres: Art rock, California Pop, Indie pop
- Years active: 2007–2009
- Label: Asthmatic Kitty,
- Past members: Chris Cohen (musician), Nedelle, Michael Carreira, Aaron Olson, Corey Fogel
- Website: Cryptacize

Cryptacize is a California pop band founded by Nedelle Torrisi and Chris Cohen in 2006. They released two records on the Asthmatic Kitty label.

After seeing percussionist Michael Carreira's solo cowbell videos on YouTube, Cohen and Torrisi asked him to join the band and they recorded their debut album Dig That Treasure (which was named after a musical written by Cohen's father in 1958).

Cryptacize generated some controversy in 2008 with their cover of Steely Dan's Peg when some readers posted angry comments on Stereogum.

They toured the US many times, opening for bands such as Why?, Danielson, Sufjan Stevens, Ariel Pink's Haunted Graffiti, and The Fiery Furnaces.

== Discography ==
=== Albums ===
- Dig That Treasure CD/LP (Asthmatic Kitty, 2007)
- Mythomania CD/LP (Asthmatic Kitty, 2009)

=== Singles ===
- split w/ Why? - Peg/As I Went Out One Morning (Asthmatic Kitty, 2008)
- Easy to Dream/Lost Beauties (Slowboy, 2009)
