= Half-handed Cloud =

American recording project

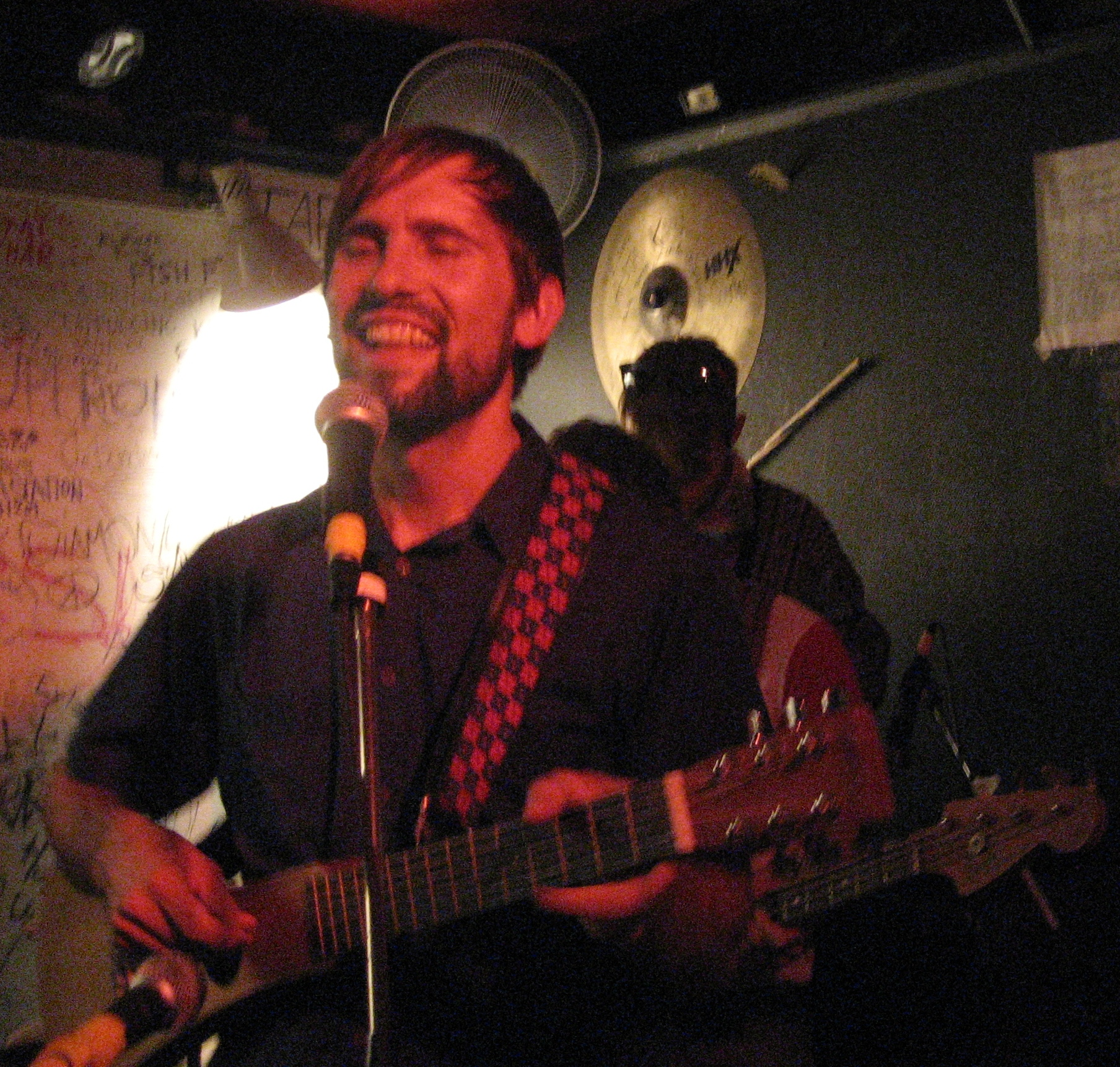
Half-handed Cloud at a concert in Haninge, Sweden in 2008

Half-handed Cloud is an American recording project, based in Helsinki, Finland since 2015. It was started in 1999 as a one-man band by John Ringhofer, who created the band name based on an occurrence in the Old Testament. The majority of Half-handed Cloud's albums have been released on Asthmatic Kitty Records. His previous band was Wookieback with Matthew Vollmer and Brandon Buckner. Ringhofer, a vegetarian, lived rent free in return for his custodial services at a church in Berkeley, CA for a decade. John Ringhofer has collaborated with Sufjan Stevens on Half-handed Cloud's What's The Remedy? 7-inch, among other works such as Thy Is A Word And Feet Need Lamps, and 2014's Flying Scroll Flight Control. Daniel Smith of Danielson and Sounds Familyre is credited for helping to establish Half-handed Cloud's early days, and has been a frequent collaborator with John Ringhofer.

== Discography ==
=== Albums ===
- Learning About Your Scale (1999)
- We Haven't Just Been Told, We Have Been Loved (2002)
- Thy Is a Word and Feet Need Lamps (2005)
- Halos & Lassos (2006)
- As Stowaways in Cabinets of Surf, We Live-out in Our Members a Kind of Rebirth]] (2010)
- Flying Scroll Flight Control (2014)
- I Don't Have A Bib (2018)
- Flutterama (2022)

=== EPs ===
- I'm So Sheepy (2000)
- What's the Remedy? (2005)
- Harp That's Hung-Up in the Tree (2006)
- Winding Currents on a Spool (2007)
- DOVE (2011)
- Blood Brothers (2012)
- Foiled EP N°1 (2015)
- Foiled EP N°2 (2015)
- Jiminy Circuits (2016)

=== Compilation albums ===
- Cut Me Down & Count My Rings (2009)
- Gathered Out of Thin Air (2019)

== In popular culture ==
The band's 2015 song Nativity Costume (2000 Year's Eve) was remixed in the 2019 video game Hypnospace Outlaw.
