= Danielson: A Family Movie =

- Advertising poster
- Directed by: JL Aronson
- Release date: 2006
- Running time: 110 minutes

Danielson: A Family Movie is a 2006 documentary film about the Christian indie pop band Danielson. It was directed, filmed, produced, and edited by JL Aronson.

== Content ==
The film follows the life of Danielson leader, Daniel Smith, from the band's inception in 1993 to 2006. The band started with the creation of Smith's senior thesis project, which became their first album, A Prayer for Every Hour. For live performances, members of the band wear nurse uniforms to represent "the healing power of the Good News." As time passes, members of the band leave and return, as some go to college and get married. The film documents Danielson's lack of belonging in either the mainstream Christian music genre, or the indie music genre. Included are interviews with Smith's parents and fans, sequences of animation, and information about Smith's background. Also included is documentation of Smith's mentoring of songwriter Sufjan Stevens, most famous for his 2005 album, Illinois.

The artwork for the film depicts Smith standing with a large tree costume on, with fruit hanging above. The fruit represents the fruit of the Holy Spirit, "love, joy, peace, long-suffering, kindness, goodness, faithfulness, gentleness and self-control."

== Reception ==
Danielson: A Family Movie premiered at the 2006 SXSW Film Festival and went on to play at over 25 festivals, internationally, collecting several awards. Critically, it received mixed reviews, reflecting the experimental storytelling approach, as well as the subject's own tendency to elicit conflicting responses. New York Times reviewer Neil Genzlinger found himself "entranced" for a while, but ultimately found Smith to be "pretentious." Bill White of the Seattle Post-Intelligencer said Smith has an "irritating squeak of a voice," and that his "comical incompetence wins him the adoration of adolescent misfits." Chicago Reader's Monica Kendrick stated in her review that those who aren't fans of the band will dislike the "relative lack of dramatic tension." However, Joshua Land in the Village Voice called the film "a delight, even for the uninitiated." PopMatters reviewer Jennifer Kelly also responded positively to the film, saying "it brings us so squarely into Smith’s world." Kelly also found the music to be "remarkable," and that the film depicts "ideal Christianity." Kelly noted the fame achieved by Sufjan Stevens, and that the rest of the members of the band seem "genuinely, unconflictedly positive about their friend’s success." And Sean Nelson, writing for Seattle's The Stranger said, "Here’s a rock rebel whose rebellion is the result of faith, imagination, and a stable, encouraging home life. It takes a pretty impressive film not to stumble over such rich contradictions. Danielson observes each one with grace, optimism, and curiosity." Although the film's release was widely covered, review aggregator Metacritic compiled only six critic reviews of the film, yielding a 59/100 ("average").

Among other accolades, the film won the audience award at the 2006 Chicago Underground Film Festival.
