= He Never Said a Mumblin' Word =

Song by Louisiana State Penitentiary inmates
- Recorded: Angola Prison Farm, 1933
- Genre: Spiritual folk song
- Songwriter: Traditional

"He Never Said a Mumblin' Word" (also known as "They Hung Him on a Cross", "Mumblin' Word", "Crucifixion", and "Easter") is an American Negro Spiritual folk song.

The song narrates the crucifixion of Jesus Christ, detailing how he was nailed to the cross, "whooped up the hill", speared in the side, and hung his head and died, all the while keeping a dignified silence. Like all traditional music, the lyrics vary from version to version, but maintain the same story.

== Origins ==
The songs' writers and origins are unknown. One of the earliest sources in which it is found is the 1913 collection Favorite Folk-Melodies as Sung by Tuskegee Students, compiled by music educator and composer Nathaniel Clark Smith while he was based at the Tuskegee Institute. Notes accompanying American Ballads and Folk Songs, an anthology of songs collected by John Lomax and Alan Lomax during the 1930s and 1940s, mention that the song as known throughout Louisiana, Texas, Mississippi, and Tennessee, and was titled "Never Said a Mumbalin' Word." It is known to be a companion piece to, and possibly has the same writer(s) as, "Were You There", another Spiritual.

== Recorded versions ==
- Roland Hayes – recorded the song for Victor Records in 1927. A Song Recital (Columbia Masterworks M-393, 1939) includes an unaccompanied piece in a selected set of mostly classical selections. Hayes published his arrangement of the song as part of the song cycle Life of Christ, and recorded it again in 1953 and other times. Later performers also often credit his arrangement.
- Unidentified prisoners – John and Alan Lomax recorded a performance by a group of unidentified prisoners in June 1933 at the Angola Prison Farm, Louisiana, and in July 1933 at the Parchman Farm penitentiary, Mississippi.
- Golden Gate Quartet – recorded a rendition in 1941 for Okeh Records.
- Classical contralto singer Marian Anderson began regularly performing the song in the 1930s and recorded it twice, once in 1941 at the Lotos Club and again for the album Marian Anderson Sings Eleven Great Spirituals (1952) with pianist Franz Rupp, using an arrangement by John C. Payne. She used this song to conclude a 1935 performance in Salzburg, Austria, for an audience that included conductor Arturo Toscanini, prompting this recount from an American observer, Vincent Sheean, in his 1943 memoir Between the Thunder and the Sun: "At the end of this spiritual there was no applause at all – a silence instinctive, natural, and intense, so that you were afraid to breathe."
- J. Rosamond Johnson – recorded it in 1944.
- Lead Belly – the Lomaxes recorded the song while on a visit to Camp C at Louisiana State Penitentiary in 1933, where they also discovered Lead Belly, who recorded several versions of the song from 1945 onwards. According to Lead Belly, the song originated from "down south" and he claimed to have learned it from his mother, Sallie Brown. Lead Belly recorded at least three versions of the song. The earliest was on February 15, 1945, as part of the Standard Oil Company-sponsored radio show Let it Shine on Me in San Francisco. It was recorded as the final part of medley along with two other spiritual songs, "Every Time I Feel the Spirit" and "Swing Low, Sweet Chariot", featuring children singing along. The song was recorded under the title "They Hung Him on a Cross", whereas his final two recordings of the song, recorded during his last recording sessions ranging from September 27, 1948 to November 5, 1948 in New York with producer Frederic Ramsey, Jr., list the song as "He Never Said a Mumblin' Word." An a cappella version of the song and a solo acoustic version of the song were recorded and are featured on Smithsonian Folkways 1994 box set Lead Belly's Last Sessions.
- Morton Gould – adapted it for string orchestra in his 1959 composition Spirituals for Strings. It was recorded in 1963 by Morton Gould and his Orchestra.
- The Jury – Members of American alternative rock bands Nirvana and the Screaming Trees formed a side project known as the Jury in 1989, featuring Kurt Cobain on vocals and guitar, Mark Lanegan on vocals, Krist Novoselic on bass and Mark Pickerel on drums. Over two days of recording sessions, on August 20 and 28, 1989, the band recorded four songs also performed by Lead Belly; "Where Did You Sleep Last Night?", an instrumental version of "Grey Goose", "Ain't It a Shame" and "They Hung Him on a Cross"; the latter of which featured Cobain solo. Cobain was inspired to record the songs after receiving a copy of Lead Belly's Last Sessions' from friend Slim Moon, after which hearing it he "felt a connection to Leadbelly's almost physical expressions of longing and desire."
- Moses Hogan
- Roger McGuinn – Byrds founder Roger McGuinn recorded two versions of the song. In 1996, he made an mp3 quality recording available for free via his Folk Den website. On the website, McGuinn uses the title "Easter" (from the opening line "On Easter morn he rose"). On the 1999 compact disc McGuinn's Folk Den Vol. 2., McGuinn released this same recording under the longer title "Easter Morn". In 2005, McGuinn released a more professional quality recording of the song, again with the title "Easter Morn", as part of his four-disc set "The Folk Den Project."
- The Welcome Wagon – a version appears on the 2008 album Welcome to The Welcome Wagon.
