= Hollingshead Airport =

Airport in New Jersey, US

- IATA: none; ICAO: none; FAA LID: NJ25

Summary
- Owner: Keith Hollingshead
- Location: Clarksboro, New Jersey
- Elevation AMSL: 99 ft (30 m)
- Coordinates: 39°47′22″N 075°13′41″W

Map
- Interactive map of Hollingshead Airport

Runways
Direction	Length		Surface
Direction	ft	m	Surface
14/32	2,400	732	Turf
- Source: Federal Aviation Administration

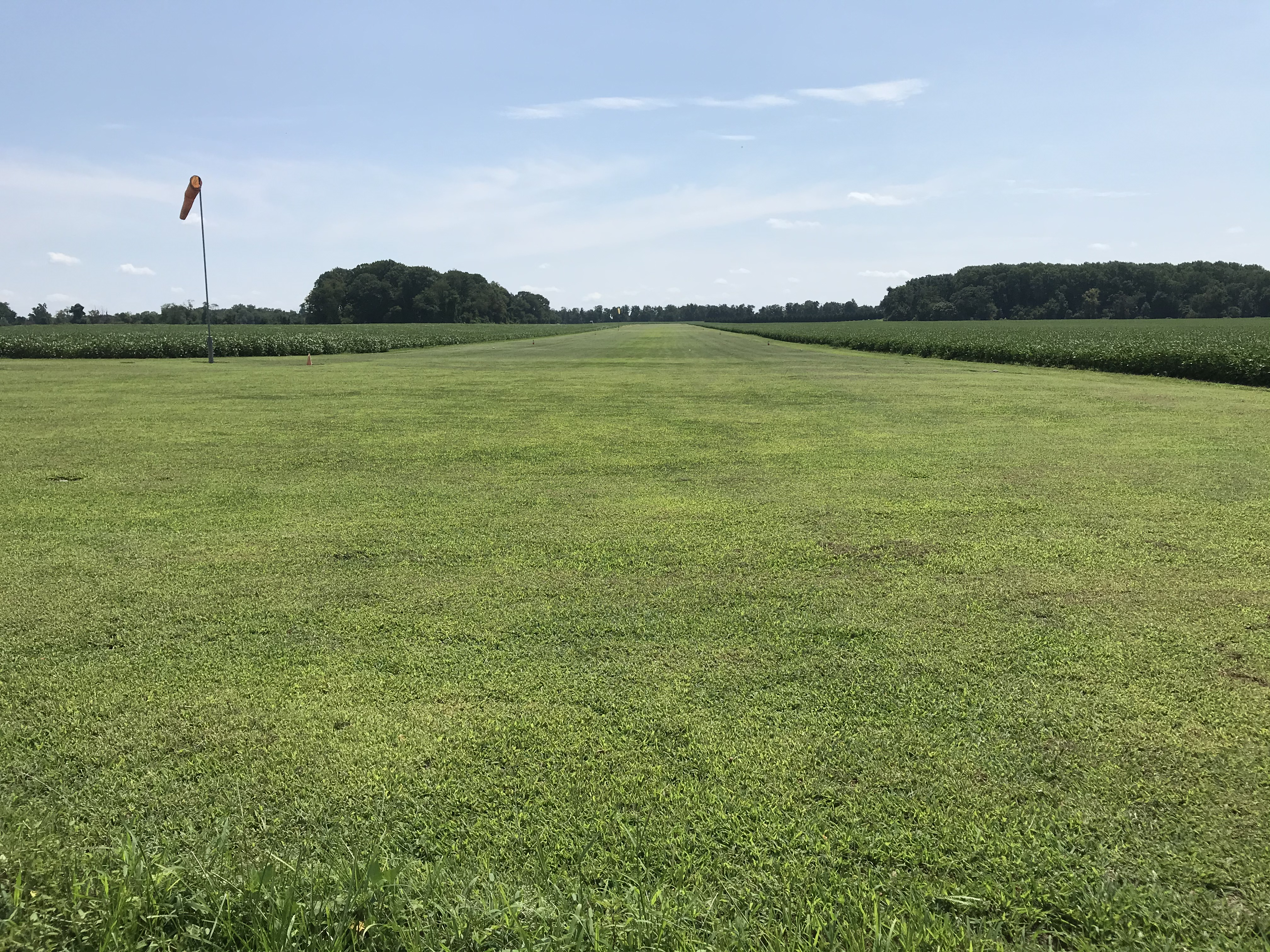
Looking down runway 14 at Hollingshead Airport

Hollingshead Airport (FAA Identifier NJ25) is a privately owned restricted-use airport located in Clarksboro, New Jersey in the United States. It was previously known as Peaslees Airfield. It is located on the former estate of Ambassador Amos J. Peaslee. Hollingshead Airport is located 4.7 nautical miles from Philadelphia International Airport. The airport is situated inside the Class B airspace for Philadelphia International Airport. It is the only Restricted Use airport in the United States within Class B Airspace. The airport and the first hangar were designed by Vincent Kling, a well known Philadelphia architect and avid private pilot who oversaw many of the renovations and additions on the Peaslee estate. Kling would later go on to author the Master Plan for Ronald Reagan Washington National Airport. During construction of the airport tower, Amos J. Peaslee had the workmen install a stone from the Great Wall of China, which he had obtained during a visit to the wall.

== Accidents ==
There have been some minor accidents at Hollingshead Airport. Only one has been recorded by the NTSB. On July 28, 2001 a Mooney M20J crashed while departing Hollingshead Airport. The pilot, his wife, and his son were not injured. The plane was severely damaged, but was subsequently repaired and returned to service. The mechanic who returned the plane got a ride home in N48819 which attempted to take off in the field rather than the runway, and it subsequently nosed-over in the field.
