= Welcome to The Welcome Wagon =

Studio album by The Welcome Wagon
- Released: December 9, 2008
- Genre: Indie folk
- Language: English
- Label: Asthmatic Kitty
- Producer: Sufjan Stevens

The Welcome Wagon chronology
Welcome to The Welcome Wagon (2008)	Purity of Heart Is to Will One Thing – EP (2009)

Professional ratings
Review scores
Source	Rating
Allmusic	link
CHARTattack	link
Pitchfork Media	7.9/10 link

Welcome to The Welcome Wagon is a folk rock music album by The Welcome Wagon, released in 2008. It was produced by Sufjan Stevens, who also arranged the songs, contributed background vocals and played the banjo and occasionally the piano.

== Track listing ==
1. "Up on a Mountain" – 3:34
2. "Sold! To the Nice Rich Man" – 4:11 (Danielson Famile cover)
3. "Unless the Lord the House Shall Build" – 1:46
4. "He Never Said a Mumblin' Word" – 4:38
5. "Hail to the Lord's Anointed" – 3:36
6. "But for You Who Fear My Name" – 3:21
7. "American Legion" – 5:05
8. "You Made My Day" – 4:01
9. "Half a Person" – 2:53 (The Smiths Cover)
10. "Jesus" – 4:30 (Velvet Underground Cover)
11. "I Am a Stranger" – 6:09
12. "Deep Were His Wounds, and Red" – 2:17
13. "Skilled" – 2:08
