= Forevergreen (film) =

- Directed by: Nathan Engelhardt; Jeremy Spears
- Produced by: Steph Gortz; Jennifer Gandrup Sackheim
- Music by: Josh Garrels; Isaac Wardell
- Release date: 2025
- Running time: 13 minutes
- Country: United States

Forevergreen is a 2025 American Christian independent animated fantasy short film written and directed by Nathan Engelhardt & Jeremy Spears. The 13-minute animated short film has been selected in various international film festivals, including Annecy International Animation Film Festival and BFI London Film Festival.

Forevergreen was nominated at the 98th Academy Awards in the category of Best Animated Short Film.

== Plot ==
An abandoned bear cub, desperate for food in the winter, forms a bond with a nurturing forest tree that happily provides the cub with food and shelter. The tree helps raise the cub through the seasons, constructing a toy for the bear and teaching it to grow a new sapling.

One day, the bear discovers a crow eating from a bag of potato chips in a tree. Trying the snack for himself, the bear becomes intrigued and is desperate to find more. The tree tries to discourage and forbid the bear from traveling across the canyon to the campground, but the bear rebels, destroys the sapling, and leaves for the camp.

At the site, the bear explores the area and gorges on junk food and trash that has been left behind, accidentally setting a fire in the process. Fleeing the flames, the bear becomes trapped at the cliffside and is unable to escape. The tree uproots itself and falls across the canyon to create a bridge, saving the bear at the cost of its own life.

After the fire ends, the mournful bear travels down the canyon to the remains of the tree and discovers that the tree is holding the bear's old toy, from which a small sprout is growing. The bear plants and nurtures the sprout, which eventually grows into another tree that bonds with the bear and his descendants.

== Accolades ==
Since its release, the film has been selected for various festivals around the world:

Year	Festivals	Award/Category	Status
2025	Indy Shorts International Film Festival	Animated Audience Choice	Won
2025	Palm Springs International Shorts Fest	Kid's Choice Award - Special Mention	Won
2025	LA Shorts International Film Festival	Best Animated Short	Nominated
2025	Annecy International Animation Film Festival	Canal+ Junior Jury Award	Won
2025	BFI London Film Festival	Best Animated Short	Nominated
2025	Animation Is Film Festival	Best Short Film	Nominated
2025	American Film Institute	Grand Jury Prize	Won
2026	Academy Awards	Best Animated Short Film	Nominated

== See also ==
- List of submissions for the Academy Award for Best Animated Short Film
