= Purity of Heart Is to Will One Thing (EP) =

EP by The Welcome Wagon
- Released: 2009
- Recorded: 2001–2008
- Studio: Brooklyn, New York City, New York, United States
- Genre: Indie folk, Gospel
- Length: 12:06
- Language: English
- Label: Asthmatic Kitty
- Producer: Sufjan Stevens

The Welcome Wagon chronology
Welcome to The Welcome Wagon (2008)	Purity of Heart Is to Will One Thing (2009)	Precious Remedies Against Satan’s Devices (2012)

Purity of Heart Is to Will One Thing is a 2009 EP by The Welcome Wagon, released by Asthmatic Kitty and produced by Sufjan Stevens. "There Is a Fountain Filled with Blood" previously appeared on the various artists compilation To Spirit Back the Mews, released by Asthmatic Kitty in 2001. All of the songs from the EP are outtakes from their debut album Welcome to The Welcome Wagon.

The proceeds from sales of the EP through iTunes Store go to Freeset—a fair trade organization working with women in Kolkata. The album was initially made available through the Urbana missions conference and later released internationally on January 5, 2010.

== Track listing ==
1. "Oh Christ, Our Hope" (words: unknown author, 7th or 8th Century as "Jesu nostra redemptio, Amor et desiderium"; translated from Latin to English by John Chandler. music: Vito Aiuto) – 2:46
2. "Up on a Mountain" (Demo) (Vito Aiuto) – 3:14
3. "I Am Not Skilled to Understand" (words: Dorothy Greenwell. music: Vito Aiuto) – 2:31
4. "There Is a Fountain Filled with Blood" (words: William Cowper. music: Vito Aiuto) – 3:35

== Personnel ==
"O Christ Our Hope"

- Monique Aiuto and Vito Aiuto – horns, drums, guitars, and vocals

"Up on a Mountain"

- Monique Aiuto – vocals
- Vito Aiuto – acoustic guitar and vocals
- Sufjan Stevens – acoustic guitar

"I Am Not Skilled"

- Monique Aiuto and Vito Aiuto – horns and vocals
- Alex Foote – electric guitar
- Jay Foote – double bass

"There Is a Fountain Filled with Blood"

- Monique Aiuto and Vito Aiuto – guitar, banjo, Casio keyboard, and vocals
