= Sanders Bohlke =

American musician (born 1984)

- Born: 28 February 1984 (age 42); Sardis, Mississippi, US
- Genres: Folk; indie; experimental; ambient
- Occupation: Singer-songwriter
- Instruments: vocals; keyboards
- Years active: 2006–present
- Label: Communicating Vessels
- Website: sandersbohlke.com

Sanders Bohlke (born 28 February 1984) is an American songwriter and recording artist born in Sardis, Mississippi. His music has been variously described as experimental folk and indie alternative. He released his self-titled, debut album in 2006 and has since issued two more, as well as three EPs, several soundtrack albums, and numerous singles.

== Career ==
Bohlke released his debut, self-titled album, in 2006. His second album, Ghost Boy, came out in 2012. It was produced by Jeffrey Cain of Remy Zero and features engineering and mixing work by Darrell Thorp.

In 2016, Bohlke formed the duo Rookie Season with the drummer Brad Odum, and a year later, they released The Collide.

Between 2018 and 2019, Bohlke collaborated with the German EDM producer Chris Deluca on a project called Svibes, which released several singles.

Bohlke composed the music for the short films Jack's Apocalypse (2015), Red Folder (2016), Passage (2017), and Washed Away (2019). He has also worked on the short film Ricochet, in which he got co-directing, production, and soundtrack credits.

In 2025, Bohlke issued his third studio album, titled Looking for a God.

== Discography ==
=== Solo ===
Studio albums

- Sanders Bohlke (2006)
- Ghost Boy (2012)
- Looking for a God (2025)

EPs

- The Night (2015)
- And I Will Close My Eyes and See the Red Sun (2023)
- Screaming Underwater (2025)

Soundtracks

- Jack's Apocalypse (2015)
- Red Folder (2016)
- Passage (2017)
- Washed Away (2019)
- Ricochet (2019)

Singles

- "The Weight of Us" (2009)
- "Somewhere the War" (2009)
- "Search and Destroy" (2009)
- "Misdirection" (2010)
- "I'm Gonna Make It" (2010)
- "Quiet Ye Voices" (2010)
- "Nearly Summer" (2012)
- "Elevate" (2012)
- "Soldier" (2014)
- "Never Wake" (2018)
- "The Wolves" (2023)
- "God Shakes the Ground" (2025)
- "Fire" (2025)
- "Let You Down" (2025)

Appearances

- "He Will Not Cry Out" He Will Not Cry Out (Bifrost Arts, 2013)
- "I Can't Love You" Killers (Funkstörung, 2015)

=== Rookie Season ===
- The Collide (2017)

=== Svibes ===
- "Colored Walls/Fly Low" (2018)
- "The Ra Ra Ra" (2018)
- "What You Need" (2018)
- "Heathen" (2018)
- "Dreaming of the Pause" (2019)
- "Quicksand" (2019)
- "Don't Let Go" (2019)
- "Back & Forth" (2019)
