= Mason Jar Music =

American audio/visual production company

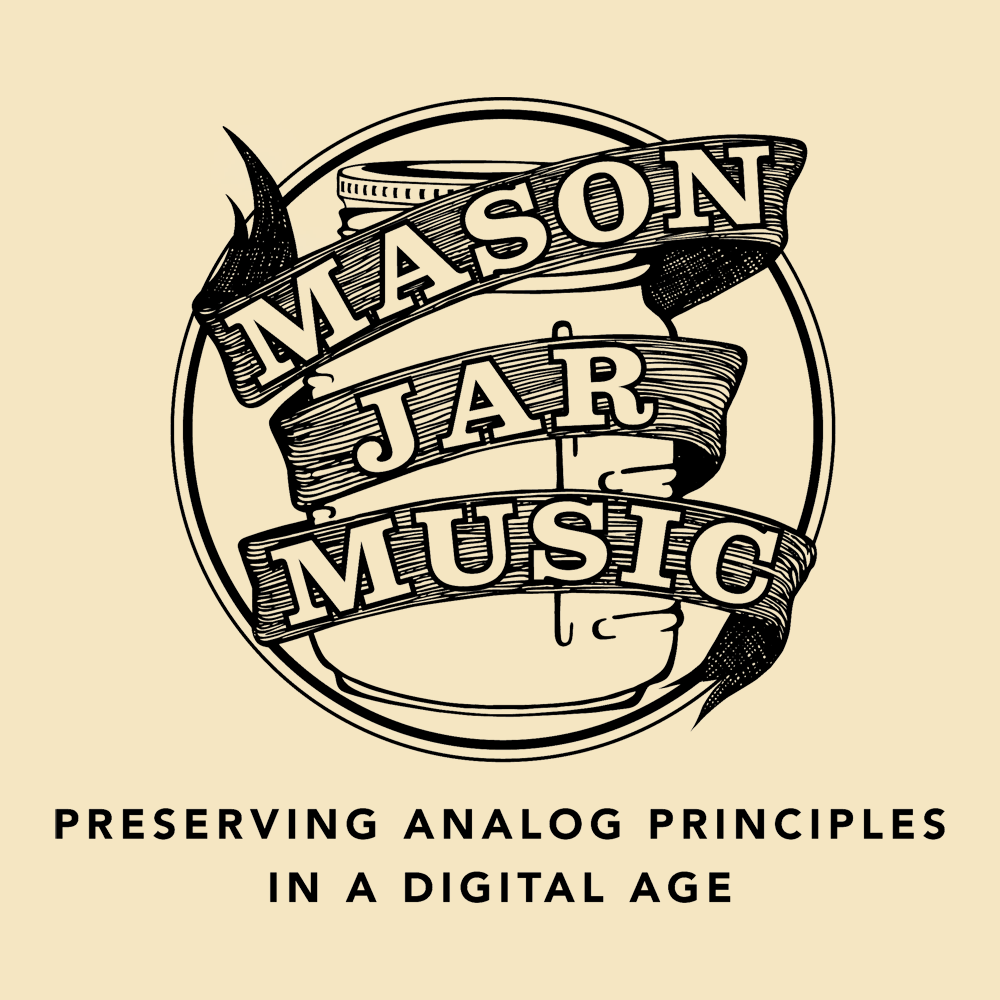
- Founded: 2010
- Founder: Dan Knobler, Jon Seale
- Genre: Folk, Americana
- Country of origin: US
- Location: Brooklyn, New York
- Official website: masonjarmusic.com

Mason Jar Music (founded June 2010) is an audio/visual production company and creative collective based in Brooklyn, New York co-founded by Dan Knobler and Jon Seale.

== Overview ==
Mason Jar Music has produced audio and video content for artists and clients including Chris Thile, Andrew Bird, Feist, Rosanne Cash, The Wood Brothers, Abigail Washburn, Béla Fleck, The Food Network, and Sony Music Entertainment. They are best known for a series of organic live performance videos filmed and recorded in non-traditional spaces. "The Mason Jar Music team offers to do all the work. They rearrange the artist's music for orchestra. Set up the space. Bring in musicians and a film crew. All the artists have to do is show up – and not be too surprised by the peeling paint on the walls."

Mason Jar Music was named one of the 10 Most Innovative Music Companies by Fast Company for "pioneering a new concert model." Their work has been featured on NPR, CNN, Paste, Billboard, TIME, CMT, Variety, NBC New York, The Village Voice, The Huffington Post, and other major media outlets.

== Releases ==
=== The Sea In Between ===
A music documentary centered around singer/songwriter Josh Garrels. Filmed and recorded on location in Mayne Island, BC, the film features several live musical performances and weaves together multiple narratives including those of Josh and the Mason Jar Music musicians. "The movie itself could be described as a 'a visual LP.' It consists of 10 of Garrels' songs recorded in various locales across the island ranging from inside St. Mary Magdalene Anglican Church to a neighboring farm to numerous spots along the island's surrounding bays. Each musical piece highlights a different aspect of Garrel's life—as a husband and father to three toddlers, as a songwriter perfecting his craft and as a human seeking to assure his faith and find his place in this world."

The film was released independently on January 29, 2013

=== The Storm is Passing Over ===
A compilation album to benefit the victims of Hurricane Sandy in New York and New Jersey. Features notable independent folk artists performing original renditions of "classic American storm songs." Released independently on December 26, 2012, all proceeds are donated to the relief efforts of Occupy Sandy. "The album's 15 tracks were recorded and mixed over just a two-week period in December, 2012, by a range of artists that included Rosanne Cash, Abigail Washburn and Bela Fleck, Town Hall, Tift Merritt, and many more. Each track of The Storm is Passing Over centers around a real performance, recorded live, and the raw artistic passion is palpable."

=== Decoration Day ===
A series of covers compilations released annually around Memorial Day weekend. The project began in 2012 "when a recording session fell through, the crew threw together a last minute marathon collaboration with artists from the indie-folk community. The result was a six track EP, entitled Decoration Day, dedicated to some of the greatest American folk songs of the last two centuries." Each year's release features a new batch of artists and studio musicians, as well as a new collection of covers. Volume 1 (2012) features classic American folk and gospel, Volume 2 covers 1960s soul, Volume 3 tackles songs of the 1990s, in honor of MJM co-founder Dan Knobler moving to Nashville, TN, "Volume 4" explores songs about home: finding it, leaving it, loving it, hating it, missing it, and returning to it. Decoration Day, Volume 2 was selected by NoiseTrade as one of its 2013 staff picks.

== Clients and collaborators ==
- Abigail Washburn
- Adam Kromelow
- Adriel Denae
- Andrew Bird
- Aoife O'Donovan
- Alicia Keys
- Béla Fleck
- Ben Sollee
- Chris Thile
- Cory Chisel
- Dawn Landes
- Dylan Reynolds
- Edgar Meyer
- EMEFE
- Emily Elbert
- Feist
- Flearoy
- John Medeski
- Josh Garrels
- Lacrymosa
- Lake Street Dive
- Laura Gibson
- Lucius
- Michael Daves
- My Brightest Diamond
- Noam Pikelny
- Rosanne Cash
- Rodney Crowell
- Sarah Jarosz
- Sara Watkins
- Sony Music Entertainment
- The Food Network
- The Gunderson Family
- Tim O'Brien
- The Wood Brothers
- Tift Merritt
- Town Hall
- Zusha
