= As If Apart =

Studio album by Chris Cohen
- Released: May 6, 2016
- Recorded: January 2014 – December 2015
- Studio: Los Angeles
- Genre: Psychedelic pop
- Length: 32:05
- Label: Captured Tracks

Chris Cohen chronology
Overgrown Path (2012)	As If Apart (2016)	Chris Cohen (2019)

As If Apart is the second studio album by American singer-songwriter Chris Cohen, released on May 6, 2016, by Captured Tracks.

== Track listing ==
Lyrics were contributed by Zach Phillips on two songs: "Memory" and "As If Apart."

1. "Torrey Pine"
2. "As If Apart"
3. "Drink from a Silver Cup"
4. "Memory"
5. "In a Fable"
6. "Needle and Thread"
7. "The Lender"
8. "Sun Has Gone Away"
9. "No Plan"
10. "Yesterday's On My Mind"

== Personnel ==
- Chris Cohen - drums, bass, guitar, piano, keyboard, vocal
