= Dig That Treasure =

Studio album by Cryptacize
- Released: February 19, 2008
- Genre: Indie rock
- Length: 31:52
- Label: Asthmatic Kitty
- Producer: Cryptacize

Professional ratings
Review scores
| Source | Rating |
|---|---|
| Pop Matters | 7/10 stars |
| Crawdaddy | (?) |
| Spin.com | 3/5 stars |

Dig That Treasure is the debut album by the California pop band Cryptacize, released in 2008. It was released on Asthmatic Kitty. The title of the album was borrowed from a musical written by Kip Cohen in 1958.

== Track listing ==
1. "Stop Watch" – 3:58
2. "No Coins" – 2:55
3. "Heaven Is Human" – 2:46
4. "Water Witching Wishes" – 3:12
5. "The Shape Above" – 2:25
6. "Cosmic Sing-a-long" – 1:54
7. "How Did the Actor Laugh?" – 2:13
8. "Willpower" – 2:57
9. "We'll Never Dream Again" – 3:20
10. "Dig That Treasure" – 2:51
11. "Say You Will" – 2:36

== Personnel ==
- Michael Carreira - percussion
- Chris Cohen – vocals, guitar
- Nedelle Torrisi - vocals, autoharp, guitar, strings
