= Tell Another Joke at the Ol' Choppin' Block =

Studio album by Danielson Famile
- Released: January 30, 1997
- Genre: Alternative rock/Indie rock/Gospel
- Length: 54:34
- Label: Tooth & Nail Records

Danielson Famile chronology
A Prayer for Every Hour (1995)	Tell Another Joke at the Ol' Choppin' Block (1997)	Tri-Danielson!!! (Alpha) (1998)

Professional ratings
Review scores
Source	Rating
AllMusic	4/5 stars

Tell Another Joke at the Ol' Choppin' Block is the second full-length album from New Jersey indie rock band Danielson Famile.

== Track listing ==
1. "A No No" – 3:51
2. "Ye Olde Battleaxe" – 4:39
3. "Me to Datee" – 3:32
4. "The Lord's Rest" – 4:58
5. "Flesh Thang" – 2:26
6. "Jersey Loverboy" – 4:54
7. "I Am My Beloved's" – 2:19
8. "Big Baby" – 3:13
9. "Deviled Egg" – 4:23
10. "Quest for Thrills" – 4:30
11. "Smooth Death" – 3:19
12. "Jokin' at the Block" – 12:31
