= The Curtains =

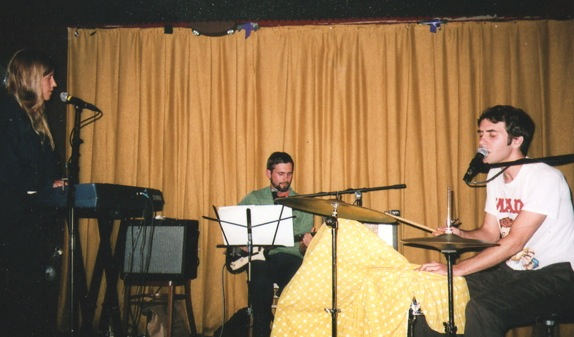
- The Curtains performing live in 2006

Background information
- Origin: San Francisco, California, U.S.
- Genres: Experimental rock, electronic rock, instrumental
- Years active: 2000–2007
- Members: Chris Cohen
- Past members: Annie Lewandowski; John Ringhofer; Nedelle Torrisi; Corey Fogel; Greg Saunier; Andrew Maxwell; Jamie Peterson; Trevor Shimizu; Satomi Matsuzaki; Jordan Dalrymple

The Curtains is an American band founded by Chris Cohen and visual artist Trevor Shimizu in San Francisco, California in 2000.

== Style ==
Their first three albums are mostly instrumental music which uses electric guitar, Realistic Concertmate MG-1 and drums.

Initially influenced by film soundtracks, TV jingles, West Coast jazz, and early electronic music, the Curtains slowly gravitated towards melodic, vocal-based pop music.

== History ==
Since 2002, the Curtains have released four full-length albums, one split CD, and several 7-inches on various labels, including a limited-edition lathe cut. The band's lineup changed often, with principal songwriter Chris Cohen being the only continuous member.

The Curtains toured the Western U.S. with Maher Shalal Hash Baz in 2004 and recorded as members of that band on the record Faux Depart. They have also opened for such bands as Red Krayola, Saccharine Trust, Young People, Joan of Arc, Glass Candy, The Dead C, Burning Star Core, Open City, Final Fantasy, and Beirut.

== Discography ==
=== Albums ===
- Hit Car Tunes (2001)
- Fast Talks (Thin Wrist, 2002)
- Flybys (Thin Wrist, 2003)
- Make Us Two Crayons on the Floor (Yik Yak, 2004) split with Maher Shalal Hash Baz
- Vehicles of Travel (Frenetic, 2004)
- Calamity (Asthmatic Kitty, 2006)

=== Singles ===
- "Athletes in the Stars" b/w "Watch for the Eliminator" (Snowy Visitor, 2000)
- "Airplane Dives" b/w "Strive, Lifeforms, Strive" (Collective Jyrk, 2004) split with Ghost to Falco
- "Go Lucky" b/w "World's Most Dangerous Woman" (Tomlab, 2006)
