= Ships (album) =

Studio album by Danielson
- Released: May 9, 2006
- Genres: Alternative rock; indie rock; Christian rock
- Length: 42:10
- Label: Secretly Canadian
- Producer: Daniel Smith

Danielson chronology
Brother Is to Son (2004)	Ships (2006)	Best of Gloucester County (2011)

Professional ratings
Review scores
Source	Rating
AllMusic	4.5/5 stars
Pitchfork	9.1/10
PopMatters	6/10
Slant Magazine	3.5/5 stars
Stylus Magazine	B
Tiny Mix Tapes	4/5 stars

Ships is the seventh full-length album by New Jersey indie rock band Danielson. The album was a massive collaboration among Daniel Smith and various other musicians.

== Track listing ==
1. "Ship the Majestic Suffix" – 2:54
2. "Cast It at the Setting Sail" – 3:30
3. "Bloodbook on the Halfshell" – 4:50
4. "Did I Step on Your Trumpet" – 3:06
5. "When It Comes to You I'm Lazy" – 3:53
6. "Two Sitting Ducks" – 5:04
7. "My Lion Sleeps Tonight" – 3:03
8. "Kids Pushing Kids" – 6:17
9. "Time That Bald Sexton" – 3:56
10. "He Who Flattened Your Flame Is Gettin' Torched" – 2:51
11. "Five Stars and Two Thumbs Up" – 2:46

== Personnel ==
- Steve Poponi, Dave Downham – recording (Gradwell)
- Chris Cohen – electric guitar, vocals
- Ben Swanson – recording, graphics
- Luke Mosling – "ships" suffix contest winner (1172)
- Lenny Smith – vocals, claps
- Rachel Galloway – flute, vocals
- Tom Eaton – trumpet
- Jedidiah Slaboda – vocals, claps
- Judy Miller – publicity (Motormouth)
- Christiaan Palladino – keys, vocals, mixing assistance, recording
- Satomi Matsuzaki – bass guitar
- Megan Slaboda – glock, marimba, vocal
- Brian McTear – mixing engineer (Miner Street)
- Alan Douches – mastering (West Westside)
- David Smith – drum kit
- Lilly Smith – vocals, claps
- Ted Velykis – orchestration, mixing assistant, bass guitar, bass clarinet
- Josiah Wolf – drum kit
- Ida Smith – vocals, claps
- Andrew Smith – drums, percussion
- Melissa Palladino – violin, vocal
- Elin Smith – vocal, support
- Chris Swanson – project manager
- Erik Carter – live performance arrangements (Kork Agency)
- Aaron DeVries – ships contest judge
- Marian Smith – support
- Amy Morrissey – mixing assistant (Miner Street)
- Nicole Roeder – graphics
- Emil Nikolaisen – mixing assistant
- Paul Gold – lacquers (Brooklyn Phono)
- Yoni Wolf – recording
- Ken Fabianovicz – helper
- Jon Galloway – recording
- Sufjan Stevens – oboe, flutes, whistles, glock
- John Ringhofer – trombone, vocal, recording
- Greg Saunier – drum kit, vocal, recorder
- John Dieterich – electric guitar, vocals
- Daniel Smith – songs, vocal, acoustic guitar, production, artwork
