= Bifrost Arts =

American Christian musical organization

Bifrost Arts is an ecumenical religious organization closely linked to the Presbyterian Church in America that produces written and recorded religious music, and frequently performs at Christian Universities and conferences. Bifrost Arts was co-founded by Joseph Pensak and Isaac Wardell.

Bifrost Arts is unique in its approach to religious music in that it generally employs musicians whose success exists outside of the traditional Christian music industry. In 2009, Bifrost Arts' Come O Spirit! Anthology of Hymns & Spiritual Songs Volume 1 (Sounds Familyre Records) was ranked by Christianity Today as the No. 4 record of the year. Later that same year, Salvation Is Created: A Christmas Record From Bifrost Arts was released.

Notable contributors to Bifrost Arts' recordings have included Joseph Pensak, Sufjan Stevens, David Bazan, Rosie Thomas, Leigh Nash, Damien Jurado, The Welcome Wagon, Derek Webb, Denison Witmer, Devon Sproule, Shara Worden, Laura Gibson, The Gregory Brothers, Lenny Smith, Mason Neely, J. Tillman, Trent Dabbs, Isaac Wardell, Diane Birch, and Sanders Bohlke.

== Discography ==
- Come O Spirit! (2009)
- Salvation Is Created (2009)
- He Will Not Cry Out (2013)
- Lamentations (2016)
