= Tri-Danielson!!! (Alpha) =

Studio album by Danielson Famile
- Released: January 22, 1998
- Genres: Alternative rock, indie rock, gospel
- Length: 39:01
- Label: Tooth & Nail Records

Danielson Famile chronology
Tell Another Joke at the Ol' Choppin' Block (1997)	Tri-Danielson!!! (Alpha) (1998)	Tri-Danielson!!! (Omega) (1999)

Professional ratings
Review scores
Source	Rating
AllMusic	4/5 stars

Tri-Danielson!!! (Alpha) is an album by the New Jersey indie rock band Danielson Famile, released in 1998. Part of the album was recorded at Ventnor Methodist Church, in Ventnor City, New Jersey.

== Track listing ==
1. "Tri-Danielson!!!" – 0:21
2. "Southern Paws" – 2:57
3. "Rubber-Necker" – 1:46
4. "Body English" – 2:07
5. "Runnin' to Brother" – 3:00
6. "Between the Lines of the Scout Signs" – 1:36
7. "A Meeting with Your Maker" – 3:36
8. "Gorgeous New Age" – 3:07
9. "Pottymouth" – 3:33
10. "The Elderly + the Little Ones Unite in Song + Dance" – 6:15
11. "Holy Kisser's Block Party" – 3:51
12. "Flesh" – 1:44
13. "Lord Did You Hear Harrison" – 5:04
