= Fetch the Compass Kids =

Studio album by Danielson Famile
- Released: April 24, 2001
- Recorded: Springfield, Pennsylvania on June 16–21, 2000 and Chicago, Illinois on August 10–13, 2000
- Genres: Alternative rock, indie rock, gospel, experimental pop
- Length: 40:52
- Labels: Secretly Canadian (original release), Fire Records (UK) (2013 reissue)
- Producers: Daniel Smith; Chris Palladino

Danielson Famile chronology
Tri-Danielson!!! (Omega) (1998)	Fetch the Compass Kids (2001)	Brother Is to Son (2006)

Professional ratings
Review scores
Source	Rating
AllMusic	4/5 stars
Pitchfork	6.8/10

Fetch the Compass Kids is the fifth full-length album by New Jersey indie rock band Danielson Famile. A portion of the album was recorded by Steve Albini in Chicago at his Electrical Audio studios.

== Track listing ==
1. "We Don't Say Shut Up" – 2:06
2. "Let Us ABC" – 2:31
3. "Good News for the Pus Pickers" – 3:51
4. "Fetch the Compass Kids" – 3:43
5. "Rallying the Dominoes" – 3:03
6. "Sing to the Singer" – 3:16
7. "The Wheel Made Man" – 2:35
8. "Singers Go First" – 2:58
9. "Fathom the Nine Fruits Pie" – 2:37
10. "Who the Hello" – 3:55
11. "Can We Camp at Your Feet" – 5:19
12. "Farmers Serve the Waiters" – 4:58
