= Wolfert, New Jersey =

Populated place in Gloucester County, New Jersey, US

- Unincorporated community
- Wolfert's location in Gloucester County (Inset: Gloucester County in New Jersey) Wolfert (New Jersey) Wolfert (the United States)
- Coordinates: 39°47′02″N 75°15′40″W
- Country: United States
- State: New Jersey
- County: Gloucester
- Township: East Greenwich
- Elevation: 49 ft (15 m)
- GNIS feature ID: 881897

Wolfert was an unincorporated community located within East Greenwich Township in Gloucester County, in the U.S. state of New Jersey.

== History ==
An early settler was Solomon Lippincott, who purchased 200 acres (81 ha) of land at that location in 1741. In 1756, a local branch of the Society of Friends used Lippincott's home as a place of worship. "Solomons Graveyard" (extant) was established on the property, the earliest burials dating from 1795.

== Transportation ==
The Swedesboro Railroad built its line from Woodbury to Swedesboro through the town, opening in October 1869 under lease to the West Jersey Railroad. It is still operated for freight traffic by the Southern Railroad of New Jersey.
