= Rachel Davis DuBois =

Rachel Davis DuBois (January 25, 1892 - March 30, 1993) was an American educator, human rights activist and pioneer of intercultural education.

== Early life ==
Rachel Davis Dubois was born on January 25, 1892, in the Clarksboro section of East Greenwich Township, New Jersey. She grew up on a farm and was raised as a Quaker. She graduated from Bucknell University.

She was married to Nathan Stewart DuBois on 19 June 1915. Prior to the marriage, Nathan expressed doubts about having children. Following her disappointment, Rachel agreed to a childless marriage with the understanding that she would be free to pursue a career.

== Teaching career and the development of the Woodbury Plan ==
In 1924, DuBois was hired as a teacher at Woodbury High School in New Jersey. Shortly after assuming this position, and with the support of several colleagues, DuBois formed a senior assembly centered around the subject of "Americanization." The group met twice a month to stage productions highlighting the cultural contributions to American society by various ethnic and immigrant groups. While their initial emphasis was on creating tolerance for those who are different from one's self, the focus soon shifted to fostering "sympathetic" attitudes. The sessions were very popular with students and fellow teachers, but members of the community did not approve of DuBois's views on racial equality, women's rights and pacifism. At the urging of the local American Legion, she was asked to resign. However, DuBois was a tenured teacher; thus, she was able to retain her position and continue with the assemblies. DuBois continued in this capacity until her resignation in 1930, when she left to attend Teachers College at Columbia University. She wanted to "study how attitudes are formed and can be changed."

== The development of Intercultural Education ==
Even while attending Teachers College, DuBois' work with the Woodbury Plan continued. A number of schools were interested in implementing the plan into their curricula, and to manage all the requests, the Service Bureau for Human Relations was formed, with DuBois as the director. Around the same time, the organization recognized that educating fellow teachers was nearly as important as educating students. Thus, the Service Bureau began offering courses for the educators at all the schools where they operated. In 1933, DuBois was invited to teach a course on the subject at Boston University. Over the next several years, the Service Bureau led workshops on intercultural education at conferences and universities, including a groundbreaking workshop at Sarah Lawrence. At this workshop, teachers were asked to share their classroom problems within small groups and then talk together to find solutions. Elements of intercultural education were woven throughout the workshop.

On page 76 of her memoir, DuBois writes, "As far as I know we were the first to use the term intercultural education."

== "Americans All, Immigrants All" ==
In 1939, DuBois and her associates came up with the idea for a radio show, in an effort to broadcast their message to a larger audience. DuBois approached John Studebaker, the U.S. Commissioner of Education, about the program and together, they arranged for CBS to air the program in a series of 26 half-hour episodes. To facilitate the coordination and planning, DuBois was appointed as a consultant to the U.S. Office of Education. After its 26-week run, CBS received an award from the Women's National Radio Committee for the best program of the year for public service.

== Group Conversation ==
DuBois is credited with being the founder of "group conversation." Group conversation is a technique in which people from different ethnic and cultural backgrounds come together and discuss various topics, such as spring festivals, in order to discover their underlying commonalities.

== Death ==
A resident of Woodstown, New Jersey, she died at age 101 on March 30,1993.

== Books and other writings ==
- Pioneers of the New World, (1930).
- A School and Community Project in Developing Sympathetic Attitudes toward Other Races and Nations, (1934).
- The Jews in American Life, (1935). With Emma Schweppe.
- The Germans in American Life, (1936). With Emma Schweppe.
- Methods of Achieving Racial Justice: Discussion Outline for Church, School and Adult Education Groups, (1936).
- Bantu Beliefs and Magic: with Particular Reference to the Kikuyu and Kamba Tribes of Kenya Colony; Together with Some Reflections on East Africa after the War, (1938).
- Adventures in Intercultural Education: A Manual for Secondary School Teachers, (1938).
- National Unity through Intercultural Education, (1940).
- Get Together Americans: Friendly Approaches to Racial and Cultural Conflicts through the Neighborhood-Home Festival, (1943).
- Build Together Americans: Adventures in Intercultural Education for the Secondary School, (1945).
- Neighbors in Action: A Manual for Local Leaders in Intergroup Relations, (1950).
- Know Your Neighbors: A Handbook for Group Conversation Leaders, (1955).
- The Art of Group Conversation: A New Breakthrough in Social Communication, (1963).
- A Handbook for Leaders of Quaker Dialogues, (1964).
- Reducing Social Tension and Conflict through the Group Conversation Method, (1971).
- Deepening Quaker Faith and Practice through the Use of the Three-Session Quaker Dialogue, (1976).
- All This and Something More: Pioneering in Intercultural Education, (1984).

== Archival collections ==
- The Rachel Davis Dubois Papers held at Friends Historical Library of Swarthmore College.
- Rachel Davis DuBois papers. Immigration History Research Center Archives, University of Minnesota Libraries.
