= Brother Is to Son =

Studio album by Brother Danielson
- Released: June 8, 2004
- Genre: Alternative rock
- Label: Secretly Canadian

Brother Danielson chronology
Fetch the Compass Kids (2001)	Brother Is to Son (2004)	Ships (2006)

Professional ratings
Review scores
Source	Rating
AllMusic	4/5 stars
Pitchfork	7.1/10

Brother Is to Son is the sixth full-length album by New Jersey indie rock band Brother Danielson.

== Track listing ==
1. "Things Against Stuff"
2. "Cookin’ Mid-County"
3. "Animal in Every Corner"
4. "Daughters Will Tune You"
5. "Our Givest"
6. "Sweet Sweeps"
7. "Perennial Wine"
8. "Hammers Sitting Still"
9. "Physician Heal Yourself"
10. "Brother: Son"
