= Vehicles of Travel =

Studio album by The Curtains
- Released: 2004
- Genre: Pop music; art rock
- Length: 35:01
- Label: Frenetic
- Producer: The Curtains

The Curtains chronology
Flybys (2003)	Vehicles of Travel (2004)	Calamity (2006)

Professional ratings
Review scores
Source	Rating
Foxy Digitalis	9/10 stars
Pitchfork Media	6/10 stars
Tiny Mix Tapes	4.5/5 stars

Vehicles of Travel is the third album by California pop music band The Curtains, released in 2004 on the independent, San Francisco-based Frenetic Records label. Personnel on this record includes Chris Cohen and Greg Saunier, both members of the band Deerhoof.

== Track listing ==
1. April Gallions
2. Medallion Arrangement
3. Fletcher’s Favorite
4. A Sudden Prospect
5. Kites for Rookies
6. Won’t Make It
7. Personal Resources
8. Feeling Station
9. Ringmaster’s Reverie
10. Observation Towers
11. Crooked Weapon
12. Cops in Cologne
13. The Cobbler’s Key
14. Nite Crew
15. Hooligans
16. City of Paris
17. The Gadabouts
18. Seabreeze Melody
19. Soopeaters!
20. Pagoda Defenders
21. The Bronx Zoobreak
22. Unmentionable
23. Chestnut Kid Returns

== Personnel ==
- Chris Cohen – vocals, guitar, bass, keyboards, drums
- Andrew Maxwell - vocals, drums, guitar
- Greg Saunier - vocals, keyboards
