= Flybys (album) =

Studio album by The Curtains
- Released: 2003
- Genre: Pop music, art rock
- Label: Thin Wrist
- Producer: The Curtains

The Curtains chronology
Fast Talks (2002)	Flybys (2003)	Vehicles of Travel (2004)

Professional ratings
Review scores
Source	Rating
Dusted	(not rated) link
Allmusic	link
Exclaim!	(not rated) link
Impact Press	(not rated) link

Flybys is the second full-length album by California pop music band The Curtains, released in 2003 on the independent, Los Angeles–based Thin Wrist label. Personnel on this record includes Chris Cohen and Greg Saunier, both members of the band Deerhoof.

== Track listing ==
1. Park Work
2. The Burl
3. Computer Finch
4. Bummer with Cakes
5. Time Center
6. Watch for: The Eliminator
7. Fast Talks
8. Blink, Professor
9. Asterisks by Moonlight
10. Hatching the New Guy
11. Partners
12. Death Constellation
13. Binotic Ting
14. Moment with Plankton
15. Telegraph Victories
16. Saga
17. Observations
18. Pure Bronze
19. The Shooter
20. Alpine Hunter
21. It's the Bunklords
22. Snowy Visitors

== Personnel ==
- Chris Cohen – guitar, keyboards
- Andrew Maxwell – vocals, drums
- Greg Saunier – synthesizer
- Trevor Shimizu – keyboards
- Jamie Peterson – electronics
