= Nedelle Torrisi =

American musician

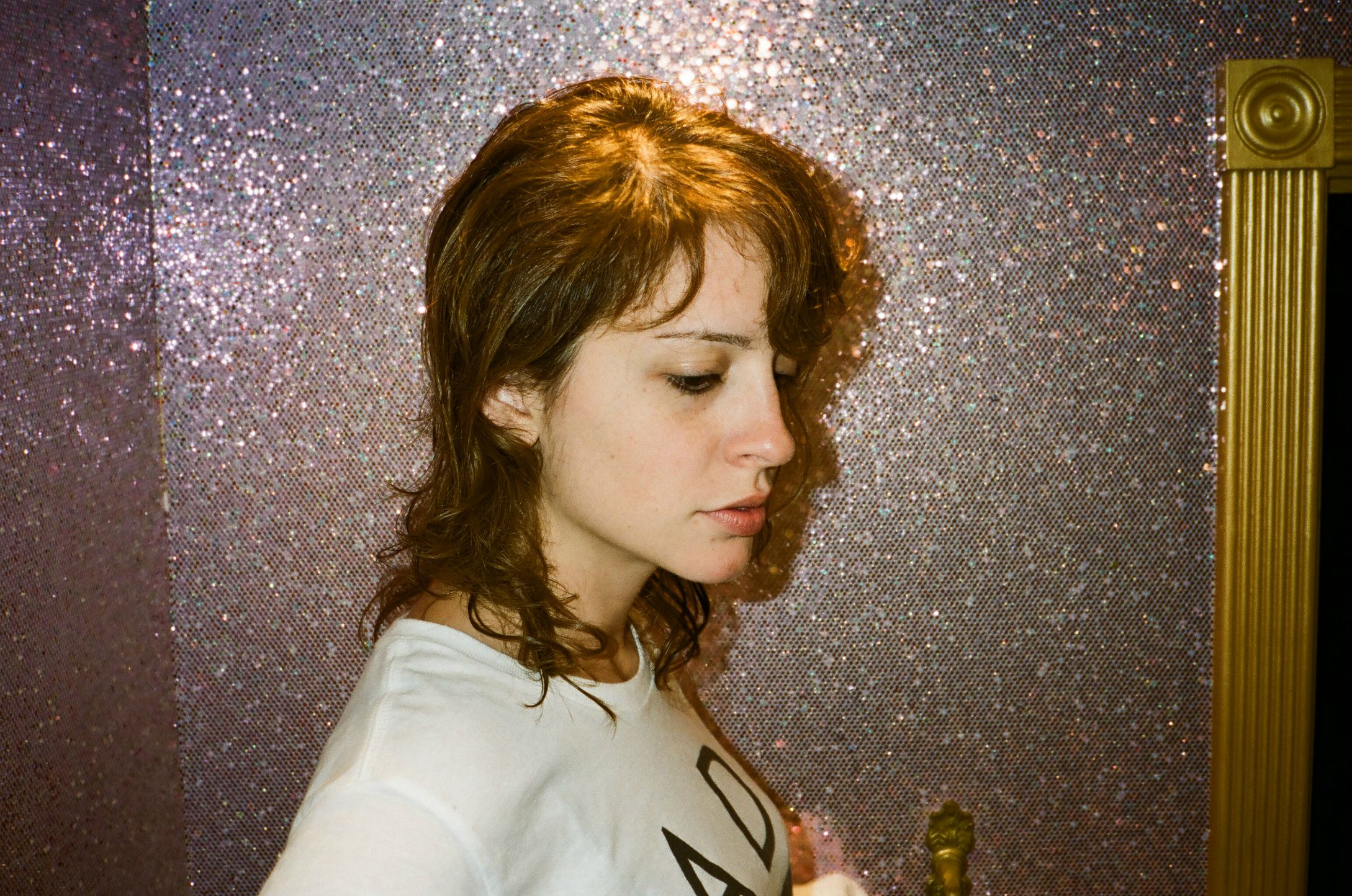

Background information
- Born: Vacaville, California
- Occupation: Musician
- Instruments: Vocals, guitar, piano, violin

Nedelle Torrisi is an American musician who lives in Los Angeles, California.

== Biography ==
Torrisi grew up studying classical violin and performing in musicals. Her mother is an ex-nun and pianist, while her father was an ex-Jesuit priest and jazz drummer. Her brother is a clarinetist and neuroscientist. Torrisi studied jazz voice at Berklee College of Music, and earned her BA in jazz/world music history from San Francisco State University.

== Musical career ==
She has released and toured using her first name only, her full name, and as Cryptacize with Chris Cohen. As a solo act, she has opened tours for Of Montreal, Deerhoof, Destroyer, Fred Thomas, Jens Lekman, Julia Holter, Magnolia Electric Co., and Xiu Xiu.

Her first solo album, From the Lion's Mouth was released by Kill Rock Stars on February 22, 2005. Years later in an interview, actor and rapper Donald Glover spoke highly of the song "Tell Me a Story". The album The Locksmith Cometh was released in 2007 via the Tangrams7 label.

Her debut album using her full name was self-titled, and released in 2013. It was made available through online distribution only. In February 2014 this self-titled album was reissued on vinyl LP through the Ethereal Sequence record label, and distributed by Drag City. The vinyl LP was renamed Advice from Paradise.

In 2017 Torrisi released a collaborative split 7-inch with Julia Holter and Ramona Gonzalez, aka Nite Jewel. The 7-inch record, released by the Domino record label, featured two versions of a Depeche Mode cover song, "Condemnation." Proceeds from the sales were donated to a mental health organization in honor of their late friend and collaborator, director Travis Peterson.

In May 2018 a solo album Only For You was released on Frenchkiss Records. Torrisi has also collaborated with Billy Uomo on a series of ten EPs that he is currently releasing on Terrible Records.

From 2022-2024 Torrisi attended the BMI Lehman Engel Musical Theatre Workshop, notable for being an environment in which musical theatre composer + lyricist collaborations form. Notable collaborations to form in the workshop include Alan Menken and Howard Ashman, Robert Lopez and Kristen Anderson-Lopez, and Tom Kitt and Brian Yorkey.

== Collaborations ==
She was a member of the band Cryptacize, who as of April 2009 had released two full-length albums on Asthmatic Kitty Records entitled Dig That Treasure and Mythomania.

Torrisi has performed background vocals on an album by Ariel Pink's Haunted Graffiti, entitled Before Today, Sufjan Stevens' Carrie & Lowell and Javelin, and a Devonte Hynes / Blood Orange album called Coastal Grooves. She played violin on an album by Xiu Xiu, and provided lead vocals for a song by Saturday Looks Good To Me. Torrisi sang and played keyboards in the touring lineup of The Rentals in 2014, supporting the album Lost in Alphaville. She also sang on their 2020 album, Q36.

She was a touring member of The Curtains in 2006. She has performed with Sufjan Stevens intermittently from 2009-2012 as a background singer, dancer, keyboardist, and violinist during his U.S. and world tours for The Age of Adz album, also appearing on The Tonight Show Starring Jimmy Fallon. Following this, Torrisi played in Stevens' band for a Christmas-themed tour in 2012. Cryptacize was also the opening band for Steven's U.S. tour in the fall of 2009.

Torrisi collaborated with Terrible Records solo artist Billy Uomo on several shared musical projects. Torrisi and Uomo have appeared in music videos, and produced scores for film and television.

In 2021 Torrisi self-released an EP of jazz and pop cover songs with jazz organist and pianist Larry Goldings, entitled Five Songs.

She has performed as a singer and multi-instrumentalist in Rodrigo Amarante's live band for performances and tours in 2021-2022.

Torrisi is currently writing a musical entitled, Dust Bunnies, which was selected as a 2026 semifinalist for the National Music Theater Conference at the Eugene O'Neill Theater Center.

== Discography ==
=== Albums ===
- Republic of Two (2003)
- Summerland with Thom Moore (2004)
- From the Lion's Mouth (2005)
- The Locksmith Cometh (2007)
- Dig That Treasure Released by Cryptacize (2008)
- Mythomania Released by Cryptacize (2009)
- Nedelle Torrisi (2013)
- Advice From Paradise (2015)
- Only for You (2018)
- Five Songs EP Released by Nedelle Torrisi and Larry Goldings (2021)

=== Singles ===
- Split cassingle with The Curtains (2006)
- "Friends and Ancestors" with Fred Thomas of Saturday Looks Good to Me (2005)
- "I Love Thousands Every Summer" b/w "Psychic Returns" Thin Wrist Recordings (2012)
- "Condemnation" Depeche Mode cover in collaboration with Julia Holter, Ramona Gonzalez and Cole M.G.N. Domino (2017)
