= Matthew Vollmer =

American writer and academic

- Born: May 25, 1974 (age 52); Andrews, North Carolina, U.S.
- Education: University of North Carolina at Chapel Hill (BA); North Carolina State University (MA); Iowa Writers' Workshop (MFA)
- Occupations: Writer; editor; professor
- Website: matthewvollmer.com

Matthew Vollmer (born May 25, 1974) is an American writer, editor, and professor at Virginia Tech.

== Life ==
Matthew Vollmer was born on May 25, 1974, in Andrews, North Carolina, where he was raised. He graduated with a BA in English from the University of North Carolina at Chapel Hill in 1996. He holds an MA in English from North Carolina State University, which he received in 1998, and an MFA in fiction from the Iowa Writers’ Workshop, which he received in 2006. Vollmer currently teaches at Virginia Tech as an Associate Professor of English.

== Works ==
Vollmer is the author of two collections of short fiction, Gateway to Paradise and Future Missionaries of America, as well as two collections of essays, inscriptions for headstones and Permanent Exhibit. With David Shields, he is the co-editor of Fakes: An Anthology of Pseudo Interviews, Faux-Lectures, Quasi-Letters, “Found” Texts, and Other Fraudulent Artifacts, which collects a number of stories that masquerade as other forms of writing. Vollmer is also the editor of A Book of Uncommon Prayer, a volume of everyday invocations from over 60 writers, each of whom was charged with writing–regardless of their religious inclinations–a prayer. His fifth book, This World Is Not Your Home, was published by EastOver Press in March 2022 and in 2023 Hub City Press published a book-length essay: All of Us Together in the End.

Vollmer's work has also been published widely in magazines, including Paris Review, Glimmer Train, The Sun, Virginia Quarterly Review, Epoch, Tin House, the Oxford American, Colorado Review, Gulf Coast, Ecotone, Hayden’s Ferry Review, The Antioch Review, Willow Springs, DIAGRAM, Portland Review, Tampa Review, Passages North, PANK, New England Review, The Normal School, Confrontation, Salt Hill, Fugue, PRISM International, and New Letters.

== Bibliography ==
=== Books ===
- Future Missionaries of America, MacAdam/Cage; (2009) ISBN 9781596923133, Salt Modern Fiction; (2010) ISBN 9781844714735
- Inscriptions for Headstones, Outpost 19; (2012) ISBN 9781937402372
- Gateway to Paradise, Persea Books; (2015) ISBN 9780904287370
- Permanent Exhibit, BOA Editions Ltd.; (2018) ISBN 9781942683681
- This World Is Not Your Home, EastOver Press; (2022) ISBN 9781934894729
- All of Us Together in the End, Hub City Press; (2023) ISBN 9798885740050

=== Edited works ===
- Fakes: An Anthology of Pseudo-Interview, Faux-Lectures, Quasi-Letters, “Found” Texts, and Other Fraudulent Artifacts, edited by David Shields and Matthew Vollmer, W. W. Norton; (2012) ISBN 9780393341959
- A Book of Uncommon Prayer, Outpost19; (2015) ISBN 9781933495620

== Awards and honors ==
- 2010 National Endowment for the Arts Fellowship
- 2013 Best American Essays
- 2015 Pushcart Prize
