= The Welcome Wagon =

US musical group

- Origin: Brooklyn, New York, United States
- Genres: Indie pop, Gospel
- Years active: 2001–present
- Labels: Asthmatic Kitty
- Members: Monique Aiuto; Vito Aiuto
- Website: welcometothewelcomewagon.com

The Welcome Wagon is a Gospel/indie pop band from Williamsburg, Brooklyn, New York. The group consists of Presbyterian minister Thomas Vito Aiuto and his wife, Monique. Their debut album, Welcome to the Welcome Wagon (2008), was produced by Sufjan Stevens.

== History ==
Vito Aiuto pastors Resurrection Presbyterian Church in Brooklyn, an EPC congregation which he founded in 2005, and is based at St. Paul’s Lutheran Church. Both natives of Michigan, Vito studied literature at Western Michigan University before moving on to Princeton Theological Seminary, while Monique moved to New York to study art and works as a preschool teacher.

Their first released music was on the 2001 compilation To Spirit Back the Mews. The groups's 2008 debut album, Welcome to the Welcome Wagon, featured major involvement from Sufjan Stevens, who recorded, engineered, mixed, and contributed vocals and various instruments to the album, as well as designing the artwork, and it was released on Stevens' Asthmatic Kitty label.

Second album Precious Remedies Against Satan's Devices followed in 2012.

Third album Light Up The Stairs, was released in 2017.

The group released their fourth studio album Esther, on November 4, 2022.

The group's music was described by Allmusic as a "hybrid of contemporary folk, gospel, and indie pop".

== Discography ==
=== Albums ===
- Welcome to the Welcome Wagon (2008), Asthmatic Kitty
- Precious Remedies Against Satan's Devices (2012), Asthmatic Kitty
- Light Up the Stairs (2017), Tooth and Nail
- Esther (2022), Asthmatic Kitty

=== EPs ===
- Purity of Heart Is to Will One Thing (2009), Asthmatic Kitty

=== Compilation appearances ===
- "There Is a Fountain Filled with Blood" – To Spirit Back the Mews (2001), Asthmatic Kitty
- "Sold! To the Nice Rich Man" – Mews Too: An Asthmatic Kitty Compilation (2006), Asthmatic Kitty
- "He Never Said a Mumblin' Word" – Bifrost Arts' Come O Spirit (2009), Sounds Familyre

== Live band ==
- Alex Foote – lead guitar, lap steel guitar, background vocals
- Jay Foote – bass guitar, background vocals
- Sarah Fullen Gregory – background vocals
- Evan Gregory – organ, background vocals
- Justin Keller – acoustic guitar, clarinet, flute, tenor saxophone
- Evan Mazunik – piano
- Alan Markley – piano
- Kelley McRae – background vocals
- Sufjan Stevens – banjo, piano, vocals
- Isaac Wardell – guitar, background singing
