= A Prayer for Every Hour =

Studio album by Danielson Famile
- Released: June 7, 1995
- Genre: Alternative rock/Indie rock/Gospel
- Labels: Tooth & Nail Records (original release), Secretly Canadian (2002 reissue), Fire Records (UK) (2013 reissue)
- Producer: Daniel C. Smith

Danielson Famile chronology
A Prayer for Every Hour (1995)	Tell Another Joke at the Ol' Choppin' Block (1997)

Professional ratings
Review scores
Source	Rating
AllMusic	3/5 stars
Pitchfork	6.7/10

A Prayer for Every Hour is the debut full-length album from New Jersey indie rock band Danielson Famile.

== Track listing ==
1. "Nice of Me"
2. "Feeling Tank"
3. "Ugly Tree"
4. "Like a Vacuum"
5. "Need a Beard"
6. "Pepcid 20mg"
7. "Birds"
8. "1,000 Push-Ups"
9. "God Bless"
10. "Guilt Scout"
11. "What to Wear"
12. "Do a Good Turn Daily"
13. "Burn in Hart"
14. "Hot Air"
15. "Be Your Wildman"
16. "Pray 1,995 Prayers"
17. "Headz in the Cloudz"
18. "Soul"
19. "Heimlich Remover"
20. "Naive Child"
21. "Tell Me Oh You"
22. "In the Malls Not of Them"
23. "No Foundation"
24. "Pretty"
