= Clarksboro, New Jersey =

Place in Gloucester County, New Jersey, United States

- Unincorporated community
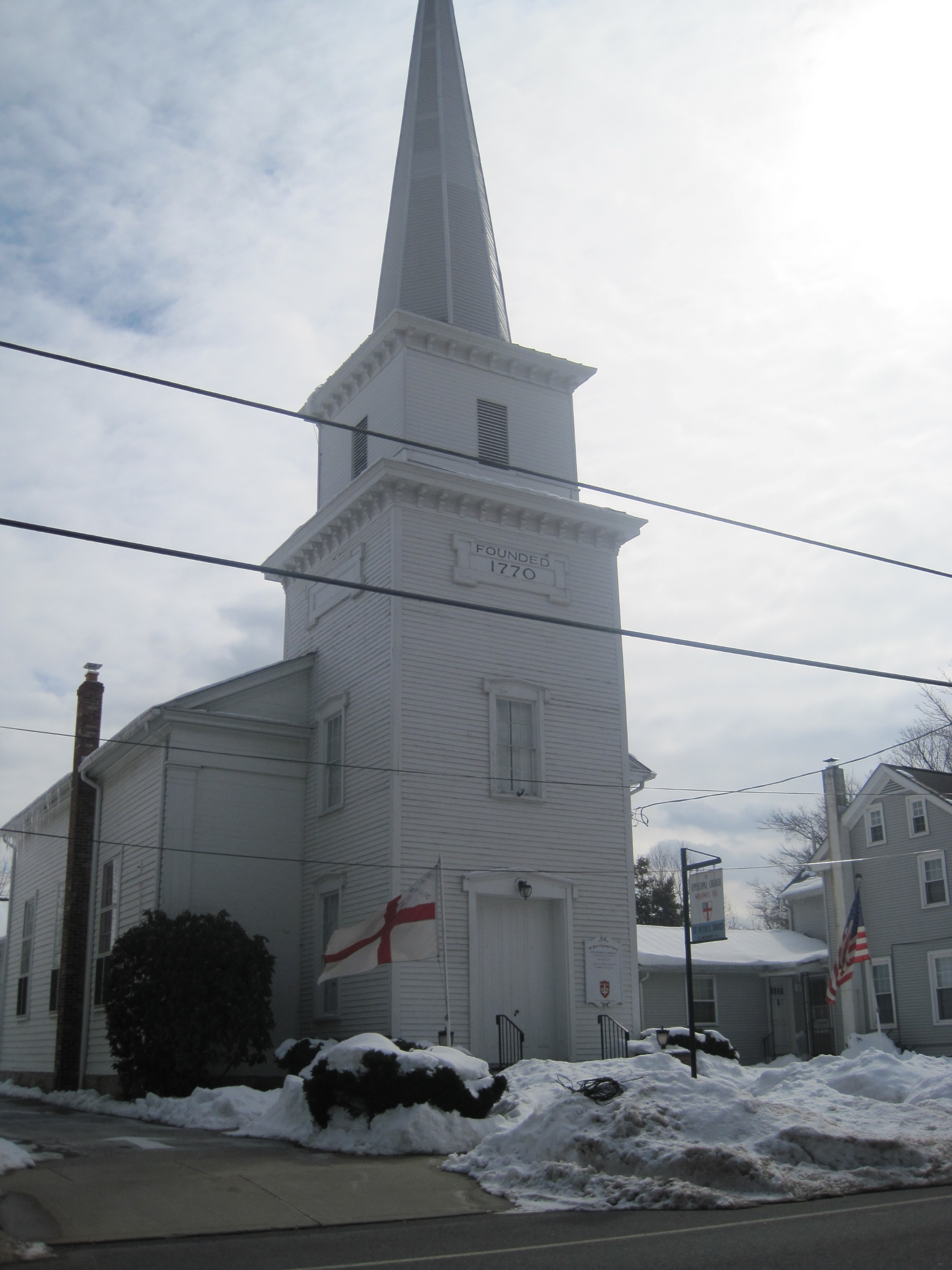
- St. Peter's Episcopal Church

- Clarksboro's location in Gloucester County (Inset: Location of Gloucester County in New Jersey) Clarksboro (New Jersey) Clarksboro (the United States)
- Coordinates: 39°47′59″N 75°13′26″W
- Country: United States
- State: New Jersey
- County: Gloucester
- Township: East Greenwich
- Elevation: 62 ft (19 m)
- ZIP code: 08020
- GNIS feature ID: 0875467

Clarksboro is an unincorporated community and historic area located in the municipality of East Greenwich Township in Gloucester County, in the U.S. state of New Jersey.

== Transportation ==
The Swedesboro Railroad built its line from Woodbury to Swedesboro through the town, opening in October 1869 under lease to the West Jersey Railroad. It is still operated for freight traffic by the Southern Railroad of New Jersey.

== Education ==
East Greenwich Township School District serves grades K-6 with students in 7-12 served by Kingsway Regional School District.

Guardian Angels Regional School is a K-8 school that operates under the auspices of the Roman Catholic Diocese of Camden. Its PreK-3 campus is in Gibbstown while its 4-8 campus is in Paulsboro.

== Notable people ==
People who were born in, residents of, or otherwise closely associated with Clarksboro include:

- Danielson (1995–present), family indie rock band
- Rachel Davis DuBois (1892–1993), educator, human rights activist and pioneer of intercultural education.
- George Gill Green (1842–1925), patent medicine manufacturer
- Amos J. Peaslee (1887–1969), politician, military official, author, and diplomat who served as United States Ambassador to Australia
- Hardy Richardson (1855-1931), Major League Baseball player

== Points of interest ==
- Eglington Cemetery
- Hollingshead Airport
