= Josh Garrels =

American singer-songwriter (born 1980)

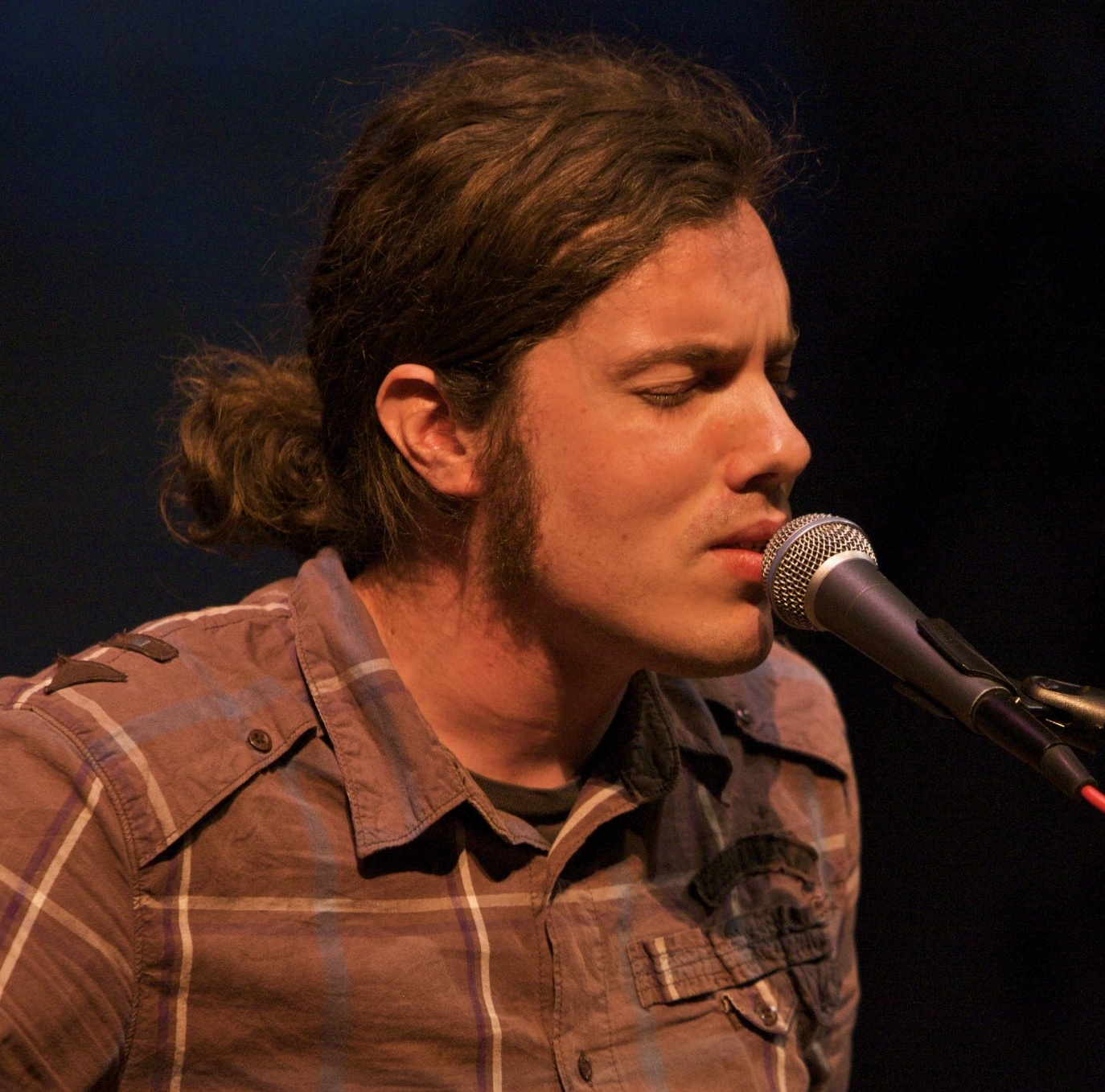
- Garrels in 2009

Background information
- Born: Joshua Michael Garrels; September 25, 1980 (age 45)
- Origin: South Bend, Indiana, U.S.
- Genres: Folk, christian music
- Years active: 2002–present
- Labels: Small Voice, Mason Jar
- Website: www.joshgarrels.com

Joshua Michael Garrels (born September 25, 1980) is an American singer-songwriter, producer, and composer from South Bend, Indiana. His music combines traditional folk music with other musical elements and the nontraditional exploration of Christian themes.

== Biography ==
Garrels is originally from South Bend, Indiana. He currently lives in Muncie, Indiana, with his wife and five children. In 2005, he co-founded Small Voice Records and released Over Oceans, Jacaranda, Lost Animals and Home. Garrels released his sixth album in June 2011 titled Love & War & The Sea in Between. Christianity Today called the album "prophetic, incisive, achingly human, and longingly spiritual", and rated it as their 2011 Album of The Year. In 2012, Garrels collaborated with the music collective Mason Jar Music to film the music-documentary movie The Sea in Between, in which Mason Jar and Garrels traveled to the remote Mayne Island to perform music on several of Mayne's most beautiful locations. "Don't Wait For Me" was featured on American Idol on January 29, 2014. He released Home on April 7, 2015.

== Charity ==
From March 14, 2013, to March 28, 2013, (14 days) Garrels had 161,245 album downloads on Noisetrade.com which raised $71,566 in "tips". All of the funds were given in full to World Relief to help with their work to bring peace and restoration to the Democratic Republic of the Congo.

== Continued work with Noisetrade ==
In the weeks leading up to the 2015 release of the album Home, Garrels gave away free copies of his previous albums on Noisetrade.com. When Home was released, listeners had a choice between buying it on ITunes or downloading it for free. Garrels gave away 42,000 copies of Home its first week.

== Discography ==
=== Studio albums ===
- Stone Tree (2002)
- Underquiet (2003)
- Over Oceans (2006)
- Jacaranda (2008)
- Lost Animals (2009)
- Love & War & The Sea in Between (2011)
- Love & War: B-Sides & Remixes (2012)
- The Sea In Between Soundtrack — with Mason Jar Music (2013)
- Home (2015) (Billboard 200 No. 83)
- The Light Came Down (2016) – Christmas album
- Chrysaline (2019)
- Peace To All Who Enter Here (2020)
- Peace To All Who Enter Here, Vol. 2 (2025)

=== Compilation albums ===
- Early Work Vol. 1 (2020)
- Early Work Vol. 2 (2021)

=== Videos ===
- The Seven Stars: Live At The Off-Center Garage (2004)
- The Sea In Between (2012)

== Notable interviews ==
- NPR (December 26, 2013)
- InterVarsity Christian Fellowship (October 17, 2013)
- Relevant (April 8, 2013)
- The Huffington Post (March 26, 2013)
