= Amos J. Peaslee =

American politician, military official and author

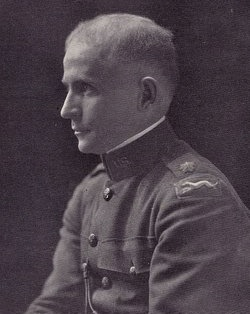

6th United States Ambassador to Australia
- In office August 12, 1953 – February 16, 1956
- President: Dwight D. Eisenhower
- Preceded by: Pete Jarman
- Succeeded by: Douglas M. Moffat

Personal details
- Born: March 24, 1887 Clarksboro, New Jersey, U.S.
- Died: August 30, 1969 (aged 82) Manhattan, New York City, U.S.
- Education: Friends' Central School; Swarthmore College; Columbia University

Military service
- Allegiance: United States
- Branch/service: United States Army; United States Navy
- Years of service: World War I World War II
- Rank: Major; Commander

Amos Jenkins Peaslee II (March 24, 1887 – August 30, 1969) was an American politician, military official, author and diplomat who served as the United States Ambassador to Australia under President of the United States Dwight D. Eisenhower.

Peaslee served as a United States Army Major in World War I and as Commander in the United States Navy during World War II. An international lawyer, he was president of the American Peace Society and played a role in writing the Charter of the United Nations.

== Early life and education ==
Peaslee was born in Clarksboro, New Jersey in 1887 to a Quaker family. A graduate of Friends' Central School (and later chair of its board), he enrolled in Swarthmore College in the fall of 1904 with the class of 1908, but ultimately moved up a year to graduate with the class of 1907. He graduated from law school at Columbia University in 1911 and was a member of the American Bar Association.

== Military service ==
Peaslee enlisted in the United States Army after graduation from law school, ultimately attaining the rank of Major. In March 1918, Army General John J. Pershing authorized Peaslee to organize the Silver Greyhounds, the first U.S. diplomatic courier service, to carry sensitive correspondence between Paris and Washington, D.C. during World War One and the U.S.-led peace efforts that followed. Peaslee retained an original copy of the Treaty of Versailles which was later donated to the U.S. Department of State archives.

During World War II, Peaslee was a Commander in the United States Navy, training coast guardsmen in sabotage prevention techniques.

== Political career ==
He became involved in national politics in 1948, working on Harold Stassen’s presidential campaign. In 1952, he played a role in Dwight Eisenhower's campaign for the presidency. Peaslee was a three-time delegate to the Republican National Convention and an active participant in Republican politics.

Peaslee was nominated by President Eisenhower and confirmed by the United States Senate to the post of U.S. Ambassador to Australia, serving from 1953 until 1956. From 1956 until 1959, he served as a Deputy Special Assistant to President Eisenhower at the White House, specializing in areas of international law. Peaslee was influential in setting U.S. policy with respect to the regulation of armaments and atomic energy, serving as the vice chairman of the U.S. delegation at the London disarmament discussion and as a U.S. advisor to the delegation to the United Nations.

Peaslee went on to compile and edit a multi-volume work entitled The Constitutions of Nations - the first full compilation of every national constitution translated into the English language.
