= Sounds Familyre Records =

Independent record label

- Founded: 1999
- Founder: Daniel Smith; Lenny Smith
- Distributor: SC Distribution
- Genre: Pop, rock, indie pop
- Country of origin: United States
- Location: Clarksboro, New Jersey
- Official website: soundsfamilyre.com

Sounds Familyre Records is an independent record label based in Clarksboro, New Jersey, started and managed by Danielson founder Daniel Smith, who created the label in 1999.

== Artists ==
- Sufjan Stevens
- Danielson
- Half-handed Cloud
- Soul-Junk
- Bifrost Arts
- Steve Taylor and the Danielson Foil
- Ortolan
- Wovenhand
- Ben + Vesper
- Leopulde
- The Singing Mechanic
- Dan Zimmerman
- I Was a King
- Jørn Åleskjær
- Octagrape

== See also ==
- Danielson
