= Danielson (band) =

American rock band

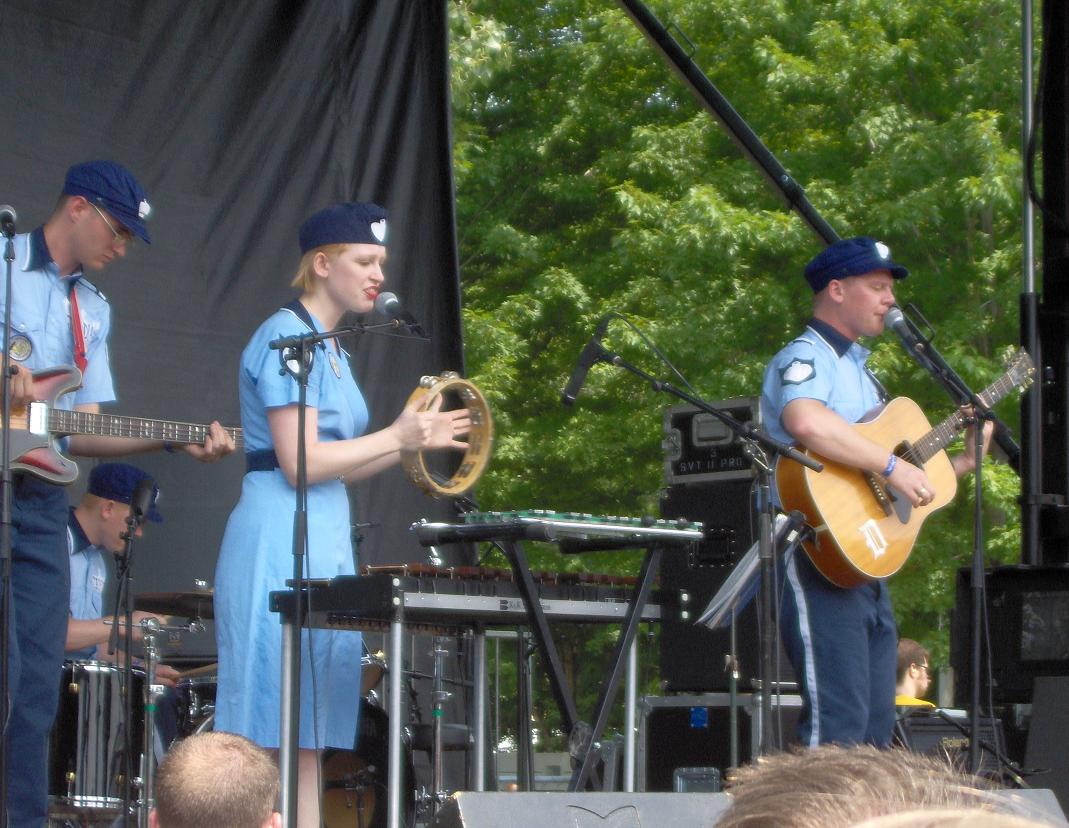
- Danielson at the 2006 Pitchfork Music Festival

Background information
- Origin: Clarksboro, New Jersey, U.S.
- Genres: Indie pop; acoustic rock; gospel
- Years active: 1994–present
- Labels: Tooth & Nail; Secretly Canadian; Sounds Familyre; Joyful Noise Recordings
- Members: Daniel Smith; Andrew Smith; David Smith; Megan Slaboda; Rachel Galloway; Elin Smith; Christiaan Palladino; Melissa Palladino; Sufjan Stevens; Lenny Smith; Lilly Smith; Ida Smith; Jedidiah Slaboda; Elyse O'Grady
- Website: soundsfamilyre.com

Danielson is an American rock band from Clarksboro, New Jersey, that plays indie pop gospel music. The group consists of frontman Daniel Smith and a number of various artists with whom he collaborates. Smith has also released solo work as Brother Danielson.

When joined by his family the band is known as Danielson Famile or Danielson Family, whose members have included Smith; his "siblings Andrew, David, Megan, and Rachel; wife Elin; friends Christiaan & Melissa Palladino; [and] daughters Lilly and Ida". Sufjan Stevens has also recorded and performed with the group.

The band is known for Smith's squeaky, falsetto vocals, innovative musical arrangements, and matching uniforms "that act, according to Daniel, as 'visual reminders of the spiritual and emotional healing taking place' within audience members." During some performances Smith has "worn a nine-foot tall, hand-made nine-fruit tree to 'bear the good fruit,'" in reference to the fruit of the Holy Spirit.

== History ==
In 1993, while attending Rutgers University as a senior, Daniel Smith experienced a spiritual reawakening:

"This was the year I stopped running away from home, picked up my acoustic guitar again and changed from being Dan back to Daniel. I woke up to the fact that I have an amazing family, an amazing childhood and I began to relate everything I was thinking and doing with this in mind... I began reading the Bible and praying again and songs and art started flowing. I would meet with my dad and talk philosophy and theology and I became a child again."

Smith has cited the major influence his musician father had on him growing up and the importance of lyrical content. Smith began recording songs that would later compose the album A Prayer for Every Hour: "some from my solo 4-track, some with my friends Jason Faunce and Missy Forsyth backing and some with my brothers and sisters backing. Danielson became the name of the songs that I write. I had become "Daniel" and realized that I am a son." He submitted the album as his final thesis (and received an 'A' grade) and performed, joined by his siblings, at the senior art show. Smith then sent the album out to several indie labels but only received a response from Tooth & Nail in California, who picked up the album and released it in 1994.

Daniel Smith, his siblings, and friend Chris Palladino began to perform in New York City, New Jersey, and Philadelphia as the "Danielson Famile." The group released Tri-Danielson!!! (Alpha) and Tri-Danielson!!! (Omega) in 1998 and 1999 respectively, earning them further college radio play and broadening their indie audience. Both LP's were recorded and produced by Kramer. The band became known for their onstage costumes (initially nurse uniforms with large red hearts sewn on) as well as their homemade T-shirts and other merchandise. While the lyrical content was unabashedly Christian, Danielson Famile nevertheless received strong press and support from secular audiences due to their musical inventiveness.

Danielson signed to Secretly Canadian Records in 2001 and released Fetch the Compass Kids, which was recorded by Steve Albini. Smith then released a solo record in 2004 (Brother Is to Son) as Brother Danielson. It was followed in May 2006 by the ambitious Ships, which featured contributions from a total of 20 musicians, including Deerhoof, Sufjan Stevens, Why?, Serena Maneesh, and Half-handed Cloud.

The band was chosen by Matt Groening to perform at the edition of the All Tomorrow's Parties festival he curated in May 2010 in Minehead, England.

In 2011, Smith released Best of Gloucester County, the first Danielson album released solely through his Sounds Familyre Records label.

In June 2014, Danielson and Jad Fair (of Half Japanese) released a collaborative album "Solid Gold Heart". The album came about as part of Jad Fair's Artist In Residence project with Indianapolis label Joyful Noise Recordings.

Daniel Smith has cited his musical influences as including "T.Rex, Rapeman, B.A.L.L., Syd Barrett, Bob Dylan, Bongwater, My Bloody Valentine, Beat Happening, Cypress Hill, Ween, Donovan, Sonic Youth, Royal Trux, Beatles, Half Japanese, A Tribe Called Quest, [David] Bowie, Can, Pixies, Minutemen, James Brown, Tom Waits, Daniel Johnston, Brian Eno, Larry Norman, Captain Beefheart and more."

In addition to Danielson's music, Smith has recorded and produced albums by Sufjan Stevens, mewithoutYou, The Welcome Wagon, The Chairman Dances, Half-handed Cloud and others.

== Discography ==
=== Studio albums ===
- A Prayer for Every Hour, Danielson, Independent, 1994
- Tell Another Joke at the Ol' Choppin' Block, Danielson Famile, Tooth and Nail, 1997
- Tri-Danielson!!! (Alpha), Danielson, Tooth and Nail, 1998
- Tri-Danielson!!! (Omega), Danielson, Tooth and Nail, 1999
- Fetch the Compass Kids, Danielson Famile, Secretly Canadian, 2001
- Brother Is to Son, Brother Danielson, Secretly Canadian, 2004
- Ships, Danielson, Secretly Canadian, 2006
- Best of Gloucester County, Danielson, Sounds Familyre Records, 2011
- Solid Gold Heart, Jad Fair & Danielson, Sounds Familyre Records, 2014

=== Compilations ===
- Trying Hartz (two-disc retrospective), Danielson, Secretly Canadian, 2008

=== EPs ===
- Insound Tour Support, Soul-Junk + Danielson, Insound, 1998
- Wow To The Deadness, Steve Taylor and the Danielson Foil, Splint Entertainment, 2016
- Snap Outtavit, Danielson, Joyful Noise, 2018

=== Singles ===
- "Flip Flop Flim Flam", Danielson Famile, Fluevog, 2001
- "The Kid" / "Five Stars and Two Thumbs Up", Brother Danielson, Secretly Canadian, 2003
- "When It Comes To You I'm Lazy" / "Goody, Goody", Danielson Kill Rock Stars, 2006
- "I'm Slow But I'm Sloppy" / "Did I Step On Your Remix", Danielson, Anticon Records, 2006
- "Dry Goods Dry Power" / "Left-Handed Smoke Shifter", Danielson, Sounds Familyre, 2006
- "Our Givest (Odd Nosdam Remix)" / "Jokin' At the Block (Dymaxion Remix)", Danielson, Secretly Canadian, 2008
- "Moment Soakers" / "Eagle", Danielson, Sounds Familyre, 2009
- "Grow Up" / "Wheel in the Sky" (Journey cover), Danielson, Fire, 2011
- "Expectorance", Danielson, Joyful Noise Recordings, 2012
- "The True Wheel", (Brian Eno cover) Danielson, Joyful Noise Recordings, 2018
- "Visions of the Sugar Plum Fairy”, Danielson, Joyful Noise Recordings, 2020

=== DVDs ===
- Tooth & Nail Videography – 1993–99, Tooth & Nail Records, 2000
- Why Should the Devil Have All the Good Music, Blank Stare, 2006
- Danielson: A Family Movie (or, Make A Joyful Noise HERE), Homevision, 2007

=== Compilation appearances ===
- "Song for Every Speaker" – Art Core Volume 2, Tooth & Nail, 1996
- "Smooth Death" – Tooth & Nail Rock Sampler, Volume 1, Tooth & Nail, 1997
- "Allhallow's Eve" – The Unaccompanied Voice: An A Capella Compilation, Secretly Canadian, 2000
- "Who are Parents?" – Better Than the Beatles: A Tribute to the Shaggs, Animal World, 2001
- "Nothing to Do" – Dimension Mix: A Tribute to Bruce Haack, Eenie Meenie, 2005
- "My Lion Sleeps Tonight" – Mews Too: An Asthmatic Kitty Compilation, Asthmatic Kitty, 2006
- "Worried Shoes" – I Killed the Monster: 21 Artists Performing the Songs of Daniel Johnston, Second Shimmy, 2006
- "Happy Days Are Here Again" – Song of America, Split Rock Records / Thirty One Tigers, 2007

=== Soundtracks ===
- Electric Jesus (Music From And Inspired By The Motion Picture, Various Artists), Joyful Noise, 2021
