= Carrie & Lowell Tour =

2015–16 concert tour by Sufjan Stevens

- Tour by Sufjan Stevens
- Promotional poster for the tour
- Associated album: Carrie & Lowell
- Start date: April 10, 2015
- End date: March 8, 2016
- Legs: 5
- No. of shows: 59 in North America; 15 in Australasia; 28 in Europe; 102 total

Sufjan Stevens concert chronology
- Surfjohn Stevens Christmas Sing-A-Long (2012); Carrie & Lowell Tour (2015–16); ...

The Carrie & Lowell Tour was the sixth concert tour by American recording artist Sufjan Stevens. The tour supported his seventh studio album, Carrie & Lowell (2015). The tour began in the spring of 2015. Stevens played over 100 shows in North America, Australasia and Europe.

== Background ==
The tour was announced in January 2015, with tickets going on sale January 30, 2015. In April, shows in the Europe were announced. Following his festival appearance in Sydney, Stevens mentioned wanting to do a full tour in Australia. The dates were released in September 2015.

== Critical reception ==
The tour was well received by concertgoers and critics. Piet Levy of the Milwaukee Journal Sentinel wrote: "But the approach was absolutely appropriate for what is clearly a deeply personal body of work, one whose sentiments of abandonment and regret and nostalgia resemble what audience members have experienced during their own complicated lives". The Atlantic's Spencer Kornhaber praised the concert in Washington, D.C.. He wrote: "Seeing Stevens live is like upping the contrast in a photo. Carrie & Lowell sounds much the same throughout—it's mostly acoustic, mostly percussion-free, and definitely not a jam—but in concert there are higher highs and lower lows and a wider array of sounds". The concert in Pittsburgh was attended by Scott Mervis of the Pittsburgh Post-Gazette. He stated: "Between the acoustics of Heinz Hall, a microphone he must have spent a fortune on, exquisite melodies and a voice that glides so beautifully from whisper to falsetto, it was a stunning effect. With multi-instrumentalists Casey Foubert, Dawn Landes, 'Zardok' and drummer James McAlister, it was five-person symphony blending delicate strings with moody electronics, percussion and choral vocals that built to sneaky crescendos that don't appear on the record".

In the United Kingdom, the shows received glowing reviews, all getting five out of five stars. For the Dublin concert, Siobhán Kane of The Irish Times stated: "Atmosphere is something Stevens brings to The Helix, a sympathetic space for his show, lending itself well to his invitation to church; at one point mirrorballs and clever lighting suggests stained glass windows which, along with the confiding nature of the performance, provide a genuinely transcendental experience. Something the haunting Vesuvius, with a semblance of choreography, harnesses". During the Edinburgh festival, Charlotte Runcie of The Daily Telegraph wrote: "It was a soothing and nourishing coda after the eardrum-bursting swoops earlier in the night. From sublime to fragile, sombre to beautiful, and universal to intimate, this was an exhilarating concert of perfect balance, with Stevens the best he has ever been". For the London show, David Smyth from the London Evening Standard wrote: "Stevens is always capable of making beautiful, emotional acoustic music but prone to eccentric projects such as collections about Christmas or a Brooklyn freeway — and the still, quiet anguish of his new material is devastating. During the main body of the performance he did not speak between songs. The repeated refrain of 'Fourth of July' — 'We're all gonna die' — could not have been clearer".

== Opening acts ==
- Cold Specks (North America—Leg 1, select dates)
- Little Scream (North America—Leg 1, select dates)
- Moses Sumney (North America—Leg 1, select dates)
- Helado Negro (North America—Leg 1, select dates)
- Gallant (North America—Leg 2)
- Madisen Ward and the Mama Bear (Europe, select dates)
- Mina Tindle (Europe, select dates)
- Basia Bulat (Europe, select dates)
- Austra (Europe, select dates)
- Naomi Shelton & the Gospel Queens (New York City, May 1)
- Dawn Landes (Dallas)*

*Landes also performed as part of Stevens's backing band.

== Example Setlist ==
The following setlist was obtained from the June 3, 2015 concert, held at the Dorothy Chandler Pavilion in Los Angeles, California. It does not represent all concerts for the duration of the tour.

1. "Redford (For Yia-Yia & Pappou)"
2. "Death with Dignity"
3. "Should Have Known Better"
4. "Drawn to the Blood"
5. "All of Me Wants All of You"
6. "Eugene"
7. "John My Beloved"
8. "The Only Thing"
9. "Fourth of July"
10. "No Shade in the Shadow of the Cross"
11. "Carrie & Lowell"
12. "The Owl and the Tanager"
13. "In the Devil's Territory"
14. "The Dress Looks Nice on You"
15. "To Be Alone with You"
16. "Futile Devices"
17. "Casimir Pulaski Day"
18. "Blue Bucket of Gold"

Encore

1. "Concerning the UFO Sighting near Highland, Illinois"
2. "The Predatory Wasp of the Palisades Is Out to Get Us!"
3. "Chicago"

== Tour dates ==
Date	City	Country	Venue
North America
April 9, 2015	Philadelphia	United States	Academy of Music
April 10, 2015	Philadelphia	United States	Academy of Music
April 11, 2015	New York City	United States	Beacon Theatre
April 12, 2015	Hartford	United States	Mortensen Hall
April 14, 2015	Portland	United States	Merrill Auditorium
April 15, 2015	Albany	United States	Palace Theatre
April 16, 2015	Cleveland	United States	Masonic Auditorium
April 17, 2015	Columbus	United States	Palace Theatre
April 18, 2015	Indianapolis	United States	Murat Theatre
April 20, 2015	St. Louis	United States	Peabody Opera House
April 21, 2015	Kansas City	United States	Arvest Bank Theatre
April 22, 2015	Minneapolis	United States	Northrop Auditorium
April 23, 2015	Milwaukee	United States	Riverside Theater
April 24, 2015	Chicago	United States	Chicago Theatre
April 25, 2015	Chicago	United States	Chicago Theatre
April 27, 2015	Detroit	United States	Masonic Theater
April 28, 2015	Grand Rapids	United States	CFAC Auditorium
April 29, 2015	Toronto	Canada	Massey Hall
April 30, 2015	Montreal	Canada	Salle Wilfrid-Pelletier
May 1, 2015	New York City	United States	Kings Theatre
May 2, 2015	New York City	United States	Kings Theatre
May 4, 2015	Boston	United States	Wang Theatre
May 5, 2015	Washington, D.C.	United States	DAR Constitution Hall
May 6, 2015	Richmond	United States	Altria Theater
May 7, 2015	Durham	United States	Durham Performing Arts Center
May 9, 2015	New Orleans	United States	Saenger Theatre
May 10, 2015	Dallas	United States	Majestic Theatre
May 11, 2015	Houston	United States	Jones Hall
May 12, 2015	Austin	United States	Bass Concert Hall
May 13, 2015	Austin	United States	Bass Concert Hall
Australasia
May 22, 2015^{[A]}	Sydney	Australia	Sydney Opera House
May 23, 2015^{[A]}	Sydney	Australia	Sydney Opera House
May 24, 2015^{[A]}	Sydney	Australia	Sydney Opera House
May 25, 2015^{[A]}	Sydney	Australia	Sydney Opera House
North America
June 2, 2015	San Diego	United States	Copley Symphony Hall
June 3, 2015	Los Angeles	United States	Dorothy Chandler Pavilion
June 4, 2015	Los Angeles	United States	Dorothy Chandler Pavilion
June 5, 2015	Oakland	United States	Fox Oakland Theatre
June 7, 2015	Oakland	United States	Fox Oakland Theatre
June 8, 2015	Portland	United States	Arlene Schnitzer Concert Hall
June 9, 2015	Vancouver	Canada	Orpheum Theatre
June 10, 2015	Seattle	United States	Paramount Theatre
June 11, 2015	Seattle	United States	Paramount Theatre
July 18, 2015^{[B]}	Eau Claire	United States	Foster Farms
July 25, 2015^{[C]}	Newport	United States	Fort Adams State Park
August 14, 2015^{[D]}	Lyons	United States	Planet Bluegrass Ranch
Europe
August 28, 2015	Dublin	Ireland	Mahony Hall
August 29, 2015	Dublin	Ireland	Mahony Hall
August 30, 2015^{[E]}	Edinburgh	Scotland	Edinburgh Playhouse
August 31, 2015	Manchester	England	O_{2} Apollo
September 2, 2015	London	England	Royal Festival Hall
September 3, 2015	London	England	Royal Festival Hall
September 4, 2015	Brighton	England	Brighton Dome Concert Hall
September 5, 2015^{[F]}	Tollard Royal	England	Larmer Tree Gardens
September 6, 2015	Bristol	England	Colston Hall
September 8, 2015	Paris	France	Grand Rex
September 9, 2015	Paris	France	Grand Rex
September 10, 2015	Brussels	Belgium	Salle Le Bœuf
September 12, 2015	Oslo	Norway	Oslo Spektrum
September 13, 2015	Stockholm	Sweden	Göta Lejon
September 14, 2015	Copenhagen	Denmark	Falkoner Salen
September 15, 2015	Hamburg	Germany	Mehr!-Theater am Großmarkt
September 16, 2015	Berlin	Germany	Admiralspalast
September 17, 2015	Berlin	Germany	Admiralspalast
September 19, 2015	Essen	Germany	Colosseum Theater
September 20, 2015	Versoix	Switzerland	Théâtre du Léman
September 21, 2015	Milan	Italy	Teatro della Luna
September 23, 2015	Amsterdam	Netherlands	Royal Theatre Carré
September 24, 2015	Amsterdam	Netherlands	Royal Theatre Carré
September 25, 2015	Reims	France	Comédie de Reims
September 26, 2015	Luxembourg City	Luxembourg	Grand Théâtre de Luxembourg
September 27, 2015	Caluire-et-Cuire	France	Salle Radiant
September 29, 2015	Barcelona	Spain	Auditori Fòrum
September 30, 2015	Madrid	Spain	Teatro Circo Price
North America
October 24, 2015	Santa Barbara	United States	Arlington Theater
October 25, 2015	Phoenix	United States	Orpheum Theatre
October 26, 2015	Albuquerque	United States	Popejoy Hall
October 27, 2015	Denver	United States	Paramount Theatre
October 28, 2015	Omaha	United States	Orpheum Theatre
October 30, 2015	Buffalo	United States	Mainstage Theatre
October 31, 2015	Jersey City	United States	Loew's Jersey Theatre
November 1, 2015	Baltimore	United States	Meyerhoff Symphony Hall
November 3, 2015	Pittsburgh	United States	Heinz Hall for the Performing Arts
November 4, 2015	Charlotte	United States	Ovens Auditorium
November 5, 2015	Atlanta	United States	Cobb Energy Performing Arts Centre
November 6, 2015	Orlando	United States	Walt Disney Theater
November 7, 2015	Miami	United States	Olympia Theater
November 9, 2015	North Charleston	United States	North Charleston Performing Arts Center
November 10, 2015	Birmingham	United States	Alabama Theatre
November 11, 2015	Nashville	United States	Ryman Auditorium
November 12, 2015	Louisville	United States	Whitney Hall
November 13, 2015	Cincinnati	United States	Procter & Gamble Hall
Australasia
February 22, 2016	Sydney	Australia	State Theatre
February 25, 2016	Canberra	Australia	Canberra Theatre
February 26, 2016	Melbourne	Australia	Hamer Hall
February 27, 2016	Melbourne	Australia	Hamer Hall
February 28, 2016	Melbourne	Australia	Hamer Hall
February 29, 2016	Adelaide	Australia	Thebarton Theatre
March 2, 2016	Perth	Australia	Red Hill Auditorium
March 4, 2016	Brisbane	Australia	QPAC Concert Hall
March 6, 2016^{[G]}	Wellington	New Zealand	Michael Fowler Centre
March 7, 2016^{[G]}	Wellington	New Zealand	Michael Fowler Centre
March 8, 2016^{[H]}	Auckland	New Zealand	Auckland Civic Theatre

Festivals and other miscellaneous performances

^{A} Vivid Live
^{B} Eaux Claires Music & Arts Festival
^{C} Newport Folk Festival
^{D} Rocky Mountain Folks Festival
^{E} Edinburgh International Festival
^{F} End of the Road Festival
^{G} New Zealand Festival
^{H} Auckland Art Festival

=== Box office score data ===
Venue	City	Tickets sold / Available	Gross revenue
Beacon Theatre	New York City	2,693 / 2,803 (96%)	$121,185
Palace Theatre	Columbus	2,459 / 2,459 (100%)	$97,334
Northrop Auditorium	Minneapolis	2,509 / 2,509 (100%)	$91,579
Chicago Theatre	Chicago	6,931 / 6,931 (100%)	$218,327
Masonic Theater	Detroit	3,041 / 3,500 (87%)	$120,296
Kings Theatre	New York City	5,946 / 6,163 (96%)	$267,570
Wang Theatre	Boston	3,363 / 3,514 (96%)	$134,198
Altria Theater	Richmond	2,283 / 3,610 (63%)	$81,549
Durham Performing Arts Center	Durham	2,622 / 2,712 (97%)	$95,275
Jones Hall	Houston	2,368 / 2,817 (84%)	$89,968
Bass Concert Hall	Austin	5,065 / 5,582 (91%)	$193,295
Fox Oakland Theatre	Oakland	3,891 / 3,891 (100%)	$175,095
Arlington Theater	Santa Barbara	1,883 / 1,883 (100%)	$95,124
Orpheum Theatre	Omaha	1,400 / 2,097(67%)	$59,920
Ovens Auditorium	Charlotte	1,421 / 2,327 (61%)	$53,677
Olympia Theater	Miami	1,315 / 1,591 (83%)	$56,933
Alabama Theatre	Birmingham	1,580 / 2,164 (73%)	$61,775
TOTAL		50,770 / 56,553 (90%)	$2,013,100

== Personnel ==
- Production & Lighting Designer: Marc Janowitz
- Content Designer: Josh Higgason
- Lighting Director: Jason Rothberg

Band

- Guitar: Dawn Landes
- Bass guitar: Casey Foubert
- Drums: James McAlister
- Keyboards: Steve Moore
