= Chopped and Scrooged =

Mixtape by Sufjan Stevens
- Released: December 11, 2012
- Genre: Hip hop
- Length: 33:34
- Label: Asthmatic Kitty

Sufjan Stevens chronology
Silver & Gold (2012)	Chopped and Scrooged (2012)	Carrie & Lowell (2015)

Chopped and Scrooged is a Christmas themed hip hop mixtape by musician Sufjan Stevens. The mixtape was released on December 11, 2012. The mixtape was released for free.

== Track listing ==
Chopped and Scrooged track listing
No.	Title	Artist	Length
1.	"The Child with the Star on His Head"	Heems	4:14
2.	"Dream Catcher"	The Pro Letarians	4:43
3.	"Cool Like Jack"	Mr. Kinetik and Tony Styxx	3:02
4.	"Black Christmas"	Charles (Book & Record)	3:51
5.	"Ding-a-ling-a-ring-a-ling"	Busdriver	4:02
6.	"Xmas In The Room"	Nicky da B	4:02
7.	"Implants & Yankee Candles"	Kitty	3:13
8.	"Blue Baktun"	Electric iLL	3:46
9.	"Xmas Woes"	David "Moose" Adamson and Oreo Jones	2:41
Total length:			33:34
