= The Age of Adz =

Studio album by Sufjan Stevens
- Released: October 12, 2010
- Recorded: 2009–2010
- Genres: Electronica; electropop; synth-pop; art pop; folktronica; electroacoustic
- Length: 74:49
- Label: Asthmatic Kitty
- Producer: Sufjan Stevens

Sufjan Stevens chronology
All Delighted People (2010)	The Age of Adz (2010)	Silver & Gold (2012)

Sufjan Stevens studio album chronology
Illinois (2005)	The Age of Adz (2010)	Carrie & Lowell (2015)

Singles from The Age of Adz
- 1. "I Walked" Released: August 27, 2010; 2. "Too Much" Released: September 9, 2010

The Age of Adz (/ɑːdz/ AHDZ) is the sixth studio album by American singer-songwriter Sufjan Stevens, released on October 12, 2010, by Asthmatic Kitty. It was Stevens' first song-based full-length album in five years, since the release of Illinois in 2005.

The album features heavy use of electronics augmented by orchestration and takes inspiration from the apocalyptic artwork of schizophrenic artist Royal Robertson. Stevens' use of electronics marked a radical departure from much of his previous work—most notably from Seven Swans and Michigan. Stevens had previously explored electronics on his album Enjoy Your Rabbit. Unlike Illinois, the lyrics do not explore events, characters or setting, but deal instead with themes and emotions on a personal level.

Critics praised the intimacy of the album, but many were divided over the change in style that Stevens had taken. Nonetheless, it appeared on several "best of 2010" lists, including those of Paste, The New York Times and MTV. Commercially, the album gave Stevens his career's best first-week sales to date and was his highest-charting album to date, peaking at number seven on the Billboard 200.

== Background and recording ==
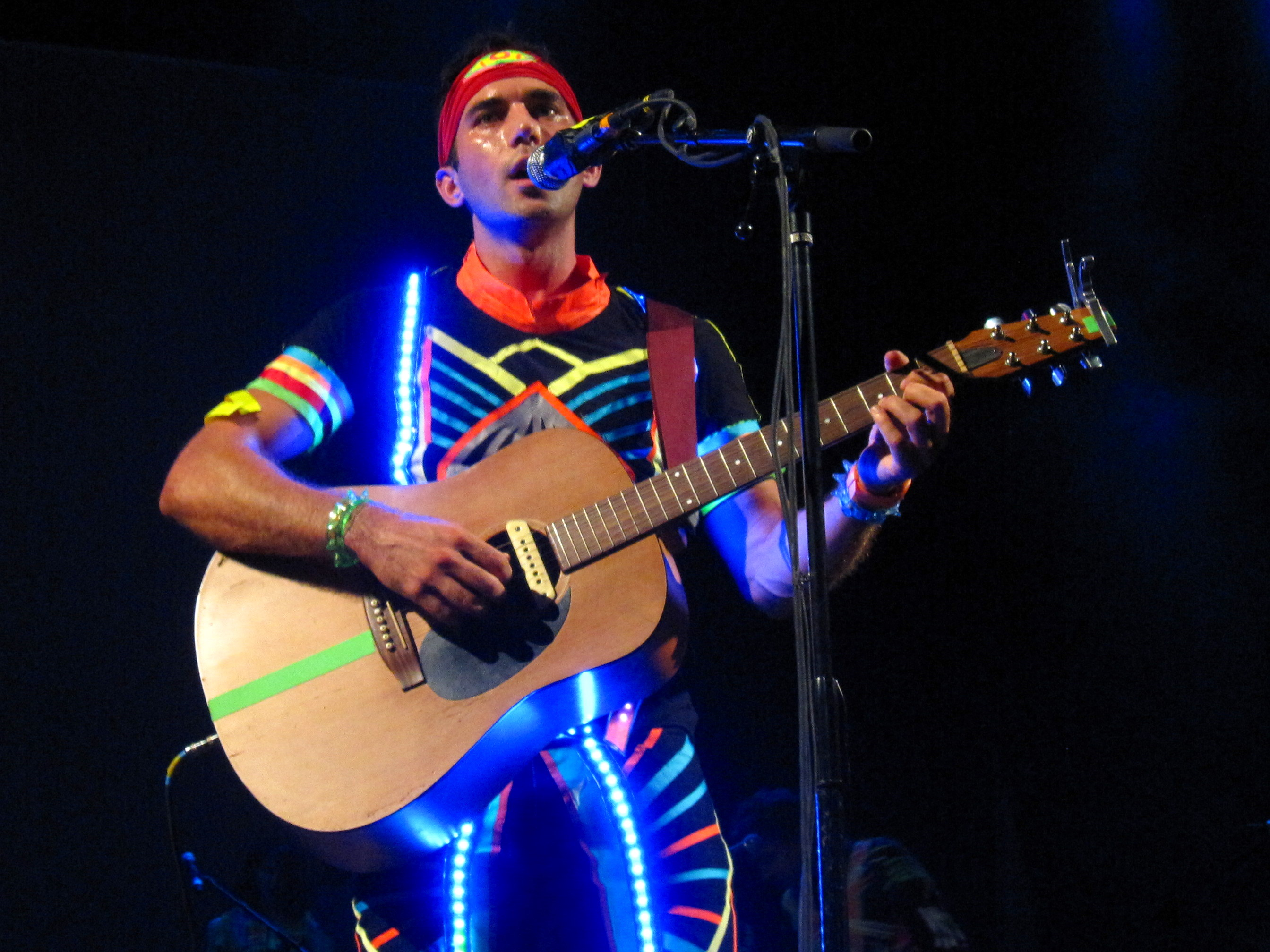
Stevens' musical interests shifted dramatically after Illinois—he is seen here in 2011 wearing a colorful light-up outfit that fits the obscure electronic themes of The Age of Adz

In 2006, Sufjan Stevens released an album of extra material left over from Illinois (originally conceived as a double album), titled The Avalanche, as well as an album of Christmas music titled Songs for Christmas (produced in parts between 2001 and 2006). Following the release of The Avalanche, Stevens expressed a dissatisfaction with his music, stating in an interview with Pitchfork in 2006: "I'm getting tired of my voice. I'm getting tired of ... the banjo. I'm getting tired of ... the trumpet". In 2009 Stevens admitted that his Fifty States Project—an attempt to write an album for each of the 50 U.S. States—had been a "promotional gimmick" and not something that he had seriously intended to complete. In the same year he released The BQE, an orchestral suite accompanying a home-made film dedicated to the Brooklyn-Queens Expressway. In an interview with BeatRoute magazine in 2010, Stevens stated "[The BQE] kinda sabotaged the mechanical way of approaching my music, which was basically narrative long-form. It really opened things up for me. It also confused things as well. I don’t think I ever really fully recovered from that process". On August 20, 2010, without prior announcement, Stevens released the EP All Delighted People, and less than one week later, announced The Age of Adz to be released on October 12.

In interviews, Stevens stated that during 2009–2010 he suffered from a mysterious debilitating viral infection that affected his nervous system. He experienced chronic pain, and was forced to stop working on music for several months. He said: "The Age of Adz, is, in some ways, a result of that process of working through health issues and getting much more in touch with my physical self. That's why I think the record's really obsessed with sensation and has a hysterical melodrama to it."

My Brightest Diamond frontwoman Shara Nova—who previously collaborated with Stevens as a backing vocalist on the albums The Avalanche and Illinois—has a solo performance on the track "Impossible Soul", and provides backing vocals throughout the album.

=== Artwork ===
The artwork of Royal Robertson, a self-proclaimed prophet from Louisiana, was used for the album's cover and interior. Will Hermes of Rolling Stone said that Sufjan Stevens uses the artwork "as a springboard for music that evokes a visionary psyche." Stevens became interested in the work of Robertson after recording music for a friend's documentary on the artist and said that "[the more I studied him and his work], the more I felt a weird affinity to this guy and the story of his life." He began to transcribe some of the text that appears in Robertson's artwork, and says this process stayed with him a "long time" and "that some of it started to come up in the lyrics, in the songs I was writing.

== Musical style and themes ==
=== Musical style ===
"Age of Adz" (2010)
30 second sample from the song "Age of Adz", demonstrating the use of heavy electronic and orchestral sounds.

The Age of Adz marked a radical departure in musical style from that of Stevens' previous album Illinois. Robin Hilton summarised the changes as Stevens "[replacing] delicately plucked banjo lines, wispy vocals and sentimental melodies with glitchy soundscapes, hip-hop beats and heavily filtered vocals." Amongst his other work, the 2001 electronic album Enjoy Your Rabbit was regarded as being the most close in style to this album. Nevertheless, critics highlighted the first track "Futile Devices" as being stylistically consistent with his earlier acoustic work.

Described by critics as an electronica, electropop, synthpop art pop electro-folk, and electro-acoustic, album, it also features elements of art rock indie pop, and glitchy production. Sufjan Stevens himself has said that the album's tracks "are pop songs, but they’re based on sound experimentation and noise". He contrasted the way in which the album was made for listeners who understood his interest in "electronic music and noise and in sound sculpting and minimalism", and with Illinois which he described as a "populist record".

=== Themes ===
The Age of Adz departs from the geography-based concepts of Stevens' previous albums; until his announcement in 2009 that he had never seriously intended to complete the project, it had been expected that his next work might continue the Fifty States Project that he had begun with Michigan and continued with Illinois. The album contains no "conceptual underpinnings", instead focusing on themes that are personal and intimate to Stevens himself; the label Asthmatic Kitty describes the themes as "personal and primal … love, sex, death, disease, illness, anxiety, and suicide".

A recurrent focus of the album is love, a theme that sometimes overlaps with spirituality as Stevens seems to address both a lover and a divine power. Another important theme is that of mortality — the song "Now That I'm Older" has been noted as "repeatedly [acknowledging] mortality and the importance of making the most of life." Acknowledging the interplay of these two themes, the album has been described as having songs "in which love and death reign darkly over an imaginative landscape peopled with apparitions, ghosts, orators and space travellers".

== Release and reception ==
The Age of Adz debuted at number seven on the Billboard 200, with 36,000 copies sold, giving Stevens his career's best first week sales to date until Carrie & Lowell opened with 51,000 copies in 2015. It was his highest-charting album to date, peaking in the top ten on the Billboard 200. It also placed number one on Billboard's "Rock Albums", "Independent Albums", "Alternative Albums" and "Folk Albums" lists, and placed number two on the "Digital Albums" and "Tastemaker Albums" lists. The album also placed within the "Top 100 Albums" lists in several other countries.

=== Critical reception ===
Professional ratings
Aggregate scores
Source	Rating
AnyDecentMusic?	7.5/10
Metacritic	80/100
Review scores
Source	Rating
AllMusic	4/5 stars
The A.V. Club	B
Entertainment Weekly	A−
The Guardian	4/5 stars
The Independent	4/5 stars
Los Angeles Times	3.5/4 stars
NME	7/10
Pitchfork	8.4/10
Rolling Stone	3.5/5 stars
Spin	7/10

The Age of Adz received positive reviews upon its release. At Metacritic, which assigns a normalised rating out of 100 to reviews from mainstream critics, the album received an average score of 80, based on 33 reviews, indicating "generally favorable reviews". Keith Meatto of the Frontier Psychiatrist described the album as "a musical masterpiece that blends analog and digital sounds as it reflects on love and loss, life and death, humanity and divinity". Entertainment.ie's Jenny Mulligan described Stevens as "a strange one, that's for sure, but he may just be a genius". Uncut commented that the album provides plenty of evidence to argue that he is either "one of the most important songwriters of his generation" or "just an infuriating, neurotic show-off". Alexis Petridis of The Guardian said that although the album "goes a bit barmy and over-the-top" there are some "incredible tune[s]" that are "not only genuinely remarkable, but genuinely enjoyable". Alex Denney of NME similarly commented that the album "conjures just enough moments of heart-stopping gorgeousness to foot the bill for its dizzying excesses". Sam Lewis of the BBC remarked on the same point: that the album is "suffused with individual moments of brilliance", but overall it is "let down by its self-conscious incoherence".

The most discussed track of the album among reviewers was "Impossible Soul", which at 25 minutes in length comprises a third of the overall album. Pitchfork's reviewer Ryan Dombal described the track as having "more engaging ideas than most artists could muster in a career", although No Ripcord reviewer Alan Shulman criticized the middle sections as being an "epic train wreck", saying that the closing minutes come as "a breath of fresh air". One Thirty BPM reviewer Rob Hakimian was mixed in his reception of the track, and commented that it would "make or break" the album for listeners, describing it as a successful "proclamation of love", but also "bloated" and "way over the top".

=== Accolades ===
Many reviewing sites included The Age of Adz in their best of 2010 lists.

Best of the year (2010) lists
Publisher	Accolade	Rank
Time	Top 10 Albums of 2010	No. 6
Exclaim!	Best Pop & Rock Album of 2010	No. 8
Pitchfork	50 top albums of 2010	No. 25
The New York Times	Top Pop 2010 Anthems	No. 5
MTV	20 Best Albums Of 2010	No. 10
Paste	The 50 Best Albums of 2010	No. 9

== Track listing ==
All tracks are written by Sufjan Stevens.

No.	Title	Length
1.	"Futile Devices"	2:11
2.	"Too Much"	6:44
3.	"Age of Adz"	8:00
4.	"I Walked"	5:01
5.	"Now That I'm Older"	4:56
6.	"Get Real Get Right"	5:10
7.	"Bad Communication"	2:24
8.	"Vesuvius"	5:26
9.	"All for Myself"	2:55
10.	"I Want to Be Well"	6:27
11.	"Impossible Soul": "Part 1"; "Part 2"; "Part 3"; "Part 4"; "Part 5"	25:35: 3:56; 5:59; 3:54; 8:33; 3:13
Total length:		74:49

- Part 5 of "Impossible Soul" is referred to by Stevens as "Pleasure Principle". It was moved to the end of side C on the vinyl release, just after "I Want to Be Well", for reasons of space and time restrictions.

== Personnel ==
The album's liner notes provides limited information regarding the personnel. Prophet Royal Robertson is credited with all artwork. With images such as the pieces "Bar-Koom!", "Katora", and "Space Autos" by Scott Ogden. Shara Nova performs a solo on "Impossible Soul", and provides backing vocals throughout. St. Vincent sang backing vocals on "Now That I'm Older".

== Remixes ==
The song "Vesuvius" was sampled in "Fade Away" by Social Club and Khleo Thomas, as well as in "Donald Trump" by Mac Miller. "All for Myself" was sampled in Asaiah Ziv and Kiya Lacey's "Babylon[ER]" and Kendrick Lamar's "Hood Politics". The song "Futile Devices" was remixed by Doveman – who produced Carrie & Lowell, Sufjan's seventh studio album – for the 2017 film Call Me by Your Name.

== Charts ==
=== Weekly charts ===
Weekly chart performance for The Age of Adz
Chart (2010)	Peak position
Australian Albums (ARIA)	61
Belgian Albums (Ultratop Flanders)	25
Dutch Albums (Album Top 100)	75
French Albums (SNEP)	52
German Albums (Offizielle Top 100)	73
Irish Albums (IRMA)	23
Norwegian Albums (VG-lista)	19
Scottish Albums (Official Charts)	35
Swiss Albums (Schweizer Hitparade)	48
UK Albums Chart	30
UK Independent Albums (Official Charts)	4
US Billboard 200	7
US Americana/Folk Albums (Billboard)	1
US Top Alternative Albums (Billboard)	1
US Independent Albums (Billboard)	1
US Top Rock Albums (Billboard)	1

=== Year-end charts ===
Year-end chart performance for The Age of Adz
Chart (2010)	Peak position
US Americana/Folk Albums (Billboard)	8
US Independent Albums (Billboard)	44
Chart (2011)	Peak position
US Americana/Folk Albums (Billboard)	15
