= Judith Scott (artist) =

American fiber sculptor

- Judith Scott, c. 1998 photograph by Leon Borensztein
- Born: 1 May 1943; Cincinnati, Ohio, US
- Died: 15 March 2005 (aged 61); Dutch Flat, California, US
- Movement: Fiber art Outsider art

Judith Scott (May 1, 1943 – March 15, 2005) was an American fiber sculptor. She was deaf and had Down Syndrome. She was internationally renowned for her art. In 1987, Judith was enrolled at the Creative Growth Art Center in Oakland, California, which supports people with developmental disabilities. There, Judith discovered her passion and talent for abstract fiber art, and she was able to communicate in a new form. An account of Scott's life, Entwined: Sisters and Secrets in the Silent World of Artist Judith Scott, was written by her twin sister, Joyce Wallace Scott, and was published in 2016.

== Biography ==
Judith was born into a middle-class family in Cincinnati, Ohio on May 1, 1943, along with her fraternal twin sister Joyce. Unlike Joyce, Judith was born with Down Syndrome. During her infancy, Judith had scarlet fever, which caused her to lose her hearing. As this remained unknown until much later on in her life, Judith was never taught to sign, lipread or speak as a child.

Judith Scott spent her first seven and a half years at home with her parents, twin sister and older brothers. Although the developmental gap between the two girls was apparent, "the parents consciously sought to treat these youngest members of the family alike."

However, when it was time for the girls to start attending school, Judith was found to be "ineducable." There was only one classroom for children with disabilities, and Judith was not able to pass the verbally-based entrance tests, due to her still undiagnosed deafness. Consequently, on medical advice, her parents placed Judith in the Columbus State Institution (formerly the Columbus State School), an institution for mentally disabled people, on October 18, 1950. This separation had a profound effect on both twins.

The records from Judith Scott's first few years at the Institution indicate that she had an IQ of 30 (based upon oral testing before her deafness was recognized). For this reason she was denied any training opportunities. Deprived of her twin, Judith became severely alienated, and behavioral problems soon surfaced. Her Clinical Record states that "She does not seem to be in good contact with her environment. She does not get along well with other children, is restless, eats messily, tears her clothing, and beats other children. Her presence on the ward is a disturbing influence." Soon after, she was moved to a smaller state institution at Gallipolis, Ohio.

In 1985, after 35 years of complete separation and lengthy and difficult negotiations, Joyce Scott became her sister's legal guardian, and brought Judith to live with her in California, a state where all mentally disabled citizens are entitled to an ongoing education.

Judith Scott died of natural causes at her sister's home in Dutch Flat, California, a few weeks short of her 62nd birthday. She outlived her life expectancy at birth by almost fifty years.

== Art ==
On April 1, 1987, Judith Scott began attending the Creative Growth Art Center in Oakland, one of the first organizations in the world to provide studio space for artists with disabilities. For almost two years, Judith showed little interest in any artistic activity. She was unexceptional with paint. She scribbled loops and circles, but her work contained no representational imagery, and she was so uninterested in creating that the staff was considering ending her involvement with the program.

Not until Judith casually observed a fiber art class conducted by visiting artist Sylvia Seventy did she have her artistic breakthrough. She made her first sculpture around 1988. Using the materials at hand, Judith spontaneously invented her own unique and radically different form of artistic expression. While other students were stitching, she was sculpting with an unprecedented zeal and concentration.

Her creative gifts and absolute focus were quickly recognized, and she was given complete freedom to choose her own materials. Taking whatever objects she found, regardless of ownership, she would wrap them in carefully selected colored yarns to create diverse sculptures of many different shapes. Some resemble cocoons or body parts, while others are elongated totemic poles. Many of her works also feature pairs, reflecting Scott's experience as a twin. Judith worked on her art five days a week for eighteen years, producing over 200 pieces in total.

Judith had her first exhibition in 1999, at the Creative Growth Art Center where, some hours before the exhibition opened, she was reunited with pieces of work that she had not seen for years. She and, later, the visiting public gave the pieces a warm welcome. The exhibition coincided with the publication of John MacGregor's book Metamorphosis: The Fiber Art of Judith Scott. Together, these events helped propel her to worldwide recognition.

Scott's work was featured in a retrospective at the Brooklyn Museum in 2014, which received acclaim in New York. She has also been the subject of major shows in Switzerland and Japan.

Her work was included in the 2024 exhibition Making Their Mark: Works from the Shah Garg Collection at the Berkeley Art Museum and Pacific Film Archive (BAMPFA).

=== Collections ===
Scott's work has become immensely popular in the world of outsider art, and her pieces sell for substantial sums. Scott is now hailed as a contemporary artist, no longer just an outsider. Her art is held in the permanent collections of many museums, including: Museum of Modern Art (Manhattan, New York), the American Visionary Art Museum (Baltimore, Maryland), San Francisco Museum of Modern Art, American Folk Art Museum (Manhattan, New York), Intuit: The Center for Intuitive and Outsider Art (Chicago, Illinois), Museum of Modern Art, and L'Aracine Musee D'Art Brut (Paris, France),

== Filmography ==
Year	Title	Type	Length	Notes
2006	Outsider: The Life and Art of Judith Scott.	Documentary	30 minutes	Made by San Francisco filmmaker Betsy Bayha.
2006	¿Qué tienes debajo del sombrero? (What's under your hat?)	Documentary	75 minutes	Made by Lola Barrera and Iñaki Peñafiel.
2006	Les Cocons Magiques de Judith Scott	Documentary	36 minutes	Made by Philippe Lespinasse, filmed a few weeks before Scott's death
2009	Make	Documentary	69 minutes	Scott Ogden and Malcolm Hearn produced film examines the lives and art-making techniques of Hawkins Bolden, Judith Scott, Prophet Royal Robertson, and Ike Morgan.

== Exhibitions ==
Below is a list of select notable exhibitions for Judith Scott.

=== Solo exhibitions ===
- 2018 – Judith Scott: Touchdown, Creative Growth Art Center, Oakland, California
- 2014-15 – Bound and Unbound, Brooklyn Museum, Brooklyn, New York
- 2009 – Judith Scott: Retrospective, Ricco Maresca Gallery, New York City, New York
- 2002 – Cocoon: Judith Scott, Ricco-Maresca Gallery, New York City, New York
- 2026 – Remembering Judith Scott, The Luckiest Light Art Gallery & Studio, Havre de Grace, Maryland

=== Group exhibitions ===
- 2019 – Memory Palaces: Inside the Collection of Audrey B. Heckler, American Folk Art Museum, New York City, New York
- 2019 – The Doors of Perception, Curated by Javier Téllez in collaboration with the Outsider Art Fair, Frieze Art Fair, New York City, New York
- 2019 – Flying High: Women Artists of Art Brut, Bank Austria Kunstforum, Vienna
- 2018 – Outliers and American Vanguard Art, National Gallery of Art, Washington DC
- 2017 – Forget Me Not: Judith Scott, Zuckerman Museum of Art, Kennesaw, Georgia
- 2017 – Viva Arte Viva, the 57th Venice Biennale, Venice, Italy
- 2015 – Collection ABCD, La Maison Rouge, Paris, France
- 2013 – Create, Creative Growth Art Center, Oakland, California
- 2013 – Create, Boca Raton Museum of Art, Boca Raton, Florida
- 2013 – Extreme Art, The Aldrich Contemporary Art Museum, Ridgefield, Connecticut
- 2012 – Rosemarie Trockel: A Cosmos, New Museum of Contemporary Art, New York City, New York
- 2011 – World Transformers, Schirn Kunsthalle Frankfurt, Frankfurt, Germany
- 2000 – Visions, American Visionary Art Museum, Baltimore, Maryland
- 2005 – Creative Growth, The Ricky Jay Broadside Collection, Yerba Buena Center for the Arts, San Francisco, California

== See also ==
- List of people with Down syndrome
