= Christmas Unicorn =

2012 single by Sufjan Stevens

- Cover artwork for the Christmas Unicorn EP

Single by Sufjan Stevens

from the album Silver & Gold
- Released: October 2, 2012
- Recorded: December 2010; February 2012
- Studio: Stevens's office (Brooklyn); Honey Jar (Brooklyn)
- Genre: Christmas; folk; electronic; orchestral pop; psychedelic pop
- Length: 12:28
- Label: Asthmatic Kitty
- Songwriters: Sufjan Stevens; Ian Curtis; Peter Hook; Stephen Morris; Bernard Sumner
- Producer: Sufjan Stevens

Sufjan Stevens singles chronology
| "Too Much" (2010) | "Christmas Unicorn" (2012) | "Take the Time" (2013) |

"Christmas Unicorn" is a song by the American singer-songwriter Sufjan Stevens. His record label Asthmatic Kitty released it on October 2, 2012, as the lead single from his box set, Silver & Gold (2012). Stevens chiefly authored the song himself, although because its second half substantially interpolates the song "Love Will Tear Us Apart" (1980) by the English rock band Joy Division, he credited that band's members – Ian Curtis, Peter Hook, Stephen Morris, and Bernard Sumner – as co-writers. Beginning as a folk song, it undergoes significant changes as it progresses. During its runtime in excess of 12 minutes, the song gradually builds volume as it metamorphoses into an electronic, orchestral pop, and psychedelic pop composition.

Stevens sings the lyrics of "Christmas Unicorn" from the point of view of its namesake creature, and details its many attributes. The lyrics are allegorical and incorporate references to multiple things that are traditionally associated with Christmas; these include criticism of consumerism. They also acknowledge the Pagan history of the nominally Christian holiday. Ultimately, Stevens concludes that the listener is themself a Christmas unicorn; several interpretations for this declaration exist, one of the foremost being solidarity with people who may possess unusual traits.

Music critics, musicologists, and theologians have analyzed "Christmas Unicorn" for its lyrical and musical themes. The song garnered positive critical reception upon release; reviewers of Silver & Gold often cited it as a highlight of the album. Stevens performed the song at each concert while touring behind Silver & Gold. These performances, for which he donned a custom costume made to resemble a Christmas unicorn, drew acclaim from concertgoers.

== Background and release ==
Stevens performing in 2006

In late 2006, Sufjan Stevens released a box set entitled Songs for Christmas, which comprised five extended plays (EPs) of Christmas music. These EPs contained a mix of traditional holiday standards and original compositions. Stevens gave each EP its own name: Noel; Hark!; Ding! Dong!; Joy; and Peace. He recorded them annually between 2001 and 2006 – except for 2004, when he was busy working on his studio album, Illinois (2005) – and originally gifted them to his loved ones each holiday season, before he released them as a box set. Stevens continued this tradition each year through 2010, resulting in five more EPs which eventually formed another box set, Silver & Gold (2012). All ten EPs presented unorthodox, subversive, and eclectic approaches to Christmas music. At one point, Stevens strongly disliked the holiday, but eventually came to love it through his work on the EPs. Even so, he remained critical of the consumerism associated with Christmas.

As with Songs for Christmas, each of Silver & Gold's EPs received an individual name: Gloria; I Am Santa's Helper; Christmas Infinity Voyage; Let It Snow; and Christmas Unicorn. Additionally, each EP had its own cover artwork. Marking Silver & Gold as a sequel to Songs for Christmas, these EPs constituted volumes six through ten of the overall series. Stevens's record label, Asthmatic Kitty, announced Silver & Gold on October 2, 2012, with a release date of November 13. Concurrently with the announcement, the label released the title track of the Christmas Unicorn EP – also the closing track of the 58 included in the box set – as the lead single.

Stevens recorded and self-produced the song in his Brooklyn office in December 2010, with engineering assistance from Alex Sopp, who also contributes flutes, and Vesper Stamper. Devin Greenwood served as the engineer for the percussion which appears courtesy of Brian Wolfe, who recorded his parts at Honey Jar in Brooklyn in February 2012; the percussion was added to "Christmas Unicorn" in post-production. The song features additional vocals from the Unicorn Choir, which consisted of Stamper, Sonya Hofer, Cat Martino, and Rosie Thomas. Although the song is chiefly an original Stevens composition, he shares writing credits with the four members of the English rock band Joy Division: Ian Curtis, Peter Hook, Stephen Morris, and Bernard Sumner.

== Composition ==
"Christmas Unicorn" is a Christmas song that runs for 12 minutes and 28 seconds, during which it undergoes significant changes. It begins as a folk song centered on harp and the double-tracked vocals of Stevens, who sings from the point of view of the titular unicorn. It is ornamented with items traditionally associated with Christmas, including a wreath and mistletoe, as well as things one would not normally associate with Christmas nor unicorns, such as a bowtie, a shield, a "billy goat beard", and a "uniform made of gold". It also has a credit card permanently attached to its wrist. The unicorn, unapologetic of its unusual nature, sees many other oddball unicorns like it: "We are legions wide, and we choose no sides". As the lyrics detail the many attributes of the Christmas unicorn, the music slowly incorporates more layers of instruments, including percussion and electronics, until roughly the 2:29 mark. Just before then, most of the instruments go quiet as the protagonist ultimately concludes that the listener is themself a Christmas unicorn: "You may dress in the human uniform, child, but I know you're just like me". (Note: Attributed to multiple sources:)

After this declaration, the instruments return and the song continues gradually building intensity. Stevens wordlessly sings a melody which had been present in the background during much of the first 2:29 of the song. Sonic layers continue to accumulate, as flutes and electric guitar gradually appear, and the earlier acoustic instrumentation fades away. During this process, "Christmas Unicorn" transitions from folk music to electronic music and orchestral, psychedelic pop. Stevens introduces the chorus, and repeats it for much of the song's remaining runtime: "I'm the Christmas unicorn / (Find the Christmas unicorn) / You're the Christmas unicorn, too / It's all right, I love you". Repeated synthesizer notes surface around 5:18 in, followed by piano at approximately the 6:04 mark as the synthesizer undergoes tonal shifts. A drum fill near the 6:29 mark heralds an increase in tempo, as the formerly slow song establishes a moderate pace. Two seconds later, the Unicorn Choir emerges in the foreground.

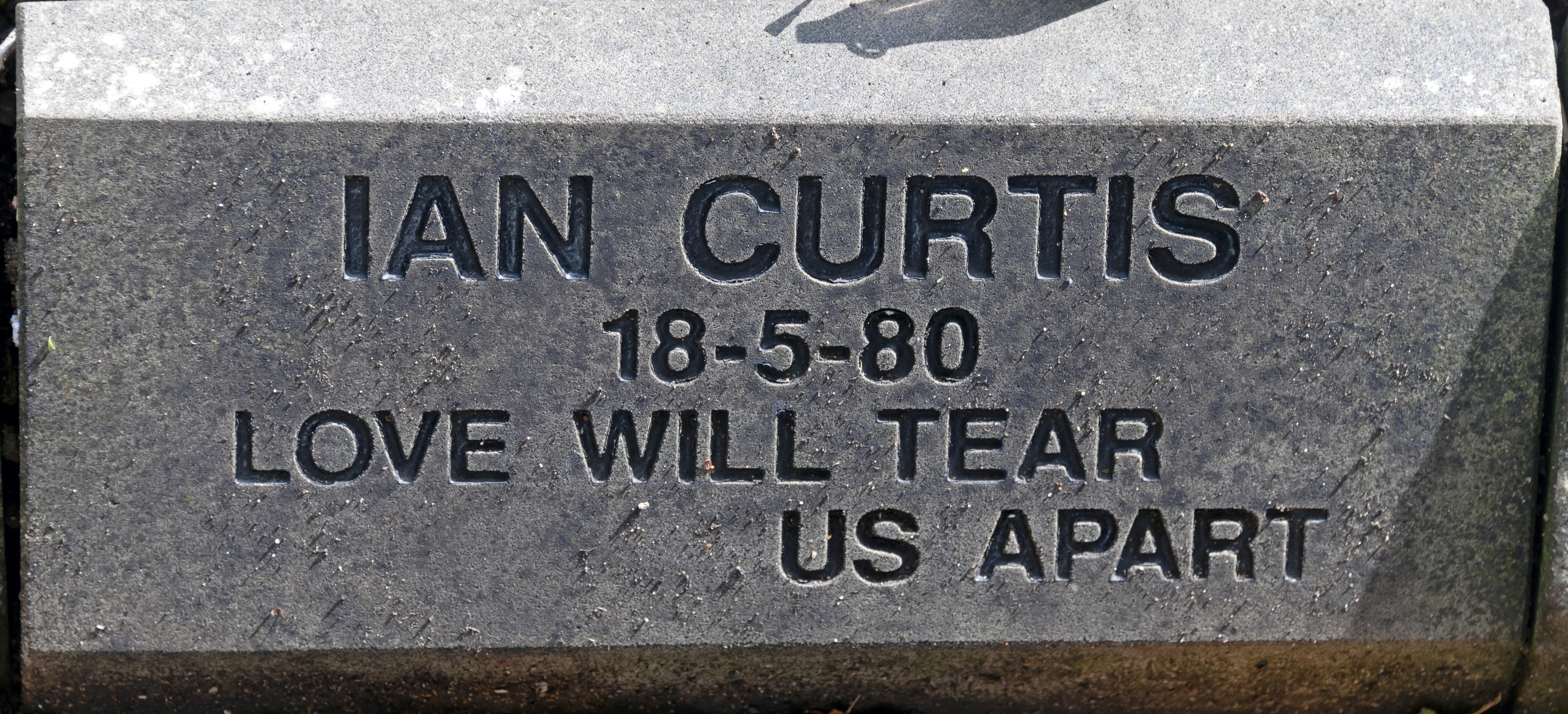
The grave marker of Joy Division frontman Ian Curtis (pictured in 2014)

During its second half, "Christmas Unicorn" substantially interpolates the song "Love Will Tear Us Apart" (1980) by Joy Division. The melody from that song first appears on synthesizer in the background near the 7:00 mark. After 33 seconds, all of the instruments go quiet except for the synthesizer and percussion, thereby placing greater emphasis on the melody as the song begins to build towards its climax. At roughly 8:36 in, the Unicorn Choir starts quoting the chorus lyrics of "Love Will Tear Us Apart". Instruments gradually enter once again, including new ones such as church bells. The song climaxes between the 10:00 and 11:00 marks with a dense sound mass comprising many distinct instruments, voices, and melodies. After this, the song winds down; most of the elements gradually disappear to reveal synthesizer arpeggios, which themselves fade out as the song concludes. Widely considered to be of unusual construction for a Christmas song, it appeared on a 2018 list from Billboard of the strangest Christmas music.

=== Analysis ===
"Christmas Unicorn" has been the subject of extensive analysis from music critics, musicologists, and theologians. In an album review for Sputnikmusic, Thompson D. Gerhart called the song "an all-out assault on everything supposedly improper" about Christmas traditions. Maddy Costa for The Guardian deemed it "a distressingly melodic, profoundly odd hymn of solidarity with outsiders everywhere". Graeme Thomson of Uncut and Helen Brown of The Daily Telegraph both compared the song to children's music. Thomson described it as "a kind of cosmic manifesto disguised as a children's song", while Brown likened its first two minutes to a "child's riddle", although she also wrote that the rest of the song subverted this initial impression. Paste's Ryan Reed wrote that the song contributed to the diversity of Silver & Gold's material, which he said "touch[ed] on a bit of everything [Stevens had done] well".

Christ and Pop Culture's Chad Ashby, who categorized "Christmas Unicorn" as a "pensive" ballad, assessed that the song combined several definitions of the holiday and defied the notion of a single "right way" to celebrate it. Additionally, he wrote that the line "I'm a frantic shopper and a brave pill-popper" was commentary on the "bastardiz[ation]" of Christmas through consumerism and commercialism. Ashby saw the affirmation of "It's all right, I love you" as a rebuke of the idea that "love will tear [people] apart". He ultimately derived two interpretations for what the Christmas unicorn could represent: Jesus, in light of the fantastical circumstances which surrounded his birth; and "the feeling of Christmas". Mark Beuving, a former associate professor at Eternity Bible College, concurred with Ashby that "Christmas Unicorn" presented multiple meanings of Christmas. Beuving remarked that the lyrics mixed seemingly incongruous elements in a manner which emphasized not only the eclectic variety of traditions associated with Christmas, but also – citing Stevens's references to the Christmas tree as a "Pagan tree" and the Christmas unicorn as a "Pagan heresy" – the peculiarity of a nominally Christian holiday having origins in Paganism. Beuving further posited that the lyrics both contained criticism of the commercialization of Christmas, and advocated that any one person can decide what Christmas means to them.

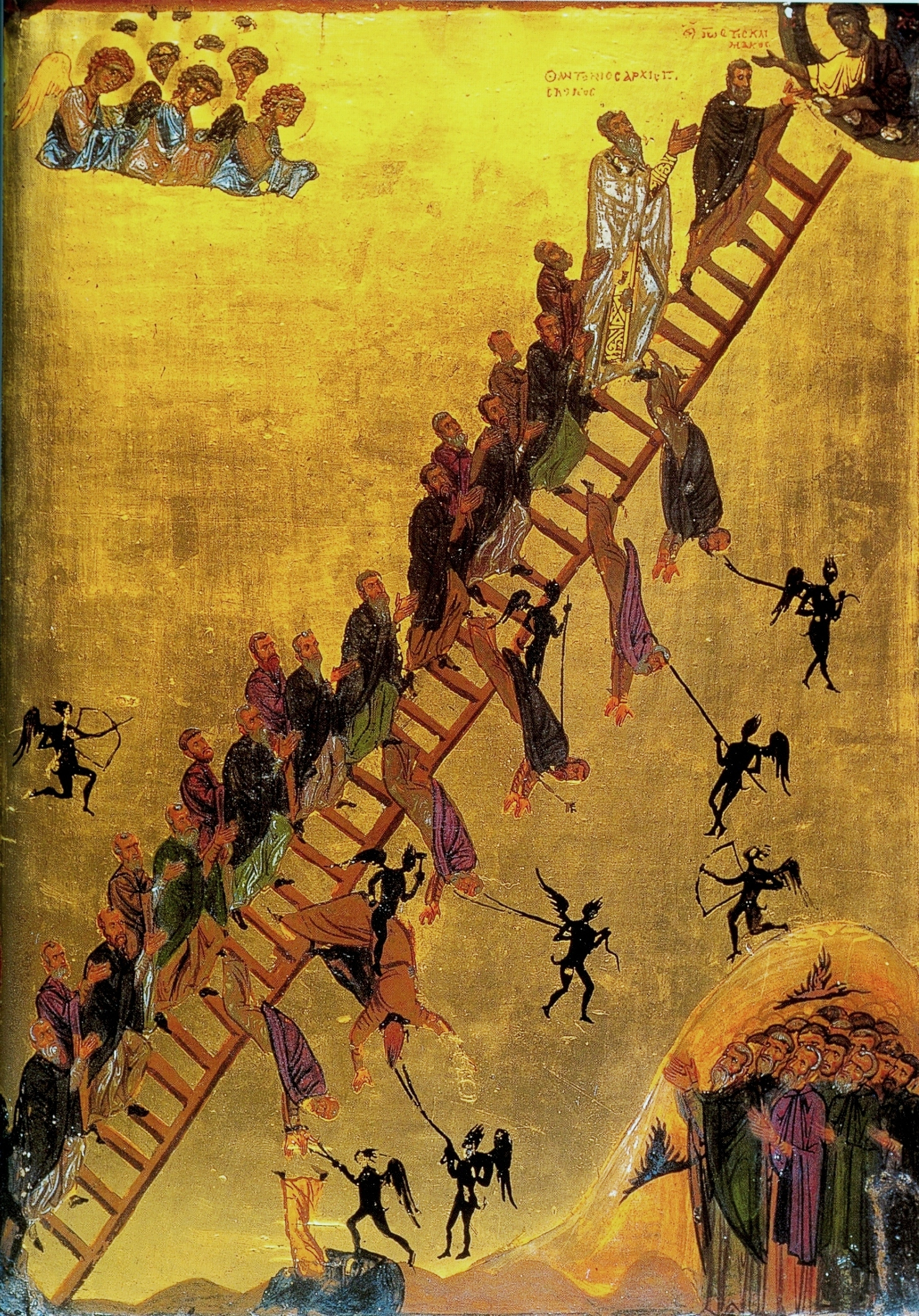
Janna Martindale's analysis of "Christmas Unicorn" likened the song's chorus to the process of theosis, or deification.

A 2014 research paper by Janna Martindale examined "Christmas Unicorn" from several angles. Martindale argued that, given the release of Silver & Gold in a postmodern societal environment, Stevens was aware that his predominantly young adult audience would approach the idea of a Christmas-themed unicorn with ironic humor. Additionally, she observed that contemporary Internet culture had appropriated the unicorn as a symbol of whimsy and association with the LGBTQ spectrum. However, she also drew parallels between the ancient Pagan hunt for the unicorn – the horn of which was fabled to have medicinal properties – and the Crucifixion of Jesus. She surmised that Stevens employed the unicorn as a symbol in line with the medeival Christian interpretation that it represented Jesus, and that the chorus of "Christmas Unicorn" extended the allegory to imply that all humans are Christmas unicorns, "echo[ing] the Christian claim that every person is made in the image of God". She also believed each repetition of the chorus to evoke deification and the Incarnation of Jesus.

Martindale tied the interpolation of "Love Will Tear Us Apart" into her theological interpretations of the song. Having written that Silver & Gold explored "the paradox of love and death", she said that the interpolation reflected the notion that although suicide – such as that of Curtis – is a "perverted" form of death, Jesus still sacrificed himself as an act of love. Musicologically, Martindale remarked that the song's gradual transition from a lyrically busy folk song to a lyrically sparse electronic composition was emblematic of the commercialism found in contemporary culture, and that it reflected society being too busy to listen to words. In 2026, Martindale's analysis of "Christmas Unicorn" served as inspiration for the musicologist Daniel White's study of metamodern characteristics within the song's music.

== Critical reception ==
"Christmas Unicorn" elicited a warm response from music critics. Reviewing the song upon release as a single, Beats Per Minute's Weston Fleming rated it eight out of ten and, despite its release in October, considered it to be an ideal Christmas present: "[Listeners would] never [think] to ask for it, but upon receiving it, [would be] too terrified to imagine so bleak a future without it." Writing for Colorado Daily, Deanna Hardies praised the lyrics as "fantastic" and "hilarious". Al Horner for NME called the song "as batshit insane as it is irresistibly infectious". In 2025, Slant Magazine ranked "Christmas Unicorn" at number 13 on its list of the best Christmas songs of the 21st century; the magazine's Eric Mason wrote that Stevens successfully juxtaposed the bleakness of Joy Division with the joviality of Christmas music.

Reviews of Silver & Gold often championed "Christmas Unicorn" as a highlight of the album. In a review for Pitchfork, Ryan Dombal called the song a "blowout finale" and praised how it progressed from beginning to end. He regarded the interpolation of "Love Will Tear Us Apart" as well-judged and remarked that it reflected the bittersweet contradictions of Christmas. Andrew Hannah for The Line of Best Fit hailed the song as the best on the album; Hannah likened the effect of the interpolated melody to one's heart being hugged, and acclaimed its inclusion as a "stroke of utter genius". To Drowned in Sound's Marc Burrows, the song was "both the oddest and also the most brilliant" of the album's 58 songs. Burrows remarked that the song sounded frivolous in the beginning, but also that it rebuked this initial impression through its use of tension and release. He further considered that hearing Joy Division in a joyful context was unexpected. Zachary Houle of PopMatters surmised that "Christmas Unicorn" was the most likely song on Silver & Gold to become a Christmas standard. Andy Gill named the song a key track in his review for The Independent, and called it a "suitably fantastical" album closer. Costa was less enthusiastic; she complimented the song in isolation, but criticized its inclusion on Silver & Gold as contributing to a large and disorganized array of ideas.

== Live performances ==
Stevens performing "Christmas Unicorn" at Metro Chicago on December 15, 2012

Stevens frequently performed "Christmas Unicorn" during his tour for Silver & Gold, the Surfjohn Stevens Christmas Sing-A-Long: Seasonal Affective Disorder Yuletide Disaster Pageant on Ice. He played it as the final song before the encore, and introduced it by telling the audience: "It's that part of you that's all love and all joy. This is the tale of the Christmas Unicorn." Performances featured Stevens getting into costume as a Christmas unicorn; the costume included a custom headpiece, balloons, and tinsel. Reviewing a December 4 show at the Fonda Theatre in Hollywood for Under the Radar, Laura Studarus described Stevens's costume as resembling a cross between a unicorn and an octopus. Martindale wrote that it subverted stereotypes associated with hipsters and gender roles.

In a review of a December 15 concert at Metro Chicago, Sarah Brooks of Gapers Block noted that the song brought out a great amount of energy from Stevens, who she said "jolted across the stage, jumping off amps and other musical equipment pieces, [and] climbing side beams". Studarus recounted Stevens and his crew firing confetti cannons and unleashing inflatable unicorns into the audience during the song. Other elements of the tour included references to "Christmas Unicorn". To determine the setlist for each night, concertgoers and members of Stevens's backing band took turns spinning a giant roulette-esque wheel that was labeled with various Christmas carols. At the center of the wheel was an illustration of the head of the "Christmas Donkicorn": a pink, donkey–unicorn hybrid character which the graphic artist Stephen Halker created, and which the packaging for Silver & Gold included as a sticker. Additionally, band and audience members often wore headpieces that resembled unicorn horns.

Performances of "Christmas Unicorn" drew praise from concertgoers. The Philadelphia Inquirer's Dan Deluca called it the best song of a November 23 show at Union Transfer, the first date of the tour. Similarly, David Harris of Spectrum Culture remarked that Stevens "saved the best for last" at Aladdin Theater in Portland, Oregon, and reported enthusiastic reactions from the crowd. Writing for Beats Per Minute, Joshua Pickard described a November 27 rendition at Track 29 in Chattanooga, Tennessee, as a "festive behemoth". He believed the song to be well-suited as a set closer and complimented it as "affective without coming across as fraudulently self-aware". Studarus praised it as "impressive", while Brooks highlighted it as a "bizarre" song that captivated the audience. Jon M. Gilbertson for the Milwaukee Journal Sentinel was less positive when reviewing a December 13 concert at Turner Hall Ballroom; Gilbertson felt that the song conveyed a message that "Christmas can be whatever you want it to be", but found the song itself to be overlong.

== Personnel ==
Credits are adapted from Martindale, a Dork song listing, and Bandcamp.

- Sufjan Stevens – vocals, other instruments, mixing
- Alex Sopp – flutes, "bells and whistles", background vocals, engineering
- Brian Wolfe – percussion
- Unicorn Choir – additional vocals
  - Sonya Hofer
  - Cat Martino
  - Vesper Stamper (also engineering) (Note: Bandcamp additionally credits Stamper with "many voices/many rooms, many hats, multiple tasks," and "great strength".)
  - Rosie Thomas
- Devin Greenwood – engineering

== Notes ==
=== Sources ===
- Anon.[a] (n.d.). "Christmas Unicorn from Silver & Gold by Sufjan Stevens". Bandcamp.
- Anon.[b] (n.d.). "Sufjan Stevens – Christmas Unicorn (2012) | Track profile". Dork.
- Ashby, Chad (December 8, 2017). "Let Sufjan Stevens help you find your 'Christmas Unicorn'". Christ and Pop Culture.
- Battan, Carrie (October 2, 2012). "Sufjan Stevens announces new Christmas box set". Pitchfork.
- Beuving, Mark (December 19, 2012). "Sufjan Stevens' Christmas Unicorn". Eternity Bible College.
- Breihan, Tom (October 2, 2012). "Sufjan Stevens – 'Christmas Unicorn'". Stereogum.
- Brooks, Sarah (December 18, 2012). "Review: Sufjan Stevens @ The Metro, 12/15". Gapers Block.
- Brown, Helen (December 7, 2012). "Sufjan Stevens, Silver and Gold, album review". The Daily Telegraph.
- Burrows, Marc (November 12, 2012). "Album review: Sufjan Stevens – Silver & Gold". Drowned in Sound.
- Costa, Maddy (December 13, 2012). "Sufjan Stevens: Silver and Gold: Songs for Christmas, Vols 6–10 – review". The Guardian.
- Deluca, Dan (November 24, 2012). "Review: Sufjan Stevens at Union Transfer". The Philadelphia Inquirer. Archived from the original on May 21, 2025.
- Dombal, Ryan (November 14, 2012). "Sufjan Stevens: Silver & Gold album review". Pitchfork.
- Fleming, Weston (October 4, 2012). "Track review: Sufjan Stevens – 'Christmas Unicorn'". Beats Per Minute.
- Gerhart, Thompson D. (December 26, 2012). "Review: Sufjan Stevens – Silver & Gold". Sputnikmusic.
- Gilbertson, Jon M. (December 14, 2012). "Sufjan Stevens enchants fans with silly sing-along 'Christmess'". Milwaukee Journal Sentinel.
- Gill, Andy (December 20, 2012). "Album: Sufjan Stevens, Silver & Gold (Asthmatic Kitty)". The Independent.
- Hannah, Andrew (November 22, 2012). "Sufjan Stevens 'Silver and Gold'". The Line of Best Fit.
- Hardies, Deanna (November 26, 2012). "Album review: Sufjan Stevens, 'Silver & Gold'". Colorado Daily.
- Harris, David (December 13, 2012). "Concert review: Sufjan Stevens". Spectrum Culture.
- Horner, Al (December 13, 2012). "Sufjan Stevens – 'Silver & Gold'". NME.
- Houle, Zachary (November 20, 2012). "Sufjan Stevens: Silver & Gold: Songs for Christmas – Volumes Six–10". PopMatters.
- Jenkins, Craig (November 30, 2022). "Sufjan Stevens on Christmas music, holiday memories". Vulture.
- Martindale, Janna (May 2014). I'm a Christmas unicorn: A musicological and theological analysis of Sufjan Stevens's song, 'Christmas Unicorn'. Honors (BA thesis). Baylor University.
- Mason, Eric (December 14, 2025). "The 21 best Christmas songs of the 21st century (so far!)". Slant Magazine.
- Mitchum, Rob (November 21, 2006). "Sufjan Stevens: Songs for Christmas album review". Pitchfork.
- Pickard, Joshua (December 21, 2012). "Live review and photos: Sufjan Stevens, November 27, 2012, Track 29 – Chattanooga, TN". Beats Per Minute.
- Reed, Ryan (November 20, 2012). "Sufjan Stevens: Silver & Gold". Paste.
- Studarus, Laura (December 7, 2012). "Sufjan Stevens at the Henry Fonda Theatre, Hollywood, CA, December 4th, 2012". Under the Radar.
- Thomson, Graeme (n.d.). "Sufjan Stevens – Silver and Gold: Songs for Christmas Vols. 6 – 10". Uncut. Archived from the original on February 7, 2013.
- Weatherby, Taylor (December 6, 2018). "23 of the most unconventional Christmas songs". Billboard.
- White, Daniel (February 5, 2026). "Christmas in July: A Musicological Analysis of Metamodernist Impulses in Sufjan Stevens' Christmas Collections". My Impossible Soul: The Metamodern Music of Sufjan Stevens. Bloomsbury Publishing. p. 155–178. doi:10.5040/9798216351962.0017. ISBN 9798216351955.
