= Frances Chung (dancer) =

Canadian ballet dancer

- Born: 1983 or 1984 (age 41–42); Vancouver, British Columbia, Canada
- Occupation: Ballet dancer
- Years active: 2001-present
- Children: 2
- Career
- Current group: San Francisco Ballet
- Dances: Ballet

Frances Chung is a Canadian ballet dancer. She is currently a principal dancer at the San Francisco Ballet.

== Early life ==
Chung was born in Vancouver and is of Chinese descent. Her father worked for an electronic company, her mother was a cook, and her sister works in finance. She started ballet and playing the piano when she was five, at a community centre near her home. She attended Magee Secondary School and trained at Goh Ballet Academy. Though most of Chung's teachers are Chinese, she was trained in multiple dance styles, such as French, Russian and English. She also did contemporary, jazz, and Asian dance. However, she did not have any American training. When she was 16, she attended a summer intensives at Boston Ballet, she was then asked to join the studio company, but her mother insisted she graduate high school.

== Career ==
In 2001, after she finished high school, Chung joined the San Francisco Ballet, at the age of 17. Chung stated that part of the reason she joined the company was because she wanted to stay on the west coast. She was named soloist in 2005 and principal dancer in 2009. Chung has danced roles such as Odette/Odile in Swan Lake, Princess Aurora in The Sleeping Beauty and the title role in Cinderella. She has participated in San Francisco Ballet's co-production with other companies, such as a stepsister in Cinderella with Dutch National Ballet and Elizabeth Lavenza in Frankenstein with The Royal Ballet. She has also originated roles such as in Stanton Welch's Bespoke and Dwight Rhoden's LET'S BEGIN AT THE END.

Outside of San Francisco Ballet, Chung has danced in galas in Canada, United States, Mexico, Germany, Australia, France and Italy. In 2018, she danced in Welch's Swan Lake, with Houston Ballet.

== Selected repertoire ==
Chung's repertoire with the San Francisco Ballet includes:

- Agon (pas de trois)
- Anima Animus
- Ballo della Regina
- La Bayadère, Act II (Nikiya and 3rd Solo Shade in “The Kingdom of the Shades”)
- Le Carnaval des Animaux (Turtle)
- Chroma
- Cinderella (Cinderella and Stepsister Clementine)
- Coppélia (Swanilda)
- Dances at a Gathering (Yellow)
- Don Quixote (Kitri, Kitri's Friends, and Queen of the Driads)
- Drink to Me Only With Thine Eyes
- Frankenstein (Elizabeth Lavenza)
- Giselle (Giselle, Myrtha, Peasant pas de cinq, and Solo Wili)
- Emeralds & Rubies from Jewels
- The Nutcracker (Queen of the Snow, Snowflakes, Sugar Plum Fairy, Spanish, Flowers, and Grand Pas de Deux Ballerina)
- Paquita (demi-soloist and pas de trois)
- Raymonda Act III (Raymonda)
- Romeo & Juliet (Acrobats)
- Rush
- Serenade (Russian Girl and Angel)
- Piano Concerto #1 in Shostakovich Trilogy
- Sandpaper Ballet
- The Sleeping Beauty (Aurora, pas de six, and Enchanted Princess/Bluebird pas de deux)
- Swan Lake (Odette/Odile, Neapolitan, Act I pas de trois, Russian Princess, and Czardas)
- Sylvia
- Symphony in C
- Symphonic Variations
- Tchaikovsky Pas de Deux
- Theme and Variations
- Within the Golden Hour

=== Originated roles ===
- Bespoke
- Borealis
- Borderlands
- Fearful Symmetries
- Hummingbird
- In the Countenance of Kings (Electress)
- LET’S BEGIN AT THE END
- Naked
- Pas/Parts 2016
- The Ruins Proclaim the Building Was Beautiful
- Thread
- Underskin

== Awards ==
- Isadora Duncan Award for Outstanding Achievement in Performance (Individual) for San Francisco Ballet's 2013 Repertory Season.
- Finalist at the Helsinki International Competition, 2001.
- Awarded silver medal (no gold medal awarded) at the Adeline Genée Awards, London, 2000.
- Finalist and prizewinner at the Prix de Lausanne, 2000.
- 3rd place with partner Nozomi Haga at the Japan National Pas de Deux Competition, 1999.

== Personal life ==
Chung is married. The couple welcomed a son, Forest Tan, in 2019. They welcomed they second child, a daughter, Faye Ella, in 2023.
