= Carrie & Lowell =

2015 studio album by Sufjan Stevens

Studio album by Sufjan Stevens
- Released: March 31, 2015
- Recorded: 2014
- Studios: Flora (Portland); Black Watch (Norman); April Base (Eau Claire); Pat Dillett's studio (Manhattan); Asthmatic Kitty (Dumbo); Hotel rooms (Klamath Falls)
- Genres: Indie folk; lo-fi
- Length: 43:35
- Label: Asthmatic Kitty
- Producers: Sufjan Stevens; Thomas Bartlett

Sufjan Stevens chronology
Silver & Gold (2012)	Carrie & Lowell (2015)	Carrie & Lowell Live (2017)

Singles from Carrie & Lowell
- 1. "No Shade in the Shadow of the Cross" Released: February 16, 2015; 2. "Should Have Known Better" Released: March 11, 2015; 3. "Carrie & Lowell" Released: March 17, 2015

Carrie & Lowell is the seventh studio album by the American musician Sufjan Stevens. It was released on March 31, 2015, by Asthmatic Kitty. It was produced by Stevens, and features guest contributions from Thomas Bartlett, Sean Carey, Casey Foubert, Ben Lester, Nedelle Torrisi, and Laura Veirs.

Unlike Stevens' previous album, the electronic The Age of Adz (2010), Carrie & Lowell features sparse instrumentation. Music critics noted the album's instrumentation as being reminiscent of the performer's earlier indie folk–inspired material. Lyrically, the album sees him explore the fallout from the 2012 death of his mother Carrie, and the relationship between Stevens and Carrie's second husband Lowell Brams, who helped Stevens establish Asthmatic Kitty.

Carrie & Lowell was supported by the lead singles "No Shade in the Shadow of the Cross" and "Should Have Known Better". The album saw word-of-mouth marketing through its one-week preview on NPR, and after the song "Death with Dignity" featured in the video games Life Is Strange 2 (2018) and The Awesome Adventures of Captain Spirit (2018). Stevens later supported the album through the Carrie & Lowell Tour, which spanned North America, Europe, and Australasia.

Carrie & Lowell received immediate widespread critical success, with many labeling it Stevens' best, and it was routinely named among the best albums of 2015 in many publications' year-end lists. Commercially, Carrie & Lowell debuted and peaked at number ten on the US Billboard 200 with 53,000 equivalent album units, of which 51,000 came from pure sales; as of July 2015, the album has sold 105,000 units in the US, with almost half sold on vinyl.

== Recording and background ==
The songs on the album were recorded in 2014 at Stevens' office in Dumbo, Brooklyn and Pat Dillett's studio in Midtown Manhattan. Some of the songs were also recorded in Oregon, at Portland's Flora Recording & Playback with Tucker Martine and on an iPhone in a Klamath Falls hotel room. A few songs were also tracked in Oklahoma, at Norman's Blackwatch Studios, and in Wisconsin, at Eau Claire's April Base Studios. The songs were inspired by the 2012 death of his mother, Carrie, and the family trips they took to Oregon in Stevens' childhood. Stevens' mother, who suffered from depression, schizophrenia, and substance abuse, abandoned him when he was a year old. According to Stevens, recording the album helped him come to terms with her death and provide closure. The album title also references his stepfather, Lowell, who helped co-found Stevens' record company Asthmatic Kitty.

The album was produced by Thomas Bartlett, known as Doveman, a musician and friend of Stevens who had recently lost a brother to cancer. Of Bartlett's production role, Stevens said, "Thomas took all these sketches and made sense of it all. He called me out on my bullshit. He said: 'These are your songs. This is your record.' He was ruthless." In the same interview, on the emotions in the album's recording process, Stevens said:

I was recording songs as a means of grieving, making sense of it. But the writing and recording wasn't the salve I expected. I fell deeper and deeper into doubt and misery. It was a year of real darkness. In the past my work had a real reciprocity of resources—I would put something in and get something from it. But not this time.

== Commercial performance ==
Carrie & Lowell debuted at number ten on the Billboard 200, with 53,000 equivalent album units; it sold 51,000 copies in its first week, with the remainder of its unit count reflecting the album's streaming activity and track sales. The album also debuted at number 10 on the Canadian Albums Chart with sales of 4,400. As of July 2015, Carrie & Lowell has sold 105,000 copies in the United States, with 44,900 of its total having been sold on vinyl.

As of June 2017, it was certified silver by British Phonographic Industry for 60,000 sold units in UK.

== Critical reception ==
Professional ratings
Aggregate scores
Source	Rating
AnyDecentMusic?	8.8/10
Metacritic	90/100
Review scores
Source	Rating
AllMusic	5/5 stars
The A.V. Club	A
The Daily Telegraph	5/5 stars
Entertainment Weekly	A−
The Guardian	5/5 stars
The Independent	4/5 stars
NME	9/10
Pitchfork	9.3/10 (2015); 10/10 (2025)
Rolling Stone	4/5 stars
Spin	8/10

Carrie & Lowell received universal acclaim from critics, noted at review aggregator Metacritic. It has a weighted average score of 90 out of 100, based on 40 reviews. It was the second-best rated album of 2015 on the site. Album of the Year surveyed 47 critics and gave Carrie & Lowell a 91 out of 100, making it the second-best reviewed album of the year; AnyDecentMusic? summed up critical consensus as 8.8 out of 10, based on 43 reviews. In 2020, Consequence of Sound ranked several of Stevens' studio albums, with this one as the best.

Andrew Hannah of The 405 proclaimed that "Carrie & Lowell is just the latest in a long line of unimpeachable achievements." In his review for Pitchfork, writer Brandon Stosuy wrote, "Sufjan Stevens' new album, Carrie & Lowell, is his best." Stephen Carlick of Exclaim! called the record "a quietly triumphant return for Stevens, announced not by fireworks but by a series of small, elegant moments that reach for the heart." Writing for The Boston Globe, James Reed praised the album's lyrics as well as the instrumentation; Reed noted that he would listen to just the instrumentals.

Accolades for Carrie & Lowell
Publication	Accolade	Year	Rank
The A.V. Club	The 15 Best Albums of 2015	2015	3
The A.V. Club	The 50 Best Albums of the 2010s	2019	15
The Guardian	The 50 Best Albums of 2015	2015	2
The Guardian	The 100 Best Albums of the 21st Century	2019	37
Musica Neto	The 100 Best Albums of 2015	2015	1
NME	NME'S Albums of the Year 2015	2015	24
Pitchfork	The 50 Best Albums of 2015	2015	6
Pitchfork	Readers' Top 50 Albums	2015	2
Pitchfork	The 200 Best Albums of the 2010s	2019	17
HMV	Best of the Year 2015	2015	1
Rough Trade	Albums of the Year 2015	2015	12
Stereogum	The 50 Best Albums of 2015	2015	5
OOR	Album of the Year	2015	1

== Track listing ==
All tracks are written by Sufjan Stevens.

No.	Title	Length
1.	"Death with Dignity"	3:59
2.	"Should Have Known Better"	5:07
3.	"All of Me Wants All of You"	3:41
4.	"Drawn to the Blood"	3:18
5.	"Eugene"	2:26
6.	"Fourth of July"	4:39
7.	"The Only Thing"	4:44
8.	"Carrie & Lowell"	3:14
9.	"John My Beloved"	5:04
10.	"No Shade in the Shadow of the Cross"	2:40
11.	"Blue Bucket of Gold"	4:43

10th Anniversary Edition bonus tracks
No.	Title	Length
1.	"Death with Dignity" (Demo)	4:02
2.	"Should Have Known Better" (Demo)	4:13
3.	"Eugene" (Demo)	2:28
4.	"The Only Thing" (Demo)	4:42
5.	"Mystery Of Love" (Demo)	4:04
6.	"Wallow Lake Monster" (Version 2)	6:40
7.	"Fourth of July" (Version 4)	13:51

Note

- The track "Eugene" appears as track 8 on vinyl releases.

== Personnel ==
Performance

- Sufjan Stevens – vocals, guitar, mixing
- Thomas Bartlett – vocals, mixing, piano on "Should Have Known Better"
- Sean Carey
- Casey Foubert
- Ben Lester
- Nedelle Torrisi
- Laura Veirs – backing vocals on "Should Have Known Better"

Technical personnel

- Josh Bonati – mastering and vinyl cutting
- Pat Dillett – mixing
- Chad Copelin – engineering (at Black Watch)
- Jarod Evans – engineering (at Black Watch)
- Brian Joseph – engineering (April Base)
- Tucker Martine – engineering (at Flora)

== Charts ==
=== Weekly charts ===
Weekly chart performance of Carrie & Lowell
Chart (2015)	Peak position
Australian Albums (ARIA)	11
Austrian Albums (Ö3 Austria)	68
Belgian Albums (Ultratop Flanders)	10
Belgian Albums (Ultratop Wallonia)	33
Dutch Albums (Album Top 100)	6
Finnish Albums (Suomen virallinen lista)	38
French Albums (SNEP)	50
German Albums (Offizielle Top 100)	51
New Zealand Albums (RMNZ)	27
Norwegian Albums (VG-lista)	9
Portuguese Albums (AFP)	18
Scottish Albums (Official Charts)	6
Spanish Albums (Promusicae)	30
Swedish Albums (Sverigetopplistan)	27
Swiss Albums (Schweizer Hitparade)	29
UK Albums (Official Charts)	6
UK Independent Albums (Official Charts)	2
US Billboard 200	10
US Independent Albums (Billboard)	1
US Top Alternative Albums (Billboard)	2
US Americana/Folk Albums (Billboard)	1
US Top Rock Albums (Billboard)	2
US Indie Store Album Sales (Billboard)	1

=== Year-end charts ===
Annual chart performance of Carrie & Lowell
Chart (2015)	Position
Belgian Albums (Ultratop Flanders)	84
Dutch Albums (MegaCharts)	98
US Independent Albums (Billboard)	14
US Alternative Albums (Billboard)	26
US Americana/Folk Albums (Billboard)	9
US Top Rock Albums (Billboard)	37
US Tastemakers (Billboard)	3

== Certifications ==
Certifications for Carrie & Lowell
Region	Certification	Certified units/sales
Denmark (IFPI Danmark)	Gold	10,000^{‡}
United Kingdom (BPI)	Gold	100,000^{‡}
United States (RIAA)	Gold	500,000^{‡}
^{‡} Sales+streaming figures based on certification alone.

== Carrie & Lowell Live ==
Carrie & Lowell Live

Live album by Sufjan Stevens
- Released: April 28, 2017
- Recorded: November 9, 2015
- Venues: North Charleston Performing Arts Center, South Carolina
- Genres: Indie rock, indie folk, synth-pop
- Length: 88:47
- Label: Asthmatic Kitty
- Producer: Sufjan Stevens

Sufjan Stevens chronology
Carrie & Lowell (2015)	Carrie & Lowell Live (2017)	Planetarium (2017)

Professional ratings
Aggregate scores
Source	Rating
Metacritic	91/100
Review scores
Source	Rating
The Independent	5/5 stars
Pitchfork	7.7/10
Sputnikmusic	5/5 stars
Under The Radar	7.5/10

Carrie & Lowell Live is a live album and concert film released on April 28, 2017 through Asthmatic Kitty. It was recorded live at North Charleston Performing Arts Center, South Carolina on November 9, 2015 during the Carrie & Lowell Tour. The performance was filmed and produced by We Are Films and features many new interpretations, re-workings, and expansions of the songs from Carrie & Lowell. The full concert film was made available to stream for free on Vimeo and YouTube.

1. "Redford (For Yia-Yia and Pappou)" – 3:27
2. "Death with Dignity" – 4:07
3. "Should Have Known Better" – 6:04
4. "All of Me Wants All of You" – 6:30
5. "John My Beloved" – 5:49
6. "The Only Thing" – 5:42
7. "Fourth of July" – 6:41
8. "No Shade in the Shadow of the Cross" – 3:34
9. "Carrie & Lowell" – 4:38
10. "Drawn to the Blood" – 4:27
11. "Eugene" – 2:52
12. "Vesuvius" – 8:14
13. "Futile Devices" – 3:36
14. "Blue Bucket of Gold" – 5:35
15. "Blue Bucket Outro" – 12:46
16. "Hotline Bling" (Drake cover, encore, featuring Gallant) – 4:44

=== Charts ===
Weekly chart performance of Carrie & Lowell Live
Chart (2016)	Peak position
US Independent Albums (Billboard)	39

== See also ==
- The Greatest Gift (mixtape), a 2017 mixtape album by Stevens from sessions for this album.
