= 81355 =

American rap group

- Origin: Indianapolis, U.S.
- Genres: Hip hop; Alternative hip hop
- Years active: 2021–present
- Label: 37d03d
- Members: Oreo Jones; Sirius Blvck; Sedcairn Archives
- Website: 81355ing.com

81355 is an American hip hop group formed in Indianapolis, Indiana in 2021. Its members include Oreo Jones, Sirius Blvck, and Sedcairn Archives. 81355 became Indianapolis' first hip-hop "supergroup" with the release of their first album.

After signing to Justin Vernon, Aaron Dessner, and Bryce Dessner's label 37d03d in 2021, 81355 released their debut album, This Time I'll be of Use which received widespread critical acclaim. The three Indianapolis hip hop veterans recorded the 30 minute long album during the COVID-19 pandemic. The name of the group, 81355, is pronounced "Bless."

The first single released off the album was "Capstone" which included an accompanying music video.
