= Hawkins Bolden =

American artist (1914–2005)

- Bolden with his sculptures
- Born: September 10, 1914; Memphis, Tennessee, U.S.
- Died: 2005 (aged 90–91); Memphis, Tennessee, U.S.
- Known for: Assemblage sculpture
- Movement: Modern Art

Hawkins Bolden (1914–2005) was an American artist known for his "scarecrow" assemblages made from pots, pans, leather belts, rubber hoses and other found materials.

== Early life ==
Bolden was born in the Bailey's Bottom section of Memphis, Tennessee. His childhood passion was baseball. While a baseball accident, though, left him blind at the age of eight, he became adept at working with his hands and making things from what he found in his Memphis neighborhood.

== Career ==
Bolden recalled starting to make faces around 1965 from found objects. His sculptures were made entirely from found material, and in addition to the "scarecrows" for which he is best known, he worked with other forms, assemblages, and tableaus, much of it put in his yard. In 1997, Bolden participated in the show Passionate Visions of the American South opening at the New Orleans Museum of Art. Following his death in 2005, the hundreds of works that filled his yard were dispersed. Bolden was one of four subjects of the 2011 documentary Make, which also included Ike Morgan, Royal Robertson and Judith Scott (artist). His works have sold at various auction houses, including Christies. The American Visionary Art Museum contains permanent collections of his works. Bolden's works are also included in the collections of The Smithsonian Museum of Art, American Visionary Art Museum, The High Museum, the Philadelphia Museum of Art, American Folk Art Museum, John Michael Kohler Arts Center, and the National Gallery of Art.

== Exhibitions ==
- Tactile Visions, Ricco/Maresca Gallery, New York, NY, November 14 - December 7, 1991.
- Hawkins Bolden - Scarecrows, SHRINE, New York, NY, April 9 - May 15, 2021.
- Seated, Institute 193, Lexington, KY, January 12 - March 26, 2022.
- Called To Create: Black Artists of the American South, National Gallery of Art, Washington, DC, September 18, 2022 – March 26, 2023.
