= Leon Borensztein =

American photographer

Leon Borensztein (born 22 May 1947) is an American photographer whose work reflects long-term and in-depth projects. His areas of focus are in psychological portraiture and documentary.

Borensztein has received a Guggenheim Fellowship and his work is included in various public collections. His published books Metamorphosis (1977, with John MacGregor), One is Adam, One is Superman (2004) and American Portraits (2011) document salient moments in the lives of his subjects, and Sharon (2016) documents every stage of the life of his severely disabled daughter.

== Life and work ==
Borensztein was born in Poland. He received a BA in creative art and geography from the University of Haifa, Israel in 1974. He left Israel for the US in 1977 and received an MFA in photography from San Francisco Art Institute in 1980.

The biggest influence on his work has been his life experience. His art is intended to give voice to the unheard and unseen.

Borensztein has worked for The New York Times Magazine, Newsweek, Vogue, Fortune, and others. His work has also appeared in Life and Harper's Bazaar.

Since 1975, Borensztein has held various teaching positions in University of Haifa; University of California, Berkeley; Friends of Photography (Annual Member Workshop); California College of Arts and Crafts, Oakland; and San Francisco Art Institute.

== Publications ==
=== Publications by Borensztein ===
- One is Adam One is Superman: Outsider artists of Creative Growth. San Francisco: Chronicle, 2004. ISBN 9780811845311. With an introduction by Tom di Maria and an essay by John M. MacGregor.
- American Portraits 1979–1989. Portland, OR: Nazraeli, 2011. Edited by Todd Hido. ISBN 978-1-59005-305-8. With an essay by Sandra S. Phillips.
- Portraits ii. Portland, OR: Nazareli, 2012. ISBN 978-1-59005-359-1.
- Sharon. Heidelberg, Germany: Kehrer, 2016. ISBN 978-3-86828-661-8.

=== Publications with others ===
- Metamorphosis. The Fiber Art of Judith Scott. Collaboration with John M. MacGregor. Oakland: Creative Growth Art Center, 1977. ISBN 0-9673160-0-6.
- Witness No. 7. Portland, OR: Nazraeli, 2009. ISBN 978-1590052440. Photographs by Borensztein and Todd Hido, and photographs of images from books by various people that have inspired Hido.

== Award ==
- 1987: Guggenheim Fellowship in Photography from the John Simon Guggenheim Memorial Foundation.

== Collections ==
Borensztein's work is held in the following permanent public collections:

- Art Institute of Chicago, Chicago, IL
- Bibliothèque nationale de France, Paris, France
- Center for Creative Photography, Tucson, AZ
- Centre Nationale de la Photographie, Paris
- Museum of Fine Arts, Houston, TX
- San Francisco Museum of Modern Art, San Francisco, CA
- Jordan Schnitzer Museum of Art, University of Oregon, Eugene, OR
- Museum of Photographic Arts, San Diego, CA
- Tokyo Photographic Art Museum, Tokyo, Japan
- Di rosa Preserve
