= In the Countenance of Kings =

Ballet choreographed by Justin Peck

- Choreographer: Justin Peck
- Music: Sufjan Stevens
- Premiere: April 7, 2016; War Memorial Opera House
- Original ballet company: San Francisco Ballet
- Design: Ellen Warren; Brandon Stirling Baker

In the Countenance of Kings is a ballet choreographed by Justin Peck to music from Sufjan Stevens's The BQE. The ballet was Peck's first ballet made for the San Francisco Ballet, and premiered in 2016 at the War Memorial Opera House.

== Production ==
In the Countenance of Kings is Peck's first work for the San Francisco Ballet and his 28th overall. When Peck made the ballet, he was a soloist and the resident choreographer with the New York City Ballet.

The ballet is set to Sufjan Stevens's The BQE, a suite inspired by the Brooklyn–Queens Expressway (BQE), with the title of the ballet taken from the first movement of the suite. Peck said he made some of his best works to Stevens's music, and found it "very inspiring on a personal level". The score was reorchestrated by Michael P. Atkinson.

The ballet is performed by six principal dancers and a twelve-person corps de ballet. Though it is plotless, the dancers are credited with superhero names, with the female lead dancers as Quantus, Electress and Botanica, the three lead men as The Protagonist, The Foil and The Hero, and the corps de ballet as The School of Thought. These names were from The BQE and came up by Stevens.

The costumes were designed by Ellen Warren and the lighting was by Brandon Stirling Baker.

== Original cast ==
The lead dancers in the original cast are:

- The Protagonist: Joseph Walsh
- Quantus: Dores André
- Electress: Frances Chung
- The Foil: Gennadi Nedvigin
- Botanical: Jennifer Stahl
- The Hero: Luke Ingham

== Performances ==
The San Francisco Ballet premiered In the Countenance of Kings at the War Memorial Opera House on April 7, 2016. The Pacific Northwest Ballet in Seattle debuted it in 2019.

== Short film ==
Before the premiere of In the Countenance of Kings, the San Francisco Ballet released a short film preview, which features dancer Dores André daydream about the ballet following a rehearsal. The film was made by Ezra Hurwitz, during the company's performance season, at an abandoned train station. In the film, the dancers are in sneakers and leotards that are not the ballet's costumes. The company had never done such projects before, and according to Hurwitz, the management was convinced by principal dancers André and Frances Chung to green-light the film.

== Critical reception ==
Allan Ulrich of SFGate called In the Countenance of Kings "the most exhilarating company commission in years." DanceTabs's Claudia Bauer wrote that Peck "refreshes ballet vocabulary with a youthful, urbane sensibility that's more Robbins than it is Balanchine, and specifically calls to mind NY Export: Opus Jazz," and Peck also "devised Countenance with clever structures and cleverer transitions," though the music's "frequent shifts in theme and extremely short arcs, causes the mood to swing too low, too high, too fast."
