= Royal Robertson =

American artist (1930–1997)

- Robertson outside his home (from the documentary Make by Scott Ogden and Malcolm Hearn)
- Born: October 20, 1930; St. Mary Parish, Louisiana, U.S.
- Died: July 5, 1997 (aged 66); Baldwin, Louisiana, U.S.
- Movement: Outsider art Visionary art

Royal Robertson (October 20, 1930 – July 5, 1997), also known as the self-proclaimed Prophet Royal Robertson, was an American outsider artist.

== Early life and marriage ==
Born in St. Mary Parish, Louisiana, on October 20, 1930, Robertson spent almost his entire life in Baldwin, Louisiana. Robertson left school having completed the eighth grade. In his late teens he apprenticed as a sign painter and traveled to the West coast in his early twenties working as a field hand and sign painter. He returned to Louisiana in the 1950s to care for his mother where he continued to work as a sign painter. He married Adell Bren (or Lockett) in 1955 and they had eleven children. Their marriage ended after 19 years when Adell left him for another man, moved to Texas taking their children with her, and became a minister.

== Works ==
Robertson remained in Louisiana after his marriage ended and became a recluse. He was largely scorned by his neighbors and was overcome by misogynistic rage towards his former wife and women in general. Robertson had paranoid schizophrenia and claimed to have had his first vision, a futuristic vision of a spaceship with God as the pilot, when he was fourteen. When his marriage ended he began to record his visions in his imagery and writings. Numerous hallucinatory visions of space travel where aliens predicted the End of Days through complex numerological formulas and warned him about the dangers of adultery and fornication led Robertson to believe that he was a victim of a global female conspiracy. He believed that his ex-wife's betrayal would be the cause of the cataclysmic destruction of humanity, and that his art was divinely sanctioned. According to social anthropologist Frédéric Allamel, Robertson saw himself as a patriarch in search of a new Zion and a prophet whose legacy would consist of his apocryphal work. He identified himself as "Libra Patriarch Prophet Lord Archbishop Apostle Visionary Mystic Psychic Saint Royal Robertson".

=== Materials and themes ===
Robertson worked on materials like poster board and paper or wood using magic markers, tempera paint, colored pencils, ballpoint pens, and glitter. He studied the Bible and there are many references to it in his work together with references to "girlie magazines", comic strips and science fiction. He was preoccupied with numerology and biblical prophecies of the End of Days from the Book of Revelation. Frequent themes included images of aliens and their spaceships, Bible verses and religious references, fire breathing, godzilla-like monsters, snakes, architectural drawings of houses and temples in futuristic cities, superheroes, and portraits of Adell often identified with Jezebel and other Amazon-like "harlots". His colorful drawings often included rambling, judgmental, ranting texts, sometimes in comic book-like speech balloons, about "adulterous whores" and unfaithful spouses. He frequently referenced precise and painful moments in his life, particularly his wife's unfaithfulness to him, and produced calendars chronicling memories of his marriage in short journal notations scribbled in each date's block. Much of his work included images that conveyed a sense of the artist pitted against the forces of evil. His works were often double-sided and when he signed pieces, he would add "Prophet" to the front of his name, or alternatively "Patriarch".

=== Home ===
Robertson's home and yard were decorated with hundreds of his signs, drawings, calendars, and shrines. The exterior was decorated with a variety of painted and rotating signs including warnings that "whores" and "bastards" should stay away and misogynistic messages denouncing "bad" women often addressed to his ex-wife Adell. The interior was decorated with his drawings pinned to every available wall. Many drawings inside his home were of his ex-wife and the interior included a number of shrines dedicated to her. According to Allamel, Robertson developed a "complicated spatial ritualization" before he would allow visitors into his "sacred/profane inner space". His home was destroyed by Hurricane Andrew in August 1992. Two collectors helped him file papers with the federal government to recover from his losses.

=== Exhibitions and collections ===
Robertson's work has been featured in many exhibitions and a number of works are held in permanent collections including the Smithsonian American Art Museum, the Minneapolis Institute of Art, the Mississippi Museum of Art, the University Art Museum, Lafayette, The Brogan Museum, the American Visionary Art Museum and the Art Museum of Southeast Texas.

== Exhibitions ==
Called to Create: Black Artists of the American South, National Gallery of Art, Washington, DC, September 18, 2022 – March 26, 2023, curated by Harry Cooper.

== Death ==
Robertson was found lying unconscious in the backyard of his home in 1997 by his daughter Dinah, where he died suddenly from a heart attack, aged 66.

== Film ==
In 2009, Scott Ogden and Malcolm Hearn produced the documentary Make that examined the lives and art-making techniques of Robertson, Hawkins Bolden, Judith Scott and Ike Morgan.

== In popular culture ==
The title of the 2010 album The Age of Adz by American artist Sufjan Stevens is a reference to the work of Robertson. Robertson's work is used for the cover and interior design of the album, as well as for the supporting tour, where his imagery is animated synchronously with the live music. The album's lyrical content reflects and responds to Robertson's work and circumstances, including themes like "divine revelation, oracles, love, the cosmos, the Apocalypse," according to promotional material for the album from Asthmatic Kitty Records.
