= All Delighted People =

EP by Sufjan Stevens
- Released: August 20, 2010
- Recorded: 2009 and 2010
- Length: 59:15
- Label: Asthmatic Kitty
- Producer: Sufjan Stevens

Sufjan Stevens chronology
The BQE (2009)	All Delighted People (2010)	The Age of Adz (2010)

All Delighted People is an EP by Sufjan Stevens, released online by Asthmatic Kitty Records on August 20, 2010. It is centered around two versions of Stevens' ballad "All Delighted People". According to the official release webpage it is an "homage to the Apocalypse, existential ennui, and Paul Simon's 'Sound of Silence'". It debuted at #48 on the Billboard 200 and jumped to number #27 the week after.

== Critical reception ==
Professional ratings
Aggregate scores
Source	Rating
AnyDecentMusic?	5.3/10
Metacritic	63/100
Review scores
Source	Rating
AllMusic	3/5 stars
Consequence of Sound	2.5/5 stars
Drowned in Sound	(4/10)
The Independent	5/5 stars
NME	(3/10)
No Ripcord	(4/10)
Pitchfork Media	(7.6/10)
PopMatters	(6/10)
Rolling Stone	3/5 stars
Spin	(7/10)

All Delighted People received mostly positive reviews from contemporary music critics. At Metacritic, which assigns a normalized rating out of 100 to reviews from mainstream critics, the album received an average score of 63, based on 12 reviews, which indicates "generally favorable reviews".

Ian Cohen of Pitchfork Media gave the EP a positive review stating, "It isn't the mere existence of Age of Adz that puts this EP in perspective, though-- the electronic sonics of first taste "I Walked" are a blatant sign that we may ultimately have to retire the idea of Sufjan Stevens as a banjo-toting cartographer of the heart and the continental United States going forward. The scrapbook-like cover of All Delighted People makes sense then, as its contents serve as a humble and friendly keepsake, songs that deserve to be heard, but belonging to a chapter in Stevens' artistic livelihood that he needed to close to maintain his vitality."

== Track listing ==
No.	Title	Length
1.	"All Delighted People" (original version)	11:38
2.	"Enchanting Ghost"	3:39
3.	"Heirloom"	2:55
4.	"From the Mouth of Gabriel"	4:03
5.	"The Owl and the Tanager"	6:38
6.	"All Delighted People" (classic rock version)	8:07
7.	"Arnika"	5:13
8.	"Djohariah"	17:02

Vinyl edition

Side A
No.	Title	Length
1.	"All Delighted People" (original version)	11:38
2.	"Enchanting Ghost"	3:39
3.	"From the Mouth of Gabriel"	4:03

Side B
No.	Title	Length
1.	"The Owl and the Tanager"	6:38
2.	"All Delighted People" (classic rock version)	8:07
3.	"Arnika"	5:13

Side C
No.	Title	Length
1.	"Heirloom"	2:55
2.	"Djohariah"	17:02

Side D
No.	Title	Length
1.	"Untitled"	2:47
2.	"Untitled"	1:57
3.	"Untitled"	0:46
4.	"Untitled"	2:25
5.	"Untitled"	1:00
6.	"Untitled"	1:06
7.	"Untitled"	1:01
8.	"Untitled"	0:35
9.	"Untitled"	2:52
10.	"Untitled"	1:00
11.	"Untitled"	3:10

Notes:

- Side D contains piano solos originally recorded as a soundtrack to the 2008 short film Eve, directed by Natalie Portman. No information is contained about these in the vinyl release.

== Charts ==
Chart performance for All Delighted People
Chart (2010)	Peak position
US Billboard 200	27
US Americana/Folk Albums (Billboard)	3
US Independent Albums (Billboard)	5
US Top Rock Albums (Billboard)	7
UK Independent Albums (OCC)	30
