= No Shade in the Shadow of the Cross =

2015 single by Sufjan Stevens

Single by Sufjan Stevens

from the album Carrie & Lowell
- Released: February 16, 2015
- Genre: Folk; lo-fi
- Length: 2:40
- Label: Asthmatic Kitty; Joyful Noise
- Songwriter(s): Sufjan Stevens

Sufjan Stevens singles chronology
"Too Much" (2010)	"No Shade in the Shadow of the Cross" (2015)	"Should Have Known Better" (2015)

Music video
- "No Shade in the Shadow of the Cross" on YouTube

"No Shade in the Shadow of the Cross" is a song by American singer-songwriter and multi-instrumentalist Sufjan Stevens. It is the tenth track and lead single from his seventh studio album, Carrie & Lowell, and was released digitally on February 16, 2015 on Asthmatic Kitty and as a one-track 7" on March 3, 2015 on Joyful Noise Recordings.

== Critical reception ==
"No Shade in the Shadow of the Cross" received very positive reviews from contemporary music critics. The song was chosen upon release as Pitchfork Media's "Best New Track". Jeremy D. Larson stated that,

Once again, Sufjan Stevens is finger-picking and whisper-singing to guide us towards cold moments of solitude and reverence. It's comforting to hear his voice again, like it's inches from the ear. "No Shade in the Shadow of the Cross" seems like a reflexive pendulum swing away from everything his challenging Age of Adz stood for. No more high-concept art statements, just old-fashioned songwriting; a man playing guitar on a stool in the corner of a café. But consider the three elements of this song: his voice, his acoustic guitar, and some white noise underneath. The last one is important. The white noise is not an affected tape hiss, but rather the fan of an air conditioner, running on high, blasting into Stevens' apartment.
