= The BQE (soundtrack) =

Soundtrack album by Sufjan Stevens
- Released: October 20, 2009
- Genres: Avant-garde; electronic; classical
- Length: 40:16
- Label: Asthmatic Kitty
- Producer: Sufjan Stevens

Sufjan Stevens chronology
| Songs for Christmas (2006) | The BQE (2009) | All Delighted People EP (2010) |

Professional ratings
Aggregate scores
| Source | Rating |
|---|---|
| AnyDecentMusic? | 6.9/10 |
| Metacritic | 73/100 |
Review scores
| Source | Rating |
| AllMusic | 3.5/5 stars |
| Drowned in Sound | 7/10 |
| NME | 9/10 |
| Pitchfork | 7.4/10 |
| Slant Magazine | 3.5/5 stars |

The BQE is a mixed-medium artistic exploration of the Brooklyn-Queens Expressway by Sufjan Stevens. The project originally manifested in the form of a live show, performed on November 1–3, 2007. The show consisted of an original film, directed and written by Stevens, accompanied by an orchestra performing a live soundtrack.

The album recording was made after the rehearsals for the show. It was recorded live during a one-day session in Legacy Studios' A509 orchestral suite (since closed and demolished) with most of the group in the same large room together.

A multimedia package of The BQE was released on October 20, 2009. The set consists of a CD of the show's soundtrack, a DVD of Brooklyn-Queen Expressway footage that accompanied the original performance (not a film of the performance itself), a 40-page booklet with liner notes and photos, and a stereoscopic 3D View-Master reel. There is also a limited-edition version that features the soundtrack on 180-gram vinyl and a 40-page BQE-themed comic book starring the show's hula-hooping wonder women, The Hooper Heroes.

Regarding The BQE, Stevens said:

I intended to create a non-personal, non-narrative piece. I tried to reduce my own personal investment as much as possible, and I refused to incorporate one of my strengths, which is the song. I was relinquishing my greatest weapon.

== Ballet ==
Justin Peck's ballet In the Countenance of Kings, made for the San Francisco Ballet, is set to music from The BQE.

== Track listing ==
| No. | Title | Length |
|---|---|---|
| 1. | "Prelude on the Esplanade" | 2:56 |
| 2. | "Introductory Fanfare for the Hooper Heroes" | 1:07 |
| 3. | "Movement I: In the Countenance of Kings" | 5:19 |
| 4. | "Movement II: Sleeping Invader" | 4:34 |
| 5. | "Interlude I: Dream Sequence in Subi Circumnavigation" | 3:33 |
| 6. | "Movement III: Linear Tableau with Intersecting Surprise" | 4:09 |
| 7. | "Movement IV: Traffic Shock" | 3:24 |
| 8. | "Movement V: Self-Organizing Emergent Patterns" | 3:45 |
| 9. | "Interlude II: Subi Power Waltz" | 0:28 |
| 10. | "Interlude III: Invisible Accidents" | 0:54 |
| 11. | "Movement VI: Isorhythmic Night Dance with Interchanges" | 3:17 |
| 12. | "Movement VII (Finale): The Emperor of Centrifuge" | 3:51 |
| 13. | "Postlude: Critical Mass" | 2:59 |
| Total length: | | 40:16 |

DVD-only bonus track
| No. | Title | Length |
|---|---|---|
| 14. | "The Sleeping Red Wolves" | 4:23 |
| Total length: | | 44:39 |

== Personnel ==
Production

- Alejandro Venguer, assisted by Jeff Kirby and Tyler Van Dalen – recording, legacy studios, New York City
- Casey Foubert, James McAlister, and Sufjan Stevens – additional recording, Sufjan's office in Brooklyn
- Sufjan Stevens – mixing
- Lisa Moran – production management
- Michael Atkinson – music editing, copyist

Performing artists

- Tim Albright – trombone
- Hideaki Aomori – clarinet
- Mat Fieldes – upright bass
- Casey Foubert – electric guitar
- Josh Frank – trumpet
- Alan Hampton – upright bass
- Marla Hansen – viola, vocals
- Jay Hassler – bass clarinet, clarinet
- Maria Bella Jeffers – cello
- Ben Lanz – trombone
- Olivier Manchon – violin
- Rob Moose – violin
- Sato Moughalian – flute, piccolo
- Damian Primis – bassoon
- Theo Primis – French horn
- Joey Redhage – cello
- Kyle Resnick – trumpet
- Yuuki Matthews – bass, beats
- Beth Meyers – viola
- James McAlister – drums, percussion, drum programming, sequencing, synthesizers, sound effects, etc.
- Matt Moran – drums, percussion
- Arthur Sato – oboe
- Alex Sopp – flute, alto flute, piccolo
- Hiroko Taguchi – violin
- Amie Weiss – violin
- Sufjan Stevens – "everything else"
- Michael Atkinson – conductor

BQE Film

- Anastasia-Dyan Pridlides – botanica
- Elaine Tian – quantus
- Lindsay Brickel – electress
- Sufjan Stevens – direction, cinematography, editing
- Reuben Kleiner – cinematography, editing
- Malcolm Hearn – editing
- Bryant Fisher and Blink Digital – post-production

Packaging

- Denny Renshaw – photography
- Anastasia-Dyan Pridlides – botanica
- Elaine Tian – quantus
- Lindsay Brickel – electress
- Stephen Halker – bailey
- Virginia Bradley Linzee – makeup
- Belinda Martin – wardrobe
- Caroline McAlister – costume design, costumes
- Sufjan Stevens – photography, layout, design, illustrations

"Hooper Heroes" Comic Book/Stereoscopic Reel

- Sufjan Stevens – story, writing
- Stephen Halker – story, penciling, inking, lettering, coloring
- Heidi Cho – coloring
- David Min – coloring
- Matt Loux – cover watercolour
- Christian Ackler – cover masthead

== Charts ==
Chart performance for The BQE
| Chart (2009) | Peak position |
|---|---|
| US Billboard 200 | 171 |
| US Independent Albums (Billboard) | 18 |
| UK Independent Albums (Official Charts) | 22 |
