= Creative Growth Art Center =

Nonprofit arts organization based in Oakland, California

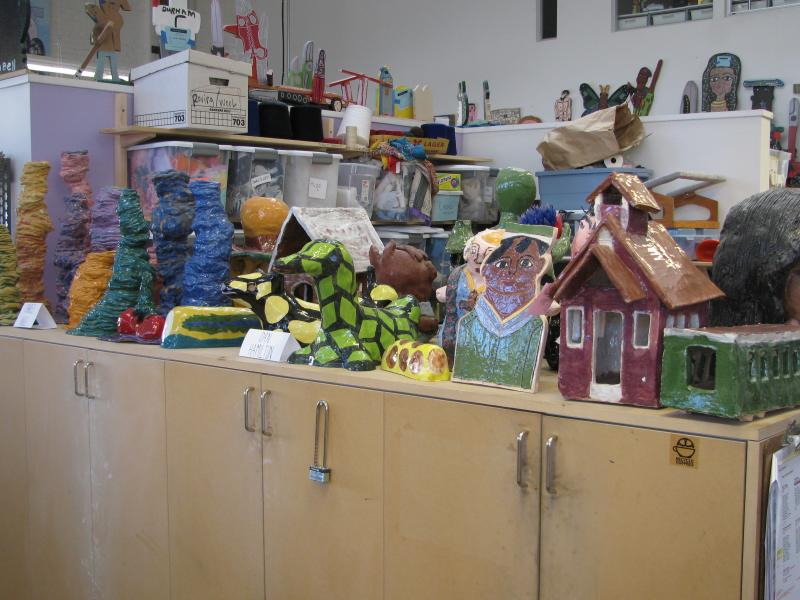
- Ceramic projects at Creative Growth Art Center
- Formation: 1973; 53 years ago
- Founder: Florence Ludins-Katz, Elias Katz
- Founded at: Berkeley, California, US
- Type: Non-profit
- Location: 355 24th Street, Oakland, California, US
- Coordinates: 37.813078°N 122.264202°W
- Members: approximately 160
- Website: creativegrowth.org

Creative Growth Art Center is a nonprofit arts organization, based in Oakland, California, that provides studios, supplies, and gallery space to artists with developmental, mental, and physical disabilities. It is one of the oldest and largest art centers for people with disabilities in the world. It is currently located at 355 24th Street in Oakland, California.

== About ==
The director of the program since 2000 is Tom di Maria, who previously worked as the assistant director at Berkeley Art Museum and Pacific Film Archive. Roughly 160 artists work at the center.

== History ==
In 1973, the husband and wife pair of Florence Ludins-Katz and Elias Katz founded Creative Growth in their garage in Berkeley. Ludins-Katz was an artist and Katz was a psychologist. The center moved in 1978 to a former auto-repair shop in downtown Oakland, where it currently operates. Between the 1950s and 1960s, the mass closure of psychiatric hospitals in California caused many patients to be deinstitutionalized. And in 1967, the Lanterman–Petris–Short Act was signed and it blocked involuntary hospitalization for many former patients. There were not enough accommodations made after the release of the former patients and many ended up homeless or imprisoned. The Creative Growth Art Center was founded primarily with the goal of supporting former state-hospital patients with therapeutic support, artistic/creative support, and vocational training.

Creative Growth was featured in Elle Decor (October 1990 issue) in an article tilted "Aimed Straight From The Heart" written by Susan Subtle. Subtle reviews the organization and compares the style of art made at Creative Growth to outsider, primitive, naive, brut, and early-American folk art.

In 2010, Matthew Higgs, Director/Chief Curator at White Columns, curated a show titled "Everyone!" that featured over 130 works made by Creative Growth artists and included each and every artist currently enrolled in the studio program.

In 2018, a segment in the ninth season of television series Art21, talks to some of the artists and administrators involved with Creative Growth.

=== Beyond Trend (2010 – present) fashion show ===
Beyond Trend is Creative Growth's runway extravaganza that started in 2010 as a small in-gallery showing of fashion. The 2018 show, its largest yet, opened at the 1,250-seat Scottish Rite Center, where it was chaired by Paper magazine co-founder Kim Hastreiter and Target Chief Creative Officer Todd Waterbury.

== Notable artists ==
Thousands of artists have come through Creative Growth's doors over the years and a number have reach national recognition. Creative Growth artists have had major exhibitions at the National Gallery of Art, Washington DC (with artist Judith Scott, 2018); Venice Biennale (with artists Dan Miller and Judith Scott, 2017); Brooklyn Museum (Judith Scott, 2015); Museum of Modern Art (Dan Miller, 2008); and White Columns (with artist William Scott, 2009, 2006).
