= Silver & Gold (Sufjan Stevens album) =

Box set by Sufjan Stevens
- Released: November 13, 2012
- Recorded: 2006–2012
- Genres: Christmas; experimental
- Length: 161:36
- Label: Asthmatic Kitty
- Producer: Sufjan Stevens

Sufjan Stevens chronology
The Age of Adz (2010)	Silver & Gold (2012)	Chopped and Scrooged (2012)

Singles from Silver & Gold
- 1. "Christmas Unicorn" Released: October 2, 2012

Professional ratings
Aggregate scores
Source	Rating
AnyDecentMusic?	7.4/10
Metacritic	76/100
Review scores
Source	Rating
Consequence of Sound	3/5 stars
Paste	7.5/10
Pitchfork	7.8/10
PopMatters	7/10

Silver & Gold: Songs for Christmas, Vols. 6–10 is a five-EP box set of Christmas-related songs and carols recorded by Sufjan Stevens between 2006 and 2012. It is a follow-up to Songs for Christmas, which was released six years prior. On October 2, 2012, it was announced that Stevens would release Silver & Gold on November 13, 2012, in digital format, CD and LP boxset. On October 24, 2012, a claymation music video, animated by Lee Hardcastle, was released for "Mr. Frosty Man".

== Reception ==
The album has received mostly positive reviews from critics, with Pitchfork giving it a 7.8 out of 10. At Metacritic, which assigns a normalized rating out of 100 to reviews from mainstream critics, the album has received an average score of 76, based on 13 reviews, indicating "generally favorable reviews".

== Track listing ==
Gloria: Songs for Christmas, Vol. VI (recorded December 2006)
No.	Title	Lyrics	Music	Length
1.	"Silent Night"	Joseph Mohr	Franz Xaver Gruber	2:26
2.	"Lumberjack Christmas / No One Can Save You from Christmases Past"	Sufjan Stevens	Aaron Dessner, Bryce Dessner, Sufjan Stevens	3:22
3.	"Coventry Carol" (featuring Marla Hansen)	Traditional	Traditional	2:54
4.	"The Midnight Clear"	Sufjan Stevens	Aaron Dessner, Bryce Dessner, Sufjan Stevens	2:49
5.	"Carol of St. Benjamin the Bearded One"	Sufjan Stevens	Aaron Dessner, Bryce Dessner, Sufjan Stevens	3:32
6.	"Go Nightly Cares"	Instrumental	John Dowland	1:44
7.	"Barcarola (You Must Be a Christmas Tree)"	Sufjan Stevens	Aaron Dessner, Bryce Dessner, Sufjan Stevens	7:03
8.	"Auld Lang Syne"	Robert Burns	Traditional	1:35
Total length:				22:36

I Am Santa's Helper: Songs for Christmas, Vol. VII (recorded December 2007)
No.	Title	Lyrics	Music	Length
1.	"Christ the Lord is Born"	Sufjan Stevens	Sufjan Stevens	0:49
2.	"Christmas Woman"	Sufjan Stevens	Sufjan Stevens	5:33
3.	"Break Forth O Beauteous Heavenly Light"	J.S. Bach	Johann Schop	1:09
4.	"Happy Family Christmas"	Sufjan Stevens	Sufjan Stevens	1:23
5.	"Jingle Bells"	James Lord Pierpont	James Lord Pierpont	1:19
6.	"Mysteries of the Christmas Mist!"	Instrumental	Sufjan Stevens	2:10
7.	"Lift Up Your Heads Ye Mighty Gates"	Georg Weissel	Thomas Williams	1:20
8.	"We Wish You a Merry Christmas"	Traditional	Traditional	1:16
9.	"Ah Holy Jesus"	Johann Heermann	Johann Crüger	2:42
10.	"Behold! The Birth of Man, the Face of Glory"	Instrumental	Sufjan Stevens	1:09
11.	"Ding-a-ling-a-ring-a-ling"	Sufjan Stevens	Sufjan Stevens	1:50
12.	"How Shall I Fitly Meet Thee?"	Instrumental	J.S. Bach	2:09
13.	"Mr. Frosty Man"	Sufjan Stevens	Sufjan Stevens	1:50
14.	"Make Haste to See the Baby"	Instrumental	Sufjan Stevens	1:23
15.	"Ah Holy Jesus" (with reed organ)	Johann Crüger	Johann Crüger	1:29
16.	"Hark! The Herald Angels Sing"	Charles Wesley	Felix Mendelssohn	1:51
17.	"Morning"	Instrumental	Amos Pilsbury	2:28
18.	"Idumea"	Charles Wesley	Ananias Davisson	3:50
19.	"Eternal Happiness or Woe"	Instrumental	Sufjan Stevens	1:23
20.	"Ah Holy Jesus" (a capella)	Johann Crüger	Johann Crüger	1:00
21.	"I Am Santa's Helper"	Sufjan Stevens	Sufjan Stevens	1:52
22.	"Ma'oz Tzur' (Rock of Ages)"	Traditional Jewish Hymn	Traditional Jewish Hymn	0:42
23.	"Even the Earth Will Perish and the Universe Give Way"	Instrumental	Sufjan Stevens	2:01
Total length:				42:38

Christmas Infinity Voyage: Songs for Christmas, Vol. VIII (recorded December 2008, 2011–2012) (Note: Originally recorded in December 2008 as Astral Inter Planet Space Captain Christmas Infinity Voyage: Songs for Christmas, Vol. VIII; box set version re-recorded and expanded in 2011–2012.)
No.	Title	Lyrics	Music	Length
1.	"Angels We Have Heard on High" (based on the original hymn)	Sufjan Stevens	Sufjan Stevens	4:04
2.	"Do You Hear What I Hear?"	Noël Regney	Gloria Shayne	9:14
3.	"Christmas in the Room"	Sufjan Stevens	Sufjan Stevens	4:23
4.	"It Came Upon the Midnight Clear"	Edmund Sears	Richard Storrs Willis	0:48
5.	"Good King Wenceslas"	John Mason Neale	Traditional	4:18
6.	"Alphabet St."	Prince	Prince	1:36
7.	"Particle Physics"	Sufjan Stevens	Sufjan Stevens	1:04
8.	"Joy to the World"	Isaac Watts	Lowell Mason	5:25
9.	"The Child with the Star on His Head"	Sufjan Stevens	Sufjan Stevens	15:30
Total length:				46:22

Let It Snow: Songs for Christmas, Vol. IX (recorded December 2009)
No.	Title	Lyrics	Music	Length
1.	"I'll Be Home for Christmas"	Kim Gannon, Buck Ram	Walter Kent	3:22
2.	"Santa Claus Is Coming to Town"	Haven Gillespie	J. Fred Coots	2:32
3.	"The Sleigh in the Moon" (featuring Cat Martino)	Cat Martino	Cat Martino	1:44
4.	"Sleigh Ride"	Mitchell Parish	Leroy Anderson	2:28
5.	"Ave Maria" (featuring Cat Martino)	Traditional	Franz Schubert	2:09
6.	"X-Mas Spirit Catcher"	Sufjan Stevens	Sufjan Stevens	3:31
7.	"Let It Snow! Let It Snow! Let It Snow!"	Sammy Cahn	Jule Styne	2:17
8.	"A Holly Jolly Christmas"	Johnny Marks	Johnny Marks	2:27
9.	"Christmas Face" (featuring Sebastian Krueger)	Sebastian Krueger	Sebastian Krueger	0:40
Total length:				21:10

Christmas Unicorn: Songs for Christmas, Vol. X (recorded December 2010)
No.	Title	Lyrics	Music	Length
1.	"Have Yourself a Merry Little Christmas"	Ralph Blane	Hugh Martin	3:42
2.	"It Came Upon a Midnight Clear"	Edmund Sears	Richard Storrs Willis	0:40
3.	"Up on the Housetop" (featuring Vesper Stamper)	Benjamin Hanby	Benjamin Hanby	4:21
4.	"Angels We Have Heard on High" (traditional French carol)	Traditional	Traditional	0:52
5.	"We Need a Little Christmas"	Jerry Herman	Jerry Herman	2:03
6.	"Happy Karma Christmas"	Sufjan Stevens	Sufjan Stevens	3:36
7.	"We Three Kings"	Instrumental	John Henry Hopkins Jr.	0:52
8.	"Justice Delivers Its Death" (based on the song "Silver & Gold" by Johnny Marks)	Johnny Marks	Johnny Marks	3:16
9.	"Christmas Unicorn" (includes "Love Will Tear Us Apart", by Joy Division)	Sufjan Stevens, Ian Curtis, Peter Hook, Stephen Morris, and Bernard Sumner	Sufjan Stevens, Ian Curtis, Peter Hook, Stephen Morris, and Bernard Sumner	12:28
Total length:				31:50

== Charts ==
=== Weekly charts ===
Weekly chart performance for Silver & Gold
Chart (2012)	Peak position
US Billboard 200	70
US Top Alternative Albums (Billboard)	14
US Americana/Folk Albums (Billboard)	5
US Top Holiday Albums (Billboard)	16
US Independent Albums (Billboard)	11
US Top Rock Albums (Billboard)	23

=== Year-end charts ===
Year-end chart performance for Silver & Gold
Chart (2013)	Peak position
US Americana/Folk Albums (Billboard)	36

== In popular culture ==
Chicago radio personality Lin Brehmer mentions the Christmas unicorn in episode of the "Review" episode of The Bear TV series. "Christmas Unicorn" is a 12-minute, 28-second song, the last track on the box set. Stevens wore a balloon-based Christmas unicorn costume to perform the song at a December 2012 concert at the Metro Chicago concert venue. The song examines "the many conflicting aspects of Christmas—Christian holiday, pagan heresy, celebration of crass materialism (to name a few)." Stevens says he hates Christmas. The Silver & Gold box set is a series of Christmas albums he made for his friends over a period of years.
