= Should Have Known Better =

2015 single by Sufjan Stevens

Single by Sufjan Stevens

from the album Carrie & Lowell
- Released: March 11, 2015
- Genre: Folk; electronic
- Length: 5:07
- Label: Asthmatic Kitty
- Songwriter: Sufjan Stevens

Sufjan Stevens singles chronology
"No Shade in the Shadow of the Cross" (2015)	"Should Have Known Better" (2015)	"Carrie & Lowell" (2015)

Music video
- "Should Have Known Better" on YouTube

"Should Have Known Better" is a song by American singer-songwriter and multi-instrumentalist Sufjan Stevens. It is the second track and second single from his seventh studio album, Carrie & Lowell, and was released digitally on March 11, 2015 on Asthmatic Kitty. A one-track promotional CD was later released on Asthmatic Kitty but was not available for sale.

== Critical reception ==
"Should Have Known Better" received positive reviews from contemporary music critics. The song was chosen upon release as Pitchfork Media's "Best New Track". Jeremy Gordon stated that, " 'Should Have Known Better' takes us back to the beginning he remembers, where Carrie leaves him in a video store at the age of 'three, maybe four.' In a hushed voice, he sings like he's clinging onto a blanket for warmth as he fixates on the black shroud that enveloped him in the wake of her absence, muting his ability to transparently express himself." Gordon continues, "But halfway through, an uplifting electric keyboard line kicks in; a subtle percussive note steadily taps out a reminder to keep going; his voice shakes off the ice and forms a chorus with itself, flowering into something hopeful. Sufjan flips the melody from the black shroud into a tender lyric about shoving aside his fear, discovering an oasis of perspective when he looks to his brother's newborn daughter and sees his mother in her face. When he sings 'nothing can be changed,' he doesn't sound resigned, but ready to look forward. It's the dawn at the end of a long night, a prayer that past traumas might be healed by a beautiful present."

== Certifications ==
Certifications for "Should Have Known Better"
Region	Certification	Certified units/sales
United States (RIAA)	Gold	500,000^{‡}
^{‡} Sales+streaming figures based on certification alone.
