= Oreo Jones =

American rapper and producer from Indiana

- Born: Sean Michael Smith
- Origin: Indiana, United States
- Genres: Rap; Emcee; experimental
- Years active: 2012–present
- Labels: Near Mint; This is Meru; Rad Summer
- Website: oreojones.com

Sean Michael Smith, known professionally as Oreo Jones is an American rapper, songwriter, emcee, and radio station manager. He has released three full-length albums, two EPs, and two collaborative albums, one with Sirius Blvck, and the other, 81355, as a trio, with Sirius Blvck and David Moose Adamson. 81355 released its first album This Time I'll Be of Use in 2021. Jones also works with the Big Car Collaborative as the station manager for WQRT. He has also been an Afrofuturistic Punk band White Moms. In 2019 Jones release the album "Through The Depths of Hell I Picked Up The Phone," under the name Michael Raintree. In 2015 Jones created Chreece, the first all day hip-hop festival in Indianapolis.

== Discography ==
=== Albums ===
- Betty (Rad Summer, 2012)
- Cash for Gold (Chreece Records, 2016)
- Through The Depths of Hell I Picked Up The Phone (Rad Summer, 2019)
- Unconcerned (Near Mint, 2020)

=== EPs ===
- Oreo Jones and Friends (Rad Summer, 2011)
- The Delicious EP (Rad Summer, 2010)

=== Music videos ===
- "Barcelona" (2016)
- "Chapter One: Goldust" (2016)
- "Nosebleeder" (2019)
