= Songs for Christmas (Sufjan Stevens album) =

Box set by Sufjan Stevens
- Released: November 21, 2006
- Recorded: 2001–2006
- Genre: Christmas
- Length: 123:10
- Label: Asthmatic Kitty
- Producer: Sufjan Stevens

Sufjan Stevens chronology
The Avalanche (2006)	Songs for Christmas (2006)	The BQE (2009)

Professional ratings
Review scores
Source	Rating
AllMusic	4/5 stars
Robert Christgau	(choice cut)
Drowned in Sound	9/10
Pitchfork	7.5/10

Songs for Christmas (stylized as Sufjan Stevens Presents Songs for Christmas on the cover) is a box set of five separate EPs of Christmas-related songs and carols recorded by independent musician Sufjan Stevens between 2001 and 2006. The EPs had been given as gifts to friends and family of Stevens over the past six years, except for 2004 when he was too busy recording the Illinois album. Though the first three EPs had already been available on Sufjan Stevens-related fansites for several years, Songs for Christmas is the first official release of these EPs. Most of the tracks are versions of traditional Christmas songs, with a number of original compositions such as "Sister Winter" and "Star of Wonder". Sufjan Stevens has developed a reputation for being a devoted Christian and many of the songs he chose for inclusion on Songs for Christmas are religious in nature, including his original compositions.

The box set includes a poster of Sufjan Stevens, an animated short for "Put the Lights on the Tree" by Tom Eaton, an essay by Rick Moody, two original short stories by Stevens, stickers, comics and a sing-a-long book for all five discs.

During Stevens' international tour in the later half of 2006, he regularly performed the original song "That Was the Worst Christmas Ever!" while releasing inflatable Santas into the audience for fun.

Songs for Christmas was generally well received by music critics.

Stevens released a follow-up, Silver and Gold: Songs for Christmas, Vols. 6-10, in November 2012, which contains a further 58 original and traditional songs.

== Track listing ==
Noel: Songs for Christmas, Vol. I (recorded December 2001)
No.	Title	Lyrics	Music	Length
1.	"Silent Night"	Joseph Mohr	Franz Xaver Gruber	0:47
2.	"O Come, O Come Emmanuel"	Traditional	Traditional	3:59
3.	"We're Goin to the Country!"	Sufjan Stevens	Sufjan Stevens	2:19
4.	"Lo! How a Rose E'er Blooming!"	Traditional	Anonymous	3:25
5.	"It's Christmas! Let's Be Glad!"	Sufjan Stevens	Sufjan Stevens	1:58
6.	"Holy Holy, etc"		John Bacchus Dykes	0:39
7.	"Amazing Grace"	John Newton	Traditional	4:00
Total length:				17:07

Hark!: Songs for Christmas, Vol. 2 (recorded November 2002) (Note: Additional recordings in June 2006.)
No.	Title	Lyrics	Music	Length
1.	"Angels We Have Heard on High"		Traditional	0:47
2.	"Put the Lights on the Tree"	Sufjan Stevens	Sufjan Stevens	1:50
3.	"Come Thou Fount of Every Blessing"	Robert Robinson	Robert Robinson	4:45
4.	"I Saw Three Ships"	Traditional	Edward S. Barnes	2:36
5.	"Only at Christmas Time"	Sufjan Stevens	Sufjan Stevens	2:18
6.	"Once in Royal David's City"	Cecil Frances Alexander	Henry Gauntlett	3:45
7.	"Hark! The Herald Angels Sing!"	Charles Wesley, George Whitefield	Felix Mendelssohn	0:49
8.	"What Child is This Anyway?"	William Chatterton Dix	Traditional	6:51
9.	"Bring a Torch, Jeanette, Isabella"	Nicolas Saboly	Marc-Antoine Charpentier	1:32
Total length:				25:13

Ding! Dong!: Songs for Christmas, Vol. III (recorded December 2003)
No.	Title	Lyrics	Music	Length
1.	"O Come, O Come Emmanuel"	Traditional	Traditional	1:03
2.	"Come On! Let's Boogey to the Elf Dance!"	Sufjan Stevens	Sufjan Stevens	3:50
3.	"We Three Kings"	John Henry Hopkins	John Henry Hopkins	3:05
4.	"O Holy Night"	Placide Cappeau	Adolphe Adam	3:34
5.	"That Was the Worst Christmas Ever!"	Sufjan Stevens	Sufjan Stevens	2:52
6.	"Ding! Dong!"		Sufjan Stevens	0:56
7.	"All the King's Horns"	Sufjan Stevens	Sufjan Stevens	2:59
8.	"The Friendly Beasts"	Traditional	Traditional	3:41
Total length:				22:10

Joy: Songs for Christmas, Vol. IV (recorded December 2005)
No.	Title	Lyrics	Music	Length
1.	"The Little Drummer Boy"	Katherine Kennicott Davis	Katherine Kennicott Davis	3:44
2.	"Away in a Manger"	Martin Luther	Charles H. Gabriel	2:54
3.	"Hey Guys! It's Christmas Time!"	Sufjan Stevens	Sufjan Stevens	4:41
4.	"The First Noel"	Traditional	Traditional	0:53
5.	"Did I Make You Cry on Christmas? (Well, You Deserved It!)"	Sufjan Stevens	Sufjan Stevens	3:22
6.	"The Incarnation"		Sufjan Stevens	2:23
7.	"Joy to the World"	Isaac Watts	Lowell Mason	4:21
Total length:				22:19

Peace: Songs for Christmas, Vol. V (recorded June 2006) (Note: Stevens didn't produce a Christmas album in 2004 as he was busy working on Illinois. In June 2006 he decided to record an extra album in order to compensate for the missing one.)
No.	Title	Lyrics	Music	Length
1.	"Once in Royal David's City"	Cecil Frances Alexander	Henry Gauntlett	2:01
2.	"Get Behind Me, Santa!"	Sufjan Stevens	Sufjan Stevens	3:49
3.	"Jingle Bells"		James Pierpont	0:36
4.	"Christmas in July"	Sufjan Stevens	Sufjan Stevens	3:17
5.	"Lo! How a Rose E'er Blooming"	Traditional	Traditional	1:46
6.	"Jupiter Winter"	Sufjan Stevens	Sufjan Stevens	3:51
7.	"Sister Winter"	Sufjan Stevens	Sufjan Stevens	5:05
8.	"O Come, O Come Emmanuel"	Traditional	Traditional	1:06
9.	"Star of Wonder"	Sufjan Stevens	Sufjan Stevens	7:08
10.	"Holy, Holy, Holy"	Reginald Heber	John Bacchus Dykes	3:50
11.	"The Winter Solstice"		Sufjan Stevens	3:34
Total length:				36:03

== Charts ==
Chart performance for Songs for Christmas
Chart (2006)	Peak position
US Billboard 200	122
US Independent Albums (Billboard)	3
US Top Holiday Albums (Billboard)	7

Chart (2018)	Peak position
Latvian Albums (LaIPA)	19
