= Turning (2012 film) =

Documentary musical art film

- Theatrical release poster
- Directed by: Charles Atlas
- Produced by: Vibeke Vogel
- Starring: Anohni (f.k.a. Antony Hegarty)
- Cinematography: Gavin Elder
- Edited by: Åsa Mossberg
- Music by: Antony and the Johnsons
- Distributed by: Bullitt Film, Turning Film LLC
- Release dates: July 2012 (New Horizon); November 11, 2014 (DVD)
- Running time: 78 minutes

Turning, is a documentary musical art film made by video artist Charles Atlas in collaboration with British-American artist Anohni and her band Antony and the Johnsons.

== Synopsis ==
The film focuses on 13 New York City-based women who appeared with Antony and the Johnsons in the band's European tour in the Autumn of 2006. During the concert, each subject rotated slowly on a turntable platform on stage, her features blown up and transfigured on a screen behind Anohni and her band, then known as Antony and the Johnsons. Atlas incorporated the 13 personalities in the film and music through candid shots and playful banter to define his picturesque subjects on screen. The concert climaxed with projections of a video of late trans activist Marsha P. Johnson, the band's namesake.

The film pairs a band performance with a video backdrop of superimpositions and time-delay effects. The video uses "13 remarkable women" in the songwriter's words who stand on a revolving platform to the side of the band each with a static pose for the length of a song, staring down the camera in close-up as Charles Atlas superimposes shots from different angles and applies various camera effects.

== Performers ==
- Johanna Constantine
- Catrina Delapena
- Honey Dijon
- Eliza Douglas
- Connie Fleming
- Joey Gabriel
- Joie Iacono
- Stacey Mark
- Nomi
- Kembra Pfahler
- Morisane Sunny Shiroma
- Julia Yasuda

== Musicians ==
- Anohni – vocals, piano
- Maxim Moston – violin
- Jeff Langston – bass
- Rob Moose – guitar, violin
- Julia Kent – cello
- Parker Kindred – drums
- Thomas Bartlett – piano
- Christian Biegai – horns
- Will Holshouser – accordion

== Soundtrack ==
Turning

Soundtrack album by Antony and the Johnsons
- Released: 11 November 2014
- Length: 76:46
- Label: Secretly Canadian

Antony and the Johnsons chronology
| Cut the World (2012) | Turning (2014) | My Back Was a Bridge for You to Cross (2023) |

Professional ratings
Aggregate scores
| Source | Rating |
|---|---|
| Metacritic | 77/100 |
Review scores
| Source | Rating |
| AllMusic | 4/5 stars |
| Clash | 6/10 |
| The Irish Times | 3/5 stars |
| Loud and Quiet | 8/10 |
| NME | 7/10 |
| Pitchfork Media | 7.3/10 |
| PopMatters | 8/10 |
| Record Collector | 4/5 stars |
| Rolling Stone | 3.5/5 stars |
| Under the Radar | 7.5/10 stars |

The soundtrack was recorded at the Barbican Centre, London, on 4–5 November 2006, with all music composed and arranged by Anohni and performed by Antony and the Johnsons. It was officially released on 11 November 2014 by the record label Secretly Canadian.

All tracks are written by Antony and the Johnsons.

Turning
| No. | Title | Original album | Length |
|---|---|---|---|
| 1. | "Everything Is New" | Swanlights | 4:49 |
| 2. | "My Lord My Love" | Thank You for Your Love (EP) | 3:18 |
| 3. | "Cripple and the Starfish" | Antony and the Johnsons | 5:15 |
| 4. | "For Today I Am a Boy" | I Am a Bird Now | 3:32 |
| 5. | "Where Is My Power?" | Epilepsy Is Dancing (single) | 5:31 |
| 6. | "Spiralling" | I Am a Bird Now | 3:57 |
| 7. | "Find the Rhythm of Your Love" | Swanlights (EP) | 6:02 |
| 8. | "I Fell in Love with a Dead Boy" | I Fell in Love with a Dead Boy (EP) | 4:28 |
| 9. | "Bird Gerhl" | I Am a Bird Now | 3:22 |
| 10. | "Kiss My Name" | The Crying Light | 4:09 |
| 11. | "Daylight and the Sun" | The Crying Light | 5:43 |
| 12. | "One Dove" | The Crying Light | 6:28 |
| 13. | "Hope There's Someone" | I Am a Bird Now | 4:42 |
| 14. | "Twilight" | Antony and the Johnsons | 5:57 |
| 15. | "You Are My Sister" | I Am a Bird Now | 4:14 |
| 16. | "Whose Are These" | Whose Are These / Tears Tears Tears (single) | 2:48 |
| 17. | "Tears Tears Tears" | Whose Are These / Tears Tears Tears (single) | 2:31 |
| Total length: | | | 76:46 |

+ Digital booklet

=== Charts ===
| Chart (2014) | Peak; position |
|---|---|
| Belgian Albums (Ultratop Flanders) | 67 |
| Belgian Albums (Ultratop Wallonia) | 100 |
| Dutch Albums (Album Top 100) | 70 |
| French Albums (SNEP) | 146 |
