= Cut the World =

Live album by Antony and the Johnsons
- Released: 7 August 2012
- Recorded: 2–3 September 2011
- Venue: Koncerthuset (Copenhagen, Denmark)
- Genre: Art pop, chamber pop, baroque pop
- Length: 60:42
- Label: Rough Trade
- Producer: Karl Bjerre Skibsted

Antony and the Johnsons chronology
Swanlights (2010)	Cut the World (2012)	Turning (2014)

Cut the World is a live album by Antony and the Johnsons, recorded in Copenhagen and released in August 2012.

In 2012 it was awarded a double silver certification from the Independent Music Companies Association, which indicated sales of at least 40,000 copies throughout Europe.

== Reception ==
Professional ratings
Aggregate scores
Source	Rating
Metacritic	82/100
Review scores
Source	Rating
AllMusic	4.5/5 stars
The A.V. Club	B+
Drowned in Sound	8/10
The Irish Times	5/5 stars
Mojo	4/5 stars
musicOMH	4/5 stars
NME	8/10
Pitchfork	8.1/10
PopMatters	9/10
The Telegraph	5/5 stars

Cut the World received wide acclaim from contemporary music critics. At Metacritic, which assigns a normalized rating out of 100 to reviews from mainstream critics, the album received an average score of 82, based on 31 reviews, which indicates "universal acclaim".

== Track listing ==
All tracks are written by Anohni.

No.	Title	Original album	Length
1.	"Cut the World"		4:19
2.	"Future Feminism"		7:35
3.	"Cripple and the Starfish"	Antony and the Johnsons	5:32
4.	"You Are My Sister"	I Am a Bird Now	4:20
5.	"Swanlights"	Swanlights	7:18
6.	"Epilepsy Is Dancing"	The Crying Light	2:57
7.	"Another World"	The Crying Light	5:26
8.	"Kiss My Name"	The Crying Light	4:07
9.	"I Fell in Love with a Dead Boy"	I Fell in Love with a Dead Boy (EP)	4:51
10.	"Rapture"	Antony and the Johnsons	4:47
11.	"The Crying Light"	The Crying Light	3:21
12.	"Twilight"	Antony and the Johnsons	6:09
Total length:			60:42

- The title track "Cut the World" is a new song from Anohni that was made for the play The Life and Death of Marina Abramović directed by Robert Wilson and starring Anohni, Marina Abramović and Willem Dafoe.
- "Future Feminism" is a spoken word track where Anohni "discusses [her] ideas in a speech [she] made during one of the concerts. Addressing the effects of patriarchy on the global ecology, Anohni explores the possibility of shifting towards feminine systems of governance in a gesture to restore our world."

== Personnel ==
Credits adapted from Cut the World album liner notes.

Antony and the Johnsons

- Antony Hegarty – vocals, arranger
- Thomas Bartlett – piano
- Rob Moose – arranger, conductor
- Maxim Moston – arranger

Additional

- Greg Calbi – mastering
- Danish National Chamber Orchestra – orchestra
- Erik Heide – first violin
- Tatjana Kandel – orchestra artistic manager
- Inez van Lamsweerde and Vinoodh Matadin – photography
- Jens Langkilde – recording technician
- Shaun MacDonald – administration
- Nico Muhly – arranger
- Daniel Murphy – layout
- Ossian Ryner – engineer, mixing
- Karl Bjerre Skibsted – producer
- Robert Wilson – director (1)

== Charts ==
Chart (2012)	Peak position
Austrian Albums (Ö3 Austria)	24
Belgian Albums (Ultratop Flanders)	8
Belgian Albums (Ultratop Wallonia)	38
Danish Albums (Hitlisten)	31
Dutch Albums (Album Top 100)	2
French Albums (SNEP)	20
German Albums (Offizielle Top 100)	27
Irish Albums (IRMA)	22
Irish Independent Albums (IRMA)	4
Italian Albums (FIMI)	25
Norwegian Albums (VG-lista)	11
Scottish Albums (OCC)	44
Spanish Albums (Promusicae)	10
Swedish Albums (Sverigetopplistan)	28
Swiss Albums (Schweizer Hitparade)	27
UK Albums (OCC)	41
UK Independent Albums (OCC)	3
US Independent Albums (Billboard)	42
US Vinyl Albums (Billboard)	15
