= My Back Was a Bridge for You to Cross =

Studio album by Anohni and the Johnsons
- Released: July 7, 2023
- Genre: Soul
- Length: 41:19
- Label: Secretly Canadian
- Producers: Jimmy Hogarth; Anohni

Anohni and the Johnsons chronology
Turning (as Antony and the Johnsons) (2014)	My Back Was a Bridge for You to Cross (2023)

Anohni chronology
Paradise (2017)	My Back Was a Bridge for You to Cross (2023)

Singles from My Back Was a Bridge for You to Cross
- 1. "It Must Change" Released: May 16, 2023; 2. "Sliver of Ice" Released: June 13, 2023; 3. "Why Am I Alive Now?" Released: July 5, 2023

My Back Was a Bridge for You to Cross is the fifth studio album by Anohni and the Johnsons, formerly known as Antony and the Johnsons. It was released on July 7, 2023, by Secretly Canadian. The album was co-produced by Jimmy Hogarth, and features contributions from Leo Abrahams, Chris Vatalaro, Samuel Dixon, and Rob Moose.

The album was announced in May 2023. The lead single, "It Must Change", was released the same day, along with a music video starring Munroe Bergdorf. Two more singles were released after, each with their own music videos, as well as a fourth video for the song "Scapegoat".

The album, primarily consisting of soul music, was received positively by critics and included on a number of publications' year-end lists. It also charted in several countries. The album cover features a photo of the LGBTQ rights activist Marsha P. Johnson, the band's namesake.

== Background and recording ==
The album is the band's first since 2010's Swanlights, and Anohni's first since her 2017 EP Paradise.

Anohni and producer Jimmy Hogarth's original points of reference were jazz singers Nina Simone and Jimmy Scott. The two began working together in 2022, piecing together demos based on the former's lyrics, with Anohni playing piano and Hogarth playing guitar. They would immediately record those demos as soon as they were finished, getting through three or four songs a day across two weeks, with the record mostly finished after that. Later, Hogarth brought together a studio band including Leo Abrahams, Chris Vatalaro, Samuel Dixon, and Rob Moose who provided string arrangements. Many of the vocal recordings on the album were Anohni's first takes.

== Themes ==
The album covers a variety of topics, including prejudice within the context of a broader societal upheaval on "It Must Change" and environmentalism on "There Wasn't Enough". "Sliver of Ice" was inspired by a conversation Anohni had with Lou Reed weeks before he died in 2013, with lyrics pulled directly from things he said about an ice cube in his mouth and his realization of the beauty of cold water.

Marsha P. Johnson was Anohni's muse for the album. Anohni, then studying experimental theatre at New York University, met Johnson in the summer of 1992, just six days before Johnson was found dead in the Hudson River. Anohni has regarded Johnson as a "spiritual guide", named her band after Johnson, and has written about her before on songs such as "River of Sorrow" from the Johnsons' self-titled debut album.

== Release ==
The album was first teased on May 9 when Anohni posted a photo of two billboards in Camden Town to her Instagram page. The first billboard had the band's new name, Anohni and the Johnsons, and the second had the words "It Must Change" handwritten in all caps. The caption on the post confirmed that "It Must Change" is the name of the band's upcoming single. "It Must Change" was released on May 16 with a music video directed by Iain Forsyth and Jane Pollard and starring Munroe Bergdorf. That same day, the band announced the album as well as its release date, track listing, and album cover featuring a photo of Marsha P. Johnson, the band's namesake, taken by Alvin Baltrop. The album was released on July 7, 2023, by Secretly Canadian.

The second single, "Sliver of Ice", was released on June 13 along with a music video. The third, "Why Am I Alive Now?", was released on July 5, with a music video directed by Hunter Schafer. A music video for "Scapegoat" was released on October 5, directed by Anohni's sister Sara Hegarty.

== Critical reception ==
Professional ratings
Aggregate scores
Source	Rating
AnyDecentMusic?	8.2/10
Metacritic	88/100
Review scores
Source	Rating
AllMusic	4/5 stars
The Arts Desk	4/5 stars
Beats Per Minute	85%
Clash	9/10
DIY	4/5 stars
NME	4/5 stars
The Observer	5/5 stars
Paste	9.3/10
Pitchfork	8.7/10
Slant Magazine	3/5 stars

According to the review aggregator Metacritic, My Back Was a Bridge for You to Cross received "universal acclaim" based on a weighted average score of 88 out of 100 from 17 critic scores.

NME's Patrick Clarke wrote that Anohni "eschews experimental sonics for warm vintage soul, but the results are no less vital" on the album, which he felt is "the most accessible thing she's ever made". Ed Lawson of DIY felt that "it's the sonically softer side that hits harder" and "it's an easy listen for an artist who's often embraced the abrasive", writing that the listener should "expect to cry – then get fired up". Hannah Jocelyn of Pitchfork described the album as "a soulful and intense record that provides a safe place to grieve nothing less than the destruction of the planet", and of the record's sound, noted "These songs sound organic, often like they were recorded live in the studio with barely any reverb, vocal processing, or production flourishes. Anohni's voice—and its origin story—is powerful enough to carry them alone." Michael Cragg of The Observer noted that "Anohni continues to soundtrack oppression, loss and alienation with heart-aching precision" and that the arrangements "add a soulful swagger to often brutally direct lyrics".

Spencer Kornhaber of The Atlantic states that the album "explicitly aligns her with the American protest-music tradition." Describing Anohni as "One of the most uncompromising artists of the 21st century", Kornhaber goes on to note that "Although lovely, these new songs still have a gruesome honesty." Charles Lyons-Burt of Slant Magazine found that the album includes "some of Anohni's most laidback and unfussy arrangements to date" and "marked by minimalist, sometimes gloomy guitar strumming" but called it a "pity, then, that so much of the music on My Back Was a Bridge for You to Cross underserves her anguished storytelling". Jenn Pelly of The New York Times stated "The title of Anohni's soulful new album ... is a testament to the hard work of carrying stories through time. It underscores the roots of the imposing stakes and unwavering purpose that have long been synonymous with Anohni". Pelly describes that Anohni and the record's co-producer Jimmy Hogarth composed "a fervent Muscle Shoals sound for Anohni's pointed, long-gestating lyrics."

Joe Muggs of The Arts Desk concluded that the album "does feel like an artist continuing to inhabit themselves in a very thought-through way", which makes its sound "genuinely a bold choice, in the same way the electronics of its predecessor were. A tough listen, but an impressive move". Richie Assaly of the Toronto Star states "the album sees the artist — whose celestial, sonorous voice remains a singular force of nature — resume her role as a radical truth-teller." John Amen of Beats Per Minute wrote that the album, "shows Anohni pivoting between stunningly direct and entrancingly oblique manifestos. A listener is left voyeuristically spellbound, striving to reconcile what they've encountered with the life they're currently living."

The album was nominated for Best Independent Album at the 2024 AIM Independent Music Awards.

=== Year-end lists ===
My Back Was a Bridge for You to Cross on year-end lists
Publication	#	Ref.
Crack	8	
Les Inrockuptibles	9	
Loud and Quiet	31	
Mojo	26	
Mondo Sonoro	5	
The New York Times (Lindsay Zoladz)	10	
The New Yorker	1	
The Quietus	97	
Rolling Stone	17	
Uncut	38	

== Track listing ==
All tracks are written by Anohni Hegarty.

My Back Was a Bridge for You to Cross track listing
No.	Title	Length
1.	"It Must Change"	4:55
2.	"Go Ahead"	1:30
3.	"Sliver of Ice"	3:41
4.	"Can't"	4:40
5.	"Scapegoat"	5:22
6.	"It's My Fault"	2:15
7.	"Rest"	5:45
8.	"There Wasn't Enough"	4:55
9.	"Why Am I Alive Now?"	5:59
10.	"You Be Free"	2:17
Total length:		41:19

== Personnel ==
Anohni and the Johnsons

- Anohni – vocals (all), piano (5, 8)
- Leo Abrahams – guitar (1, 3, 5, 6)
- Samuel Dixon – bass guitar (1, 3, 5, 6)
- Jimmy Hogarth – guitar, production, mixing
- Rob Moose – strings (1, 3–6, 9)
- Chris Vatalaro – drums (1, 3, 5, 6)

Additional contributors

- Greg Calbi – mastering
- Martin Slattery – percussion (1, 4, 6, 9), clarinet (2, 3, 5), piano (5), keyboards (7)
- William Basinski – saxophone (4)

== Charts ==
Chart performance for My Back Was a Bridge for You to Cross
Chart (2023)	Peak position
Belgian Albums (Ultratop Flanders)	24
Belgian Albums (Ultratop Wallonia)	80
Dutch Albums (Album Top 100)	42
French Albums (SNEP)	123
German Albums (Offizielle Top 100)	52
Portuguese Albums (AFP)	26
Scottish Albums (Official Charts)	20
Spanish Albums (Promusicae)	69
Swiss Albums (Schweizer Hitparade)	49
UK Album Downloads (Official Charts)	11
UK Independent Albums (Official Charts)	7
US Top Current Album Sales (Billboard)	53
