= Another World (EP) =

EP by Antony and the Johnsons
- Released: October 7, 2008
- Recorded: 2008
- Genre: Baroque pop
- Length: 19:30
- Label: Secretly Canadian / Rough Trade
- Producer: Anohni Hegarty

Antony and the Johnsons chronology
I Am a Bird Now (2005)	Another World (2008)	The Crying Light (2009)

Professional ratings
Review scores
Source	Rating
ChartAttack	4/5 stars
Pitchfork	8.0/10)
PopMatters	8/10

Another World is an EP by Antony and the Johnsons released on October 7, 2008 on compact disc and 12" vinyl. It precedes Antony and the Johnsons third album, The Crying Light. The EP features five previously unreleased recordings, including the first single from The Crying Light, "Another World".

The cover is a photograph of Japanese butoh performer Kazuo Ohno, taken by Pierre-Olivier Deschamps in 1984.

== Track listing ==
All songs written by Antony.

1. "Another World" – 4:02
2. "Crackagen" – 2:32
3. "Shake That Devil" – 5:19
4. "Sing for Me" – 2:30
5. "Hope Mountain" – 5:11

== Track history ==
"Crackagen" is nearly nine years old; the earliest accessible recording of "Crackagen" is from 2003, in a video recording of Antony's performance at the Oni Gallery in Boston. That video is available on Antony and the Johnsons' official discography.

"Shake That Devil", previously known as "Shake That Dog", was performed often on Antony and the Johnsons' 2006–2007 tour, with varying lyrics. The studio version features a downtempo intro to the song.

"Another World", "Sing for Me", and "Hope Mountain" are entirely new.

== Chart performance ==
Chart performance for Another World
Chart (2008)	Peak position
Australian Physical Singles (ARIA)	31
Finnish Singles Chart	14
France (SNEP)	36
Sweden (Sverigetopplistan)	33
US Billboard 200	179
US Top Independent Albums	29
US Top Heatseekers	4

In 2009 it was awarded a silver certification from the Independent Music Companies Association, which indicated sales of at least 30,000 copies throughout Europe.
