= Manta Ray (song) =

Single by Anohni

from the album Racing Extinction: Original Motion Picture Soundtrack
- Released: 6 November 2015
- Genre: Pop; baroque pop
- Length: 5:18
- Songwriters: J. Ralph, Anohni
- Producer: J. Ralph

"Manta Ray" is an original song composed by J. Ralph and Anohni and performed by Anohni. The song was released as the lead single from the soundtrack album of 2015 documentary Racing Extinction written by Anohni.

"Manta Ray" received critical acclaim and was nominated for Academy Award for Best Original Song at 88th Academy Awards for Anohni and J. Ralph.

== Composition ==
The lyrics are written and sung by singer Anohni, with the melody and music composed by J. Ralph who also produced the recording. The song was inspired by the mating call of the last individual survivor of the now extinct Kauaʻi ʻōʻō. The music video created by Noe Sardet from the stuning images of The Plankton Chronicles Project features various marine plankton organisms.

== Awards ==
- 2016: Academy Award for Best Original Song - nominated
