= The Crying Light =

Studio album by Antony and the Johnsons
- Released: January 19, 2009
- Genre: Baroque pop
- Length: 39:24
- Label: Secretly Canadian
- Producer: Anohni

Antony and the Johnsons chronology
I Am a Bird Now (2005)	The Crying Light (2009)	Swanlights (2010)

Singles from The Crying Light
- 1. "Another World" Released: October 7, 2008; 2. "Epilepsy Is Dancing" Released: April 26, 2009; 3. "Aeon" Released: August 3, 2009

Professional ratings
Aggregate scores
Source	Rating
AnyDecentMusic?	7.1/10
Metacritic	80/100
Review scores
Source	Rating
AllMusic	4.5/5 stars
The A.V. Club	A
Entertainment Weekly	A−
The Guardian	3/5 stars
Los Angeles Times	4/4 stars
NME	8/10
Pitchfork	8.6/10
Q	4/5 stars
Rolling Stone	3/5 stars
Spin	3.5/5 stars

The Crying Light is Antony and the Johnsons' third studio album and the follow-up to the band's widely acclaimed second record, I Am a Bird Now. It was released on January 19, 2009, and preceded by the single "Another World", issued through Secretly Canadian on October 7, 2008. The album peaked in the Billboard European Top 100 at No. 1.

The Crying Light features orchestral arrangements by Anohni and Nico Muhly. Anohni has described its theme as being "about landscape and the future".

Ann Powers wrote of The Crying Light for the LA Times online, "It's the most personal environmentalist statement possible, making an unforeseen connection between queer culture's identity politics and the green movement. As music, it's simply exquisite – more controlled and considered than anything Antony and the Johnsons have done and sure to linger in the minds of listeners."

== Tours ==
In anticipation of The Crying Light, Antony and the Johnsons scheduled seven symphony concerts in 2008, including at the Barbican with the London Symphony Orchestra and at Disney Hall with the Los Angeles Philharmonic. These concerts were conducted by Jim Holmes and Rob Moose, with scores arranged by Nico Muhly.

Antony and the Johnsons toured throughout North America and Europe in support of the album between February and June 2009.

Anohni went on to present a unique staging of The Crying Light in collaboration with the Manchester Camerata (conducted by Rob Moose) at the Manchester Opera House for the 2009 Manchester International Festival. The concert hall was transformed into a crystal cave constructed by Carl Robertshaw and filled with laser effects created by installation artist Chris Levine in collaboration with lighting designer Paul Normandale.

== Artwork ==
The album's cover artwork features a 1977 photograph of butoh dancer Kazuo Ohno, by Naoya Ikegami. Anohni said of the image: "The Crying Light is dedicated to the great dancer Kazuo Ohno. In performance I watched him cast a circle of light upon the stage, and step into that circle, and reveal the dreams and reveries of his heart. He seemed to dance in the eye of something mysterious and creative; with every gesture he embodied the child and the feminine divine. He's kind of like my art parent."

A music video for the single "Epilepsy Is Dancing" was produced by the Wachowskis and featured Johanna Constantine, choreographer Sean Dorsey, and the design of painters Tino Rodríguez and Virgo Paraiso.

== Track listing ==
All tracks are written by Anohni, except where noted.

The Crying Light track listing
No.	Title	Writer(s)	Length
1.	"Her Eyes Are Underneath the Ground"	Anohni; Nick Hegarty	4:24
2.	"Epilepsy Is Dancing"		2:42
3.	"One Dove"	Anohni; Barry Reynolds	5:34
4.	"Kiss My Name"		2:48
5.	"The Crying Light"		3:18
6.	"Another World"		4:00
7.	"Daylight and the Sun"		6:21
8.	"Aeon"		4:35
9.	"Dust and Water"		2:50
10.	"Everglade"		2:58
Total length:			39:24

Secretly Canadian pre-order bonus track
No.	Title	Length
1.	"My Lord My Love"	3:17
Total length:		42:41

== Charts ==
=== Weekly charts ===
Weekly chart performance for The Crying Light
Chart (2009)	Peak position
Australian Albums (ARIA)	33
Austrian Albums (Ö3 Austria)	21
Belgian Albums (Ultratop Flanders)	1
Belgian Albums (Ultratop Wallonia)	22
Danish Albums (Hitlisten)	3
Dutch Albums (Album Top 100)	4
European Albums (Billboard)	1
Finnish Albums (Suomen virallinen lista)	23
French Albums (SNEP)	4
German Albums (Offizielle Top 100)	15
Greek Albums (IFPI)	26
Irish Albums (IRMA)	8
Italian Albums (FIMI)	9
Norwegian Albums (VG-lista)	4
Polish Albums (ZPAV)	38
Scottish Albums (Official Charts)	23
Spanish Albums (Promusicae)	2
Swedish Albums (Sverigetopplistan)	2
Swiss Albums (Schweizer Hitparade)	7
UK Albums (Official Charts)	18
UK Independent Albums (Official Charts)	1
US Billboard 200	65
US Independent Albums (Billboard)	7
US Top Alternative Albums (Billboard)	18
US Top Rock Albums (Billboard)	23

=== Year-end charts ===
Year-end chart performance for The Crying Light
Chart (2009)	Position
Belgian Albums (Ultratop Flanders)	44
Dutch Albums (Album Top 100)	80
French Albums (SNEP)	130

In 2009, the album was awarded a gold certification from the Independent Music Companies Association, denoting sales in excess of 100,000 copies across Europe.
