= Live at St. Olave's Church =

2003 live album

Live album by Current 93/Antony and the Johnsons
- Released: 2003
- Recorded: 5 and 6 April 2002
- Genre: Baroque pop, neofolk
- Length: 19:23
- Label: Durtro

Live at St. Olave's Church is a 2003 album by English experimental group Current 93. It was released in on the branch label PanDurtro of David Tibet's of Current 93's label Durtro.

== Track listing ==
1. Antony and the Johnsons – "You Stand Above Me" – 1:36
2. Antony and the Johnsons – "The Lake" – 4:48
3. Antony and the Johnsons – "Cripple and the Starfish" – 4:51
4. Current 93 – "Judas as Black Moth" – 1:49
5. Current 93 – "Sleep Has His House" – 2:54
6. Current 93 – "Walking Like Shadow" – 3:27

== Personnel ==
Tracks 1–3

- Antony Hegarty – piano, voice
- Maxim Moston – violin

Tracks 4–6

- David Tibet – voice
- Maja Elliott – piano
- Michael Cashmore – guitar
