= Christian Biegai =

- Born: 14 December 1974 (age 51); Berlin, Germany
- Origin: Berlin
- Genres: Film music
- Occupations: Composer, Saxophonist
- Instrument: saxophone
- Years active: 2000–present
- Website: www.christianbiegai.com (official)

Christian Biegai (born 14 December 1974) is a German composer and saxophonist. He is primarily known for his work in film and television music and for his compositions for saxophone and chamber ensembles.

== Education ==
Biegai studied saxophone at the Berlin University of the Arts and the Royal College of Music in London. He subsequently studied at Rutgers University in New Jersey, where he completed a Master of Music degree with a focus on orchestration, electroacoustic music and composition.

== Career ==
Biegai began working as a composer and sound designer in the early 2000s. His early work included the short film Whistle (2002), directed by Duncan Jones, and the film Sunday, in August, which was broadcast by France 3. He also worked with digital artist and multimedia producer Helena Bulaja, composing music for the animated project Regoch (2006). In 2004, Biegai worked in New York with audio engineer and producer Frank Verderosa at Planet V. He later worked as a music editor and composer at Park Road Post in Wellington, New Zealand. During this period he collaborated with composer and sound designer Dave Whitehead and musician Riki Gooch on the television documentary series The Big Picture. Their music received the 2008 Qantas Television Award for Best Original Music in General Television. Biegai subsequently returned to Germany and composed music for feature films, television films, documentaries and television series. His film work includes Marc Meyer's Wir sagen Du! Schatz. (2007), Brigitte Bertele's Nacht vor Augen (2008) and Der Brand (2011), and Grenzgang (2013). Nacht vor Augen premiered at the 58th Berlin International Film Festival in 2008. His television work has included the children's series Löwenzahn, for which he composed music for numerous episodes between 2011 and 2019, as well as the crime series Tatort. From 2020 to 2024 he worked on the television series Blutige Anfänger. Other television credits include Ku'damm 59 and Der Barcelona-Krimi.

=== Collaboration with Kerim König ===
Since 2019, Biegai has collaborated with composer and musician Kerim König on film and television music. Their work together includes the television series Blutige Anfänger and several episodes of the Tatort series, including Rhythm and Love (2021), Propheteus (2022), MagicMom (2023), Unter Gärtnern (2024) and Fiderallala (2025). For their score for Tatort: Propheteus, Biegai and König were nominated in the music category of the 2022 German Academy of Television awards.

== Saxophone ==
Alongside his work as a composer, Biegai has performed as a saxophonist with orchestras and ensembles including the Berlin Philharmonic, the New Zealand Symphony Orchestra, the Auckland Philharmonia Orchestra, the Mendelssohn Chamber Orchestra Leipzig and the saxophone quartet clair-obscur. He has also performed with musicians and groups including Michael Nyman, Antony and the Johnsons, DM Stith, Edison Woods and Barbara Morgenstern. In 2000, Biegai performed with Michael Nyman at the Berlin International Film Festival in a presentation of Nyman's music for Fernand Léger's 1924 film Ballet Mécanique. In 2005, he recorded Gerald Busby's composition 3:20 for solo saxophone. Busby subsequently dedicated his composition Speak to Biegai and premiered it at Carnegie Hall.

== Concert music ==
Biegai's concert works frequently incorporate saxophones, electronics, prepared piano and multimedia elements. His compositions include: Zapping (2011), for two soprano saxophones and tape Quartett (2013), for saxophone quartet TV Nation (2014), for soprano saxophone, piano and tape Quintett (2017), for saxophone quartet and piano Kippers and Curtains (2018), for baritone saxophone, violin and tape Mensch Maschine System (2018), for four Electronic Wind Instruments, drum machine and samples For the Time Being (2025), for soprano saxophone and prepared piano Proprium – Tożsamość (2025), for alto saxophones and piano Your Crooked Jaw (2026), for two baritone saxophones and tape In December 2025, the Royal Birmingham Conservatoire presented Biegai in Brum, a concert devoted to Biegai's music. The programme included performances of his Quartett and Quintett by the conservatoire's saxophone ensemble and guest musicians.

== Installation ==
In 2009, Biegai composed Dwelling for Norduung, a four-channel music installation for a sculpture by Gregor Kregar.

== Selected filmography ==
=== Feature films and television films ===
Whistle (2002) – short film Wir sagen Du! Schatz. (2007) Nacht vor Augen (2008) Der Brand (2011) Grenzgang (2013) Das kalte Eisen (2013) Ellas Entscheidung (2015) Mi America (2015) Ku'damm 59 – Im Urwald (2018)

=== Television ===
Tatort – Im Sog des Bösen (2009) Löwenzahn (2011–2019) Tatort – Die Pfalz von oben (2019) Blutige Anfänger (2020–2024) Der Barcelona-Krimi – Blutiger Beton (2020) Tatort – Rhythm and Love (2021) Tatort – Propheteus (2022) Tatort – MagicMom (2023) Tatort – Unter Gärtnern (2024) Tatort – Fiderallala (2025)

== Awards and nominations ==
2008: Qantas Television Award for Best Original Music in General Television, for The Big Picture, with Dave Whitehead and Riki Gooch. 2022: Nomination, German Academy for Television, Music, for Tatort: Propheteus, with Kerim König.

== Discography ==
=== Film and television music ===
Blutige Anfänger (2020) Der Barcelona-Krimi (2020) Tatort: Propheteus (2022) Tatort: Unter Gärtnern (2024)
