= Lynette Wallworth =

Australian artist/filmmaker

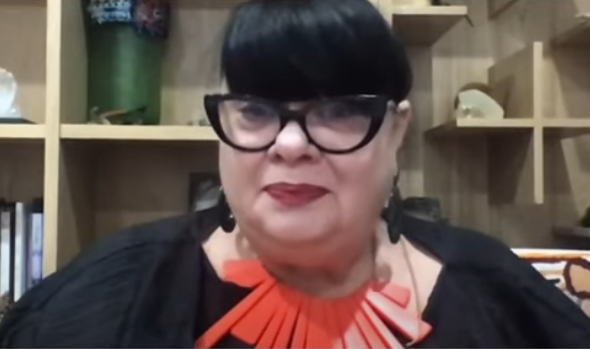
- Speaking at the 2021 World Economic Forum
- Education: UNSW Art & Design
- Occupations: Artist, filmmaker
- Awards: Byron Kennedy Award (2016); News and Documentary Emmy (2017, 2020)

Lynette Wallworth is an Australian artist and filmmaker, known for her use of emerging technologies such as virtual reality (VR), and interactive installations. She is known for her 2016 VR project Collisions, which tells of the "collision" between Aboriginal Australians and western culture in the form of British nuclear testing at Maralinga in the 1950s. She has won two Emmy Awards for her work: one for Collisions and one for Awavena.

== Early life and education ==
Wallworth attended the UNSW Art & Design.

== Media, themes and practice ==
Wallworth's works span virtual reality 360 film, feature documentary, and digital fulldome and interactive video installations.

Wallworth's work reflects on the connections between people and the natural world. She often works in series or meditations on one theme, and her works experiment with using the latest technology. She aims to build a sense of community, compassion, revelation and wonder. The environments often rely on interaction with the participant/viewer.

== Works ==
In 2010, Wallworth was invited to the Netherlands to create video imagery for the Hungarian composer György Kurtág's piece, Kafka Fragmente. Her visual imagery accompanied the performance of the work. In the same year she developed interactive she developed interactive video for the English National Opera performance of Henze's Elegy for Young Lovers, directed by Fiona Shaw.

=== CORAL (2012) ===
Wallworth's 2012 work CORAL Rekindling Venus creates an immersive film experience in a digital full-dome planetarium. The film uses underwater footage of coral reefs and sea life to portray a fragile ecosystem under threat from global warming. The work was launched on the Transit of Venus 2012, and screened in 23 different cities worldwide during the week of the Transit. It screened as part of the World Science Festival NYC, the London 2012 Cultural Olympiad and at the Sundance Film Festival 2013 as part of New Frontier. New York-based composer and performer Antony Hegarty wrote the song "Rise" for the film. The music of Max Richter, Tanya Tagaq Gillis, Geoffrey Gurrumul Yunupingu, Fennesz and Sakamoto, also feature in the film.

She developed a companion artwork for CORAL in the form of a set of interactive posters that are triggered into life by a mobile phone app called coral RKV.

=== Collisions (2016) ===
Wallworth's VR narrative Collisions (2016), was developed through the inaugural Sundance Institute New Frontier-Jaunt VR Residency. It was the first in a series of mixed-reality works, tells the story of Nyarri Morgan, a Martu man from the Western Australian desert, whose first contact with Western culture came in the 1950s when he witnessed the British nuclear testing at Maralinga in South Australia. It was the first theatrical screening of a VR work in the Egyptian Theatre at the 2016 Sundance Film Festival, and was the first ever screening of a VR work at the Museum of Modern Art. Collisions went on to play in festivals around the world, including Tribeca, London, San Francisco, and Sheffield DocFest. Its Australian premiere season was commissioned by the Adelaide Film Festival in October 2016.

Collisions was also shown a UN Eminent Persons Group headed by Hans Blix in Vienna relating to the Comprehensive Nuclear Test Ban Treaty (which has not yet been ratified by all parties).

The project was produced by Infinite Field, in partnership with Jaunt VR, with funding from the World Economic Forum, the Sundance Institute, the MacArthur Foundation, the Australia Council for the Arts, the Adelaide Film Festival Fund, and a number of other foundations and corporate sponsors.

In March 2017, Wallworth shared plans to turn Collisions into a five-part series, each episode focusing on a different indigenous community.

Collisions won the Outstanding New Approaches to Documentary Award at the News & Documentary Emmy Awards in October 2017, on the day after it had screened on the opening night of the Adelaide Film Festival.

=== Interactive video ===
Wallworth's interactive video installation Hold: Vessel (2001) involves the viewer with the natural world. Visitors hold a glass bowl and walk into a darkened room. The bowls "catch" falling images of microscopic marine life and telescopic astronomical imagery from video projectors positioned in the ceiling. Hold: Vessel 2 (2007) follows on from Hold: Vessel 1, and uses footage indicating changes in fragile marine environments such as Tasmania's giant kelp forests as well as footage from the 2004 Transit of Venus, a rare astronomical event, and historically an event that signals global scientific co-operation.

Evolution of Fearlessness (2006), commissioned by Peter Sellars for the Vienna Festival, is another intimate interactive installation. For this work, Wallworth filmed portraits of several women residing in Australia‚ but originating from countries such as Afghanistan‚ Sudan‚ Iraq and El Salvador‚ who have lived through war‚ survived concentration camps or extreme acts of violence. She wanted to show women who had a quality of resilience. The installation is designed for a one-to-one experience. When a person approaches the work they walk down a hallway and step up onto a platform before a doorway that pulses with blue light. There is an area of the video that is lit up and when a person puts their hand on the video the interactive system responds with one of the women placing their hand on your hand. This creates an intimate relationship between the video image and the visitor. This work is a sequel to Wallworth's earlier work Invisible by Night (2004), which presents a projection of a life-sized grieving woman whose eternal pacing can be interrupted by the viewer.

Wallworth followed these works with a third in the series called Duality of Light (2009–2011), commissioned by Adelaide Film Festival, where the viewer has an encounter with a stranger who reminds them of their own mortality. Other interactive installations include Still/Waiting 2 (2006), which includes the dramatic movement of enormous flocks of birds from the South Australian Flinders Ranges. Another focuses on the audiences engagement with powerful human emotions such as grief, loss and the re-emergence of hope seen in Duality of Light (2009).

=== Other video and film ===
Wallworth's video work, Welcome, was created to greet visitors to the 2011 exhibition Identity: Yours, Mine, Ours multimedia exhibition at the Immigration Museum Victoria. In this work, different groups of people would either warmly welcome a visitor, or stand with their arms crossed in an unfriendly manner, frowning, or turn their backs.

In 2012 she was invited by the Martu people of Western Australia to develop a new video work for their exhibition We Don’t Need a Map, from a journey taken with them into the Western Desert. This work, called Still Walking Country, was first shown at the Fremantle Arts Centre.

Wallworth's feature documentary Tender (2014) follows a community group in the Australian town of Port Kembla as it seeks to establish its own not-for-profit, community-based funeral service. The film went on to win several awards. The not-for-profit funeral service Tender Funerals is now fully functioning and runs from the old Port Kembla Fire station, refurbished as a funeral home.

=== VR and mixed reality ===
Her mixed reality work Awavena had its premiere at the 2018 Sundance Film Festival's New Frontier program.

In September 2020, Awavena earned another Outstanding New Approaches to Documentary Award at the News & Documentary Emmy Awards for Wallworth.

== Selected exhibitions ==
Wallworth's work has been exhibited at the World Economic Forum, the Museum of Modern Art, the Smithsonian, the Lincoln Center for the Performing Arts, the Australian Centre for Contemporary Art, the Royal Observatory Greenwich for the London 2012 Cultural Olympiad, the Vienna Festival, the Auckland Triennial, and the Brighton Festival among many others, as well as various film festivals, including the Sundance, BFI London Film Festival, and Sydney Film Festival.

In April 2009, Wallworth's largest solo show so far in Australia opened at the Samstag Museum of Art as part of the BigPond Adelaide Film Festival.

== Personal life, other roles and interests ==
In 2020, after the disastrous 2019-2020 Australian bushfire season, Wallworth became a strong advocate for stronger leadership on climate change. In January 2020, she used her platform at the World Economic Forum's annual meeting to tell the world about the fires, and promote the message that new leaders were needed throughout the world, in particular youth, women and indigenous leaders. Her acceptance speech set the tone for the event.

As of 2017, Wallworth was living in Sydney.

== Recognition and awards ==
=== Fellowships, residencies, honours ===
- Unknown date: International Fellowship from the Arts Council of England
- Unknown date: New Media Arts Fellowship from the Australia Council for the Arts
- Unknown date: Joan and Kim Williams Documentary Fellowship
- 2010: Inaugural recipient of AFTRS Creative Fellowship
- 2016: Named one of "100 Leading Global Thinkers" of 2016 by Foreign Policy magazine, for immersing audiences in the destructive power of nuclear weapons
- 2020: Artist-in-residence at the Australian Human Rights Institute at UNSW, exploring how VR can be used to uphold the human rights of the dying
- 2022: Cybernetic Imagination Resident at the Australia National University School of Cybernetics

=== Awards ===
- 2012: Winner, DomeFest Awards, Art category, for CORAL
- 2014: Winner, AACTA, best televised documentary, for Tender
- 2014: Winner, Grand Jury Prize at the International Documentary Film Festival of Oceania (FIFO), for Tender
- 2014: Nominated, Grierson Award, for Tender
- 2014: Nominated, Margaret Mead Filmmaker Award, for Tender
- 2016: Winner, Byron Kennedy Award for Innovation and Excellence the Australian Academy of Cinema and Television Arts (AACTA)
- 2016: Winner, Inaugural Sydney UNESCO City of Film Award
- 2017: Winner, Outstanding New Approaches to Documentary Award at the News & Documentary Emmy Awards, for Collisions (2016)
- 2020: Winner, World Economic Forum, 26th annual Crystal Awards, "for her leadership in creating inclusive narratives"
- 2020: Winner, UNSW Alumni Award for Art & Culture
- 2020: Winner, Outstanding New Approaches to Documentary Award at the News & Documentary Emmy Awards, for Awavena
