= Anohni and the Johnsons =

American music ensemble

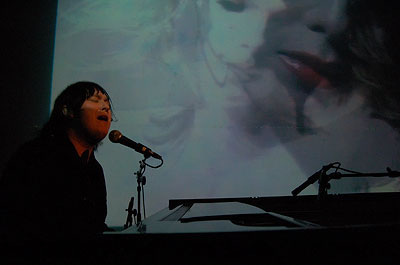
- Anohni performing in 2008

Background information
- Also known as: Antony and the Johnsons
- Origin: New York City, New York, U.S.
- Genres: Art pop; electronic; soul; chamber pop; avant-pop
- Years active: 1995–2015, 2022–present
- Labels: Secretly Canadian; Rough Trade
- Members: Anohni; Jimmy Hogarth; Leo Abrahams; Gael Rakotondrabe; Chris Vatalaro; Sam Dixon; Maxim Moston; Julia Kent; Doug Wieselman; Mazz Swift
- Past members: Rob Moose; Tahrah Cohen; Baby Dee; Joan Wasser; Reuben Butchart; Jeff Langston; Parker Kindred; Thomas Bartlett
- Website: anohni.com

Anohni and the Johnsons (previously known as Antony and the Johnsons) is a music ensemble originally based in New York City that presents the work of English singer-songwriter Anohni and her collaborators. The band released its self-titled debut album in 2000. Their second album, 2005's I Am a Bird Now, was certified Gold in the United Kingdom, Sweden, and Switzerland; it also was awarded that year's UK Mercury Prize.

Following the release of The Crying Light (2009) and Swanlights (2010), as well as the live album Cut the World (2012), Anohni released a solo electronic album in collaboration with Hudson Mohawke and Daniel Lopatin called Hopelessness in 2016. In 2023, Anohni returned as "Anohni and the Johnsons" with the release of her sixth album, My Back Was a Bridge for You to Cross, in July of that year.

Anohni and the Johnsons have received considerable critical acclaim in addition to chart success and award nominations. Anohni's unique singing voice has been compared to artists such as Nina Simone, Bryan Ferry and Jimmy Scott. As a performer, The Guardian has described Anohni as being "gifted with a vibrato voice – think Nina Simone, Billie Holiday – that sighs with sincerity and the lyrical prowess to make the profoundly personal both accessible and ambiguous."

== History ==
Anohni founded the NYC-based experimental theater group the Johnsons in 1995, choosing the name in honor of the NYC trans and human-rights activist Marsha P. Johnson. She assembled a group of musicians in 1997 to record her first album and began performing concerts in NYC as Antony and the Johnsons in 1997. British experimental musician David Tibet of Current 93 heard a demo and offered to release Anohni's music through his Durtro label. The self-titled debut album, Antony and the Johnsons, was released in 2000. In 2001, Anohni released a short follow-up EP, I Fell in Love with a Dead Boy, which, in addition to the title track, included a cover of "Mysteries of Love", a David Lynch/Angelo Badalamenti song, and "Soft Black Stars", a Current 93 cover.

Producer Hal Willner heard the EP and played it for Lou Reed, who recruited Anohni for his project The Raven; Anohni sang a version of Reed's 1972 song "Perfect Day". Now gaining more attention, Anohni signed to U.S.-based record label Secretly Canadian, and released another EP, The Lake, with Lou Reed guest-performing on one of the tracks. Secretly Canadian re-released Anohni's debut album in the United States to wider distribution in 2004. As one of the artists selected for that year's Whitney Biennial, Anohni presented Turning, a series of concerts as Antony and the Johnsons in tandem with live video portraits of 13 femme underground NYC figures including Connie Flemming, Honey Dijon, Kembra Pfahler, Joey Gabriel and Nomi Ruiz, in collaboration with film-maker Charles Atlas.

Antony and the Johnsons' second full-length album, 2005's I Am a Bird Now, was met with positive reviews and significantly more mainstream attention. The album featured guest appearances by Lou Reed, Rufus Wainwright, Boy George, and Devendra Banhart, and circled themes of duality and transformation. I Am a Bird Now featured arrangements by Maxim Moston and Julia Kent and was mixed by Doug Henderson. In September 2005 Antony and the Johnsons were awarded the Mercury Prize for the best UK album of 2005. Rival Mercury nominees, and favorites for the prize, the Kaiser Chiefs suggested that Anohni got in on a technicality; despite the fact she was born in the United Kingdom she spent much of her time in the U.S.—although they conceded that it was "a good album".

"Blue Angel"
Sample of Antony & the Johnsons Blue Angel

Following the success of I Am a Bird Now, in November 2006 Anohni re-staged Turning in Rome, London, Paris, Madrid, and Braga. The NYC cast of performers additionally included Julia Yasuda, Eliza Douglas, and Johanna Constantine. The Guardian called the piece "fragile, life affirming, and truly wonderful (five stars)" . Le Monde in Paris described Turning as "Concert-manifeste transsexuel".

In 2005, Antony and the Johnsons' single "Hope There's Someone" was featured in Spanish director Isabel Coixet's film The Secret Life of Words, and the 2007 film based on the life of Bob Dylan, I'm Not There, featured Anohni's cover of "Knockin' On Heaven's Door".

Antony and the Johnsons' five-song Another World EP was released on October 7, 2008. Antony and the Johnsons' third album, The Crying Light, was released on January 19, 2009, and went to No. 1 on the European Billboard charts. Anohni has described the theme of the album as being "about landscape and the future". Nature, death, love and the role of the artist were explored across ten tracks, which included the single "Epilepsy Is Dancing". The album was mixed by Bryce Goggin and included arrangements by Nico Muhly.

Ann Powers wrote of The Crying Light for the LA Times online, "it's the most personal environmentalist statement possible, making an unforeseen connection between queer culture's identity politics and the green movement. As music, it's simply exquisite—more controlled and considered than anything Antony and the Johnsons have done and sure to linger in the minds of listeners."

After touring throughout North America and Europe in support of their new album, Antony and the Johnsons presented a unique staging of The Crying Light with the Manchester Camerata at the Manchester Opera House for the 2009 Manchester International Festival. The concert hall was transformed into a crystal cave filled with laser effects created by installation artist Chris Levine. Antony and the Johnsons went on to present concerts with symphonies across Europe in Summer 2009, including the Opera Orchestra of Lyon, the Metropole Orchestra, Roma Sinfonietta and the Montreux Jazz Festival Orchestra. At Salle Pleyel in Paris, Anohni appeared in a costume designed for her by Riccardo Tisci of Givenchy.

After two sold-out concerts at the Sydney Opera House, Antony and the Johnsons ended their recent touring in February 2010 in Tokyo. Anohni, Johanna Constantine and William Basinski performed at the Sogetsu Hall with butoh master Yoshito Ohno, the son of the 103-year-old dancer Kazuo Ohno, whose image is featured on the cover of The Crying Light. Kazuo Ohno died in June of that year, and Anohni wrote an obituary for the dancer in The Guardian.

September 2010 saw the release of the Thank You For Your Love EP which includes covers of Bob Dylan's "Pressing On" and John Lennon's "Imagine". The Sun listed Thank You For Your Love as single of the week on August 27, 2010. Antony and the Johnsons performed "Thank You For Your Love" on both the Late Show with David Letterman and Later... with Jools Holland in support of the album's release.

In October 2010 Anohni was invited to "takeover" The Guardian's music and arts page that ran for weeks leading up to the release of Swanlights, the band's 4th album. Swanlights was released on October 12, 2010, through Secretly Canadian and Rough Trade Records. Simultaneously, Abrams Books published a book edition of Swanlights featuring Anohni's drawings and collages with photography by Don Felix Cervantes. Stereogum placed Swanlights in its Top 50 Albums of the year at #8.

In interviews around the world in 2010, Anohni described her work on Swanlights and The Crying Light as "a collision between joy and a sense of hopelessness". Anohni said she was struggling to come to terms with the idea that she was part of a society that was having a "virulent" impact on the earth. She suggested that the degradation of nature was partially a result of the subjugation of women and earth-based spiritual systems. Anohni also blamed the collapse of humanity's sustainable relationship with the earth in part on the rise of patriarchal religions that suggest the destiny of humanity to be "a paradise elsewhere". Interview Magazine describes Swanlights as "an emotional personal call for global, collective change".

In tribute to Kazuo Ohno, Antony and the Johnsons performed on October 30, 2010, at Lincoln Center's Avery Fisher Hall with the Orchestra of St. Luke's and featured the film "Mr. O's Book of the Dead" directed by Chiaki Nagano and starring Kazuo Ohno.

In January 2011, Anohni was a guest on Wintergasten, a program on Dutch television's VPRO channel and was interviewed by Leon Verdonschot.

In 2010–2011, the song "Her Eyes Are Underneath the Ground" from the album The Crying Light was chosen as one of the five stimuli that the International Baccalaureate Organization chose for the IB Theatre Arts PPP.

On January 26, 2012, the Museum of Modern Art in New York produced a sold-out performance by Antony and the Johnsons, entitled "Swanlights" after their fourth studio album, at Radio City Music Hall, a collaboration with laser artist Chris Levine and set designer Carl Robertshaw. The event was prefaced by a speech from Dr. Julia Yasuda, who said: "I am concerned about nature changing and dying. Won't you please help her? Otherwise the world will be too lonely". The New York Times described the concert as "Cries From the Heart, Crashing Like Waves". This collaboration was later staged at the Royal Opera House in London in 2013 for two days and at the Teatro Real in Madrid in 2014 for four consecutive days.

Antony and the Johnsons released a live symphonic album in August 2012 entitled Cut the World; it features a track called "Future Feminism", which consists of a speech in which Anohni disparages patriarchal religions and advocates for a shift towards feminine systems of governance as part of an effort to avert global ecological disaster.

On February 23, 2015, Anohni announced through her Facebook and official site the name of her new album, Hopelessness, although no release date was provided. The album was mixed and co-produced by Hudson Mohawke, Oneohtrix Point Never and herself. It would be released under the moniker Anohni. It was described as an "electronic record with some sharp teeth".

In June 2015, Antony and the Johnsons performed at Dark Mofo in Tasmania, Australia, as a benefit in support of the Martu people of Parnngurr in Western Australia in their fight to prevent a uranium mine from being developed near their community by Canadian multinational Cameco and Mitsubishi. Anohni appeared with Martu representatives at a press conference at the MCA in Sydney and on ABC's Q&A in further service of this cause.

In May 2016, Hopelessness was released by Anohni on Secretly Canadian and Rough Trade.

In 2019, following the passing of Johnsons collaborator Julia Yasuda, Anohni staged a surrealist play "Love" at The Kitchen in NYC, in part a tribute to the work they had performed together in the mid 90s.

On May 9, 2023, Anohni announced the change of her band's name to "Anohni and the Johnsons" via an Instagram post with a photo showing two billboards in Camden, England. The first billboard had the band's new name, and the second had the words "It Must Change" handwritten in all caps. The caption on the post confirmed that "It Must Change" is the name of the band's upcoming single. "It Must Change" was released on May 16, with a music video directed by Iain Forsyth and Jane Pollard and starring Munroe Bergdorf. On the same day, the band announced their fifth album, My Back Was a Bridge for You to Cross, released on July 7 by Secretly Canadian. A portrait of Marsha P. Johnson by Alvin Baltrop was featured on the album's cover. Music videos followed for "Sliver of Ice", "Why Am I Alive Now?" (direct by Hunter Schafer), and "Scapegoat", directed by Sara Hegarty. The album was chosen as #1 Album of 2023 by The New Yorker.

Anohni and the Johnsons toured Europe and North America in 2024. Bob Gendron of the Chicago Tribune wrote "Anohni and the Johnsons deliver on promise with 'It's Time to Feel What's Really Happening'...The timing of Anohni's declarations couldn't be more necessary. It represented the unvarnished truth. Performing their first local show in more than 15 years, the transgender singer and her group delivered nothing but sheer emotion during one of the most courageous, vital and provocative concerts to grace a Chicago stage in recent memory."

In November 2024, Anohni presented two concerts of songs by Lou Reed, her friend and mentor. The Guardian described the event as " a uniquely gifted interpreter pay[ing] homage to mentor Lou Reed... she's evidently in her element, taking risks with the song's melody and phrasing that justify the gig's appearance as part of the London jazz festival: you're very aware of an artist pushing at the boundaries and structure of a song on the spot...And sometimes, her reinterpretations seem faintly miraculous. Anohni is every bit as gifted an interpreter as you might imagine, and in Reed's oeuvre, she's found a perfect vehicle."

== Band members ==
Current members

- Anohni – lead vocals, piano (1995–present)
- Johanna Constantine – dancer (1995–present)
- Maxim Moston – violin (1999–present)
- Julia Kent – cello (1999–present)
- Rob Moose – guitar, violin (2004–present)
- Doug Wieselman – guitar, clarinet, soprano, and baritone saxophone (2004–present)
- Gael Rakotondrabe – piano (2010–present)
- Jimmy Hogarth – guitar (2023)
- Leo Abrahams – guitar, piano (2023)
- Chris Vatalaro – drums (2023)
- Sam Dixon – bass (2023)

Other members

- Julia Yasuda – narrator/performer/model (1996–2018)
- Reuben Butchart – piano (1998–2001)
- Tahrah Cohen – drums (1997–2005)
- Baby Dee – harp (1997–1998)
- Joan Wasser – viola (1999–2005)
- Jeff Langston – bass (2000–2009)
- Parker Kindred – drums (2004–2009)
- Thomas Bartlett – piano (2010–2022)

== Bibliography ==
- Anohni, Erika Yasuda, Julia Yasuda, SHE WHO SAW BEAUTIFUL THINGS, Rebis Music, 2019
- Kunsthalle Bielefeld, Anohni: My Truth, Konig Books, 2017
- Antony and the Johnsons, Swanlights, Abrams Image, 2010
- Jerome Solal, La Voix d'Antony, Le Mot et le Reste, 2011

== Discography ==
=== Studio albums ===
List of studio albums, with selected details, chart positions, and certifications
Title	Album details	Chart peak positions										Certifications (sales thresholds)
Title	Album details	US	AUS	AUT	DEN	FRA	GER	NED	NOR	SWE	UK	Certifications (sales thresholds)
Antony and the Johnsons	Released: February 8, 2000; Label: Durtro	—	—	—	—	—	—	—	—	59	118	
I Am a Bird Now	Released: February 1, 2005; Label: Secretly Canadian	—	69	71	38	45	—	58	4	22	16	BPI: Gold; GLF: Gold; IFPI NOR: Gold
The Crying Light	Released: January 19, 2009; Label: Secretly Canadian	65	33	21	3	4	15	4	4	2	18	
Swanlights	Released: October 11, 2010; Label: Secretly Canadian	122	70	30	20	16	29	10	4	9	28	
My Back Was a Bridge for You to Cross	Released: July 7, 2023; Label: Secretly Canadian	— (Note: My Back Was a Bridge for You to Cross did not enter the Billboard 200 but peaked at number 53 on the Current Album Sales chart.)	—	—	—	—	52	42	—	—	—	
"—" denotes releases that did not chart or were not released in that country.

=== Live albums ===
List of live albums, with selected details and chart positions
Title	Album details	Chart peak positions								
Title	Album details	AUT	DEN	FRA	GER	NED	NOR	SWE	SWI	UK
Live at St. Olave's Church	Released: 2003; 1st live release, three songs on a split EP with Current 93; Label: Durtro	—	—	—	—	—	—	—	—	—
Cut the World	Released: 2012; 2nd live release, 1st full-length live album; Label: Rough Trade	24	31	20	27	2	11	28	27	41
Del suo veloce volo (with Franco Battiato)	Released: 2013; Live album recorded at Verona; Hegarty performs eight songs with Battiato; Label: Universal Music	—	—	—	—	—	—	—	—	—
"—" denotes releases that did not chart or were not released in that country.

=== Soundtrack albums ===
List of soundtrack albums, with selected details and chart positions
Title	Details	Chart peak positions	
Title	Details	FRA	NED
Turning	Released: 2014; Soundtrack for Turning by Charles Atlas; Format: CD and DVD	146	70

=== Singles and EPs ===
Year	Single / EP	Chart peak positions						Record label	Album (main single / main track on EP)
Year	Single / EP	US	FRA	NED	SWE	UK	UK Budget	Record label	Album (main single / main track on EP)
1998	"Cripple and the Starfish" (single)	—	—	—	—	—	—		Antony and the Johnsons
2001	I Fell in Love with a Dead Boy (EP) * "I Fell in Love with a Dead Boy" / * "Mysteries of Love" / * "Soft Black Stars"	—	—	—	—	—	—	Durtro	
2003	"Calling for Vanished Faces" / "Virgin Mary" (7" Promo split single, 500 copies)	—	—	—	—	—	—	Current 93	
2004	The Lake (EP) * "The Lake" / * "Fistful of Love" / * "The Horror Has Gone"	—	—	—	—	—	—	Secretly Canadian	"Fistful of Love" from I Am a Bird Now
2005	Hope There's Someone (EP) * "Hope There's Someone" / * "Frankenstein" / * "Just One Star"	—	—	—	—	44	—	Secretly Canadian	"Hope There's Someone" from I Am a Bird Now
2005	You Are My Sister (EP) * "You Are My Sister" / * "Poorest Ear" / * "Forest of Love" / * "Paddy's Gone"	—	190	96	—	39	—	Secretly Canadian / Rough Trade	"You Are My Sister" from I Am a Bird Now
2006	I Fell in Love with a Dead Boy (EP, reissued)	—	—	—	—	—	—	Rebis Music	
2008	Another World (EP) * "Another World" / * "Crackagen" / * "Shake That Devil" / * "Sing for Me" / * "Hope Mountain"	179	36	—	33	—	6	Secretly Canadian	"Another World" from The Crying Light
2009	"Epilepsy Is Dancing" (single) * "Epilepsy Is Dancing" / * "Where Is My Power?"	—	79	—	—	—	—	Secretly Canadian	"Epilepsy Is Dancing" from The Crying Light
2009	"Aeon" / "Crazy in Love" (Double A-side single) * "Aeon" / * "Crazy in Love" (Beyoncé cover)	—	—	14	—	—	—	Secretly Canadian	"Aeon" from The Crying Light
2010	Thank You for Your Love (EP) * "Thank You for Your Love" / * "You Are the Treasure" / * "My Lord My Love" / * "Pressing On" (Bob Dylan cover) * "Imagine" (John Lennon cover)	—	—	—	54	—	—	Secretly Canadian	"Thank You for Your Love" from Swanlights
2010	Swanlights (EP) * "Swanlights" / * "Find The Rhythm of Your Love" / * "Kissing No One" / * "Swanlights" OPN Edit	—	—	—	—	—	—	Secretly Canadian / Rough Trade	"Swanlights" from Swanlights
2012	"Cut the World (live)" (with Danish National Chamber Orchestra) (single)	—	188	88	—	—	—	Secretly Canadian	Cut the World
2013	"Fistful of Love"	—	58	—	—	—	—		I Am a Bird Now
2023	"It Must Change"	—	—	—	—	—	—		My Back Was a Bridge for You to Cross
2024	"Breaking"	—	—	—	—	—	—	Rough Trade	Non-album single

== Awards ==
Awards and nominations for Anohni and the Johnsons
Year	Awards	Work	Category	Result	Ref.
2005	Mercury Prize	I Am a Bird Now	Album of the Year	Won	
2005	Shortlist Music Prize	I Am a Bird Now	Album of the Year	Nominated	
2005	Antville Music Video Awards	"Hope There's Someone"	Best Video	Nominated	
2005	MOJO Awards	Antony and the Johnsons	Best New Act	Nominated	
2006	Danish Music Awards	Antony and the Johnsons	Best International Newcomer	Won	
2006	PLUG Awards	Antony and the Johnsons	Artist of the Year	Nominated	
2006	PLUG Awards	Antony and the Johnsons	Live Act of the Year	Nominated	
2006	PLUG Awards	"Hope There's Someone"	Song of the Year	Nominated	
2006	PLUG Awards	I Am a Bird Now	Album of the Year	Nominated	
2006	Meteor Music Awards	I Am a Bird Now	Best International Album	Nominated	
2006	GLAAD Media Awards	Antony and the Johnsons	Outstanding Music Artist	Nominated	
2009	Rober Awards Music Poll	Antony and the Johnsons	Best Songwriter	Won	
2009	Rober Awards Music Poll	"Crazy in Love"	Best Cover Version	Nominated	
2010	Best Art Vinyl	Swanlights	Best Art Vinyl	Nominated	
2010	Sweden GAFFA Awards	Antony and the Johnsons	Best Foreign Solo Act	Won	
2011	GLAAD Media Awards	Antony and the Johnsons	Outstanding Music Artist	Nominated	
2012	Lunas del Auditorio	Antony and the Johnsons	Best Foreign Rock Artist	Nominated	
2012	UK Music Video Awards	"Cut the World"	Best Alternative Video – UK	Nominated	
2013	Music Video Festival	"Cut the World"	Best International Video	Nominated	
2024	AIM Independent Music Awards	My Back Was a Bridge for You to Cross	Best Independent Album	Nominated	
2024	Libera Awards	My Back Was a Bridge for You to Cross	Best Outlier Record	Nominated	
