= Hopelessness (album) =

Studio album by Anohni
- Released: 6 May 2016
- Genres: Electropop; dance; experimental; synth-pop; EDM
- Length: 41:39
- Labels: Secretly Canadian (US); Rough Trade (UK); Hostess (Japan)
- Producers: Anohni; Hudson Mohawke; Oneohtrix Point Never

Anohni chronology
Hopelessness (2016)	Paradise (2017)

Singles from Hopelessness
- 1. "4 Degrees" Released: 30 November 2015; 2. "Drone Bomb Me" Released: 9 March 2016

Hopelessness is the debut solo album by British-American artist Anohni, frontwoman of Anohni and the Johnsons, released on 6 May 2016 on Secretly Canadian, Rough Trade, and Hostess. Featuring co-production by Hudson Mohawke and Oneohtrix Point Never, the album departs from the chamber pop style of her previous work, instead exploring an electronic sound and engaging directly with political and environmental themes in the form of protest songs.

Hopelessness was released to critical acclaim. It peaked at number 26 on the UK album charts and number 121 in the US. Hopelessness was nominated for a Mercury Prize in 2016, and Anohni was nominated for Best British Female at the BRIT Awards in 2017.

== Background and recording ==
Following her plaintive, chamber pop-styled work with the group Antony and the Johnsons in the early 2000s, Anohni began developing a radically different "Trojan horse" project that would instead feature a "glossy, plastic sound" while dealing more directly with political and environmental issues. Discussing her decision to move away from her earlier style, she reasoned: "at this point, I really feel like it's all hands on deck. An artist that's fiddle-faddling in opaque, gossamer gestures — I mean it's fine to do that, totally fine, but there's no time left." Conceptualized and recorded over three years, Anohni first began to collaborate with electronic musician Daniel Lopatin, whose work as Oneohtrix Point Never she had previously covered.

Anohni and Lopatin initially speculated on creating "a kind of Blade Runner–Kitarō–Japanimation soundtrack" before producer Ross Birchard, better known for his work in hip hop (cf. Kanye West) as Hudson Mohawke, became involved with the project in 2014. Birchard and Anohni had also collaborated on Birchard's 2015 album Lantern, during which time he sent Anohni the demo of what would become "Drone Bomb Me." Speaking to the New York Times, Anohni explained that "the kind of relentless, exuberant, almost ecstatic positiveness of Hudson's music was the perfect foil for more challenging lyrics than people would be used to hearing from me." Both producers worked on the tracks, with Anohni also taking part in the production process; Mohawke recalled: "she's not just writing these songs. She loves getting in there and twisting stuff up in Pro Tools and chopping stuff up and editing and rearranging. She's permanently finding all of these little magic things that wouldn't have occurred to us." Lopatin stated that "her range is crazy, the ideas are nuts, the movement is wild — you basically don't have to do that much. "

== Composition ==
Hopelessness is an electropop, dance, experimental, and synth-pop album. Lyrically, Anohni developed a stark political approach which addressed issues such as surveillance, drone warfare, capital punishment and environmental crisis. She explained to Pitchfork that she drew influence from 80's dance music during the AIDS epidemic, stating that "rage is a really fun place to dance from—expressions of anger sublimated into something beautiful are invigorating, especially if you feel like you’re telling the truth." Critic Jon Pareles noted that "she comes at her topics from unexpected angles — sometimes identifying with forces of destruction, sometimes mourning their ravages." She attempted to maintain a focus on the personal:

I tried to keep a focus on myself in terms of addressing my complicity in so many of these issues — as a taxpayer, as a consumer, as a passive participant. I got to thinking perhaps as an artist, even as an artist with the best of intentions, that I was kind of a microcosm of the brokenness of the whole system. That within my body I contained the whole conflict.

Commenting on "4 Degrees" in a fan interview earlier in the year, Hegarty had stated that she had "grown tired of grieving for humanity", adding that she felt she "was not being entirely honest by pretending that I am not a part of the problem. '4 Degrees' is kind of a brutal attempt to hold myself accountable, not just valorize my intentions but also reflect on the true impact of my behaviors." The song references projected temperature rise by 2100 and its effect on the extinction of wildlife. The song "Obama" depicts disillusionment with the tenure of US President Barack Obama.

== Promotion and release ==
On 23 February 2015, Anohni announced Hopelessness via the Antony and the Johnsons' website and Facebook account. In the announcement, Anohni described the album as "an electronic record with some sharp teeth". In a fan interview, Anohni described the upcoming album as "as different as could be from my previous work", adding she was "not sure that many of [those] who prefer the early chamber music style will enjoy it". Characterising it as a "dance / experimental electronic record with quite a dark thematic undertow", she revealed spring 2016 as the release date. On 30 November 2015, Anohni released "4 Degrees", the first song off of Hopelessness, along with an accompanying message: "In solidarity with the climate conference in Paris, giving myself a good hard look, not my aspirations but my behaviors, revealing my insidious complicity. It's a whole new world. Let’s be brave and tell the truth as much as we can."

On 9 March 2016, Anohni announced the release of the album's second single "Drone Bomb Me" via Facebook. The song, which premiered on Annie Mac's show on BBC Radio 1 later that day, was accompanied by a music video which she described as "insanely beautiful". As revealed shortly after the announcement on Anohni's Instagram account, the video was directed by Nabil Elderkin and stars English supermodel Naomi Campbell. On the same day, Anohni also revealed that Hopelessness will be released on 6 May 2016, along with the album's track listing.

== Critical reception ==
Professional ratings
Aggregate scores
Source	Rating
AnyDecentMusic?	8.1/10
Metacritic	83/100
Review scores
Source	Rating
AllMusic	3/5 stars
The A.V. Club	B+
The Guardian	5/5 stars
The Independent	4/5 stars
NME	4/5
The Observer	4/5 stars
Pitchfork	9.0/10
Q	4/5 stars
Rolling Stone	3.5/5 stars
Spin	9/10

Hopelessness was critically acclaimed, as evidenced by its average score of 83, meaning "universal acclaim", based on 30 reviews on the review aggregator Metacritic. Tim Jonze of The Guardian called Hopelessness "as profound a protest record as anyone has made in decades, brimming with anger, and yet, somehow, oddly accessible," concluding that, "For all its bleakness, Hopelessness leaves you feeling anything but." Writing for Exclaim!, Andrea Warner characterized Hopelessness as "a shimmering, shadowy electronic pop protest record that thunders and sparks, avenges and retreats, attacks and empowers," noting Anohni's "ownership and authority over her artistic voice that we've not yet seen before." T. Cole Rachel of Spin called the album "a potent political statement," and described the music as "gorgeous, matching the intensity of the subject matter without overwhelming it and giving the appropriate space to ANOHNI’s voice, which remains a glorious instrument." Jenn Pelly of Pitchfork praised the album, stating, "Anohni, HudMo, and OPN meet on an astral plane and construct a sleek salon there, where we can reflect on the current moment and perhaps be spurred to action," calling the album "some of the most accessible and pristinely infectious music that any of these people have made. Writing for NPR, Ann Powers said of the album, "The subject matter on Hopelessness can be grisly — state-sponsored execution, torture, animals expiring in trees — but the music, and Anohni's singing especially, brings the emotional rush of revelation."

=== Accolades ===
Publication	Accolade	Year	Rank	Ref.
Thump	The 33 Best Albums of 2016	2016	1	
Consequence of Sound	Top 50 Albums of 2016	2016	5	
The Guardian	Albums of the Year	2016	6	
Rough Trade	Albums of the Year	2016	6	
New York Times	The Best Albums of 2016	2016	8	
Pitchfork	The 50 Best Albums of 2016	2016	8	
Pitchfork	The 200 Best Albums of the 2010s	2019	48	
NME	NME's Albums of the Year 2016	2016	8	
The Skinny	Top 50 Albums of 2016	2016	8	
Billboard	50 Best Albums of 2016	2016	16	
Stereogum	The 50 Best Albums of 2016	2016	19	
NPR	The Best 50 Albums Of 2016	2016	32	
Rolling Stone	50 Best Albums of 2016	2016	35	
Paste	The 50 Best Albums of 2016	2016	38	
Mojo	The 50 Best Albums of 2016	2016	42	

== Track listing ==
No.	Title	Writer(s)	Producer(s)	Length
1.	"Drone Bomb Me"	Anohni; Ross Birchard	Hudson Mohawke; Oneohtrix Point Never; Anohni	4:10
2.	"4 Degrees"	Anohni; Daniel Lopatin; Birchard	Hudson Mohawke; Oneohtrix Point Never; Anohni	3:51
3.	"Watch Me"	Anohni; Birchard	Hudson Mohawke; Anohni	3:26
4.	"Execution"	Anohni; Birchard	Hudson Mohawke; Anohni	3:38
5.	"I Don't Love You Anymore"	Anohni; Lopatin	Oneohtrix Point Never; Anohni	5:00
6.	"Obama"	Anohni; Lopatin	Hudson Mohawke; Oneohtrix Point Never	4:11
7.	"Violent Men"	Anohni; Lopatin	Oneohtrix Point Never; Anohni	2:10
8.	"Why Did You Separate Me from the Earth?"	Anohni; Birchard	Hudson Mohawke; Anohni	3:36
9.	"Crisis"	Anohni; Lopatin; Birchard	Hudson Mohawke; Oneohtrix Point Never; Anohni	4:42
10.	"Hopelessness"	Anohni; Lopatin	Oneohtrix Point Never	3:54
11.	"Marrow"	Anohni; Birchard	Hudson Mohawke; Anohni	3:01
Total length:				41:39

== Personnel ==
- Anohni – additional beat programming, arranger, composer, drum programming, keyboards, lyrics, mixing, piano, production
- Ross Birchard (aka Hudson Mohawke) – beat programming, composer, drum programming, engineering, keyboards, production
- Daniel Lopatin (aka Oneohtrix Point Never) – beat programming, composer, drum programming, engineering, keyboards, production
- Paul Corley – engineering, additional production
- Inez van Lamsweerde and Vinoodh Matadin – photography
- Bianca & Sierra Casady (aka CocoRosie) - additional vocals on "Violent Men"

== Charts ==
Chart (2016)	Peak position
Australian Albums (ARIA)	35
Austrian Albums (Ö3 Austria)	28
Belgian Albums (Ultratop Flanders)	13
Belgian Albums (Ultratop Wallonia)	53
Dutch Albums (Album Top 100)	21
French Albums (SNEP)	48
German Albums (Offizielle Top 100)	29
Irish Albums (IRMA)	25
Italian Albums (FIMI)	39
Swedish Albums (Sverigetopplistan)	53
Swiss Albums (Schweizer Hitparade)	17
UK Albums (Official Charts)	26
US Billboard 200	121
US Top Alternative Albums (Billboard)	8
US Independent Albums (Billboard)	6
US Top Rock Albums (Billboard)	11

=== Year-end charts ===
Chart (2016)	Position
Belgian Albums (Ultratop Flanders)	151
