= Hope There's Someone =

Single by Antony and the Johnsons

from the album I Am a Bird Now
- Released: June 7, 2005
- Genre: Baroque pop
- Length: 4:24
- Label: Secretly Canadian; Rough Trade
- Songwriter: Anohni Hegarty
- Producer: Anohni Hegarty

Antony and the Johnsons singles chronology
"I Am a Bird Now" (2005)	"Hope There's Someone" (2005)	"You Are My Sister" (2005)

"Hope There's Someone" is a song by Antony and the Johnsons, released on June 7, 2005, through Rough Trade Records and Secretly Canadian. The song is the lead single from Antony and the Johnsons' second studio album I Am a Bird Now and considered one of their signature songs. In October 2011, NME placed the track at number 134 on its list "150 Best Tracks of the Past 15 Years". Pitchfork named it the 28th best song of the 2000s and the #1 single of 2005.

The sleeve photo is an image from the video featuring Joey Gabriel.

The song has sold 50,568 copies in the UK as of March 2016.

== Track listing ==
Single track listing
No.	Title	Length
1.	"Hope There's Someone"	4:24
2.	"Frankenstein"	5:10
3.	"Just One Star"	1:34
4.	"Hope There's Someone" (Video)	4:24
Total length:		15:32

== Charts ==
Chart performance for "Hope There's Someone"
Chart (2005)	Peak position
UK Singles (Official Charts)	44
