= You Are My Sister =

EP by Antony and the Johnsons
- Released: October 25, 2005
- Genre: Baroque pop
- Length: 15:08
- Label: Secretly Canadian; Rough Trade
- Producer: Anohni

Antony and the Johnsons chronology
Hope There's Someone (2005)	You Are My Sister (2005)	Another World (2008)

You Are My Sister is a four-track CD EP by Antony and the Johnsons, originally released in 2005 on Secretly Canadian Records and later in the UK and Europe by Rough Trade Records. The title track is taken from Antony and the Johnsons second studio album I Am a Bird Now and features co-lead vocals by Boy George. The remaining tracks were previously unreleased and are exclusive to the EP and its variants.

You Are My Sister reached number 39 on the UK Singles Chart.

== Track listing ==
Secretly Canadian CD

1. "You Are My Sister" – 4:00
2. "Poorest Ear" – 3:39
3. "Forest of Love" – 4:28
4. "Paddy's Gone" – 3:00

Rough Trade CD1

1. "You Are My Sister" – 4:00
2. "Poorest Ear" – 3:39

Rough Trade CD2

1. "You Are My Sister" – 4:00
2. "Forest of Love" – 4:28
3. "Paddy's Gone" – 3:00
4. "You Are My Sister" (Video) – 4:00

== Charts ==
Chart performance for You Are My Sister
Chart (2005)	Peak position
France (SNEP)	190
Italy (FIMI)	38
Netherlands (Single Top 100)	96
UK Singles (OCC)	39
