= Thank You for Your Love =

Thank You For Your Love EP

EP by Antony and the Johnsons
- Released: August 30, 2010
- Genres: Baroque pop, gospel
- Length: 18:39
- Labels: Secretly Canadian (US); Rough Trade (UK)
- Producer: Antony Hegarty

Antony and the Johnsons chronology
Aeon (2009)	Thank You For Your Love EP (2010)	Swanlights (2010)

Thank You for Your Love is an EP by Antony and the Johnsons released on August 30, 2010 via Rough Trade Records (UK) and Secretly Canadian (US). It also serves as the lead single of the band's 2010 album Swanlights.

== Background ==
In an interview with Billboard Hegarty calls her cover-version of "Imagine" by John Lennon an "audacious choice, since it's sort of hallowed ground" and states that she recorded the Bob Dylan cover version at the same time as she recorded "Knockin' on Heaven's Door" for the I'm Not There soundtrack.

The video for "Thank You for Your Love" consists of Super 8 footage Antony shot upon her arrival in New York City as a teenager in the early 1990s and is edited by David Boatman.

== Critical reception ==
Professional ratings
Review scores
Source	Rating
Pitchfork	7.5/10
Slant Magazine	2/5 stars
AllMusic	3.5/5 stars
Fact	3/5

Pitchfork call the E.P. "a coherent and unique entry in Antony's catalog", praising "Antony's singular voice and (the) deep rearrangements". Slant Magazine were less impressed, calling the E.P a "slim, paltry offering", calling the Lennon cover "facile" although the review praises the " interesting, somber interpretation" of Bob Dylan's "Pressing On". The review in AllMusic likes the Lennon cover better, stating that Hegarty's "falsetto moves the song from its trappings in the cultural imagination and liberates it as a respectful yet radical reinterpetation", summarizing that "as slight, whispy and utterly restrained as this set is, it offers an entirely different aural presentation of Hegarty". Fact call the E.P. "minimal in every respect", calling "My Lord My Love" the standout track with its "beautiful expressions of religious experience" but is mostly critical of the other tracks. Rolling Stone magazine called the Lennon cover "an unlikely, gorgeous reinvention" in a featured review of just that song.

== Track listing ==
All songs written by Antony Hegarty unless noted otherwise.

1. "Thank You for Your Love" – 4:14
2. "You Are the Treasure" – 2:09
3. "My Lord My Love" – 3:14
4. "Pressing On" (Bob Dylan) – 4:27
5. "Imagine" (John Lennon) – 4:39
- "Thank You for Your Love" (video) – 4:14

== Personnel ==
- Antony Hegarty – vocals, piano
- Kevin Barker – guitar
- Douglas Wieselman – guitar
- Jeff Langston – bass
- Greg Cohen – bass
- Parker Kindred – drums
- Briggan Krause – horns
- Paul Shapiro – horns
- Steven Bernstein – horns
- Stefon Harris – vibraphone
- William Basinski – tape loops
- Julia Kent – strings
- Maxim Moston – strings
- Rob Moose – strings
