= Cripple and the Starfish =

Song by Antony and the Johnsons

from the album Antony and the Johnsons
- Released: 1998
- Genre: Baroque pop
- Length: 4:11
- Label: Durtro, Secretly Canadian
- Songwriter(s): Anohni Hegarty

"Cripple and the Starfish" is a song written by Anohni and performed by Antony and the Johnsons, a Mercury Prize-winning music act from New York City. It was initially released on the compilation CD God Shave the Queen! in 1996. A different recording subsequently appeared on Antony and the Johnsons, the self-titled first album recorded in 1998. In 2003, a live version of this song appeared on the split album Live at St. Olave's.

== Origins ==
According to an article in Magnet magazine:

As a student at UC Santa Cruz, [Anohni] began writing, directing, producing and starring in musical plays. One of [her] first efforts was a John Waters-influenced melodrama called Sylvie And Meg. A more original production, staged a few years later in New York City, was titled Cripple And The Starfish. It’s set on a styrofoam island at the end of the world, after the land has been washed away by the greenhouse floods. At this point in the far future, humans have evolved into robotic beings, and the plot concerns the only two people left alive who still have hearts. “And they’re dysfunctional and co-dependent,” says [Anohni].

While the song may have been featured in the above-mentioned stage production, the precise relationship between the two works—and whether they were created together or if one is derivative of the other—is not indicated.

== Theme ==
The lyrics center around the narrator's willingness to accept, and even encourage, abuse from a romantic interest. The chorus says, in part, "It's true I always wanted love to be full of pain...I am so very, very happy, so come on and hurt me I am so very, very happy, so please hit me..." One critic wrote that "Cripple and the Starfish" is an example of how Anohni informs "emotions with their opposites" and cited the lyrics "I always wanted love to be / filled with pain and bruises" as a way in which the writer-singer "transforms [her] songs into deliciously painful pleasures."

A reviewer for The Guardian called this song "a majestic and poignant anthem about the unhelpful blindness of love in an abusive relationship" and said "It's about having your fingers cut off and them growing again, like a starfish. It's about coming back for more." Another critic deemed it "a redemptive love song", with Anohni "creating a metaphor for the pain of love with the repeated lyric 'I grow back like a starfish.'"

== Reviews ==
One of Anohni's first and better-known songs, "Cripple and the Starfish" is often lauded by music critics and fellow musicians. Lou Reed, whose collaborations with Antony and the Johnsons helped bolster the group's success, said of Anohni, "When I first heard 'Cripple and the Starfish'‚ I knew I was in the presence of an angel."

In describing a 2000 New York Public Theater performance of Antony and the Johnsons at Joe's Pub, a reviewer for Brainwashed discussed the single of this song stating that "since nothing is quite as fascinating as horror, I found myself returning repeatedly to "Cripple and the Starfish", and to my utter surprise discovered that I was hooked." That same year a reviewer for The Wire praised the song's emotional impact by saying that it sounds "as baffling and as upsetting in its fuller CD context" as it did as a single.

In 2001, The Village Voice mentioned this song as one which aptly demonstrates Anohni's "Disarmingly childlike" stage presence which "twines innocence to decidedly polymorphous perversity." A 2003 review in PAPER Magazine named "Cripple and the Starfish" as among Anohni's "gorgeous, crystal-pure tunes" that possesses "a silvery, sweetly masochistic intensity." In reviewing a 2004 appearance of the group at O2 Academy Islington, a reviewer for Mojo magazine said that Anohni "trills heartbreakingly" when performing this song.

In a review of a 2007 concert at the Brooklyn Academy of Music which paired Antony and the Johnsons with the Brooklyn Philharmonic, a reviewer for Rolling Stone magazine wrote that Anohni's older material was awakened with fresh vigor by the orchestra led by Nico Muhly and "Already emotionally firm, songs like 'Cripple and the Starfish' brimmed with intensity under a simmering arrangement." In a review of a 2008 performance of Antony and the Johnson at the Apollo Theatre, a writer for UGO referred to "Cripple and the Starfish" as one of the band's "classics."
