= Paradise (Anohni EP) =

EP by Anohni
- Released: 17 March 2017
- Length: 29:10
- Label: Secretly Canadian
- Producers: Anohni; Oneohtrix Point Never; Hudson Mohawke; Paul Corley

Anohni chronology
Hopelessness (2016)	Paradise (2017)

Singles from Paradise
- 1. "Paradise" Released: 26 January 2017

Professional ratings
Aggregate scores
Source	Rating
AnyDecentMusic?	7.3/10
Metacritic	80/100
Review scores
Source	Rating
The 405	7.5/10
AllMusic	3.5/5 stars
Beardfood	7.5/10
Crack Magazine	6/10
Exclaim!	9/10
The Music	3.5/5 stars
Paste	7.5/10
Pitchfork	7.7/10
PopMatters	8/10 stars
The Skinny	4/5 stars

Paradise is an extended play (EP) by British-American musician Anohni, released on 17 March 2017 by Secretly Canadian. The lead single, also titled "Paradise", was released on 26 January 2017. As with Anohni's previous album, Hopelessness, Paradise features collaborations with Hudson Mohawke and Oneohtrix Point Never.

The EP includes seven tracks, one of which called "I Never Stopped Loving You" has not been publicly released and was able to be acquired by sending Anohni, via her e-mail address, a personal e-mail sharing with her "...a sentence or two what you care most about, or your hopes for the future. Send this to me instead of the dollar you used to send me in the olden days."

== Track listing ==
No.	Title	Writer(s)	Producer(s)	Length
1.	"In My Dreams"	Anohni; Daniel Lopatin	Oneohtrix Point Never; Anohni	3:01
2.	"Paradise"	Anohni; Ross Birchard; Lopatin	Hudson Mohawke; Oneohtrix Point Never; Anohni	4:28
3.	"Jesus Will Kill You"	Anohni; Birchard	Mohawke; Anohni	3:27
4.	"You Are My Enemy"	Anohni; Lopatin	Anohni; Paul Corley^{[a]}	2:38
5.	"Ricochet"	Anohni; Birchard	Mohawke	3:59
6.	"She Doesn't Mourn Her Loss"	Anohni; Lopatin	Oneohtrix Point Never; Anohni	5:10
7.	"I Never Stopped Loving You"	Anohni; Lopatin	Oneohtrix Point Never	6:27
Total length:				29:10

Notes

- ^{^[a]} signifies an additional producer

== Personnel ==
Credits adapted from the liner notes of Paradise.

- Anohni – vocals, production (tracks 1–4, 6), mixing (tracks 1–5)
- Hudson Mohawke – production (tracks 2, 3, 5), mixing (track 5)
- Oneohtrix Point Never – production (tracks 1, 2, 6)
- Paul Corley – additional production (track 4)
- Chris Elms – mixing (tracks 1, 3–6)
- Valgeir Sigurðsson – mixing (track 2)

== Charts ==
Chart	Peak position
US Heatseekers Albums (Billboard)	24
