= Anohni =

British-born American singer (born 1971)

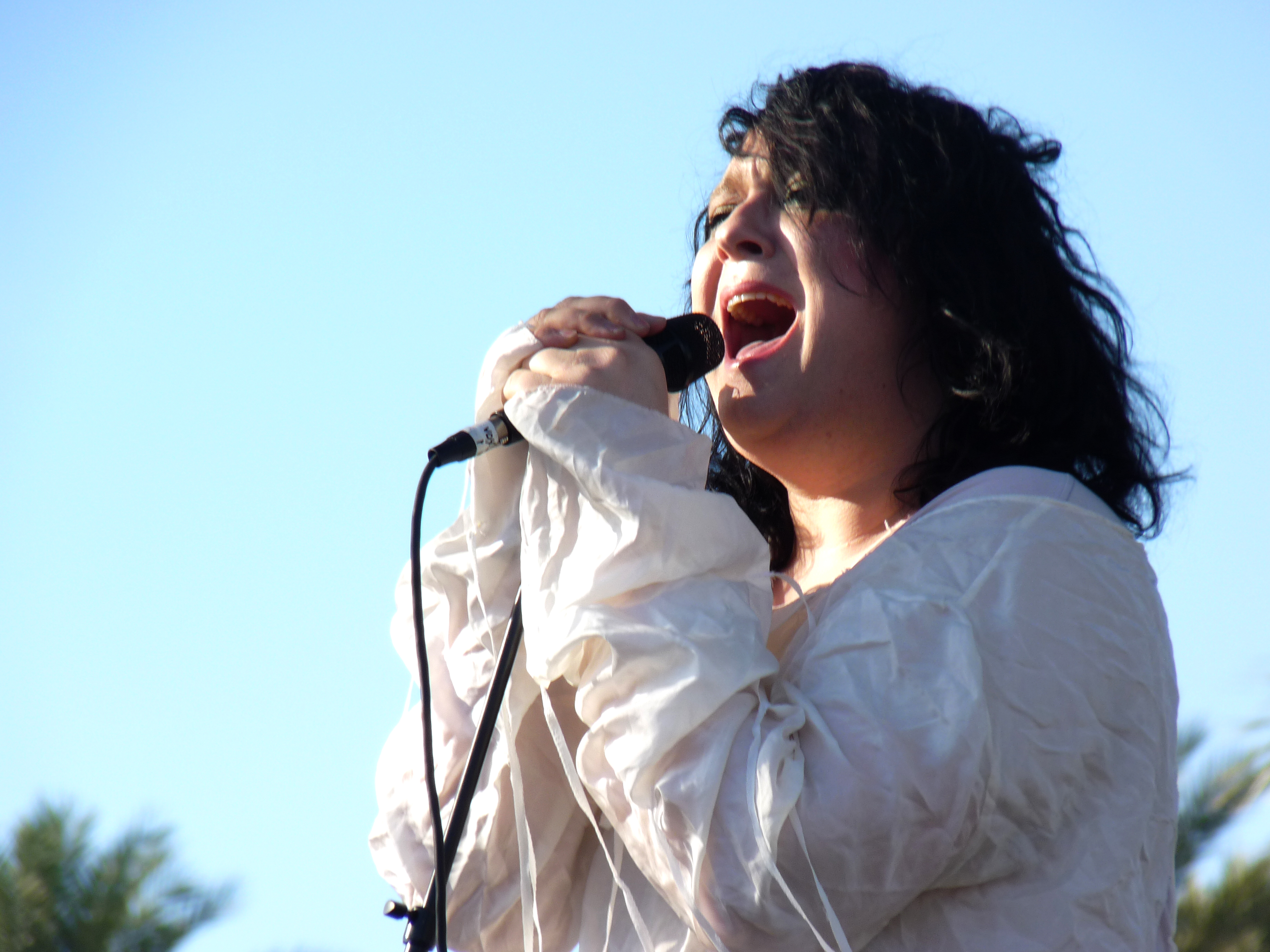
- Anohni in 2009

Background information
- Born: 24 October 1971 (age 55); Chichester, West Sussex, England
- Origin: New York City, United States
- Genres: Electronic; dance; experimental; chamber pop; art pop
- Occupations: Singer; songwriter; visual artist
- Instruments: Vocals; piano
- Years active: 1992–present
- Labels: Durtro, Secretly Canadian, Rough Trade
- Member of: Anohni and the Johnsons
- Website: anohni.com

Anohni Hegarty (born Antony Hegarty; 24 October 1971), known mononymously as Anohni (stylized in all caps), is a British-born singer, songwriter, and visual artist based in New York City and Ireland.

She has presented solo work and as the lead singer of the band Anohni and the Johnsons, formerly known as Antony and the Johnsons.

She started her musical career performing with an ensemble of New York musicians as Antony and the Johnsons. Their self-titled first album was released in 2000 on David Tibet's label Durtro. Their second album, I Am a Bird Now (2005), was a commercial and critical success, earning her the Mercury Music Prize.

In 2016, Anohni became the first openly transgender performer nominated for an Academy Award; she was nominated for the Academy Award for Best Original Song, along with J. Ralph, for the song "Manta Ray" in the film Racing Extinction. Her debut solo album, Hopelessness, was released in May 2016 to wide critical acclaim, including another nomination for the Mercury Music Prize and a Brit Award. In 2023, as Anohni and the Johnsons, the artist released her sixth album, My Back Was a Bridge for You to Cross.

== Early life ==
Anohni was born in Chichester, England, and identified as transgender from an early age. In 1977, her family moved to Amsterdam for a year, and then, in 1981, they moved to the San Francisco Bay Area of California, settling in San Jose, where Anohni attended Lincoln High School and studied music and was an avid record collector. Her mother Barbara is a photographer and her father Brendan was an IBM engineer and later a prominent Silicon Valley businessman who served as COO of Seagate Technology. She told The Telegraph in 2005, "I was listening to OMD, Kate Bush, Culture Club, Alison Moyet and especially Marc and the Mambas, which was this incredibly dark and emotional side project for Marc Almond." Anohni also recalled how she "saw [her] reflection" in Culture Club singer Boy George.

In 1990, Anohni moved to Manhattan to attend Experimental Theater Wing at New York University. In 1992 she founded the performance collective Blacklips, later known as Blacklips Performance Cult, with creative partner Johanna Constantine, and she spent the next several years singing in after-hours bars and clubs using pre-recorded cassettes as self-accompaniment as well as writing and directing late-night theatre productions.

== Musical career ==
=== Antony and the Johnsons ===
After being awarded a grant from New York Foundation for the Arts for the 1996 production of The Birth of Anne Frank/The Ascension of Marsha P. Johnson at Performance Space 122, Anohni solicited accompanying musicians to record a number of songs she wrote in the early 1990s. The ensemble performed for the first time as "Antony and the Johnsons" at The Kitchen as part of William Basinski's installation "Life on Mars" in 1997. In 1999, the group began to perform more frequently at venues such as Joe's Pub and The Knitting Factory in New York City. British experimental musician David Tibet of Current 93 heard the recording and offered to release it through his Durtro record label; the debut album, Antony and the Johnsons, was released in 2000. In 2001, Anohni released a follow-up EP through Durtro, I Fell in Love with a Dead Boy, which, in addition to the title track, included a cover of a David Lynch/Angelo Badalamenti song "Mysteries of Love", and a Current 93 song, "Soft Black Stars".

Antony and the Johnsons' 2005 album I Am a Bird Now featured guest performances by Lou Reed, Boy George, Rufus Wainwright and Devendra Banhart. The album was released in North America by Secretly Canadian Records and in Europe by Rough Trade. It won the UK's Mercury Prize and was named Album of the Year by Mojo magazine. The band toured North America, Europe, Australia and parts of South America for a year and a half in support of I am a Bird Now. The song "Bird Gerhl" was featured in the soundtrack for the movie V for Vendetta.

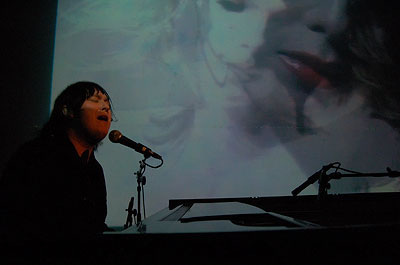
Anohni in 2008

Antony and the Johnsons collaborated with experimental filmmaker Charles Atlas and presented Turning in November 2006 in Rome, London, Paris, Madrid, and Braga, Portugal. The concert featured live video portraits of a group of women from the New York City underground. The Guardian called the piece "fragile, life affirming, and truly wonderful (five stars)" Le Monde in Paris hailed Turning as "Concert-manifeste transsexuel."

In 2007, Anohni created an original soundtrack for a video by Nick Knight featuring the designs of Hussein Chalayan. She collaborated in 2008 with Prada to create a song called "The Great White Ocean" for their promotional campaign.

Antony and the Johnsons' 5-song Another World EP was released on 7 October 2008. Antony and the Johnsons' third album, The Crying Light, was released on 19 January 2009. The album peaked at number 1 on the European Billboard charts. Anohni has described the album as being "about landscape and the future." The album was mixed by Bryce Goggin and includes arrangements by Nico Muhly. Ann Powers wrote of The Crying Light for the LA Times online, "it's the most personal environmentalist statement possible, making an unforeseen connection between queer culture's identity politics and the green movement. As music, it's simply exquisite – more controlled and considered than anything Antony and the Johnsons have done and sure to linger in the minds of listeners."

After touring throughout North America and Europe in support of their new album, Antony and the Johnsons presented a unique staging of "The Crying Light" with the Manchester Camerata at the Manchester Opera House for the 2009 Manchester International Festival. The concert hall was transformed with laser effects created by installation artist Chris Levine. Antony and the Johnsons went on to present concerts with symphonies across Europe in Summer 2009, including the Opera Orchestra of Lyon, the Metropole Orchestra, Roma Sinfonietta and the Montreux Jazz Festival Orchestra. At Salle Pleyel in Paris, Anohni appeared in a costume designed by Riccardo Tisci of Givenchy.

Late 2010 saw the release of Thank You for Your Love EP and in October the full-length album Swanlights on Secretly Canadian and Rough Trade. Abrams Books also published a book edition of Swanlights featuring Anohni's drawings and collages with photography by Don Felix Cervantes. In tandem with the release of Swanlights, Anohni curated a "takeover" of The Guardian's music desk, producing an array of articles and recordings about musicians, climate change awareness, the Two-spirit tradition in some Native American cultures, a 1995 video of Page Reynolds by Charles Atlas singing "River of Sorrow", and a tribute to Christopher Hitchens by Claywoman. At the end of October, Anohni performed a concert in front of Chiaki Nagano's 1973 film "Mr O’s Book of the Dead" at Lincoln Center in New York City in commemoration of the passing of Kazuo Ohno.

In January 2011, Anohni was a guest on Wintergasten, a program on Dutch Television's VPRO channel, and was interviewed by Leon Verdonschot discussing her political and ecological viewpoints in reference to different film clips.

Anohni performed at the TED conference in Long Beach in 2011 in a session on "Radical Collaboration".

During the 2011 Manchester International Festival, Anohni was musical director for The Life and Death of Marina Abramović, a biography of the 'Godmother' of performance art, re-imagined by director Robert Wilson and co-starring Willem DaFoe, Marina Abramović and Anohni. The piece has subsequently been staged in Madrid, Amsterdam, Antwerp, Basel, Toronto (as part of the Luminato Festival) and New York.

In January 2012, Antony and the Johnsons were presented by the Museum of Modern Art at Radio City Music Hall in "Swanlights", a collaboration with laser artist Chris Levine and set designer Carl Robertshaw. The performance was described by The New York Times in a review by Jon Parales entitled "Cries From the heart, Crashing Like Waves." This collaboration was also staged at the Royal Opera House in London in 2013 and at Teatro Real in Madrid in 2014.

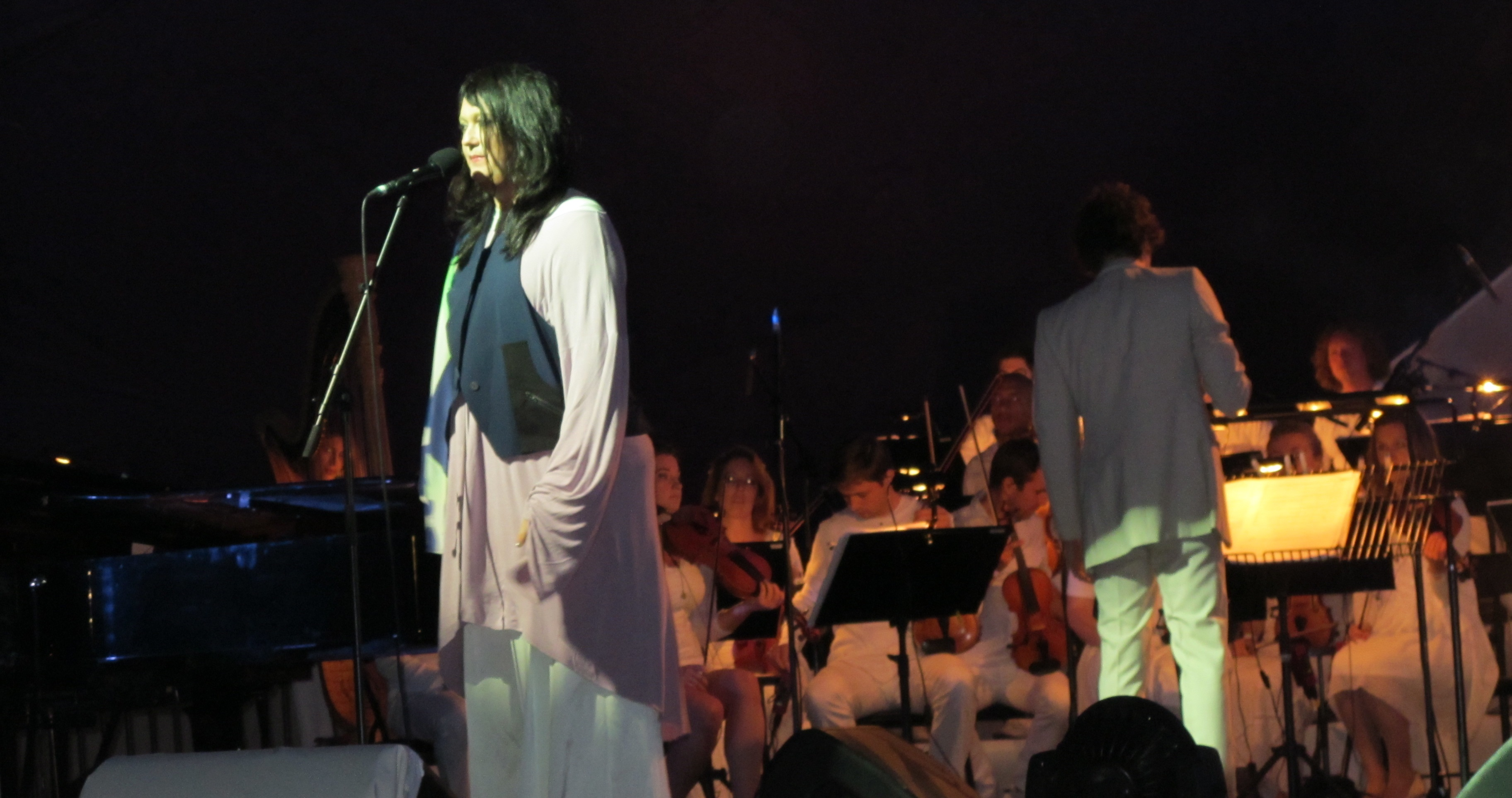
Antony and the Johnsons perform with the Heritage Orchestra in 2012

Antony and the Johnsons released a live symphonic album in August 2012 entitled Cut the World featuring the Danish Radio Orchestra. The album features a spoken track called "Future Feminism" in which Anohni elaborates on her view of the connection between feminism and ecology. A video for the song "Cut the World" directed by Nabil Elderkin features Willem Dafoe, Carice van Houten and Marina Abramović.

Anohni was the curator of Meltdown 2012 at the Southbank Centre in London, inviting artists including Diamanda Galás, Cocteau Twins, Marc and the Mambas, Buffy Sainte-Marie, Selda Bağcan, William Basinski and Marina Abramović. In the press release she stated, "The weather is changing and everybody knows it. I want to participate. What is my relationship and responsibility to the world around me? Frontier expressions of emotion and beauty can be fantastic tools with which to enter that discussion."

Anohni was "guest of honor" at the Melbourne Festival in October 2012, presenting a restaging of "Swanlights", as well as screening Charles Atlas' Turning, Lynette Wallworth's Coral: Rekindling Venus, and presenting Paradise, an exhibition of her drawings and collages.

Anohni performed with orchestra for the 2013 Spring Givenchy collection in Paris, singing You Are My Sister and expanding on the theme of "Future Feminism" in literature distributed at the event.

In June 2015, Antony and the Johnsons performed at Dark Mofo in Tasmania as a benefit in support of the Martu people of Parnngurr in Western Australia in their fight to prevent a uranium mine from being developed near their community by Canadian multinational Cameco and Mitsubishi. Anohni appeared with Martu representatives at a press conference at the MCA in Sydney and on ABC Australia's "Q and A" in further service of this cause.

Anohni collaborated with composer J. Ralph on the song "Manta Ray" from the environmental documentary Racing Extinction. The song received a nomination for Best Original Song at the 88th Academy Awards. Anohni released a statement expressing discomfort over the academy's decision to characterize her in the days leading up to the ceremony as having been "cut" from the line-up due to "time constraints", despite never actually having been asked to perform in the first place. She stated that "singing about eco-cide... might not sell advertising space" and that the system is one "of social oppression and diminished opportunities for transpeople that has been employed by capitalism in the U.S. to crush our dreams and our collective spirit". She did not attend the event.

=== Anohni ===
On 23 February 2015, Anohni announced her fifth album, Hopelessness, via the Antony and the Johnsons website and Facebook account. Co-produced by Anohni, Oneohtrix Point Never and Hudson Mohawke, it was her first album to be released under her name Anohni, one that she had been using in her personal life "for years". In the announcement, Anohni described the album as "an electronic record with some sharp teeth" and the UK's Independent described it as a "bitterly beautiful record". The Quietus explained, "Early interviews indicated a desire to create 'a dance / experimental electronic record with quite a dark thematic undertow', and in this regard Anohni and her collaborators have succeeded."

On 30 November 2015, Anohni released "4 Degrees", the first song from Hopelessness. Commenting on the album's lead single in a fan interview earlier in the year, Anohni had stated that she had "grown tired of grieving for humanity", adding that she felt she "was not being entirely honest by pretending that I am not a part of the problem. '4 Degrees' is kind of a brutal attempt to hold myself accountable, not just valorize my intentions but also reflect on the true impact of my behaviors."

On 9 March 2016, Anohni premiered the album's second single "Drone Bomb Me" on Annie Mac's show on BBC Radio 1 later that day, accompanied by a music video directed by Nabil Elderkin and starring English supermodel Naomi Campbell. The album Hopelessness was released on 6 May 2016 and was nominated for the 2016 Mercury Prize and a Brit. Anohni toured throughout Europe, the US and Australia in 2016, performing with her face obscured under a veil throughout the concert, in front of stark projections of a series of lip-synching women. The confrontational performance was described by The New York Times as a combination of "hard-core punk" and "radical empathy that's hard to find anywhere in pop." In early 2017 she went on to release a further EP entitled PARADISE, working with the same producers. The final track was awarded only to those who wrote to Anohni's email with "...a sentence or two what you care most about, or your hopes for the future. Send this to me instead of the dollar you used to send me in the olden days."

In 2018, for the occasion of her exhibition at Nikolaj Kunsthal in Copenhagen, Anohni released the track "Miracle Now" on YouTube, which features a video of 1990s New York transgender performance artist Page Reynolds, featured in The Johnsons' play MIRACLE NOW of 1996 as "The Last Dolphin."

In 2020 Anohni released a single "It's All Over Now, Baby Blue" by Bob Dylan and "Be My Husband", originally by Nina Simone. In the days after that year's Republican National Convention she released a protest single via YouTube called "R.N.C. 2020" with an accompanying essay published in The Guardian

In October 2021 Anohni scored the multidisciplinary artists collective Drift's sculptural installation Fragile Future at The Shed. In January 2022 Anohni scored the Valentino Spring fashion show "Anatomy of Couture". In January 2023, Rolling Stone ranked Anohni at number 192 on its list of the 200 Greatest Singers of All Time.

=== Anohni and the Johnsons ===
On 16 May 2023, Anohni announced the reappearance of her band, renaming it Anohni and the Johnsons. The band released a new single titled "It Must Change", produced by Jimmy Hogarth, with a music video starring British trans activist Munroe Bergdorf. The New York Times stated that "[a] cloud of elegy hangs over the song [...] as over the warming planet, while Anohni — fiercely, tenderly — seems to sing in the voice of Mother Earth herself". The band also unveiled an upcoming album entitled My Back Was a Bridge for You to Cross, featuring an image of Marsha P. Johnson by Alvin Baltrop on the cover, to be released by Rough Trade and Secretly Canadian on 7 July 2023. Louder Than War wrote that the album "touch[es] on elements of American soul, British folk and experimental music." Music videos followed for "Sliver of Ice", "Why Am I Alive Now?" (directed by Hunter Schafer), and "Scapegoat", directed by Sara Hegarty. The album was chosen as No. 1 Album of 2023 by The New Yorker.

Anohni and the Johnsons toured Europe and North America in 2024. Bob Gendron of the Chicago Tribune wrote "Anohni and the Johnsons deliver on promise with ‘It’s Time to Feel What’s Really Happening’...The timing of Anohni's declarations couldn't be more necessary. It represented the unvarnished truth. Performing their first local show in more than 15 years, the transgender singer and her group delivered nothing but sheer emotion during one of the most courageous, vital and provocative concerts to grace a Chicago stage in recent memory."

In November 2024, Anohni presented 2 concerts of songs by Lou Reed, her friend and mentor. The Guardian described the event as " a uniquely gifted interpreter pay[ing] homage to mentor Lou Reed... she's evidently in her element, taking risks with the song's melody and phrasing that justify the gig's appearance as part of the London jazz festival: you're very aware of an artist pushing at the boundaries and structure of a song on the spot...And sometimes, her reinterpretations seem faintly miraculous. Anohni is every bit as gifted an interpreter as you might imagine, and in Reed's oeuvre, she's found a perfect vehicle."

In 2025 Anohni presented a new work "Mourning the Great Barrier Reef" at the Sydney opera house. Describing the project as seeking to create a "ceremony fit for the purpose of grieving a loss of such monumental scale," she spent several weeks in May filming the declining condition of the reef from the research station on Lizard Island and interviewing experts in the field of marine biology on their sense of the GBR's condition and future prospects. The work was described in The Australian as "a somber meditation on ecological collapse, despair and complicity." In the months that followed Anohni presented the films throughout Europe, including Primavera Sound and Glastonbury, which Mojo declared to be "One of the most extraordinary performances Worthy Farm has ever witnessed."

The concert was accompanied by large scale projections of the Great Barrier Reef in states of decay and abundance. "It is like when someone’s dying, sometimes they show the gold of the soul," Anohni says. "They throw their life force into a final expression. That’s what coral bleaching is … she’s saying goodbye."

Of the concerts, The Guardian stated "Her ability to intertwine personal emotions with broader ecological concerns is what makes her work so compelling. She doesn’t simply present facts and statistics; rather, she invites listeners to connect with the emotional impact of environmental loss. The music becomes a shared lament, a communal acknowledgment of the profound and irreversible changes occurring on our planet."

== Musical collaborations ==
Anohni occasionally collaborates with other musicians. In 2003, she began working with Lou Reed as a supporting vocalist on the Animal Serenade tour and performed on a number of tracks on Reed's album The Raven. She sang backup (with Sharon Jones and a children's choir) in Lou Reed's first full performance of his album Berlin at St Ann's Warehouse in New York in December 2006 and at The State Theatre in Sydney, Australia in January 2007. Anohni sang "If It Be Your Will" as a part of Hal Willner's Came So Far For Beauty concerts at the Sydney Opera House in 2005; this performance was later featured in the film Leonard Cohen: I'm Your Man, a tribute to Leonard Cohen.

In 2006, she collaborated with Icelandic musician Björk in recording sessions in Jamaica and Iceland. The songs, "The Dull Flame of Desire" and "My Juvenile", were featured on her 2007 album Volta. The two also dueted on the songs at several of Björk's concerts, including London, Reykjavík and New York. In 2015, Anohni collaborated with Björk on Vulnicura's "Atom Dance".

Also in 2006 she co-produced Songs from the Coalmine Canary by Little Annie, also playing piano, singing backup vocals, and co-writing several songs on the album. The song "Strangelove", co-written by Anohni and Little Annie, was used as the soundtrack for Levi's "Dangerous Liaisons" advertising campaign in 2007, garnering several awards, including the Cannes Lions – International Advertising Festival, 2007 (Bronze Lion) for "Best Use of Music".

In 2008, Anohni was featured on five tracks from the self-titled disco album Hercules and Love Affair, most notably on "Blind", which was voted best track of 2008 by Pitchfork Media and ranked at number 2 on the "10 Best Singles of 2008" list by American magazine Entertainment Weekly.

Anohni worked with Bernard Butler on some acoustic sessions for the radio station XFM. In June 2009, she appeared live with Yoko Ono and the Plastic Ono Band at Ornette Coleman's Meltdown festival at the Royal Festival Hall, singing Ono's "Toyboat". In the same year, she collaborated with Bryce Dessner on the Bob Dylan song "I Was Young When I Left Home" for the AIDS benefit album Dark Was the Night, produced by the Red Hot Organization.

On 6 March 2013, Anohhi and the Johnsons performed Candy Says with Lou Reed at his last performance before his death in Paris, at the Salle Pleyel, a classical-music concert hall. In response to his death later that year she put out a statement on Facebook stating, "Lou was like a father to me. I have never felt so perceived and loved for who I actually am by a man than by Lou Reed. He fought tirelessly for me to have a place in the daylight culture. My career would never have taken off without Lou’s tremendous influence." The song "Sliver of Ice" off the album My Back Was a Bridge for You to Cross was inspired by Reed. "He was a hardcore kind of guy and these moments were transforming the way he was seeing things. I wrote ‘Sliver of Ice,’ remembering those words of his."

On 2 September 2013, she performed at the Verona Arena with the Italian musician and songwriter Franco Battiato. The concert was made into the live album Del suo veloce volo, released that November by Universal.

In 2017, Anohni appeared on Cocorosie's politically charged single "Smoke 'em Out" with Big Freedia, Cakes da Killa and others.

In June 2022, Anohni appeared on Hercules and Love Affair's album In Amber. She co-composed and sang on six tracks including the singles "Poisonous Storytelling", and "One" collaborating with drummer Budgie of Siouxsie and the Banshees and the Creatures.

== Visual art and performance ==
In July 2008, Anohni debuted a number of self-produced visual artworks in a Brussels exhibition curated by Jerome Sans. Working with longtime collaborator/photographer Don Felix Cervantes and adviser Joie Iacono, she went on to have solo exhibitions at Isis Gallery in London and Accademia Albertina in Turin, Italy.

In April 2009, she curated an exhibition entitled "6 Eyes" at the Agnes B. Galerie Du Jour in Paris. In this exhibition she drew connections between her own work and the work of artists Peter Hujar, Kiki Smith, Barbara Cummard, Alice O'Malley, James Elaine and William Basinski.

A solo exhibition of Anohni's drawings and sculptures opened at the Hammer Museum in Los Angeles in January 2012.

A solo exhibition of Anohni's drawings and sculptures opened at Sikkema Jenkins Gallery in New York in June 2013. Roberta Smith of The New York Times said of the show "Sometimes talent is concentrated, sometimes it spans multiple mediums. That of Anohni, singer-songwriter and leading light of the musical group Antony and the Johnsons, is the spanning kind. She is also a serious visual artist. Her first solo show in New York follows exhibitions in Los Angeles and London, and introduces a sensibility that is consistent with her heart-rending songs and warbling delivery: fragile, falling apart but surviving, even defiant."

A further exhibition that included Anohni's drawings opened in September 2014 at Sikkemma Jenkins gallery in New York.

Collaborating with Johanna Constantine, Kembra Pfahler, and Bianca and Sierra Casady, Anohni co-presented the exhibition and performance series "Future Feminism" at The Hole in New York in September 2014. Thirteen rose quartz sculptures were displayed during the two-week event series, and artists including Lorraine O'Grady, Lydia Lunch, Kiki Smith, Marina Abramović, Terence Koh and Narcissister made presentations.

In Autumn 2016, Anohni presented "My Truth" across seven rooms at the Kunsthalle Bielefeld in Germany. On the first and second floors of the museum, Anohni also curated work by Peter Hujar, Kazuo Ohno and James Elaine.

Anohni was artist-in-residence at European Capital of Culture, Aarhus 2017. In August she co-presented "FUTURE FEMINISM" at 'O' Space in Aarhus with Kembra Pfahler and Johanna Constantine. The program featured 25 lectures, performances and workshops, including a presentations by FEMEN and Victoria Kawesa from the Feminist Party of Sweden, Kembra Pfahler's "Performance Art 101" and a course in self-defense.

Anohni presented a multimedia exhibition at Nikolaj Kunsthal in Copenhagen in May 2018. The installation included a collection of framed newspaper articles on the passing of Marsha P. Johnson, global warming and the melting polar icecap, the beginnings of the AIDS crisis, and cold war nuclear waste disposal. A series of nine archival video loops revisited Anohni's 1996 production "Miracle Now" with her New York performance group The Johnsons, featuring performers and collaborators including Dr. Julia Yasuda, Johanna Constantine, Page, Lavinia Co-op, and Amanda Lepore. Another gallery contained archives and visual materials from her work as a playwright and director in the New York experimental theater and nightclub scene during the 1990s. Three further galleries housed assemblies of Anohni's paintings, sculptures, and videos.

In April 2019, Anohni mounted an exhibition entitled "LOVE" at The Kitchen in New York City. She wrote of the exhibition in the program:

"We face grave uncertainty about the existence of a future. Can we reorganize our compulsion to cut the throat of nature? I keep asking myself, 'What Is Really Happening?' The same illness infecting the biosphere has grown around the systems that support my own contemporary life, and a bloom of hopelessness opened up in me. I think about holding space for vanishing, of people, of communities, of biodiversity, in a way that opens into spectral time, leaking all points at once."

In part a memorial for her longtime collaborator Julia Yasuda, Anohni published a book of photos by Julia's wife, Erika Yasuda, to coincide with the event. Anohni also staged a play entitled "She Who Saw Beautiful Things" which included performances by Charles Atlas, Lorraine O'Grady, Connie Fleming, Laurie Anderson, and others.

Anohni was artistic advisor for the Holland Festival in June 2023 and invited artists including Pfahler, Constantine, Lynette Wallworth, William Basinski and Adrienne Maree Brown to participate. She oversaw a restaging of the group show Future Feminism, as well as an exhibit of photos, drawings and sculptures featuring Julia Yasuda, called "She Who Saw Beautiful Things" at Huis Willet-Holthuysen. She also produced "Disintegration Loops (for Euterpestraat)", a symphonic staging of work by William Basinski, as a free outdoor concert and community conversation in the neighbourhood where Anohni had lived for a year as a child, across the street from a building that was headquarters of the SS during the Nazi occupation.

== Gender identity ==
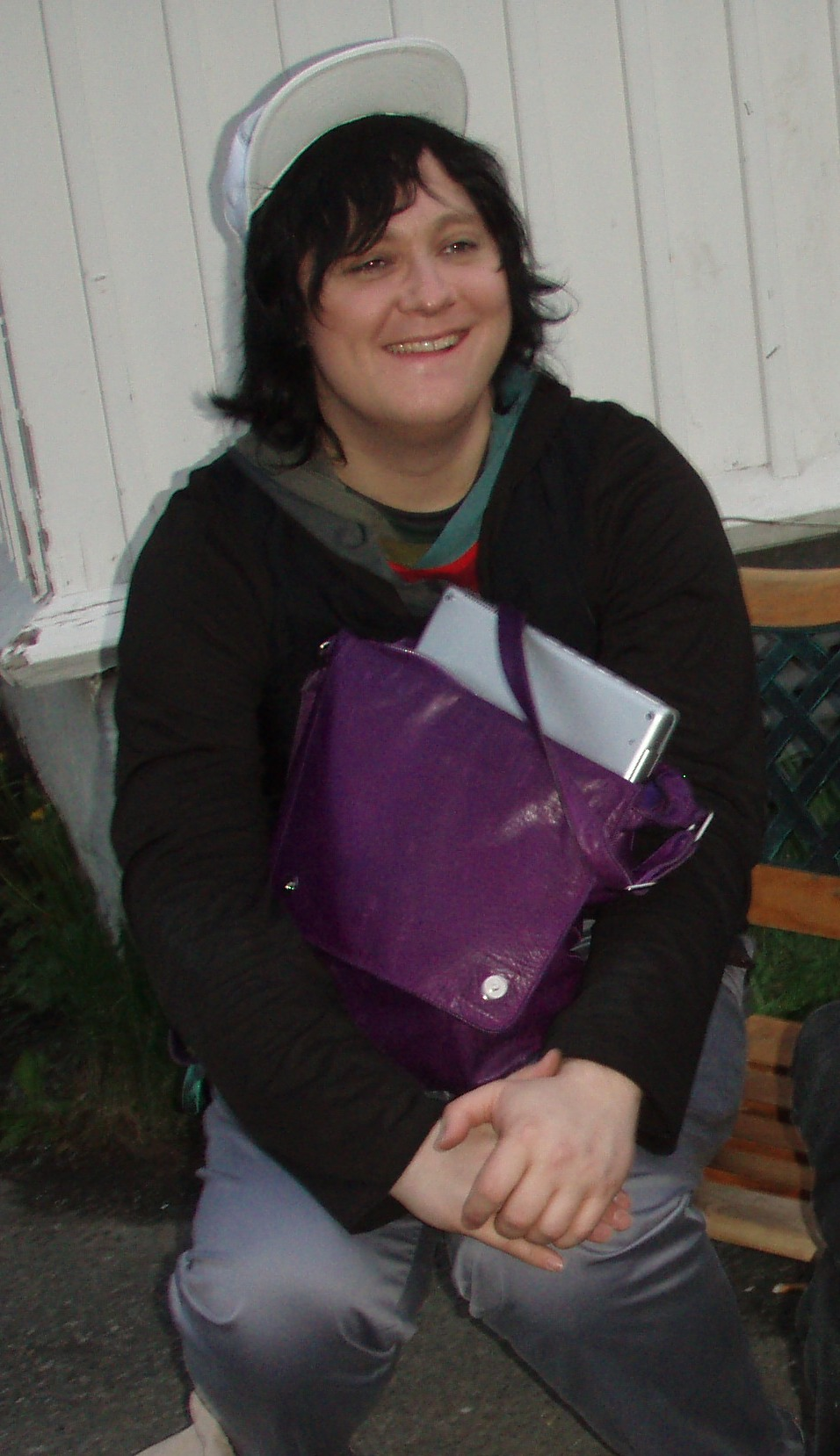
Anohni in Lillehammer, Norway (2007)

Anohni is transgender and uses the pronouns she/her. In 2005, 11 years before she publicly changed her pronouns, Anohni said in an interview with Magnet Magazine "I prefer [the transgender] label to 'gay' (...) Listen, I believe that we all contain a family within us: a mother, a father, a son, a daughter. As far as how it affects my music, I think it's the same as in the case of being an immigrant. When you are outside the norm, it tends to make you more introspective." The Wall Street Journal reported in 2015 that "Anohni, 44, (was) now openly transgender", mistaking her change in name and pronoun as her first public statement of trans-identification.

Six years earlier, on Sweden's Face Culture interview series in 2008, Anohni said:

"(Being transgender is) just a very integral part of who I am. I never had to really come out because it was always very apparent to everyone. The thing about transgender people is you can't really hide it... The language to talk about these things is really growing, even in the last five or ten years, and the popular consciousness about these things has really grown…. I am lucky that the window opened and there's a platform for someone like me to be able to talk about my experience in a straightforward way. It's also really good for other transgender people to feel represented, because it's a group, even within the family, that, people try to make invisible."

In an interview with Flavorwire in November 2014, she stated, "My closest friends and family use feminine pronouns for me. I have not mandated the press [to] do one thing or another... In my personal life I prefer 'she'. I think words are important. To call a person by their chosen gender is to honor their spirit, their life and contribution. 'He' is an invisible pronoun for me; it negates me."

In 2016, the artist announced that she was changing her name to Anohni and elaborated on her views of being transgender to The Guardian:

"The trans condition is a beautiful mystery; it’s one of nature’s best ideas. What an incredible impulse, that compels a five-year-old child to tell its parents it isn’t what they think it is. Given just a tiny bit of oxygen, those children can flourish and be such a gift. They give other people license to explore themselves more deeply, allowing the colours in their own psyche to flourish."

== Discography ==
=== Solo albums ===
- Hopelessness (2016)
- Paradise EP (2017)

=== With Anohni and the Johnsons ===
- Antony and the Johnsons (2000)
- I Am a Bird Now (2005)
- The Crying Light (2009)
- Swanlights (2010)
- My Back Was a Bridge for You to Cross (2023)

=== Other recordings ===
Song	Album	Artist	Year
"Blood on the Door"	Breadcrumb Sins	Jamie Saft	2002
"You Stand Above Me" – Antony (1:36)	Live at St. Olaves	split EP with Current 93	2003
"The Lake" – Antony (4:48)	Live at St. Olaves	split EP with Current 93	2003
"Cripple and the Starfish" – Antony (4:51)	Live at St. Olaves	split EP with Current 93	2003
"Perfect Day"	The Raven	Lou Reed	2003
"Candy Says"	Animal Serenade	Lou Reed	2004
"A Little Bit of Time"	Red Tape	Brooks	2004
"Old Whore's Diet"	Want Two	Rufus Wainwright	2004
"Beautiful Boyz"	Noah's Ark	CocoRosie	2005
"Happy Xmas (War Is Over)" with Boy George	Help!: A Day in the Life	War Child album	2005
"Idumea" / "The Beautiful Dancing Dust"	Black Ships Ate the Sky	Current 93	2006
(several)	Songs from the Coalmine Canary	Little Annie	2006
"Semen Song for James Bidgood"	The Rose Has Teeth in the Mouth of a Beast	Matmos	2006
"Nighttime And Morning"	Desert Doughnuts	Metallic Falcons	2006
"I Defy"	Real Life	Joan as Policewoman	2006
"If It Be Your Will"	Leonard Cohen: I'm Your Man	Leonard Cohen tribute	2006
"One More Try"	Dial 0	My Robot Friend	2006
"Living the Blues"	Trouble: The Jamie Saft Trio Plays Bob Dylan	Jamie Saft Trio	2006
"Lowlands Low"	Rogue's Gallery: Pirate Ballads, Sea Songs, and Chanteys	Bryan Ferry	2006
"Leave Her Johnny"	Rogue's Gallery: Pirate Ballads, Sea Songs, and Chanteys	Lou Reed	2006
"Keep in Touch"	Speaks Volumes	Nico Muhly	2006
"All There Is to Tell"	Golden Boy	Reuben Butchart	2007
"The Dull Flame of Desire" / "My Juvenile"	Volta	Björk	2007
"The Ballad of the Sad Young Men"	Stardom Road	Marc Almond	2007
"Beauty"	Versatile Heart	Linda Thompson	2007
"Knockin' on Heaven's Door"	I'm Not There	soundtrack	2007
(all)	The Snow Abides	Michael Cashmore	2007
"God with No Tear"	Visionaire	53 Sound	2007
"Del suo veloce volo"	Fleurs 2	Franco Battiato	2008
"Ooh Baby Baby"	Easy Come, Easy Go	Marianne Faithfull	2008
"Will I Ever Learn"	Was muss muss	Herbert Grönemeyer	2008
"Be Good to Earth This Season" with Kría Brekkan	split 7-inch single	Reverend Green	2008
"I Was Young When I Left Home"	Dark Was The Night	charity album	2009
"Forgiveness"	Heart	Elisa	2009
"Nessun Dorma"	Lavazza campaign	with The Roma Sinfonietta Orchestra	2009
"Stranger Perfumes" & "Another Day in America"	Homeland	Laurie Anderson	2010
"Fletta"	Swanlights	Björk	2010
"Returnal"	Returnal	Oneohtrix Point Never	2010
"Who am I to feel so free?"	Talk About Body	MEN	2011
"Prisoner of Love"	See the Light	Jessica 6	2011
"Tearz for Animals"	We Are on Fire – Single	CocoRosie	2012
"Particle of Light"	See You on the Ice	Carice van Houten	2012
"Janitor of Lunacy"	Desertshore / The Final Report	X-TG	2012
"Poison"	Tales of a GrassWidow	CocoRosie	2013
"Mourned Winter Then"	I Am the Last of All the Field That Fell: A Channel	Current 93	2014
"Atom Dance"	Vulnicura	Björk	2015
"Indian Steps"	Lantern	Hudson Mohawke	2015
"Manta Ray"	Racing Extinction	J. Ralph	2015
"Smoke 'em Out"	single	CocoRosie	2017
"Black Snow", "We'll Take It", "Same" & "Still Stuff That Doesn't Happen"	Age Of	Oneohtrix Point Never	2018
"New Brighton"	You Will Not Die	Nakhane	2018
"Raise Me Up"	Change	Hercules and Love Affair	2019
"The Night Has Rushed In"	The Night Has Rushed In	Michael Cashmore	2021
"Woman"	The Versions	Neneh Cherry	2022
"Essence"	Hi-Def Femme	Nomi Ruiz	2022
"French Lessons"	Stay Close to Music	Mykki Blanco	2022
"Going to a Town"	Folkocracy	Rufus Wainwright	2023

== Awards and nominations ==
Year	Awards	Work	Category	Result
2005	Mercury Prize	I Am a Bird Now	Album of the Year	Won
2006	Brit Awards	Herself	British Male Solo Artist	Nominated
2008	UK Music Video Awards	"Blind" (with Hercules and Love Affair)	Best Pop Video – UK	Nominated
2008	Best Art Vinyl	"Blind" (with Hercules and Love Affair)	Best Vinyl Art	Nominated
2011	New York Music Awards	Herself	Best Alternative Male Vocalist	Won
2016	Academy Awards	"Manta Ray"	Best Original Song	Nominated
2016	Mercury Prize	Hopelessness	Album of the Year	Nominated
2016	Rober Awards Music Poll	Herself	Best Female Artist	Nominated
2016	Rober Awards Music Poll	Herself	Best Live Artist	Nominated
2016	Rober Awards Music Poll	Herself	Best Pop Artist	Won
2016	Rober Awards Music Poll	"4 Degrees"	Song of the Year	Nominated
2016	Rober Awards Music Poll	Hopelessness	Album of the Year	Nominated
2017	A2IM Libera Awards	Hopelessness	Best Dance/Electronica Album	Nominated
2017	A2IM Libera Awards	"Drone Bomb Me"	Video of the Year	Nominated
2017	A2IM Libera Awards	"Drone Bomb Me"	Video of the Year (Fan Vote)	Nominated
2017	Brit Awards	Herself	British Female Solo Artist	Nominated
2017	Rober Awards Music Poll	Paradise	Best EP	Nominated
2018	Queerty Awards	Herself	Musician	Nominated
