= Swanlights =

Studio album by Antony and the Johnsons
- Released: October 11, 2010
- Genre: Chamber folk
- Length: 46:21
- Label: Secretly Canadian
- Producer: Anohni

Antony and the Johnsons chronology
The Crying Light (2009)	Swanlights (2010)	Cut the World (2012)

Singles from Swanlights
- 1. "Thank You for Your Love" Released: August 30, 2010; 2. "Swanlights" Released: April 25, 2011

Swanlights is the fourth studio album by Antony and the Johnsons, released on October 12, 2010, worldwide through Secretly Canadian, and October 11, 2010, in the United Kingdom through Rough Trade. To accompany the release, the band produced a 144-page art book also titled Swanlights, which includes paintings, collages, photography, and writing by Anohni. The album was preceded by the lead single/EP Thank You for Your Love, released on August 30, 2010, in the UK and 1 September in the US.

== Artwork and book ==
The Swanlights project consists of music and artwork that Anohni has been focusing on for the last three years. Many of the songs that appear on the album had been recorded during tracking for The Crying Light while two of the tracks stem from live recordings in Copenhagen and London in 2008 and 2009. Anohni undertook a project to create a companion piece to the Swanlights album in the form of an art book in collaboration with Abrams Image Publishing, Garrick Gott and Joie Iacono, incorporating drawings, paintings, portraits and poems from a mass of work that was creating during recordings of "The Crying Light" and "Swanlights". In interviews, Anohni described her work on Swanlights as "a collision between joy and a sense of hopelessness". Anohni said she was struggling to come to terms with the idea that she was part of a society that was having a "virulent" impact on the earth.

In 2009, the New York Times wrote a feature on Anohni and her earliest exhibition of her work at the ISIS Gallery in London entitled The Creek. Artwork from Swanlights has subsequently been shown at the Agnes B Gallery in Paris, in Turin, and by curator Jerome Sans in the exhibition "It's Only Rock And Roll Baby" in Brussels and Milan.

== Concert ==
One special event was performed in support of Swanlights at Lincoln Center in New York City on 30 October 2010 with the Orchestra of St. Luke's, conducted by Rob Moose, with a special screening as a backdrop of "Mr. O's Book of the Dead" by Chiaki Nagano. Anohni dedicated the evening to Kazuo Ohno who died in June of that year. Anohni said this about Kazuo's passing, "I want to express my sorrow at the passing of Kazuo Ohno, who died today in a hospital in Yokohama at the age of 103. He was my hero and my teacher. I feel so honored to have had the opportunity to meet him and get a little closer to his family and his work earlier this year when we visited the Kazuo Ohno Dance Studio in Japan. I thank him for awakening a sense of a child inside me. I will dream of him forever, and I will search for his footsteps in the dust of life before me. I wish only for his flourishing joy."

The evenings songs were arranged by Anohni, Nico Muhly and Rob Moose consisting of tracks spanning Anohni's four albums.

== Critical reception ==
Professional ratings
Review scores
Source	Rating
AllMusic	4/5 stars
BBC Music	(favorable)
Entertainment.ie	4/5 stars
Mojo	4/5 stars
Pitchfork	7.7/10
Prefix Magazine	8.5/10
Spin	8/10
Tiny Mix Tapes	4.5/5 marks
Uncut Magazine	4/5 stars

Stereogum placed Swanlights in its Top 50 Albums of the year at No. 8. Tiny Mix Tapes gave Swanlights a 4.5/5 saying that "yet another gorgeous creation by one of the most unique artists of the 2000s." Pitchfork's review stated "Swanlights might be [Anohni]'s richest album yet, with musical and thematic charms that take their time to take their hold...." Mojo scored Swanlights with 4 out of 5 stars saying, "Death, love, the ghosts they leave behind; these are grand themes, and Antony channels their spirit with magical grace."

In October 2010, Anohni was invited to "takeover" The Guardian's music and arts page that ran for weeks leading up to the release of Swanlights. The takeover consisted of a slide show of Anohni's artwork with narration by Anohni of selections from the Swanlights book, a phone conversation between Anohni and Björk, an essay on the environment vs capitalism by Jerry Mander and several other articles dealing with song writing, Marina Abramović, videos and more.

== Track listing ==
All tracks are written by Anohni, except where noted.

No.	Title	Writer(s)	Length
1.	"Everything Is New"		4:32
2.	"The Great White Ocean"		4:59
3.	"Ghost"	Anohni; Nico Muhly	3:08
4.	"I'm in Love"		3:52
5.	"Violetta"		0:35
6.	"Swanlights"		6:08
7.	"The Spirit Was Gone"		3:17
8.	"Thank You for Your Love"		4:14
9.	"Flétta"	Anohni; Björk	4:23
10.	"Salt Silver Oxygen"	Anohni; Muhly	3:52
11.	"Christina's Farm"		7:21
Total length:			46:21

iTunes LP deluxe edition bonus tracks
No.	Title	Writer(s)	Original album	Length
12.	"You Are the Treasure"		Thank You for Your Love (EP)	2:09
13.	"My Lord My Love"		Thank You for Your Love (EP)	3:14
14.	"Pressing On"	Bob Dylan	Saved	4:26
15.	"Imagine"	John Lennon	Imagine	4:36
Total length:				60:46

- All songs included on Hardcover Edition except "Flétta" by Anohni and Björk.

== Charts ==
=== Weekly charts ===
Chart (2010)	Peak position
Austrian Albums (Ö3 Austria)	30
Belgian Albums (Ultratop Flanders)	5
Belgian Albums (Ultratop Wallonia)	44
Danish Albums (Hitlisten)	20
Dutch Albums (Album Top 100)	10
French Albums (SNEP)	16
German Albums (Offizielle Top 100)	29
Irish Albums (IRMA)	22
Italian Albums (FIMI)	14
Norwegian Albums (VG-lista)	4
Scottish Albums (Official Charts)	42
Spanish Albums (Promusicae)	11
Swedish Albums (Sverigetopplistan)	9
Swiss Albums (Schweizer Hitparade)	32
UK Albums (Official Charts)	28
US Billboard 200	122
US Top Alternative Albums (Billboard)	25
US Independent Albums (Billboard)	22
US Top Rock Albums (Billboard)	45

=== Year-end charts ===
Chart (2010)	Position
Belgian Albums (Ultratop Flanders)	96

In 2011 it was awarded a gold certification from the Independent Music Companies Association which indicated sales of at least 75,000 copies throughout Europe.
