= Antony and the Johnsons (album) =

Studio album by Antony and the Johnsons
- Released: 2000
- Recorded: December 1997–October 1998
- Genre: Baroque pop
- Length: 34:48
- Label: Durtro
- Producer: Anohni

Antony and the Johnsons chronology
| Antony and the Johnsons (2000) | I Fell in Love with a Dead Boy (2001) |

Singles from Antony and the Johnsons
- 1. "Cripple and the Starfish" Released: 1998

Professional ratings
Review scores
| Source | Rating |
|---|---|
| AllMusic | 4/5 stars |

Antony and the Johnsons is the debut album by Anohni and the Johnsons, formerly known as Antony and the Johnsons. It was recorded in 1998 and released in 2000.

== Release ==
The album was released in 2000 on David Tibet's label Durtro. Antony and the Johnsons was reissued by Secretly Canadian in 2004.

== Track listing ==
All tracks are written by Anohni.

| No. | Title | Length |
|---|---|---|
| 1. | "Twilight" | 3:49 |
| 2. | "Cripple and the Starfish" | 4:11 |
| 3. | "Hitler in My Heart" | 3:32 |
| 4. | "Atrocities" | 3:53 |
| 5. | "River of Sorrow" | 4:03 |
| 6. | "Rapture" | 3:57 |
| 7. | "Deeper than Love" | 4:40 |
| 8. | "Divine" | 3:13 |
| 9. | "Blue Angel" | 3:35 |
| Total length: | | 34:48 |

== Personnel ==
Main personnel

- Anohni Hegarty – voice, piano
- François Gehin – bass
- Vicky Leavitt – cello
- William Basinski – clarinet
- Barb Morrison – clarinet, saxophone
- Tahrah Cohen – drums
- Mariana Davenport – flute
- Charles Neiland – guitar (effects)
- Baby Dee – harp
- Cady Finlayson – violin
- Liz Maranville – violin

Additional personnel

- Alan Douches – engineering
- Erika Larsen – engineering
- Rich Lamb – engineering
- Roger Fife – engineering
- Steve Regina – engineering
- Denis Blackham – mastering
- Hahn Rowe – mixing (1–6, 8, 9)
