= I Am a Bird Now =

Studio album by Antony and the Johnsons
- Released: February 1, 2005
- Recorded: 2004
- Genre: Chamber pop
- Length: 35:27
- Label: Secretly Canadian
- Producer: Anohni

Antony and the Johnsons chronology
The Lake (2004)	I Am a Bird Now (2005)	Hope There's Someone (2005)

Singles from I Am a Bird Now
- 1. "Hope There's Someone" Released: June 7, 2005; 2. "You Are My Sister" Released: October 25, 2005

I Am a Bird Now is the second studio album by Anohni's band Antony and the Johnsons, released on February 1, 2005, by Secretly Canadian. After it won the 2005 Mercury Prize, the record shot up the UK albums chart from No. 135 to No. 16 in one week, the biggest jump in the history of the prize. As of September 2011, UK sales stood at 220,000 copies.

I Am a Bird Now features guest appearances by Rufus Wainwright, Devendra Banhart, Boy George and Lou Reed. The cover is a photograph by Peter Hujar of Warhol superstar Candy Darling on her deathbed.

== Reception ==
Professional ratings
Aggregate scores
Source	Rating
Metacritic	88/100
Review scores
Source	Rating
AllMusic	4/5 stars
Entertainment Weekly	B+
Drowned in Sound	10/10
The Guardian	4/5 stars
Los Angeles Times	3.5/4 stars
Mojo	5/5 stars
NME	7/10
Pitchfork	8.6/10
Rolling Stone	4/5 stars
Spin	A−

I Am a Bird Now received very positive reviews. On the review aggregate site Metacritic, the album has a score of 88 out of 100, indicating "universal acclaim".

Drowned in Sound's Anthony Gibbons gave the album a score of 10/10, writing "It's not an exaggeration. This isn't hype. I Am A Bird Now is a beautiful, emotive, glorious, and sometimes sinister album that will top many a critic's list come the end-of-year polls, and justifiably so." Tiny Mix Tapes also gave the album a perfect score, writing "This music grabs a hold of you and doesn't let go. It feels timeless and gorgeous and bigger than life. It may not be 'soul' in the strict, music appreciation 101 sense, but it could make even the most jaded atheist approach a metaphysical regard... I'd put on my critic's cap and dive into scrutiny, but I am too enraptured by this artist's music." Pitchfork's Brandon Stosuy praised the vocals, writing "The ultimate draw is [Anohni's] voice, and within the first two seconds of the album, it should be very clear to even the most unaware newbies that [Anohni] has an amazing Nina Simone/Brian Ferry [sic]/Jimmy Scott vibrato, a multi-octave siren that would sound painfully lovely no matter what [she] was saying."

The album has appeared on several end of year lists. Mojo named I Am a Bird Now the best album of 2005. Pitchfork ranked the album No. 5 on its list of the top 50 albums of 2005. On the same website, the track "Hope There's Someone" was ranked No. 28 on their list of the Top 500 Songs of the 2000s and was selected as 2005's best single. In 2019, the album was ranked 40th on The Guardian's 100 Best Albums of the 21st Century list.

=== Influence ===
The song "For Today I Am a Boy" is the namesake for the book For Today I Am a Boy, by Kim Fu. The song's lyrics are quoted in the novel's epigraph.

== Track listing ==
All tracks are written by Anohni.

I Am a Bird Now track listing
No.	Title	Length
1.	"Hope There's Someone"	4:21
2.	"My Lady Story"	3:33
3.	"For Today I Am a Boy"	2:36
4.	"Man Is the Baby"	4:09
5.	"You Are My Sister"	3:59
6.	"What Can I Do?"	1:40
7.	"Fistful of Love"	5:52
8.	"Spiralling"	4:25
9.	"Free at Last"	1:36
10.	"Bird Gerhl"	3:14

== Personnel ==
The following people contributed to I Am a Bird Now:

=== Antony and the Johnsons ===
- Anohni Hegarty – organ, piano, vocals
- Tahrah Cohen – drums
- Julia Kent – cello
- Parker Kindred – drums (track 7)
- Jeff Langston – bass
- Maxim Moston – violin
- Joan Wasser – viola
- Doug Wieselman – saxophone

=== Additional personnel ===
- Devendra Banhart – guitar (track 5), vocals (track 8)
- Steve Bernstein – horn
- John Bollinger – drums (track 5)
- Keith Bonner – flute
- Boy George – vocals (track 5)
- Danielle Farina – viola (tracks 2, 9)
- Jason Hart – piano (track 6)
- Rainy Orteca – bass (track 7)
- Lou Reed – guitar and vocals (track 7)
- Paul Shapiro – horn
- Rufus Wainwright – vocals (track 6)
- Julia Yasuda – Morse code, vocals (track 9)
- Emery Dobyns – engineer and mixer
- Doug Henderson – mixer and mastering

== Charts ==
=== Weekly charts ===
Weekly chart performance for I Am a Bird Now
Chart (2005–2006)	Peak position
Austrian Albums (Ö3 Austria)	71
Belgian Albums (Ultratop Flanders)	16
Danish Albums (Hitlisten)	38
Dutch Albums (Album Top 100)	58
French Albums (SNEP)	45
Irish Albums (IRMA)	17
Italian Albums (FIMI)	60
Norwegian Albums (VG-lista)	4
Scottish Albums (Official Charts)	16
Swedish Albums (Sverigetopplistan)	22
UK Albums (Official Charts)	16
UK Independent Albums (Official Charts)	1

=== Year-end charts ===
Year-end chart performance for I Am a Bird Now
Chart (2006)	Position
Belgian Albums (Ultratop Flanders)	68
French Albums (SNEP)	196

=== Singles ===
Chart performance for singles from I Am a Bird Now
Year	Song	Peak positions
Year	Song	UK
2005	"Hope There's Someone"	44
2005	"You Are My Sister"	39

== Certifications and sales ==
Certifications and sales for I Am a Bird Now
Region	Certification	Certified units/sales
Norway (IFPI Norway)	Gold	20,000^{*}
Sweden (GLF)	Gold	30,000^{^}
United Kingdom (BPI)	Gold	100,000^{^}
United States	—	73,000
Summaries
Worldwide	—	350,000
^{*} Sales figures based on certification alone.^{^} Shipments figures based on certification alone.
