= Kazuo Ohno =

Japanese dancer (1906–2010)

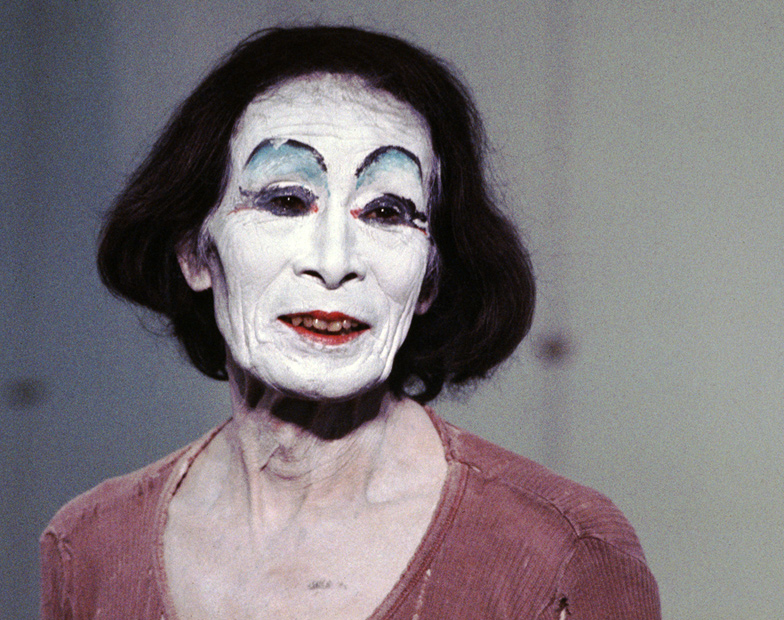
- Ohno in October 1986
- Born: October 27, 1906; Hakodate, Hokkaidō, Japan
- Died: June 1, 2010 (aged 103); Yokohama, Kanagawa, Japan
- Education: Japan Athletic College, Tokyo
- Occupation: Dancer
- Years active: 1933–2007
- Known for: Butoh dance
- Notable work: "My Mother" "Dead Sea" "Water Lilies" "Ka Cho Fu Getsu" "The Road in Heaven, The Road in Earth"
- Spouse: Chie Nakagawa (died 1997)
- Children: Yoshito Ohno
- Awards: Michelangelo Antonioni Award for the Arts (1999)
- Website: Kazuo Ohno Dance Studio

Kazuo Ohno (大野 一雄, Ōno Kazuo; October 27, 1906 – June 1, 2010) was a Japanese dancer who became a guru and inspirational figure in the dance form known as Butoh. He is the author of several books on Butoh, including The Palace Soars through the Sky, Dessin, Words of Workshop, and Food for the Soul. The latter two were published in English as Kazuo Ohno's World: From Without & Within (2004).

Ohno once said of his work: "The best thing someone can say to me is that while watching my performance they began to cry. It is not important to understand what I am doing; perhaps it is better if they don't understand, but just respond to the dance."

== Early life ==
Ohno was born in Hakodate City, Hokkaido, Japan, on October 27, 1906. He demonstrated an aptitude for athletics in junior high school and graduated from an athletic college in 1929, teaching physical education at a Christian high school. In 1933, Ohno began studying with Japanese modern dance pioneers Baku Ishii and Takaya Eguchi, which qualified him to teach dance at the Soshin Girls' School in Yokohama, from which he retired in 1980.

In 1938, Ohno was drafted into the Japanese Army as a lieutenant, and later rose to captain. He fought in China and New Guinea, where he was captured and interned by the Australians as a prisoner of war (POW). The war and its horrors provided him with inspiration for some of his later works, including Jellyfish Dance, thought to be a meditation on the burials at sea he had observed on board the ship transporting soldiers back to Japan.

== Career ==
After the war, he began work on his dance again, and presented his first solo works in 1949 in Tokyo. In the 1950s, He taught Mime Studio with Shinya Ando by Hironobu Oikawa. Yoshito Ohno was student of the studio. Later, he met Tatsumi Hijikata, who inspired him to begin cultivating Butoh, a new form of dance evolving in the turmoil of Japan's drab postwar landscape. Hijikata, who rejected the Western dance forms popular at the time, developed with Ohno and a collective group the vocabulary of movements and ideas that later, in 1961, he named the Ankoku Butoh-ha movement.

During the 1960s, Ohno sought his own style, while collaborating with Tatusmi Hijikata. In 1977, he premiered his solo La Argentina Sho, directed by Hijikata and dedicated to the famed Spanish dancer Antonia Mercé (known as "La Argentina") whom he had seen perform in 1926. He received Japan's prestigious Dance Critics' Circle Award for the performance and subsequently toured the piece, impacting the international dance world from the 14th International Festival at Nancy, Meurthe-et-Moselle in 1980, to his American debut in 1981 at La MaMa Experimental Theatre Club in New York City. Other cities on the tour included Strasbourg, London, Stuttgart, Paris and Stockholm.

With Hijikata directing, Ohno created two more major works, My Mother and Dead Sea, performed with his son, Yoshito Ohno. Other works include Water Lilies, Ka Chō Fū Getsu [Flowers-Birds-Wind-Moon] and The Road in Heaven, The Road in Earth. He was awarded a cultural award from Kanagawa Prefecture in 1993, a cultural award from Yokohama city in 1998, and the Michelangelo Antonioni Award for the Arts in 1999.

== Teaching ==
Ohno established the Kazuo Ohno Dance Studio in 1949, and built the Kamihoshikawa studio in 1961 in Hodogaya, Yokohama, for the creation and rehearsal of his choreography. Now under the aegis of son Yoshito Ohno, the Kazuo Ohno Dance Studio conducts workshops, produces performances and has established a butoh archive, collecting and classifying all materials related to butoh and Kazuo Ohno's legacy. Ohno's studio is currently open for students to attend. Classes are directed by Yoshito.

== Personal life ==
A devout Southern Baptist since his conversion as a young man, Ohno supported himself throughout much of his life as a physical education teacher at Kanto Gakuin High School, a private Christian school in Yokohama from which he retired at 86.

== In popular culture ==
Ohno starred in the films O-shi no shozo [A Portrait of Mr. O] (1969), directed by Chiaki Nagano; The Scene of the Soul (1991) by Katsumi Hirano; and the documentary Kazuo Ohno (1995), directed by Daniel Schmid. Ohno also appeared in several films by German director Peter Sempel, most notably in the music film Dandy (1988) alongside Blixa Bargeld, Nick Cave, and Lene Lovich, among others. Ohno wrote three books on Butoh, including The Palace Soars through the Sky, a collection of essays and photographs; Dessin with drawings and notes on his Butoh creations; Words of Workshop, a collection of lectures given in his workshop; and Food for the Soul, a selection of photography from the 1930s through 1999. The latter two books were combined and published in English as Kazuo Ohno's World: From Without & Within (2004, Wesleyan University Press). In October 2006, soon after Ohno's 100th birthday, Kyoto-based publisher Seigensha released a photography book in homage to Ohno, featuring the works of Eikoh Hosoe, entitled The Butterfly Dream.

== Later years and death ==
In 2001, though he lost his ability to walk, Ohno continued performing and developed ways to express himself through dance solely by moving his hands. In recent years, Ohno had been under nurse's care at home, but he continued his stage appearances, particularly in the Butoh works of his son Yoshito Ohno. In January 2007, he made his final public appearance in Yoshito's Hyakkaryoran at a gala celebrating his 100th birthday. Ohno died of respiratory failure on June 1, 2010, in Yokohama, Japan, at the age of 103.
