= Yoichiro Yoshikawa =

Yoichiro Yoshikawa 吉川洋一郎
- Born: October 8, 1957; Sakaide, Kagawa Prefecture, Japan
- Died: January 16, 2026 (aged 68)
- Genres: New Age, Ambient, Soundtrack, J-POP
- Occupations: Composer, arranger, film producer
- Instrument: Keyboard
- Website: www.yoichiroyoshikawa.com

Yoichiro Yoshikawa (吉川洋一郎, Yoshikawa Yōichirō; October 8, 1957 – January 16, 2026) was a Japanese composer, music arranger and film producer. He also collaborated with singer and actress Jun Togawa.

== Background ==
Yoshikawa was born in Sakaide, Kagawa Prefecture on October 8, 1957. During his enrollment at the University of Tsukuba, he was introduced to the Butoh dance group, Sankai Juku. Over more than 35 years, Yoshikawa was an artistic director for Sankai Juku's music. Yoshikawa produced music for news programs such as the six-part documentary, The Miracle Planet (Chikyu Dai Kiko) for NHK and for animated television series. In April 2014, Yoshikawa started music production for Baby Steps on the e-Tele anime slot at NHK Educational TV.

Yoshikawa died of bile duct cancer on January 16, 2026, at the age of 68.

== Career ==
At three years of age, Yoshikawa started to learn to play the piano. He could listen to music on a hand-turned or electric gramophone imported from the United States by his great-grandfather. Yoshikawa was educated at the Sakaide elementary and lower secondary schools which were associated with the Faculty of Education at Kagawa University. At school, Yoshikawa used a tape recorder to record his piano and guitar compositions and performances. Whilst enrolled at the University of Tsukuba, Yoshikawa met Ushio Amagatsu, who was the organizer of Sankai Juku and a former member of the Kinkan Shonen piano trio.

In 1986, Yoshikawa, Takashi Kako, and Yasukazu Sato (Yas Kaz) became the directors of Sankai Juku. Since then, the troupe's work has been performed biennially at the Théâtre de la Ville, Paris, France. In 2002, Hibiki, Resonance from Far Away won an Olivier award for best new dance production and in 2006, Toki, a Moment in the Weave of Time won the grand prize at the sixth Asahi performing arts awards. In 2013, Sankai Juku won a Japan Foundation award.

Yoshikawa's signature work is the music for the 1987 NHK documentary series, The Miracle Planet. The program's main theme won an international prize at the 1992 JASRAC awards. The program won the 29th Director General of Science and Technology Agency award. Yoshikawa's music has been released on albums including Music for the Miracle Planet, A Dream of Akuaku, Kyplos and Taiyo no Matsuge (Lashes of the Sun).

Between 1984 and 1993, Yoshikawa was director of keyboards and music arrangements for the rock group, Yapoos, led by Jun Togawa and was associated with the production of their album, Yapoos Keikaku. Yoshikawa's song, Raja Maharaja, performed by Jun Togawa, was a hit on Minna no Uta.

Yoshikawa produced ambient music for amusement parks including the Tokyo Sea Life Park (1989) and music for television programs such as News 11 and News 9 (between 1995 and 1999), News 10 (2001), Hello Japan (Ogenki Desuka Nippon Retto) (between 2003 and 2009) for NHK, and Together with Mew and Eep (Nyan Chu to Issho) (between 2003 and 2006) for NHK Educational TV. He also produced sound tracks for animations such as Oz created by Natsumi Itsuki and music for the Anime cartoon, Kyo Kara Maoh! (2004). Yoshikawa collaborated with artists such as Princess Princess, Agnes Chan, Yuki Saito and Sophie Marceau.

In 2005, Yoshika produced the DVD for the Steinberg TEK laboratory, Japan, Cubase music production software. Since 2010, Yoshikawa has been associated with marketing for the University of Tsukuba, including the song Imagine the Future. In 2012, Yoshikawa was a key note speaker at the 100th anniversary of foundation of the Sakaide Elementary School.

== Selected works ==
=== Theatrical works ===
Sankai Juku

- Unetsu, the Egg Stands out of Curiosity (1986), Theatre de la veille, Paris.
- Shijima, the Darkness Calms Down in Space (1988), Theatre de la veille, Paris.
- Omote, the Grazed Surface (1991), Theatre de la veille, Paris.
- Yuragi, in a Space of Perpetual Motion (1993), Theatre de la veille, Paris.
- Hiyomeki, Within a Gentle Vibration and Agitation (1995), Theatre de la veille, Paris.
- Hibiki, Resonance from Far Away (1998), Theatre de la veille, Paris.
- Kagemi, Beyond the Metaphors of Mirrors (2000), Theatre de la veille, Paris.
- Utsuri, Virtual Garden (2003), Theatre de la veille, Paris.
- Toki, a Moment in the Weave Time (2005), Theatre de la veille, Paris.
- Kinkan Shonen (1978), Nihon Shobo Hall, Japan. (Re-created in 2005 at the Biwako Hall Centre, Shiga.)
- Shantala Shivalingappa (2007), Theatre des Abbesses, Paris.
- Tobari, as if in an Inexhaustible Flux (2008), Theatre de la veille, Paris.
- Utsushi (2008), a collage of previous works.
- Kara mi, Two Flows (2010), Theatre de la veille, Paris.
- Une Histoire D'ame with Sophie Marceau (2011), Theatre de Rond Point, Paris.
- Umusuna, Memories before History (2012), Opera de Lyon.

=== Film soundtrack ===
- Robinson's Garden (1987)

- Berlin International film Festival, Reader Jury of the "Zitty" (1987), Locarno International Film Festival, Special Mention (1987)

=== Music for NHK television ===
- Weekend seminar (1985)
- Everyone's Songs (1985), opening theme for Minna no Uta
- Raja Maharaja (1985) performed by Jun Togawa for Minna no Uta
- Poketto no Nakade (1986) performed by Yuki Saito for Minna no Uta
- Shinpu san no Paipu Orugan (1986) performed by Agnes Chan for Minna no Uta
- Miracle Planet (1987)
- News 11 (1995) for News Watch 9
- High-Vision (1995), album.
- News 10 (2001)
- Nyan Chu to Issho (2003), Together with Mew and Eep
- Ogenki Desuka Nippon Retto (2003), Hello Japan
- Kyo Kara Maoh! (2004), Today's Demon King anime.
- Baby Steps (2014), e-television anime.

=== Discography ===
==== 1980s ====
- Ura Tamahime (1985) Jun Togawa and the Yapoos (Alfa Records)
- Suki Suki Daisuki (1985) Jun Togawa (Alfa)
- Kyokuto Ian Shoka (1986) Jun Togawa and Unit (Alfa)
- Unetsu, the Egg Stands out of Curiosity (1986) Sankai Juku (Wave)
- Roninson's Garden (1987) sound track (EMI records)
- Miracle Planet (1988) sound track (EMI)
- Yapoos Keikaku (1988) Yapoos (Teichiku)
- A Dream of Akuaku (1988) Yoichiro Yoshikawa (EMI)
- Kyplos (1988) Yoichiro Yoshikawa (EMI)
- Shijima, the Darkness Calms down in Space (1988) Sankai Juku (Wave)
- Daitenshi No Yoni (1988) Yapoos (Teichiku)
- Music for The Miracle Planet (1989) Yoichiro Yoshikawa (EMI)

==== 1990s ====
- Taiyo No Matsuge (1990) Yoichiro Yoshikawa (EMI)
- Omote, the Grazed Surface (1991) Sankai Juku (Wave)
- Daiyaru Y wo Mawase (1991) Yapoos (EMI)
- Oz (1992) (Victor)
- Yuragi, in a Space of Perpetual Motion (1993) Sankai Juku (Wave)
- I.R.I.A., Zeiram, the Animation (1994) Ova.
- "Hiyomeki, Within a Gentle Vibration and Agitation" (1995) Sankai Juku (Wave)
- "Green Legend Ran" (1995) Ova, (Pioneer LDC)
- Bastard (1996) sound track (Victor)
- Hibiki, Resonance from Far Away (1998) Sankai Juku (Wave)
- Umino Onritsu (1989) music for Tokyo Sea Life Park.

==== 2000s ====
- Kagemi, Beyond the Metaphors of Mirrors (2000) Sankai Juku (IO-factory)
- Utsuri, Virtual Garden (2003) Sankai Juku (IO-factory)
- Toki, a Moment in the Weave of Time (2005) Sankai Juku (IO-factory)
- Unetsu (2006) Sankai Juku DVD (IO-factory)
- Kinkan Shonen (2005) Sankai Juku (IO-factory)
- Tobari, as if in an Inexhaustible Flux (2008) Sankai Juku (IO-factory)
- Kyo kara Mao! (2009) original sound track (BMG)

==== 2010s ====
- Kara mi, two flows (2010) Sankai Juku (IO-factory)
- Umusuna, Memories before History (2012) Sankai Juku (IO-factory)
- Dreaming and Music Concert ~ Anpanman Hit Songs with Orchestra~ CD (2013) (VAP)
- Baby Steps (2014) original sound track (IO-factory)

=== Amusement parks and concerts ===
- Tokyo Sea Life Park (1989)
- Seto Ohashi Expo, Shikoku Museum (1988)
- Saitama Expo Theme Pavilion (1988)
- Asia Pacific Ocean Expo, Saison Museum (1989)
- Panasonic Information and Communication Systems, TDC Bird Hi-Vision Theater (1992)
- 48th National Sports Festival, music director (1992)
- Inter-Highschool championships, music director (1998)
- Yoichiro Yoshikawa Concert, Kagawa Prefectural Hall (2000)

== Bibliography ==
- Opinel and Peacock Day Gentosha Literary Publications, a youth graffiti describing with a witty touch how the Sankai Juku World Tour started.
