= Anzu Furukawa =

Japanese actor and music educator

- Born: Anzu Furukawa; 28 February 1952; Tokyo, Japan
- Died: October 23, 2001 (aged 49); Berlin, Brandenburg, Germany
- Occupations: Dancer; actor; performer

Anzu Furukawa(古川あんず, February 28 , 1952 – October 23 , 2001) was a butoh dancer and performance artist. Since 1973 she has worked as a choreographer, performer and dancer in various groups in Japan including Dairakudakan and Europe.

== Life and work ==
Anzu Furukawa began her dance career at the age of ten. She studied classical ballet with Umeko Inoue at the Tokyo Ballet School between 1962 and 1970 and modern dance with Zenkō Hino between 1969 and 1970 . At the end of the 1960s, the spirit of optimism in the student movement also reached high school and high school students in Tokyo.

The peace movement, anti-American protests and a burgeoning rebellion against the restrictive establishment united young people in the Japanese metropolises. In the late 1960s, Furukawa was forcibly expelled from Tokyo Metropolitan Tachikawa High School along with a group of other classmates for their participation in student riots. However, she managed a short time later to get a place at the Music Conservatory of Toho Gakuen School of Music. From 1972 to 1975 she studied composition and piano under Irino Yoshirō and increasingly turned to avant-garde art and performance-scene too.

The second developmental movement of Japanese butoh, seamlessly following the works of founding fathers Tatsumi Hijikata and Kazuo Ono, took place amidst the social upheavals of 1970s Japan, in an atmosphere marked by student riots, street fighting and barricades, performance acts and agitprop . In 1974, Furukawa joined the legendary butoh company Dairakudakan under Akaji Maro and stayed there until 1979, together with Tetsuro Tamura founded the avant-garde DanceLoveMachine (1979–86) ensemble. She was considered to be artistically versatile and was well-versed in both classical and modern dance. Her dance work included collaborations with Carlotta Ikeda, Murobishi Ko and Sankai Juku.

=== Second creative period and move to Europe ===
In 1986 she visited with the DanceLoveMachine Ensemble at the invitation of the Künstlerhaus Bethanien Berlin and started a European tour from there. The dance company Dance Butter Tokyo, founded in Tokyo, the majority of whose members were recruited from their dance school DANCE ANZU SCHOOL, got a German branch Dance Butter Freiburg in Freiburg. In 1995 she appeared in Hisaya Iwasa's author's film "Petite Hanako: the actress who captured Rodin's heart" in the role of the dancer Ōta Hanako, the film celebrated in the same year at the film festival in Montreux ( International Electronic Cinema Festival, Tokyo/Montreux) premiered and won the Best Documentary Award.

She died in 2001 at the age of 49 from complications from cancer.

Every time I dance in the street, I look up at the sky. Even if there is no breeze on earth, the wind stirs in the high heavens. Suddenly I'm swinging on the wind and looking down from above at my other self on the ground below, which is gazing at the sky. My ego on earth is now just a point. Already the shadows of the people are fading and now the city is no bigger than a coffee cup... I keep floating away until I finally end up in a quiet bar on another planet.

== Choreographies (selection) ==
Her life's work includes more than 50 dance and stage works, many of which were created in the 1980s and realized in Europe, including works such as Anzu's Animal Atlas, Cells of Apple, Faust II, Rent-a-body and also:

- 1981 Frankenstein's Octopus
- 1981 Le Con de la Renard
- 1984 Sheer Mood
- 1985 Manhattan Butoh Bourbaki Project
- 1985 The Potlach of Music
- 1985 Anzuology: The Dog, The Elephant, The Bird, The Crocodile Time
- 1987-94 The Insect
- 1989 The Detective from China
- 1989-91 Tonight on the Moon
- 1990 Carmen
- 1991 The Diamond as big as the Ritz
- 1993 Transfiguration Office
- 1994/95 The Stick
- 1996 The Aftermath
- 1996 Afastem-se vacas que a vida é curta (Lume Teatro – Brazil)
- 1997 Jazz Japan
- 1997-98 L'arrache-coeur
- 1999 Goya - La quinta del sordo

== Awards ==
She received grants and prizes, e.g. from the Goethe Institute Tokyo, The Japan Foundation, Japan Arts Council (日本芸術文化振興会), the Alfred Kordelin Foundation, The Art Council of province of Central Finland (Keski-Suomen taidetoimikunta), the Astro-Labium Prize, The International Electronic Cinema Festival in Montreux and the Cologne Theater Prize.

== Teaching ==
In 1991 she accepted the call to Braunschweig University of Art, where she took on a professorship for performance and performing arts in the performing arts department (now the Institute for Performing Arts and Education). She taught dance there until 1996, directed happenings and created choreographies, e.g. with their performance project Verwandlungsamt. From the mid-1990s she worked on productions in Scandinavia, especially in Finland. She was considered a driving force in the development of the Finnish butoh scene and her work influenced generations of dancers. As a guest lecturer she taught at several Finnish universities and created joint productions at Finnish National Theatre, she has directed works such as the Rite of Spring (1994) and Bo and Shiroi mizu (1995) with mostly Finnish ensemble members. Her best-known students include Minako Seki, Yuko Kaseki, Takako Suzuki, Yuko Negoro, Kim Itoh.

== Filmography ==
- Furukawa, Anzu: Four Dances at the West Berlin Academy of Arts, VHS video, 36 minutes. (Idea by Anzu Furukawa, realization by Regina Ulwer and Ingrid Wewerka), Berlin, 1986 Alexander Verlag . ISBN 978-3-923854-70-7
- 1995 Petite Hanako: the actress who captured Rodin's heart (プチト・アナコ ロダンが愛した旅芸人花子) Director: Hisaya Iwasa Choreography: Rie Fujima
