= Natsu =

Natsu may refer to:

== People ==
- Natsu Ando (安藤 なつ; born 1981), Japanese comedian
- Natsu Hyūga (日向 夏; born 1981), Japanese novelist
- Natsu Nakajima (中嶋 夏; born 1943), Japanese dancer
- Natsu Saito (齋藤 夏; born 2000), Japanese badminton player
- Natsu Sakaguchi (坂口 夏月; born 1995), Japanese racing driver
- Sumire Natsu (夏 すみれ; born 1981), Japanese professional wrestler

== Characters ==
- Natsu Dragneel, the main character in the Fairy Tail anime and manga series
- Natsu Ayuhara, a character in the Rival Schools video game series
- Natsu (Soulcalibur), a character in the Soul video game series
- Natsu Hinata, a minor character in the Haikyuu anime and manga series
- Natsu Yutori, a character in the Blue Archive video game series
