= Edoheart =

Nigerian artist

Eseohe Arhebamen
- Born: Obehioye Eseohe Ikhianose Oghomwenyenmwen Cleopatra Anne Arhebamen; Zaria, Nigeria
- Other names: Edoheart; Eseohe Arhebamen-Yamasaki
- Occupations: Poet, dancer, singer, musician, producer, performance artist, visual artist
- Years active: 2000–present
- Known for: Founder of Edoheart; pioneer of Butoh-Vocal Theatre; experimental poetry and performance art
- Notable work: Seeding the Clouds (2003); Fire Butoh series (2007-2011)
- Style: Butoh-Vocal Theatre; experimental performance; spoken word poetry
- Movement: Experimental performance art, Butoh dance, spoken word
- Spouse: Seth Yamasaki (m. 2006)

Eseohe Arhebamen or Eseohe Arhebamen-Yamasaki, also known as Edoheart (born Obehioye Eseohe Ikhianose Oghomwenyenmwen Cleopatra Anne Arhebamen), is a poet, dancer, singer, musician, producer, performance artist and visual artist. Eseohe was born in Zaria, Nigeria and is descended from a royal family of the Benin Empire. Eseohe Arhebamen's maternal grandmother is Princess Theresa Maria Nodumwenben Osazuwa, a princess of the Edo people. Eseohe Arhebamen's great-grandfather Osazuwa Eredia, the father of Princess Theresa Osazuwa, was the Oba N’Ugu and Enogie of Umoghumwun, making Eseohe Arhebamen a royal descendant and princess. "The foundation of the kingdom of Ugu, with its capital at Umoghumwun has been traced to Prince Idu, the eldest son of Oba Eweka I."

== Early life ==
Eseohe Arhebamen is the oldest of five siblings and frequently played a parental role in their upbringing. At the age of seven Eseohe's family migrated to the United States and settled in Detroit, Michigan. At age 17 she enrolled in the University of Michigan at the Residential College. Although strongly encouraged to pursue medicine as a career path, Eseohe instead followed her passion for poetry, language and the arts. As an undergraduate student Eseohe focused on literary means and performance as a way to affect social change. While at the University of Michigan, Eseohe won prestigious awards for her writing and is included in a University of Michigan Anthology of Hopwood Award winners.

== Career ==
At 19 years old, Eseohe earned a position as Writer-in-Residence with InsideOut Literary Arts in Detroit, Michigan and worked with children in impoverished inner-city schools to expand their literary skills. After moving to New York in 2003, Eseohe founded the company EdoHeart also written as Edoheart which became her performance name. Eseohe Arhebamen is synonymous with Edoheart.

Eseohe received a Bachelor of Arts from the University of Michigan in Creative Writing and Literature in August, 2005, and went on to receive another Bachelor of Arts in Studio Art with a minor in English from Hunter College. She further graduated from New York University with a Master's degree in Performance Studies, which is described as drawing from a study of the performing arts, anthropology and sociology, literary theory, and legal studies. Eseohe also intensively studied Butoh dance with Yukio Waguri.

Areas of interest in Eseohe Arhebamen's experimental work are imaginative creation of alternate environments, and poetry and vocal expressions as a source for movement. She has choreographed and taught or led workshops involving these areas of interest at The Living Theatre and Columbia University's Teacher's College. Eseohe Arhebamen has appeared on Korean and American television and news, and in American, Estonian and Latvian newspapers. In 2011, she was chosen by artist Kalup Linzy to appear in a documentary about New York artists. Eseohe Arhebamen also appears in a video tape included in acclaimed poet Anne Waldman's papers purchased by the University of Michigan Special Collections Library.

== Butoh vocal theatre ==
Eseohe Arhebamen is the first indigenous and native-born African butoh performer. In addition, Eseohe Arhebamen is the first performer to combine butoh dance with singing, talking, mudra, sign language, spoken word, and experimental vocalizations after the traditional dance styles of the Edo people of West Africa. She refers to this dance style as Butoh-Vocal Theatre. Eseohe Arhebamen's Butoh-Vocal Theatre style arises out of her work in poetry, music and the traditional Edo theater in which performers dance and sing simultaneously, and is influenced by her expressed belief in a common lingual history between the Edo people of Nigeria and the Japanese. On 26 September 2010 Eseohe gave a performance at a Yukio Waguri intensive workshop demonstrating her style of Butoh-Vocal Theatre during which she danced butoh while singing Pure Imagination from Willy Wonka & the Chocolate Factory.

Eseohe's notable performance during the Fifth Diverse Universe tour was described by Kaarel Kressa as embodying natural elegance and femininity; with poetry, dance and song that won the hearts of the audience. Eseohe's performances have also been called "powerful ritual".

== Personal life ==
In 2006, Eseohe married Seth Yamasaki, son of Pulitzer Prize winning photographer Taro Yamasaki, and grandson of Minoru Yamasaki, Japanese-American architect best known for designing the World Trade Center. They have one daughter.
