= Barbara Bourget =

Canadian artistic director

Barabara Bourget
- Born: 1950 (age 74–75); Port Alberni, British Columbia, Canada
- Education: Royal Winnipeg Ballet School
- Occupation(s): Dancer, choreographer
- Partner: Jay Hirabayashi
- Children: Joseph Hirabayashi, Dan Haggart
- Career
- Current group: Kokoro Dance
- Former groups: Les Grands Ballets Canadiens, Mountain Dance Theatre, Experimental Dance and Music (EDAM)

Barbara Bourget is a dancer, choreographer and the artistic director of Kokoro Dance Theatre Society in Vancouver, British Columbia. She is known for her butoh performances and choreography. Her work has been described as difficult, punishing and uncompromising. She was born in Port Alberni, British Columbia in 1950.

== Education and early career ==
Bourget began tap dancing at age four and went on to take ballet class at age nine. From 1961 to 1967 she studied with Mara McBirney and from 1967 to 1969 Bourget was a scholarship student at the Royal Winnipeg Ballet School. Her teachers at the Royal Winnipeg School included Arnold Spohr, Gwynne Ashton, Jean McKenzie and Maria Fay. She danced with Les Grands Ballets Canadiens from 1969 to 1972 and then began working in modern dance.

== Career ==
Bourget performed from 1974 to 1978 in Mauryne Allan's Mountain Dance Theatre in Vancouver. In 1975, encouraged by Allan she choreographed "Trio for Three Women". She met Jay Hirabayashi in 1979 when both were dancing with Paula Ross's company and they married in 1981.

In 1982 Bourget and Hirabayashi with Peter Bingham, Ahmed Hassan, Lola MacLaughlin, Jennifer Mascall, and Peter Ryan, co-founded Experimental Dance and Music (EDAM). They left EDAM after four years to co-found Kokoro Dance. In 1987 she performed Rage, choreographed by her husband Jay Hirabayashi. Since forming Kokoro Dance, Barbara has choreographed over one hundred dances. These include Dis/Zero (1987), Episode in Blue: A Cantata from Hell (1988), Zero to the Power (1989), Crime Against Grace (2001), and Sunyata.

In 1998 Kokoro Dance began producing the Vancouver International Dance Festival. Initially as a platform for butoh performance, the festival expanded across genres over time.

Bourget's 2012 work A Simple Life was created as an exploration of her decades-long career in dance. The piano score accompanying the work was composed her son Joe Hirabayashi.

== Awards ==
- 2009 Isadora Award for Teaching
- 2011 Vancouver Mayor's Arts Award in Dance

== Sources ==
- Pepper, Kaija. (2000) Barbara Bourget. Encyclopedia of Theatre Dance in Canada. 91–93.
