= Tadashi Endo =

Japanese dancer (1947–2025)

Tadashi Endo (1947 – 25 May 2025) was a Japanese butoh dancer resident in Göttingen, Germany. Endo was a Japanese national. He studied theatre direction in Vienna before touring Europe giving solo performances accompanied by leading jazz performers. In 1980, he was hired as head of a theater program for the city of Northeim, where he worked until 1986. In 1992, he founded the MAMU butoh center in the nearby university city of Göttingen. The center holds performances as well as training students of the dance form and holding an annual festival in the Goettingen Junges Theater. Endo also toured internationally. In 2009, he choreographed Georg Friedrich Händel's opera Admeto, directed by Doris Dörrie and performed at the Edinburgh International Festival.

Endo was greatly influenced by Kazuo Ohno, whom he met in 1989. Endo's style is harsh and stark, sometimes accompanied by live or recorded jazz, a dance form that Endo sees as having a natural affinity with butoh.

Endo died on 25 May 2025.

== Literature ==
- Gabriele Endo, Shuichi Sato and Tsuyoshi Takahashi (editors): Tadashi Endo's Dance - the Photobook. ISBN 978-3-00-025428-4. 2009.
- Maciej Rusinek "Tadashi Endo BUTOH-MA Das Königreich der KörperPoesie" Photobook/Text 2019

ISBN 978-3-00-062698-2

- Maciej Rusinek - Fotografien "BUTOH II - Das Königreich der KörperPoesie" - Photobook/Text 2021

ISBN 978-3-00-068234-6
