= Maureen Fleming =

Japanese-born American dancer

Maureen Fleming is an American dancer, performance artist, and choreographer from New York City. She studied butoh dance in Japan, and was described by The New Yorker magazine as "perhaps the foremost American practitioner of Butoh."

== Early life ==
Fleming was born in Japan and grew up in Yokohama, the daughter of parents in the United States Navy. She was injured in an automobile accident at the age of two, losing the disc between her fourth and fifth vertebrae, which she only learned of many years later. She moved with her parents to the United States when she was three years old, and began dancing at approximately age seven.

== Dance career ==
Fleming studied ballet with Cecchetti method master Margaret Craske (1892–1990), and performed briefly with several New York City-based dance companies. She was first exposed to butoh in 1984 when she met butoh dancer Min Tanaka in New York City, joining his company, Maijuku, for a time. Following this, she studied butoh in Japan with Tanaka, and later with Kazuo Ohno, one of the founders of the art form.

Fleming has performed in North America, South America, Europe, Africa and Asia, and collaborated in her multimedia works with playwright David Henry Hwang, composer Philip Glass, photographer Lois Greenfield, ikebana artist Gaho Taniguchi and artist Christopher Odo. She has toured with Min Tanaka and pianists Peter Phillips and Bruce Brubaker. She has also performed with the dancer Jean Erdman.

She directs the Maureen Fleming Company, an interdisciplinary performance ensemble. Maureen Fleming began creating photography installations in conjunction with her live performances in NYC in 2009. She is known for her original form of visual theater. Fleming has also taught at the Juilliard School and the New York University Tisch School of the Arts.

In 2022 she had a four-week residency on the Irish island of Inisheer (Inis Oirr), with support from the Guggenheim Foundation, which "allowed her to create a bridge with her own ancestors and her cultural heritage".

== Art ==
Fleming has stated that she attempts to create archetypes in her dances, and described the female nude as a universal artistic image. She has stated that it often takes her ten years to create a new dance.

== Awards ==
- National Endowment for the Arts (1993-1995, 2001, 2004, 2013, 2015), New England,
- Foundation for the Arts National Dance Project (1997-1999),
- Rockefeller MAP Fund (1997, 1998),
- New York Foundation for the Arts (1990, 1997) National Performance Network: Performing Americas Project (2003, 2012),
- Meet the Composer Choreographer Project (1992),
- the Asian Cultural Council (1990, 2004, 2006),
- NEA Japan US Friendship Commission (2001),
- Japan Foundation Performing,
- Arts Japan (2002, 2004, 2007).
- Arts International (1993-2003),
- USArtists International 2009, 2016.

Maureen Fleming was a Fulbright Scholar in Ireland 2016 - 2017 at the Irish World Academy at the University of Limerick and the National University of Ireland in Galway.
