= Kokoro Dance =

Kokoro Dance (also known as Kokoro Dance Theatre Society) is one of Canada's leading butoh dance troupes. Based in Vancouver, British Columbia, it was founded in 1986 by artistic directors Barbara Bourget and Japanese Canadian Jay Hirabayashi. They have performed across Canada, in the United States, and abroad.

As is characteristic of butoh dance, they often perform naked, shaved heads, and covered in white body make-up. The company runs programming for young audiences, as well as adults. They perform an annual dance at Vancouver's clothing-optional Wreck Beach.

Some of their numerous works include:

- Dis/Zero (1987)
- Episode in Blue: A Cantata from Hell (1988)
- Zero to the Power (1989)
- Crime Against Grace (2001)
- Sheepman Dreams (2003)
- Tutaj Tam/Here to There (2005)
- Sunyata (1991, 1997, 2006)
