= Sayoko Onishi =

Sayoko Onishi (born April 24, 1968) is a butoh dancer, choreographer and master from Japan, known for the development of the new butoh style, and the founding of the International Butoh Academy in Palermo, Italy.

== Life ==
Sayoko Onishi was born in Sapporo, Hokkaido on April 24, 1968.

In 1986, she started studying butoh dance in the dance company Hoppo-Butoh Ha, with Ipei Yamada. Later she began an intensive artistic activity under the supervision of Hironobu Oikawa, absorbing the choreographic style of butoh dance.

Since 1990, she has lived in Europe working as a professional choreographer and a dancer, teaching and performing all over the world. Her choreographic projects have been funded by the Deutsche Oper in Berlin, the Amsterdams Fonds voor de kunst, the University of Palermo, the Teatro Comunale di Ferrara.

She has been a guest teacher of butoh and new butoh for the National Dance Academy, the University of Siena, and the University of Palermo.

In 2000 Sayoko Onishi established in Palermo, Italy where she founded the International Butoh Academy at the presence of master and butoh founder Yoshito Ohno. Sayoko Onishi and Yoshito Ohno are credited as being the first butoh choreographers to speak about New Butoh style. The academy name was changed to New Butoh School in 2007. In 2018 the New Butoh School established in Ruvo di Puglia, Italy.

Onishi's active in Europe in the French company Man'ok & Cie in Nancy (France) since 2009 with the project MA2 (Move Art Two).

With her new butoh style, Onishi is considered one of the most important innovators in the international butoh panorama.

=== Awards ===
- 1st prize at the International Dance Competition in Augusburg ( (Germany)) (1997)
- 1st prize at the Die Platze contemporary dance competition in Tokyo with her performance "Primavera Siciliana" (2006)

=== Filmography ===
Ju-Ni Hitoe oder die Entdeckung der Seele (Documentary, 1994)

=== Publications ===
- L'arte dell'improvvisazione, atto secondo, due interviste di Vito Minoia a Ginevra Sanguigno e a Sayoko Onishi - Proartis, ISSN 1594-3496
- Catarsi : teatri delle diversità : rivista europea, A. 2015, n. 68-69, p. 40-41, "New Butoh al profumo di zagara : Sayoko Onishi" di Eugenia Casini Ropa - ISSN 1594-3496
