= Carlotta Ikeda =

Japanese-born butoh dancer

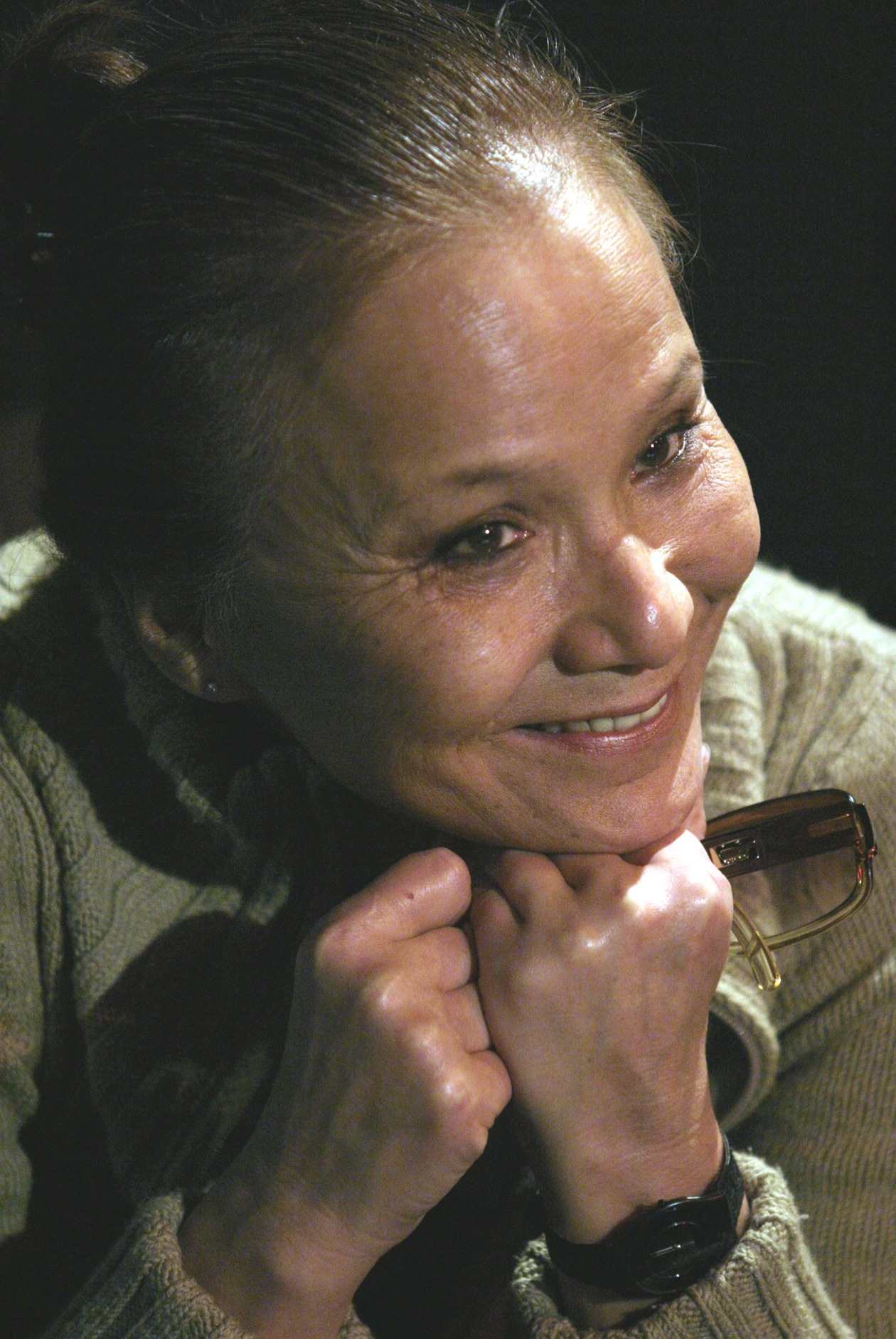
- Born: Sanae Ikeda; 19 February 1941; Fukui, Japan
- Died: 24 September 2014 (aged 73); Bordeaux, France
- Occupations: dancer, choreographer
- Years active: 1960–2014
- Dancing career
- Former groups: Dairakudakan, Ariadone
- Website: http://ariadone.fr/eng/

Carlotta Ikeda, born Sanae Ikeda (19 February 1941 – 24 September 2014), was a Japanese-born butoh dancer. She chose her artist name, Carlotta, after Carlotta Grisi.

== Biography ==
Carlotta Ikeda, who had studied modern dance in the tradition of Martha Graham and Mary Wigman from 1960 to 1964, began to collaborate in the early 1970s with the Japanese butoh group Dairakudakan. In 1974, she founded with Kô Murobushi the Ariadone Company, an all-female butoh dance troupe. In the 1980s, she settled in France, first in Paris and later in Bordeaux. In Europe she became well known after she performed solo Utt.

== Choreographies (selection) ==
- 1975: Mesu Kasan (re-performed in 2005)
- 1980: Zarathoustra - at Sogetsu Hall in Tokyo
- 1981: Utt - at Sogetsu Hall in Tokyo
- 1993: Aï-Amour - at Danse Hus in Stockholm, Sweden
- 1996: Waiting after a text by Marguerite Duras - at Théâtre national de la danse et de l'image
- 1999: Haru no saïten - Un sacre du printemps - at Théâtre de la Bastille in Paris
- 2002: Togue - at Vieille Charité, Marseille
- 2005: Zarathoustra-Variations - at Centre culturel des Carmes, Langon
- 2008: Uchuu Cabaret - création Les Hivernales - CDC d'Avignon
- 2010: Chez Ikkyû - création Le Cuvier - CDC d'Aquitaine
- 2011: Medea - at Théâtre Paris-Villette
- 2012: Un coup de don - at Festival Automne en Normandie

== Bibliography ==
- Carlotta Ikeda: Danse Butô et au-delà pby Laurencine Lot, Jean-Marc Adolphe, éditions Favre Sa, 2005, ISBN 978-2828908645.
