= Bob DeNatale =

American film director

- Occupations: Filmmaker, film editor

Bob DeNatale, also credited as Robert DeNatale, is a filmmaker, film editor, professional butoh dancer, and former Marvel editor/writer.

Bob DeNatale first entered the creative scene as an editor and writer for Marvel Comics. Starting in 1983 and continuing through 1991, DeNatale edited The Amazing Spider-Man, The Spectacular Spider-Man, and Marvel Team-Up.

Although editing Spider-Man was his primary focus, during his time at Marvel, DeNatale also wrote for Dazzler, and edited Marvel Super Special #34, an adaptation of the Sheena, Queen of the Jungle film. Following his departure from Marvel Comics, DeNatale focused on his career in butoh, the avant-garde Japanese dance art.

In 1992, DeNatale founded the Flesh & Blood Mystery Theater to spread the art of butoh. Performing throughout the United States, Flesh & Blood Mystery Theater was a regular participant in the San Francisco Butoh Festival of which DeNatale was an Associate Producer. DeNatale's other butoh credits include performing in the film Oakland Underground (2006) and touring Germany and Poland with Ex…it! ’99 International Dance Festival.

During the late 1990s, DeNatale co-founded the performance group XSX with former members of the bands Vivisection and Her Majesty the Baby. He later served as the lead singer for the punk art band Kill The Messenger from 1986 to 1989. In the 2000s, DeNatale's creativity embarked on a new path as he began working in film.

His first film, a short entitled Prospect Park, Cleaning (2009), featured three butoh dancers improvising on a sunny day in Prospect Park, Brooklyn. His second short, Tales of Creation (2011), which questioned whether hearing voices was God, the Devil, or insanity, was an Official Selection of the 2011 New Filmmakers New York Festival. DeNatale's third project, The Art of Dreaming (2013), was a Semi-Finalist of the 2013 Moondance International Film Festival. DeNatale is currently working on his first feature film, Kim.
