= GooSayTen =

Japanese Butoh dance group

GooSayTen is a Japanese Butoh Dance Group. Based in Sapporo, Japan, it began its activities in 1996, and has performed both in and outside Japan in roughly 20 cities across U.S.A., Canada, Germany, Poland, Spain, and other countries.

Most of their performance are done by the duo Itto Morita and Mika Takeuchi. Itto started Butoh dance in 1988 after participating in a Butoh workshop held by Semimaru, a Sankaijuku member. GooSayTen has a rigorous dance style with delicately controlled movements, but some of their Butoh pieces were full of strong movements as seen in their video clips. Itto Morita, as professor of psychology, has published several Butoh related papers in English (available at their website). Mika Takeuchi started her Butoh dance studio in 2000, and is a certified dance therapist of Japan Dance Therapy Association. They have held relaxation and dance therapy programs at mental clinics, and aim to portray insanity from both a Butoh point of view as performers and a psychotherapeutic point of view.

They give intensive Butoh workshops in Sapporo, together with private or small group lessons throughout year, and have accepted Butoh students who stayed for a couple of weeks to six months from various countries of the world.
