= Tri sestry (opera) =

- Opera by Péter Eötvös
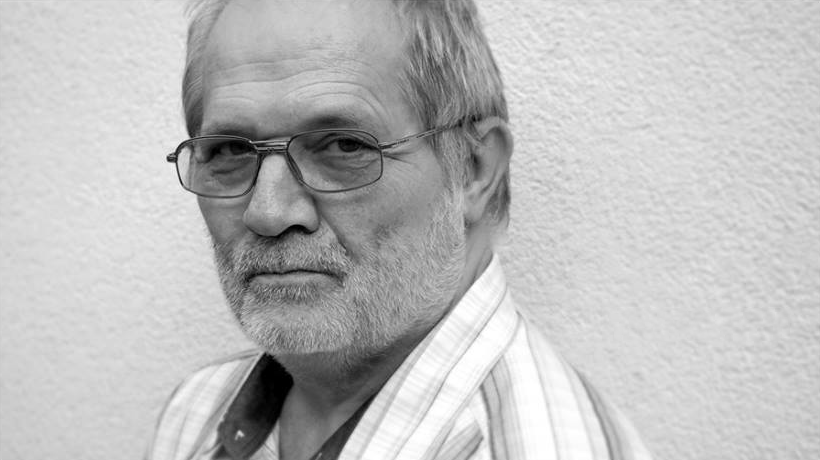
- The composer, photo by Gáspár Stekovics, 2018
- Translation: Three Sisters
- Librettist: Péter Eötvös; Claus H. Henneberg
- Language: Russian
- Based on: Chekhov's Three Sisters
- Premiere: 1998; Opéra National de Lyon

Tri sestry (Three Sisters) is a 1998 opera by Péter Eötvös to a Russian libretto by Eötvös and Claus H. Henneberg based on Anton Chekhov's play Three Sisters. It was the composer's first large-scale opera. The premiere at the Opéra National de Lyon, directed by Ushio Amagatsu, was conducted by Kent Nagano, who had commissioned the work. The production was then also shown in Paris, Brussels, and at the Wiener Festwochen festival in 2002. It became an opera played at several European opera houses including the Vienna State Opera in 2016 and the Oper Frankfurt and Teatro Colón in 2018.

== History ==
Péter Eötvös was commissioned by Kent Nagano to write an opera for the Opéra National de Lyon. It was to become his first large-scale opera. The composer chose Chekhov's 1901 Russian play Three Sisters as the basis. Together with Claus H. Henneberg, he wrote the libretto in German. It was then re-translated to Russian by Krzysztof Wiernicki. The librettists took episodes from the play and arranged them in so-called sequences, each devoted to one character: the youngest sister Irina, the brother Andrei, and the second sister Masha, while the oldest sister Olga and Andrei's wife Natasha are other major roles. The composer wrote the major female characters with the voice of a counter-tenor in mind. The main figures are characterized by solo instruments: flute for Olga, oboe and also English horn for Irina, clarinet for Masha, bass clarinet for Kulygin, bassoon for Andrei, soprano saxophone for Natasha, French horn for Tuzenbach, flugelhorn and also trumpet for Vershinin, trombone for the doctor, percussion for Solyony, viola for the three sisters, and double bass for Anfisa.

The premiere at the Opéra National de Lyon on 13 March 1998 was directed by Ushio Amagatsu. The conductor was Nagano, while the second conductor of the orchestra was the composer. The staging was inspired by Kabuki theatre. The singers of the premiere were Oleg Riabets (Irina), Vyacheslav Kagan-Paley (Masha), Alain Aubin (Olga), Albert Schagidullin (Andrei), Gary Boyce (Natasha), Nikita Storojev (Kulygin), Jan Alofs (Anfisa), Dietrich Henschel (Tuzenbach), Denis Sedov (Solyony), Wojciech Drabowicz (Vershinin), Peter Hall (Chebutykin), Ivan Matiakh (Rodé) and Marc Duguay (Fedotik). The performance was recorded and issued on CD. The production was called the most important new work of the year 1998 ("zum wichtigsten neuen Werk des Jahres 1998") by German opera critics.

Amagatsu's staging of Tri sestry was restaged in the 2001–2002 season at the Théâtre du Châtelet in Paris, Théâtre Royal de la Monnaie in Brussels, Opéra National de Lyon, and the Wiener Festwochen in Austria in 2002. It became an opera played at several European opera houses including the Vienna State Opera in 2016 and the Oper Frankfurt, where it opened the 2018/19 season. It was conducted in Frankfurt by Dennis Russell Davies and Nikolai Petersen.

== Premiere cast ==
The singers of major parts in the premiere performance were:

- Alain Aubin (countertenor travesti) – Olga
- Vyatcheslav Kagan-Paley (countertenor travesti) – Masha
- Oleg Riabets (countertenor travesti) – Irina
- Gary Boyce (countertenor travesti) – Natasha
- Albert Shagdullin (baritone) – Andrei
- Nikita Storojev (bass) – Kulygin
- Jan Alofs (bass) – Anfisa
- Orchestre de l'Opéra de Lyon, conductor Kent Nagano
