= Akira Kasai (dancer) =

Japanese butoh dancer and choreographer

- Born: 1943 (age 82–83)
- Occupations: dancer, choreographer, teacher
- Dancing career
- Dances: butoh
- Website: www.akirakasai.com

Akira Kasai (1943) is a Japanese butoh dancer and choreographer, who despite being significantly younger than mentors Kazuo Ohno and Tatsumi Hijikata, is considered to be pioneers of the art form along with them. Kasai trained in other forms of dance, but turned to butoh in the 1960s when he met and began to work with these two men. He started his own studio in 1971 but closed it in 1979 to move and study Eurythmy in Germany. He did not dance professionally at the time and for years after his return to Japan in 1986 he stayed off the stage stating that he felt too disconnected from Japanese society to perform. He returned to professional dance in 1994, with the work Saraphita and revived his studio Tenshi kan, now influenced by Eurythmy and other dance principles. He has since performed, choreographed and taught in Asia, the Americas and Europe, but his choreography is sufficiently different from most other butoh that its authenticity has been questioned.

== Life ==
Kasai was born in Japan, and grew up in the Mie Prefecture. His family was upper middle class which he says was very education conscious. His grandfather spoke good English and was an interpreter for foreign cultural figures and visitors. His father was a banker and both his parents were active Christians. He began dancing as a child, listening to his mother’s organ music at church. Later, Kasai went on to study modern dance, ballet and pantomime before discovering butoh in the early 1960s.

His butoh career began at this time but he took a hiatus in the late 1970s to move to Germany with his family. He stayed in this country from 1979 to 1985, studying at the Eurythmy School in Stuttgart and studying European culture in depth. He describes European culture as having the ability to take dualistic concepts and reunite them, something he says is missing in Japanese monistic thinking. In particular he studied he philosophy of Rudolf Steiner, which rebelled against dualistic thinking. He studied Eurythmy to answer two questions, “Is consciousness born or established by the body, or the other way around?” and “What is a life that is a life? Is life coming from a material or from somewhere else?” His goal was to deconstruct his Japanese notion of body to construct something new.

He returned to Japan permanently in 1986, but he felt lost and unable to reattach to the people and places he knew before. Without social connection, he felt he could not dance and did not do so again until he worked out a way to reconnect to his native land. From 1986 to 1994, he did not return to professional dance, but rather lectured anthroposophy of Rudolf Steiner and held workshops on Eurythmy. Between Germany and this period, Kasai had a fifteen-year lapse from public performances.

Since then, Kasai has resumed his career both in Japan and abroad. One of his sons, Mitsutke is also a dancer, combining butoh, hip hop and break dance, appearing solo and with his father both in Japan and abroad.

== Career ==
Although of a younger generation, Kasai is considered an originator of butoh, and a pioneer of the art in the 1960s and 1970s. He is acknowledged for coining the name butoh (later ankoku butoh, or dance of utter darkness) . Today is one of Japan’s butoh masters, and has been called “angel of butoh.”

His career has had him both perform, choreograph and teach butoh, modern dance, contemporary dance, and Eurythmy in the Americas, Europe and Asia, in countries such as Chile, Argentina, Mexico, Germany, France and South Korea, as well as his native Japan.

Kasai began his butoh dancing career after meeting Kazuo Ohno, performing Gi-gi under him in 1963 and then working with Tatsumi Hijikata in 1964. He worked with Hijikata until 1971, performing productions such as Bara-iro dansu (Rose colored dance) (1965) and Emotion in Metaphysics (1967). In 1971, at the age of 28, he founded his own studio called Tenshi kan in Kokubunji, just west of Tokyo. The name means "House of Angels", named after Rome’s “angel castle” Santanjiero, which had meaning for Kasai because of its history of housing both prisoners and paintings. The studio trained butoh artists Setsuko Yamada, Kota Yamazaki and others. One reason for starting Tenshikan was that he was looking for something very radical, something that could exist without a social power structure or centralized authority, separating modern dance from political or religious thought. The methodology was to not teach dance to avoid authority and allow creative freedom (although training of the body was strict), which lasted for about seven years before he shut it down to move to Germany.

Kasai did not return to professional dance until 1994, when he created the work Saraphita, which he considers to be his first socially active work. After this he began to present his own solo pieces along with choreographing for other butoh artists such as Kuniki Kisanuki, Kim Ito, Naoko Shirakawa and Ikuyo Kuroda, as well as ballet dancer Farouk Ruzimatov. At this time he also revived Tenshi-kan, using principles from Eurythmy. He continues to use these principles, but does not consider them all-encompassing, needing those from butoh as well. Where the two intersect is the notion of sound and voice being primeval.

After Saraphita, Kasai produced My own apocalypse (1994) followed by Work Exusiai (1998) .

Pollen Revolution was produced in 2001, which toured the United States in 2004, and was performed at the Festival Internacional Cervantino in 2005. In this piece, he appeared as a woman in a kabuki dress from Kyokanoko Musume Dōjōji, morphing into a hip-hop dancer.

In 2012, Kasai worked butoh artist Akaji Maro of Dairakudaban to produce Hayasasurahime. Although the two are contemporary butoh masters, they had not worked together before. The piece was first presented at the Setagaya Public Theater in Tokyo in 2012. The work is based on the ancient text, Kojiki, about the origins of the world and included butoh, modern dance and Eurythmy performances, danced to Beethoven’s Ninth Symphony. In 2013, Hayasasurahime was nominated for the Japan Dance Forum Prize. In 2014, this work was presented at the Festival Internacional Cervantino, but with all female dancers, except for the role of the goddess after which the work is named, who was portrayed by his son Mitsutake.

The Japan Society commissioned Kasai to create Butoh America, in collaboration with five emerging U.S.-based performers, a work that explores modern-day America.

Despite his success, his work has been criticized as not be butoh. In his first performance in San Francisco in 1994, a heckler shouted “This is not butoh!” to which Kasai responded from the stage “This is my flesh, this is my blood.” Similarly, at the premiere of Butoh American in 2009 at the New York Butoh Festival, several in the audience states it was more like modern dance. “Claudia la Rocco in The New York Times wrote of that evening, “This was Butoh with a big wink. Or maybe it wasn't Butoh at all.”

== Artistry ==
Kasai's work is noted for fusing Asian and Western elements, as he views butoh not as a Japanese style of dance but rather transnational and transhistorial, seeing parallels in the work of Commedia dell’Arte to the bodies of Vaslav Nijinsky, Isadora Duncan, and Tatsumi Hijikata, and sometimes more in ballet dancers than traditional butoh artists. He has been called the "Ninjinsky of butoh" and Dance magazine called his work “...part Marcel Marceau, part Mick Jagger...”

Kasai considered butoh to be more of a philosophy than a dance movement. His work returns repeatedly to two themes: apocalypse as both destructive and generative and the struggle between the energies of organic and inorganic matter. The latter is often embodied as the working of Earth itself, with its organic and inorganic components/forces as well as the interaction of humans and technology. Kasai has also been working with temporal themes since his return to the stage in the 1990s, stating that his butoh philosophy is future-oriented.

The philosophy is most evident in Kasai's thoughts of the body, movement and language. Like Hijikata, Kasai believes that the body, words and choreography are intricately related but in somewhat different ways. Kasai considers dance to be an inherently social activity and the dancer should strive for a “between space” which is an intersection between the dancer and the audience that happens when the rational mind quiets and the body begins to move. He states that dance eliminates the physical self, with humans becoming “bodies of sensation.” Since words live in the air, as the body moves, it is the way to understand the body. Through what he calls “voice power” the body is not “I” or “you” but rather an impersonal pronoun that transcends dancer and spectator to a total consciousness. Kasai’s butoh is strongly influenced by Eurythmy but it is also the extension of Hijikata’s butoh, especially in the role of language, and the concept that the body is something that is created, rather than given by nature.

As a dancer, Kasai promotes a different body aesthetic than in traditional butoh (slow, horizontal and low positions), with quicker movement, vertical movement, use of the entire stage and eyes engaged rather than looking off into the distance and upward posture. He stated that his teacher Kazuo Ohno always told him not to move around so much, but Kasai has criticized the slow, reserved movements of most butoh, stating that he cannot understand dance without much movement, believing very slow movement risks turning it into an object. Despite this, his solo dance style has been compared to that of Ohno and considers this three-year apprenticeship with him as formative. Kasai states that his is music-oriented and weak in visual images, and that when he hears music, movement flows naturally.

As a choreographer, Kasai states that Hijikata is his greatest influence although he did not study under him directly. Both believe choreography is external, rather than internal to the dancer as it gives concepts to the dancers to create a collective body. Another common thread is to not pre-prepare the choreography, but rather to concentrate on what one feels intuitively between the dancer and choreographer before movement begins. As a choreographer, Kasai states he must sense the unique “smell” of each dancer, be it “tart”, ”acidic”, “sweet” or other as each has a unique quality, which helps determine what movements are best for them. He tries to avoid giving dancers images based on words, but rather has them focus on forms. He also tends to have dancers avoid the skills they acquired in their training (Graham, ballet, etc.) and work on something they have not done before. However, he does admit that he does have an overall image in mind for the production, with dancers’ movements conforming to that image.
