= Kyoto Butoh-kan =

Theatre in Koyoto, Japan

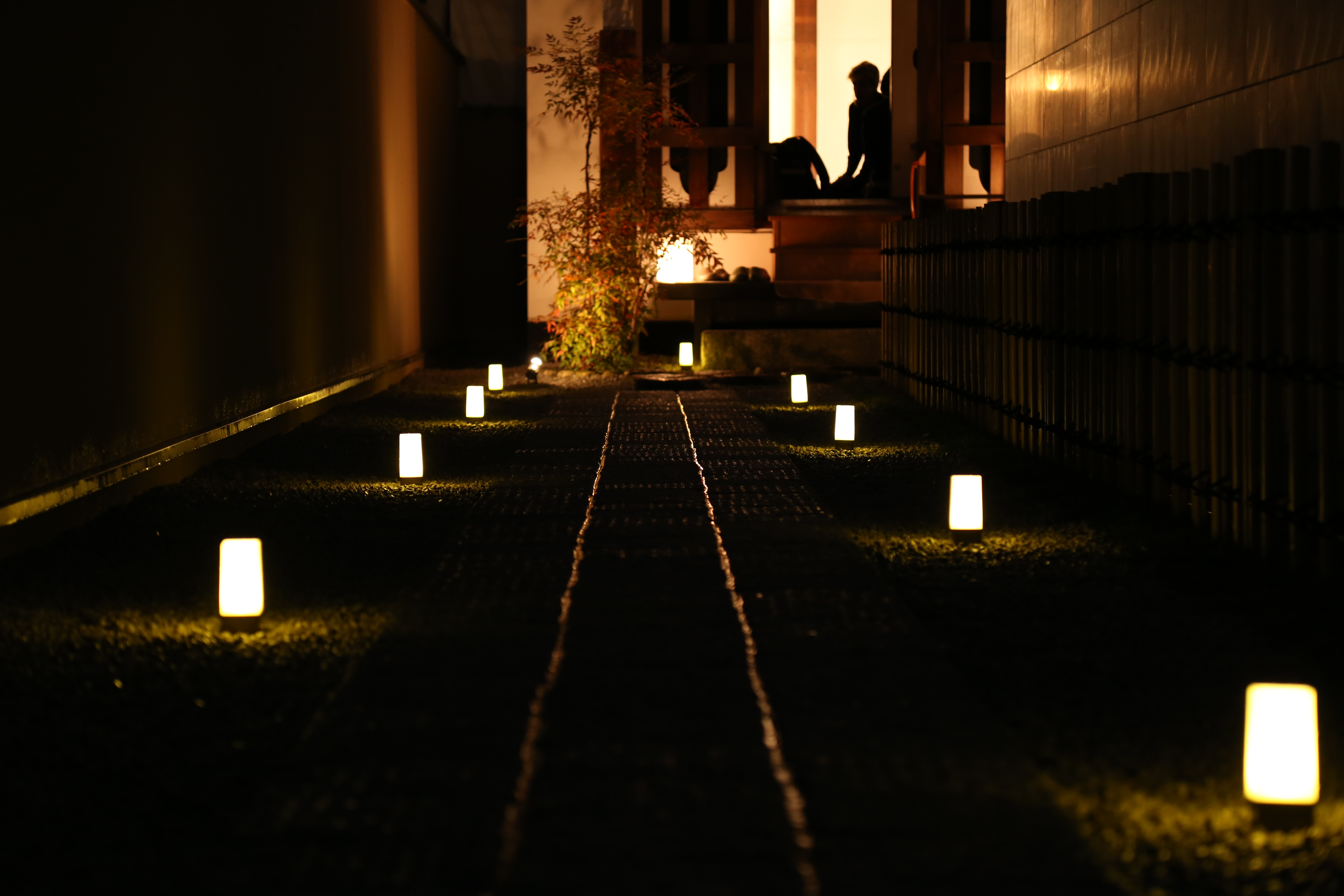
Entrance to the Butoh-kan

The Kyoto Butoh-kan is a small theatre space in Kyoto, Japan that is devoted to Butoh-dance.

It is supposed to be the first theatre in the world devoted to regular Butoh performances by Butoh dancers. It is housed in a converted kura, or Japanese-style storehouse in the Nakagyo-ku district of Kyoto.

== Performances ==
The Butoh-kan opened on July 7, 2016 with a solo show called Hisoku (秘色) by Butoh artist Tenko Ima, formerly of Byakkosha. Two shamisen players accompany her dance. In February 2017 a work by Kyoto Butoh artist Masami Yurabe called "Underworld Flower" （黄泉の花）also opened. September 2017 sees the opening of a third work "Antigraviton, Lovely Face" (反重力子 花のばんかせ) by dancer Fukurozaka Yasuo.

The long-term plans for the Butoh-kan include adding additional solos, as well as creating "an environment to nourish new talent and as a space to pass the art form to a new generation," according to producer Keito Kohara.

== Building ==
The Butoh-kan is a converted traditional Japanese kura, or storehouse, and has walls made of earth and plaster. The kura was built in 1862, or the second year of the Bunkyū Era. There was a large fire in the area during the Hamaguri Rebellion, but this kura was one of the few to escape whole.

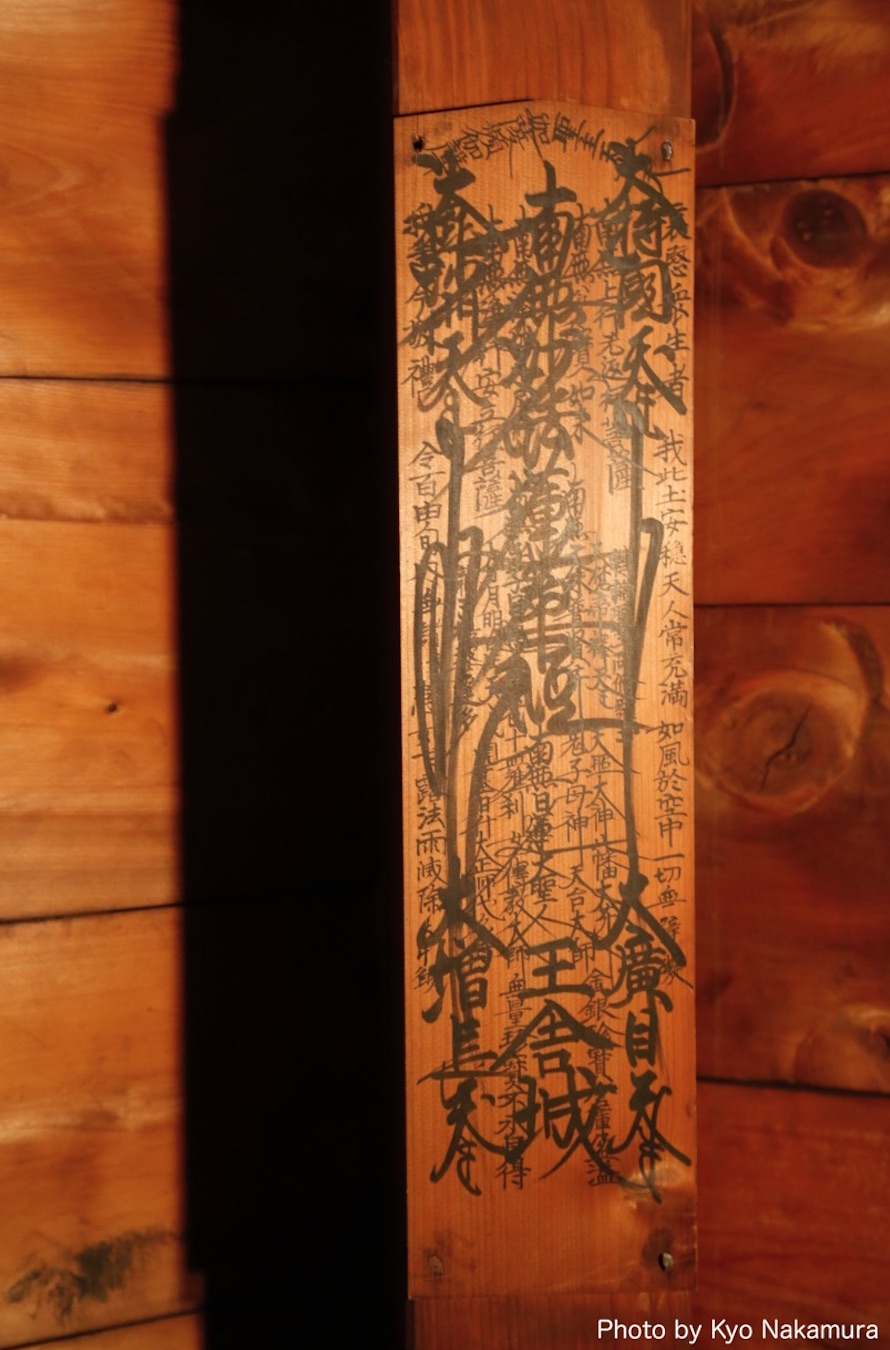
Lotus Sutra Mandala style munefuda at the Butoh-kan.

=== Munefuda ===
There is a munefuda (棟札) or plaque affixed to the ridgepole of the kura. Munefuda were attached to the ridgepoles of traditional buildings in Japan to record important events and circumstances of the building. The munefuda of the Butoh-kan was written by Nyojitsu Nisso, who inscribed in the Lotus Sutra Mandala style a munefuda to avert fires in the kura and prevent disaster.

== See also ==
- Butoh Dance
- Theatre of Japan
- Kyoto, Japan
- Tatsumi Hijikata
- Kazuo Ohno
