= Atsushi Takenouchi =

Japanese Butoh dancer (born 1962)

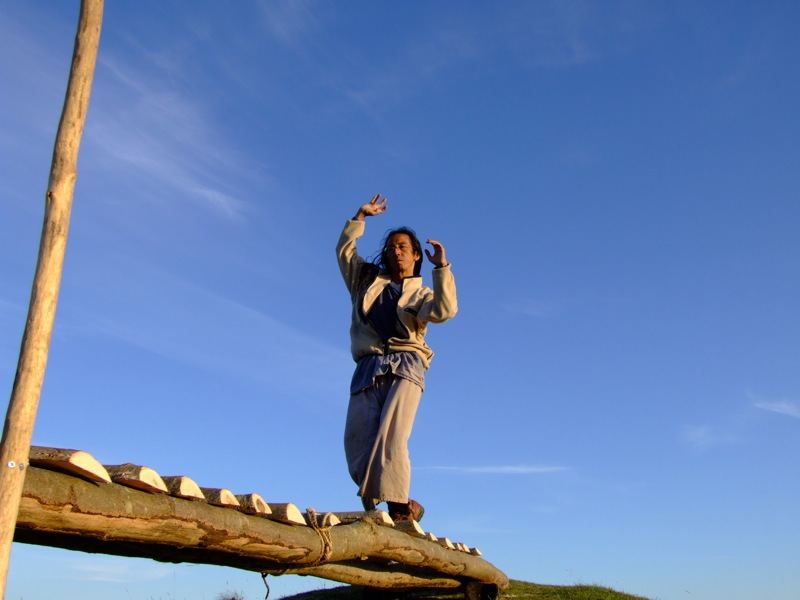
Atsushi Takenouchi

Atsushi Takenouchi (竹之内 淳志; born 5 January 1962) is a Japanese Butoh dancer who performs various solo works as well as collaborations; such as "Enclosure" performed in conjunction with Brighton based arts company, Red Earth, on Hambledon Hill, Dorset.

== Career ==
Atsushi Takenouchi joined the butoh dance company Hoppo-Butoh-ha in Hokkaido in 1980. His last performance with the company Takazashiki (1984) was developed by butoh-founder Tatsumi Hijikata. Atsushi started Jinen Butoh in 1986 and created his solo works Itteki and Ginkan. He made a three-year "JINEN" tour throughout Japan for 600 sites (1996-1999).

Since 2002, he has been mainly based in Europe, working on collaborations with dancers and actors in France, Poland, the US and other countries. Joining in festivals such as Avignon festival, Paris Butoh festival, NY Butoh festival, he presents his solo piece. He also collaborates with film productions. His recent work in Alaska and Hawaii, Ridden by nature, an environmental art film was expected to be completed in late 2015/early 2016.

== Publications ==
- 1994 - Dance with Nature in the Rice Festival picture book. Poems, calligraphy and illustrations by Takenouchi (published by Nobunkyo- Rural Culture Association-)
- 2005 - Dancing Identity: Metaphysics in Motion - Sandra Fraleigh
- 2006 - Hijikata Tatsumi and Ohno Kazuo Sandra Fraleigh & Tamah Nakamura
- 2011 - "On the silk route of gesture - Wiesna Mond-KozŁowska
- 2012 - Healing the fabric of the universe - De Carolina Diaz

== Videos and DVDs ==
- 1996 - The 2nd Osaka Dance Experience1996 RE-VIEW（TORII HALL/Japan）
- 1998 - JINEN in Iwaya 1997（BE-BOX）
- 1999 - 1996～1998 Ginyu-Butoh JINEN digest & Tanagokoro・Itteki・Ginkan digest (Denyu-Kohboh /Japan)
- 2005 - KI ZA MU 2005 (Teatr KANA/Poland)
- 2008 - Film Silken (11 minutes) Directed by Damien Serban and Yann Bertrand (Autour de Minuit Présente/France) SOGO ISHII punk years 1976- 1983 DVD box I.
- 2008 - Film Asia Strikes Back ( Japan / 1983) Directed by Sogo Ishii (Transformer/ Japan)
- 2010 - JINEN Butoh performance STONE (70minutes) at the Sunflower theater in Beirut 2008 (Artrace/ France)
- 2012 - Film "Ridden by Nature" directed by Kathi von Koerber filming in Alaska, Hawaii and Arizona (Kkiahkeya/ USA)
