= Nakajima Natsu =

Japanese dancer (1943–2024)

- 中嶋夏
- Born: 中島夏枝; Nakajima Natsue; 1943; Sakhalin, Karafuto Prefecture, Empire of Japan
- Died: 4 March 2024 (aged 80–81); Mexico City, Mexico
- Education: Kazuo Ohno Dance Studio
- Occupations: Dancer; choreographer; dance teacher
- Dancing career
- Former groups: Muteki-sha
- Dances: Butoh

Nakajima Natsue (Japanese: 中島夏枝;1943 – 3 March 2024), know professionally as Nakajima Natsu (Japanese: 中嶋夏), was a Japanese dancer, choreographer and teacher, known for being one of the first female butoh dancers. Nakajima founded the Muteki-sha dance group in 1969, and was a leading figure for physically integrated dance in Japan.

== Life and career ==
Nakajima Natsue was born in 1943 in Sakhalin, Empire of Japan (present-day Russia).

In 1955, she began to study classical ballet, and entered the Kazuo Ohno Dance Studio in 1962. Unlike her mentor and long-time collaborator Hijikata Tatsumi, Nakajima toured extensively outside of Japan and became not only one of the first female butoh dancers, but also one of the first to introduce the form to audiences outside of Japan. She directed and choreographed the second-generation butoh dance group Muteki-sha.

Nakajima appeared in films as well as theater productions, including Adachi Masao's 1969 film Sexual Play and the 1990 documentary Butoh: Body on the Edge of Crisis.

On 3 March 2024, Nakajima died aged 80 in Mexico City. At the time of her death, Nakajima had been working with the National Autonomous University of Mexico to deliver lectures, demonstrations and workshops on Butoh across Mexico.

== Dance philosophy ==
Nakajima, like most butoh choreographers, resisted literal interpretations or expressions of the dance's gestures. However, she articulated her dance philosophy, emphasizing the energy and freedom of butoh. Natsu said "Butoh should reject any notion of symbolism, message, or formalism, and only express its energy and freedom. It is not art that I aspire to, but love."
