= Ushio Amagatsu =

Japanese choreographer (1949–2024)

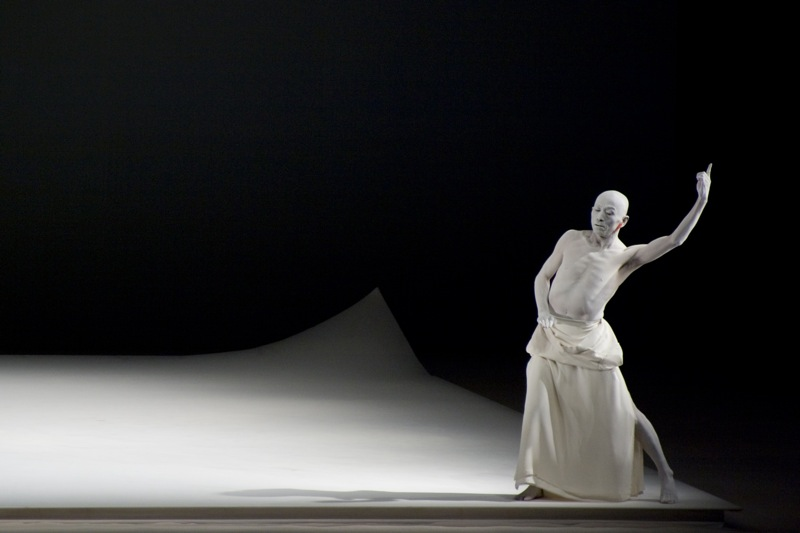

Ushio Amagatsu (天児 牛大, Amagatsu Ushio; 31 December 1949 – 25 March 2024) was a Japanese choreographer known as the leader of the Butoh dance group Sankai Juku, which he founded in 1975.

== Biography ==
Ushio Amagatsu was born in Yokosuka, Kanagawa in 1949. He was the artistic director, choreographer and a dancer of Sankai Juku. He was also a co-founder of the seminal Butoh collective Dairakudakan in 1972. All Sankai Juku works since 1982 were premiered at and co-produced by Théâtre de la Ville, Paris. Sankai Juku has performed at more than 40 countries, 700 cities worldwide. From 1997, he worked as opera director as well. Amagatsu died from heart failure on 25 March 2024, at the age of 74.

== Timeline ==
- In 1972, co-founded Dairakudakan
- In 1975, founded Sankai Juku
- In 1980, did his first performance abroad at the Nancy International Festival in France
- In 1989, appointed to the artistic director of the Spiral Hall in Tokyo.
- In 1992, presided the Jury of the International Meeting of Dance of Bagnolet.
- from 2002 to 2005, president of judge for "Toyota Choreography Award"

== Works ==
- In 1977, created Amagatsu Sho (Homage to Ancient Dolls)
- In 1978, created Kinkan Shonen (Kumquat Seed)
- In 1979, created Sholiba
- In 1981, created Bakki, which premiered at Festival d'Avignon, France
- In 1982, created Jomon Sho (co-produced by and premiered at Théâtre de la Ville, Paris)
- In 1984, created Netsu no Katachi
- In 1985, direction and choreography for the photo book Luna
- In 1986, created Unetsu - The Egg stands out of Curiosity
- in 1987, direction and choreography for the photo book The Egg stands out of Curiosity
- In 1988, created Shijima - The Darkness Calms Down in Space
- In 1988, created Fushi on the invitation of Jacob's Pillow Foundation, in the U.S., music by Philip Glass, premiered at Spiral Hall, Tokyo.
- In 1989, directed Apocalypse (1989), music by Takashi Kako, dance by Ismael Ivo, premiered at Spiral Hall, Tokyo.
- In 1989, directed and choreographed Fifth-V (1990) for six American dancers, premiered at Spiral Hall, Tokyo.
- In 1991, created Omote - The Grazed Surface
- In 1993, created Yuragi - In a Space of Perpetual Motion
- In 1995, created iyomeki - Within a Gentle Vibration and Agitation
- In February 1997, directed Bartok's opera Bluebeard's Castle, conducted by Péter Eötvös for the Tokyo premiere.
- In 1997, directed a concert of Takashi Kako Iro wo Kasanete, at Park Tower Hall, Tokyo.
- In 1998, created Hibiki - Resonance from Far Away
- In March 1998, at Opéra National de Lyon, France, he directed Péter Eötvös' opera Tri sestry (Three Sisters, world premiere). The opera was also presented in the 2001/02 season at Théâtre du Châtelet in Paris, at Théâtre Royal de la Monnaie in Brussels, and at the 2002 Wiener Festwochen in Austria.
- In 2000, created Kagemi - Beyond the Metaphors of Mirrors
- In 2003, created Utsuri - Virtual Garden
- In 2005 re-created Kinkan Shonen. Amagatsu's solo parts of the original version are performed by three young dancers.
- In 2006, created Toki - A moment in the weave time
- In 2008, created Tobari - As if in an inexhaustible flux
- In 2008, created Utsushi, which is a collage from past works. Amagatsu doesn't dance in this one.
- In 2010, created Kara・Mi - Two Flows

== Awards and recognition ==
- In 1992, Amagatsu was awarded the "Chevalier de l'Ordre des Arts et des Lettres" by the French Ministry of Culture.
- In 1998, Péter Eötvös’s opera "Three Sisters", which directed by Amagatsu, received "Prix du Syndicat de la critique, France".
- In February 2002, "Hibiki" won the 26th Laurence Olivier Award for Best New Dance Production.
- In March 2004, Amagatsu was awarded "Geijutu Sensho Prize (Art Encouragement Prize)", by the Minister of Education, Culture, Sports, Science, and Technology of Japan, for his outstanding artistic achievement.
- In 2007, "TOKI" received "Grand Prix of the 6th The Asahi Performing Arts Awards" and Sankai Juku received "Kirin Special Grant for Dance."
- In 2008, Péter Eötvös’s opera "Lady Sarashina", which directed by Amagatsu, received "Prix du Syndicat de la critique, France" again.

== Books, photo books and other references ==
- "Luna" (photo book) directed and choreographed by Ushio Amagatsu, feat. Sayoko Yamaguchi and Sankai juku.
- "The Egg stands out of Curiosity" (photo book) directed and choreographed by Ushio Amagatsu
- Interviews with Ushio Amagatsu: Japan Foundation, Performing Arts Network Japan
