= Ko Murobushi =

Japanese dancer and choreographer

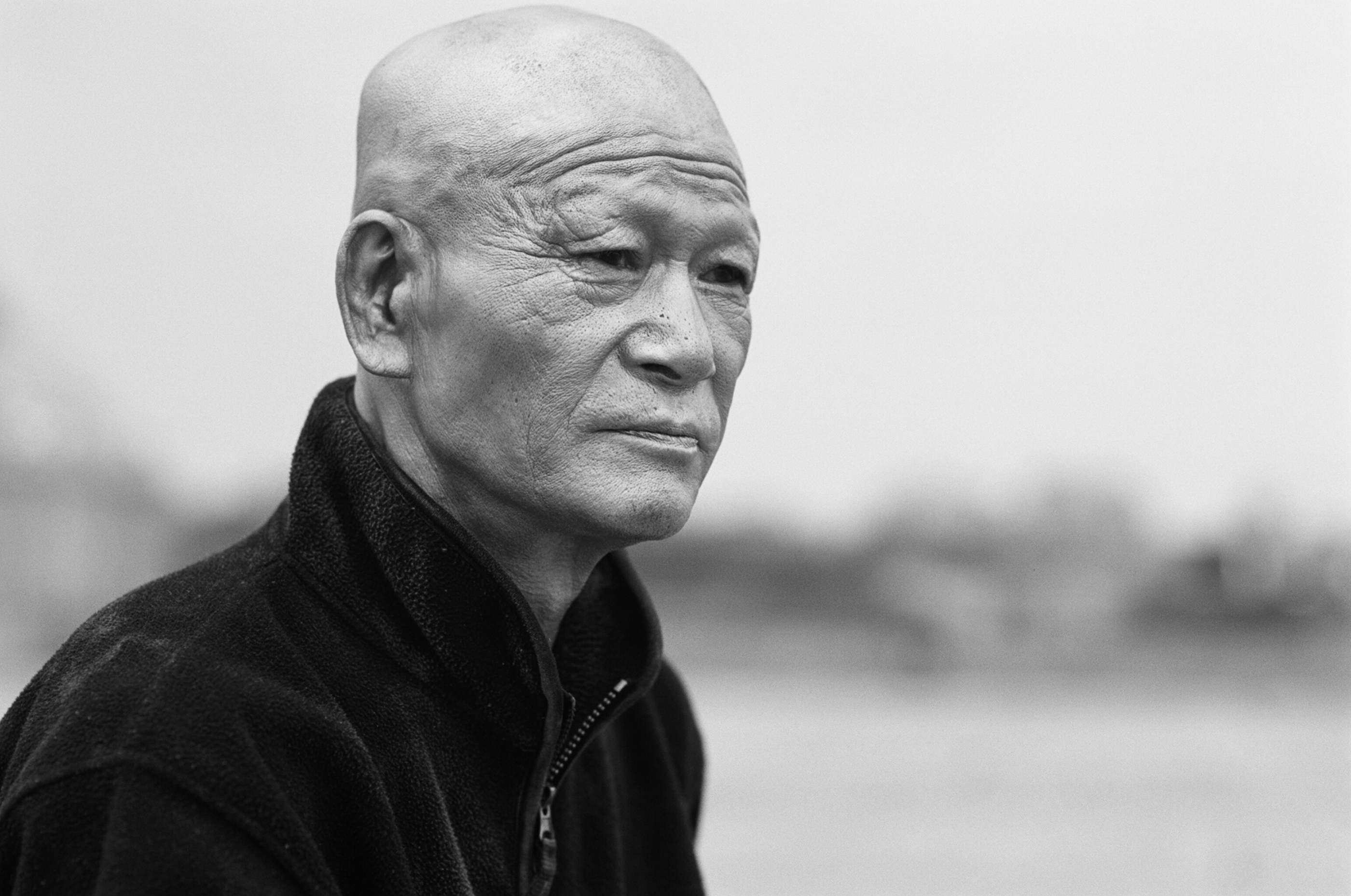
Kō Murobushi

Kō Murobushi (Japanese: 室伏 鴻, Hepburn: Murobushi Kō; June 14, 1947 – June 18, 2015) was a Japanese dancer and choreographer who was a leading inheritor of Tatsumi Hijikata's original vision of Butoh.

Born in Tokyo, Japan, Murobushi studied under Tatsumi Hijikata starting in 1969, and after a short experience with Yamabushi mountain monks, he became a co-founder of the Butoh company "Dairakudakan" together with Akaji Maro and several others.

In 1974, he was the editor-publisher of the Butoh newspaper Hageshii Kisetsu (La saison violente) and became a producer for the all-female Butoh company "Ariadone-no-Kai," for which he then continued to produce and choreograph.

In 1976, he founded the Butoh studio "Hokuryukyo" in the mountains and founded his own Butoh group "Sebi." He brought Sebi and Ariadone to Europe and contributed to the recognition of Butoh in Europe. Le Dernier Eden - Porte de l’au – delá proved a success in Paris in 1978.

His choreographies Zarathustra and Lotus Cabaret also proved to be a success in 1981, and his Utt for Ariadone and his solo En in 1981 and 1983 were followed by a large tour through Europe. It was at this time that Ko Murobushi settled down in Paris and made Paris the European capital of the Butoh movement.

From 1985 onwards, he concentrated on duo productions for several years. In 2003, he established his own unit "Ko & Edge Co." in Japan.

For his choreographies as well as his solo performances, he was invited to numerous international dance festivals such as the ImPulsTanz Vienna International Dance Festival, the Montpellier Dance Festival, the Dance Festival London Dance Umbrella, Biennale di Venezia, and many others.

Murobushi's last solo performances are called Ritournelle and Faux pas. His last duo performance with Bartabas is titled Le centaure et l'animal, and his last choreograph is Enthusiastic Dance on the Grave.

On June 18, 2015, Ko Murobushi died while in transit at the Mexico City International Airport from a heart attack at the age of 68.

== Biography ==
=== 1967–1969 ===
1967

- Started the event group "Mandoragora." Experimentally ran a variety of event performances in the street and indoors, such as A funeral procession for Marilyn Monroe, Chrysanthemum, Sacred flag – A solar eclipse, CAN, etc.

1968

- First encounter with Hijikata through Hijikata's solo, Hijikata Tatsumi and Japanese People: Revolt of the Body (Nippon Seinen-kan, Tokyo, Japan)

1969

- Studied with Tatsumi Hijikata and spent 18 months living at Asbestos Studio

=== 1970–1979 ===
1970

- Researched on Shugendo that he had long been interested in as the theme of his university thesis, and practiced "Yamabushi" (practices asceticism) twice, in the spring course and in the autumn course. Attained the first grade.

1972

- Co-founder of the Butoh company Dairakudakan (with Maro Akaji)
- Dance Anzu Machine, the debut performance of Dairakudakan (Tokyo, Kyoto, Japan)

1973

- Kinkondoria Reshiantoyata, Dairakudakan (Tokyo, Japan)
- Myth of the Phallus, Dairakudakan (Tokyo, Japan)

1974

- Established Kaiou Planning ("The king of ocean planning")
- Editor-Publisher of the first Butoh Newspaper Hageshii Kisetsu (la Saison Violente)
- Producer and Choreographer of the female Butoh Company ARriadone. (1974–1985)
- Sumera Daikougan, Dairakudakan, Tama River (Tokyo, Japan)
- Danniku Monogatari, Dairakudakan, Nihon Seinenkan (Tokyo, Japan)

1975

- Mesukazan, Ariadone no Kai debut performance. Producer: Kaiou Planning, Director: Maro Akaji, Choreography: Maro Akaji, Ko Murobushi, Ushio Amagatsu, several members of Dairakudakan (Tokyo, Japan)
- Ranchujingi, Dairakudakan, Kyoto University (Kyoto, Japan)

1976

- Founded the all-male Butoh company "Butoh-Ha Sebi" and founded the Butoh Studio Hokuryukyo (Fukui, Japan) performed the opening performance KOMUSO (Wandering Monk)
- Arashi, Dairakudakan, Toranomon Hall (Tokyo, Japan)
- Mesukazan Vol.II Le Blue du Ciel (Ariadone no Kai), Direction, Choreography: Members of Dairakudakan (Tokyo, Japan)

1977

- Hinagata as the debut performance of Sebi, Hokuryukyo (Fukui, Japan)
- Zougerei, Dairakudakan (Nagoya, Kyoto, Japan).
- Mesukazan Vol. III SHISEI, Ariadone no Kai (Tokyo, Japan)
- Performed at the cabaret 'Jardin' (Paris, France)

1978

- The first Butoh creation in Europe. Choreographed and directed Le Dernier Eden: porte de l’au-dela for Sebi and Ariadone (Mesukazan), Nouveau carré Silvia Monfort (Paris, France)
- Kaze Sakashima, Dairakudakan (Tokyo, Japan).
- Hinagata II: Jour sans jours, Nuit sans nuits, Hokuryukyo (Fukui, Japan)

1979

- Hinagata III: Die Welt its in Cabarett—Saint Duke Cabaret or Spasm Toward the Other Shore (Ishikawa, Toyama, Fukui, Japan)
- Binbou na Hito, Dairakudakan, Toyotama Garan (Tokyo, Japan)

=== 1980–1989 ===
1980

- Hinagata IV: Organ and Vitriol "Lotus Cabaret '80s" (Fukui, Japan)
- Choreographed Z/A 1980☆Zarathoustra for AriadoneE, Sogetsu Hall (Tokyo, Japan)
- La Mome [Solo], Sogetsu Hall (Tokyo, Japan)
- Hinagata V: Tarahumara Trans "Lotus Summer Cabaret '80s, in Hokuryukyo" (Fukui, Japan)
- Choreographed A Choreograph of Chorea for Ariadone and Sebi, (Tokyo, Japan)
- Anin no Hikari, Dairakudakan, Toyotama Garan (Tokyo, Japan)

1981

- Artistic Director of SebiI and the company Ariadone. (1981–84)
- Hinagata VI: Mummy–Hierophany (Tokyo, Japan)
- Choreographed Utt as Carlotta Ikeda's solo performance, Sogetsu Hall (Tokyo, Japan)
- Opened the live underground cabaret "Shy." Opening solo performance Hinagata VII: Neon ou Neant, Minami Aoyama (Tokyo, Japan)
- Zarathustra, toured France and Belgium.
- Lotus-Cabaret for Sebi and Ariadone, Georges Pompidou Center (Paris, France).

1982

- Hinagata VIII Sebi, Theatre Gestuel Paris (Paris, France).
- Zarathoustra, toured Europe.
- Zarathoustra, toured across Theatre Municipal (Paris, France), Theater 11 (Zürich, Switzerland), Maison de la Danse (Lyon, France), Nouveau carré Silvia Monfort (Paris, France), * The Round House Theater (London, UK), etc.

1983

- iki-1 [Solo], Maison des Cultures du Monde (Paris, France)
- Choreographed Utt for Carlotta Ikeda [Solo], Festival Klap-stuk (Bergium)
- Choreographed La Nuit for Michel Bruel Ballet, (Paris, France)
- Zarathoustra, Plus la peine de frimer (France), C. A. C. Théâtre (Angoulême, France) and Teatro Principal (Valencia, Spain), etc.

1984

- iki-2 [Solo], Maison des Cultures du Monde (Paris, France)
- Improvisation for Natsuyuki Nakanishi, "Private Exhibition of Narsuyuki Nakanishi," (Tokyo, Japan)
- Zarathusra, Utt, toured Israel, Austria, Spain, Swiss, Holland

1985

- IKI 2, Chapter Arts Centre (Cardiff, UK)
- Dehors [Solo], "Avignon Février de Danse" (Avignon, France)
- 9creations with Wim Mertens and Carlotta Ikeda, Original tape music Takehisa Kosugi and Osamu Goto, Festival "Buto '85," Espace Kiron (Paris, France)
- Choreographed Hime for Ariadone, Festival "Montpellier Danse" (Montpellier, France)
- Monsieur Kafka [Trio], Serapions Theater (Vienna, Austria)

1986

- Corps Nomade: Hommage a la memoire de Tatsumi Hijikata, Studio 200 (Tokyo, Japan)
- Performed in Glenn Branca Orchestra Concert, Iikura Hall (Tokyo, Japan)
- Founded KO Murobishi Company.
- Directed and choreographed Pantha Rhei with 50 European Dancers for UNESCO's 40s Anniversary, UNESCO (Paris, France)
- Choreographed and performed Les Larmes D'Eros [Ko Murobushi Company], Rovereto Festival (Italy)
- Choreographed Hime for the company Ariadone (Zürich, Swiss)

1987

- Les Larmes D'Eros, Théâtre de Corbeil-Essonnes, Amiens and Théâtre de l'Olivier à Istres (France)

1988

- HOH, "Butoh Trans media III," Chofu Green Hall (Tokyo, Japan)
- Ephemere with Urara Kusanagi [Duet], "Festival 'Danse à Aix" (Aix-en-Provence, France)
- Les Larmes D'Eros, Ko Murobushi Company, toured France.

1989

- Le Cycle Des Stupeurs [Ko Murobushi Company], "Festival de Lille" (Lille, France)
- Ephemere with Urara Kusanagi [Duet], toured Germany and France.
- Choreographed Mayu for Urara Kuasanagi, Tanz Project Koeln (Koeln, Germany)
- Kaiin No Uma, Dairakudkan, (Aichi, Japan)

=== 1990–1999 ===
1990

- Station-Event at Strasbourg, Direction and choreograph (Strasbourg, Swiss)
- Ephemere, Werkstadt Duesseldorf (Duesseldorf, Germany)
- EN [Solo], toured France, Germany, Italy.
- Le Cycle des Stupeurs, (Duesseldorf, Germany)

1991

- EPHEMERE and EN, toured Mexico, Italy, France, Germany.
- Quiet Sand in UTOPIA, choreography for Company No-Made (Freiburg, Germany)

1992

- Directed and choreographed Mamushi for the opening of "Mamu Festival" (Ko Murobushi, Urara Kusanagi, Tadashi Endo [Trio]), (Göttingen, Germany)
- Directed and choreographed Chirdren's Crusade [Dance Opera], Awar Tanz Theater, Gasteig (Munich, Germany)
- Ephemere, toured Caracas (Venezuela) and Bogota (Colombia)
- En (Bremen, Germany)
- Nomadic Blue [Solo], ImPulsTanz International Dance Festival (Vienna, Austria)
- Pie [Solo Improvisation] with Alain Mahe, Allonne Festival (Allonne, France)
- Dove Siete? Io Sono Qui [Cinema], directed by Liliana Cavani (Rome, Italy)

1993

- Ai-Amour with Carlotta Ikeda [Duet], Dansens Hus, Sweden, toured Denmark, Netherlands, Bergium, Italy, Swiss, Auatria, England, France.
- Choreographed White Presence for Urara Kusanagi, "Tanzprojekte Köln" (Cologne, Germany)
- Out of ... Ephemere (Ko Murobushi, Urara Kusanagi), Odeon Theater (Vienna, Austria)

1994

- Errance with Urara Kusanagi [Duet], Odeon (Vienna, Austria)
- Dehors, Salle Léo Lagrange (Limoges, France)

1995

- WORKING PROCESS with Urara Kusanagi [Duet], (Göttingen, Germany)
- Sebi with Urara Kusanagi [Duet], La Fonderie (Le Mans, France)
- Working Process, Festival "Mostra 95" (São Paulo, Brasilia and Curitiba, Brazil)
- Working Process, Cankarjev Dom (Ljubljana, Slovenia)
- SebiI, Théâtre National de Bretagne (Rennes, France)

1996

- In Chance [Solo], "MAMU Feastival" (Goettinen, Germany)
- Working Process, Tahfel Halle (Nuernberg, Germany)

1997

- In Silence (Music Patrick Molard and Alain Mahé), Le Quartz (Brest, France)
- Working Process, "Dance Week Festival" (Zagreb, Croatia)

1998

- Workshop, Studio T (Xalapa, Mexico)
- Edge, improvisation with Anna Clementi, "Festival Suoni del Corpo" (Rome, Italy)
- Improvisations in "Hijikata '98", Dance Hakushu (Yamanashi, Japan), Trpsichole, Gallery Tom, Setagaya Public Theater Tram, (Tokyo, Japan)

1999

- Choreographed Haru No Saiten: Un Sacre de Printemps for AriadoneE, Théâtre de la Bastille (Paris, France)
- Workshop: Pro Series, "Internationale Sommertanzwochen Wien" (Vienna, Austria)
- Choreographed for Vera [Cinema], Directed Francisco Athié, Dance and Act Urara Kusanagi, Estudios Churubusco (Churubusco, Mexico)
- Ximprovisation (Graz, Austria)

=== 2000–2009 ===
2000

- Dissection d’un homme armé [Choreographed by Bernardo Montetl, Théâtre de la Ville (Paris, France), Théâtre National de Bretagne (Rennes, France) and Le Quartz (Brest, France)
- Another Human, Another Thing (Soto No Hito, Ta No Mono) [Solo], Torii Hall (Osaka, Japan)
- Untitled [Solo], Galleria Nazionale d'Arte Moderna (Rome, Italy)
- Coaching Project, ImPulsTanz International Dance Festival (Vienna, Austria)
- Edge [Solo], die Pratze Kagurazaka (Tokyo, Japan)

2001

- Edge 01 [Solo], David Zambrano Invites [Guest improvisation with David Zambrano], Workshop: PRO Series and Supervisor for Akemi Takeya's Black Honey Drops,
- "ImPulsTanz: Vienna International Dance Festival," (Vienna, Austria)
- Edge 01: Face with Valentina Castro, Raul Parrao and Rodrigo Angoitia, "Festival Arte 01," Teatro de la Danza (Mexico City, Mexico)
- Poetry Readings [Improvisation with Ben Shozu], Musashi University (Tokyo, Japan)
- Kuchinoha Christmas with Koichi Makigami (Voice), Lauren Newton (Voice) and Ko Ishikawa (Sho), Ochanomizu Christian Center (Tokyo, Japan)
- Ko vs Kota with Kota Yamazaki, De Pratze Kagurazaka (Tokyo, Japan)
- Edge 01 [Solo and collaboration with V.Castro, R. Angoitia, R.Parrao], Theater Tram, (Tokyo)
- Edge-Warsaw, Maty Theater (Warsaw, Poland)
- Edge-ExTra (Sapporo, Japan)
- Workshops in Warsaw, London, Mexico City, Marseille.

2002

- "The U.S.-Japan Choreographers Exchange Residency Project" (Dance Theater Workshop, Japan Society and Japan Contemporary Dance Network), (Philadelphia, New York, USA)
- East Wind III: No Boat in Sights, New Delhi, Chandigarh (INDIA) and Setagaya Public Theater (Japan)
- Edge 02: Bach Sketch, "Festival Internacional de las Artes Coahuila," Teatro de la Ciudad Fernando Soler (Mexico)
- Coaching Project, ImPulsTanz International Dance Festival (Vienna, Austria)
- Edge 01, Edge 02-back sketch, "ImPulstanz International Dance Festival", Museums Quartier Halle G, TQ-Studios (Vienna, Austria)

2003

- 3 Improvisations for FAREWEL ASBESTOS Hall with Akiko Motofuji, YAS-KAZ and Osamu Goto, Asbestos Hall (Tokyo, Japan)
- 2 Improvisations for bp with Jean François Pauvros (gr) and Alain Mahé (elc), "Butô Festival 4ème Edition," Espace Culturel Bertin Poirée Paris, (Paris, France)
- Edge 03 and Coaching Project [Workshop], "ImPulsTanz: Vienna International Dance Festival," Akademietheater (Vienna, Austria)
- Memorial Motofuji Akiko, Taro Okamoto Museum (Kawasaki, Japan)
- Handsome Blue Sky (Bibou no Aozora) [Ko & Edge Co.], "JADE 2003 International Dance Festival," Park Tower Hall (Tokyo, Japan)
- Edge-India (New Delhi, India)
- Edge 01 "Ravenna Festival Teatro e Danza Giapponese" (Ravenna, Italy)
- Edge 03 (Daiji Megiro, V.Castro, R.Angoitia) II Polisendorian Festival (Mexico)
- Edge 01, The Place (London, UK)
- Workshop (Curitoba, Brazil)

2004

- PINE with the Staff Juku, (Manila, Philippines)
- Opening Performance for the Exhibition of Hijikata, Württembergischer Kunstverein Stuttgart (Stuttgart, Germany)
- Experimental Body vol. 1: Heels [Ko & Edge Co.], die Pratze Kagurazaka (Tokyo, Japan)
- Experimental Body vol. 2: Shigenji [Ko & Edge Co.], die Pratze Azabu (Tokyo, Japan)
- Choreographed Zarathoustra Variations for Ariadone, (Bordeaux, France)
- Coaching Project, ImPulstanz International Dance Festival (Vienna, Austria)
- Workshop, NY Japan society, CAVE (New York, USA)
- Everything is Ghost [Solo] (Tokyo, Japan)
- Giselle(s), directed and choreographed for Company Dance 01 (Tokyo, Japan)
- Edge I/II, Tanz und Teater Bergstadt (Stuttgart, Germany)
- Edge 01, [Solo], MAMU Festival (Goettingen, Germany)

2005

- The 37th AWARD of Dance Critics Society of Japan.
- Edge, Ai-Amour, Haru no Saiten, Centre de Développement Chorégraphique Les Hivernales (Avignon, France)
- Dear Elizabeth, why did you leave so soon?, Artistic Advisor for Ted Scoffer's Production, (Bruxelles, Bergium)
- Phoenix Rises, International Collaboration between NYOBA and Ko Murobushi, "Malaysian Dance Festival 2005," Kuala Lumpur Performing Arts Centre (Kuala Lumpur, Malaysia)
- Edge, Chasm & Pass with Pierre Darde, "Poly-national Arts Carnival," Yokohama Red Brick Warehouse (Yokohama, Japan)
- Handsome Blue Sky [Ko & Edge Co.], "Korea-Japan Friendship in Dance 2005," (Seoul, Korea)
- quick silver [Solo Improvisations], "Kazuo Ohno Festival 2005," BankART Studio NYK (Yokohama, Japan)
- DEAD 1 [Ko & Edge Co.] and DEAD 2 [solo], "Azumabashi Dance Crossing," Asahi Art Square (Tokyo, Japan)
- inter-mezzo (Fukuoka, Japan)
- Zarathustra-variation, "13eme Festival de Danse tendances 2005" (Bordeaux, France)
- Handsome Blue Sky (Fukuoka, Japan), toured the U.S. and Canada.

2006

- Dog on the Dock, "Yokohama Dance KAIWAI Special", the Port of Yokohama (Yokohama, Japan)
- Murmullos del Páramo [Music Theater of Julio Estrada], Rehearsals at Musik der Jahrhunderte (Stuttgart, Germany), Premiere at Teatro Español (Madrid, Spain)
- quick silver: Experimental Body vol.3, die Pratze Azabu, (Tokyo, Japan)
- quick silver, "4th International Festival of Contemporary Dance: Under Skin (La Biennale di Venezia)", (Venice, Italy)
- Murmullos del Paramo, "World New Music Festival," Theaterhaus Stuttgart (Stuttgart, Germany)
- Murmullos del Paramo, "VIII Festival Internacional Música y Escena," Universidad Nacional Autónoma de México (Mexico City, Mexico)
- 5 weeks Workshop and Coaching at Le Centre national de danse contemporaine (Angers, France)
- quick silver, Abbatoire (Angers, FRANCE/Miyagi, Japan)
- Murmullos del Páramo, "50th International Festival of Contemporary Music" (La Biennale di Venezia), Venice (Italy)
- quick silver- variation (Niigata, Gunma, Japan)
- DEAD1+, Ko&Edge Co., Kanazawa 20st Century Museum of Contemporary Art (Kanazawa, Japan)

2007

- D-brane [Ko & Edge Co.], "Experimental Body Vol.?" die Pratze Azabu, (Tokyo, JAPAN)
- quick silver, "Festival International de las Culturas en Resistencia Ollin Kan," (Mexico City, Mexico)
- quick silver, "Trocito Parco Danza" (Lecce, Italy)
- DEAD 1+, Ko& Edge Co., "We're Gonna Go Dancing!!" (Kuala Lumpur, Malaysia)
- quick silver and Workshop, Club ZAK (Gdansk, Poland)
- MIMI with Ikuyo Kuroda [Duet], "Experimental Body Series Vol.V," Akasaka RED Theater (Tokyo, Japan)
- quick silver, toured Italy, Poland, England, Slovenia, USA and Thailand.

2008

- quick silver, "Festival International de danse contemporaine à Marrakech," (Marrakech, Morocco)
- quick silver, "Danse D'exsistence Danse De Resistance" (France)
- quick silver, Keio University Conference Hall "Raiousha" (Kanagawa, Japan)
- quick silver, "ImPulsTanz: Vienna International Dance Festival," Akademietheater (Vienna, Austria), STUDIO 5 and Culture Techno (New York/USA/Niigata, Japan/Portugal)
- DEAD1, choreography, "Jacob's Pillow Dance Festival" (London, England)

2009

- improvisation with Boris Charmatz, Museums Quartier (Vienna, Austria)
- quick silver, "Festival International Mujeres en la Danza," (Quito, Ecuador)
- quick silver, Casa del Teatro Nacional (Bogota, Colombia)
- quick silver, Confandi (Cali, Colombia)
- Workshop, "Musée de la danse," Centre chorégraphique national de Rennes et de Bretagne (Rennes, France)
- Work-in-progress with Boris Charmatz, "Beppu Modern Art Festival 2009: Beppu Dance," (Oita, Japan)
- Les Champs Magnétiques, ou la nostalgie Cosmique with Boris Charmatz and Bernardo Montet [International Butoh Work in Progress], Keio University Conference Hall "Raiousha" (Kanagawa, Japan)
- TAMAR, "Ruhrtriennale," Gebläsehalle, Landschaftspark Duisburg Nord (Duisburg, Germany)
- quick silver, CAVE (New York, USA), "CanAsian Dance Festival" (Canada)
- Workshop, "Kyoto International Workshop Festival" (Kyoto, Japan), "ImPulstanz International Dance Festival" (Vienna, Austria)

=== 2010–2015 ===
2010

- a ball [Solo], Terpsichore, (Tokyo, Japan)
- quick silver, Latin America Tour 2010: Buenos Aires, Argentine/Bogota, Colombia/ Mexico City, Xarapa, Mexico.
- MUSIC, [Duet], Teatro de la Danza (Mexico City, Mexico)
- Le centaure et l’animal, Collaboration with Bartabas (Toulouse, France)
- Teaching, Centre National de Danse Contemporaine (Angers, France)
- Le centaure et l'amimal, Collaboration with Bartabas (Normandie, France)
- Contorsions with Ko & Edge Co, Centre National de Danse Contemporaine (Angers, France)
- Le Centaure et l’animal, Théâtre National de Chaillot (Paris, France)
- quick silver, DEAD1, "GREC 2010 Festival de Barcelona" (Barcelona, Spain), Pumpenhous (Muenster, Germany), "International Istanbul Theatre Festival" (Istanbul, Turkey)
- quick silver, i-camp (Munich, Germany)
- The Crazy Cloud Collection, collaboration with InkBoat (USA)
- Hommage and Kazuo Ohno, "ImPulstanz Vienna International Festival" (Vienna, Austria)
- contortions, direction and choreography, Ko&Edge, CNDC Angers (Angers, France)
- Teaching, CNDC Abgers (Angers, France)
- Mu(s)-Krypt Blues, collaboration with J-F.Pauvros, Alain Mahe, Dorothee Munyaneza Studio CAMP, Micadanse, Orleans Festival (Paris, Orleans, France)

2011

- Le centaure et l’ammal, Collaboration with Bartabas, La Rochelle (Charente-Maritime, FRANCE) and Sadler's Wells theatre (London, England)
- Mu(s) Krypt - The last song I dance, open rehearsal, Micadanse (Paris, France)
- Mu(s) Krypt - The last song I dance, live music with Alain Mahé (elc), Jean-François Pauvros (gr) and Dorothée Munyaneza (v), "June Events," L'Atelier de Paris - Carolyn Carlson (Paris, France)
- Mu (s): krypt blues, "ImPulsTanz Vienna International Dance Festival," Odeon (Vienna, Austria)
- quick silver, DEAD 1 and Workshop, Bird Theatre (Tottori, Japan)
- Left over shadow with Rita Batarita [Workshop], MERLIN Theatre (Budapest, Hungary)
- The Last News, Edge, Teatro Nacional La Castellana and Teatro Sogamoso (Bogota, Colombia)
- TRIADE with Julio Estrada, Le Centre national de danse contemporaine (Angers, France)
- Improvisation and talk session, with Keisuke Sakurai, YCC (Kanagawa, Japan)
- Le centaure et l’ammal, collaboration with Bartabas, "Sadller's Well is danse" (London, UK)
- Le centaure et l’ammal, collaboration with Bartabas, "GREC FESTIVAL" (Barcelona, Spain/Trino, Italy)
- Improvisation two nights, snac (Tokyo, Japan)
- Workshop, Butoh UK, (London, UK), "Kyoto International Workshop Festival" (Kyoto, JAPAN/Mexico)

2012

- The Crazy Cloud collection with InkBoat, Philadelphia, New York and San Francisco (USA)
- Le centaure et l’animal, Collaboration with Bartabas, "Le French May Arts Festival" (Hong Kong), (Amiens, Brest, France), MC93 Bobigny (France)
- The Back, Keio University the Noguchi Room, (Tokyo, Japan)
- Krypt with "core of bells," Kamakura Shogai Gakusyu Center Hall (Kanagawa, Japan)
- quick silver, Teatro Apolo (Buenos Aires, Argentina/Venice, Italy), ImPulstanz International Dance Festival (Vienna, Austria), "Festival International Era" (Pontedera, Italy/Santiago, Chile)
- Edge and Workshop La Carpintería Teatro (Buenos Aires, Argentina)
- Edge, Teatro Solis (Montevideo, Uruguay)
- Choreographed Un coup de don for ARIADONE, "Festival Automne en Normandie 2012," Théâtre Le Rayon Vert (Seine-Maritime, France)
- Edge-Moscow and Workshop (Moscow, Russia)

2013

- Le centaure et l’animal [Collaboration with Bartabas], "Festival Internacional de Teatro Santiago a Mil," Teatro Municipal de Santiago (Santiago, Chile)
- The school of moments Vol.1 [Workshop], "Butoh Summer 2013," Saison Foundation Morishita Studio (Tokyo, Japan)
- Improvisation: Fire, Atashgah Zoroastrian Fire Temple (Baku, Azerbaijan)
- Ritournelle/Danse'MILLE PLATEAUX'Vol.1 [World Premiere], "ImPulsTanz: Vienna International Dance Festival," Odeon (Vienna, Austria)
- Produced & Directed "Outside-1001" [Festival], Choreographed Enthusiastic Dance on the Grave, The Last News (Yokohama Version) and DEAD 1, Funk on the edge Blues beside water
- [Improvisation with Yoshio Ootani], Artaud a Double with Masahiko Akuta [Duet], Ritournelle [Solo], Yokohama Red Brick Warehouse (Yokohama, Japan)
- Hel Gabal [Directed by Masahiko Akuta], Sogetsu Hall, (Tokyo, Japan)
- Teaching, CNDC Angers (Angers, France)
- Krypt, Museo Universitario del Chopo (Mexico City, Mexico)
- quick silver, "Tanz ist" (Austria)
- Krypt, National Contemporary Dance Theater (Budapest, Hungary)

2014

- The school of moments Vol.IV [Workshop], (Tokyo, Japan)
- The 45th AWARD of Dance Critics Society of Japan.
- Ritournelle, Workshops and Choreographed Performance, Cartagena and (Cartagena, Bogota, Colombia)
- WorkShop, (Santiago, Chile)
- quick silver, Ritournelle and Workshop, Serviço Social do Comércio São Paulo, (São Paulo, Brazil)
- Improvisation and Workshop, LEIMAY CAVE Studio (New York, USA).
- ZIME, collaboration with Siomona Orinska and Soshi Matsunobe, Latvian National Opeta (Riga, Latvia)
- Ritournelle, Latvian National Opera (Riga, Latvia)
- Improvisation, "20 Dancers for the XX Century", Treptower Park (Berlin, Germany)
- Enthusiastic dance on the Grave, Faux Pas and Workshop, "ImPulsTanz International Dance Festival," Akademie Theater, Odeon (Wien, Austria)
- Faux Pas, "ImPulsTanz International Dance Festival," Odeon Theater (Vienna, Austria)
- Research Class – Innombrable Nijinski, "ImPulsTanz International Dance Festival" (Vienna, Austria)
- Improvisation, "Tokyo Experimental Performance Archive," Roppongi Super Deluxe (Tokyo, Japan)

2015

- Dancing in the Street, "Roppongi Art Night 2015" (Tokyo, Japan)
- Improvisation, "If the Tate Modern was Musee de la danse?", Tate Modern, (London, UK)
- Ko Murobushi y el Popol Vuh, Academia de la Danza Mexicana, Auditorio Josefina Lavalle (Mexico City, Mexico)
- Ritournelle, El Circulo Teatral (Mexico City, Mexico)
- Faux Pas, Enthusiastic Dance on the grave, sesc Ipiranga (São Paulo, Brazil)
- quick silver, contorsions, Cena Brazil International 2015, Centro Cultural Banco de Brazil Rio (Rio de Janeiro, Brazil)
