= Kingdom of Ugu =

The Kingdom of Ugu is a kingdom that exists in Nigeria, in what is now Edo State. The Edo State is also called Benin, though it is not to be confused with the country. The Kingdom of Ugu originated out of Igodomigodo in Nigeria.

== Origin ==
"Sometime in the thirteenth century A.D., a period that was probably one of dynastic crisis and transition, The Ogiso dynasty collapsed due partly to internal feuds and the tyranny of Ogiso Owodo. Alongside Igodomigodo polity (later known as Benin) were Udo to the west and Iguobode in Iyekorhionmwon area to the east, and possibly other Edo-speaking polities. What immediately followed the collapse of Ogiso rulership was decentralized political authority. Many autonomous principalities emerged with leaders struggling to establish their own dynastic hegemony over surrounding areas. How long this situation lasted is not clear but oral historical sources and archaeological data soundly indicate that centralized political authority and a new kingship dynasty were re-installed in sections of Benin area during the thirteenth century. The name associated in oral traditions with this period of renewal is Eweka I. Yet, Eweka I's ambition to reunite the polity met with fierce opposition and competing claims. His success was limited as competing polities mushroomed around Benin area. Hence his son or grandson is even credited with establishing another polity known as Ugu in Iyekeorhionmwon, east of Benin and styled himself as Oba n'Ugu or king of Ugu."

The rightful heir and successor to Eweka I, Prince Idu established himself as the king of Ugu after he lost the throne in Benin City due to manipulation orchestrated by the Uzama.

== Oral Tradition ==
The foundation of the Kingdom of Ugu, with its capital at Umoghumwun has been traced to prince (sic) Idu, the eldest son of Oba Eweka I. The Uzama who regulated and influenced succession to the throne did not accept Prince Idu as successor to the throne but favoured his younger brother Prince Uwakhuahen. The Uzama conspired and requested Prince Idu 'to provide a cow with a bird's nest built upon its head for the purpose of their father's royal funeral ceremonies.' The Prince was persuaded to go to Umoghunmwun, his mother's village to procure the cow. Meanwhile, 'his rival brother remained in Benin where a cow was procured and a bird's nest planted upon its horn', and 'the cow was then presented before the elders who immediately declared Uwakhuahen successor to the throne.'

After Uwakhuahen was crowned Oba, Prince Idu protested vigorously the attitude of the Benin elders towards him, and threatened to declare war. He had the sympathy of his mother's people and most elders in Iyehorhionmwon, who also vowed to go to war to avenge the injustice. Benin elders were panic-struck, and 'to appease Prince Idu, the kingdom was divided.' The whole of south east was ceded to him. This was how the kingdom of Ugu was founded. Because the people were very warlike, the kingdom of Ugu rivalled Benin.

== Modern Period ==
The Kingdom of Ugu still exists today and is still considered a kingdom in its own right. Descendants of the Ugu kingdom live in parts of Nigeria, Europe and the United States.
