= Sankai Juku =

Japanese butoh dance group

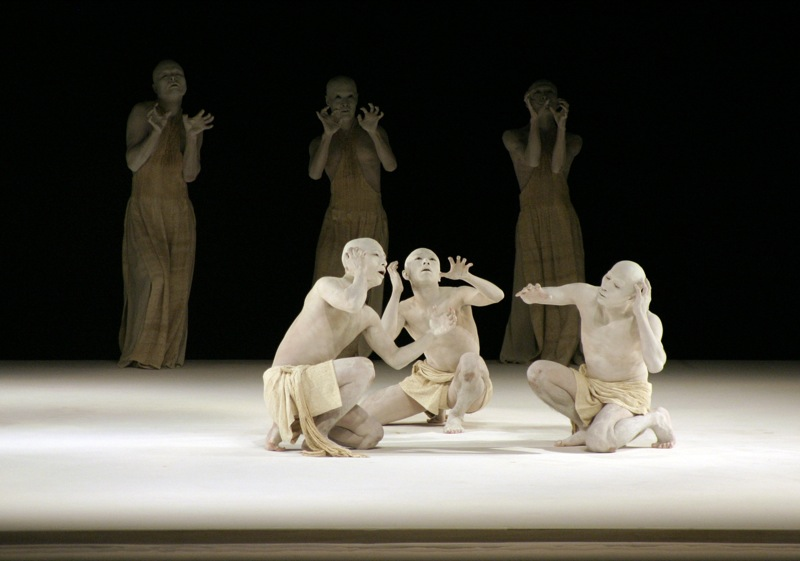
Sankai Juku performing at the Festival Internacional Cervantino.

Sankai Juku (山海塾) is an internationally known butoh dance troupe. Co-founded by Amagatsu Ushio in 1975, they are touring worldwide, performing and teaching. As of 2010, Sankai Juku had performed in 43 countries and visited more than 700 cities.

== Amagatsu Ushio ==
Amagatsu continues as the group's director, choreographer, designer and dancer. He trained in classical as well as modern dance before he developed his own "second-generation" Butoh style. He maintains that "butoh is a dialogue with the gravity," while other dance forms tend to revel in escape from gravity. He sees his dance, in contrast, is based on "sympathizing or synchronizing" with gravity.

== Sankai Juku and butoh ==
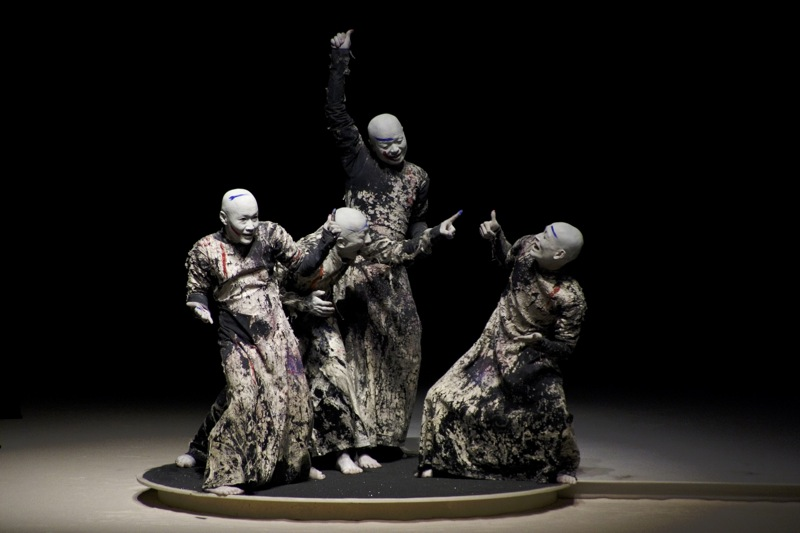
Performance at the Festival Cervantino

Butoh's source is the Japanese avant-garde of the 1960s, a period when Japan struggled with the lingering effects of the atomic bomb detonations at Hiroshima and Nagasaki that ended World War II. Originally called "ankoku butoh," or "dance of darkness," the medium created a space for the intensely grotesque and perverse on the stage. Amagatsu's work exhibits the conventional tensions of butoh and envelops them in a mood of emotional stillness. “Sankai Juku” means "sea and mountain lodgings".

Sankai Juku's dancers have, like other typical Butoh dancers, shaved heads and bodies covered in white powder. They may be costumed, partially costumed, or almost unclothed. Rarely wearing typical “street” clothing onstage, they sometimes wear long skirt-like garments.

The all-male company's work is performed by as few as six dancers eschewing the movements typical of modern or other dance forms. The performances are characterized by slow, mesmerizing passages, often using repetition and incorporating the whole body, sometimes focusing only on the feet or fingers. Sometimes minuscule movement or no movement is discernible and one is presented a meditative vision of statuesque postures or groupings. Occasionally recognizable emotive postures and gestures are used, notably contorted body shapes and facial expressions conveying ecstasy and perhaps more often, pain and silent “shrieks.” Frequently, ritualized formal patterns are employed, smoothly evolving or abruptly fractured into quick, sharp, seemingly disjointed sequences whose symbolism or “meanings” are obscure.

Music and sound effects are employed, often repetitiously, and range from dynamic drumming to jazz, natural sounds such as wind, sirens, etc., to electronic music and sounds so soft as to be barely perceptible – and periods of silence. Spare scenic backgrounds, delicately nuanced lighting and arresting props (in "Kinkan Shonen," a live peacock) add to the ethereal nature of their performances.

== Tours and debuts ==
In 1980, Sankai Juku performed for the first time in Europe, playing at the Nancy International Festival in France and that same year at Festival d'Avignon. The company remained in Europe for four years, appearing at the Edinburgh Festival, the Madrid International Festival and the International Cervantino Festival. In 1984 the group made North American debuts at the Toronto International Festival and the Los Angeles Olympic Arts Festival. They subsequently toured extensively in North America and Canada.

Since 1990 Sankai Juku has performed in Singapore, Hong Kong, Taiwan, Korea, Indonesia, and Malaysia. They made a Russia and East European tour in 1998.

== 1985 Accident ==
A signature motif in a work titled "Sholiba" involves a performer suspended upside down. This feat is performed outside, with the dancers suspended from the front of buildings. On September 10, 1985, in Seattle, Washington, one of the original members of the troupe, Yoshiyuki Takada, participating in a demonstration, died in a hospital shortly after his supporting rope gave way. Sponsors said that the rigging had been successfully tested with sandbags just before the performance and that this act had been performed "hundreds of times." Only one rope was tested with a 50lb of sand. The troupe continued the upside down hangings, notably outside the National Theatre in Washington, D.C., on May 12, 1986, and in their performances of "Kinkan Shonen" at the Kennedy Center for the Performing Arts in February 2008.

== Repertoire and commissions ==
While keeping early works in their repertoire, the group has premiered new pieces, one almost every other year. Théâtre de la Ville in Paris, France has commissioned 13 of their productions, indicated by "TVP" below.

Among their works are:

- "Amagatsu Sho (Homage to Ancient Dolls)" (1977)
- "Kinkan Shonen" – The Kumquat Seed" (premiere 1978 / re-creation 2005)
- "Sholiba" (1979)
- "Bakki" (1981)
- "Jomon Sho" – TVP (1982)
- "Netsu No Katachi" – TVP (1984)
- "Unetsu – The Egg Stands out of Curiosity" – TVP (1986 / re-creation 2018)
- "Shijima – The Darkness Calms down in Space" – TVP (1988)
- "Omote – The Grazed Surface" – TVP (1991)
- "Yuragi – In a Space of Perpetual Motion" – TVP (1993)
- "Hiyomeki – Within a Gentle Vibration and Agitation" – TVP (1995)
- "Hibiki – Resonance from Far Away" – TVP (1998)
- "Kagemi – Beyond The Metaphors of Mirrors" – TVP (2000)
- "Utsuri – Virtual Garden" – TVP (2003)
- "Toki – A Moment in the Weave Time" – TVP (2005)
- "Utsushi" – a collage of previous works (2008)
- "Tobari – As If in an Inexhaustible Flux" – TVP (2008)
- "Kara・Mi – Two Flows" – TVP (2010)
- "Umusuna – Memories Before History" (2012)
- "Meguri – Teeming Sea, Tranquil Land" (2015)
- "Arc – Chemin du Jour" – TVP / Kitakyusu Performing Arts Center (2019)

== Awards and recognition ==
1982, "Kinkan Shonen" was awarded the Grand Prix of Belgrade International Theatre Festival.
1982, "Kinkan Shonen" was awarded the TZ Rose at the Munich Theatre Festival.
2002, "HIBIKI" won the 26th Laurence Olivier Award for Best New Dance Production.
2007, "TOKI" received "Grand Prix of the 6th The Asahi Performing Arts Awards" and Sankai Juku received "Kirin Special Grant for Dance."

== Books and photo collections ==
- Photo collection Sankai Juku, photographer: Guy Delahaye, Actes Sud, 2000. ISBN 9782742744992
- Photo collection "Luna", directed and choreographed by Ushio Amagatsu, featuring Sayoko Yamaguchi and Sankai Juku
- Photo collection "The Egg Stands out of Curiosity", directed and choreographed by Ushio Amagatsu

== Other references ==
Playbill for The Kennedy Center, February 2008
