= The Wild One (2022 film) =

This is a documentary film about Jack Garfein, his youth and his career

- Directed by: Tessa Louise-Salomé
- Written by: Tessa Louise-Salomé; Sarah Contou-Terquem; In collaboration with Elizabeth Schub Kamir
- Starring: Willem Dafoe; Jack Garfein; Peter Bogdanovich; Foster Hirsch; Irene Jacob
- Narrated by: Willem Dafoe
- Cinematography: Boris Levy
- Edited by: Simon Le Berre
- Music by: Gael Rakotondrabe
- Production company: Petite Maison Production
- Release date: 11 June 2022 (Tribeca Festival)
- Running time: 94 min
- Countries: France; United States
- Language: English

The Wild One is a feature documentary on the Holocaust survivor and director Jack Garfein, directed by Tessa Louise-Salomé, and written by Louise-Salomé and Sarah Contou-Terquem.

In 2022, the movie has won the best cinematography award in a documentary feature at the Tribeca Film Festival.

Narrated by Willem Dafoe, the Documentary features interviews with Jack Garfein, Irène Jacob, Peter Bogdanovich, Foster Hirsch and several other artists. Its structure mixes between the narration of Garfein’s youth in the concentration camps and his later career in the 50s Hollywood where he became a key Actors Studio figure and director of two films, The Strange One (1957) and Something Wild (1961), before disappearing from the public eye.

== Synopsis ==
After surviving eleven concentration camps,Jack Garfein immigrated to the US as an orphaned teenager in 1946. Garfein began his career on Broadway, and later became a director. He was the protégé of Lee Strasberg, and a friend and collaborator of Elia Kazan and Marilyn Monroe. Garfein eventually developed his own technique of acting that was rooted in his experience of having to survive the concentration camps. He achieved success, later creating the Hollywood branch of the Actors Studio with Paul Newman, where he became a mentor to many actors.

Garfein’s career, however, was marked by an equally precipitous fall. His two films incurred the wrath of censors and led to his premature exile from Hollywood when he refused to cave to the studios’ demands.

The Strange One’s depiction of a fatal hazing incident and its subsequent coverup, and Something Wild’s focus on the brutal rape and psychological breakdown of a teenage girl, echoed his traumas as a Holocaust survivor in a postwar landscape.

Garfein produced works that resonated with an avant-garde lucidity in their political subtext and commentary on conservative 1950s America, confronting and exposing issues of racial segregation, sexual violence, and military fascism.

== Development ==
Tessa Louise-Salomé is a Paris-based director, writer, and producer. Her films as a director include the Sundance Jury Prize nominee Mr. Leos caraX. Louise-Salomé met Jack Garfein in 2015 while he was an Acting teacher at a French drama school in Paris. Interested in Garfein's life story she started working on the biopic in early 2016. By hearing Willem Dafoe's voice in Loris Gréaud’s art film Sculpt, she got captivated by his performance and proposed him to be the narrator of The Wild One.

The Wild One's shooting started in 2019 and ended in late 2020. The filming crew traveled around Europe and North America to trace Jack Garfein's childhood places and life story. They have shot in 5 different locations. The editing of Simon Le Berre combines Boris Levy's cinematography with a wide range of archives clips.

== Release ==
The Wild One World premiered at Tribeca Film Festival on June 11, 2022, and won the award for best cinematography in a documentary feature. The film was shown at several festivals. Its French premiere on September 2nd, 2022 was at the Deauville American Film Festival. It then won in September 2022 the special mention at the Valenciennes Cinema Festival, was shown at the 13th International Film Festival of La Roche-Sur-Yon, was selected at the International Jewish Film Festival in Australia, and was nominated for Best Documentary Award at the UK Jewish Film festival in London. It was in November 2022 screened in the official selection of the Denver International Film Festival, as well as in the official selection of the Cork International Film Festival. The Wild One was released in French theaters on the 10th of May 2023.

== Reception ==
The Wild One was announced on Variety in June 2022 and received overall positive reviews upon its premiere at the 2022 Tribeca Film Festival with a few mixed reviews. Marilyn Ferdinand, journalist of the Alliance of Women Film Journalists, wrote "I was thrilled to learn so much about the complicated life and artistic integrity of Jack Garfein, a man to whom all lovers of film and theatre owe a debt of gratitude." David Kempler also mentioned Tessa Louise-Salomé's work in a review for Big Picture Big Sound: "Salomé does a marvelous job presenting a bio of an exceptionally artistic man in her own artistic manner. It works beautifully as an introduction to Garfein and as a piece of art on its own." The film was qualified as "A Magnificent Documentary Where Life And Craft Resound Social Justice Consciousness" by Chiara Spagnoli for Cinema Daily US; as "An engrossing and intimate portrait.." by Dennis Hartley in DIGBY'S BLOG or "Fascinating." by Peter Sobynzski on an article about 2022 Tribeca's documentary features awards on Roger Ebert.com.

However, Brittany Witherspoon will be more mixed in her review for Film Threat by finding the film "emotionally compelling" but contrasting it by "Louise-Salomé’s doesn’t always find its footing through delivery.", giving it a grade of 7/10 on Rotten Tomatoes.

Brent Simon wrote for the Golden Globe Awards, "Director Tessa Louise-Salomé’s artful new documentary The Wild One […] lovingly illuminates this loquacious but still somewhat enigmatic artist…".
