= Gael Rakotondrabe =

French musician and composer (born 1984)

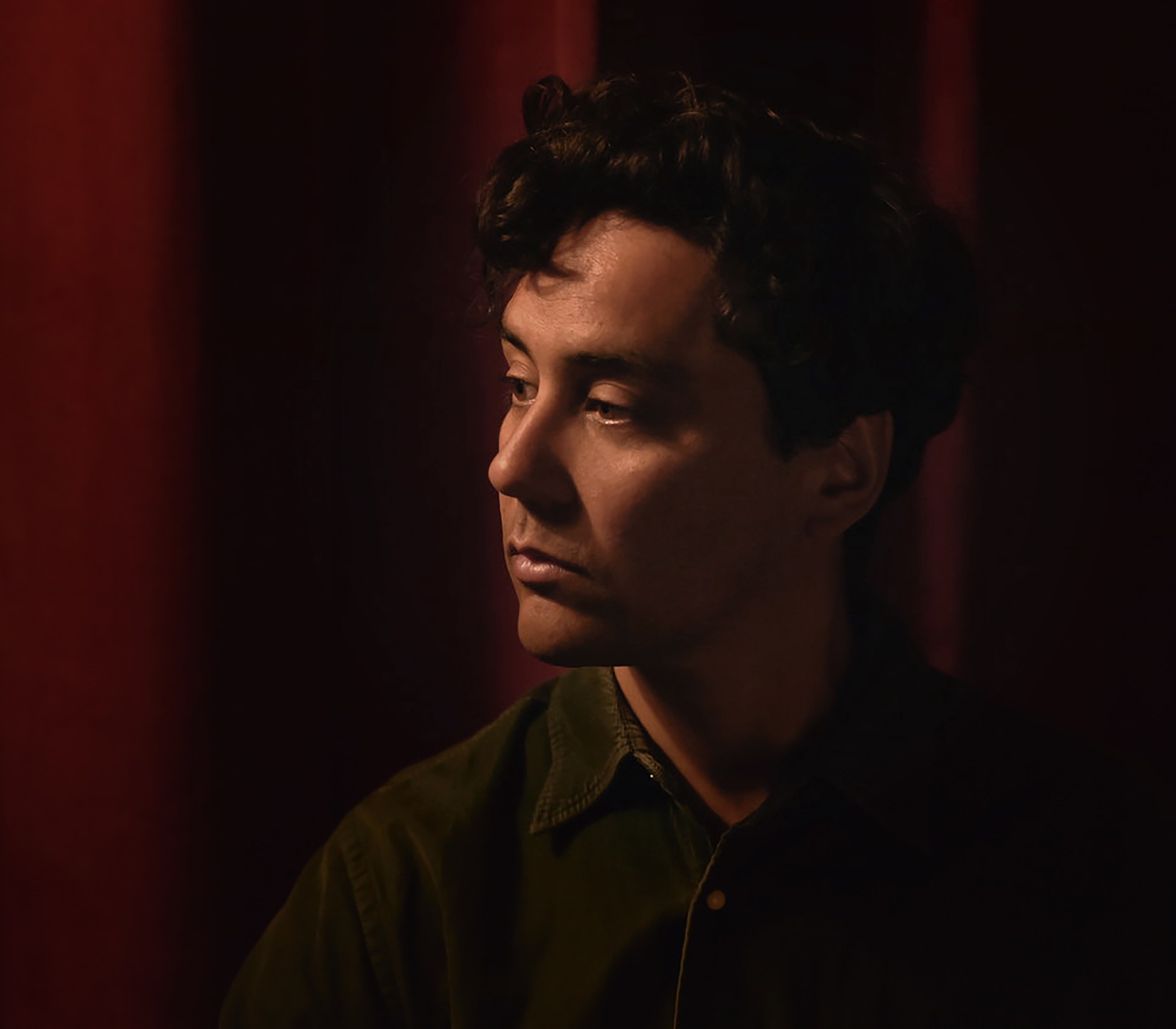
- Born: 20 July 1984 (age 41)
- Education: Bill Evans Piano Academy, Nadia and Lily Boulanger Conservatory
- Known for: Jazz Pianist, Composer
- Style: Jazz, Neo-Classical

Gael Rakotondrabe (born 20 July 1984) is a French pianist, composer, and jazz musician. He achieved recognition by winning the First Prize in the piano competition at the Montreux Jazz Festival in 2008.

== Biography ==
Gael Rakotondrabe was raised on the island of Réunion in a musically inclined family (he is René Lacaille’s great nephew). At the age of 11, he took up the piano. He acquired his diploma from the Regional Conservatory at the age of 17, simultaneously securing the 3rd Prize in the "Pian'Austral Jazz" competition—a regional piano competition featuring participants from Indian Ocean countries. Alain Jean-Marie presided as head of the jury for the competition.

In 2001, Gael Rakotondrabe enrolled in the Bill Evans Piano Academy in Paris, where he studied with Bernard Maury, the academy's founder.

In 2004, he graduated from both the Bill Evans Piano Academy and the jazz department of the Nadia and Lily Boulanger Conservatory.

Concurrently, he pursued studies in classical composition and harmony under Isabelle Duha at the Issy-les-Moulineaux Conservatory.

Rakotondrabe's musical pursuits encompassed various jazz formations, including a quintet dedicated to the tribute of Horace Silver, featuring David Sauzay and Fabien Mary. The quintet's won the Sunside Trophy in 2005.

Additionally, he established his own jazz trios and delivered solo performances.

In 2007, Gael received the opportunity to perform at Carnegie Hall in New York City as part of a carte blanche event hosted by David Byrne. He performed with artists such as Devendra Banhart, CocoRosie, Animal Collective, and Vashti Bunyan.

Gael Rakotondrabe assumed the roles of pianist and arranger for the group CocoRosie. This collaboration led to international tours from 2007 to 2011, including performances at Coachella in the United States, the Sydney Opera House, and the Olympia in Paris.

In 2008, Gael collaborated with Jules Buckley to arrange CocoRosie’s songs for a unique performance with the Royal Concertgebouw Symphonic Orchestra, conducted by Suzanna Mälki.

The same year, he won the first prize in the international piano competition at the Montreux Jazz Festival, with Fazil Say presiding as head of the jury and Quincy Jones as the honorary president. This achievement propelled him into the "Montreux Jazz Winner" tour, where he opened for Jamie Cullum and the CTI Jazz All-Star Band at the Miles Davis Hall in Montreux. In 2009, Gael collaborated with Sierra Casady, designer Gaspard Yurkievich, and set designer Nadia Lauro for the show Transhumance at the Centre Pompidou.

In 2011, he contributed as arranger, composer, and co-producer to CocoRosie's album Grey Oceans.

Subsequently, he undertook the role of musical director for Robert Wilson's opera, The Life and Death of Marina Abramović, featuring Anohni (Antony & the Johnsons), Matmos, Marina Abramović, and Willem Dafoe. Gael also participated in the theater production Edda alongside CocoRosie.

Simultaneously, Gael Rakotondrabe became a member of "Antony and The Johnsons" and started a worldwide tour featuring philharmonic orchestras in the cities they traveled to.

He was invited by Marina Abramović to partake in a performance with Anohni at the Guggenheim in New York City as part of her 70th birthday celebration.

Gael's involvement in the world of cinema extended to composing and contributing to the scores of feature films, including Afterschool (2008) directed by Antonio Campos, Mystery (2012) directed by Lou Ye, both of which competed in the official selection at the Cannes Film Festival, and Mr. Leos caraX (2014) by Tessa Louise-Salomé, presented at the Sundance Film Festival.

He also composed the score for the animated film University of Disaster (2017) by the painter Radenko Milak, featured at the Venice Biennale.

Rakotondrabe produced and recorded for artists such as Yasmine Hamdan (2012), CocoRosie (2007–2024), Dani Siciliano (2016), Mélanie Pain (2016), Thomas Roussel (2018), and Woodkid (2020).

In 2022, he undertook the composition of the score for Other People's Children (2022), nominated at the Venice Film Festival and Sundance.

In 2022, he composed the score of The Wild One (2022) by Tessa Louise-Salomé, which earned the Best Cinematography Award at the Tribeca Film Festival, and of On the Edge (2023) by Nicolas Peduzzi, presented in the ACID section at the Cannes Film Festival and receiving a special mention from the jury at CPH:DOX, as well as the Grand Jury Prize at the Champs-Élysées Film Festival. It is selected for the music of On the Edge at the International Music & Cinema Festival Marseille (2024).

In 2024, Gael Rakotondrabe joined ANOHNI (formerly Antony and the Johnsons) as a member of a nine-piece ensemble for a world tour. This series of concerts features songs from ANOHNI's new album My Back Was A Bridge For You To Cross, as well as other tracks from her repertoire. The ensemble includes Julia Kent (cello), Maxim Moston (violin), Mazz Swift (violin), Doug Wieselman (clarinet and saxophone), Samuel Dixon (bass), Jimmy Hogarth (guitar), Leo Abrahams (guitar), and Chris Vatalaro (drums). The tour began in the spring of 2024, covering Europe and North America before expanding to other regions in 2025.

In November 2024, Gael Rakotondrabe accompanied ANOHNI in a duo performance at the Hunter Center at MASS MoCA, marking the opening of Jeffrey Gibson's installation Power Full Because We're Different. This performance, centered on piano and voice, showcased a more minimalist and introspective aspect of their collaboration.

== Discography ==
=== Albums ===
2024 : Reckoner (MVKA)

2024 : On the Edge (Original Motion Picture Soundtrack)

2024 : Elevator Angels Cocorosie Featuring Gael Rakotondrabe

2024 : Shadow (Caramba Records/ Virgin - Universal)

2023 : The Wild One (Original Motion Picture Soundtrack)

2022 : Other People's Children co-composed with ROB – Robin Coudert (Original Motion Picture Soundtrack)

2021 : Mr. leos caraX (Original Motion Picture Soundtrack)

=== Collaborations ===
2024 : collaboration on the album Mami Wata by Ayo

2024 : collaboration on the album Good Grief by Hugh Coltman

2023 : collaboration on the album Never Let Me Go by Fabien Mary

2022 : collaboration on the album Ad Astra by Maud Geffray

2022 : collaboration on the album Bomboloni by Aurélie Saada

2022 : collaboration on the album Madeleines by Anne Sila

2021 : collaboration on the soundtrack of Rose by Aurélie Saada

2020 : collaboration on the album Royal by Ayo

2019 : collaboration on the album Sainte-Victoire by Clara Luciani

2018 : collaboration on the album Who's Happy by Hugh Coltman

2018 : collaboration on the album Si Vous Saviez... by Salvatore Adamo

2018 : collaboration on the album Ed Banger 15 Ans by l'Orchestre Lamoureux & Thomas Roussel

2016 : collaboration on the album Untouchable / Between The Bars by Hugh Coltman and Camelia Jordana

2016 : collaboration on the album Morituri by Jean-Louis Murat

2016 : collaboration on the album Why by Dani Siciliano

2016 : collaboration on the soundtrack by Imany for the film Sous les Jupes des Filles by Audrey Dana

2016 : collaboration on the album Shadows Songs Of Nat King Cole & Live at Jazz A Vienne by Hugh Coltman

2015 : collaboration on the album Soeur Nature by Bonnie Banane

2014 : collaboration on the album Paris Tristesse by Pierre Lapointe

2014 : collaboration on the album Morning Star by Hugh Coltman

2014 : collaboration on the album Sometimes Awake by Charles Pasi

2013 : album Tales of a GrassWidow by CocoRosie

2013 : collaboration on the album Ya Nass by Yasmine Hamdan

2011 : collaboration on the album Bécaud, Et Maintenant

2010 : collaboration on the album Une vie Saint Laurent by Alain Chamfort

2010 : album Grey Ocean by CocoRosie

2008 : collaboration on the album Stories From The Safe House by Hugh Coltman

2007 : collaboration on the album Affaire Classée by Hubert Mounier

2007 : album The Adventures of Ghosthorse & Stillborn by CocoRosie

2006 : collaboration on the album She was a girl by Spleen
