= Coconuts, Plenty of Junk Food =

EP by CocoRosie
- Released: June 3, 2009
- Genre: Electronica, experimental, freak folk, folktronica
- Length: 16:29
- Label: Touch and Go Records (self-released)

CocoRosie chronology
God Has a Voice, She Speaks Through Me (2008)	Coconuts, Plenty of Junk Food (2009)	Grey Oceans (2010)

Coconuts, Plenty of Junk Food is an EP by American musical group CocoRosie, released on June 3, 2009. The EP was self-released and only available to be bought at CocoRosie's 2009 Summer Tour. It has been described as art pop, electronica, experimental, rock, folk rock, folktronica, freak folk, hip hop, and indie.

On March 11, 2013, a Tumblr fanblog "CocoRosie Land" posted an image of an "album biography" written by one of the Casady sisters, detailing the concept and aesthetic of the EP. As of July 2020, the full EP can be downloaded on the Touch and Go Records website.

== Reception ==
The EP received generally mixed reviews. Music websites Sputnikmusic, Rate Your Music, and Album of The Year gave it an average rating of 3.3 out of 5, 2.77 out of 5, and 64 out of 100, respectively.

Music webzine What's On The Hi-Fi reviewed the EP shortly after its release, describing the opening track "Happy Eyez" as "a child's dream pop song with a carousel organ and double-dutch jump rope beat", the track "Coconuts" as "a Kid Loco-esque drum beat below a toy piano and regular piano and an off time harmony", and the track "Milkman" as "a very grown up blues/jazz lament that features Bianca's best vocals over a cool, laconic jazz piano best compared to Leon Russell’s pared down offerings." A review in a June 2009 issue of JH Weekly newspaper gave the album 4 out of 5 stars, describing it as "accessible, but equally lullaby-like" and noting the "buttery, child-like voices over what seem to be horn loops, organs, strings". The blog Wired for Music described the EP as "no exception" to "CocoRosie... making songs that sound like someone glued together pieces of other unrelated songs and then got Joanna Newsom drunk and asked her to sing over top of it."

== Track listing ==
No.	Title	Length
1.	"Happy Eyez"	3:23
2.	"Coconuts"	2:56
3.	"Milkman"	3:44
4.	"Joseph City"	3:46
5.	"Spirit Lake"	2:34
