= Jack Garfein =

American director (1930–2019)

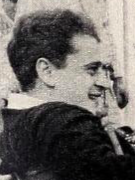
- Garfein in 1957
- Born: Jakob Garfein; July 2, 1930; Mukacevo, Czechoslovakia (now Mukachevo, Ukraine)
- Died: December 30, 2019 (aged 89); Manhattan, NY
- Occupations: Director, teacher, writer, producer
- Spouses: Carroll Baker (m. 1955–69); Anna Loretta (m. 2003–07); Natalia Repolovsky (m. 2019)
- Children: 4, including Blanche Baker and Herschel Garfein

Jakob Garfein (July 2, 1930 – December 30, 2019) was an American film and theatre director, acting teacher, and a key figure of the Actors Studio.

Growing up in Bardejov, Czechoslovakia during the rise of Nazism, Garfein was deported to Auschwitz at the age of 13 and survived 11 concentration camps. In 1946, as an orphaned teen, he was among an early group of Holocaust survivors to arrive in the U.S., and he obtained his American citizenship in 1952.

After studying at the Dramatic Workshop in New York, Garfein became the first theater director to be awarded membership in the Actors Studio. He put on its first-ever play to move to Broadway, End as a Man (1953), and expanded the influence of Method Acting to Hollywood with the founding of Actors Studio West, alongside Paul Newman, in 1966. He was a teacher to actors Sissy Spacek, Ron Perlman, Irène Jacob, James Thierrée, Laetitia Casta, and Samuel Le Bihan. He directed Uta Hagen, Herbert Berghof, Shelley Winters, Jessica Tandy, Hume Cronyn, Ralph Meeker, Mark Richman, Mildred Dunnock, and Elaine Stritch, and discovered Steve McQueen, Bruce Dern, George Peppard, Ben Gazzara, Pat Hingle, Albert Salmi, and Paul Richards. He also gave James Dean his first acting role in End as a Man (1953).

Working in Hollywood, Garfein collaborated with directors Elia Kazan and George Stevens on the sets of Baby Doll (1956) and Giant (1956). Shortly after, he authored two both politically and artistically challenging films that did not spare Hollywood's conservatism and led to censorship. In The Strange One (1957), he tackled the question of racism in America. As a Jew who survived the Holocaust, he was shocked by segregation upon his arrival in the United States, and he fought for the right for African-American actors to be featured in the film. The Strange One was censored by the Motion Picture Production Code for general "homosexual overtones" and "excessive brutality and suggestive sequences [that] tend to arouse disrespect for lawful authority."

== Early life ==
Born to a Jewish family in Mukachevo, Garfein grew up in the shtetl of Bardejov, Czechoslovakia (now Slovakia). His mother, Blanka (Spiegel), was a homemaker, and his father, Hermann Garfein, an executive at the family's sawmill. During the rise of Nazism, Garfein's father organized a resistance movement in their town, but in 1942, was caught trying to flee to Palestine and deported to Auschwitz. In 1943, Garfein was smuggled to Hungary with his mother and younger sister, Hadi, where they hid with relatives until their deportation to Auschwitz in 1944. His entire family was killed during the Holocaust. He survived 11 concentration camps.

At the end of the war, he was liberated by the British Army in the Bergen-Belsen camp. Weighing just 48 pounds, he was sent to an orphanage in Malmö, Sweden where he was rehabilitated by a nun named Hedvig Ekberg. Calling her his "second mother," Garfein visited her nearly 16 years later during a promotional tour of his film Something Wild(1961) in Sweden.

In 1946, an American Embassy official visiting the orphanage offered Garfein the chance to immigrate to the U.S., where he joined his uncle living in New York. He was then taken care of by the Jewish Child Care Association, which helped him secure a scholarship in 1947 to study at the Dramatic Workshop at The New School for Social Research.

Garfein took classes in acting with the influential German director Erwin Piscator. Among his classmates were Walter Matthau, Tony Curtis and Rod Steiger. During those years, he created a theater troupe, The New Horizon Players, with whom he learned the art of directing and acting. In 1948, Piscator cast him as the lead in his production of "The Burning Bush," the story of a young boy from an Orthodox Jewish family accused of committing blood libel by the antisemitic members of the Hungarian aristocracy. In the following years, some of his early jobs as theater director included productions such as Arthur Laurents' Home of the Brave (1950) and Oscar Wilde's Birthday of the Infanta (1949), in which he had the lead role.

Encouraged by Piscator and Lee Strasberg, Garfein joined the American Theatre Wing to study directing with Strasberg. After graduating at the age of 20, he was hired by NBC to direct 15-minute dramatic segments on television for The Kate Smith Hour with Barry Nelson, Phyllis Love, and Donald Buka, who were exciting new actors on Broadway at the time.

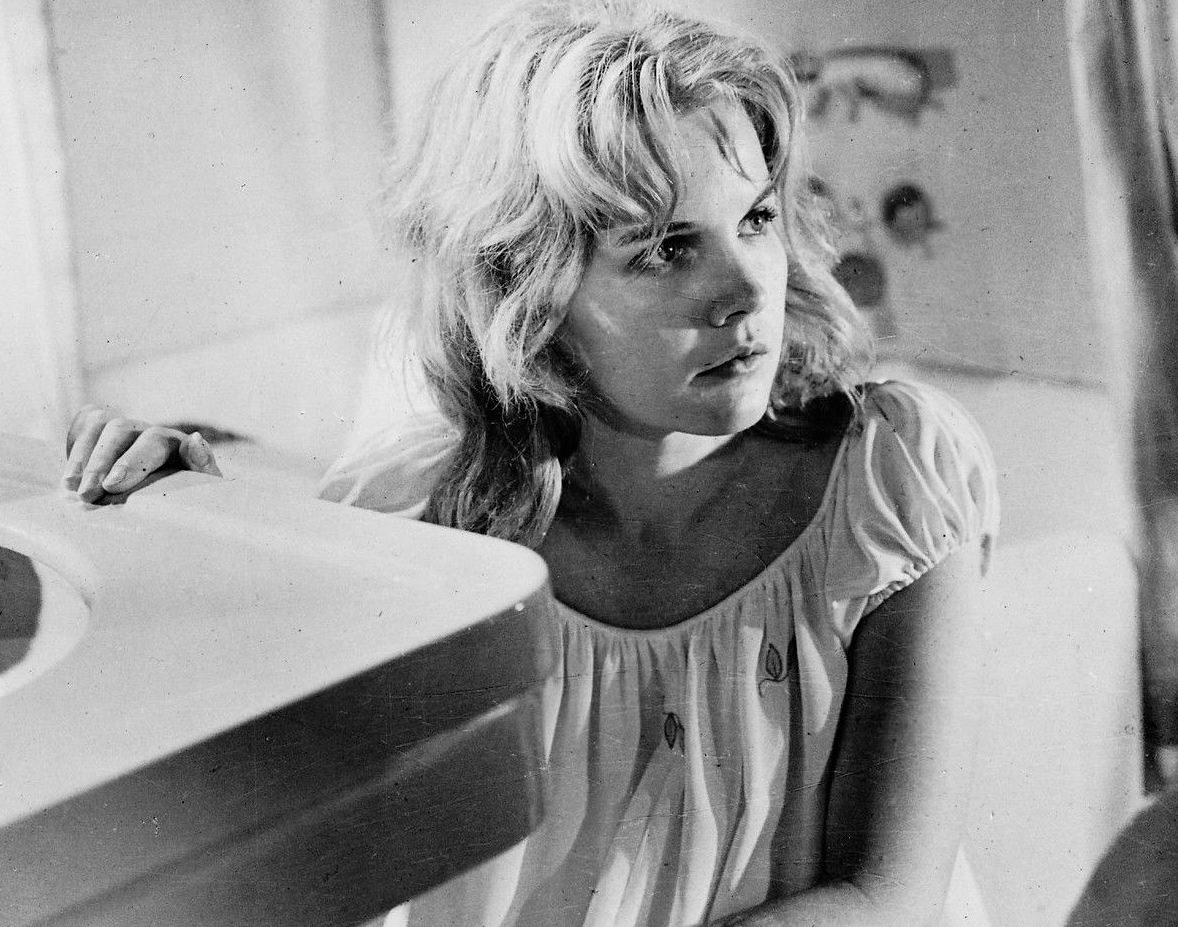
Carroll Baker in Garfein's Something Wild (1961)

== Early works ==
Impressed by Garfein's stage production of Alexandre Dumas's Camille (La Dame aux Camélias), Strasberg invited him to attend the Actors Studio for a year. During this time, he directed and produced the Actors Studio's first full-length play, End as a Man (1953), based on a novel by Calder Willingham. Until then, the Studio had served primarily as an actors' workshop for developing individual scenes.

Praised by Strasberg and Kazan, End as a Man opened at the Théâtre de Lys, becoming the first Actors Studio production to open off-Broadway. The critical acclaim was so astonishing that the play then moved to Broadway, the first such transfer since one of O'Neill's plays a quarter of a century earlier. The play revealed Ben Gazzara as an up-and-coming actor, and at the age of 23, Garfein won the Show Business Award as the best director on Broadway.

In June 1955, Garfein received a letter informing him he had been invited by the board of directors to become a member of the Actors Studio. It was there that he met Carroll Baker, who was his fellow student and whom he married.

Baker and Garfein had one daughter, Emmy Award-winning actress Blanche Baker, and a son, Grammy-Award-winning composer Herschel Garfein.

== Career as a producer and theatre director ==
Following End as a Man, Garfein helmed three more plays on Broadway: Richard Nash's Girls of Summer(1956), starring Shelley Winters, John McLiam's The Sin of Pat Muldoon (1957), and Sean O'Casey's The Shadow of a Gunman (1958), starring a young Bruce Dern in a breakthrough role.

Garfein's numerous off-Broadway credits include Eugene O'Neill's Anna Christie (1966), Eugène Ionesco's California Reich and The Lesson (1978–79), Arthur Miller'sThe Price and The American Clock (1979-1980), Anton Chekhov's Sketchbook with Joseph Bulof and John Herd (1981), Alan Schneider's Catastrophe (1983), Samuel Beckett's Ohio Impromptu, Catastrophe, What Where, and Endgame (1983–84), Nathalie Saurraute's For No Good Reason (1985) and Childhood (1985), starring Glenn Close, A Kurt Weill Cabaret with Alvin Epstein and Marta Schlamme (1985), Gastón Salvatore's Stalin (1989), Ekkehard Schall's plays for the Brecht Theater, and South African playwright Athol Fugard's Master Harold (1985), which premiered in France at the Théâtre du Rond-Point. Following the premiere, French actor and director Jean-Louis Barrault arranged for Garfein to teach an acting class at the theater.

Garfein was the founder and artistic director of the Samuel Beckett Theater (1974) in New York City, as well as the Harold Clurman Theatre (1978) on Theatre Row. Maintaining a lifelong friendship and correspondence with Garfein, Beckett gave him the world premiere stage rights to his popular television play Nacht und Träume (Night and Dreams, 1982).

In 2013, Garfein adapted and directed Franz Kafka's "A Report to the Academy" at the Théâtre des Mathurins in Paris.

== Career as a film director ==
Adapted from his theatre production of End as a Man (1953), Garfein's film directorial debut, The Strange One (1957), is an ensemble piece set in a sadistic Southern military academy. As noted by critic Foster Hirsch, the film bears disturbing echoes of the Nazi fascism Garfein witnessed firsthand, with its focus on a cruel yet charismatic cadet, Jocko de Paris, who coerces his peers into covering up a vicious hazing incident at the school. The Strange One was at the center of controversies around race in Hollywood and was released without the original ending, which included scenes involving black actors. In racially segregated America of 1957, the studio objected on the grounds that to use black actors would mean commercial failure by causing the film to lose distribution in the South. Garfein refused to bow down and filmed the scene anyway.

Garfein's second movie, Something Wild (1961), adapted from Alex Karmel's novel Mary Ann (1958) and independently produced by Garfein through his company Prometheus Enterprises, was controversial. In the film, his then-wife Carroll Baker plays as a young rape victim held captive by the man (Ralph Meeker) who rescues her from suicide. Their ambiguous relationship as one of both refuge and abuse for Mary Ann was met with rejection by critics and audiences alike in the U.S. In his 1963 interview with Albert Johnson of Film Quarterly, Garfein noted how Something Wild had not played in three-fourths of the major cities in the United States, including Chicago, and that he had not been offered another film project since its release.

Something Wild, however, did have a more positive reception in Europe. As Garfein recalls in his interview with Johnson, "I've found that only people from abroad, like François Truffaut or Marcel Marceau, were really interested in my two films, The Strange One, called End as a Man overseas, and my most recent film Something Wild." The famous Italian critic Albert Moravia remarked upon the film's significance, and Garfein further recalls how during the film's promotional tour in Sweden, he had come upon one headline that read: "Is Jack Garfein the American Ingmar Bergman?" As Joshua Brunsting of CriterionCast writes, "Garnering great support in Europe, many have compared Garfein's film to the works of Ingmar Bergman, and that's about as perfect a comparison as one could make. The photographic comparisons are clear, as is the battle with guilt, shame and most clearly trauma. It's a wonderfully moving motion picture, and Garfein's direction is one major reason why."

== Television career ==
In 1951, Garfein was offered his first job in television, directing short dramatic sketches for The Kate Smith Hour. His direction of the short teleplay Rooftop was described by Ben Gross of the New York Daily News as "an exceptionally good dramatic interlude" and "one of the most moving dramatic vignettes seen on TV in a long time; a simple story of love among the tenements, combining realism with a touch of poesy." Gross further praised the "vividness and economy" of Garfein's direction.

Several years later, Garfein directed an episode of the first prime time network color television series The Marriage, which aired on NBC from July to August 1954. The series starred real-life couple Jessica Tandy and Hume Cronyn. The Washington Post called it among the best of the summertime replacement series, praising its "adult approach to situation comedy," with believable situations and intelligent characters.

One of a select group of non-performers awarded membership in The Actors Studio, Garfein became director of the Studio's Los Angeles branch founded in 1966, and created The Harold Clurman Theatre on Theatre Row in New York City. Instructing for more than 40 years, he was one of the most experienced teachers of Method Acting. Garfein offered acting and directing classes in Paris at Le Studio Jack Garfein, London, Budapest, New York, and Los Angeles. He has written Life and Acting - Techniques for the Actor.

== Teaching career ==
One of a select group of non-performers awarded membership in The Actors Studio, Garfein became director of the Studio's Los Angeles branch, which he had co-founded with Paul Newman in 1966. He opened the Actors and Directors Lab in New York in 1974, a drama school where several well-known figures studied, including Sissy Spacek, Paul Schrader, Tom Schulman, and Phil Alden Robinson. Over the years, Garfein offered acting and directing classes in London, Budapest, and at Le Studio Jack Garfein in Paris.

Instructing for more than 40 years, Garfein wrote a book based on his experience, titled Life and Acting - Techniques for the Actor (2010). In July 2012, Garfein was awarded the Masque d'Or and voted best acting teacher in France.

== Personal life ==
Throughout his life, Garfein knew and worked with some of the preeminent artists of his time. Henry Miller praised Garfein's talent in his book My Bike and Other Friends (1977). He was a close friend of Marilyn Monroe, Samuel Beckett, Arthur Miller, Elia Kazan, and Lee Strasberg, whom Garfein considered as a kind of adoptive father because he had lived with the Strasbergs during his early years studying theater in the U.S.

Garfein died in 2019 in a hospital in Manhattan , due to complications from leukemia.

In 1984, The Cinémathèque Française paid tribute to Garfein's work by screening his two films, The Strange One and Something Wild, presented by Costa Gavras for the occasion. These initial screenings were followed that same year by a second retrospective at the Filmoteca Española in Madrid.

In 2010, a tribute to Garfein was presented in Los Angeles by the UCLA Film and Television Archive at the Hammer Museum's Billy Wilder Theater, which featured screenings of his two films, as well as Brian McKenna's documentary A Journey Back (1987), which chronicles Garfein as he revisits Auschwitz and returns to his childhood home.

Similar events were held in 2011 at the Film Forum in New York City, hosted by film and Actors Studio historian Foster Hirch, and in 2014 at the BFI in London, hosted by Clyde Jeavons as part of the BFI's "Birth of the Method" screening series.

Other retrospectives of Garfein's works have been organized at the Forum des Images in Paris (2008), the Festival Lumière in Lyon (2009), the Telluride Film Festival (2012), and in 2013 at the Cinémathèques in Tel-Aviv, Jerusalem, and Haifa.

In 2022, The Wild One, a documentary retracing Garfein's life and legacy, premiered at the Tribeca Film Festival where it won the Award for Best Cinematography, and was selected at the Denver International Film Festival, and at the Palm Beach International Film Festival in Florida. The film, directed by Tessa Louise-Salomé and narrated by Willem Dafoe, features unreleased interviews of Jack Garfein, Foster Hirsch or Peter Bogdanovic shot for the film. In May 2023, The Wild One (2023) was released in French Theatres.
