= Rainbow Tribe =

Rainbow Tribe may refer to:

- Josephine Baker's chosen family and intentional community, the Rainbow Tribe
- The Legend of the Rainbow Warriors, a belief held by some modern environmentalists that they are fulfilling a Native American prophecy
- Rainbow Family, a counter-culture hippie group, best known for their camping festival, the
  - Rainbow Gathering
- Rainbow nation, Desmond Tutu's term for post-apartheid South Africa
