= Heartache City =

Studio album by CocoRosie
- Released: September 18, 2015
- Genre: Freak folk
- Length: 44:32
- Label: Lost Girl Records
- Producer: CocoRosie

CocoRosie chronology
| Tales of a GrassWidow (2013) | Heartache City (2015) | Put the Shine On (2020) |

Alternative cover
- Vinyl edition cover

Heartache City is the sixth studio album by American musical group CocoRosie. It was released by CocoRosie's own record label, Lost Girl Records, on September 18, 2015. The album is described by music webzine The Line of Best Fit as a freak folk album in which "the tracks all share a strong backbone of hip hop and afro-beat".

== Background ==
Like many of our past records, we wrote and gathered much of the material at our farm studio in the south of France with minimal equipment, vintage toys and antique instruments. Going back to a "4-track" style approach, we limited ourselves to essential, acoustic accompaniment, played by us, and select percussion, toys from our old suit cases dating back to the La Maison days.

— CocoRosie

== Promotion and release ==
On June 11, 2015, CocoRosie shared a behind-the-scenes video of the group in the studio and announced that a new album would be released that Fall. The video featured snippets of the tracks "Hairnet Paradise" and "Big and Black", the latter being intended for the album. The album was preceded by the release of three live recordings of album tracks: "Heartache City" on July 9, 2015; "Un Beso" on July 22, 2015; and "Lost Girls" on August 11, 2015. The live tracks were recorded at Findspire Studio and released on SoundCloud. The album's title and release date were revealed along with the release of "Un Beso (Live)" on July 22, 2015. On September 10, 2015, the track "Tim and Tina" premiered exclusively through Billboard.

Heartache City was released digitally on September 18, 2015 and on CD on October 16, 2015. It is the first album to be released on CocoRosie's own label, Lost Girl Records. The non-album track "Lilies of Innocence" which features guest vocals from frequent collaborator Anohni was available to download upon ordering the album on CD from CocoRosie's website. On January 29, 2016, the album was released on vinyl. The vinyl release has different album art and includes two bonus tracks: "Lilies of Innocence" and "Un Beso (Live)".

== Critical reception ==
Professional ratings
Aggregate scores
| Source | Rating |
|---|---|
| Metacritic | 66/100 |
Review scores
| Source | Rating |
| AllMusic | 3.5/5 stars |
| The Independent | 3/5 stars |
| The Line of Best Fit | 8/10 |
| PopMatters | 7/10 stars |
| The Skinny | 2/5 stars |

At Metacritic, which assigns a weighted average score out of 100 to reviews from mainstream critics, the album received an average score of 66, based on 7 reviews, indicating "generally favorable reviews".

== Track listing ==
All tracks are written by CocoRosie.

| No. | Title | Length |
|---|---|---|
| 1. | "Forget Me Not" | 5:30 |
| 2. | "Un Beso" | 4:18 |
| 3. | "Lost Girls" | 5:20 |
| 4. | "Heartache City" | 3:14 |
| 5. | "The Tower of Pisa" | 3:20 |
| 6. | "Bed Bugs" | 3:46 |
| 7. | "Tim and Tina" | 4:14 |
| 8. | "Big and Black" | 5:54 |
| 9. | "Lucky Clover" | 5:24 |
| 10. | "No One Knows" | 3:30 |
| Total length: | | 44:32 |

Vinyl edition bonus tracks
| No. | Title | Length |
|---|---|---|
| 11. | "Lilies of Innocence" (featuring Anohni) | 4:23 |
| 12. | "Un Beso" (live) | 5:04 |
| Total length: | | 53:59 |

== Personnel ==
Credits adapted from liner notes.

- CocoRosie – performance, production
- Tez – human beatbox (4), production (4)
- Takuya Nakamura – keyboards (4, 8), trumpet (4, 8)
- Tavahn Ghazi – vocals (6)
- Nicolas Kalwill – engineering, mixing

== Charts ==
| Chart | Peak position |
|---|---|
| Belgian Albums (Ultratop Flanders) | 174 |
| Belgian Albums (Ultratop Wallonia) | 167 |
| French Albums (SNEP) | 193 |
