= Thunderhorse =

Thunderhorse or Thunder horse may refer to:

- Thunder Horse PDQ, a semi-submersible oil rig in the Gulf of Mexico
- Thunder Horse Oil Field, a gas and oil field in the Gulf of Mexico
- "Thunderhorse", a song on the Dethklok album The Dethalbum
- Iron Thunderhorse, a Native American leader
- Thunder (mascot), the horse mascot for the Denver Broncos
