= Beautiful Boy =

Beautiful Boy may refer to:

== Music ==
- "Beautiful Boy (Darling Boy)", a 1980 song by John Lennon from Double Fantasy
- "Beautiful Boys", a 1980 song by Yoko Ono, also from Double Fantasy
- "Beautiful Boy", a song by Kelli Ali from Tigermouth
- "Beautiful Boy", a song by Nate Borofsky from Never Enough Time
- "Beautiful Boy", a song by Karol G from KG0516
- "Beautiful Boy", a song from the 2005 musical Lestat
- "Beautiful Boy", a song by The Last Dinner Party from Prelude to Ecstasy

== Other media ==
- Beautiful Boy (2010 film), a 2010 drama directed by Shawn Ku
- Beautiful Boy (2018 film), a 2018 film directed by Felix van Groeningen
- The Beautiful Boy (or The Boy), a 2003 book by Germaine Greer
- Beautiful Boy: A Father's Journey Through His Son's Addiction, a 2008 book by David Sheff

== See also ==
- Beautiful Boyz, a 2004 EP by CocoRosie
- Bishōnen (lit. "beautiful boy"), a Japanese term for an aesthetic of male sexual appeal
- Vackra pojke! (Beautiful Boy!), a 1981 album by Pink Champagne
