= End as a Man =

End as a Man may refer to:

- The 1947 novel End as a Man by Calder Willingham
- The 1957 film End as a Man based on that novel and better known as The Strange One
