= Golden Mask =

Golden Mask may refer to:

== Awards ==
- Golden Mask (Russian award), a Russian theatre festival and award
- Guldmasken (in English: The Golden Mask), a Swedish theatre award
- Masque d'Or, a French prize for amateur productions awarded every four years by the Fédération Nationale des Compagnies de Théâtre amateur et d’Animation

== Film and TV ==
- The Golden Mask (1939 film), a German drama film directed by Hans H. Zerlett
- Złota Maska, a 1939 Polish film, the title is translated as Golden Mask
- South of Algiers (U.S. title The Golden Mask), a 1953 British adventure film

== See also ==
- Máscara Dorada
