= Put the Shine On =

Studio album by CocoRosie
- Released: March 13, 2020
- Length: 54:32
- Label: Marathon Artists

CocoRosie chronology
| Heartache City (2015) | Put the Shine On (2020) | Little Death Wishes (2025) |

Professional ratings
Aggregate scores
| Source | Rating |
|---|---|
| Metacritic | 58/100 |
Review scores
| Source | Rating |
| AllMusic | 3/5 stars |
| MusicOMH | 4/5 stars |
| The Observer | 3/5 stars |
| Pitchfork | 5.1/10 |

Put the Shine On is the seventh studio album by American musical group CocoRosie, released by Marathon Artists on March 13, 2020.

== Recording ==
Put the Shine On was recorded primarily in San Francisco, California. Early performances were tested at their brother Nathan's ranch on the Big Island of Hawaii, where the sisters spend much of their time writing. The songs "Aloha Friday" and "Lamb and the Wolf" were both inspired by watching lambs on the ranch, including an episode where their brother had to kill an injured lamb.

The album's sound has notable hip hop influence, as the Casady sisters had worked with rapper Chance the Rapper on his album The Big Day prior. The sisters worked on the album between visits to their mother, Christina Chalmers, who died eleven days after providing backing vocals for the track “Ruby Red".

== Critical reception ==
Put the Shine On received mixed reviews. Sasha Geffen of Pitchfork gave the album a rating of 5.1 out of 10, describing it as an "incoherent melange" and "a return to their maximalist tendencies, piling on drum machines, chintzy synthesizers, over-the-top raps, and nu-metal guitars". The review stated that the album's "complicated tone... gets blunted in the record's production," and notes the use of "stock hip-hop beats", "clumsy synth bass", "rhythmic elements", "fuzz bass", "distorted power chords", "harp loops", and lyrical content involving concepts like "generational trauma, mental illness, and sexual violence".

At Metacritic, which assigns a weighted average rating out of 100 to reviews from mainstream publications, this release received an average score of 58, based on 5 reviews.

The album was criticized by Cracked magazine for "tone-deaf levels of African American cultural appropriation." The song "Hell's Gate" incorporates elements from traditional slave songs, which the magazine called a "bewildering" choice.

== Track listing ==
Put the Shine On track listing
| No. | Title | Length |
|---|---|---|
| 1. | "High Road" | 4:06 |
| 2. | "Mercy" | 4:00 |
| 3. | "Restless" | 5:48 |
| 4. | "Smash My Head" | 4:26 |
| 5. | "Where Did All the Soldiers Go" | 4:44 |
| 6. | "Hell's Gate" | 5:18 |
| 7. | "Did Me Wrong" | 3:40 |
| 8. | "Lamb and the Wolf" | 4:32 |
| 9. | "Slow Down Sun Down" | 4:30 |
| 10. | "Burning Down The House" | 4:38 |
| 11. | "Ruby Red" | 4:30 |
| 12. | "Aloha Friday" | 4:20 |
| Total length: | | 54:32 |

== Charts ==
Chart performance for Put the Shine On
| Chart (2020 | Peak position |
|---|---|
| German Albums (Offizielle Top 100) | 76 |
| UK Independent Albums (OCC) | 44 |
