= Beautiful Boyz =

EP (Promo) by CocoRosie
- Released: September 14, 2004
- Genres: Folktronica, freak folk, indie
- Length: 11:37
- Label: Touch and Go Records

CocoRosie chronology
La Maison de Mon Rêve (2004)	Beautiful Boyz (2004)	Noah's Ark (2005)

Beautiful Boyz is an EP by American musical group CocoRosie, released by Touch and Go Records on September 14, 2004. The EP is only available as a digital download, though physical CD promotional media for the EP exists. The EP has been described as alternative, art pop, folktronica, freak folk, indie, and lo-fi indie.

The first two tracks on the EP are the same as their namesakes on CocoRosie's debut album La Maison de Mon Rêve, though the eponymous track "Beautiful Boyz" differs from the Noah's Ark version, which features British singer Anohni. The track "Beautiful Boyz" is an homage to French novelist, playwright, and poet Jean Genet.

== Reception ==
Beautiful Boyz received favorable reviews. Google Play gave the EP an average rating of 4.7 stars out of 5 stars. Music website Rate Your Music ranked the EP the 210th best work of 2004 and gave it an average rating of 3.61 out of 5.

== Track listing ==
No.	Title	Length
1.	"By Your Side"	3:59
2.	"Terrible Angels"	4:11
3.	"Beautiful Boyz"	3:27
