= CocoRosie =

American musical group

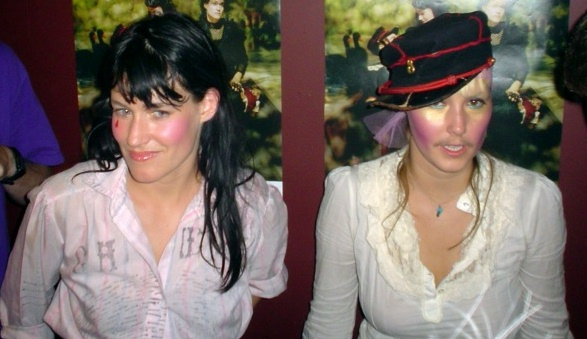
- Sierra (left) and Bianca Casady (right) in 2007

Background information
- Origin: United States
- Genres: Folktronica; freak folk; New Weird America; indie pop; hip hop
- Years active: 2003–present
- Labels: Touch and Go Records; Sub Pop; Marathon Artists; Lost Girl Records; City Slang
- Members: Sierra Rose Casady, Bianca Leilani Casady, Gael Rakotondrabe (former)
- Website: www.cocorosiemusic.com

CocoRosie is an American musical group formed in 2003 by sisters Sierra Rose "Rosie" and Bianca Leilani "Coco" Casady. The group's music has been described as folktronica, freak folk and "New Weird America", and incorporates elements of pop, blues, opera, electronica, and hip hop. The group has released eight studio albums, La Maison de Mon Rêve (2004), Noah's Ark (2005), The Adventures of Ghosthorse and Stillborn (2007), Grey Oceans (2010), Tales of a GrassWidow (2013), Heartache City (2015), Put the Shine On (2020) and Little Death Wishes (2025), and two EPs, Beautiful Boyz (2004) and Coconuts, Plenty of Junk Food (2009). They released their sixth album Heartache City on their own record label, Lost Girl Records.

Originally a duo, the group was formed when Bianca, who was living in New York City at the time, made an impromptu visit to Sierra at her apartment in Paris, France, reconnecting with her for the first time in ten years. The sisters began creating music together, singing over instrumentals produced using a combination of traditional instruments and found objects, most notably children's toys. They later expanded to a group and added various backing musicians, including a bassist, keyboardist, beatboxer, and synth player.

CocoRosie has performed and toured in North America, South America, and at many prominent European venues and festivals such as the Olympia, the Grand Rex, the Royal Concertgebouw, Pukkelpop, and Lowlands Festival. In 2009, music magazine Better Propaganda named CocoRosie the 16th most influential artist of the 2000s.

== Early life ==
Sierra Casady was born on June 9, 1980, in Fort Dodge, Iowa, and Bianca Casady on March 27, 1982, in Hilo, Hawaii. Their parents divorced when Sierra was four and Bianca was two and the sisters, who identify as "part Native American", stayed with their late mother, Christina Chalmers (née Hunter), Iowan artist, singer, Steiner/Waldorf teacher, and "healer" of Syrian Orthodox ancestry, who "compulsively moved" and "kept throwing away everything the family owned and starting all over again". Chalmers was born in Madison, West Virginia. Chalmers nicknamed Sierra "Rosie" and Bianca "Coco", from which CocoRosie takes its name. Their mother's partner was the New Age spiritual leader Brooke Medicine Eagle, whom Bianca has said "carried [her] in a papoose around sacred Anasazi grounds" as a child. The Casady sisters have said that their maternal grandfather, whom they have never met, was Cherokee and that their mother believed her nomadic tendencies were because "her Syrian ancestors must have had a lot of Gypsy in them". Bianca has discussed her mother's ethnic background by saying: "Nowadays, who would want to be white? But back then, in farm country, anything other than button-nosed blonde didn't fly."

Their childhood has been described as "bizarre" and "nomadic". They moved almost yearly, living in Hawaii, Arizona, California and New Mexico, and frequently changed schools. Because their mother believed they would learn more "in the real world" than in school, neither sister finished high school. The sisters were somewhat estranged from their father, Timothy Casady, an organic farmer, teacher, and spiritualist who came from an Iowa farming family, and who was interested in New Age experiences inspired by Native American religions, neoshamanism, and "the Peyote Church, which involves ingesting the hallucinogenic cactus peyote." The sisters spent some childhood summers with him, where they experienced him "dragging us on vision quests ... as a little kid, sometimes it's a nightmare, you're out in the desert, you don't have any food". In 1994, at 14, Sierra was kicked out of the home by Chalmers and went to live with her father in Sedona, where she began attending private boarding school Verde Valley School and lost contact with Bianca. Bianca also attended Verde Valley School.

In a 2004 interview, Bianca described their childhood, stating: "we spent our summers hiking from reservation to reservation... I remember being in peyote circles as a kid, sitting in tepees full of smoke... not being able to breathe and trying to sneak air out of the bottom of the tepee... We always felt pretty much like freaks, but we felt good about it. We didn't have any rules or anything. We had total freedom. It was hard to meet people who had the same values as us. We just sort of carry that with us today. We have pow-wows in our apartment, with bottles of cheap beer. It has to manifest itself somehow."

=== Musical influence ===
The sisters generally disliked their experiences when they were children, but came to appreciate aspects that would later influence their music. Later, in a 2015 interview with PopMatters discussing their sixth album, Heartache City, Bianca stated that she felt she did not have "certain rights" as a child, and that she and Sierra "didn't really have the space to be children". She explained that in their music they "explore... expressing from a child's point of view... because a child sees what's going on around them but doesn't really judge, and tends to reflect back certain ugliness and then they also don't have shame necessarily, or certain social restrictions on the way that they talk." In a 2007 interview, discussing the track lyrics of The Adventures of Ghosthorse and Stillborn, Bianca briefly mentioned that as a child she "would burn ants and hunt rabbits" with Sierra, and that on the album there is "talk about family members and our experiences... It's not about what we have been doing, more major experiences, like moments from our childhood."

In a 2007 interview, Sierra stated that the track "Rainbowarriors" from their third album, The Adventures of Ghosthorse and Stillborn, is "based on personal experiences and the Native American idea of the rainbow trail, but our own interpretation of that," and, in another 2007 interview, said that she and Bianca refer to themselves as "rainbowarriors". The Legend of the Rainbow Warriors is considered New Age pseudo-folklore and the Casady sisters have been criticized for "race-baiting" and "naïve and insensitive appropriation of Native American mythology" due to their use of Native American themes in their works.

The Casady sisters' mother, Christina Chalmers, died in January 2017 during the production of CocoRosie's seventh album, Put the Shine On, eleven days after providing backing vocals for the track "Ruby Red", which is about her life.

== Career ==
=== 2003−2004: Formation and La Maison de Mon Rêve ===
Sierra has received classical opera training in Rome, Paris, and New York City. At age 17, she moved to Rome to be privately tutored by Rosana Staffi. In 2000, after having lived in New York City for two years while studying at the Manhattan School of Music and the Mannes School of Music, Sierra moved into a "tiny" apartment in the Montmartre district of Paris, France to study at the Conservatoire de Paris, pursuing a career as an opera singer. Casady cheated to gain entrance to the Conservatoire, stating "I pretended I could sight-read when I couldn't." She also studied at the Conservatoire Rachmaninoff in Paris. During this period she had no contact with Bianca, who by 2002 was living in Brooklyn and studying linguistics, sociology, and visual arts. Bianca had been "really involved in the literary community" in New York, claiming she "had a small press, was making books and hosting book clubs and curating shows" in her home. According to a 2007 Clash interview, the sisters had "hardly spoke a word to each other for ten years" at that point, with Bianca saying they "had seen each other a few times, but... abstained from speaking to each other. It was less of children being split up and more of us choosing not to connect."

In early 2003, Bianca made an impromptu visit to Paris to rejoin Sierra, and the two spent months creating music in Sierra's bathroom which, according to them, was the most isolated room in the apartment and had the best acoustics. The sisters took a lo-fi and experimental approach to production, utilizing a distinct vocal style, traditional instruments, and various improvised instruments such as toys, all recorded with one microphone and a "broken" pair of headphones. In a 2009 interview, Bianca stated that the decision to make music was also impromptu, and that after reuniting they had been "doing a lot of photography and started to just sort of document our daily adventures... recording was just sort of a natural progression of that... at no point were we, you know, aware of the goal of making a record... we intuitively really kind of stuck to that format without knowing it, like by making twelve songs and kind of thinking of it as that structure." The individual tracks created in the process were compiled into an album which would later be released as CocoRosie's debut, La Maison de Mon Rêve.

The sisters have said they only wanted a few copies of the album to be produced, planning to give the copies to friends. However, the CocoRosie act was signed to the independent record label Touch and Go Records in 2004, after the label allegedly "pursued them" and persuaded them to, and the album was released on March 9, 2004, to unexpected critical acclaim.

=== 2005−2006: Beautiful Boyz and Noah's Ark ===
CocoRosie released their second album, Noah's Ark, in 2005. The album includes collaborations with Anohni from Antony and the Johnsons ("Beautiful Boyz"), Devendra Banhart ("Brazilian Sun"), and French rapper Spleen ("Bisounours"). The album was recorded in a variety of locations as the sisters traveled. The album's cover, a drawing by Bianca of three unicorns having sex while one of them vomits drops corresponding to the color spectrum, was selected by The Guardian and Pitchfork Media as one of the worst album covers of all time.

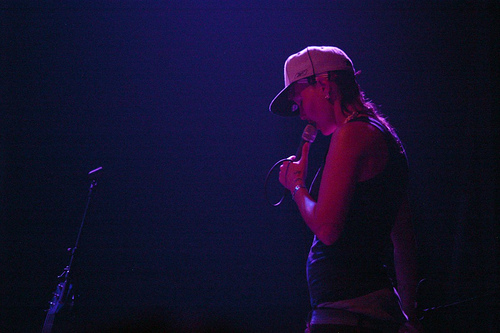
Bianca performing live in 2007.

In 2005, Bianca Casady was in a relationship with Devendra Banhart, with Banhart living with Casady and her mother Christina at Christina's farm in Saintes-Maries-de-la-Mer, a Romani village in southern France. Casady's relationship with Banhart ended in 2006. Banhart's 2007 album Smokey Rolls Down Thunder Canyon detailed his break up with Casady.

In 2006, Sierra started a side project, Metallic Falcons, with friend Matteah Baim. The project is signed to Voodoo Eros Records, a new label started by Bianca with business partner Melissa Shimkovitz. Bianca also opened the Voodoo Eros Museum Of Nice Items, an art gallery and performance space in New York City (123 Ludlow St) most recently home to an exhibition of Bianca's art Red Bone Slim VS. Itself: an Exhibition of Drawings.

=== 2007: The Adventures of Ghosthorse and Stillborn ===
CocoRosie's third full-length studio album, The Adventures of Ghosthorse and Stillborn, was released on April 10, 2007. It was produced by Valgeir Sigurðsson, Björk's longtime collaborator. The songs are about the Casady sisters' family and their deceased older half-brother Simon Casady. It was recorded at their mother's farm in the Camargue region of France. The album's cover is a photo by Pierre et Gilles that features Sierra as two women, and Bianca in drag. In a 2008 interview with AfterEllen.com, Bianca expressed surprise that many people do not realize she is queer, given that she frequently performs in drag.

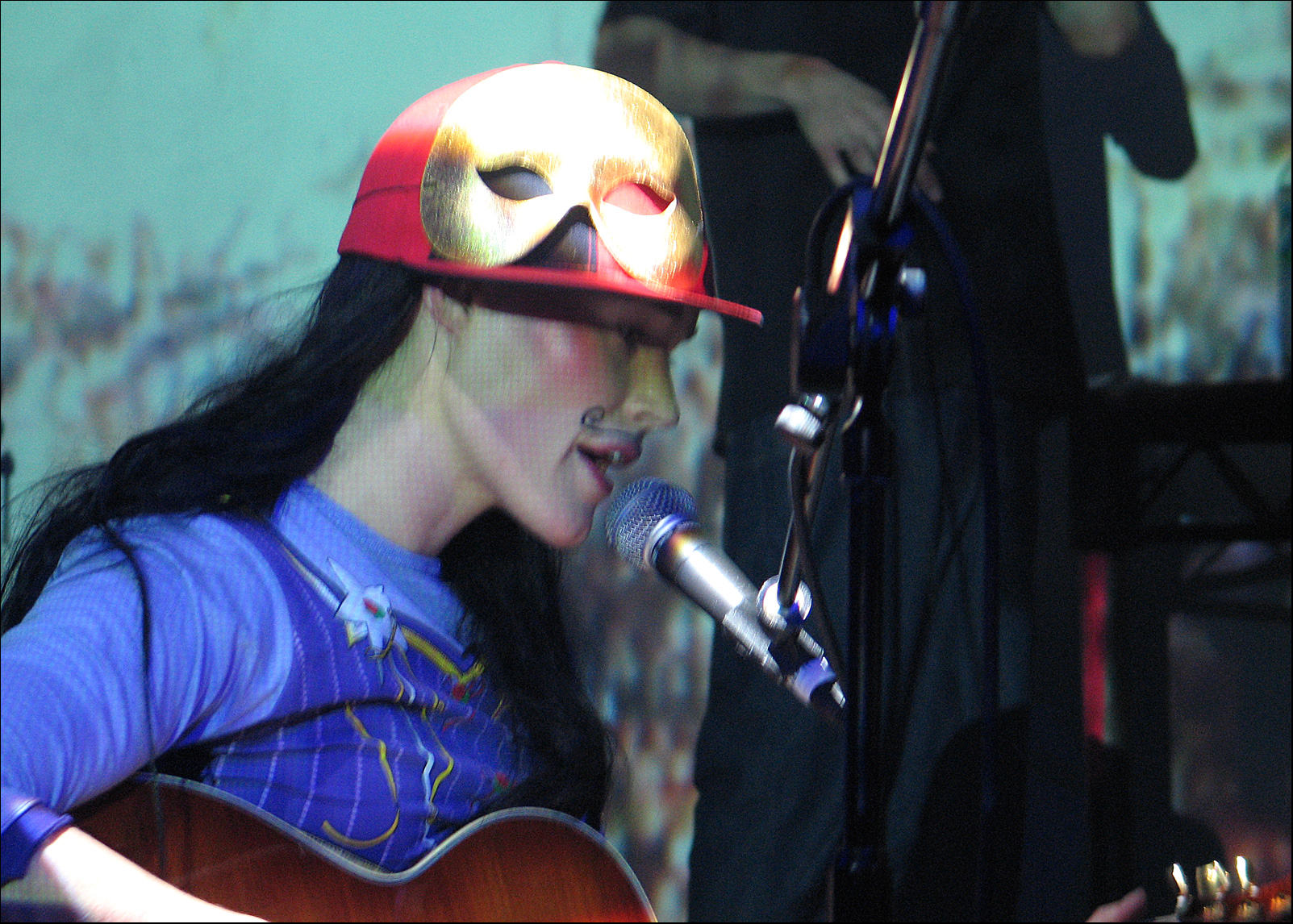
Sierra performing live in 2005.

In May 2007, while touring in support of The Adventures of Ghosthorse and Stillborn, the band was involved in an incident which resulted in the cancellation of the remainder of the North American leg of the tour. No official explanation was released; vague and unconfirmed reports claimed that unidentified members of the band were arrested and deported while crossing the Canada–US border.

=== 2008: "God Has a Voice, She Speaks Through Me" ===
On May 13, 2008, CocoRosie released a new single entitled "God Has a Voice, She Speaks Through Me". The song was released digitally and as a 7" picture disc single (limited to 3000 pieces). The B-side of the 7" features a short and untitled song, which merely consists of noises. Though the picture on the B-side of the vinyl has lyrics from the song "Hairnet Paradise", which was previously only performed live, the actual song on the recording is very different. The duo spent much of 2008 writing and recording in various locations such as Buenos Aires, Paris, New York, Melbourne, and Berlin where they also teamed up with artist Neda Sanai that is the spoken word voice on the song "R.I.P Burn Face".

=== 2009: Coconuts, Plenty of Junk Food ===
In 2009, CocoRosie's relationship with Touch and Go Records became unclear. A self-released EP entitled Coconuts, Plenty of Junk Food was made available for sale exclusively at CocoRosie shows on June 3, 2009.

=== 2010−2012: Grey Oceans ===
CocoRosie signed with Sub Pop records in 2010. Their fourth full-length album, Grey Oceans, was released on May 11, 2010.

=== 2013−2014: Tales of a GrassWidow ===
On June 5, 2012, CocoRosie released their double A-Side 7" single, "We Are On Fire", with Touch and Go Records. The cover art for the new single was a Twin Rivers collaboration between Bianca and Jesse Hazelip. Their fifth album, Tales of a GrassWidow, was released in the United States on May 27, 2013, on the City Slang record label.

=== 2015−2016: Heartache City and Bianca Casady and the C.i.A. ===
On February 6, 2015, the group confirmed on Twitter that they were working on a new album. Bianca later confirmed on Twitter that she was working on an upcoming solo album. In August 2015, CocoRosie announced that their album, Heartache City was set for release in late 2015. The group also released a behind the scenes video on their YouTube account of themselves in the studio recording two songs for the album, "Hairnet Paradise" and "Big and Black." On July 10, 2015, CocoRosie released a live version of a new song entitled "Heartache City" on their SoundCloud account, with the studio version to be released on their upcoming sixth album. Shortly after, CocoRosie posted the full album to stream on their SoundCloud page. It was premiered on The Fader. The duo also released the music video for new song "Lost Girls" on Facebook. The album was eventually released in October 2015.

In October 2015, Bianca announced details of her solo project, Bianca Casady and the C.i.A, also featuring Takuya Nakamura (bass guitar and trumpet), Doug Wieselman (clarinet and e-guitar), Lacy Lancaster (drums), Jean-Marc Ruellan (piano) and Bino Sauitzvy (dance).

CocoRosie have been frequent collaborators of American avant-garde theatre director Robert Wilson, composing scores to his award-winning international productions including "Peter Pan" (2013) at the Berliner Ensemble, "Pushkin's Fairy Tales" (2015) in Moscow, "Edda" (2017) at the Norske Theater in Oslo and "The Jungle Book" (2019) in Luxembourg. They have also performed at The Watermill Center.

=== 2017: "Smoke 'em Out" and subsequent album Put the Shine On ===
On January 17, 2017, the group released the single "Smoke 'em Out" featuring Anohni, a protest song against the presidential election of Donald Trump, while also confirming that they had started working on their next album, Put the Shine On.

== Other work ==
=== Word to the Crow ===
During a 2005 interview, Bianca and Sierra Casady described an album that they had recorded prior to La Maison de Mon Rêve. The sisters described the recording as a series of a cappella rap songs recorded live in a single take and was "the most psychotic thing you'll probably ever hear in your life". An article in the April 5, 2007 issue of Czech magazine HIS Voice about The Adventures of Ghosthorse and Stillborn mentioned a previously unknown body of work, created by the Casady sisters, titled Word to the Crow. Shortly after, on April 13, an article about CocoRosie on Czech news website Aktuálně wrote that on the day before the release of La Maison de Mon Rêve, the sisters recorded an "improvised rap album" of the same title.

On May 3, 2009, Portuguese music blog mojorising wrote that the sisters recorded "a hip hop album" titled Word to the Crow "just a few days before" recording La Maison de Mon Rêve, and later on May 21, the official website of the Byblos International Festival published an article saying that the sisters had "completed... a hip hop recording" of the same title prior to recording La Maison de Mon Rêve. On June 19, 2011, Russian blog lisaalya wrote that Word to the Crow was a "hip-hop record" and a "full album", recorded at the same time and in the same location as La Maison de Mon Rêve. On April 17, 2014, the album was added to CocoRosie's "artist description" on Last.fm and on June 19, 2018, All American Entertainment website and booking agency AAE Music added the album to their description of the group.

The track "The Moon asked the Crow" from the 2010 album Grey Oceans, described by critics as "a surreal mixture of classical tinkling... accompanied by a juddering hip-hop bounce" and "baroque piano noodling with a thumping, body-moving hip-hop beat", as well as having "hip-hop elements", a "moody, hip hop-inherited boom-boom-clap beat" and a "catchy hip-hoppy beat", could be inspired by or derived from the style of, if it exists, Word to the Crow. Crows are also referenced in the Grey Oceans track "Fairy Paradise" and the Put the Shine On tracks "Smash My Head" and "Hell's Gate".

== Commercial use ==
CocoRosie has composed film scores for the 2005 French film Frankie and the 2007 German film Haus der Wünsche (international: Paperbird).

The track "Candyland" was used in the 2007 film Anna M. The tracks "Bear Hides and Buffalo" and "Bloody Twins" are used in the 2008 gay zombie film Otto; or Up with Dead People by Bruce LaBruce. The tracks "Miracle", "Beautiful Boys", and "Honey or Tar" are used in the 2011 documentary Whores' Glory by Michael Glawogger. Sound illustrator Frédéric Sanchez used the tracks "Brazilian Sun", "Good Friday", and "Not for Sale" on the soundtrack for Miuccia Prada's Spring 2006 show, titling the piece "Coco Rosie Through the Looking Glass". The track "The Moon asked the Crow" was used in the Milan Fashion Week SS10 Runway soundtrack. The track "Werewolf" is sung repeatedly throughout the Swedish rendition of Shakespeare's Hamlet at the Royal Dramatic Theatre.

== Personal life ==
In August 2021, the Casady family house burned down in a forest fire. Bianca stated that "The fire took everything, our family history in a material sense, all of our mother's artwork and possessions, all of our family photographs, our collection of musical instruments and recording equipment, our costumes and on and on..." Although insurance covered the cost of rebuilding the house, it did not cover other expenses such as the cost of the music studio or musical instruments, so the Casady sisters launched a GoFundMe to cover costs.

== Politics ==
Radical feminism is a theme within Bianca and Sierra's music and art. They have vocally criticized patriarchal religion, particularly Christianity and Islam, which they refer to as "sky god religions". They reject criticism of their anti-religious views as political correctness, saying that cultural sensitivity can be a "big threat to feminism" and that they value women's rights more than freedom of religion.

Bianca Casady has signed the "Musicians for Palestine" statement in solidarity with the Palestinian movement.

== Discography ==
=== Albums ===
List of studio albums with chart positions
Title	Album details	Peak chart positions						
Title	Album details	AUT	BEL (Fl)	BEL (Wa)	FRA	NED	NOR	SUI
La maison de mon rêve	Released: 2004; Label: Touch and Go	–	–	–	–	–	–	–
Noah's Ark	Released: 2005; Label: Touch and Go	–	–	–	62	98	–	–
The Adventures of Ghosthorse and Stillborn	Released: 2007; Label: Touch and Go	–	24	57	21	49	39	84
Grey Oceans	Released: 2010; Label: Sub Pop	68	49	59	24	–	–	43
Tales of a GrassWidow	Released: 2013; Label: City Slang	49	49	64	27	99	–	43
Heartache City	Released: September 18, 2015; Label: Lost Girl	–	174	167	193	–	–	–
Put the Shine On	Released: March 13, 2020; Label: Marathon Artists	–	–	–	–	–	–	–
Little Death Wishes	Released: March 28, 2025; Label: Joyful Noise	–	–	–	–	–	–	–
"—" denotes a release that did not chart or was not released in that territory.

=== Extended plays ===
List of extended plays
Title	EP details
Beautiful Boyz	Released: 2004; Label: Touch and Go Records
Coconuts, Plenty of Junk Food	Released: 2009; Label: self-released

=== Singles ===
Year	Single	Peak positions	Notes
Year	Single	FRA	Notes
2008	"God Has a Voice, She Speaks Through Me"	–	Digital single (3,000 pieces sold on vinyl limited release), with an untitled track on the B-side, consisting mostly of noises and distorted singing
2010	"Lemonade"	74	From the album Grey Oceans
2012	"We Are On Fire / Tearz for Animals"	–	Recorded with Dave Sitek (TV on the Radio), featuring Antony Hegarty, 7" and digital single
2013	"Gravediggress"	–	From the album Tales of a GrassWidow
2017	"Smoke 'em Out"	–	Anti-Trump protest song, written for the Women's March on Washington, featuring Anohni
2019	"Lamb & the Wolf"	–	
2020	"Aloha Friday"	–	
2023	"Witch Hunt"	–	Released as a digital single September 15th 2023. An alternate version was also released in late 2024, on a 7" lathe cut vinly. Limited to 333 as part of Joyful Noise Recordings Early bird VIP membership.

== Music videos ==
- "Noah's Ark"
- "Rainbowarriors"
- "God Has a Voice, She Speaks Through Me"
- "Lemonade"
- "Gallows"
- "We Are On Fire"
- "After The Afterlife"
- "Child Bride"
- "Gravediggress"
- "Restless"
- "Lost Girls"
- "Smash My Head"
- "GO AWAY!"
- "Cut Stitch Scar"
- "Least I Have You"
