= Noah's Ark (album) =

Studio album by CocoRosie
- Released: September 13, 2005
- Genre: Freak folk
- Length: 44:25
- Label: Touch and Go

CocoRosie chronology
La maison de mon rêve (2004)	Noah's Ark (2005)	The Adventures of Ghosthorse and Stillborn (2007)

Noah's Ark is the second studio album by American musical group CocoRosie, released by Touch and Go Records on September 13, 2005. The album features collaborations with various musicians, including Anohni, Devendra Banhart, and Spleen.

== Recording ==
Noah's Ark features sisters Sierra "Rosie" Casady and Bianca "Coco" Casady on vocals, with traditional instruments including guitars and harps layered over unconventional items used as instruments. The track "Bear Hides and Buffalo" includes a loop of horse and cat sounds over a toy piano hook. Upon the album's release, Bianca described the group’s sound as "sort of an eclectic montage," saying they "float around between a few different instruments and use a bunch of unconventional percussion things. Like toys."

The album was produced and recorded in many different locations, including their mother's farm in Saintes-Maries-de-la-Mer in the Camargue region of Provence. Sierra stated that "the pursuit of intimate venues" lead to the sisters "pulling over on the side of the road and just recording in a field, or taking a moment in a barn in the South of France, or a studio in Brooklyn."

=== Collaborations ===
Anohni (formerly of Antony and the Johnsons and credited as Antony Hegarty) provides vocals and plays piano on the track "Beautiful Boyz", an ode to French novelist, playwright, and convicted felon Jean Genet. Devendra Banhart provides vocals through a cell phone on the track "Brazilian Sun". The opening rhymes of "Bisounours" come courtesy of French rapper Spleen. The album also lists Greg Rogove, Diane Cluck, Jana Hunter and Ardzen as "contributing artists."

== Cover art ==
Bianca Casady said she drew the picture and allowed her sister to tweak the colors. Unintended for the album, Bianca said she was, "Just drawing animals. We kind of like to think of it as a dejected, left behind creature. They're kind of like zebracorns. It's like tears or blood. It's the female. She's in this moment of ecstasy but also it's kind of overwhelming. So she's like bleeding or crying."

== Critical reception ==
Professional ratings
Aggregate scores
Source	Rating
Metacritic	67/100
Review scores
Source	Rating
AllMusic	3.5/5 stars
Alternative Press	4/5
The Guardian	2/5 stars
The Independent	4/5 stars
Mojo	4/5 stars
NME	6/10
Pitchfork	3.4/10
Q	4/5 stars
Spin	F
Uncut	4/5 stars

At Metacritic, which assigns a weighted average score out of 100 to reviews from mainstream critics, the album received an average score of 67, based on 24 reviews, indicating "generally favorable reviews".

MusicOMH London writer Michael Hubbard wrote, "Noah's Ark has a dreamlike quality to it." Sarah Peters, a former music editor and staff writer for LAS wrote, "Symbolically, the guiding light is important to all who have journeyed on Noah's Ark, and CocoRosie have presented a lesson in love, through hardship, that may not have been as powerful otherwise." In comparison to the sisters' previous work, writer Johnny Ray Huston of the San Francisco Bay Guardian noted, "Their new album, Noah's Ark (Touch and Go), has a more restless feel than their debut – the scratchy, tiny, Victrola-sounding vocals of La Maison sometimes give way to a more naturalistic recording style." Another review came from Heather Phares, writer for AllMusic, who commented on the album’s vibe in particular. "There's a lot of power in the album's darkness, particularly on the apocalyptic campfire singalong "Armageddon"".

Although some of the album's reviews were positive, some critics disagreed claiming, "Noah's Ark is more hypnotic and infiltrating than their enchanting (but short shelf-lived) debut, Le Maison de Mon Reve, but ultimately less magical." Other viewpoints were expressed about the contributing artists on the album and how "…the best offerings inevitably arrive in the presence of Antony and Devendra Banhart, whose guest appearances enhance and possibly upstage their lovely hosts."

No Ripcord placed it at number 42 on the "Top 50 Albums of 2005" list.

== Track listing ==
No.	Title	Length
1.	"K-Hole"	4:10
2.	"Beautiful Boyz"	4:37
3.	"South 2nd"	4:09
4.	"Bear Hides and Buffalo"	4:14
5.	"Tekno Love Song"	3:54
6.	"The Sea Is Calm"	3:39
7.	"Noah's Ark"	4:13
8.	"Milk"	0:34
9.	"Armageddon"	4:04
10.	"Brazilian Sun"	4:38
11.	"Bisounours"	4:06
12.	"Honey or Tar"	2:08
Total length:		44:25

Australian edition bonus track
No.	Title	Length
13.	"Oh Sailor"	3:50

== Charts ==
Chart	Peak position
Dutch Albums (Album Top 100)	98
French Albums (SNEP)	62
