= Máscara Dorada =

Máscara Dorada may refer to:

- Gran Metalik (born 1988), a Mexican professional wrestler who wrestled as Máscara Dorada from 2008 to 2016
- Máscara Dorada II (born 2001), a Mexican professional wrestler who has performed under the ring name Máscara Dorada since 2023
- Mascarita Dorada (born 1982), a Mexican Mini-Estrella ("Mini-Star") professional wrestler

== See also ==
- Golden Mask
