= Brooke Medicine Eagle =

American author

Brooke Medicine Eagle (also known as Brooke Edwards, born 1943) is an American author, singer/songwriter and teacher, specializing in her interpretations of Native American religions. She frequently teaches workshops at New Age and other events.

== Biography ==
Eagle was born and raised in Montana. She studied at the University of Denver obtaining a BA degree in psychology and mathematics and a MA in counseling psychology from the University of Denver.

She has claimed to be descended from six Native American tribes, including Cherokee, Crow, Cree, Piegan Blackfeet, and some "Sioux and Nez Perce ancestry," as well as European blood from Scotland, Ireland, and Denmark. She also posted a Crow Tribe enrollment card on her website until tribe officials revealed it was a forgery.

Eagle is cited as an example of New Age Indigenous appropriation in publishing. In 1984, the American Indian Movement included Eagle among those it said were responsible for "a great attack or theft" of Native American ceremonies. Cynthia Snavely connected Eagle to the "misappropriation of Native American spirituality [that] takes place within the New Age spirituality movement".

Bianca Casady of the musical group CocoRosie has referred to Brooke Medicine Eagle as her mother's partner, stating "As a small child I was carried in a papoose around sacred Anasazi grounds by my mother and her partner, Brook[e] Medicine Eagle."

== See also ==
- Plastic shaman

== Works ==
=== Audio ===
- A Gift of Song (CD). 1995.
- Visions Speaking (CD). 1996.
- Gathering the Sacred Breath (CD). 2003.
- Live from the Shaman's Cave (CD). 2005.
- For my People (CD). 2005.

=== Books ===
- Eagle, Brooke Medicine (1991). Buffalo Woman Comes Singing: The Spirit Song of a Rainbow Medicine Woman. Random House Publishing. ISBN 978-0-345-36143-1.
- Eagle, Brooke Medicine (2000). The Last Ghost Dance: A Guide for Earth Mages. National Geographic Books. ISBN 978-0-345-40031-4.
