= Lemonade (CocoRosie song) =

Single by CocoRosie

from the album Grey Oceans
- Released: April 17, 2010
- Genre: Freak folk, Hip hop, Experimental
- Label: Sub Pop Records
- Songwriter(s): Bianca Casady, Sierra Casady, Gael Rakotondrabe
- Producer(s): CocoRosie

CocoRosie singles chronology
"'God Has a Voice, She Speaks Through Me'" (2008)	"Lemonade" (2010)	"'We Are On Fire / Tears for Animals'" (2012)

Music video
- "Lemonade" on YouTube

"Lemonade" is a single by experimental band CocoRosie, released on April 17, 2010, from their album Grey Oceans. The B-side of the CD contains a cover of the Beach Boys' song "Surfer Girl". While both sisters of CocoRosie wrote the single, the music for the album was also contributed to by keyboardist/composer Gael Rakotondrabe.

== Background ==
In an interview with Metro New York, Sierra "Rosie" Casady stated that the album was strongly influenced by "spooky memories from growing up in the desert," such as stealing a car (despite being "way too young to drive") and hunting rabbits, an activity referenced in the song. "Just shoot them through the window while we were driving," said Casady, "and take them home and skin them and make a big rabbit stew. That was a pretty dramatic memory for us."

Bianca has stated that the opening lines of the song - "It was Cinco de Mayo/Pillowcase on his head/No more breathing time/An ambulance sped/It sped ‘round every corner/Calling out his name" - is a reference to the 2006 death of their older half-brother Simon Casady.

== Critical reception ==
James Reed of the Boston Globe said that Lemonade was a "genuine thrill" compared to the rest of the album, explaining that "after Bianca’s grim recitations, Sierra pierced the song with a gleeful interlude, her distorted voice making her sound like a psychedelic Judy Garland." Grant Lawrence for American Songwriter magazine exclaimed, "Both the title track and the brilliant “Lemonade” are beautiful piano ballads that deliver some of their clearest and most focused lyrics." Chris Mincher for The A.V. Club said the song "mashes together eerie, dreary techno balladry with a softly orchestral chorus" and was one of the more "catchy and cerebral" songs on the album, along with "The Moon Asked The Crow". A review in Qué! stated that CocoRosie managed to "ignite the audience with their sublime song, Lemonade."

Billboard's review explained that the song especially showed the duality evident in the album because it featured "melancholy piano over verses about death, juxtaposed with a cheerful pop chorus accompanied by warm vocal harmonies". A reviewer for music blog Stereogum said that they "generally like the group best when they sound insular and emotionally naked but impenetrable and unexpectedly catchy. This one does that trick." In a separate review of the album, the same Stereogum reviewer stated that the music video for Lemonade is a "gorgeously surreal, intimately familial clip". Heather Phares of Allmusic complimented the song, giving it an "album pick," signifying it was one of the better tracks from the album. She reviewed the song by saying it "captures summer’s idyllic beauty by melding a melody that sounds like it could be from a long-lost Broadway musical with trip-hop-tinged beats, electro synths, and brass." Matthew Fiander of Prefix Magazine called the song "moody and surging, the kind of lofty yet pulsing song that reminds us how CocoRosie pulled such visceral reactions out of us for the last six years", especially when compared to the "slack-yet-shimmering keys and overly simple beats" of the other songs on the album.

On the other hand, Dan Cairns of The Sunday Times said that the song was a "lyrically opaque and vocally screeching collage".

== Charts ==
Chart (2010)	Peak position
French Singles Chart	74
