= Algonquian Confederacy of the Quinnipiac Tribal Council =

Nonprofit organization in Indiana

- Algonquian Confederacy of the Quinnipiac Tribal Council
- Named after: Algonquian peoples, Quinnipiac people
- Formation: 1991
- Founder: Iron Thunderhorse
- Type: nonprofit organization
- Tax ID no.: EIN 06-1301617
- Purpose: Human Services (P20)
- Headquarters: Milltown, Indiana
- Location: United States
- Official language: English

The Algonquian Confederacy of the Quinnipiac Tribal Council (ACQTC) is a cultural heritage group and nonprofit organization of individuals who identify as descendants of the Quinnipiac people. They are based in Milltown, Indiana, but also hold events in Connecticut.

== Status ==
The Algonquian Confederacy of the Quinnipiac Tribal Council is an unrecognized tribe. This organization is neither a federally recognized tribe nor a state-recognized tribe.

== Nonprofit ==
In 1991, the Algonquian Confederacy of the Quinnipiac Tribal Council, Inc. registered a nonprofit organization.

Their registered address is in Milltown, Indiana, while the registered agent's address is in Branford, Connecticut.

Gordon "Fox Running" Brainerd is the group's registered agent. Ruth Thunderhorse formerly served as the principal officer. She goes by "Little Owl," lives in Indiana, and is married to Iron Thunderhorse, who has been imprisoned in Texas for "rape, kidnapping, and robbery" since 1977.

Officers include:

- Rober Pokras
- Edward "Wolf-Walker" Conley
- Gordon Brainerd
- Iron Thunderhorse
- Kathy Mallory
- Lisa Dawes
- Patricia "Chickadee" Pool
- Paul "Coyote-Song" Tobin
- and others.

== Activities ==
The Algonquian Confederacy of the Quinnipiac Tribal Council has held powwows at the Old Stone Church in East Haven, Connecticut.

They founded the Algonquian Confederacies Language Institute in 1999.

Gordon "Running Fox" Brainerd (d. 2021), who identified as the ACQTC Bear Clan Medicine Chief, lectured on American Indian history and donated his personal items to the Dudley Farm Museum in Guilford, Connecticut. Brainerd collected ancient Native American tool through digs in Branford, Guilford, and Madison, Connecticut. He was never able to establish a genealogical connection to the historic Quinnipiac tribe.

== See also ==
- List of organizations that self-identify as Native American tribes
