= Plastic shaman =

Fraudulent spiritual practitioner

Plastic shamans, or plastic medicine people, is a pejorative colloquialism applied to individuals who attempt to pass themselves off as shamans, holy people, or other traditional spiritual leaders, but who have no genuine connection to the traditions or cultures they claim to represent. In some cases, the "plastic shaman" may have some genuine cultural connection, but is seen to be exploiting that knowledge for ego, power, or money.

Plastic shamans are believed by their critics to use the mystique of these cultural traditions, and the legitimate curiosity of sincere seekers, for their personal gain. In some cases, exploitation of students and traditional culture may involve the selling of fake "traditional" spiritual ceremonies, fake artifacts, fictional accounts in books, illegitimate tours of sacred sites, and often the chance to buy spiritual titles. Often Native American symbols and terms are adopted by plastic shamans, and their adherents are insufficiently familiar with Native American religion to distinguish between imitations and actual Native religion.

== Overview ==
The term "plastic shaman" originated among Native American and First Nations activists and is most often applied to people fraudulently posing as Native American traditional healers. People who have been referred to as "plastic shamans" include those believed to be fraudulent, self-proclaimed spiritual advisors, seers, psychics, self-identified New Age shamans, or other practitioners of non-traditional modalities of spirituality and healing who are operating on a fraudulent basis. "Plastic shaman" has also been used to refer to non-Natives who pose as Native American authors, especially if the writer is misrepresenting Indigenous spiritual ways (such as in the case of Ku Klux Klan member Asa Earl Carter and the scandal around his book The Education of Little Tree).

It is a very alarming trend. So alarming that it came to the attention of an international and intertribal group of medicine people and spiritual leaders called the Circle of Elders. They were highly concerned with these activities and during one of their gatherings addressed the issue by publishing a list of Plastic Shamans in Akwesasne Notes, along with a plea for them to stop their exploitative activities. One of the best known Plastic Shamans, Lynn Andrews, has been picketed by the Native communities in New York, Minneapolis, San Francisco, Seattle and other cities.

People have been injured, and some have died, in fraudulent sweat lodge ceremonies performed by non-Natives.

Among critics, this misappropriation and misrepresentation of Indigenous intellectual property is seen as an exploitative form of colonialism and one step in the destruction of Indigenous cultures:

The para-esoteric Indianess of Plastic Shamanism creates a neocolonial miniature with multilayered implications. First and foremost, it is suggested that the passé Injun elder is incapable of forwarding their knowledge to the rest of the white world. Their former white trainee, once thoroughly briefed in Indian spirituality, represents the truly erudite expert to pass on wisdom. This rationale, once again, reinforces nature-culture dualisms. The Indian stays the doomed barbaric pet, the Indianized is the eloquent and sophisticated medium to the outer, white world. Silenced and visually annihilated like that, the Indian retreats to prehistory, while the Plastic Shaman can monopolize their culture.

Defenders of the integrity of indigenous religion use the term "plastic shaman" to criticize those they believe are potentially dangerous and who may harm the reputations of the cultures and communities they claim to represent. There is evidence that, in the most extreme cases, fraudulent and sometimes criminal acts have been committed by a number of these imposters. It is also claimed by traditional peoples that in some cases these plastic shamans may be using corrupt, negative and sometimes harmful aspects of authentic practices. In many cases this has led to the actual traditional spiritual elders declaring the plastic shaman and their work to be "dark" or "evil" from the perspective of traditional standards of acceptable conduct.

Plastic shamans are also believed to be dangerous because they give people false ideas about traditional spirituality and ceremonies. In some cases, the plastic shamans will require that the ceremonies are performed in the nude, and that men and women participate in the ceremony together, although such practices are an innovation and were not traditionally followed. Another innovation may include the introduction of sex magic or "tantric" elements, which may be a legitimate form of spirituality in its own right (when used in its original cultural context), but in this context it is an importation from a different tradition and is not part of authentic Native practices.

The results of this appropriation of Indigenous knowledge have led some tribes, intertribal councils, and the United Nations General Assembly to issue several declarations on the subject:

4. We especially urge all our Lakota, Dakota, and Nakota people to take action to prevent our own people from contributing to and enabling the abuse of our sacred ceremonies and spiritual practices by outsiders; for, as we all know, there are certain ones among our own people who are prostituting our spiritual ways for their own selfish gain, with no regard for the spiritual well-being of the people as a whole.

5. We assert a posture of zero-tolerance for any "white man's shaman" who rises from within our own communities to "authorize" the expropriation of our ceremonial ways by non-Indians; all such "plastic medicine men" are enemies of the Lakota, Dakota and Nakota people.

— Declaration of War Against Exploiters of Lakota Spirituality

Article 11: Indigenous peoples have the right to practise and revitalize their cultural traditions and customs. This includes the right to maintain, protect and develop the past, present and future manifestations of their cultures, such as archaeological and historical sites, artefacts, designs, ceremonies, technologies and visual and performing arts and literature. ... States shall provide redress through effective mechanisms, which may include restitution, developed in conjunction with indigenous peoples, with respect to their cultural, intellectual, religious and spiritual property taken without their free, prior and informed consent or in violation of their laws, traditions and customs.

— Declaration on the Rights of Indigenous Peoples

Article 31: 1. Indigenous peoples have the right to maintain, control, protect and develop their cultural heritage, traditional knowledge and traditional cultural expressions, as well as the manifestations of their sciences, technologies and cultures, including human and genetic resources, seeds, medicines, knowledge of the properties of fauna and flora, oral traditions, literatures, designs, sports and traditional games and visual and performing arts. They also have the right to maintain, control, protect and develop their intellectual property over such cultural heritage, traditional knowledge, and traditional cultural expressions.

— Declaration on the Rights of Indigenous Peoples

Therefore, be warned that these individuals are moving about playing upon the spiritual needs and ignorance of our non-Indian brothers and sisters. The value of these instructions and ceremonies are questionable, maybe meaningless, and hurtful to the individual carrying false messages.

— Resolution of the 5th Annual Meeting of the Traditional Elders Circle

Many of those who work to expose plastic shamans believe that the abuses perpetuated by spiritual frauds can only exist when there is ignorance about the cultures a fraudulent practitioner claims to represent. Activists working to uphold the rights of traditional cultures work not only to expose the fraudulent distortion and exploitation of Indigenous traditions and Indigenous communities, but also to educate seekers about the differences between traditional cultures and the often-distorted modern approaches to spirituality.

One indicator of a plastic shaman might be someone who discusses "Native American spirituality" but does not mention any specific Native American tribe. The "New Age Frauds and Plastic Shamans" website discusses potentially plastic shamans.

== Terminology ==
The word "shaman" originates from the Evenki word šamán. The term came into usage among Europeans via Russians interacting with the Indigenous peoples in Siberia. From there, "shamanism" was picked up by anthropologists to describe any cultural practice that involves vision-seeking and communication with the spirits, no matter how diverse the cultures included in this generalisation. Native American and First Nations spiritual people use terms in their own languages to describe their traditions; their spiritual teachers, leaders or elders are not called "shamans". One significant promoter of this view of a global shamanism was the Beat Generation writer Gary Snyder, whose 1951 PhD thesis treated Haida religion as a form of shamanic practice, and whose subsequent poetry promotes the idea of the Pacific Rim as "a single cultural zone and a single bioregion." Other writers promoting the idea of a generalised shamanic religion in this period also include Robert Bly, who stated that "the most helpful addition to thought about poetry in the past thirty years has been the concept of the poet as a relative of the shaman ... I am a shaman." Snyder and Bly's remarks attest to the deep investment in shamanism in 1960s and 1970s counterculture. Leslie Marmon Silko would later condemn Snyder's appropriations of Native religions in her 1978 essay "An Old-Fashioned Indian Attack in Two Parts". Later, Michael Harner would develop the concept of neoshamanism, or "core shamanism", which also makes the unfounded claim that the ways of several North American tribes share more than surface elements with those of the Siberian Shamans. This misappellation led to many non-Natives assuming Harner's inventions were traditional Indigenous ceremonies. Geary Hobson sees the New Age use of the term shamanism as a cultural appropriation of Native American culture by white people who have distanced themselves from their own history.

In Nepal, the term Chicken Shaman is used.

=== Documentary film ===
A 1996 documentary about this phenomenon, White Shamans and Plastic Medicine Men, was directed by Terry Macy and Daniel Hart.

== See also ==
- Brooke Medicine Eagle
- Colonialism
- Cultural appropriation
- Cultural imperialism
- Declaration on the Rights of Indigenous Peoples
- Fraudulent Mediums Act 1951 – British legislation that both combats plastic shamanism and repeals the Witchcraft Act 1735
- Hollywood Indian
- Huna (New Age)
- Indigenous intellectual property
- Iron Thunderhorse
- Legend of the Rainbow Warriors
- Native American hobbyism in Germany
- Native Americans in German popular culture
- Neoshamanism
- Noble savage
- Passing as Indigenous Americans
- Plastic Paddy
- Pretendian
- Q Shaman
- Rolling Thunder
- Stereotypes of Native Americans
- T. Lobsang Rampa – English writer (1910–1981)
- Traditional knowledge
- Twinkie (slur)
- Xenocentrism
