= The Adventures of Ghosthorse and Stillborn =

Studio album by CocoRosie
- Released: April 10, 2007
- Genre: Freak folk
- Length: 48:44
- Label: Touch and Go
- Producers: CocoRosie; Valgeir Sigurðsson

CocoRosie chronology
Noah's Ark (2005)	The Adventures of Ghosthorse and Stillborn (2007)	Grey Oceans (2010)

The Adventures of Ghosthorse and Stillborn is the third studio album by American musical group CocoRosie, released by Touch and Go Records on April 10, 2007.

== Recording ==
CocoRosie made the preliminary recordings for The Adventures of Ghosthorse and Stillborn in a barn at their mother's farm in Saintes-Maries-de-la-Mer in the Camargue region of Southern France, which they turned into a makeshift studio. The creaking echoes and sounds of the old, wooden barn lend an otherworldly feel to the album. Running on a nocturnal schedule, the Casady sisters found inspiration their surroundings: the distant sounds of animals, the hum of nightlife around sounds of the night on an old-fashioned Dictaphone. In an interview with Electronic Musician in 2007, Bianca commented, "I feel like it added the atmosphere of a lot of songs, a lot of things you couldn't do in a proper studio. It was important for the creative process to start out in this space." Some of the characters featured on the album are about people buried in the old graveyard on their mother's farm. Some of the graves belonged to children, including an infant, hence the "Stillborn" in the album's title. "Ghosthorse" is a reference to an "animal friend" they made on the farm.

Two members of the Casady family died during production of the album. The Casady sisters' older half-brother Simon Randall Casady died on Cinco de Mayo (May 5th) of 2006 and their paternal grandfather Simon Wheeler Casady III died later in the same month.

Beatboxing, provided by the Casady sisters' friends Tez and French rapper Spleen, is featured on multiple tracks. Valgeir Sigurðsson, Icelandic producer known for his work with singer-songwriter Björk, assisted in the recording and mixing of the album.

== Artwork ==
The cover art for album was done by Pierre et Gilles, a French art duo. Much like CocoRosie, homo-eroticism, religion, glamour, and myth are recurring themes in the work of Pierre et Gilles. The photograph for The Adventures of Ghosthorse and Stillborn depicts Bianca and Sierra in Victorian dress with Bianca kneeling at her own side, dressed as a soldier.

Bianca is no stranger to dressing in drag. She regularly performs wearing a fake mustache and appears dressed as a man in several music videos, including the video for the track "Rainbowarriors". In an interview with AfterEllen in 2008, Bianca expressed surprise and pleasure at never being criticized for her portrayal of gender, saying, "I find it interesting that as a 'female' artist in this time, I can go in complete drag on a regular basis and no one really notices, where as an artist like [Anohni and the Johnsons singer Anohni] was torn apart about [her] transexuality in all of the first major articles written about [her]."

== Critical reception ==
Professional ratings
Aggregate scores
Source	Rating
Metacritic	60/100
Review scores
Source	Rating
AllMusic	4/5 stars
BBC	2/5 stars
The Guardian	2/5 stars
MusicOMH	4/5 stars
Pitchfork	2.3/10
PopMatters	6/10 stars
Rolling Stone	2.5/5 stars
The Stranger	3/4 stars
Stylus Magazine	C+
Tiny Mix Tapes	3/5 stars

At Metacritic, which assigns a weighted average score out of 100 to reviews from mainstream critics, the album received an average score of 60, based on 23 reviews, indicating "mixed or average reviews".

Marc Hogan of Pitchfork described the majority of the album as "lazy, meandering nothings". Grant Purdom of Tiny Mix Tapes praised the risks CocoRosie took on the album, while critiquing the attempts at hip-hop. Heather Phares of AllMusic praised the production of the album, specifically the production of the tracks "Animals" and "Raphael". Alex Macpherson of The Guardian felt that "[CocoRosie seemed] to have no interest in developing [the album's] fragments of ideas into a coherent artistic whole."

The track "Rainbowarriors", based on the "Legend of the Rainbow Warriors" fakelore as well as Henry Wadsworth Longfellow's poem The Song of Hiawatha, was also accused of "race-baiting" and "naïve and insensitive appropriation of Native American mythology."

== Track listing ==
All tracks are written by CocoRosie, except "Houses" by Devendra Banhart.

No.	Title	Length
1.	"Rainbowarriors"	3:55
2.	"Promise"	3:37
3.	"Bloody Twins"	1:37
4.	"Japan"	5:02
5.	"Sunshine"	2:58
6.	"Black Poppies"	2:37
7.	"Werewolf"	4:50
8.	"Animals"	6:02
9.	"Houses"	2:56
10.	"Raphael"	2:48
11.	"Girl and the Geese"	0:46
12.	"Miracle"	3:35
Total length:		48:44

UK edition bonus track
No.	Title	Length
13.	"Childhood"	5:02

Japanese edition bonus track
No.	Title	Length
13.	"Swamp Tearz"	5:19

== Personnel ==
Credits adapted from liner notes.

- CocoRosie – production, engineering, mixing
- Valgeir Sigurðsson – production, engineering, mixing
- Ton Coyen – mastering
- Pierre & Gilles – cover photography

== Charts ==
Chart	Peak position
Belgian Albums (Ultratop Flanders)	24
Belgian Albums (Ultratop Wallonia)	57
Dutch Albums (Album Top 100)	49
French Albums (SNEP)	21
German Albums (Offizielle Top 100)	64
Norwegian Albums (VG-lista)	39
Swiss Albums (Schweizer Hitparade)	84
