= Tales of a GrassWidow =

Studio album by CocoRosie
- Released: May 27, 2013
- Genre: Indie pop, indie folk, folktronica
- Length: 59:56
- Label: City Slang, Republic of Music
- Producer: CocoRosie; Valgeir Sigurðsson

CocoRosie chronology
Grey Oceans (2010)	Tales of a GrassWidow (2013)	Heartache City (2015)

Singles from Tales of a GrassWidow
- 1. "Gravediggress" Released: February 19, 2013; 2. "After the Afterlife" Released: April 2, 2013

Tales of a GrassWidow, sometimes stylized as Tales of a Grasswidow, is the fifth studio album by American musical group CocoRosie. It was released by independent record labels City Slang and Republic of Music on May 27, 2013, in the United Kingdom and May 28, 2013, in the United States. The album's sound has been described as "indie pop" and "indie folk".

== Critical reception ==
Professional ratings
Aggregate scores
Source	Rating
Metacritic	75/100
Review scores
Source	Rating
AllMusic	4/5 stars
Clash	8/10
Consequence of Sound	C+
The Line of Best Fit	6.5/10
MusicOMH	3.5/5 stars
The Observer	3/5 stars
Pitchfork	6.7/10
PopMatters	8/10 stars

Tales of a GrassWidow received generally positive reviews. At Metacritic, which assigns a weighted average score out of 100 to reviews from mainstream critics, the album received an average score of 75, based on 18 reviews, indicating "generally favorable reviews".

The Guardian's Phil Mongredien gave the album a rating of 3 out of 5 stars, praising the versatility of Bianca Casady's vocals ("at times childlike, an instant later carrying the emotional heft of Billie Holiday") but stating that "too much of the material … is content to merely sit in the background, not something from which they usually suffer". In a review for music blog GoldFlakePaint, Lee Adcock stated that Tales of a GrassWidow's best moments "are its most minimal ones", describing the track "Broken Chariot" as the "most captivating" and "only intimate" track on the album, and suggesting that while "the production is even crisper" and the "techno beats are even more prominent", much of the album is "crowded with incongruous ideas" and "just snatches of abstract poetry, all striking at certain verses, but perplexing when strung together".

In a review for Pitchfork, assigning the album a rating of 6.7 out of 10, Brian Howe described Tales of a GrassWidow as "remarkably straightforward" and "remarkably pleasant" in comparison to CocoRosie's previous records, noting the "practical songwriting, with refreshingly natural vocals and themes that tend toward the soapy and sentimental". Howe praised the "sleek Valgeir Sigurðsson production", the "juiced-up piano and synth bounce" of the track "After the Afterlife", the "velvety Mesoamerican flutes" of the track "Broken Chariot", and the "folksy … cracked brightness" of the track "Roots of My Hair", opining that the album "feels like a long-held transgressive impulse spending its last momentum, beneficially redirecting energy into more direct emotional appeals".

== Track listing ==
All tracks are written by Sierra Rose Casady and Bianca Leilani Casady, and former member Gaël Alfred Rakotondrabé where noted.

No.	Title	Writer(s)	Length
1.	"After the Afterlife"	Gaël Alfred Rakotondrabé	3:03
2.	"Tears for Animals*"		5:18
3.	"Child Bride"		4:18
4.	"Broken Chariot"		2:14
5.	"End of Time"	Gaël Alfred Rakotondrabé	3:20
6.	"Harmless Monster"	Gaël Alfred Rakotondrabé	3:07
7.	"Gravediggress"		5:26
8.	"Far Away"		4:36
9.	"Roots of My Hair"		5:58
10.	"Villain"		4:19
11.	"Poison" / "Devil's Island"		18:18
Total length:			59:56

*Not to be confused with the track "Tearz for Animals", featuring British singer Anonhi, from CocoRosie's 2012 double-sided single "We Are On Fire".

== Personnel ==
Credits adapted from liner notes.

- CocoRosie – performance, production, recording, artwork
- Gael Rakotondrabe – arrangement (1, 5, 10), piano (1, 5, 6), keyboards (1, 5, 10), synthesizer (1, 5), guitar (5), organ (10)
- Antony Hegarty – vocals (2, 11)
- Tez – human beatbox (2, 5, 7, 8, 10)
- Valgeir Sigurðsson – drum programming (2, 7, 8, 9, 11), production, recording
- Ashok Foga – vocals (3), drums (3)
- Mahipai Foga – castanet (3)
- Kusumakar – bamboo flute (3, 4)
- Ashley "Say Wut?!" Moyer – human beatbox (6), vocals (9)
- Finnbogi Petursson – tones (8, 11)
- Ezekiel Healy – guitar (9)
- Nico Kalwill – additional production, engineering, mixing
- Paul Evans – additional recording
- Jon Trier Ottossen – engineering assistance
- Scott Hull – mastering
- Jean-Marc Ruellan – layout
- Jesse Hazelip – lettering

== Charts ==
Chart	Peak position
Austrian Albums (Ö3 Austria)	49
Belgian Albums (Ultratop Flanders)	49
Belgian Albums (Ultratop Wallonia)	64
Dutch Albums (Album Top 100)	99
French Albums (SNEP)	27
German Albums (Offizielle Top 100)	47
Swiss Albums (Schweizer Hitparade)	43
