= What's On The Hi-Fi =

- Website type: Music webzine
- Available in: English
- Headquarters: {{{location_country}}}
- Website: whatsonthehifi.com

What's On The Hi-Fi (WOTHF) is a NYC and Paris-based new music webzine. It is a free access and editorially independent webzine including album and track reviews, artist interviews and various features. All music appearing on What's On The Hi-Fi is used with permission.

== Background ==
In early 2009, What's On The Hi-Fi was created by co-founders Jonathan Hutchison (NYC) and JH Smith (Paris) out of a desire to feature and support new and eclectic independent music from around the globe.

What's On The Hi-Fi has participated in notable interviews with international up-and-coming and established artists such as Beach House, The Antlers, Liars, White Denim, Cocoon, Team Ghost, and The Ruby Suns. The webzine announced that original video content would be added to the website beginning in 2010.

Reviews, interviews and features from What's On The Hi-Fi have been reprinted by various media sources, including artist and label webpages / promotional materials and music-related websites.

In early 2010, What's On The Hi-Fi participated in Longplay, Face B project of Paris-based artist Daniela Franco. Face B is both a website-based project as well a collection of rare vinyl and album art which was held in conjunction with the Vinyl exhibit curated by Guy Schraenen on exhibit at the Paris art foundation La Maison Rouge. Longplay features playlists created by artists, musicians, designers, and those in the musical community, with each playlist created following a specific brief. As part of the project, What's On The Hi-Fi created a playlist reflecting the biography of the webzine's founders.

== Artwork ==
In addition to the webzine's musical content, What's On The Hi-Fi has received recognition for its outstanding design and artwork. Much of the original artwork appearing on the website, including the webzine's distinctive banner, was created by Berlin-based and Chilean born graphic designer and illustrator Cristóbal Schmal, who often works under the moniker Nomono. Schmal has described his cultural references as including Chilean communist graphics from the '70s, engravings, German Modernism and music.

== Podcast ==
In August 2009, What's On The Hi-Fi launched a free podcast series dedicated to providing a mix of the best in new and independent music. The podcast is available for subscription on the website and on iTunes.
