= Mr. Leos caraX =

Mr Leos caraX
- Sundance film poster
- Directed by: Tessa Louise-Salomé
- Written by: Tessa Louise-Salomé; Chantal Perrin-Cluzet; Adrien Walter
- Produced by: Tessa Louise-Salomé; Chantal Perrin-Cluzet
- Cinematography: Kaname Onoyama
- Edited by: Tessa Louise-Salomé; Gabriel Humeau; Laureline Attali
- Music by: Gael Rakotondrabe
- Production companies: Petite Maison Production; ARTE France; Théo Films
- Release date: 20 January 2014 (Sundance Film Festival)
- Running time: 71 minutes
- Country: France
- Languages: English; French; Japanese

Mr Leos caraX (also known as Mr. X) is a 2014 French documentary film written, directed and produced by Tessa Louise-Salomé. The film premiered in-competition in the World Cinema Documentary Competition at 2014 Sundance Film Festival on January 20, 2014.

== Synopsis ==
The film focuses on the French filmmaker Leos Carax, his work and his reputation in cinema. Though interviews with collaborators and relatives such as Kiyoshi Kurosawa, Harmony Korine and Kylie Minogue, Mr Leos caraX explores the creative process and vision of the French director. The film uses the director’s filmography as a storyline to describe his approach to filmmaking, reinforced by insights from actors and crew members having participated to his lifework, such as Denis Lavant, Mireille Perrier and Eva Mendes.

== Reception ==
Mr Leos caraX received mixed reviews upon its premiere at the 2014 Sundance Film Festival. In his review for Variety, Guy Lodge said that "Tessa-Louise Salome's documentary is an alluring if not especially illuminating tribute to singular filmmaker Leos Carax." Boyd van Hoeij in his review for The Hollywood Reporter said that "A film that works as a reminder of Carax's unique talents, but isn't quite insightful itself." While, Kyle Burton of Indiewire praised the film by saying that "Louise-Salomé injects the film with his subject's fascinating presence, by arranging clips and overlaying images on the artificially decrepit interview sets. Still, she wisely limits the extent to which her documentary replicates Carax’s ambition."
