= God Has a Voice, She Speaks Through Me =

Single by CocoRosie
- Released: May 13, 2008
- Genre: Alternative, electronic, experimental
- Length: 4:00
- Label: Touch and Go Records
- Songwriters: Bianca Casady, Sierra Casady, Gaël Rakotondrabé
- Producer: CocoRosie

CocoRosie singles chronology
"God Has a Voice, She Speaks Through Me" (2008)	"Lemonade" (2010)

"God Has a Voice, She Speaks Through Me" is a single by American music group CocoRosie, released by Touch and Go Records on May 13, 2008. Touch and Go initially produced 3,000 pieces on vinyl, which included an untitled B-side track consisting of noises and distorted singing. On July 8, 2008, the label began releasing 7" picture disc versions of the single. Since 2012, the single has been sold only on digital platforms.

The track has been described as art pop, downtempo, electronic, rock, folk rock, indie rock, indietronica, and progressive pop. CocoRosie said the track was "the first song we recorded" for their then-upcoming album, describing it as "a dance song about suicide, spiritual ecstasy and life under the veil." Producer and composer Gaël Rakotondrabé, who was briefly a member of the group, is credited as one of the track's songwriters alongside the Casady sisters.

On May 27, 2008, the Touch and Go Records YouTube channel released a music video for the track.

== Performances ==
David Courtright of Atlanta Music Guide reviewed a September 21, 2010 performance of the track at the Variety Playhouse in Atlanta, Georgia, which he deemed "the perfect venue for [CocoRosie]." Courtright described the track a "crowd-pleaser" for the "bohemian, rather same-sex oriented" audience. Detailing the performance, the review states that the Casady sisters appeared on stage wearing "a very French ensemble... floral-patterned black stockings with runs and holes, red lips outlined in black" and a "beat-box wizard, a percussionist and a piano/synth player... [a] drum/percussion kit was encased in an antique baby's crib with fat baby painted on the side... Behind [them] was a large screen that projected every kind of bizarre psychedelic image... doll heads dripping blood and crying to orbiting paper roses, flashes of heat lightning, close ups of lion fur and mane, carousels spinning, lots of eyeballs crying and blinking, and crucifixes".

== Reception ==
The single received mixed reviews, with music website Rate Your Music giving it an average rating of 2.95 out of 5. Stereogum described it as "an instructional auto-tuning paean to Mama Nature", stating that it "offers some supreme springtime anthemics" and that "the vocal effects take a little getting used to, though almost immediately they do make it all the easier to dance". A Brassland Records article on CocoRosie described it as "outrageously disco". Amazon Music editorial reviews describe the track as having "a springtime dance floor sound", stating "CocoRosie narrates a suicide story that takes place in a tender and elated moment of innocence, focusing on releasing and returning to Mother Nature."

A 2016 interview with Bianca Casady suggested that the track was "straight-forward" and feminist, and attempted to "overtly feminiz[e] the Judeo-Christian God... only to find that the message was lost on listeners yet again." Bianca, retrospectively discussing its release, stated “I thought we were super heavy-handed... We had to start being so blatant about being feminist.” Bianca Casady has stated that the song is about women who wear the burqa and that the lyrics stem from Bianca's "being exhausted from thousands of years of a male image of god being foisted upon us. So I tried to create a more personal vision of god."
