= Legend of the Rainbow Warriors =

Story from a 1962 religious tract

Folk tale
- Name: Legend of the Rainbow Warriors
- Mythology: Hippie / New Age fakelore (usually alleged by adherents to be Cree or Hopi mythology)
- Country: United States
- Origin Date: 1962
- Published in: Warriors of the Rainbow

Since the early 1970s, a legend of Rainbow Warriors has inspired some environmentalists and hippies with a belief that their movement is the fulfillment of a Native American prophecy. Usually the "prophecy" is claimed to be Hopi or Cree. However, this "prophecy" is not Native American at all, but rather from a 1962 Evangelical Christian religious tract, titled Warriors of the Rainbow by William Willoya and Vinson Brown from Naturegraph Publishers. Brown is also the founder and owner of Naturegraph Publishers. Discussing the legend, scholar Michael Niman said, "If anything, it was an attack on Native culture. It was an attempt to evangelize within the Native American community."

== Origins ==
The modern story has been misrepresented as ancient prophecy. While this falsification may have been done consciously by the creators of the story, those who pass the story on may sincerely believe the story is authentic. This phenomenon is an example of what scholar Michael I. Niman calls "fakelore." The legend is frequently circulated by members of the counterculture group, the Rainbow Family.

While there are variations on the theme, especially as it has become popularized in Internet memes, the common thread in all versions of the story is that a time of crisis will come to the Earth, that people of many races will come together to save the planet, and it is always erroneously credited as being a Native American or First Nations prophecy. Niman adds, "It is said there will be a time when the trees are dying, blah, blah, blah. There will be a tribe of people who come and save the Earth and they will be called the Rainbows." Some modern versions of the fictitious story specifically state that this new "tribe" will inherit the ways of the Native Americans, or that Native ways will die out to be replaced by the new ways of the "Rainbow" people. In The Mystery of the Crystal Skulls, Morton and Thomas write:

The legend said [the Native Americans] would also be joined by many of their light-skinned brothers and sisters, who would in fact be the reincarnate souls of the Indians who were killed or enslaved by the first light-skinned settlers. It was said that the dead souls of these first people would return in bodies of all different colours: red, white, yellow and black. Together and unified, like the colours of the rainbow, these people would teach all of the peoples of the world how to have love and reverence for Mother Earth, of whose very stuff we human beings are also made.

Warriors of the Rainbow relates these fictitious "Indian" prophecies to the Second Coming of Christ and has been described as purveying "a covert anti-Semitism throughout, while evangelizing against traditional Native American spirituality." The tract says that the Hopi people should not make the same choice "made by the Jews two thousand years ago when they rejected their Messiah, Jesus, because he did not bring the literal power and glory they expected."

The book The Greenpeace Story, states that Greenpeace co-founder Bob Hunter was given a copy of Warriors of the Rainbow by a wandering dulcimer maker in 1969 and he passed it around on the first expedition of the Don't Make a Wave Committee, the precursor of Greenpeace. The legend inspired the name of the Greenpeace ship, Rainbow Warrior, used in environmental protection protests.

== Native American response ==
In 2015, a group of Native American academics and writers issued a statement against the Rainbow Family members who are "appropriating and practicing faux Native ceremonies and beliefs. These actions, although Rainbows may not realize, dehumanize us as an indigenous Nation because they imply our culture and humanity, like our land, is anyone's for the taking." The signatories specifically named this misappropriation as "cultural exploitation."

[A] group that cites a fictitious "Native American prophecy" as informing their self-identification as "warriors of the rainbow" and willfully appropriates Native cultural practices, is not only adventurist and dangerous, but offensive to many of us who advance and continue to defend the spiritual, the cultural, the sacred, and, most importantly, the political vitality and vision of the Oceti Sakowin.

== Popular culture ==
The track "Rainbowarriors" from the CocoRosie album The Adventures of Ghosthorse and Stillborn was partly based on the Legend of the Rainbow Warriors. The song has been criticized for "race-baiting" and "naïve and insensitive appropriation of Native American mythology."

== See also ==
- Cultural appropriation
- Invented tradition
- Medicine wheel (symbol)
- Plastic shaman
- Pretendian

== Literature ==
- Willoya, William, and Vinson Brown. Warriors of the Rainbow: Strange and Prophetic Indian Dreams. Healdsburg, California: Naturegraph, 1962.
- Dahl, Arthur. "Brown, Vinson." In Encyclopedia of Religion and Nature, edited by Bron Taylor, 227. London & New York: Continuum International, 2005.
- Deloria, Philip J. Playing Indian. New Haven: Yale University Press, 1998.
- Niman, Michael I. People of the Rainbow: A Nomadic Utopia. Nashville: University of Tennessee Press, 1997.
