= Iron Thunderhorse =

American writer-illustrator

Iron Thunderhorse is an author and prisoner in Texas. He has described himself as the "Quinnipiac Grand Sachem, Historian, Linguist, and Thunderbird Clan Shaman" and "the CEO and Legal Sovereign of ACQTC, Inc., a self-identifying tribe, and Hereditary Grand Sachem and Powwamanitomp (Shaman) of the Quinnipiac Thunder Clan". In 2018, John Nova Lomax described him as a "self-proclaimed Native American shaman".

== Ancestry and childhood ==
Iron Thunderhorse was born in New Haven, Connecticut, on January 29, 1950, as William L. Coppola. In 1989, he legally changed his name to Iron Thunderhorse. He said Biwabiko Paddaquahas was the translation in the Quinnipiac language.

Thunderhorse's mother was Norma Patricia Brown, a grand niece of Sakaskantawe (Flying Squirrel Woman). In ALGONQUIN EAGLE SONG: An Informal "Honor Roll" of Great Algonquins, Evan T. Pritchard writes, "Iron Thunderhorse is a direct descendant of Elizabeth Sakaskantawe [Mahweeyeuh/Brown] (the last matriarch of the Quinnipiac's Totoket Band) of the people of southwestern Connecticut, who were among the first ... to be driven from their land." Thunderhorse's father was an immigrant from Naples, Italy, and his stepfather was an Ojibway from Quebec, Canada.

By age 12, Thunderhorse reports he had been exposed to six languages (English, Italian, Latin, French-Canadian, Anishinabemowin, and Quiripi) by his relatives. Thunderhorse traces his passion for honoring and preserving the language and traditions of his Native American ancestor to his childhood time with Sakaskantawe. She was in her mid-90s to early 100s when she taught Thunderhorse 100 basic words of the Quiripi language, various Quiripi traditions, and the importance of learning and preserving them.

== New Age beliefs ==
Thunderhorse was a prolific, self-published New Age author. "Thunderhorse's teachings are a mishmash of Native American religion and other New Age favorites, such as Tibetan Buddhism, Taoism, and Ancient Druidism," writes anthropologist Lisa Aldred. Allegations have been made that Thunderhorse is not truly Native American.

== Incarceration ==
Thunderhorse was incarcerated by the Texas Department of Criminal Justice in 1978. In 1977, he was convicted of the charges of aggravated kidnapping, aggravated rape, aggravated robbery; and in 1991 convicted of a charge of escape. His maximum sentence was set at 99 years.

In June 2014, shortly after being paroled to a halfway house in Houston, TX, Thunderhorse pulled off his electronic monitoring anklet and fled to the New Haven, CT, area. In August 2014, when Thunderhorse attempted to use a 20-year-old ID to withdraw money from the Chase Bank in downtown New Haven, a bank employee did an internet search on him and discovered he was a fugitive from Texas and alerted local police who arrested him. Thunderhorse fought extradition to Texas, but the Supreme Court denied his claims of sovereign immunity and ordered him returned to TX in January 2015.

He was denied parole on October 13, 2022, due to his criminal history and the violent nature of his offense.

== Legal activism ==
Early in his incarceration, Thunderhorse became a certified paralegal. He served as Editor for Thunderbird Free Press (Native American tribes' and prisoners' rights), and as Briefing Editor for the Prison Law Monitor. His first published work in legal forums was Breaking the Chains (Inside/Out Press, Fresno, CA, 1983) about the history and jurisprudence of self-representation in America. He wrote exclusive columns on prison law in Easyriders, Biker Lifestyle, Iron Horse, Guild Notes, and Voice for the Defense.

Thunderhorse was active in the Ruis v. Estelle prison reform litigation as a class Plaintiff. In 1981, the presiding Judge, William Wayne Justice, appointed Vince Nathan as Special Master to monitor compliance with the court's mandates. Nathan was to study official retaliation against "jailhouse lawyers" and Thunderhorse was one of those interviewed by him at the Ellis Unit. Texas Department of Criminal Justice (TDCJ) officials declined to release Thunderhorse's central file and Nathan had to petition the Court for sanctions against TDCJ.

Thunderhorse has written columns about legislation and prison reform in the Daily Texas (UT-Austin Law School paper) and the Houston Post In 1990, Dallas Morning News reporter Mark McDonald wrote that "the state also knows Mr. Coppola [Thunderhorse] as one of the most formidable legal opponents it has ever encountered, a jailhouse Clarence Darrow, a self-taught prison lawyer of incomparable skill and persistence."

Thunderhorse also cofounded The Thunderbird Alliance, a coalition of Tribes, Medicine Societies, Support Groups, and prison circles to address the many problems faced by Native American religious adherents behind prison walls. He served as editor-in-chief for The Thunderbird Free Press, the quarterly forum for the Thunderbird Alliance. Humanity & Society, a journal of humanist sociology, published a special issue about Native American struggles and two Thunderbird Alliance Advocates (one of whom was Thunderhorse), which included an essay on the legacy of the Thunderbird Alliance, from its tribal roots.

In 2000, ECOS (the Environmental Council of Stamford) was losing a lawsuit against the cities of Stamford and Greenwich, Connecticut in an effort to save the Rosa Hartman Park and Laddin's Rock Park from becoming a golf course. ECOS requested assistance from ACQTC, Inc. and Thunderhorse filed a Motion to Intervene as the Legal Sovereign of ACQTC, Inc., and submitted an 86-page multidisciplinary study about the sites. Eventually, Attorney General Richard Blumenthal indicated he would file for a permanent injunction after Thunderhorse pointed out that the original donors of the land did so with the stipulation that the Parks be used for the public (precluding a golf course for the wealthy).

In 2003, Thunderhorse, who is now legally blind, filed a Pro Se litigation under the ADA (Americans with Disabilities Act) about the conditions in Texas prisons, because they reportedly did not adequately accommodate disabled prisoners. This led to an investigation by ADVOCACY, Inc.

In late 2004, Thunderhorse filed suit in Pro Se under the RLUIPA (Religious Land Use and Institutionalized Persons Act) after TDCJ defendants reportedly violated three previous out-of-court settlements. When the U.S. Magistrate Judge ruled against Thunderhorse, he appealed to the Fifth U.S. Circuit Court of Appeals in New Orleans. In a four-page PER CURIAM OPINION, the 5th Circuit vacated the District Court's ruling and remanded the case for "further proceedings."

== Artist ==
Thunderhorse has published a special series teaching the basics of many Native American traditional crafts. His book, Return of the Thunderbeings (by Iron Thunderhorse and Donn LeVie Jr., Santa Fe, Bear & Co., 1990, ISBN 0-939680-68-8), has chapters on Shamanic art and is full of symbols and designs used as iconography in tribal arts and crafts. All of Thunderhorse's books, booklets, and scholarly studies contain his line drawings, maps, and charts. Four of his illustrations appear in Voices of Native America and he designed the cover for his only authorized biography, Following the Footprints of a Stone Giant: The Life and Times of Iron Thunderhorse.

Thunderhorse's historical pictographic portraiture of Tecumseh is on display at the Museums at Prophetstown State Park in Lafayette, Indiana. His masks are in the private collections of Barbara Hand Clow, David Wagner, and Yehwehnode. At the Indian Trading Post and Powwow Museum, just south of Indianapolis, Indiana, many Thunderhorse originals were on display for several years. Other works have been on display in Louisville, Kentucky; New York City; Orange, Texas; and elsewhere. A permanent exhibit of Iron's maps and portraits reside at the Quinnipiac Dawnland Museum in Guilford, Connecticut, while a large collection of his work remains at the ACQTC National Office in Milltown, Indiana. At gatherings, his creations have been used as educational tools in CT, IN, NY, and Quebec, Canada. To help raise funds and awareness, he has donated paintings to groups such as the Eastern Puma Research Association in Baltimore, Maryland.

== Writing ==
Thunderhorse has written bilingual poetry in numerous Algonquian language dialects and has published many scholarly papers on linguistics in the Dawnlander, the ACQTC Literary Journal (annual). In 2000, Thunderhorse developed a 100-page Quiripi language guide. In 2006 he published a 295-page revised and expanded edition, A Complete Guide for Learning, Speaking, and Writing The PEA-A Wampano-Quiripi R-Dialect (QTC Press, ACLI Series).

=== Published works ===
- Breaking the Chains: A History of Self-Representation in America, Inside/Out Press, Fresno, CA, 1983.
- Paradox, A Psychic Journey, Abbetira Publishing, 1984. ISBN 0-913407-01-1
- Medicine Visions (Poetry chapbook), Thunderbird Free Press, 1985.
- Relocation, Crimes Against Nature, Thunderbird Free Press, 1986.
- Thunderbird Voices Speaking, Thunderbird Free Press, 1987.
- Return of the Thunderbeings, with Donn Le Vie Jr., Bear & Company, Santa Fe, NM, 1990. ISBN 0-939680-68-8
- Learning All About Suckerfish Writing: The Micmac's Glottographic Writing System, QTC Press, 2000.
- A Complete Language Guide & Primer to the Wampano/Quinnipiac R-Dialect of Southwestern New England, QTC Press, 2000.
- There's More Than Rocks, Trees, and Streams in the Woods, QTC Press, 2000.
- We the People Called Quinnipiac, QTC Press, 2001-2002 (available only in electronic format, PDF on CD, from ACQTC).

=== Articles and Columns ===
- "The Freedom Fighters" (as William "Crazy Horse" Coppola) in Easyriders Issue 102, December 1981.
- "Algonquian and Iroquoian Influence on the American System of Democracy" in TURTLE QUARTERLY, Winter 1988.
- "The Thunderbird Alliance: Reclaiming the Legacy of Tribal Democracy," Humanity & Society, 1989 (reprinted in Humanity & Society Special 25th Anniversary Issue, Part One, Volume 27, No. 3, August 2003).
- "Dreams Visions and Prophecies of the Anishinaabe" in AMERICAN INDIAN REVIEW, UK, 1992.
- "Pride, Protest, and Prejudice in the Arts" in TURTLE QUARTERLY, Fall-Winter, 1994.
- "She Who is Alone" (A Texas Indian Legend About the Bluebonnet Wildflowers), in WILD WEST, Oct. 1996.
- "The Dawnstar Carved in Stone," in NEARA JOURNAL, Volume xxxi, No. 1, Spring 1997.
- "Sharing the Good Message: The Art of Storytelling in the Poetry of Joseph Bruchac" in PAINTBRUSH, A Journal of Poetry and Translations, Truman State University, Vol. XXIV, Autumn 1997.
- "Native American Picture-Writing: A Lost Art Currently Being Revived in Indian Country," in Whispering Wind, Vol. 29, No. 1, 1998.
- Arts & Crafts Columns in Country Road Chronicles, Mar, Apr, May, June, July, Aug, and Sept of 1999.
- "The Quinnipiac of New England," in Whispering Wind, Vol. 32, No. 5, 2002.
- "Algonquian Influence on Shaping of America," in WILD WEST, June 2002.
- "Algonquian Influence on Powwow Culture," in Whispering Wind, Vol. 33, No. 3, 2003.
- Columns and Features in ANCIENT AMERICAN, Numbers 13, 14, 15, 17, 18, 19–20, 22, 23, 24, 25, 26, 27, 28, 29, 30, 31, 32, 36, 37, 43, 44, and 48.
- 100 Columns in Branford Review, Nov. 2001 through Dec. 2004.

=== Manuscripts ===
- The Complete Guide for Learning, Speaking, and Writing the PEA-A Wampano-Quiripi R-Dialect, 2006.
- Sacred Pathways of our Indian Ancestry, 2000.
- Graphical Writing Systems: An Introduction to the Study of Native American Indian Languages, 1996.
- Quinnipiac: Land Where the People, Rivers, Mountains, and Trails Converge, 1995.
- Sacred Cultural Landscapes: The Ways of Algonquian Sachemdoms – and – Implications of a Thunder Clan Shamanic Complex in Western Connecticut, 2000.

=== Further works ===
A more complete bibliography of works written by Thunderhorse (c. 1985–2005) appears on pages 94–103 of Following the Footprints of a Stone Giant: The Life and Times of Iron Thunderhorse (by Ruth Mahweeyeuh Thunderhorse, Infinity Publishing.com, 2007. ISBN 0-7414-3977-8). Some of Thunderhorse's published and unpublished works can be found at the Beineke Rare Books (Yale University) Library in New Haven, Connecticut; at the Connecticut Historical Society in Hartford, Connecticut; at the Mashantucket Pequot Research Center in Mashantucket, Connecticut; at the Center for Algonquian Culture in Woodstock, New York; and at the Quinnipiac Dawnland Museum in Guilford, Connecticut.
