= The Strange One =

1957 film by Jack Garfein

- Directed by: Jack Garfein
- Screenplay by: Calder Willingham
- Based on: End as a Man; 1947 novel and 1953 play by Calder Willingham
- Produced by: Sam Spiegel
- Starring: Ben Gazzara; Julie Wilson; Mark Richman; George Peppard; Pat Hingle; Arthur Storch; James Olson
- Cinematography: Burnett Guffey
- Edited by: Sidney M. Katz
- Music by: Kenyon Hopkins
- Color process: Black and white
- Production company: Horizon Pictures
- Distributed by: Columbia Pictures
- Release date: April 12, 1957
- Running time: 100 minutes
- Country: United States
- Language: English

The Strange One is a 1957 American film noir about students faced with an ethical dilemma in a military college in the Southern United States. It was directed by Jack Garfein, produced by Sam Spiegel, and was adapted from a novel and stage play by Calder Willingham called End as a Man. It marked the film debut of Ben Gazzara, George Peppard and Julie Wilson. Gazzara, Pat Hingle, Mark Richman and Arthur Storch reprised their roles after starring in the stage version. The film is noteworthy, due to the entire acting and technical staff being from the Actors Studio. It focuses on the dehumanization associated with the tradition of hazing within the college and is noteworthy for its portrayal of homoerotic themes – and at least one gay character – at a time when the Hays Code prohibited such expression.

== Plot ==
Cadet Staff Sergeant Jocko De Paris is a senior at the fictional Southern Military College. Using the authority of his own rank, his father's connections with the school, and the college's tradition of allowing upperclassmen to bully new cadets, De Paris effectively does what he pleases. Everyone at the school is either afraid of him or believes he is a normal or even exemplary cadet.

One night, he frames George Avery, the son of a staff member, making it appear that he got drunk and fell unconscious on the quadrangle all by himself. Cadet Avery is expelled, and De Paris sees to it that every cadet who took part in the incident lies during the investigation to conceal his own involvement. Two freshmen, along with the roommates of De Paris and the regimental commander, eventually decide to end De Paris' manipulation of them and the school. By the time De Paris is cornered in a restaurant in the nearby town, a great many cadets have banded together against him.

Laurie Corger, the regimental commander, orders him to sign a statement confessing to engineering Avery's expulsion and going to great lengths to conceal the truth from investigators. Initially reacting with smug confidence and indignant anger at being accused, De Paris finally folds and signs the statement, asking that he be allowed to leave quietly. The cadets then take him away from the restaurant and start dragging an increasingly frantic and blindfolded De Paris towards a railroad track. Instead of throwing him in front of the approaching train as he expects, they put him on board once it stops. As the train begins to move again, De Paris, having removed his blindfold, runs to the last car and rails at the watching cadets, shouting furiously, "I'll be back! I'll get you guys! You can't do this to Jocko De Paris!"

== Cast ==
- Ben Gazzara as Cadet Sgt. Jocko De Paris*
- Pat Hingle as Cadet Harold Koble
- Mark Richman as Cadet Col. Laurie Corger
- Arthur Storch as Cadet Simmons**
- Paul E. Richards as Cadet Perrin "Cockroach" McKee ***
- Larry Gates as Maj. George Avery Sr.
- Clifton James as Col. M.N. Ramsey
- Geoffrey Horne as Cadet George Avery Jr.
- James Olson as Cadet Roger Gatt
- Julie Wilson as Peonie aka "Rosebud"****
- George Peppard as Cadet Robert Marquales

== Production ==
According to director Jack Garfein, producer Sam Spiegel first approached Elia Kazan to direct the film adaptation of End as a Man. Kazan told him that the best director would be Garfein, who had directed the stage version, despite Spiegel regarding him as an inexperienced "kid".

According to Ben Gazzara, he later found out that James Dean was after his lead part, but Garfein chose to keep Gazzara along with the other cast members from the Actors Studio and the stage production. George Peppard was among the only new actors cast, along with Julie Wilson as Peonie, a new part created for the film.

Filming took place in Orlando, Florida. Spiegel was producing The Bridge on the River Kwai at the same time, and regularly flying between Ceylon (Sri Lanka) and Florida to touch base on both films. Tensions developed between Garfein and Spiegel, and Gazzara claimed that Spiegel was told to leave the set during filming one day. Spiegel later told Gazzara that he intended to fire Garfein and replace him with another director, but Gazzara refused to stand with Spiegel against Garfein, and Spiegel seemingly dropped this plan.

Garfein decided to include African American extras in the final train scene, after seeing black children sat on train floors in Florida, which reminded him of his own childhood in Nazi concentration camps. According to Garfein, Spiegel initially agreed to this, but Harry Cohn, president of Columbia Pictures, objected that the film would get no distribution in the Southern States if black people appeared onscreen (due to racial segregation). Spiegel then insisted that they be cut from the scene, despite Garfein's objections as an Auschwitz survivor. Spiegel tried to persuade Gazzara not to act in the scene with black actors, but Gazzara would not side with him against Garfein. The scene was filmed as planned, and when Spiegel came to the set to oversee it, Garfein and the crew kept the black actors hidden from sight in the bushes while Pat Hingle started a rumor that there were snakes around the set, causing Spiegel to remain in his car. Garfein refused to reshoot the scene, and Gazzara refused Spiegel's request to reshoot it with a different director.

As a result of these conflicts, Spiegel and Columbia effectively disowned the film, giving it very little promotion and distribution, according to Gazzara. Garfein's contract with Columbia was cancelled, and he blamed the fallout for his lack of success as a film director, but did not regret his decisions.

== Character notes ==
* Thomas K. Schwabacher of The Harvard Crimson described Jocko as a "sadist".

** Storch used artificial buckteeth to portray his character as ugly. He did not do this in play versions.

*** According to TCM, Perrin has an attraction to Jocko.

**** Peonie is an original character to the film.
