= La maison de mon rêve =

La Maison de Mon Rêve

Studio album by CocoRosie
- Released: March 9, 2004
- Recorded: 2003
- Genre: Lo-fi; folktronica
- Length: 40:53
- Label: Touch and Go
- Producer: CocoRosie

CocoRosie chronology
La Maison de Mon Rêve (2004)	Noah's Ark (2005)

La Maison de Mon Rêve, stylized as La maison de mon rêve (French: My dream house or the house of my dream) is the debut studio album by American musical group CocoRosie. The album was recorded in an apartment in Montmartre, Paris, France during 2003 and released by Touch and Go Records on March 9, 2004, in the United States and April 12, 2004, in the United Kingdom.

The album is characterized by its lo-fi aesthetic and experimental approach to production. It has been described as pop, indie, electronic, found sounds, folk, folk rock, blues, folk-blues, and trip hop, as well as influenced by delta blues, hip hop, and 1970s folk. The album's vocal style has been compared to the vocal styles of Billie Holiday, Fiona Apple and Nelly Furtado.

CocoRosie originally planned to make only a few copies of the album, with the intent to distribute it to friends, but were allegedly persuaded by Touch and Go Records to release it under their label. The album's cover art and layout were partially designed by musician and graphic designer Jon Beasley of Hecuba, who has toured with freak folk act Devendra Banhart who featured on CocoRosie's second album Noah's Ark. The album was mastered by Roger Seibel.

== Reception ==
Professional ratings
Review scores
Source	Rating
AllMusic	4/5 stars
Collective	4/5
Drowned in Sound	8/10
The Independent	3/5 stars
Mojo	4/5 stars
Pitchfork	6.9/10
Tiny Mix Tapes	5/5
Uncut	4/5 stars

La Maison de Mon Rêve received generally mixed reviews. Sam Ubl of Pitchfork reviewed the album one day after its release, giving it a rating of 6.9 out of 10. The mixed review described it as "an ingratiating album that suffers only from its sometimes overbearing affectation", stating that it "beams with all the lazy romanticism of an unemployed Upper East-Sider on expat life-delay" and adding that "...what CocoRosie have done with original source material on La Maison de Mon Reve is essentially what Danger Mouse attempted to do with existing music on his lauded The Grey Album ... overdubbed two styles of music, generationally-removed but deceptively similar, and the result is closer to the mean of its parts than the sum." Ubl described the album's vocals as "crooning unabashedly" and some lyrics as "doggone cringe-worthy" and "particularly guileless", but "delivered passionately enough to slide by unnoticed".

Heather Phares of AllMusic gave the album 4 out of 5 stars, describing it as "an enchanting debut" and "a dreamy yet challenging confection of found sounds, folk-blues, trip-hop, girlish pop, and experimental recording and production techniques."

Amazon Music editorial reviews describe the album as "deceptively innocent; enchanting and sweet yet eerie and twisted", deeming it "a haze of cryptic sounds and perversely angelic voices."

The highly controversial track "Jesus Loves Me" has been widely characterized as racist, due to Sierra Casady's use of the N-word six times during the song. Sierra later claimed she found it "shocking" that anyone would find the song offensive. Bianca defended the use of the racial slur in 2016, saying that art should "not always be politically correct" and that as a writer she believes it is important to explore multiple perspectives, including "the racist perspective."

== Track listing ==
All tracks are written by CocoRosie.

No.	Title	Length
1.	"Terrible Angels"	4:10
2.	"By Your Side"	3:59
3.	"Jesus Loves Me"	3:10
4.	"Good Friday"	4:23
5.	"Not for Sale"	1:19
6.	"Tahiti Rain Song"	3:36
7.	"CandyLand"	2:56
8.	"Butterscotch"	3:08
9.	"West Side"	1:24
10.	"Madonna"	3:49
11.	"Haitian Love Songs"	4:55
12.	"Lyla"	4:04

Australian edition (2007) bonus track
No.	Title	Length
13.	"Beautiful Boyz"

== Personnel ==
Credits adapted from liner notes.

- CocoRosie – production, recording, design, layout
- Roger Seibel – mastering
- Jon Beasley – layout
