= Grey Oceans =

Studio album by CocoRosie
- Released: April 30, 2010
- Genre: Freak folk; art pop
- Length: 46:23
- Label: Sub Pop
- Producer: CocoRosie; Dave Sitek

CocoRosie chronology
The Adventures of Ghosthorse and Stillborn (2007)	Grey Oceans (2010)	Tales of a GrassWidow (2013)

Alternative cover
- Vinyl edition cover

Grey Oceans is the fourth studio album by American musical group CocoRosie. It was released by Sub Pop Records on May 3, 2010 in the United Kingdom and on May 11, 2010 elsewhere.

== Background ==
In 2008, CocoRosie began work on a follow-up to their third studio album, The Adventures of Ghosthorse and Stillborn, released in 2007. During 2008 and 2009, the group wrote and recorded music in several locations, including Buenos Aires, Melbourne, Berlin, New York, and Paris, collaborating with other musicians in the process. Much of the music the group had created during the time would become Grey Oceans, a body of work which they aimed to release in 2010 as their fourth studio album.

On February 14, 2010, upon the announcement of the upcoming release of Grey Oceans, it was also announced that CocoRosie was no longer signed to independent record label Touch and Go Records, on which the group had released their previous three records, and had signed to Sub Pop Records. The final version of the album was recorded in five different countries.

The song "Undertaker" includes a recording of their mother Christina Chalmers singing the lyrics of what Bianca Casady has claimed was a "Cherokee folk song". In a 2010 interview, the Casadys said they didn't know what the lyrics meant and that Chalmers couldn't remember where she found them. The lyrics are from a Cherokee translation of "Amazing Grace".

== Critical reception ==
Professional ratings
Aggregate scores
Source	Rating
Metacritic	60/100
Review scores
Source	Rating
AllMusic	3/5 stars
The A.V. Club	C+
Beats Per Minute	67%
Filter	83%
MusicOMH	4/5 stars
NME	7/10
Pitchfork	5.1/10
Slant Magazine	2/5 stars
The Skinny	4/5 stars
URB	3.5/5 stars

Grey Oceans received mixed reviews, with many critics suggesting that the album's positive qualities are at times overshadowed by its negative qualities.

Ian Cohen of Pitchfork stated, in a review dubbing CocoRosie "one of the world's biggest cult acts", that the group seemed "more grounded" on Grey Oceans than in their previous work, noting the lack of "some of [CocoRosie's] pricklier affectations", such as "half-raps and genre exercises", and comparing the music to that of Anohni, Devendra Banhart and Joanna Newsom. Cohen praised certain moments of the album, such as the track "Trinity's Crying" ("a sort of Matrix-y new age tenor"), the "nice contrast" between the "vaudeville hook" and "jungle-esque rhythm" of the track "Hopscotch", and the "satisfying horn section" of the track "Lemonade", but opined that overall "too much of Grey Oceans is as murky and impenetrable as its title", concluding that the album is, for worse, the group's "least abrasive record to date".

Louis Pattison, in a review for BBC Online, stated that Bianca Casady's vocal style, which he described as "a child-like coo that doesn't totally irritate, but doesn't really connect" fails to enhance the "largely laidback" album, even as "jaunty ragtime piano … or moody, hip hop-inherited boom-boom-clap beats" accompany it. Robert Ferguson of Drowned in Sound, in a review assigning the album a rating of 6 out of 10, described Grey Oceans as a "mixed bag of a record" in which the "standout moments" of certain tracks "stick in the mind, but … sound very much isolated by the [poor] quality of the songs surrounding them", adding that many tracks "are decent songs, but nothing more" and that "it’s hard to know what to think of [Grey Oceans], apart from being slightly underwhelmed". In contrast, Lauren Mayberry of The Skinny, in a review assigning the album a rating of 4 out of 5 stars, described Grey Oceans as "characteristically enchanting and delightfully weird", praising the Casady sisters' "ethereal vocals" (which "weave around spoken word sections, eastern percussion, jazz piano and children's toys – complemented by harps and slithering strings"), comparing it to that of Icelandic musician Björk.

Metacritic, which assigns a weighted average score out of 100 to reviews from mainstream critics, gave the album an average score of 60, based on 21 reviews. Music webzine The Line of Best Fit named Grey Oceans the 47th best album of 2010.

=== Album art ===
Around the time of release, a common point of criticism towards Grey Oceans was the album's cover art.

In a review for BBC Online, Louis Pattison stated that "those who make it into Grey Oceans … will first have to make it past the cover", describing the album cover as "a quite horrible concoction featuring energy crystals, faux-facial hair, and some of the worst typography ever to grace a record sleeve". Sam Shepherd, in a review for MusicOMH, added that the album cover "is quite possibly the worst artwork to grace a record since Black Sabbath's Born Again (1983), or Rod Stewart's An Old Raincoat Won’t Ever Let You Down (1969)", stating that it serves "as a forewarning of the weird world of CocoRosie".

== Track listing ==
All tracks are written by Sierra Rose Casady, Bianca Leilani Casady and Gaël Alfred Rakotondrabé, former member of the group.

No.	Title	Length
1.	"Trinity's Crying"	4:40
2.	"Smokey Taboo"	4:44
3.	"Hopscotch"	3:05
4.	"Undertaker"	3:48
5.	"Grey Oceans"	4:28
6.	"R.I.P. Burn Face"	4:34
7.	"The Moon Asked the Crow"	3:46
8.	"Lemonade"	5:10
9.	"Gallows"	4:25
10.	"Fairy Paradise"	4:18
11.	"Here I Come"	3:25
Total length:		46:23

Japanese edition bonus tracks
No.	Title	Length
12.	"Surfer Girl"	4:17
13.	"St. Michael"	4:06
Total length:		54:46

== Personnel ==
Credits adapted from liner notes.

- CocoRosie – lyrics, music, production
- Gael Rakotondrabe – piano, keyboards
- Gustavo "Bolsa" Gonzalez – drums (3)
- Christina Chalmers – vocals (4)
- Martin Pantirer – bass clarinet (4, 7), alto saxophone (4, 7)
- Neda Sanai – vocals (6)
- Dave Sitek – production (6, 8, 10)
- Todd Simon – trumpet (8)
- Florence Fritz – violin (9), vocals (9)
- Nico Kalwill – engineering, mixing
- Zephyrus Sowers – additional engineering (6, 8, 10)
- Matt Greene – cover photography
- David Babbitt – layout

== Charts ==
Chart	Peak position
Austrian Albums (Ö3 Austria)	68
Belgian Albums (Ultratop Flanders)	49
Belgian Albums (Ultratop Wallonia)	59
French Albums (SNEP)	24
German Albums (Offizielle Top 100)	96
Swiss Albums (Schweizer Hitparade)	43
