= Foster Hirsch =

American film historian

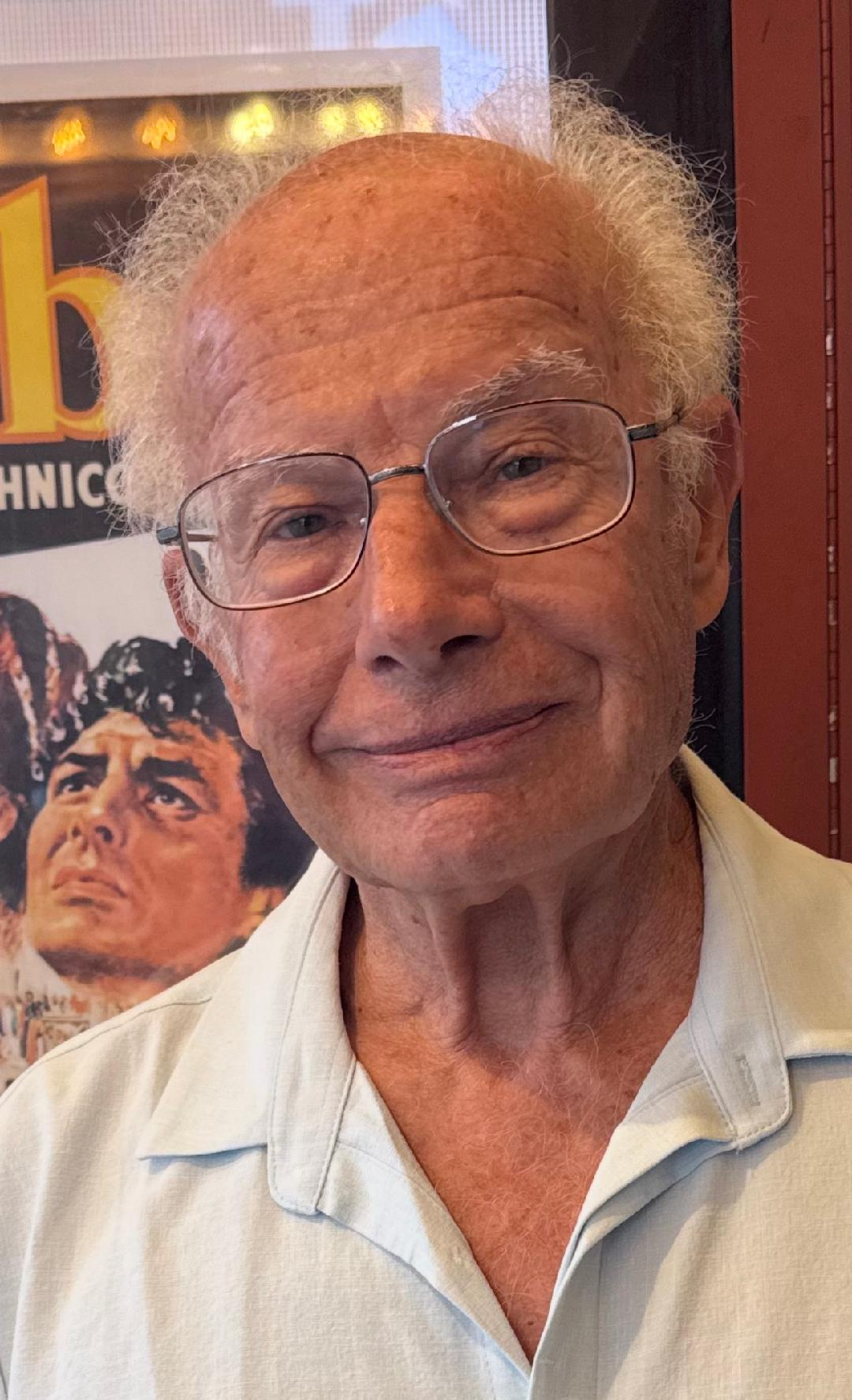
Hirsch in 2026.

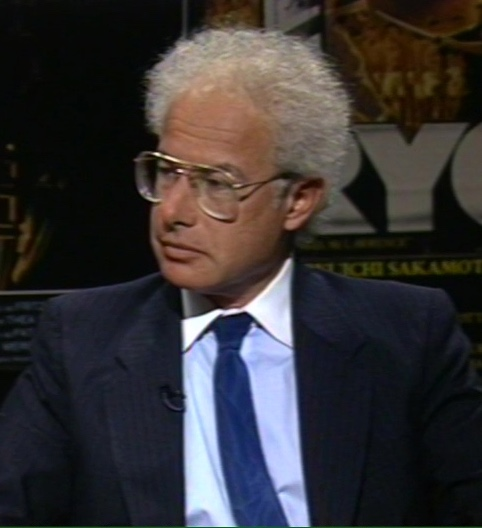
Hirsch on CUNY TV's Cinema Then, Cinema Now (1991)

Foster Hirsch is an American author and professor. He is the author of 16 books on subjects related to theatre and film. A native of California, Hirsch received his B.A. from Stanford University and holds M.F.A, M.A. and Ph.D. degrees from Columbia University. Hirsch joined the English department of Brooklyn College in 1967, and in 1973 became one of the first professors to join the school's newly established film department. He has also been associated with the Pine Bluff Film Festival since its inception in 1994.

== Selected books ==
- The Hollywood Epic (1979)
- Film Noir: The Dark Side of the Screen (Da Capo Press, 1981)
- A Method to Their Madness: The History of the Actors Studio (W. W. Norton, 1984)
- Harold Prince and the American Musical Theatre (Cambridge University Press, 1989)
- Acting Hollywood Style (Harry N. Abrams, 1991)
- Film as Film by V.F. Perkins (1972), new introduction by Foster Hirsch (Da Capo, 1993)
- The Boys from Syracuse: The Shuberts' Theatrical Empire Southern Illinois University Press, 1998
- Detours and Lost Highways: A Map of Neo-Noir (Limelight Editions, 1999)
- Love, Sex, Death and the Meaning of Life: The Films of Woody Allen (Da Capo Press, 2001)
- Kurt Weill – On Stage: From Berlin to Broadway (Alfred A. Knopf, 2001)
- Otto Preminger: The Man Who Would Be King (2007)
- Hollywood and the Movies of the Fifties (Alfred A. Knopf, 2023)
