= Masque d'Or =

The Masque d'Or (Golden Mask) is a prize awarded in France every four years by the Fédération Nationale des Compagnies de Théâtre amateur et d'Animation (National Federation of Amateur theatre and Animation Companies) for the best amateur theatre show of the season.

Established in 1982, the Masque d'Or – Grand Prix (Grand Prize) is jointly organized by the FNCTA and the Charles Dullin Association in Savoie, France.
