= Aérea Negrot =

Venezuelan electronic musician (1980–2023)

Aerea Negrot
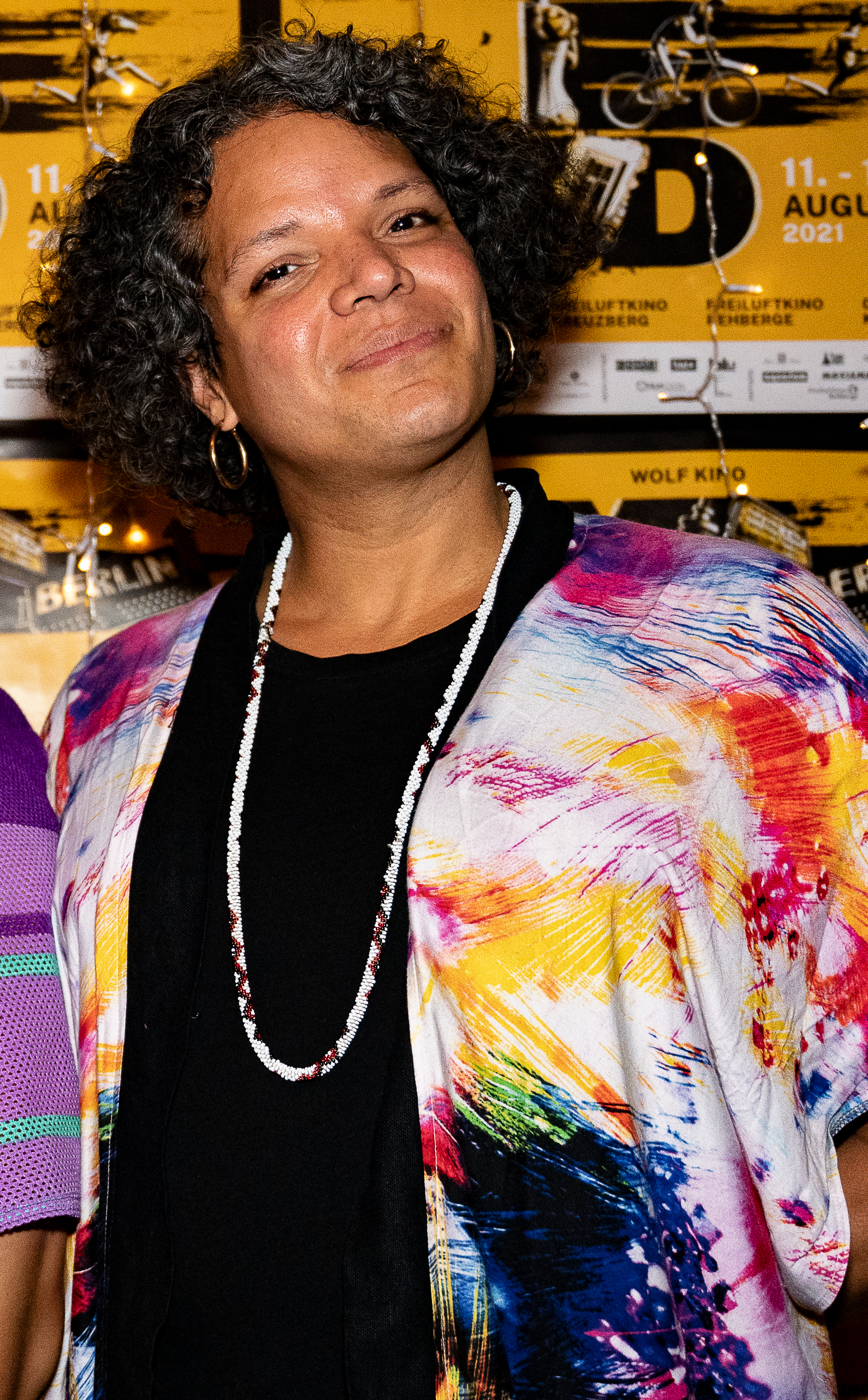
- Aérea Negrot, 2011

Background information
- Also known as: Danielle Taboga
- Born: October 9, 1980; Caracas, Venezuela
- Died: 11 October 2023 (aged 43) Berlin, Germany
- Genres: Pop, electronic, house, dance, disco
- Occupation: Singer-songwriter
- Instrument: Vocals
- Years active: 2005–2023
- Label: BPitch Control

Aérea Negrot (9 October 1980 – 11 October 2023) was a Venezuelan performer, singer, electronic musician and remixer.

Negrot lived in Berlin, Germany. Her name was inspired by her fascination with travels and planes and her admiration of the voices of Toña La Negra and Olga Guillot. Her music is a pastiche of electronica, techno, cabaret and pop. She was also part of Hercules & Love Affair, and sings on several tracks of their second album Blue Songs. Her debut album, Arabxilla (2011), was released on BPitch Control.

She was an actress in queer films directed by Shu Lea Cheang (Fluidø), Yony Leyser (Desire Will Set You Free), Simon(è) Jaikiriuma Paetau and Thais Guisasola (The Whisper of the Jaguar).

She also appeared in the web-series Creeps from the Middle East (episode: The Casting),.

Negrot died by suicide on 11 October 2023, at the age of 43.

== Discography ==
=== EPs/singles ===
- 2010 – "All I Wanna Do" (Bpitch Control) additional remixes by Efdemin and tobias.
- 2011 – "Right Body Wrong Time" (Bpitch Control)
- 2011 – "It's Lover, Love" (Bpitch Control) additional remixes by Villalobos, Philip Bader, Kiki, Fata Kiefer and Dance Disorder.

=== Remixes ===
- 2011 – Shaun J. Wright – "Forever More" (Aérea Negrot Remix) (Mr. INTL)
- 2015 - Mamacita - "Luz" (Aérea Negrot Remix) (Klack 001)

=== Compilations ===
- 2004 – V.V.A.A. – FEA Versión Dosmilcuatro include LaFamiliaFeliz feat. Aérea Negrot – La Disco (Sinnamon Records)
- 2010 – Ellen Allien – Watergate 05 include All I Wanna Do (Watergate Records)
- 2010 – V.V.A.A. – Ich Bin Ein Berliner include Ich Bin Dein Mädchen (Araknid Records)
- 2010 – V.V.A.A. – Saturator 4xuRODZINY include Ich Bin Dein Mädchen (Saturator)
- 2011 – V.V.A.A. – Werkschau include Deutsche Werden (Bpitch Control)
- 2011 – V.V.A.A. – Groove 132 / CD 41 include Arabxilla (Groove)
- 2011 – V.V.A.A. – Spex No. 99 include Berlin (Spex Magazine)

=== Vocals/collaborations ===
- 2009 – Massimiliano Pagliara – Sensation 9 (Original Mix) (Rush Hour Recordings)
- 2010 – Hercules And Love Affair – Blue Songs (Moshi Moshi Records)
- 2010 - Rey Morales ft Aerea Negrot - Angel Negro
- 2011 – tobias. – Leaning Over Backwards (Ostgut Ton)
- 2014 – Billie Ray Martin & Aerea Negrot – Off The Rails -Electrosexual Remix (Disco Activisto)
