= Blue Songs =

Blue Songs may refer to:

- Blue Songs (album), a 2011 album by Hercules and Love Affair
- Blue Songs (film), a 1929 Paramount musical short film starring Ruth Etting
