= White Horse (Jessica 6 song) =

Single by Jessica 6

from the album See the Light
- Released: January 7, 2011
- Genre: Disco, house, funk, nu-disco
- Length: 4:59
- Label: Peacefrog Records
- Songwriter(s): Noel Gonzales, Jim Orso, Andrew Raposo, Morgan Wiley

Jessica 6 singles chronology
"Fun Girl" (2009)	"White Horse" (2011)	"Prisoner of Love" (2011)

Music video
- "White Horse" on YouTube

"White Horse" is a song performed by the Brooklyn-based trio Jessica 6, taken from their debut album See the Light. It was released in January 2011, as the album's second single by Peacefrog Records. The song was featured in the campaign film for the Mugler menswear collection for Spring/Summer 2012 titled "Brothers of Arcadia."

== Composition ==
"White Horse" is an uptempo disco-pop song with house and funk influences. According to David Welsh of musicOMH, the song's disco influences thud into "Donna Summer-esque retro-styled glory."

== Critical reception ==
"White Horse" received positive reviews from music critics. In a review for The Guardian, Michael Cragg felt that the song creates a "fresh take on 70s disco and filtered house with a dash of funk. But while Hercules & Love Affair sound like they now lack a distinctive vocalist, Jessica 6 are elevated by Ruiz's smoky, melancholic voice." Likewise, Robin Murray of Clash noticed a "definite pop touch, but that doesn’t discredit some fantastic production."

== Music video ==
The music video for "White Horse" was directed by Marco Avando and aided by Ava Sanjurjo. Nomi Ruiz explained in an interview with Brightest Young Things, the main idea behind the music video of "White Horse." She said that the video "started off with a biker theme. Once Ava Sanjurjo came in as stylist along with Marco and I, it really took its own shape. It was all very improvised but wound up paying homage to NY and night life." The video premiered on Perez Hilton's website on 28 February 2011.

== Live performances ==
Jessica 6 performed "White Horse" at the Greek MAD Video Music Awards on 14 June 2011.

== Track listing ==
- Digital download
1. "White Horse" – 5:02
2. "Pressed" – 6:11
- Digital download (Remixes)
1. "White Horse" – 4:59
2. "White Horse" (Radio Edit) – 3:34
3. "White Horse" (Tee's Inbox Remix) – 5:42

== Charts ==
Chart (2011)	Peak Position
Belgium (Ultratip Wallonia)	34
Belgium Dance (Ultratop)	36

== Release history ==
Country	Date	Format	Label
United Kingdom	7 January 2011	12" single	Peacefrog Records
United States	17 April 2011	Digital download	Peacefrog Records
Belgium	16 May 2011	Promo CD single	V2 Records
United States	31 May 2011	Digital download (Remixes)	Peacefrog Records
