= The Feast of the Broken Heart =

2014 studio album by Hercules and Love Affair

Studio album by Hercules and Love Affair
- Released: May 26, 2014
- Genre: House
- Length: 44:08
- Label: Moshi Moshi
- Producers: Andrew Butler; Ha-Ze Factory; Mark Pistel

Hercules and Love Affair chronology
Blue Songs (2011)	The Feast of the Broken Heart (2014)	Omnion (2017)

Professional ratings
Aggregate scores
Source	Rating
AnyDecentMusic?	6.9/10
Metacritic	73/100
Review scores
Source	Rating
AllMusic	4/5 stars
The A.V. Club	B
Clash	8/10
Drowned in Sound	7/10
The Guardian	4/5 stars
musicOMH	4/5 stars
NME	7/10
Pitchfork	7.6/10
Slant Magazine	3.5/5 stars
Spin	8/10

The Feast of the Broken Heart is the third studio album by dance music group Hercules and Love Affair, released on May 26, 2014, by Moshi Moshi Records internationally and the following day in the United States by Big Beat Records and Atlantic Records.

== Critical reception ==
AllMusic's Andy Kellman and The Guardian's Lanre Bakare rated the album four out of five stars.

Rob LeDonne of T magazine called it "a subtle stylistic departure from Butler's earlier releases."

== Track listing ==
No.	Title	Writer(s)	Length
1.	"Hercules Theme 2014"	Andrew Butler; Gustaph; Rouge Mary	2:58
2.	"My Offence"	Butler; Krystle Warren	4:04
3.	"I Try to Talk to You"	Butler; John Grant	4:12
4.	"That's Not Me (feat. Gustaph)"	Butler; Gustaph	4:10
5.	"Think"	Butler; Mary	3:36
6.	"5:43 to Freedom"	Butler; Mary	5:43
7.	"The Light"	Butler	5:22
8.	"Liberty"	Butler; Grant; Gustaph	4:42
9.	"Do You Feel the Same? (feat. Gustaph)"	Butler; Gustaph	4:42
10.	"The Key"	Butler; Mary	4:39

== Personnel ==
Credits adapted from the liner notes of The Feast of the Broken Heart.

- Gustaph – vocals (tracks 1, 4, 9); additional keys (track 9)
- Rouge Mary – vocals (tracks 1, 5, 10)
- Krystle Warren – vocals (tracks 2, 7)
- John Grant – vocals (tracks 3, 8); additional keys (track 3)
- Gus Hoffman – trombone (track 10)
- Andrew Butler – production
- Ha-Ze Factory – production, engineering, mixing
- Mark Pistel – production (track 7)
- Benjamin Alexander Huseby – photography (group shot)
- Alexander Nussbaumer – portraits, design
- Marianne Vlaschits – artwork

== Charts ==
Chart performance for The Feast of the Broken Heart
Chart (2014)	Peak position
Belgian Albums (Ultratop Flanders)	72
Belgian Albums (Ultratop Wallonia)	110
UK Albums (Official Charts)	110
UK Dance Albums (Official Charts)	18
UK Independent Albums (Official Charts)	16
