= Jessica 6 (band) =

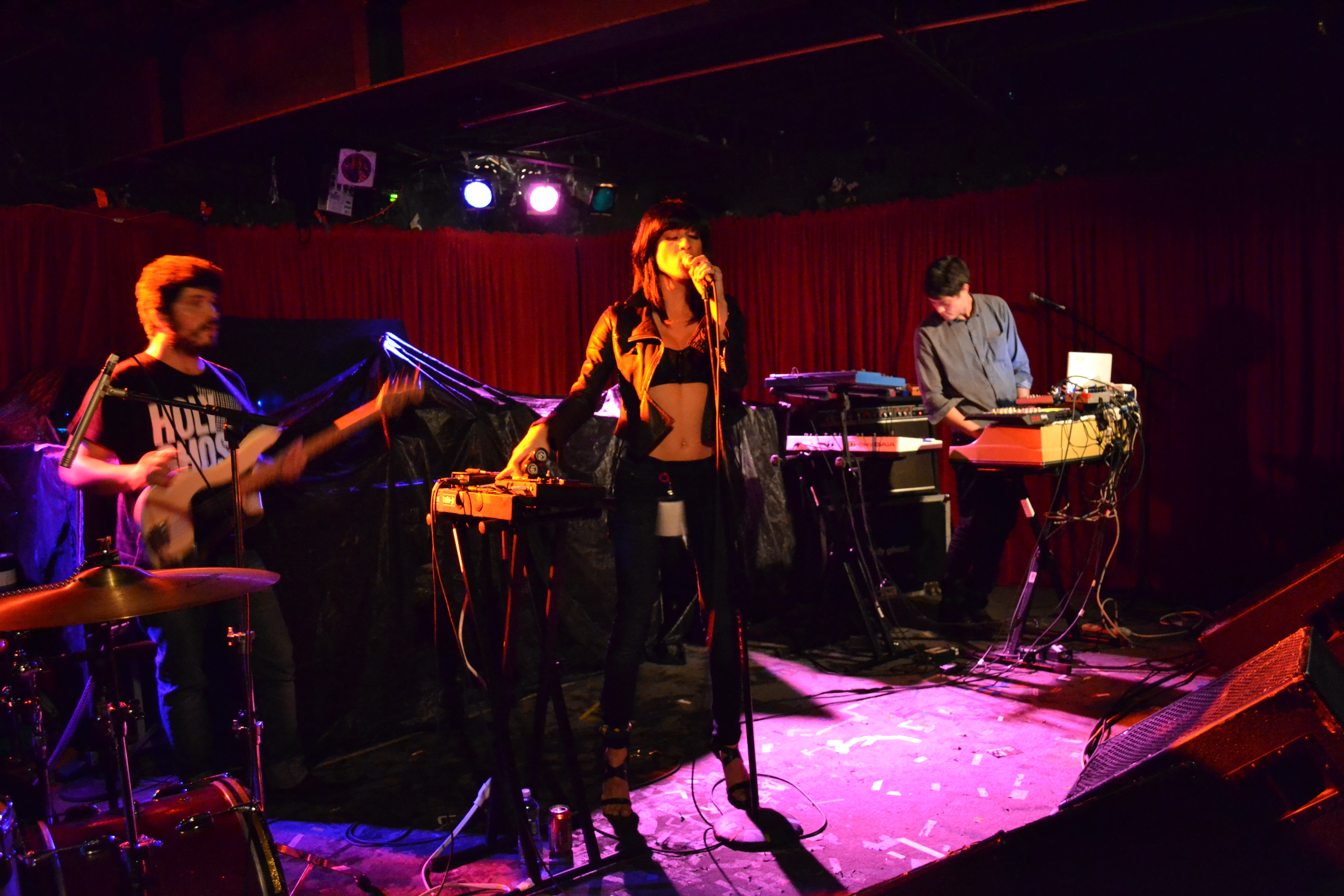
- Jessica 6 performing at the Grog Shop in Cleveland Heights, OH in 2011

Background information
- Also known as: Deep Red
- Origin: Brooklyn, New York City, United States
- Genres: Disco, house, nu-disco
- Years active: 2008-present
- Labels: Mignight Sun Sound (2009), Peacefrog Records (2011–present)
- Members: Nomi Ruiz; Andrew Raposo; Morgan Wiley
- Website: http://peacefrog.com/artists/jessica-6

Jessica 6 is the electronic pop performing alias of Nomi Ruiz which began as a Brooklyn-based Nu-disco and R&B trio that formed after helping put together the Hercules and Love Affair live show. Formerly known as Deep Red, their name was taken from the lead character of the same name from the 1967 novel Logan's Run.

== History ==
Nomi Ruiz first met Andrew Raposo and Morgan Wiley in late 2007 after they helped put together the Hercules and Love Affair live show, but didn't form the band until 2008. The band's bassist Andrew Raposo stated that the band formed after “Nomi [Ruiz] brought over a kick-pattern and a song she’d written called ‘Fun Girl.'” Raposo first met Wiley in college before joining the now defunct DFA produced hip-hop act Automato together. The single "Fun Girl" was later released in October 2009 through the label Midnight Sun Sound.

In 2010, Jessica 6 added drummer Jim Orso to the band, and also contributed a cover of David Bowie's "I'm Deranged" to the tribute album We Were So Turned On: A Tribute to David Bowie.

After signing to Peacefrog Records, Jessica 6 released the single "White Horse" on 7 January 2011. The music video for the song premiered on Perez Hilton's website on 28 February 2011. "White Horse" was released as a free download on RCRD LBL. "White Horse" became a minor hit in Belgium, peaking at number 34 on the Belgian Wallonia Ultratip Chart. To promote the album See the Light, Jessica 6 also released a limited edition vinyl of the song "Prisoner of Love." "Prisoner of Love" features Hercules and Love Affair collaborator Antony Hegarty and was featured on Pitchfork Media.

Their debut album See the Light was released on 6 June 2011. The album received positive reviews from contemporary critics, earning an average score of 66/100 on the music review aggregation of Metacritic. To coincide with the album's release, Jessica 6 released a free download of the song "East West Funk" on RCRD LBL.

== Artistry ==
Jessica 6 has been influenced by Vanity 6, Apollonia 6, and Britney Spears circa Blackout. Their music is described by Allmusic as a "mix of R&B, disco, and hip-hop -- along with healthy doses of freestyle, funk, punk, and pop." Jessica 6 also identified Cuban-mafia fashion, the works of Dario Argento, and camp themes as sources of inspiration for the band's fashion and visuals.

== Band members ==
- Nomi Ruiz – vocals (2008–present)
- Andrew Rapasso – bass guitar (2008–2013)
- Morgan Wiley – keyboards (2008–2013)
- Jim Orso - drums (2010-2013)

== Discography ==
=== Albums ===
- See the Light (2011)
- The Capricorn (2015)
- The ELIOT Sessions (2018)

=== Singles ===
- "Fun Girl" (2009)
- "White Horse" (2011) Belgian Wallonia Ultratip Chart #34, Belgian Dance Chart #36
- "Prisoner of Love" (2011)
- "In the Heat" (2012)
- "Can't Tear Us Apart" (2015)

=== Music videos ===
Year	Album	Video	Director(s)	Link
2009	See the Light	"Fun Girl"	Bijoux Altamirano	Video on YouTube
2011	See the Light	"White Horse"	Marco Ovando	Video on YouTube
2011	See the Light	"Prisoner of Love"	Marco Ovando	Video on YouTube
2015	The Capricorn	"Down Low"	Gabriel Magdaleno	Video on YouTube
2015	The Capricorn	"Can't Tear Us Apart"	Gabriel Magdaleno	Video on YouTube
2018	The ELIOT Sessions	"The Storm Inside"	Juampi Mejias	Video on YouTube
