= See the Light =

See the Light may refer to:

== Albums ==
- See the Light (The Jeff Healey Band album), released in 1988
- See the Light (Bo Bice album), released in 2007
- See the Light (The Hours album), released in 2009
- See the Light (Less Than Jake album), released in 2013
- See the Light (Jessica 6 album), released 2011

== Songs ==
- "See the Light", a song by DJ Kay Slay from More Than Just a DJ, 2010
- "See the Light", a song by Ghost from Prequelle, 2018
- "See the Light", a song by Green Day from 21st Century Breakdown, 2009
- "See the Light", a song by Stephen Sanchez from Easy on My Eyes, 2022
- "See the Lights", a song by Simple Minds from Real Life, 1991
- "See the Light", a song by the Jeff Healey Band from the album of the same name, 1988
