= Nomi Ruiz =

American singer and songwriter

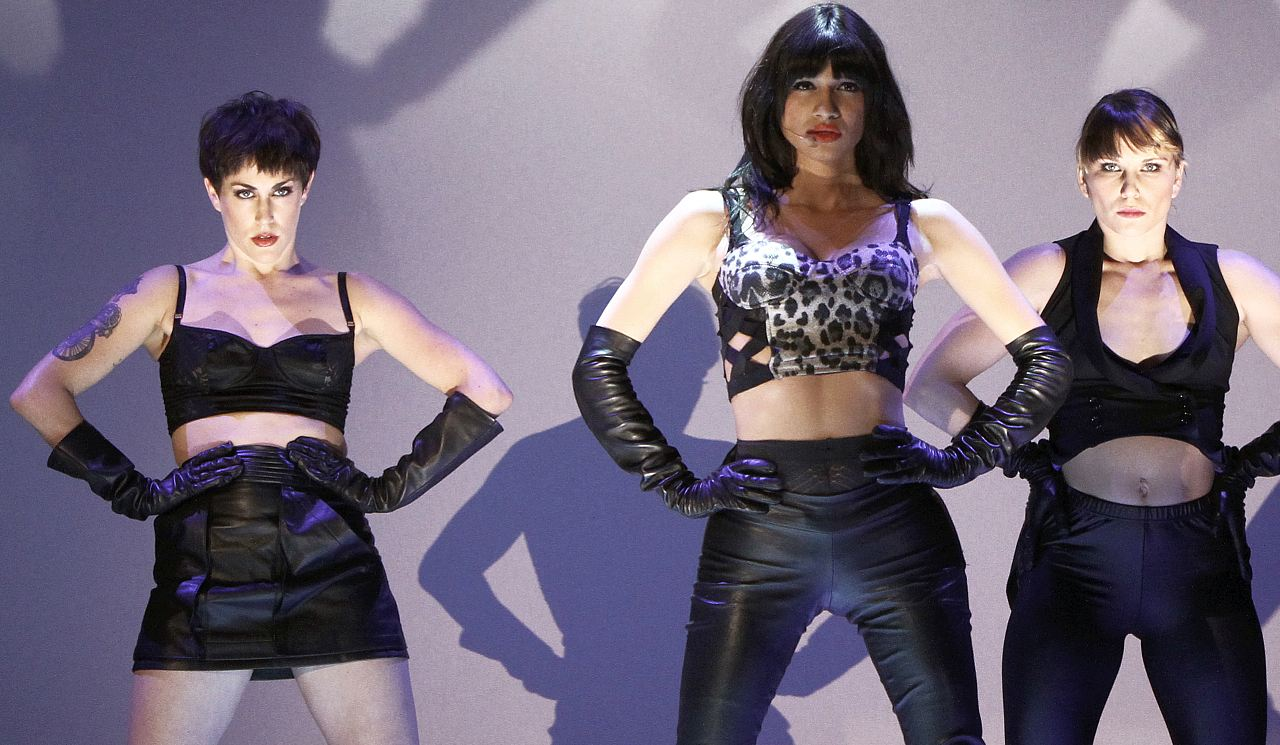
- Ruiz (middle) performing with Jessica 6 in April 2012

Background information
- Born: Brooklyn, New York, U.S.
- Genres: R&B; hip hop; house; dance-punk; nu-disco
- Occupations: Singer; songwriter; actress; essayist; producer
- Instruments: Vocals; guitar
- Years active: 2005–present
- Labels: Park Side Records; Keinemusik; DFA; Peacefrog Records; Manimal Vinyl; Midnight Sun Sound
- Website: www.nomiruiz.com

Nomi Ruiz is an American singer, songwriter, actress, essayist, DJ and producer, who is known for her work as Jessica 6. She is also known for voicing Tabi Ramirez in Primos.

== Early life ==
Ruiz was born in 1986 in the Brooklyn borough of New York City. Her parents are of Puerto Rican descent.

== Career ==
=== Lost in Lust ===
In 2005, Ruiz released her debut album Lost in Lust on her own independent label Park Side Records. The album is a song-oriented downbeat electronic album steeped in the grittier ends of early-1990s hip-hop and R&B production. After its release, she toured with CocoRosie, Debbie Harry and Antony & The Johnsons as part of their "Turning" project and Turning.

=== Hercules and Love Affair ===
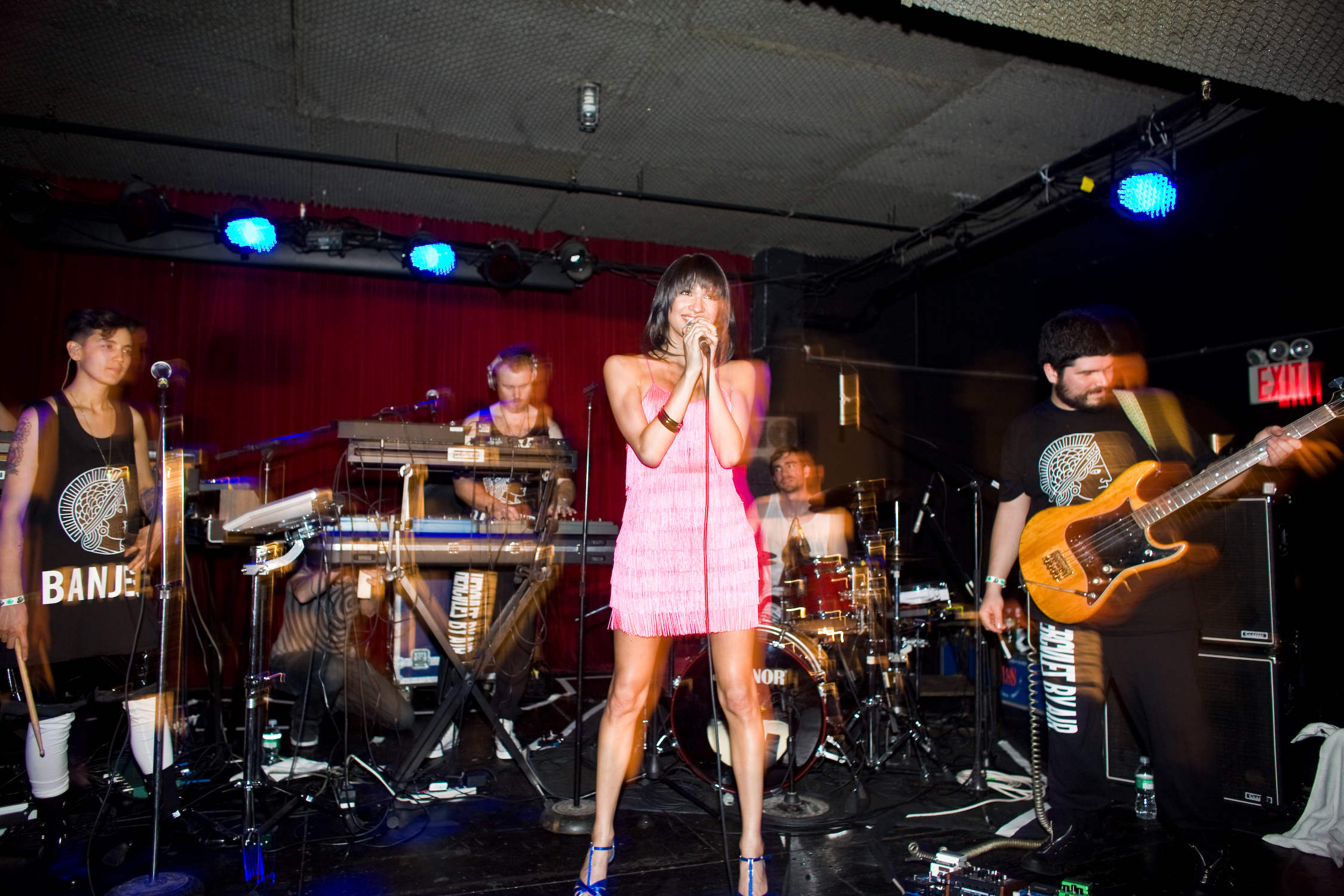
Ruiz performing with Hercules and Love Affair at Studio B in May 2008

In 2008, Ruiz appeared on the nu-disco band Hercules and Love Affair's self-titled debut album released on James Murphy's label DFA Records. She was featured on the single "You Belong" and appeared in the music video. Slant Magazine placed "You Belong" at number nine on its "Top 25 Singles of 2008" list and the song was used in the pilot episode of the TV show How to Make It in America.

Ruiz also featured on and co-wrote "Hercules Theme", which Pitchfork placed at number 21 on its list of "The 100 Best Tracks of 2008".

The band made its live debut on May 17, 2008, at the Studio B venue in Brooklyn, New York, before going on a European and North American tour, where Ruiz sang her contributions as well as those of Anohni, making her the first latinx transgender woman to perform on prestigious stages and festivals such as Switzerland's Montreax Jazz Festival, England's Glastonbury, Lovebox, O2 Arena, New York's Hammerstein Ballroom and many more.

The Guardian described Ruiz as "boasting the spookily effortless air of a future pop icon." In 2009 Ruiz quit the band and formed the group Jessica 6.

=== Jessica 6 ===
In 2009 Ruiz formed the group Jessica 6 with Andrew Raposo (of Automato) and Morgan Wiley. The band met in late 2007 after they helped put together the Hercules and Love Affair live show. Jessica 6 released their debut single "Fun Girl" on May 21, 2009, on the label Midnight Sun Sound. In 2011 they released See The Light an album that combined dance with her natural R&B/soul stylings released by Peacefrog Records.

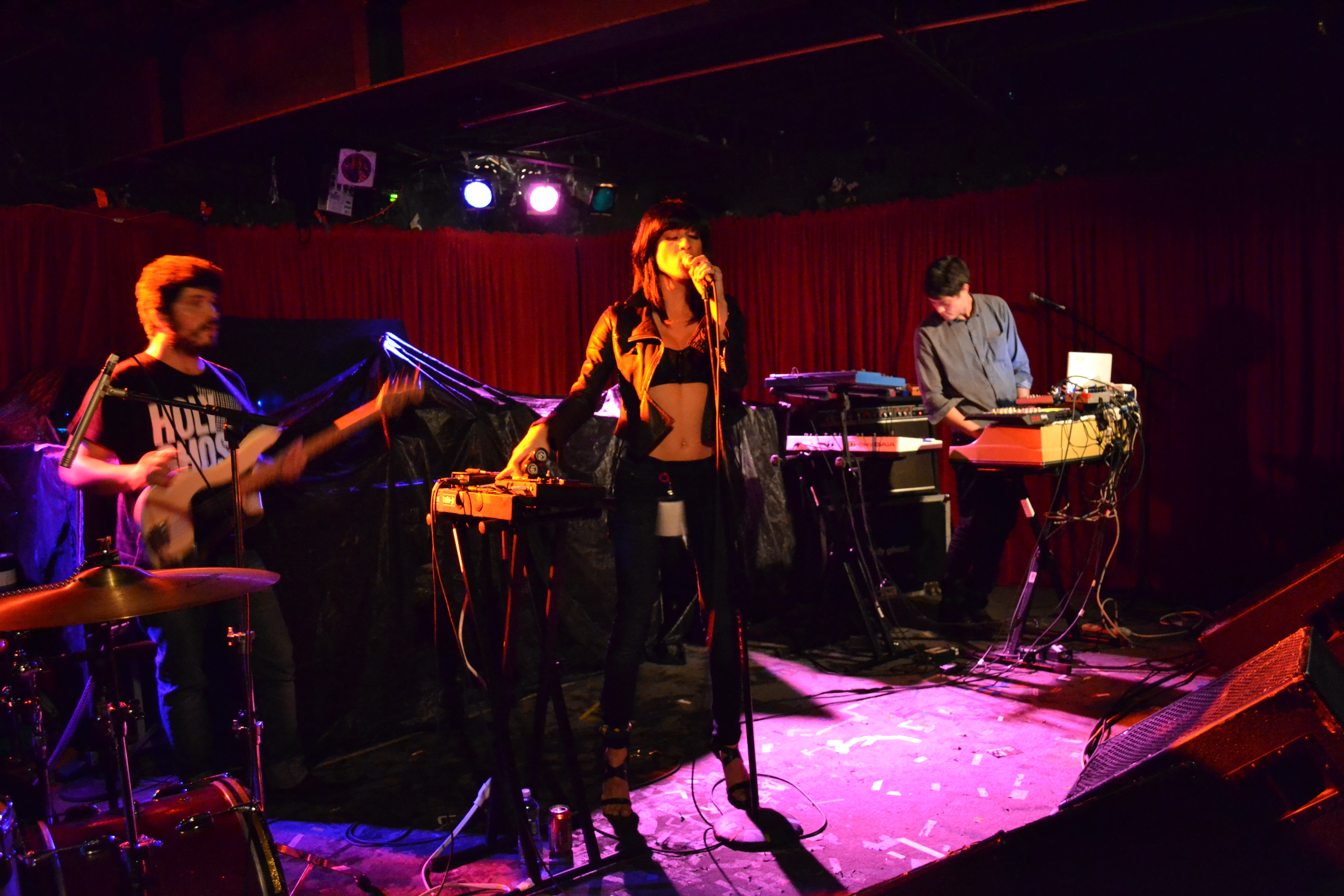

On January 7, 2011 Jessica 6 released its second single White Horse The song's music video directed by Marco Ovando premiered on February 28, 2011, on Perez Hilton's website. The video received over two million views on YouTube and received positive reviews from music critics. In a review for The Guardian, Michael Cragg felt that the song creates a "fresh take on 70s disco and filtered house with a dash of funk. But while Hercules & Love Affair sound like they now lack a distinctive vocalist, Jessica 6 are elevated by Ruiz's smoky, melancholic voice." Likewise, Robin Murray of Clash noticed a "definite pop touch, but that doesn't discredit some fantastic production." The album's critical acclaim further solidified her status as a history making global artist, at the Greek MAD Video Music Awards on June 14, 2011, Berlin's Tempodrom, London's prestigious Royal Albert Hall, Tate Modern and making an appearance at Chile's Vina del Mar Festival where she appeared with Chilean actress Daniela Vega.

The song "White Horse" was also used in Thierry Mugler's spring 2012 menswear campaign film titled "Brother's of Arcadia". Ruiz was also featured in the film seen in provocative S&M posturings.

Their third single "Prisoner of Love" featured Anohni who also appeared in the song's video also directed by Marco Ovando and styled by Nicola Formichetti.

In 2012, after a two-month North American tour with American synth-pop band Holy Ghost!, the trio disbanded and Ruiz continued her work in electropop and dance under the same name. She released a second Jessica 6 album titled The Capricorn, which was called “seductive, dark, smart, and as catchy as Miss Jackson's greatest hits” by i-D Magazine.

In 2018, she released The Eliot Sessions which received rave reviews in Billboard and landed Ruiz an artist profile in Harper's Bazaar.

=== Borough Gypsy ===
In 2013, Ruiz completed a two-month residency at the Clocktower Gallery in downtown New York City where she completed a mixtape project titled "Borough Gypsy" which the gallery described as "a lo-fi cassette tape trip down memory lane using the grit of 90's Hip Hop combined with Soul and acoustic folk elements." The mixtape debuted at the Clocktower Galleries' studio space which was "transformed into a world where visitors step into the mind of the borough gypsy and get to see and sift through the urban tale as they listen to the album unfold. Visitors are granted full access to diaries, sketchbooks, photo albums and song writing journals which document the album's progress as well as the emotional progression which inspired its content. Also on display are hand-made items used for stage shows, items from Nomi's childhood, and some of her first ever recorded demos which are only available in reel-to-reel and cassette tape format."

She released the mixtape to the public via SoundCloud and followed it up in 2016 with "Borough Gypsy" vol. 2 "NOMI vs DILLA" where she wrote and sang over instrumentals produced by J Dilla. It premiered in The Source accompanied by visuals directed by long time collaborator Gabriel Magdaleno.

=== Essays ===
As an essayist, Ruiz has been outspoken about discrimination in the music industry and has published intimate essays and poems on feminism, sex, romance and gender identity in books by Emely Nue of Pussy Riot, Jezebel, The Fader and more.

On March 9, 2017, Jezebel published Ruiz's essay titled "The Lingering Trauma of Searching for Love as a Trans Youth" where she addresses how shame can lead to abusive relationships stating "What a fragile device, to be frail in the eyes of the preying."

On June 12, 2018, INTO Magazine published Ruiz's essay titled "The Storm Inside: Loving Trans Women in a Toxic World" Here Ruiz touches on how masculine ideology affects men who are transamorous and how that leads to complications when finding love, "shame is the most common form of child abuse, and the most common tool used to shape and mold young boys on their journey to becoming men."

On September 7, 2018, Talkhouse asked Ruiz to contribute a piece for their Gig Economy column. They published her essay on "Identity, Equality and Fighting for a Livable Wage". Here Ruiz touched on her struggles in the music industry as well as her time with Hercules & Love Affair, "I think back over all the obstacles I've overcome and still face, count all my blessings and successes, and realize that nothing will ever amount to my biggest win yet: living my truth."

=== Acting and television ===
In 2018, Ruiz made her acting debut on Kurt Sutter's Sons of Anarchy spin-off series Mayans M.C. on FX and stars in the Muay Thai boxing feature film drama Haymaker. She also appeared on Viceland's Slutever TV series where she discussed the stigma trans women face when embracing and openly discussing sex and sexuality.

In June 2023, it was announced that Ruiz would voice Tabi in the animated series Primos, which premiered in July 2024 on Disney Channel but cancelled in 2025.

== Musical collaborations ==
Song	Album	Artist	Year
"You'll Never Know"	The Enlightened Family: A Collection Of Lost Songs	The Enlightened Family	2005
"You Belong"	Hercules & Love Affair	Hercules & Love Affair	2008
"Hercules Theme"	Hercules & Love Affair	Hercules & Love Affair	2008
"I'm Telling You"	You Belong	Hercules & Love Affair	2008
"I'm Deranged"	We Were So Turned On: A Tribute To David Bowie	Jessica 6	2010
"Desire"	Desire EP	Eli Escobar	2011
"Sway"	House Of Beni	Beni	2011
"Let's Celebrate"	Blast From The Past	The Ones	2012
"Broken Toy"	Enemy EP	NR& (Keinemusik)	2013
"Enemy"	Enemy EP	NR& (Keinemusik)	2013
"Money Talks"	Money Talks	Thodoris Triantafillou & CJ Jeff	2013
"A Different Corner"	A Different Corner EP	Mansta	2015
"The Man Inside You"	Trilogy (Chapter 1)	Thodoris Triantafillou	2015
"Fist"	Love Is Gone/Fist EP	Olga Kouklaki	2015
"Love Is Gone"	Love Is Gone/Fist EP	Olga Kouklaki	2015
"Can't Stop Dancing"	Happiness	Eli Escobar	2016
"Phreeky"	Happiness	Eli Escobar	2016
"In The Dark"	Happiness	Eli Escobar	2016
"4 Luv"	Happiness	Eli Escobar	2016
"Taste Like"	Spoken For EP	NR& (Keinemusik)	2016
"Spoken For"	Spoken For EP	NR& (Keinemusik)	2016
"Chemical Love"	Animal Feelings	Animal Feelings	2016
"Bumper"	You Are Safe	Keinemusik	2017
"Into You"	Into You	Nomi & Animal Feelings	2018
"Divine Love"	Soft Touches EP	Animal Feelings	2018
"Like a Ghost"		Sam Sparro	2021
"Ya Te Vi"	Lo que me haces sentir	Zemmoa	2021

== Discography ==
Title	Year	Label
Lost in Lust	2005	Park Side Records
Hercules and Love Affair	2008	DFA Records
See The Light	2011	Peacefrog Records
Borough Gypsy vol. 1	2013	Park Side Records
The Capricorn	2015	Park Side Records
Borough Gypsy vol. 2 Nomi vs Dilla	2016	Park Side Records
Lonely Love Affair	2018	Park Side Records
Still Your Girl	2018	Park Side Records
The ELIOT Sessions	2018	Park Side Records

== Music videos ==
Year	Album	Video	Director(s)	Link
2008	Hercules & Love Affair	"You Belong"	Kris Moyes	Video on Vimeo
2009	See the Light	"Fun Girl"	Bijoux Altamirano	Video on YouTube
2011	See the Light	"White Horse"	Marco Ovando	Video on YouTube
2011	See the Light	"Prisoner of Love"	Marco Ovando	Video on YouTube
2014	Borough Gypsy	"Life Or C.R.E.A.M."	Gabriel Magdaleno	Video on YouTube
2015	The Capricorn	"Down Low"	Gabriel Magdaleno	Video on YouTube
2015	The Capricorn	"Can't Tear Us Apart"	Gabriel Magdaleno	Video on YouTube
2016	Animal Feelings	"Chemical Love"	Adam France	Video on YouTube
2016	Borough Gypsy 2	"Bullet Proof"	Gabriel Magdaleno	Video on YouTube
2016	Borough Gypsy 2	"The Scent"	Gabriel Magdaleno	Video on YouTube
2016	Borough Gypsy 2	"The Light"	Gabriel Magdaleno	Video on YouTube
2016	Borough Gypsy 2	"Funky 4 Ya"	Gabriel Magdaleno	Video on YouTube
2016	Borough Gypsy 2	"Wilderness"	Gabriel Magdaleno	Video on YouTube
2016	Borough Gypsy 2	"Something More"	Gabriel Magdaleno	Video on YouTube
2018	The ELIOT Sessions	"The Storm Inside"	Juampi Mejias	Video on YouTube

== Filmography ==
Year	Title	Role	Notes
2018	Mayans M.C.	Gracie	1 episode
2018	Slutever	Herself	1 episode
2020	Dispatches from Elsewhere	Party Goer #2	1 episode
2021	Haymaker	Nomi	
2021	Pose	April	1 episode
2024–2025	Primos	Tabi Ramirez (voice)	Main role
