= Omnion =

Studio album by Hercules and Love Affair
- Released: September 1, 2017
- Length: 54:16
- Label: Atlantic, Big Beat
- Producer: Andy Butler, Leonid Lipelis, Phil Moffa

Hercules and Love Affair chronology
The Feast of the Broken Heart (2014)	Omnion (2017)	In Amber (2022)

Professional ratings
Aggregate scores
Source	Rating
Metacritic	77/100
Review scores
Source	Rating
AllMusic	4/5 stars
DIY	4/5 stars
Exclaim!	5/10
The Guardian	4/5 stars
Pitchfork	7.7/10
Slant	4/5 stars

Omnion is the fourth studio album by Hercules and Love Affair, released on September 1, 2017.

== Track listing ==
No.	Title	Featured Artist	Length
1.	"Omnion"	Sharon Van Etten	4:54
2.	"Controller"	Faris Badwan (of the band The Horrors)	4:25
3.	"Rejoice"	Rouge Mary	5:11
4.	"Are You Still Certain?"	Mashrou' Leila	4:43
5.	"Running"	Sisy Ey	4:39
6.	"Fools Wear Crowns"		5:19
7.	"Lies"	Gustaph	6:05
8.	"Wild Child"	Rouge Mary	4:07
9.	"My Curse and Cure"	Gustaph	4:57
10.	"Through Your Atmosphere"	Faris Badwan	5:00
11.	"Epilogue"	Gustaph	4:56
Total length:			54:16

Track listing adapted from Consequence of Sound.

== Charts ==
Chart (2017)	Peak position
Belgian Albums (Ultratop Flanders)	159
