= Blue Songs (album) =

Studio album by Hercules and Love Affair
- Released: January 28, 2011
- Recorded: 2009–10; Feedback Studio (Vienna); Lofish Studio, Midnight Sun (New York City); Room 5 Recording (San Francisco); E Studios (Berlin)
- Genres: Nu-disco; house
- Length: 57:02
- Label: Moshi Moshi
- Producers: Andrew Butler; Mark Pistel; Patrick Pulsinger

Hercules and Love Affair chronology
Hercules and Love Affair (2008)	Blue Songs (2011)	The Feast of the Broken Heart (2014)

Singles from Blue Songs
- 1. "My House" Released: December 13, 2010; 2. "Painted Eyes" Released: April 18, 2011

Blue Songs is the second studio album by American electronic music band Hercules and Love Affair, released on January 28, 2011, by Moshi Moshi Records. The album features guest appearances from Bloc Party's Kele Okereke on the song "Step Up," and also includes vocal contributions from Kim Ann Foxman, Aerea Negrot and Shaun Wright. The song "It's Alright" is a cover of the Pet Shop Boys' 1988 song of the same name, originally recorded and released by Sterling Void and Paris Brightledge in 1987.

== Critical reception ==
Professional ratings
Aggregate scores
Source	Rating
Metacritic	68/100
Review scores
Source	Rating
AllMusic	4/5 stars
The A.V. Club	B
Drowned in Sound	7/10
The Guardian	2/5 stars
musicOMH	3.5/5 stars
Pitchfork	6.6/10
PopMatters	7/10
Rolling Stone	3/5 stars
Slant Magazine	3/5 stars
Spin	7/10

Blue Songs received generally positive reviews from music critics. At Metacritic, which assigns a weighted average rating out of 100 to reviews from mainstream critics, the album received an average score of 68, based on 28 reviews, which indicates "generally favorable reviews". Barry Walters of Spin wrote that "Blue Songs' prevailing mood is deep indigo, not ultraviolet, yet that darkness heightens and complicates. By shunning regulation house fierceness, Butler and crew offer gentle nocturnal sacrament."

== Track listing ==
No.	Title	Writer(s)	Length
1.	"Painted Eyes"	Andrew Butler	6:02
2.	"My House"	Butler; Roberto Gallegos	4:52
3.	"Answers Come in Dreams"	Butler; Gallegos	5:24
4.	"Leonora"	Butler	4:32
5.	"Boy Blue"	Butler	5:00
6.	"Blue Songs"	Butler	5:38
7.	"Falling"	Butler; Gallegos	4:54
8.	"I Can't Wait"	Butler; Kim Ann Foxman	5:55
9.	"Step Up"	Butler	4:04
10.	"Visitor"	Butler; Gallegos	4:41
11.	"It's Alright"	Sterling Void; Paris Brightledge	6:00
Total length:			57:02

US edition disc one – bonus tracks
No.	Title	Writer(s)	Length
12.	"Revenge"	Butler; Foxman	4:44
13.	"Chanel 2"	Butler	6:12
14.	"Shelter" (The xx cover)	Romy Madley Croft; Oliver Sim; Jamie Smith	3:45
Total length:			71:58

US edition disc two
No.	Title	Writer(s)	Length
1.	"My House" (Stopmakingme Remix)	Butler; Gallegos	6:22
2.	"My House" (Tensnake Remix)	Butler; Gallegos	8:03
3.	"My House" (Derrick Carter's BHQ Voodoo Remix)	Butler; Gallegos	9:07
4.	"My House" (Andy Butler Remix)	Butler; Gallegos	5:49
5.	"Painted Eyes" (In Flagranti Remix)	Butler	6:34
6.	"Painted Eyes" (Moonlight Matters Remix)	Butler	5:55
7.	"Painted Eyes" (Wolfram Remix)	Butler	6:16
Total length:			48:06

== Personnel ==
Credits adapted from the liner notes of Blue Songs.

Hercules and Love Affair

- Andrew Butler – production
- Kim Ann Foxman – performer, musician
- Aérea Negrot – performer, musician
- Mark Pistel – additional production, co-production, mixing (track 8); performer, musician
- Shaun J. Wright – performer, musician

Additional personnel

- Mike Aaberg – performer, musician
- Rich Armstrong – performer, musician
- Marco Braca – grooming
- Sheldon Brown – performer, musician
- Marcelo Burlon – creative director
- Crane – design
- Simon Davey – mastering
- Lynn Farmer – performer, musician
- Jose Flores – performer, musician
- Raffaele Grossi – assistant photography
- Evan Herring – performer, musician
- Matteo Montanari – photography
- Murdoch – marble engraving
- Kele Okereke – performer, musician
- Patrick Pulsinger – co-production, mixing (tracks 1–7, 9–11); performer, musician
- Jakob Schneidewind – performer, musician
- Martin Siewert – performer, musician
- Jeremy Turner – performer, musician
- Marty Wehner – performer, musician
- Morgan Wiley – performer, musician

== Charts ==
Chart (2011)	Peak position
Austrian Albums Chart	57
Belgian Albums Chart (Flanders)	79
German Albums Chart	75
Swiss Albums Chart	89
UK Albums Chart	105
US Dance/Electronic Albums	25

== Release history ==
Region	Date	Label
Germany	January 28, 2011	Cooperative Music
France	January 31, 2011	Cooperative Music
United Kingdom	January 31, 2011	Moshi Moshi
Italy	February 8, 2011	Cooperative Music
Australia	February 18, 2011	Moshi Moshi
United States	August 16, 2011	Moshi Moshi
