= You Belong =

Single by Hercules and Love Affair

from the album Hercules and Love Affair
- B-side: "I'm Telling You"
- Released: July 7, 2008
- Genre: House
- Length: 4:12
- Label: DFA
- Songwriter(s): Andrew Butler, Antony
- Producer(s): Andrew Butler, Tim Goldsworthy

Hercules and Love Affair singles chronology
"Blind" (2008)	"You Belong" (2008)	"My House" (2010)

Music video
- "You Belong" on YouTube

"You Belong" is the second single from the eponymous debut album by Hercules and Love Affair. It features Nomi Ruiz with backing vocals by Antony Hegarty.

== Critical reception ==
Philip Sherburne of Pitchfork Media commented that "it's the way that Butler and his collaborators mold formalist fidelity into something stranger that makes the track really sing," and that the "chords give it the quality of an exploding rainbow." NME said that the song "is superb, but it’s essentially just an old Chicago house tune given a digital spit’n’polish."

Slant Magazine placed "You Belong" at #9 on the Top 25 Singles of 2008.

== Music video ==
The music video for "You Belong" features Nomi Ruiz singing to the lyrics while several background dancers are voguing. Andrew Butler appears as a monk who plays with futuristic hand toys while Kim Ann Foxman is seen playing glass harmonicas.

== Track listings ==
- UK CD single
1. "You Belong" - 4:14
2. "I'm Telling You" - 3:44
3. "You Belong (Hercules Club Mix)" - 6:30
4. "You Belong (D's New Rhythm Bounce)" - 8:41
- U.S. CD single
1. "You Belong (Radio Edit)" - 3:46
2. "You Belong (Album Version)" - 4:11
3. "You Belong (D's New Rhythm Bounce)" - 8:40
4. "You Belong (Kevin Saunderson Remix)" - 7:17
5. "You Belong (Riton Rerub)" - 4:51
6. "You Belong (Hercules Club Mix)" - 6:28
7. "You Belong (Album Instrumental)" - 4:11

== In popular culture ==
"You Belong" was used in the pilot episode of the TV show How to Make It in America.

== Charts ==
Chart (2008)	Peak Position
US Dance/Club Play Songs	39
Scottish Top 100	_{42}
