= In Amber =

Studio album by Hercules and Love Affair
- Released: June 17, 2022
- Recorded: Blackbird Studios (Berlin), Vox-Ton (Berlin), Dampoort Studios (Ghent)
- Length: 56:30
- Labels: Skint; BMG

Hercules and Love Affair chronology
Omnion (2017)	In Amber (2022)

Singles from In Amber
- 1. "Grace" Released: February 2022; 2. "Poisonous Storytelling" Released: April 2022; 3. "One" Released: May 2022; 4. "Dissociation" Released: June 2022

In Amber is the fifth studio album by Hercules and Love Affair, released digitally and physically on June 17, 2022, by Skint Records/BMG. The band's founder, singer and musician, Andy Butler worked again with singer Anohni (previously of Anohni and the Johnsons): Anohni appeared on several tracks, including the singles "Poisonous Storytelling", and "One". "Grace", the first song released ahead of the album, was sung by Butler with Icelandic singer Elin Ey.

AllMusic wrote that In Amber, "pivoted away from upbeat, dance-oriented tracks into a more reflective style. Featuring Anohni for the first time since 2008, the record channeled emotions such as anger, fear, and sadness while retaining the pristine production that Butler has cultivated throughout his career".

In Amber received critical acclaim. It was named "Album of the Year 2022" by The Arts Desk, and Slant Magazine included "One" in "The 50 Best Songs of 2022" list.

== Background, writing and recording ==
Anohni suggested Andy Butler that they worked songs together and they ended up composing six tracks. Butler then showed other songs he was writing and they realised that they wanted to record as a Hercules and Love Affair project.

The album was conceived over a period of five years. At a certain point, they "started thinking about the texture of percussion, something with humanity that might complement the content of the songs". Anohni suggested that they record with drummer Budgie of Siouxsie and the Banshees and the Creatures. Anohni stated: "It had this kind of perfection that was almost sugary. Budgie, as a drummer, completely epitomises that volatile, volcanic texture of creation, but also has a very exquisite form". "He found ways to articulate quite a feminine violence, or a feminine exuberance; a strength, a really fortified, agile, threatening at times power".

Multi instrumentalist Reinhard Vanbergen joined in for the sessions and Butler asked Icelandic singer Elin Ey (complete name Elin Eyþórsdóttir) to do backing vocals on the single "Grace" and the lead on "Dissociation". Anohni suggested that Butler sings more than two songs on the album. It is the first time on Butler's career that he opened an album with him on vocals. Butler wanted to express new things in the songs : "there are emotional fields I hadn’t ventured into previously [...] Destruction, rage, loss, but also redemption and journeying towards empowerment." Butler pictured the album as dance music with rage and existential contemplation.

The album was different from previous Hercules and Love Affair works. Music journalist Dean Mayo Davies wrote that In Amber was about 'contemplating the inevitability of mortality, and trying to find peace within that fact". Butler stated he needed to express his discomfort and could not make something comfortable: "making a 90’s sounding techno or house record, or an odd 80’s sounding dance track was not anything I needed to do".

Journalist Martin Aston noted that there were echoes of This Mortal Coil on the record, plus thudding drums which are traces of dark post-punk, which was one of the genres Butler listened to during his "traumatised teenage years".

== Release and formats ==
In Amber was released June 17, 2022, on digital, CD and double black vinyl via Skint Records/BMG. The double vinyl was housed in a gatefold sleeve.

Two limited editions, one on gold double vinyl and another one on transparent grey double vinyl, were available from selected shops and webstores including Rough Trade, HMV and the band's official website. The 'Transparent Grey' double vinyl edition which was limited to 300 copies, was available via Rough Trade.

== Critical reception ==
Professional ratings
Aggregate scores
Source	Rating
Metacritic	77/100
Review scores
Source	Rating
AllMusic	4.5/5 stars
The Arts Desk	5/5 stars
The Line of Best Fit	7/10
Mojo	4/5 stars
Musikexpress	5.5/6 stars
Pitchfork	6.7/10
PopMatters	8/10
Uncut	8/10
The Wire	8/10

In Amber received generally positive reviews from music critics upon its release. At Metacritic, which assigns a weighted average rating out of 100 to reviews from mainstream critics, the album received an average score of 77, based on 13 reviews, which indicates "generally favorable reviews".

The Arts Desk dubbed the record "a masterpiece of dark music for dark times". Reviewer Joe Muggs wrote that the album brought "stunning results", dealing with dark subjects such as "alienation, mistrust, violent homophobia, abuse, religious terror, war" but there was also "redemption, strength and love" inside the songs. Muggs added that "the doomed and the hopeful are inseparable, and the tang of each is emphasised by the other ... and musically, the mood is just as finely balanced" before concluding "it’s a truly beautiful piece of work". In a 4 out of 5 star review, Mojo said that Hercules and Love Affair went dark while adding that In Amber was "frequently beautiful". Reviewer Martin Aston remarked that Butler was "impressively stentorian" and he alternates with Anohni. He added that In Amber was as much Anohni's record as his. In a review rated eight out of ten, Uncut praised the album saying, there is "plenty of solace to be found in performances by Iceland’s Elin Ey and the ever-remarkable Anohni".

Davies of Another Magazine wrote that "The best dance or electronic music often carries a melancholy" and In Amber sees Hercules and Love Affair pushing to new territory. The Quietus wrote that there is "a wealth of sophistication in the spacious arrangements" and "a richness to the timbres that play central roles in the compositions". Reviewer Zara Hedderman wrote that on "all of the songs from In Amber, this is an immediately enveloping composition which retains its power after countless listens". The Line of Best Fit wrote that "the album marks a break with the past but ... its move ... feels totally natural and necessary". Music journalist Simon Heavisides praised the "spine tingling backing vocals from Icelander Elin Ey" on the single "One" and the songs featuring Anohni saying, "few singers could handle with the requisite gravity but at the same time convey the beauty within what may appear a stark lyric".

Ken Scrudato wrote that the album was "a deeply reflective meditation" on troubling times, while nothing there was a "genuine optimism shining through the sonic solemnity" of the opening song "Grace". In a review rated 6.7 out of 10, Pitchfork wrote: "Stripping away the dancefloor euphoria of his most recognizable work, Andy Butler’s latest is a moody left-turn highlighted by some winning collaborations with Anohni". For AllMusic, Heather Phares claimed that it was, "thrilling to hear such unguarded yet exquisitely crafted confessions from Hercules & Love Affair as it was to have them transport listeners to dance floor nirvana."

PopMatters included In Amber in "The Best Electronic albums of 2022" list.

== Track listing ==
All tracks are written by Andy Butler, except where noted.

In Amber track listing
No.	Title	Writer(s)	Featured artist	Length
1.	"Grace"			3:56
2.	"One"	Butler; Anohni	Anohni	4:37
3.	"You've Won This War"			5:45
4.	"Christian Prayers"	Butler; Anohni	Anohni	5:47
5.	"Dissociation"		Elin Eyþórsdóttir	4:14
6.	"Contempt for You"	Butler; Anohni	Anohni	5:05
7.	"Gates of Separation"			5:11
8.	"Killing His Family"	Butler; Anohni	Anohni	3:50
9.	"Who Will Save Us"	Butler; Anohni	Anohni	4:07
10.	"The Eyes of the Father"			5:16
11.	"Poisonous Storytelling"	Butler; Anohni	Anohni	5:20
12.	"Repent"			3:18
Total length:				56:30

== Personnel ==
- Andrew Butler – vocals, all instruments
- Anohni – vocals ("One", "Christian Prayers", "Contempt for You", "Killing His Family", "Who Will Save Us", "Poisonous Storytelling")
- Elin Eyþórsdóttir – vocals ("Dissociation"), backing vocals ("One")
- Budgie – drums
- Reinhard Vandergen – mandola, guitar, bass, strings, timpani, strings recording
- Fitzroy Madsen – saxophone ("Killing His Family")
- Gilles Demolder – guitar ("Christian Prayers")
- Michael Ungerer – drums recording at Blackbird Studios, Berlin
- Francesco Donadello – drums recording at Vox-Ton, Berlin

== Charts ==
Chart performance for In Amber
Chart (2022)	Peak position
UK Dance Albums (Official Charts)	10
UK Independent Albums (Official Charts)	27
