= Shaun J. Wright =

American DJ, producer, vocalist, and dancer

- Born: Maywood, Illinois, U.S.
- Origin: Chicago, Illinois, U.S.
- Genres: house; techno; nu-disco; electronic music; vogue (dance)
- Occupations: disc jockey; producer; vocalist; dancer
- Instruments: turntables; vocals
- Works: Blue Songs (album)
- Years active: 2008–present
- Labels: Twirl Recordings; Crosstown Rebels; Classic Music Company
- Formerly of: Hercules and Love Affair

Shaun J. Wright is an American DJ, producer, singer and dancer known for Chicago house music and ballroom culture.

== Early life and education ==
Wright was born and raised in Maywood, Illinois, a western suburb of Chicago. As a child, they were introduced to house music through local Chicago radio and the city's dance culture. Wright has credited their mother as an early musical influence, noting that she was a lead singer in a band, and often played Steely Dan, Anita Baker, and The Manhattan Transfer while preparing for performances.

As a teenager, Wright became familiar with elements of ballroom culture by visiting black, gay clubs in Chicago. At age 15, Wright viewed the 1991 documentary Paris is Burning, which Wright credits for helping them connect what they observed at local clubs and balls.

Wright attended Morehouse College in Atlanta, and became active as a dancer and voguer in the city's local ballroom scene. They later attended the London College of Fashion, and graduated with a Master of Arts in Fashion Curation.

== Career ==
In 2008, Wright relocated to New York City, where they were introduced to Andrew Butler, who founded the indie electronic band, Hercules and Love Affair. They joined the band as lead vocalist and began touring with the group in 2009. They appeared on the band's second studio album Blue Songs, which was released in 2011. Wright also released their solo debut album Mr. Intl Presents Forevermore along with the single "Forever More" the same year.

In 2012, Wright was introduced to Chicago dance/electronic producer Alinka. The pair released the EP Twirl Vol 1 in 2013. In 2014, they founded the record label Twirl Records after meeting Chicago house DJ and producer Derrick Carter. They released the single "Journey Into The Deep" as the label's first record.

In 2015, Wright and Alinka released "Matters of the Heart" through Classic Music Company, a record label founded by Luke Solomon and Derrick Carter. The record received airplay on the Annie Mac (radio show) on BBC Radio 1. Mixmag rated the record a 6 out of 10, noting that it "carries on in the same vein" as their prior release. Later that year, Do312 included both Wright and Alinka on its list of "39 Chicago Bands & Artists That Kicked 2015's Ass", and noted that the duo "received a remix treatment" from The Blessed Madonna earlier in the year.

In 2016, Wright and Alinka released the Face The Truth EP through UK record label Crosstown Rebels. Vice wrote that the record sat "firmly in the tradition of deep, stripped back, Chicago house".

Wright was featured on Honey Dijon's single "808 State of Mind" in 2017. Pitchfork wrote that the song "merges Chicago house, the aesthetics of the ballroom, and other elements of dance-music history into a euphoric whole". The Fader noted that Wright and Alinka were the originators of the material later adapted by Honey Dijon.

In 2019, Wright was featured in French filmmaker Serge Garcia's short film A Child of House. Them described the film as an exploration of "queerness, race, chosen family, being excluded from the genre of dance music, and Wright's childhood in Chicago’s early days of the house scene".

Wright served as the DJ for Sadie Barnette's The New Eagle Creek Saloon, which took place in New York in 2022. Artforum reviewed the event, and highlighted Wright for their use of curated clips from The New Dance Show and contemporary ballroom footage, which had been projected on the walls. Wright was later featured on Stacker's list of "50 Great Albums by Queer Artists of Color".

In 2023, Wright performed the opening DJ set for Beyonce's Renaissance World Tour concert at Soldier Field in Chicago.

In 2024, Wright and Alinka relaunched Twirl Records after a short hiatus.

In 2025, Wright cancelled their performances at Sónar in Barcelona, Spain as part of the Boycott of Superstruct Entertainment festivals. In October, Wright received the Frankie Knuckles Genre Defining Award for their contributions to Chicago house music culture at the 2025 Annual Gaggys.

== Personal life ==
Wright is based in Chicago. They are queer and gender non-conforming. (Note: Wright is gender non-conforming and uses they/them pronouns.)

== Select discography ==
=== EPs ===
- Face the Truth (2016)
- Greed (2016)

=== Singles and other releases ===
- "Forever More" (2011)
- "Wait For Love" (2015)
- "The Love Divine" (2015)
- "Walk Into the Unknown" (2018)
