= Blind (Hercules and Love Affair song) =

Single by Hercules and Love Affair

from the album Hercules and Love Affair
- Released: March 3, 2008
- Genre: Post-disco
- Length: 6:18 (Album Version); 3:47 (Radio Edit)
- Label: DFA Records
- Songwriters: Antony Hegarty, Andrew Butler
- Producers: Antony Hegarty, Andrew Butler, Tim Goldsworthy

Hercules and Love Affair singles chronology
"Classique #2" / "Roar" (2008)	"Blind" (2008)	"You Belong" (2008)

Music video
- "Blind" on YouTube

"Blind" is the first single from the eponymous debut album by Hercules and Love Affair.

== Writing and inspiration ==
"Blind" was written by Anohni and Andrew Butler. The song began as a poem by Butler before it was recorded by Anohni.

== Critical reception ==
Jacob Wright of Resident Advisor commented that the song is "accessible," yet is "new and ambitious and different, and it has quality."

The Chicago Maroon placed "Blind" at #2 on the Top 5 Songs of 2008. "Blind" ranked at #2 on the 10 Best Singles of 2008 list by American magazine Entertainment Weekly. Mother Jones ranked "Blind" at #14 on The Best Singles of 2008. Likewise, NME placed "Blind" at #18 on the Top 50 Singles of 2008. Pitchfork Media placed "Blind" at #1 on The 100 Best Tracks of 2008 and at #18 on The Top 500 Tracks of the 2000s. PopMatters placed "Blind" at #8 on The Best Singles of 2008. Resident Advisor voted "Blind" at #6 on the Top 30 Tracks of 2008 and at #18 on the Top 100 Tracks of the 2000s. Rolling Stone placed "Blind" at #77 on the 100 Best Singles of 2008. Slant Magazine placed "Blind" at #4 on the Top 25 Singles of 2008 and at #16 on the Best of the Aughts: Singles. Spin placed "Blind" at #19 on The 20 Best Songs of 2008. In October 2011, NME placed it at number 128 on its list 150 Best Tracks of the Past 15 Years.

== Music video ==
The music video for "Blind" was directed by Saam Farahmand. The video features English actress Jaime Winstone. Winstone is seen walking through a Greek ritualistic orgy. Doric columns and a lot of swirling mist are seen throughout the video.

== Track listings ==
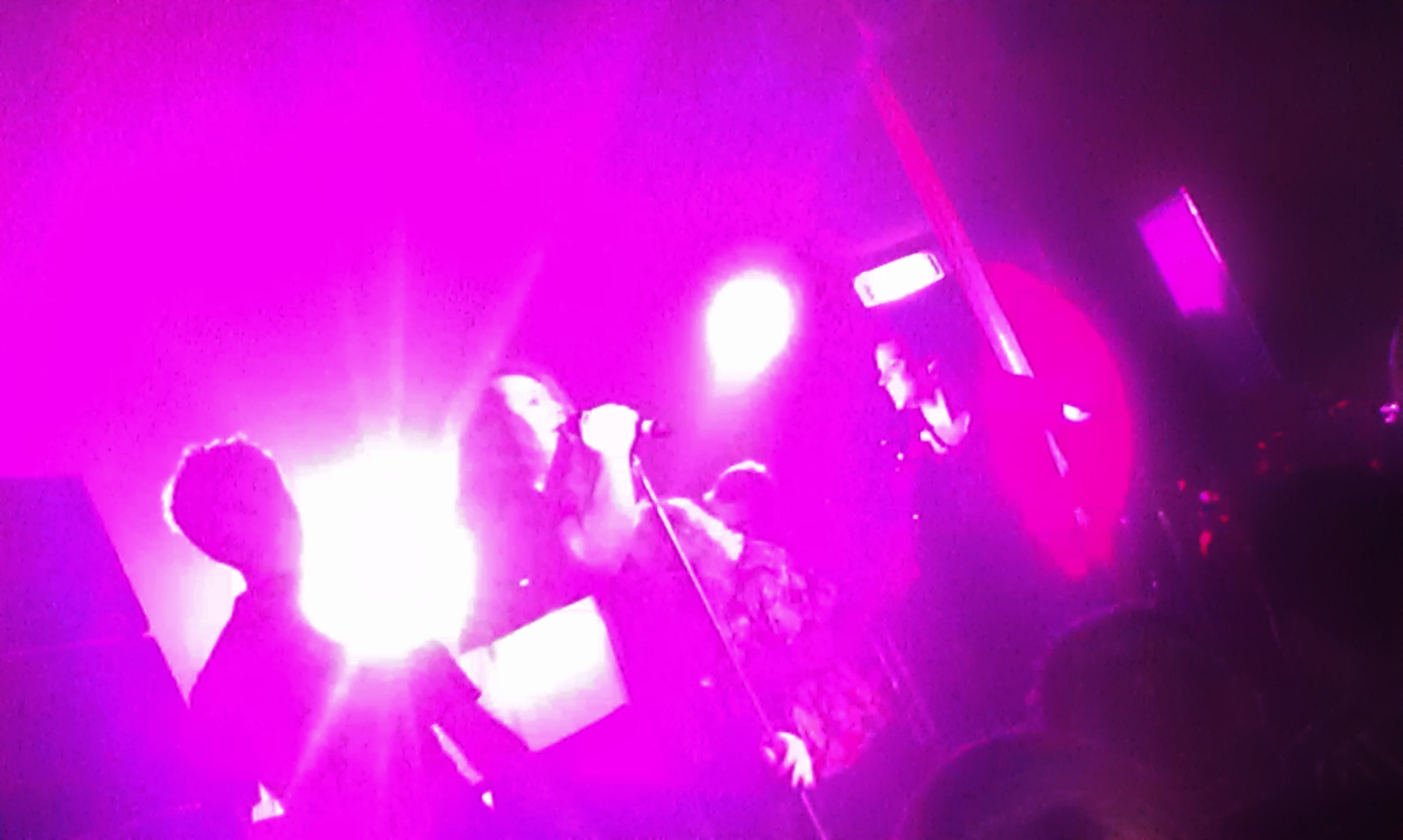
Anohni performing "Blind" as a part of the Hercules and Love Affair collective during the 2012 Meltdown Festival at London's Southbank Centre.

- UK CD single
1. "Blind (Radio Edit)" – 3:47
2. "Shadows" – 4:19
3. "Blind (Frankie Knuckles Vocal)" – 7:54
4. "Blind (Hercules Club Mix)" – 7:00
- iTunes EP
1. "Blind" – 6:16
2. "Shadows" – 4:15
3. "Blind (Frankie Knuckles Remix)" – 7:51
4. "Blind (Serge Santiago Version)" – 10:48
5. "Blind (Hercules Club Mix)" – 6:56
6. "Blind (Frankie Knuckles Dub)" – 8:09

== Song usage ==
"Blind (Serge Santiago Version)" appeared on the mix album FabricLive.41 by Simian Mobile Disco.

== Charts ==
Chart (2008)	Peak position
Belgian Singles Chart (Flanders)	23
Belgian Tip Chart (Wallonia)	22
Belgian Dance Chart	2
Hungarian Editors' Choice Top 40 Chart	27
Italian Singles Chart	12
UK Singles Chart	40
UK Dance (OCC)	1
U.S. Dance/Club Play Songs	22

== Nominations ==
Year	Category	Genre	Recording	Result
UK Music Video Awards
2008	Best Producer	Music Video	Blind	Nominated

== See also ==
- List of post-disco artists and songs
