= Hercules and Love Affair (album) =

Studio album by Hercules and Love Affair
- Released: March 10, 2008
- Studio: GoodandEvil (Brooklyn, New York City); Lofish (Manhattan, New York City); Plantain (Manhattan, New York City)
- Genre: Disco; house; electro-funk
- Length: 46:29
- Label: DFA
- Producer: Andrew Butler; Tim Goldsworthy

Hercules and Love Affair chronology
Hercules and Love Affair (2008)	Blue Songs (2011)

Singles from Hercules and Love Affair
- 1. "Blind" Released: March 3, 2008; 2. "You Belong" Released: July 7, 2008

Hercules and Love Affair is the debut studio album by the American electronic music band Hercules and Love Affair, released on March 10, 2008, by DFA Records. The album was produced by Andrew Butler and Tim Goldsworthy. Andrew Raposo (of fellow DFA band Automato) and Tyler Pope (of !!!) contributed bass to the album, while Anohni co-wrote and performed vocals on select songs.

== Music ==
"Blind"
Lead single "Blind" discusses the loss of innocence.

Most reviewers comment on the album's musical style as an homage to or re-imagining of disco and classic house music. Fact magazine dubbed the album's style "a pulsating, glamorous, elegiac mix of classic disco influences, live instrumentation and modernist, mind-spangling electronic production." Similarly, The Daily Telegraph critic Bernadette McNulty dubs the music "d-i-s-c-o in its seventies glory" into which "Butler weaves [...] fractured Chicago house beats and pulsing synths," going on to refer to the overall style of the album as "a tableau of beautiful, dysphoric disco visions." The Guardian also describes the music in the same terms, commenting "it sounds like proper late-70s disco. Not the camp glitterball retro electro-pop of Kylie circa 'Spinning Round', but actual underground disco, like something long-lost from the vaults of The Loft or the Paradise Garage, real 1977–78 vintage stuff." However, while most critics focus on the obvious musical debt to disco, some highlight the album's eclectic range of styles, such as Time Out's Eddy Lawrence, for whom the album "has dark, psychedelic moments, such as the downbeat, mildly menacing, almost Congotronic 'Easy' alongside outright funky party stuff like 'You Belong'." Butler himself describes the album's musical approach thus:

I always say it's a rhythmic, artsy kind of pop music that was made with classic dance and electronic music in mind. It has a lot of vocals and is rooted in my childhood.

The album's first single "Blind", co-written and featuring vocals by Anohni, was released on March 3, 2008, and reached number forty on the UK Singles Chart. The NME called it a "stone-cold classic", going on to describe it as "the best kind of dance record: physical and emotional, euphorically happy and deeply, irredeemably sad. It clips along weightlessly; all disco bass, trumpets and rippling synthesiser, as Anohni, his voice like tears rolling down the cheeks of a beautiful 40-year-old woman, muses intoxicatingly on lost innocence and ageing." However, the magazine dismissed the song "You Belong" as "essentially just an old Chicago house tune given a digital spit'n'polish." The music video for "Blind" was directed by London-based Saam and features English actress Jamie Winstone walking through clouds of smoke. Pitchfork described the video as a "bacchanalian orgy tak[ing] place all around [Winstone], hearkening back to the pre-AIDS days of disco and places like the Continental Baths, where Larry Levan DJed and which advertisers promoted as recalling 'the glory of ancient Rome'."

== Critical reception ==
Professional ratings
Aggregate scores
Source	Rating
Metacritic	86/100
Review scores
Source	Rating
AllMusic	4.5/5 stars
The A.V. Club	B
The Guardian	3/5 stars
Mojo	4/5 stars
NME	8/10
The Observer	5/5 stars
Pitchfork	9.1/10
Q	4/5 stars
Spin	4/5 stars
The Times	4/5 stars

Hercules and Love Affair received general acclaim from music critics. At Metacritic, which assigns a weighted average rating out of 100 to reviews from mainstream critics, the album received an average score of 86, based on 31 reviews, which indicates "universal acclaim". Fact magazine called it "a unique, deeply satisfying and insanely catchy piece of work." Dan Weiss of The Village Voice praised its "glorious funkscapes". Pitchfork's Philip Sherburne awarded the album 9.1/10, and described it as "Lush, melancholic, gregarious, generous, both precise and a little bit unhinged" before going on to proclaim "this is the most original American dance album in a long while." Pitchfork named "Blind" the best song of 2008 and placed it at number eighteen on the website's list of The Top 500 Tracks of the 2000s, while the album itself was ranked number 132 on their list of the top 200 albums of the 2000s. Paul Flynn of The Observer awarded the album a maximum five stars, commenting that it "concentrates on the musicality of the [disco] genre and leaves the cliches for dust," adding "it is as sweaty, raw and meaningful as the first 12-inch singles that were spun at NY lofts."

The Guardian critic Alexis Petridis was slightly more skeptical, finding the album's first side to be "tremendous fun", but – as a result of its being confined to genre revivalism – to possess "an air of pointlessness". However, he deemed the inclusion of Hegarty's melancholic vocals in the disco setting to be "inspired", and praised the album's "far more inventive second half", as "its atmosphere shifts from touchy-feely warmth to queasy unease to deep melancholy, as if the authors keep being jolted from their nostalgic musical reverie by the thought of how horribly it all ended."

The single "Blind" was included at number two on Entertainment Weekly's list of the 10 Best Singles of 2008.

== Track listing ==
No.	Title	Writer(s)	Length
1.	"Time Will"	Andrew Butler; Anohni	4:34
2.	"Hercules Theme"	Butler; Nomi	4:29
3.	"You Belong"	Butler; Anohni	4:11
4.	"Athene"	Butler	3:59
5.	"Blind"	Butler; Anohni	6:18
6.	"Iris"	Butler	4:15
7.	"Easy"	Butler; Anohni	5:21
8.	"This Is My Love"	Butler	4:58
9.	"Raise Me Up"	Butler; Anohni	3:51
10.	"True/False, Fake/Real"	Butler	4:33
Total length:			46:29

US edition bonus tracks
No.	Title	Writer(s)	Length
11.	"Classique #2"	Butler	6:11
12.	"Roar"	Butler	5:33
13.	"Blind" (video)
Total length:			58:13

US iTunes Store bonus track
No.	Title	Writer(s)	Length
13.	"I'm Telling You"	Butler	3:41
Total length:			61:54

== Personnel ==
Credits adapted from the liner notes of Hercules and Love Affair.

Hercules and Love Affair

- Andrew Butler – production (all tracks); keyboards (tracks 1, 3, 7, 8, 10); marimba (track 6); vocals (tracks 8, 10)
- Anohni – vocals (tracks 1, 5, 7–9); additional production (tracks 1, 5, 9); additional vocals (track 3)
- Kim Ann Foxman – vocals (tracks 4, 6, 10)
- Nomi – vocals (tracks 2, 3)
- Andrew Raposo – bass (tracks 2, 8–10)
- Morgan Wiley – keyboards (tracks 2, 4, 5, 8, 9)
- Carter Yasutaki – trumpet (tracks 2, 5, 6, 8, 9)

Additional personnel

- Kevin Barker – guitar (track 1)
- Steven Berstein – trumpet (tracks 4, 5)
- Eric Broucek – engineering, mixing (all tracks); rhythm guitar (track 8)
- Chris Castagno – additional engineering (track 5)
- Walter Fischbacher – additional engineering (track 5)
- Tim Goldsworthy – drum programming (tracks 1–9); production (all tracks)
- Ben Guttin – drawings
- Cory King – trombone (tracks 2, 6, 8)
- Nick Millhiser – drums (track 2)
- Maxim Moston – strings (tracks 2, 10); drum programming (track 10)
- Alex Nizich – additional engineering (tracks 6, 7, 9, 10)
- Jason Nocito – photography
- Ben Perowsky – drums (tracks 4, 5)
- Tyler Pope – bass (tracks 4, 5)
- Scott Williams – art direction

== Charts ==
Chart (2008)	Peak position
Belgian Albums Chart (Flanders)	12
Belgian Alternative Albums Chart (Flanders)	8
European Top 100 Albums	85
French Albums Chart	144
Irish Albums Chart	44
Italian Albums Chart	33
Norwegian Albums Chart	18
Spanish Albums Chart	84
Swedish Albums Chart	23
UK Albums Chart	31
US Billboard 200	191
US Top Electronic Albums	5
US Top Heatseekers	7

== Release history ==
Region	Date	Label
France	March 10, 2008	EMI
United Kingdom	March 10, 2008	DFA Records
Germany	March 14, 2008	Parlophone
Italy	March 14, 2008	EMI
Australia	March 28, 2008	EMI
United States	June 24, 2008	Mute Records
