= Blue Songs (film) =

1929 film

- Directed by: Joseph Santley
- Starring: Ruth Etting
- Distributed by: Paramount Pictures
- Release date: 1929
- Country: United States
- Language: English

Blue Songs is a 1929 Paramount musical short film directed by Joseph Santley and starring Ruth Etting. It includes the songs "Because My Baby Don't Mean 'Maybe' Now" and "Roses of Yesterday".
