= Marianne Vlaschits =

Austrian painter and installation artist

- Born: 1983 (age 42–43)
- Education: The Slade School of Fine Art
- Awards: Viennacontemporary Bildrecht SOLO Award (2020)

Marianne Vlaschits (born 1983) is an Austrian painter and installation artist.

Vlaschits was born and raised in Vienna.

== Education ==
Vlaschits studied at the Academy of Fine Arts in Vienna. She attended the Slade School of Fine Art in London.

== Art ==
Vlaschits is influenced by camp and kitsch aesthetic. While she primarily creates paintings and installations, Vlaschits has extended her artistry to video and performance art. Her style is characterized as simple, bold and comical.

Vlaschits’ interest in astronomy is evident in her works. It often deals with extraterrestrial life and outer space. Her works are also reflections on gender, utopia, human existence and the future. Vlaschits said she is inspired with the thought of a utopian society where its inhabitants are not bounded by gender, sexualities and bodies.

== Selected works ==
- Self-Portrait as Planetary System
- Bacchus (2011)
- Blue Crystal Fire (2013)
- Panama (2015)
- Venus City (2016)
- Neytiri but with straight hair (2017)
- Peekaboo (2017)
- Mothership (2017)
- Handsome Threesome (2018)
- A New Home (2018)
- The Sword Swallowing Toad (2018)
- Der Hase War Schuld (2018)
- Indigo (2020)
