= Derrick Carter =

Chicago-born DJ with success in Europe

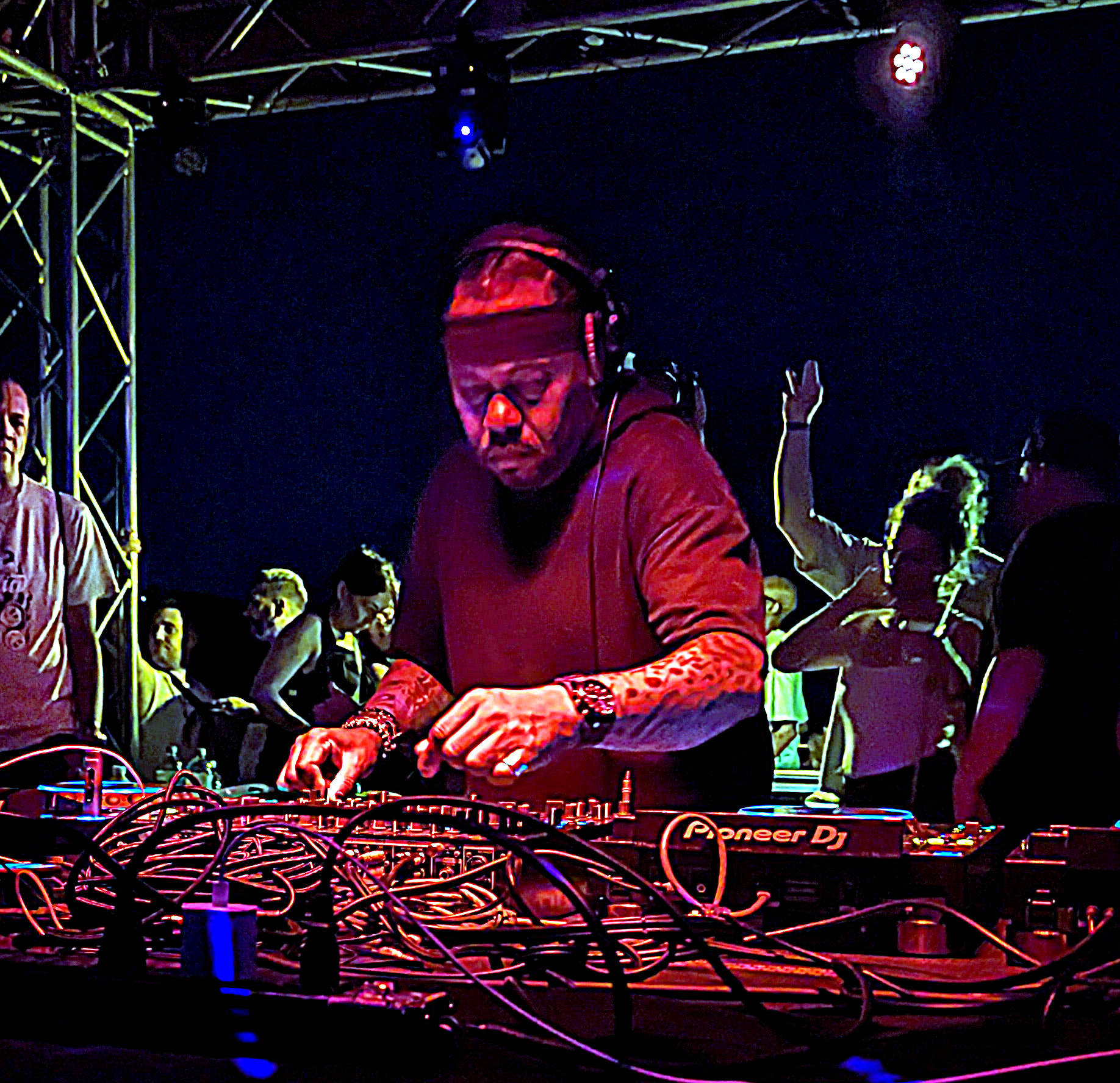
- Carter performing in 2023 at a boat party on the Hudson River

Background information
- Born: October 21, 1969 (age 56); Compton, California, U.S.
- Origin: Chicago, Illinois, U.S.
- Genres: House; Chicago house
- Occupations: DJ; record producer; musician
- Years active: 1988–present

Derrick Carter (born October 21, 1969) is an American DJ, record producer and musician from Chicago, Illinois. He is regarded as one of the best underground house key players currently active and is popular in Europe.

== Biography ==
Derrick Carter was born on October 21, 1969, in Compton, California. Growing up, he was influenced by punk, R&B, disco and house. He embarked on his DJing journey at the age of 10.

His DJing debut occurred in the seventh grade at a friend's birthday party in 1982, marking the start of a journey that would see him transition from a bedroom DJ to a club sensation. By the age of 16, Carter was already making waves in the club scene. His first significant exposure to a live audience was a game-changer, setting the stage for a career that would revolutionize the house and techno genres.

After high school, Carter's journey took him to the University of Illinois in 1987. However, his foray into higher education was short-lived, as the vibrant social scene led him to prioritize partying over academics, resulting in his eventual expulsion. This pivotal moment redirected his focus entirely to music.

Returning to Chicago, Carter took up a job at the record store Imports Etc. It was here, amidst the burgeoning house music explosion, that he honed his skills and networked with the who's who of the industry. His first production, "Fantasy Girl," under the moniker Conception, was a stepping stone to his later EP success.

In 1988, he released an EP entitled "Mood' with Mark Farina and Chris Nazuka as the group Symbols & Instruments. While the record was not a commercial success, it did have a strong influence on the burgeoning ambient techno movement in England. Particularly, this release garnered attention in the UK, particularly influencing the techno and garage movements. This established Carter as an international figure in the underground house scene.

Carter's first international trip in 1991 to perform at club venues marked his entry into the global music scene. His eclectic style and innovative approach quickly gained traction among diverse audiences.

=== Later years ===
Carter rarely gives extensive interviews and has kept a low profile since his rise to fame. Before establishing the groundbreaking record label Classic Recordings in 1995 with Luke Solomon and Chez Damier, Carter experienced a series of setbacks with other label ventures. Classic Recordings, renowned for its unique catalog numbering system, starting at number 100 and counting down, became a symbol of innovation and resilience in the music industry. Carter's DJ sets are firmly rooted in black music of the 1970s, frequently giving nods to old school disco, soul and jazz.

As a remixer, he has worked for a diverse range of artists including The Beloved, The Human League, Ricky Martin, Boris Dlugosch, Modjo, DJ Sneak and Röyksopp. After a brief hiatus, he returned to production, remixing artists such as Rosie Brown and Truman Industries.

In 2006, Carter was named No. 53 in the 100 Most Famous Chicagoans according to a survey (relying mostly on Google hits) by the free weekly newspaper, Newcity. Other house music artists making the cut included Felix da Housecat (No. 21) and Frankie Knuckles (No. 41).

Throughout his career, Carter has been associated with various groups, including Conception, Symbols and Instruments, and Tone Theory. His discography includes influential works like "Mood," "Poverty De Luxe," and "Squaredancing in a Roundhouse," along with numerous memorable singles. Carter's impact extends beyond his productions; his DJ sets are celebrated for their creativity and unpredictability, a trait that has earned him a loyal following worldwide.

== Group names ==
- Conception
- Symbols and Instruments
- Tone Theory

== Discography ==
=== Albums ===
- 1989 Mood
- 1996 The Future Sound of Chicago, Vol. 2
- 1996 The Many Shades of Cajual
- 1997 Derrick Carter – The Cosmic Disco
- 1998 Pagan Offering
- 2001 Derrick L. Carter presents: About Now...
- 2002 Squaredancing in a Roundhouse
- 2003 Azuli presents Derrick Carter – Choice – A Collection of Classics
- 2003 Derrick L. Carter – Nearest Hits & Greatest Misses
- 2003 Poverty De Luxe
- 2004 Derrick Carter & Mark Farina – Live at OM
- 2005 Sessions – Mixed by Derrick Carter
- 2010 Fabric 56: Derrick Carter
- 2012 Derrick Carter – House Masters

=== Singles ===
- "Fantasy Girl"
- "We're Gonna Have A Good Time" / "Release Yourself"
- "Cajmere"
- "The Sound Patrol"
- "Shock Therapy"
- "Skylab"
- "Tortoise"
- "Nü Pschidt"
- "Mo Pschidt"
- "Dreaming"
- "The Unterschrift"
- "Where U At?"
- "Red Nail – People"
- "Squaredancing in a Roundhouse"
- "Derrick L. Carter v Freaks – "Legacy"
- "Life is Like a Circle"
