= See the Light (Jessica 6 album) =

Studio album by Jessica 6
- Released: May 10, 2011
- Genre: Dance, synthpop
- Length: 54:56
- Label: Peacefrog Records
- Producer: Paze Infinite, Jessica 6, A.K. Adams

Jessica 6 chronology
See the Light (2011)	The Capricorn (2015)

Professional ratings
Review scores
Source	Rating
The Boston Phoenix	3/4 stars
Clash Music	7/10 stars
Mobo	3/5

See the Light is the debut full-length album from New York synth-pop group Jessica 6, headed by singer Nomi Ruiz.

== Track listing ==
No.	Title	Writer(s)	Length
1.	"White Horse"	Nomi Ruiz	4:59
2.	"See the Light"	Ruiz	4:46
3.	"Prisoner of Love"	Ruiz	4:30
4.	"In the Heat"	Ruiz	4:24
5.	"Jessica Jessica (Interlude)"	Ruiz, Morgan Wiley	1:14
6.	"Freak the Night"	Ruiz	3:38
7.	"Good to Go"	Ruiz	4:09
8.	"Fun Girl"	Ruiz	5:06
9.	"Not Anymore"	Ruiz	2:34
10.	"Champagne Bubbles / Remember When"	Ruiz	3:33
11.	"Blessed Mother"	Ruiz	3:04
12.	"U-Motion"	Ruiz	4:18
13.	"Stars In Your Eyes"	Ruiz	4:52
Total length:			54:56
