= Hercules and Love Affair =

American dance music group

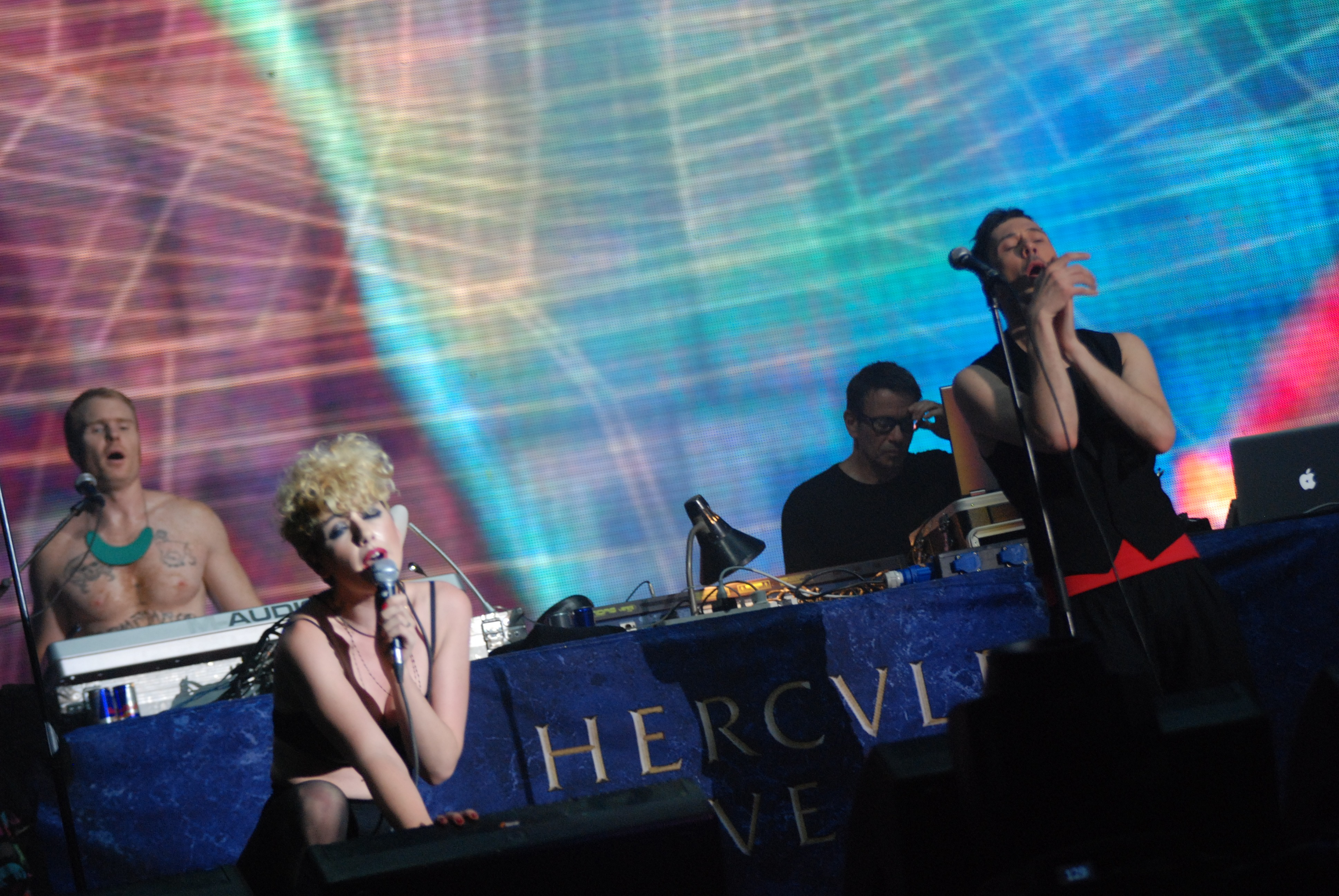
- Hercules and Love Affair performing in 2012

Background information
- Origin: New York City, US
- Genres: Disco; house; nu-disco
- Years active: 2004–present
- Labels: Skint/BMG; Atlantic; DFA; Moshi Moshi; Mute
- Members: Andrew Butler
- Website: www.herculesandloveaffair.net

Hercules and Love Affair is a dance music project created by American DJ, singer, composer, musician and producer Andy Butler in 2004. Consisting of a rotating cast of performers and musicians, the band work within the genres of house music, disco, techno and nu-disco.

Originally based in New York City, now based in Ghent, Belgium, Hercules and Love Affair were founded following Butler's collaboration with Anohni to produce the song "Blind", which was a hit single and became Pitchfork's song of the year. Their 2008 debut album Hercules and Love Affair received widespread critical acclaim. The band recorded Blue Songs in 2011, and then The Feast of the Broken Heart in 2014 which featured John Grant as guest, on the single "I Try To Talk To You". Their fourth album Omnion in 2017 featured singer Sharon Van Etten on the title track.

In 2022, they released their fifth album In Amber with Anohni featuring on several songs; the lead single "Grace" featured Icelandic singer Elin Ey. In Amber received widespread critical acclaim and was named "Album of the Year 2022" by The Arts Desk.

== History ==
=== Origins ===
Andrew Butler was born and raised in Denver, Colorado, and has described growing up in "a violent household without any role models". He developed an early love for Greek mythology, which later inspired him to name his band after the mythological hero of Hercules. Interested in music, he played the piano, and began composing classical pieces from the age of thirteen. Butler's interest switched to focus on dance music after buying a record by the band Yazoo. He went on to give his first DJ set aged fifteen, in a Denver leather bar run by a hostess called Chocolate Thunder Pussy; on that occasion, the club was raided by police, leading him to hide from them in the toilets. As he later related: "I started DJing because I needed to get out of the house. I was, like, 'Take me to the club or there's going to be a really ugly situation at home today!' I found a lot of freedom in the nightclub to express myself and not be judged as harshly as I was at home. I am a gay man and I grew up with a certain struggle and because of that, I have a story to tell."

In the late 1990s, Butler moved to New York City to attend Sarah Lawrence College. In the city, he befriended the musician Anohni—then working under her birth name of Antony Hegarty—and in 2004 convinced her to perform vocals for a song he had written, titled "Blind". At the time, she simply described it as "curious"; however, Butler continued to make adjustments to the demo.

=== 2007–2011: Foundation and debut album ===
'Blind' was about growing up a gay kid, my immediate family and social group rejecting me, and asking why I was born into this situation. But knowing that as soon as I could escape, I would, and that I would find freedom and solace. As an adult, however, I found a life full of excess and other wounded people and confusion. Thus, I felt blind.

— Butler, 2008

In 2007, after Anohni had won the Mercury Prize for her work with Antony and the Johnsons, Butler approached her with the "Blind" demo, and they agreed to release it. Butler decided to do so under the name of Hercules and Love Affair because it reflected his interest in Greco-Roman mythology; it referenced Hercules and his "love affair" with Hylas. According to Butler, "[Hercules] stayed on the island, looking for his boyfriend. I just thought this was super-beautiful: the strongest man on earth looking for his lost love, at his most vulnerable. Strong men can have strong feelings. And they can experience those feelings and experience pain and express pain — and be gay." DFA Records agreed to release the song, with DFA founder Tim Goldsworthy stating that "We had slight reservations that 'Blind' would be a one-hit wonder. But then he played us some bits he had been playing around with at home." The single was first released in the United Kingdom in March 2007, where it made the Top 40. It was awarded Best Song of 2008 by Pitchfork Media and came in at sixth place in Resident Advisor's Top 30 tracks of that year, while Entertainment Weekly called it the second best song of the year.

At this point, Butler decided to establish Hercules and Love Affair as a continuing musical project, stating his intent to release music with a rotating cast of performers and musicians. Their debut album Hercules and Love Affair was released in Europe through DFA's parent company, EMI, in March 2008. For the album, Butler assembled a mixed line-up; Morgan Wiley and Andrew Raposo, both formerly of Automato, joined the backing band, while Nomi Ruiz, CocoRosie, Kim Ann Foxman, and Anohni took up vocals. However, although Anohni would appear on five of the album's tracks, she did not participate in the band's live performances. The band made its live debut on May 17, 2008, at the Studio B venue in Brooklyn, New York, before going on a European and North American tour. Appearing at London's Lovebox Festival in 2010, it was there that they were interviewed by Vogue. After touring for a year, Butler split with his record company and returned to Denver.

=== 2011–2020: Blue Songs, The Feast of the Broken Heart and Omnion ===
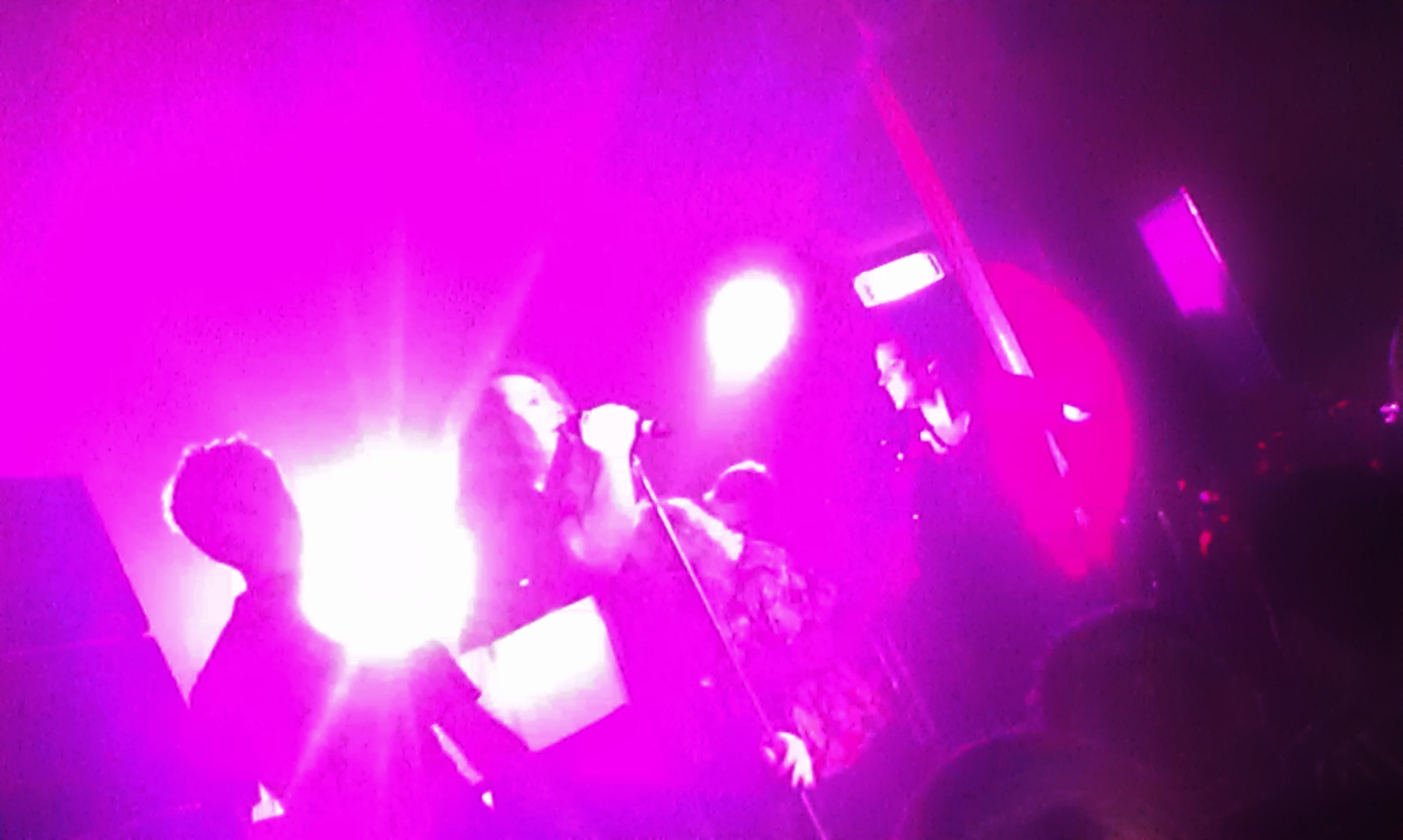
Anohni performing "Blind" as a part of the Hercules and Love Affair collective during the 2012 Meltdown Festival at London's Southbank Centre

Hercules and Love Affair's second album, Blue Songs, was released in 2011. It was brought out by independent British label Moshi Moshi. Butler remained in control, joined by Mark Pistel, and Kim Ann Foxman returned, however it also featured two new main vocalists, Shaun Wright and Aerea Negrot. One of the songs, "Step Up", contained guest vocals from Kele Okereke, the lead singer of indie rock band Bloc Party. The album's title was chosen by Butler to reflect his own "blue period" during adolescence, before he discovered the existence of like-minded people through music.

Shortly after the album's release, Butler attracted the attention of the music press when he informed Out magazine that Madonna should "make an age-appropriate record that still appeals to young people" while being scathing of Lady Gaga, asserting that she was producing "children's music... It's middle-aged gay men dancing around to music for 11-year-old girls." As a result of the stress and pressure of the band's success, Butler began making increased use of drugs, and in an attempt to get clean he moved from New York City to Vienna in Austria. As he told a journalist from The Guardian: "It was a need, because I was going way too fast and I was going to self-destruct. It had to get really bad before it got OK."

In August 2012, Hercules and Love Affair played at the Meltdown Festival at London's Southbank Centre, which was curated by Anohni. For their performance of "Blind", she joined them onstage to provide the vocals; the first time that she had performed the song live with the band. At that performance, they were also joined onstage by singer John Grant, who publicly stated for the first time that he was HIV positive; Butler later stated that "I thought it was one of the bravest things I've ever seen a person do".

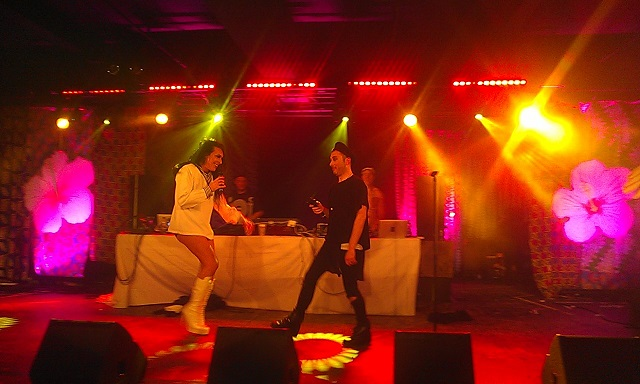
Hercules and Love Affair vocalists Rouge Mary (left) and Gustaph (right) in 2016

The band's third album, The Feast of the Broken Heart, was released by Moshi Moshi in May 2014. Describing the album, Butler stated that "I wanted nasty basslines, stormy, bleary-eyed sounds, fiery, rough, tough and ragged old school house productions that sounded almost techno. I didn't want polite, I wanted aggressive". In a conscious change from the previous two albums, he did not make use of organic instrumentation. When recording the first songs for the album, Butler had stated his intention not to use any well-known vocalists for the album, because he believed that – as with Anohni and Okereke – they would be too busy to tour with the band. However, when the album was released, it received guest vocals from Grant, who sang on "Liberty" and "I Try To Talk To You", in which he dealt with the issue of being HIV positive. Also singing on the album were Rouge Mary, Gustaph, and Krystle Warren, with Butler informing The New York Times that that line-up constituted "the best ensemble of vocalists I've had."

In July 2014, the band performed at East London's Lovebox Festival. In August, the band generated some controversy with the release of the video for their song "My Offence" which featured excerpts of conversation with figures from the New York City gay scene like Honey Dijon and Juliana Huxtable. Butler described the song and its video as an examination of his "relationship to taboo words and the use of 'cunt' amongst NYC's gay community to relay flattery, empowerment and strength". In December 2014, Hercules and Love Affair performed in Thailand at Wonderfruit festival.

In February 2017, Hercules and Love Affair released "Controller", a new single featuring Faris Badwan of The Horrors. It is the first music from the band's fourth studio album Omnion, which was released on September 1, 2017, through Atlantic Records. The title track features a collaboration with vocalist Sharon Van Etten.

=== 2021–present: In Amber ===
Butler heavily worked in 2021 to finish off the recording of the album In Amber. Hercules and Love Affair released "Grace" in February 2022. It featured Icelandic singer Elin Ey with Butler on vocals: it was promoted by a video it was the lead single of In Amber. The album was made in collaboration of Anohni, with whom he had already recorded in 2008. Anohni sang on the single "One" and also did vocals on half of the album. In Amber also featured drummer Budgie, previously of Siouxsie and the Banshees, who was asked "to participate, to derailing some of the arrangements for more impact" on a suggestion of Anohni.

In Amber was finally released in June 2022 on CD and vinyl. The album received glowing reviews. AllMusic rated it four and a half out of five stars. Rolling Stone reviewed the album as "a bracing, at time beautiful, LP of dark art-pop abstraction", and Mojo considered it as "frequently beautiful". The Arts Desk named it "Album of the Year 2022".

== Image and sound ==
Describing the band's 2011 lineup, Elizabeth Day of The Observer described Hercules and Love Affair as "possibly the most disparate bunch ever to come together, call themselves a band and release an album. The five members walk into the room in a blaze of colour and mismatched clothes like a pick'n'mix bag of sweets."

Reviewing a live show at the Oval Space in London in 2014, The Guardian asserted that Hercules and Love Affair's current line-up has reached an apex in terms of their vocal virtuosity.

Rob Ledonne of The New York Times asserted that Hercules and Love Affair have a "distinctly Continental sound" in that they are influenced by European dance music.

Butler has cited OMD, Depeche Mode, Eurythmics, and Yazoo as artists who taught him that dance music could convey emotional depth.

== Awards and nominations ==
Best Art Vinyl

Year	Nominee / work	Award	Result
2008	"Blind" (ft. Anohni)	Best Vinyl Art	Nominated

DJ Awards

Year	Nominee / work	Award	Result	Ref.
2014	Themselves	Best Electronica DJ	Nominated	

GLAAD Media Awards

Year	Nominee / work	Award	Result
2009	Themselves	Outstanding Music Artist	Nominated

Ibiza Music Video Festival

Year	Nominee / work	Award	Result
2017	"Omnion"	Best Colorist	Nominated
2017	"Omnion"	Best VFX	Nominated

International Dance Music Awards

Year	Nominee / work	Award	Result
2009	Themselves	Best Breakthrough Artist (Group)	Nominated
2015	Andy Butler	Best Indie Dance/Underground DJ	Nominated
2015	The Feast of the Broken Heart	Best Full Length Studio Recording	Nominated
2015	"Do You Feel The Same"	Best Indie Dance Track	Nominated

MTV O Music Awards

Year	Nominee / work	Award	Result
2011	Themselves	Best Remix	Nominated

Music Video Festival

Year	Nominee / work	Award	Result	Ref.
2015	"I Try to Talk to You"	Best International Video	Nominated	

Rober Awards Music Prize

Year	Nominee / work	Award	Result	Ref.
2008	Themselves	Best Electronica	Nominated	
2008	"Blind" (ft. Anohni)	Single of the Year	Nominated	
2008	"Blind" (ft. Anohni)	Best Dance Anthem	Won	

UK Festival Awards

Year	Nominee / work	Award	Result	Ref.
2010	Lounge On The Farm	Best Headline Performance	Nominated	

UK Music Video Awards

Year	Nominee / work	Award	Result
2008	"Blind" (ft. Anohni)	Best Pop Video	Nominated
2014	"I Try to Talk to You"	Best Dance Video	Nominated
2014	"I Try to Talk to You"	Best Choreography	Nominated

The Arts Desk: Album of the Year

Year	Nominee / work	Award	Result
2022	"In Amber"	Best album	Won

== Discography ==
=== Albums ===
List of studio albums, with selected chart positions
Title	Album details	Peak chart positions									
Title	Album details	US	AUT	BEL (FL)	GER	ITA	IRE	NOR	SWI	SWE	UK
Hercules and Love Affair	Released: March 10, 2008; Label: DFA; Formats: CD, LP, digital download	191	—	12	—	33	44	18	—	23	31
Blue Songs	Released: January 28, 2011; Label: Moshi Moshi; Formats: CD, LP, digital download	—	57	79	75	—	—	—	89	—	105
The Feast of the Broken Heart	Released: May 26, 2014; Label: Moshi Moshi; Formats: CD, LP, digital download	—	—	72	—	—	—	—	—	—	110
Omnion	Released: September 1, 2017; Label: Atlantic, Big Beat; Formats: CD, LP, digital download	—	—	159	—	—	—	—	—	—	— (Note: Omnion did not enter the UK Albums Chart, but peaked at number 99 on the UK Albums Sales Chart.)
In Amber	Released: June 17, 2022; Label: BMG, Skint; Formats: CD, LP, digital download	—	—	—	—	—	—	—	—	—	— (Note: In Amber did not enter the UK Albums Chart, but peaked at number 98 on the UK Albums Sales Chart.)
"—" denotes a recording that did not chart or was not released in that territory.

=== DJ mixes ===
Title	Details
Sidetracked	Released: July 21, 2009; Label: Renaissance; Formats: CD
DJ-Kicks	Released: October 26, 2012; Label: !K7; Formats: CD, digital download

=== Singles ===
List of singles, with selected chart positions, showing year released and album name
Title	Year	Peak chart positions										Album
Title	Year	US Dance	AUS Dance	BEL (FL)	BEL (FL) Dance	BEL (WA)	HUN	ITA	SCO	UK	UK Dance	Album
"Blind"	2008	22	46	23	2	— (Note: "Blind" did not enter the Walloon Ultratop 50 Singles, but charted as an 22 on the Ultratip chart.)	27	12	22	40	1	Hercules and Love Affair
"You Belong"	2008	39	—	—	—	—	—	—	42	— (Note: "You Belong" did not enter the UK Singles Chart, but peaked at number 35 on the UK Physical Singles Chart.)	4	Hercules and Love Affair
"My House"	2010	—	—	—	—	—	—	—	—	— (Note: "My House" did not enter the UK Singles Chart, but peaked at number 100 on the UK Physical Singles Chart.)	—	Blue Songs
"Painted Eyes"	2011	—	—	—	—	—	—	—	—	— (Note: "Painted Eyes" did not enter the UK Singles Chart, but peaked at number 66 on the UK Physical Singles Chart.)	—	Blue Songs
"Do You Feel the Same?" (featuring Gustaph)	2014	—	—	—	—	—	—	—	—	— (Note: "Do You Feel the Same?" did not enter the UK Singles Chart, but peaked at number 98 on the UK Physical Singles Chart.)	—	The Feast of the Broken Heart
"I Try to Talk to You" (featuring John Grant)	2014	—	—	—	—	—	—	—	—	—	—	The Feast of the Broken Heart
"Controller" (featuring Faris Badwan)	2017	—	—	— (Note: "Controller" did not enter the Flemish Ultratop 50 Singles, but charted as an "extra tip" on the Ultratip chart.)	— (Note: "Controller" did not enter the Ultratop Dance chart, but charted as an 9 on the Dance Bubbling Under chart.)	—	—	—	—	—	—	Omnion
"Omnion" (featuring Sharon Van Etten)	2017	—	—	—	—	—	—	—	—	—	—	Omnion
"Fools Wear Crowns"	2017	—	—	—	—	—	—	—	—	—	—	Omnion
"Rejoice" (featuring Rouge Mary)	2017	—	—	—	—	—	—	—	—	—	—	Omnion
"My Curse And Cure" (featuring Gustaph)	2018	—	—	—	—	—	—	—	—	—	—	Omnion
"Grace"	2022	—	—	—	—	—	—	—	—	—	—	In Amber
"Poisonous Storytelling" (featuring Anohni)	2022	—	—	—	—	—	—	—	—	—	—	In Amber
"One" (featuring Anohni)	2022	—	—	—	—	—	—	—	—	—	—	In Amber
"Dissociation" (featuring Elin Ey)	2022	—	—	—	—	—	—	—	—	—	—	In Amber
"—" denotes a recording that did not chart or was not released in that territory.
