= Steel Hammer =

2009 composition for 3 sopranos and chamber ensemble by Julia Wolfe

Julia Wolfe in 2012

Steel Hammer is a 2009 composition for three sopranos and chamber ensemble by the American composer Julia Wolfe. It was first performed on November 21, 2009, at Zankel Hall by the contemporary classical music groups Bang on a Can and Trio Mediæval. The piece is based on the ballad of the African-American tall tale John Henry. The composition was a finalist for the 2010 Pulitzer Prize for Music.

== Composition ==
The text of the piece is drawn from over 200 versions of the John Henry folklore. Wolfe described her sources in the score program notes, writing:

The various versions—based on hearsay, recollection, and tall tales—explore the subject of human-versus-machine in this quintessential American legend. Many of the facts are unclear; some say John Henry is from West Virginia, others say he’s from South Carolina, still others say he’s from New Jersey. But these ambiguities aside, Henry, wielding a steel hammer, faces the onslaught of the Industrial Age as his superhuman strength is challenged in a contest to out-dig an engine. I drew upon the extreme variations of the story, fragmenting and weaving the contradictory versions of the ballad that have circulated since the late 1800s into a new whole—at times meditating on single words or phrases—to tell the story of the story, and to embody the simultaneous diverse paths it traveled.

=== Structure ===
The piece has a duration of 79 minutes and is composed in nine movements:

1. Some Say
2. The States
3. Destiny
4. Mountain
5. Characteristics
6. Polly Ann
7. The Race
8. Winner
9. Lord Lord

=== Instrumentation ===
The work is scored for an ensemble comprising three sopranos, clarinet, percussion, guitar, piano, cello, and double bass.

== Reception ==
Reviewing the world premiere, of The Washington Post praised the piece as "an astonishingly compelling amalgam" of music and noise. Daniel Stephen Johnson of WQXR-FM said, "At its best, the music of Julia Wolfe is totally relentless, like a steam-powered drill boring a great hole right through the hard heart of a mountain." He added, "A bit like The Little Match Girl Passion of fellow Bang on a Can composer David Lang, this is a passion play for a sort of ordinary Christ figure, and their pure, exquisitely shaped sound lends Wolfe's work not a suitable elegiac tone, but the laserlike intensity demanded by her music's most luminous moments." Allan Kozinn of The New York Times lauded Wolfe's mixture of musical styles and wrote:

The score draws heavily on classic Minimalist moves. Ms. Wolfe's opening movement, "Some Say," breaks down the phrase "Some say he’s from," in ways that recall Steve Reich's early tape pieces "It's Gonna Rain" and "Come Out." But where those works are based on plain speech, Ms. Wolfe turns the repeating words and phrases into sweetly harmonized vocal lines. Oscillating minor thirds and cycling, syncopated rhythms turn up elsewhere in the piece. But Ms. Wolfe's musical language reaches well beyond Minimalism. The third movement, "Destiny," is couched in dark dissonances that veer on cacophony. "Characteristics" is underpinned by what might have been a flamenco rhythm, stamped out by Mark Stewart. Mr. Stewart otherwise provided banjo and dulcimer lines that injected a bluegrass sound into this wild hybrid, and gentle electric guitar figures that added a hint of spookiness. And in the finale, "Lord Lord," the vocal lines sounded like plainchant, briefly.

== Theatrical adaptation ==
Director Anne Bogart and SITI Company created a theatrical version of Steel Hammer, with text by Kia Corthron, Will Power, Carl Hancock Rux, and Regina Taylor, which premiered as a play at the 2014 Humana Festival of New American Plays. A full version with the Bang on a Can All-stars premiered at the Krannert Center for the Performing Arts in September, 2015.
