= Crotales =

Percussion instrument

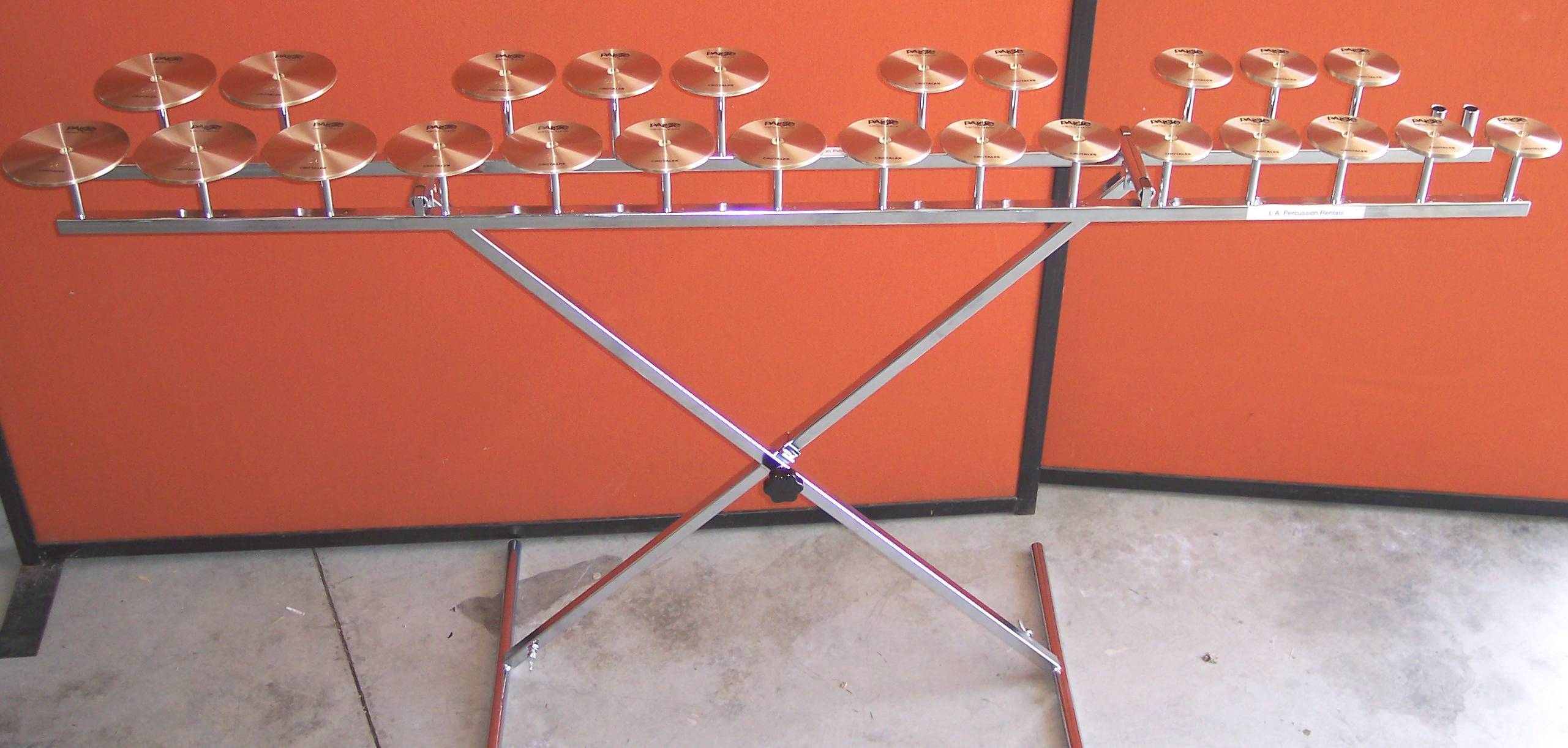
- Crotales, C_{6}–C_{8} range, by Paiste

Percussion instrument
- Classification: Percussion
- Hornbostel–Sachs classification: 111.22 (Percussion plaques)

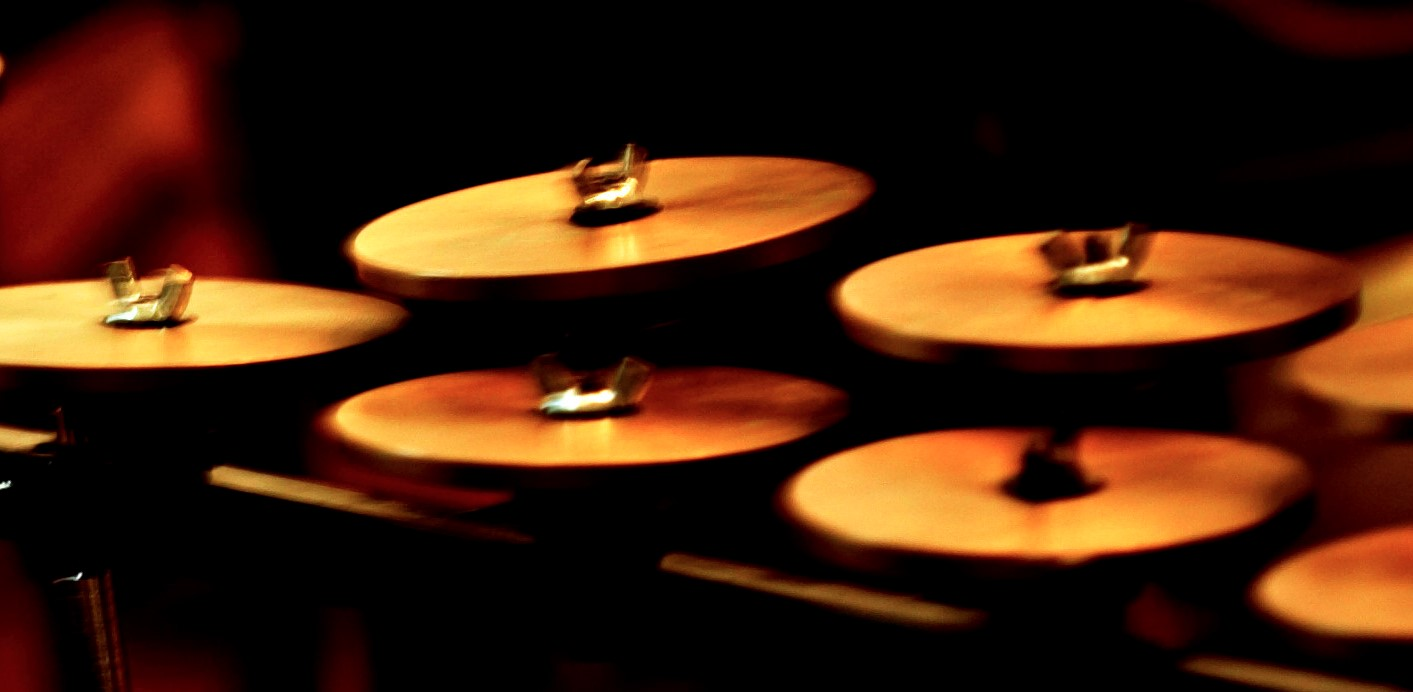
Closeup

Crotales (/ˈkroʊtɑːlz/, /ˈkroʊtəlz/), sometimes called antique cymbals, are percussion instruments consisting of small, tuned bronze or brass disks. Each is about 10 cm (4 in) in diameter with a flat top surface and a nipple on the base. They are commonly played by being struck with hard mallets. However, they may also be played by striking two disks together in the same manner as finger cymbals, or by bowing. Their sound is rather like a small tuned bell, only with a much brighter sound and a much longer resonance. Similar to tuned finger cymbals, crotales are thicker and larger; they also have slight grooves in them. The name comes from the Greek crotalon, for a castanet or rattle.

Modern crotales are arranged chromatically and have a range of up to two octaves. They are typically available in sets (commonly one octave) but may also be purchased individually. Crotales are treated as transposing instruments; music for crotales is written two octaves lower than the sounding pitch to minimize ledger lines.

== Uses ==
One of the earliest uses of crotales in the orchestral repertoire is Hector Berlioz's Roméo et Juliette (1839). Other classical pieces featuring crotales include Claude Debussy's Prélude à l'après-midi d'un faune, Maurice Ravel's orchestration of his Alborada del gracioso and Henri Dutilleux's Cello Concerto.

The contemporary American composer John Adams uses them in many of his more colorful orchestral pieces such as Short Ride in a Fast Machine. Composer Julia Wolfe uses crotales in her oratorio Fire in my mouth.

Crotales are also found in popular music, particularly in rock music. Neil Peart of Rush used them as part of his basic drum kit for several years, featuring them in the introduction to the instrumental "YYZ", and Alan White of Yes used them in the middle instrumental section of "Awaken" from Going for the One. The Bengsons use them in the instrumentation of their Off-Broadway show "Hundred Days." Wilco drummer Glenn Kotche uses them live on the Yankee Hotel Foxtrot song "I Am Trying to Break Your Heart".
