= Robert Black (bassist) =

- Born: March 16, 1956; Denver, Colorado, U.S.
- Died: June 22, 2023 (aged 67) Hartford, Connecticut, U.S.
- Genres: Classical
- Instruments: Upright bass, electric bass

Robert Alan Black (March 16, 1956 – June 22, 2023) was an American double bassist, electric bassist, improvisor, and educator.

== Life and career ==
Black was born on March 16, 1956. A student of Gary Karr, Black performed with the Hartford Symphony Orchestra, the Ciompi and Miami String Quartets and the orchestras of the Monadock and Moab Festivals. He was a founding member of the Bang on a Can All Stars. As a solo and chamber musician, Black collaborated with and commissioned artists as diverse as John Cage, Evan Ziporyn, Julia Wolfe, Michael Gordon, David Lang, Meredith Monk, and DJ Spooky, amidst a slew of others.

Black lived in Hartford, Connecticut, and was on the faculty of the University of Hartford Hartt School and the Manhattan School of Music. He died from colon cancer in Hartford, on June 22, 2023, at the age of 67.
