= KJ Sanchez =

American actress

KJ Sanchez (born Karen June Sanchez) is an American theatre actor, director, and playwright. She is currently an associate professor at The University of Texas at Austin, where she serves as head of the MFA Directing program.

Sanchez is the founder/CEO of American Records As a playwright, she has been produced at Actors Theater of Louisville, Berkeley Repertory Theater, Two River Theater, Baltimore’s CENTERSTAGE, off-Broadway at Urban Stages, and Round House Theater, among others. She has directed plays by Dan Dietz, Kyle Schmidt, Heather Raffo, Jose Rivera, Quiara Alegría Hudes, and Kristoffer Diaz.

As an actress, she has been on stages at The Humana Festival of New Plays, The Goodman Theater, Berkeley Repertory Theater, Long Wharf Theater, New York Theatre Workshop and Brooklyn Academy of Music. She is also the voice of many characters in the Nickelodeon cartoons Dora the Explorer and Go, Diego, Go!.

As the producer, director and co-author (with Emily Ackerman) of ReEntry, a play based on interviews with Marines returning from Iraq and Afghanistan, KJ produced its international tour and contracted with the United States Department of Defense, taking the play to service members at over thirty military bases and hospitals throughout the US and internationally. KJ is a former member of Anne Bogart’s SITI Company, an Associate Artist with The Civilians, a Fox Fellow, Douglas Wollop Fellow, Albert Award Nominee, an NEA CDP recipient and a TCG Doris Duke/Andrew W. Mellon Foundation New Generations Future Leaders Recipient.

== Life and career ==
Sanchez was born and raised in Tome, New Mexico, where she attended Belen public school. She earned her Bachelor of Arts degree from the University of California, San Diego in 1989, followed by a Master of Fine Arts degree in Theatre – also from UCSD – in 1992. Sanchez started her theater career as an actor. She played Juliet and Ophelia at the Actors Theater of Louisville, both productions directed by Jon Jory. She also worked extensively with Anne Bogart’s SITI Company and was a company member from 1994-1997. With SITI Company, Sanchez played Mille Owen in Picnic, Hermia in A Midsummer Night’s Dream, Sibyl in Private Lives (all directed by Anne Bogart), and more.

In 2000, Sanchez originated the role of Thyona in the world premiere of Charles Mee’s Big Love(Humana Festival) and went on to perform the play at Long Wharf, Berkeley Repertory Theater, The Goodman and Brooklyn Academy of Music.

In 2001, Sanchez shifted her focus to writing and directing – she made Too Much Water (a devised piece about Shakespeare’s Ophelia, madness, and suicide) at the University of Washington. The next year, also at the University of Washington, Sanchez made Panaphobia, a play based on interviews about phobias and fears and the culture of fear in America.

From there, Sanchez went on to create Handcuff Girl Saves the World with the Ensemble at Washington Ensemble Theater. Sanchez then wrote Highway 47, an autobiographical piece exploring the history of her hometown and an inter-family land feud that nearly destroyed both clan and community. Highway 47 began as an ensemble play produced by Working Classroom in Albuquerque, New Mexico; it was later rewritten as a solo play, commissioned by Two River Theater and performed by Sanchez. The solo version of Highway 47 was produced by Yo Solo Festival, HERE, and Frontera Rep (with another actress playing Sanchez).

Cornerstone Theatre commissioned Sanchez to write For All Time, and in 2008, they produced the play about America’s criminal justice system.

The following year, Life in the Middle was commissioned and produced by Asolo Repertory Theater and Two River Theater Company. Based on interviews with real students, Life in the Middle is a musical designed for actors in middle school to perform with their own rock band.

== American Records ==
In 2010, Sanchez founded American Records, a theater company with the mission “to make plays that chronicle our time, plays that serve as a bridge between people.” In line with this mission, American Records often makes documentary plays based on interviews conducted by Sanchez and other company members.

American Records first developed ReEntry, a play Sanchez co-wrote with Emily Ackerman. ReEntry is “an unflinching look at the lives of Marines getting ready for and returning from deployment, ReEntry is a docudrama exploration of the challenges faced when re-entering family, community and country. Honest, moving, and surprisingly funny, this play is based entirely on interviews with Marines and their families.” ReEntry was commissioned and produced by Two River Theater Company, and received further productions at Urban Stages, Baltimore’s CENTERSTAGE, Round House Theater Company, Actors Theater of Louisville, and more. In addition to these productions, ReEntry also tours and, through American Records, works directly with the military. The United States Department of Defense uses the play as post-deployment resiliency training, for which the company goes to bases and performs the play followed by town-hall and break-out discussions with base chaplains, social workers, psychiatrists and therapists. ReEntry has toured to over 50 military bases, hospitals, and VA centers in the US and abroad.

With Jenny Mercein, Sanchez was co-commissioned by Berkeley Repertory Theater and CENTERSTAGE to create X’s and O’s (a football love story), a docudrama exploring American identity and ritual, football, and the game’s traumatic effect on players and their families. Berkeley Rep produced the world premiere, directed by Tony Tacconi.

American Records is an S Corporation, of which Sanchez is the owner and CEO. The company works under the fiscal sponsorship of Fractured Atlas and is pioneering a new model for theater company operation; all the money made by American Records in earned and contributed revenue goes directly to pay artists fees and productions costs. As a result, the company has very little overhead and is able to reach a wider variety of theaters and audiences. Sanchez designed a model for touring flexibility that allows plays to be produced in new ways and tour to a multitude of venues.

American Records also regularly collaborates with other theaters, often making projects for specific communities as well as helping theaters with community engagement and outreach. A current project is Cincinnati King, which documents the King Records label and its founder, Syd Nathan. King Records was one of the first racially integrated businesses in Cincinnati and was a revolutionary presence in the music industry for two decades starting in the 1940s, “making enormous contributions” to the birth of Rock and Roll.
