= Maya Beiser =

American musician

Maya Beiser in 2006

Maya Beiser (born 31 December 1963) is an American musician, cellist, performing artist and producer who lives in New York City. Beiser was raised on a kibbutz in Israel by her French mother and Argentine father, and graduated from Yale University School of Music. She has been described by the Boston Globe as "a force of nature", "a cello goddess" by The New Yorker and "the reigning queen of the avant-garde cello" by The Washington Post. Beiser is a 2015 United States Artists Distinguished Music Fellow and the Inaugural Mellon Distinguished Visiting Artist at the MIT Center for Art, Science & Technology.

== Biography ==
Maya Beiser was born 31 December 1963 in Gazit, a kibbutz in Israel. Her mother was French, her father Argentinian. As a child, she played the piano before switching to the cello. At age twelve, she was discovered by the violinist Isaac Stern and embarked on a solo career. Beiser graduated from Yale University School of Music in 1987. She collaborated with composers Louis Andriessen, Steve Reich, David Lang, Tan Dun, Brian Eno, Philip Glass, Osvaldo Golijov, Michael Gordon, Michael Harrison, Julia Wolfe, Mark Anthony Turnage, visual artists Shirin Neshat, and Bill Morrison, dancer Wendy Whelan and choreographer Lucinda Childs. Beiser was a speaker at the 2011 TED conference in Long Beach California. Her TEDtalk performance has been watched by over a million people and translated to 34 languages.

Beiser has conceived, performed and produced three multimedia concerts for Carnegie Hall: World To Come; Almost Human, a collaboration with visual artist Shirin Neshat and composer Eve Beglarian; and Provenance, which forms the basis of her album of that name. Her production, Elsewhere: a CelloOpera, which premiered at Brooklyn Academy of Music in 2012, is an imaginative retelling of the Biblical legend of Lot's wife, created with theater director Robert Woodruff, with original text by Erin Cressida Wilson and music by Missy Mazzoli. All Vows, a show that reimagines rock classics such as Led Zeppelin's "Black Dog" and Nirvana's "Lithium", premiered at the San Francisco's Yerba Buena Center for the Arts in 2014 and was presented at BAM Next Wave Festival in 2015. In July 2017, she performed a reimagining of David Bowie's album "Blackstar", arranged for her by the composer Evan Ziporyn with the Barcelona Symphony and Catalonia National Orchestra and Ziporyn conducting. In August 2018, Beiser premiered Mark Anthony Turnage cello concerto "Maya" at The Proms in London's Royal Albert Hall.

Maya Beiser's discography includes fourteen solo albums, multiple studio recordings and film music collaborations. She has collaborated with film composer James Newton Howard and is the featured soloist on several films' soundtracks including The Happening, The Great Debaters, Blood Diamond, Snow White and the Huntsman and After Earth.

Beiser was one of the founding members of the Bang on a Can All Stars.

== Projects ==
- THE DAY
- Spinning
- Films For Cello
- Uncovered
- All Vows
- Elsewhere: A CelloOpera
- Provenance
- World To Come

== Discography ==
- 1994 The Cello Music of Gubaidulina and Ustvolskaya (KOCH International Classics)
- 1999 Oblivión (KOCH International Classics)
- 2000 Caught by Sky with Wire The Maya Beiser / Steven Schick Project (oodiscs inc)
- 2000 Kinship (KOCH International Classics)
- 2003 World to Come (KOCH International Classics)
- 2007 Almost Human (KOCH International Classics)
- 2010 Provenance (Innova)
- 2012 Time Loops with Michael Harrison (Cantaloupe Music 21086)
- 2014 Uncovered (Innova)
- 2016 TranceClassical (Innova)
- 2018 The Day, with Kate Valk (spoken voice)
- 2019 delugEON
- 2020 Bowie Cello Symphonic: Blackstar
- 2021 Maya Beiser x Philip Glass
- 2023 Maya Beiser: InfInIte BachMaya Beiser | Infinite Bach Chapter 1 - Cello Suite No 4 in E♭ major, Prélude
- 2025 Maya Beiser x Terry Riley: In C (Islandia Music Records)
- 2025 Salt (Islandia Music Records)

== Other contributions ==
- 1995 Industry, (Sony Classical) album by Bang On a Can All Stars, as solo electric cellist
- 1996 CHEATING. LYING. STEALING. (Sony Classical)
- 1998 BRIAN ENO: MUSIC FOR AIRPORTS
- 2002 BANG ON A CAN CLASSICS (Cantaloupe)
- 2005 You Are (Variations)/Cello Counterpoint (Nonesuch Records), album by Steve Reich, as solo cellist
- 2021 The Brandenburg Project

== Filmography ==
Beiser contributed to the soundtrack of several films:

- Blood Diamond (2006), directed by Edward Zwick
- The Great Debaters (2007), directed by Denzel Washington
- The Happening (2008), directed by M. Night Shyamalan
- Snow White and the Huntsman (2012), directed by Rupert Sanders
- After Earth (2013), directed by M. Night Shyamalan, soundtrack by James Newton Howard
- La grande bellezza (2013), directed by Paolo Sorrentino
