= Flower power (disambiguation) =

Flower power is a slogan.

Flower Power may also refer to:

== Art ==
- "Flower Power" (photograph), 1967 photograph by Bernie Boston

== Television ==
- "Flower Power", an episode of The Backyardigans
- "Flower Power" (Doctors), a 2004 episode
- "Flower Power", an episode of Pucca television series
- "Flower Power", an episode of the sitcom The King of Queens
- "Flower Power", a live-action episode of The Super Mario Bros. Super Show!

== Music ==
=== Albums ===
- Flower Power (The Flower Kings album), 1999
- Flower Power (Callalily album), 2012

=== Compositions ===
- Flower Power (Wolfe), 2020 composition for amplified ensemble and orchestra

=== Songs ===
- "Flower Power", 1967 CBS debut single of Mud (band)
- "Flower Power", Ibiza dance instrumental by the duo Flower Power (Andrea Jeannin and Stefano Mazzacani), adapted as "You Won't Forget About Me" by Dannii Minogue
- "Flower Power" (song), 2012, by Girls' Generation
- "Flower Power", a song by John Scofield from the 1990 album Time on My Hands
- "Flower Power", a song by Zazie from the 2007 album Totem

== Other uses ==
- "Flower Power", the energy drink brand of Canadian hockey player Guy Lafleur
- Flower Power Garden Centre, an Australian chain of garden centres

== See also ==
- Flower Plower, an album by the band Poster Children
- "Power Flower", a song by Stevie Wonder from the 1979 album Stevie Wonder's Journey Through "The Secret Life of Plants"
- Power flower, an item in the video game Super Mario 64 DS
