= Cruel Sister =

Cruel Sister may refer to:

- Cruel Sister (Pentangle album)
- Cruel Sister (Rachel Unthank and the Winterset album)
- Cruel Sister (Wolfe), a 2004 composition for string orchestra by Julia Wolfe
- "The Cruel Sister" or "The Twa Sisters”, a Northumbrian murder ballad
