= Her Story (composition) =

2022 composition for 10 vocalists and orchestra by Julia Wolfe

Her Story is a composition for 10 women's voices and orchestra by the American composer Julia Wolfe. The work was commissioned by a consortium of orchestras including the Boston Symphony Orchestra, Chicago Symphony Orchestra, Nashville Symphony, National Symphony Orchestra, and San Francisco Symphony. Its world premiere was performed by the Nashville Symphony and Lorelei Ensemble conducted by Giancarlo Guerrero at the Schermerhorn Symphony Center on September 15, 2022.

== Composition ==
Her Story lasts about 40 minutes in performance and is cast in two sections: "Foment" and "Raise." The piece was written to commemorate the centennial of the ratification of the Nineteenth Amendment to the United States Constitution. The text was compiled by Wolfe from the letters of Abigail Adams to her husband John Adams, Sojourner Truth's "Ain't I a Woman?" speech, and the words various anti-suffragists used to describe the suffrage movement.

=== Instrumentation ===
The work is scored for 10 women's voices and a large orchestra comprising three flutes (doubling piccolo), three oboes, three clarinets (doubling bass clarinet), three bassoons (doubling contrabassoon), four horns, three trumpets (in C), two trombones, bass trombone, tuba, timpani, four percussionists, electric guitar, electric bass guitar, piano, harp, and strings.

== Reception ==
Reviewing the world premiere, Joshua Barone of The New York Times praised the piece, writing, "Wolfe's style of clear, direct vocal expression landed with unmissable impact. Her orchestral writing, meanwhile, pulsed with Minimalist gestures—phrases that repeatedly swirled upward, steady rhythmic support in the strings—while also nodding to grooving rock in drum kits and electric guitars. And when the score swerves from its Minimalist influences, it's to arresting, moving effect. Violins deliver harmonic glissandos that echo in the vocal treatment of the word 'husband,' which warps, melting downward. Wolfe shatters the rhythmic unison of her singers with dense, overwhelming fogs of phrases that return to unity with new focus and force."

However, Joshua Kosman of the San Francisco Chronicle was more critical of the piece. Reviewing the West Coast premiere performed by Guerrero and the San Francisco Symphony, he wrote, "Her Story registered as a series of generalized gestures in the direction of its subject matter, circling the topic of women's suffrage without ever really landing a punch. Again and again, Wolfe leans on a handful of weighty words—most notably quotations from Abigail Adams and Sojourner Truth—to carry the argument forward, and each time those words fall flat." He added, "The staging of director Anne Kauffman, a series of hieroglyphic poses and reconfigured stances, doesn't do much to sharpen the focus. Nor does Wolfe's thick orchestral score, in which the acerbic brilliance of Anthracite Fields gives way to noodling minor harmonies and soupy instrumental textures." Lisa Hirsch of the San Francisco Classical Voice similarly described the piece as "an angry, unrelenting work," remarking, "As a whole, Her Story lacks contrast and variety. The relentlessness must be a deliberate choice, but it makes the work wearing to hear."
