= SITI Company =

Ensemble-based theater active from 1992 to 2022

- Saratoga International Theater Institute Company
- Formation: 1992
- Founders: Anne Bogart; Tadashi Suzuki
- Dissolved: 2022
- Type: Theater company Drama school
- Location(s): New York City and Saratoga Springs, New York
- Artistic director(s): Anne Bogart; Leon Ingulsrud; Ellen Lauren
- Affiliations: Skidmore College
- Website: SITI

SITI Company (founded as the Saratoga International Theater Institute, or SITI) was an ensemble-based theater company based in New York City and Saratoga Springs, New York. SITI was founded in 1992 by American director Anne Bogart and Japanese director Tadashi Suzuki, on the campus of Skidmore College to redefine and revitalize contemporary theater in the United States.

A permanent ensemble of actors and designers, SITI Company was known for their rigorous approach to training and a physical acting style. Their performances were often new interpretations of classics, or original works devised by company members and collaborators, including playwright Charles L. Mee, who became a member of the company, and dramaturg Jocelyn Clarke. These pieces were often about twentieth century artists, and they frequently collaborated with artists in other fields.

== History ==
In the 1980s, Suzuki's work and training practices were gaining some prominence in the United States. Suzuki's works had begun to be presented in the U.S., attracting some American actors to Japan to study with the Suzuki Company of Toga (SCOT). In 1988, Bogart joined a delegation of American theater directors organized by Peter Zeisler of Theatre Communications Group that visited Suzuki and SCOT in the village of Toga, Japan.

After Bogart departed Trinity Repertory Company in 1990, she began planning what would become SITI with Suzuki. In a founding manifesto, Bogart and Suzuki wrote that the purpose of the Institute would be "to foster and develop new work for the theater and to be a cultural center where new approaches to theater for the next century are developed and put into practice." SITI's "guiding principle" was stated as "the growth of individual artists and the development of a new approach to world theater."

The institute's inaugural season was held in September 1992 in Saratoga Springs, New York, consisting of two adaptations of Euripides. Suzuki directed both American and Japanese actors in Dionysus, from The Bacchae, at Skidmore College, and Orestes by Charles L. Mee, directed by Bogart, was performed at the Spa Little Theatre. Both shows were also performed in the 1992 Toga Festival. Funding initially came from the Japan-United States Friendship Commission, Arts International and All Nippon Airways, according to then-executive producing director Stephen Nisbet.

The Institute expanded from its summer season in Saratoga to encompass a year-round program based in New York City and became known as the SITI Company. The company believed that contemporary American theater must incorporate artists from around the world and learn from a cross-cultural exchange of dance, music, art, and performance experiences.

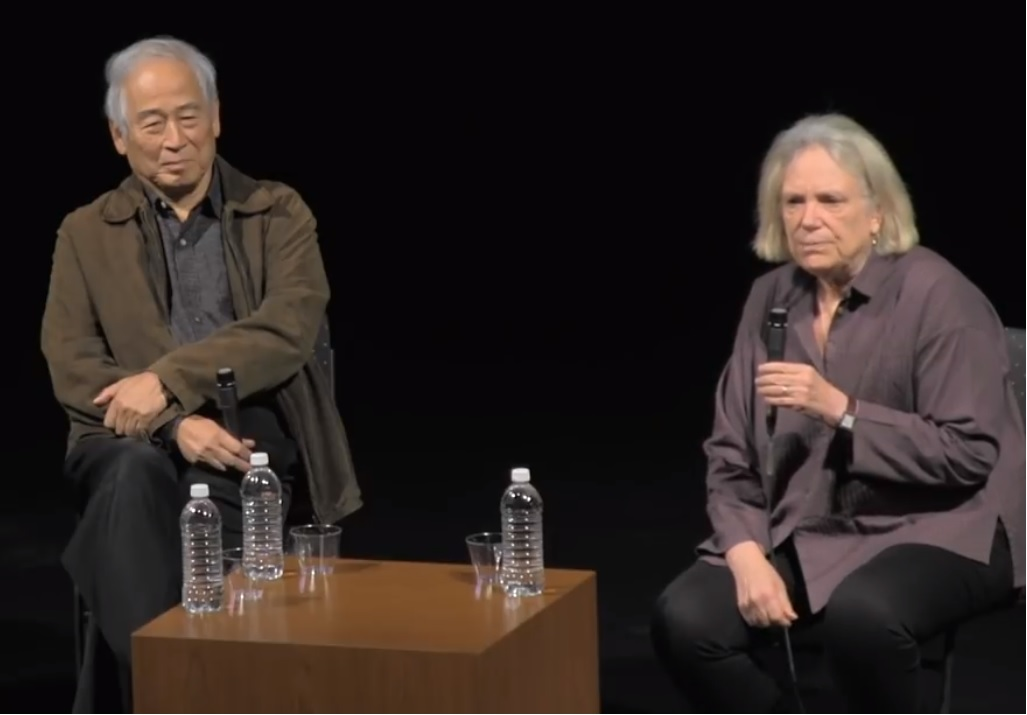
Co-founders Tadashi Suzuki (left) and Anne Bogart in 2017

Over their history, the company created and performed more than forty shows. Many of these were original works, made by the performers writers, designers, and directors working together in a collaborative process, though a handful were stagings of existing works for regional theater and opera companies. Several original shows were made in collaboration with artists and companies in other disciplines, such as American Document (2010) with the Martha Graham Dance Company. Other notable collaborators include visual artist Ann Hamilton, the Bill T. Jones/Arnie Zane Dance Company, composer Julia Wolfe and Bang on a Can All-Stars, and choreographer Elizabeth Streb.

SITI Company toured their work extensively, both nationally and internationally. They presented shows 12 times at the Actors Theatre of Louisville, often as part of the Humana Festival of New American Plays. They performed at theaters and performing arts centers including the Brooklyn Academy of Music, Walker Art Center, Saratoga Performing Arts Center, Wexner Center for the Arts, New York Theatre Workshop, Guthrie Theater, and Getty Villa. They showed work at festivals including the Theatre Olympics, Venice Biennale, Edinburgh International Festival, and Holland Festival.

In October 2020, SITI announced they would "transition" away from being a producing organization, a process they began in 2017, after their final productions in 2022, though they planned to continue offering classes. At the end of 2022, SITI Company ceased both production and training activity.

Their final performances were of an original adaptation of A Christmas Carol at Bard College's Fisher Center. SITI maintains an online archive of digital materials on their website, while their physical archive has been transferred to the Jerome Lawrence and Robert E. Lee Theatre Research Institute.

In addition to Bogart, who was co-artistic director alongside Leon Ingulsrud and Ellen Lauren, other members included playwright Charles Mee, scenic designer Neil Patel, and Tony Award-winning sound designer Darron L. West. Actors Jefferson Mays and KJ Sanchez were former members.

== Training ==
SITI is noted for combining the Viewpoints process of Anne Bogart with the Suzuki Method of Actor Training of Tadashi Suzuki. Both techniques are alternatives to the Stanislavski-based Method training which has dominated American stage and screen for generations. In SITI classes, company members who were not teaching would train alongside students.

The company convened an annual four-week workshop at Skidmore College, from 1992 until 2020, enrolling 60 students annually. In response to the COVID-19 pandemic, the workshops were held virtually, including the final summer intensive in 2022. SITI also held workshops in New York City, and short-term residencies and workshops while on tour.

In 2013, SITI Company launched a year-round conservatory program, which also offered training in Alexander technique, dramaturgy, and scene study.

== Productions ==
Most productions directed by Anne Bogart, except where otherwise noted. Sourced from the SITI Company Digital Archive

- Orestes adapted from Euripides by Charles L. Mee (1992)
- Dionysus adapted from Euripides with the Suzuki Company of Toga (SCOT) (1992)
- The Medium inspired by Marshall McLuhan (1993, 2022)
- Small Lives/Big Dreams adapted from the plays of Anton Chekhov (1994)
- Going, Going, Gone (1995)
- Miss Julie at the Actors Theatre of Louisville (1997)
- Culture of Desire inspired by Andy Warhol (1997)
- Bob inspired by Robert Wilson (1998)
- Alice's Adventures adapted from Lewis Carroll by Jocelyn Clarke (1998)
- Seven Deadly Sins with the New York City Opera (1998)
- Cabin Pressure adapted from the works of Edward Albee and Noël Coward (1999)
- War of the Worlds - The Radio Play adapted from the radio drama, directed by Bogart and Darron L. West (2000)
- War of the Worlds by Naomi Iizuka (2000)
- Room based on the writing of Virginia Woolf, adapted by Jocelyn Clarke (2000)
- bobrauschenbergamerica by Charles L. Mee (2001)
- Lilith by Deborah Drattell with the New York City Opera (2001)
- Hay Fever by Noël Coward (2002)
- Score inspired by Leonard Bernstein (2002)
- La Dispute by Pierre de Marivaux (2003)
- Nicholas and Alexandra by Deborah Drattell with the Los Angeles Opera (2003)
- systems/layers with Rachel's (2004)
- A Midsummer Night's Dream (2004)
- Death and The Ploughman by Johannes von Tepl translated by Michael West (2004)
- Intimations for Saxophone by Sophie Treadwell adapted by Michael Kinghorn (2005)
- Hotel Cassiopeia with Charles L. Mee, inspired by Joseph Cornell (2006)
- Radio Macbeth directed by Bogart and Darron L. West (2007)
- Who Do You Think You Are with Ann Hamilton (2008)
- Freshwater by Virginia Woolf (2009)
- Under Construction by Charles L. Mee, inspired by Norman Rockwell and Jason Rhoades (2009)
- Antigone adapted by Jocelyn Clarke (2009)
- American Document with the Martha Graham Dance Company (2010)
- Trojan Women (After Euripides) adapted by Jocelyn Clarke (2011)
- Café Variations by Charles L. Mee, inspired by George and Ira Gershwin (2012)
- A Rite inspired by The Rite of Spring with the Bill T. Jones/Arnie Zane Dance Company (2013)
- Steel Hammer by Julia Wolfe with the Bang on a Can All-Stars (2014)
- the theater is a blank page with Ann Hamilton (2015)
- Lost in the Stars with the Los Angeles Chamber Orchestra (2017)
- Chess Match No. 5 inspired by Marcel Duchamp and John Cage, text by Jocelyn Clarke (2017)
- Hanjo by Yukio Mishima directed and trans. by Leon Ingulsrud (2017)
- The Bacchae trans. by Aaron Poochigian (2018)
- FALLING & LOVING with Streb Extreme Action (2019)
- Three Sisters adapted by Sarah Ruhl with Nine Years Theatre, directed by Nelson Chia and Darron L. West (2021)
- A Radio Christmas Carol from Charles Dickens directed by Bogart and Darron L. West (2022)
