= Flower Power (Wolfe) =

Musical composition for chamber ensemble and orchestra

Julia Wolfe in 2012

Flower Power is a composition for amplified chamber ensemble and orchestra written by the American composer Julia Wolfe. The work was commissioned by the Los Angeles Philharmonic and the Danish National Symphony Orchestra. Its world premiere was performed by the Los Angeles Philharmonic and members of the Bang on a Can All Stars ensemble conducted by John Adams at the Walt Disney Concert Hall, Los Angeles, on January 18, 2020.

== Composition ==
Flower Power is cast in one continuous movement and has a duration of roughly 34 minutes. The piece was inspired by elements of the 1960s counterculture movement and thus bears the title of the eponymous slogan that came to symbolize it. In the score program note, Wolfe described the piece as "about optimism, idealism, psychedelia, breaking with convention, and a little bit of love and peace." She added, "Flower Power draws on my memory of that political and artistic time period, harnessing the energy and power of liberation and activism."

=== Instrumentation ===
The work is scored for an amplified solo ensemble and large orchestra. The ensemble consists of six instruments: a clarinet (doubling bass clarinet), electric guitar (doubling acoustic guitar), electric organ (doubling piano), drum set (doubling vibraphone), cello, and double bass. The orchestra comprises two flutes, two oboes, two clarinets, two bassoons (2nd doubling contrabassoon), four horns, three trumpets, three trombones, timpani, two percussionists, harp, and strings.

== Reception ==
Reviewing the world premiere, Mark Swed of the Los Angeles Times described Flower Power as a "a rock ‘n’ roll-ish concerto." He wrote, "The rocking comes in complicated, intricate ways that require as much attending to as, say, Miles Davis' concerts at the Fillmore did. When Mark Stewart's bluesy electric guitar wails, the hint is of the creamy textures of Cream. Ken Thomson on his clarinets might be Charles Lloyd loving-in. [...] Climaxes build and fade, build bigger and fade, joyous but with an edge." Falling James of LA Weekly also praised the work, saying that it "evokes the '60s spirit of rebellion and change without relying on the usual musical clichés associated with the decade."

Reviewing the U.K. premiere performance by the Bang on a Can All Stars and the RTÉ Concert Orchestra conducted by Ilan Volkov, Adrian Smith of The Journal of Music remarked, "While the playing of the ensemble had a wonderful quasi-improvisational freedom, the piece somehow managed to maintain a forceful sense of direction and the tension never wavered."
