= UnEarth (Wolfe) =

Composition by Julia Wolfe

Julia Wolfe in 2012

unEarth is a 2023 composition for solo soprano, men's chorus, children's chorus, and orchestra written by the American composer Julia Wolfe. The work was commissioned by the New York Philharmonic as part of a series of ecologically themed programs. Its world premiere was performed by the soprano Else Torp, The Crossing, the Young People's Chorus of New York City, and the New York Philharmonic conducted by Jaap van Zweden at David Geffen Hall on June 1, 2023.

== Composition ==
unEarth has a duration of roughly 45 minutes and is cast in three movements:

1. Flood
2. Forest
3. Fix It

The text of the first movement consists of lines about the formation of Earth from the Book of Genesis. The second movement features the word "tree" spoken in various languages and includes portions from the Emily Dickinson poem "Who Robbed the Woods." The final movement quotes various "language from the science of climate change, words of protest, and thoughts gathered from conversations on climate change."

=== Instrumentation ===
The work is scored for solo soprano, men's chorus, children's chorus, and an orchestra consisting of three flutes (doubling piccolo), three oboes, English horn, two clarinets, bass clarinet, two bassoons, contrabassoon, four horns, three trumpets, two trombones, bass trombone, tuba, timpani, four percussionists, electric bass guitar, piano, electric organ, harp, and strings.

== Reception ==
Reviewing the world premiere, Kevin Ng of the Financial Times described unEarth as "Wolfe's most directly political work yet" and gave it a lukewarm review, writing, "The concept may sound dreadfully self-righteous, but it ends up being a compelling, if imperfect, theatrical experience." Seth Colter Walls of The New York Times similarly described the music as "powerful mix of sonorities," but found the multimedia elements distracting and wrote, "The music was an impassioned litany; the multimedia amounted to a listicle."
