= Fountain of Youth (Wolfe) =

2019 orchestral composition by Julia Wolfe

Julia Wolfe in 2012

Fountain of Youth is an orchestral composition written in 2019 by the American composer Julia Wolfe. The music was commissioned by the New World Symphony and Carnegie Hall, with additional support from a consortium of orchestras including the Dallas Symphony Orchestra, the Cincinnati Symphony Orchestra, the Pittsburgh Symphony Orchestra, the Detroit Symphony Orchestra, and the San Francisco Symphony. Its world premiere was performed by the New World Symphony conducted by Michael Tilson Thomas at the New World Center in Miami Beach, Florida, on April 26, 2019.

== Composition ==
Fountain of Youth is written in a single movement and has a duration of about 9 minutes. The piece was titled as a tribute to the young musicians of the New World Symphony. Regarding the title, Wolfe wrote, "People have searched for the fountain of youth for thousands of years. The thought was that if you bathed in or drank from the fountain of youth you would be transformed, rejuvenated. My fountain of youth is music, and in this case I offer the orchestra a sassy, rhythmic, high energy swim."

=== Instrumentation ===
The work is written for a large orchestra comprising three flutes (all doubling piccolo), three oboes, three clarinets, two bassoons, contrabassoon, four horns, three trumpets, three trombones (3rd doubling bass trombone), tuba, timpani, four percussionists, harp, piano, strings, and electric bass.

== Reception ==
Fountain of Youth has received praise from music critics. Joshua Kosman of the San Francisco Chronicle wrote, "Within just a few seconds of its opening, Fountain of Youth [...] washes over the audience with a sort of sonic tsunami. It's not oppressively loud, but it's got a dense, almost physical presence that grabs your attention and doesn't let go." He added, "It moves with the energy and impact of a juggernaut, but there's nothing tragic or somber about it. Instead, Wolfe seems to exult in her ability to maneuver big blocks of orchestral texture around the stage, like a titan playing with Legos." Richard Sylvester Oliver of the Texas Classical Review similarly praised the orchestration of the piece, writing, "This inventive use of metal and wood lifted the percussive element of the score above the dark ominous backdrop provided by the orchestra, resulting in a soundscape that was both playful and intimidating."
