= Michael Gordon (composer) =

American composer (born 1956)

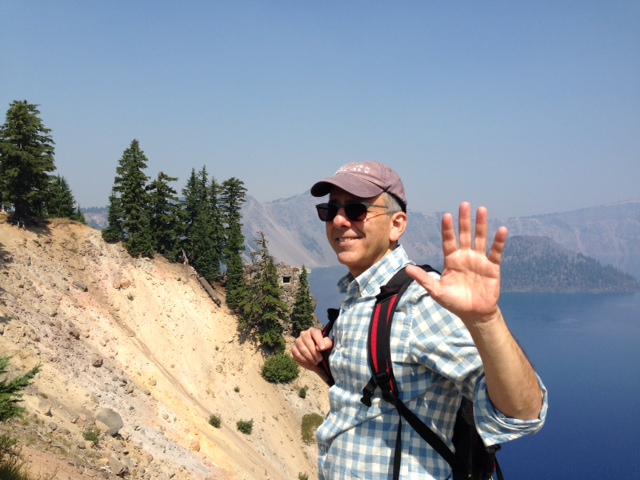
- Michael Gordon at Crater Lake
- Born: July 20, 1956 (age 70); Miami Beach, Florida, U.S.
- Education: New York University; Yale University
- Occupations: Composer, Professor of Music
- Spouse: Julia Wolfe (m. 1984)
- Children: 2
- Website: michaelgordonmusic.com

Michael Gordon (born July 20, 1956) is an American composer and co-founder of the Bang on a Can music collective and festival. He grew up in Nicaragua.

== Life and career ==
Michael Gordon was born in Miami Beach, Florida on July 20, 1956. He grew up in Nicaragua on the outskirts of Managua in an Eastern European Jewish community before moving back to Miami Beach at age eight.

Gordon's music is an outgrowth of his experience with underground rock bands in New York City and his formal training in composition at Yale where he studied with Martin Bresnick. He is based in New York City.

== Bang on a Can ==
Gordon is one of the founders and artistic directors of New York's Bang on a Can Festival, alongside fellow composers Julia Wolfe—his wife—and David Lang. He has collaborated with them on several projects.

The opera The Carbon Copy Building, a collaboration with comic book artist Ben Katchor, received the 2000 Village Voice Obie Award for Best New American Work. A projected comic strip accompanies and interacts with the singers, and the frames fall away in the telling of the story.

Gordon, Wolfe and Lang subsequently collaborated with librettist Deborah Artman on the 'oratorio' Lost Objects, the recording of which was released in summer 2001 (Teldec New Line).

A further project is Shelter, a multi-media work that was commissioned by the ensemble musikFabrik and features the Scandinavian vocalists Trio Mediaeval in a staged spectacle that, in the words of librettist Deborah Artman, "evokes the power and threat of nature, the soaring frontier promise contained in the framing of a new house, the pure aesthetic beauty of blueprints, the sweet architecture of sound and the uneasy vulnerability that underlies even the safety of our sleep." Shelter was premiered in Cologne in Germany in spring 2005, and received its US premiere in November 2005.

Both Shelter and Carbon Copy Building were staged by New York's Ridge Theater, in collaboration with Laurie Olinder (visual graphics), Bill Morrison (filmmaker) and Bob McGrath (director), with whom Gordon has often worked. The opera Chaos, with libretto by Matthew Maguire, premiered at The Kitchen in New York in the autumn of 1998 with stage direction by Bob McGrath. The work, which opened to rave reviews and packed houses, is a fast-paced science fiction spectacle in 25 short scenes.

In 2017, Chinese singer Gong Linna premiered Cloud River Mountain, written by the three Bang on a Can composers in addition to Lao Luo. They also premiered Road Trip, a celebration of Bang on a Can's 30-year journey, together at the Brooklyn Academy of Music in October 2017.

== Music ==
Gordon's music incorporates elements of dissonance, minimalism, modality, and popular culture.

His music has been presented at Lincoln Center for the Performing Arts, Carnegie Hall, The Proms, the Brooklyn Academy of Music, the Sydney 2000 Olympic Arts Festival, the Kennedy Center, The Kitchen, the Kölner Philharmonie, Royal Albert Hall, the Bonn Oper, and the Jewish Museum Vienna, as well as at the Rotterdam, Edinburgh, St. Petersburg, Holland, Adelaide, Huddersfield, Settembre Musica and Dresden music festivals. In addition, his music has been choreographed by Eliot Feld, The Royal Ballet, Emio Greco | PC, Wayne McGregor (for Stuttgart Ballet, Random Dance), Pina Bausch's Tanztheater Wuppertal, Heinz Spoerli (for Zürich Ballet), Ashley Page (for The Royal Ballet and the Scottish Ballet), and Club Guy & Roni. In 2017, Douglas Lee choreographed a Gordon score for the Ballett Zürich, and in 2018 Brian Brooks choreographed another score for the Miami City Ballet. Gordon is also a featured artist in the repertoires of Ensemble Modern, Alarm Will Sound, and the Kronos Quartet.

=== Notable works ===
Since 1991, Gordon has worked extensively with video. His work Van Gogh Video Opera, a collaboration with video artist Elliott Caplan, premiered to critical acclaim in New York in 1991 and received its European premiere in Vienna in 1992. Other works with Caplan include Grand Dairy, based on a diner on New York's Lower East Side, which was produced in Vienna in 1996, and Weather (German Tour 1997), in which the 16 string players of Ensemble Resonanz perform on a vertical stage surrounded by video panels. The recording of Weather is available on Arthrob/Nonesuch Records. In 1997 he worked with playwright Anna Deavere Smith on House Arrest, First Edition, which premiered at the Arena Stage Theater in Washington, DC.

Gordon's percussion sextet Timber was written for the percussion ensembles Slagwerk Den Haag and Mantra Percussion. This work, an evening-length piece for six 2x4 boards (standard North American softwood dimensional lumber used for buildings, with profile of nominally 2 × 4 inches, but of 1.5 x 3.5 inches in modern practice), toured with dance throughout 2009–10 and was premiered in its concert version in June 2011. The full percussion sextet was released on Cantaloupe Music in 2011. In 2014–15 it was played in Walt Disney Concert Hall (performed by So Percussion and members of the Los Angeles Philharmonic), in Belgium (by Ictus), and in Scandinavia (by Nordic Seks). Other recent pieces for single-instrument ensembles include Rushes for seven bassoons and Amplified for four electric guitars.

Decasia, a large-scale symphony with projections commissioned by the Europäischer Musikmonat 2001 for the Basel Sinfonietta, was also staged by the Ridge Theater. The orchestra sits on a triangular pyramid structure that surrounds the audience, while Bill Morrison's film of black and white 'found' footage in various states of deterioration is projected onto scrim draping the structure. The ensuing Bill Morrison film, Decasia, cut to Michael Gordon's complete score, was shown at the 2002 Sundance Film Festival and has been screened at film festivals worldwide.

Other large-scale symphonic works include Rewriting Beethoven's Seventh Symphony, a revised composition of Beethoven’s original symphony, commissioned by the 2006 Beethoven Festival in Bonn and premiered by Jonathan Nott and the Bamberg Symphony, and Sunshine of your Love, written for over 100 instruments divided into four microtonally tuned groups. Under the baton of composer/conductor John Adams, the Ensemble Modern toured Sunshine of your Love to seven European capitals in 1999.

In 2008, Gordon collaborated with Ridge Theater again on the multi-performer song-cycle Lightning at our Feet, co-commissioned by Cynthia Woods Mitchell Center for the Arts at the University of Houston and the Brooklyn Academy of Music for the Next Wave Festival. Lightning at our Feet puts Emily Dickinson's poetry to music and encompasses her words in a world of visual imagery. A further collaboration with Ridge Theater, Gotham, a commission from the American Composers Orchestra, incorporates film, projections, lighting and an orchestra of 35 musicians to explore the 'other' New York City. Directed by Bob McGrath, the work premiered at Carnegie's Zankel Hall in February 2004 with the American Composers Orchestra and combines Bill Morrison's archival and original footage of New York with Laurie Olinder's photographic projections of the urban landscape. Gordon and Morrison's works together also include Dystopia about Los Angeles, written in 2008 for David Robertson and the Los Angeles Philharmonic, and El Sol Caliente about Miami Beach, commissioned by the New World Symphony for the 100th anniversary of the city. The two also collaborated on a piano concerto for Tomoko Mukayaima and the Seattle Symphony in 2016 called The Unchanging Sea.

Gordon has worked extensively with London's Icebreaker. His work Yo Shakespeare was recorded by Icebreaker on their debut Argo/Decca recording Terminal Velocity, recently re-released by Cantaloupe Music. Gordon's work Trance was written for Icebreaker with the additional component of eight brass players. The 52-minute work was also originally recorded for Argo and was released in the autumn of 1996; a new re-mixed version is now on Cantaloupe Music. Link was written for the group in 1998, in collaboration with David Lang, as a complementary piece to Yo Shakespeare and Lang's Cheating, Lying, Stealing for a new ballet by Ashley Page for The Royal Ballet in London, subsequently revived by Page at the Scottish Ballet.

In 2004 Gordon released Light Is Calling (Nonesuch), an album of tracks created with producers R. Luke DuBois and Damian LeGassick, and scored for a small ensemble of musicians (most notably Todd Reynolds on violin) with complex electronic arrangements orchestrated by DuBois and LeGassick. He has since collaborated with DuBois extensively on the electronic backing arrangements for subsequent pieces, including All Vows for cellist Maya Beiser (2006, for which DuBois also served as a video artist), Sad Park for the Kronos Quartet (2006), and the opera What to Wear, libretto by Richard Foreman (2006). The Sad Park uses the voices of child witnesses to September 11 as its subject.

Gordon’s Natural History, inspired by Crater Lake National Park in Oregon and commissioned by the Britt Festival, was performed in July 2016 on the rim of the lake itself, as part of the 100th anniversary of America’s National Park Service. The premiere was performed by forty members of the Britt Orchestra, a chorus of fifty regional choristers, fifteen members of Steiger Butte Drum, whose members are all from the local Klamath Tribes, and thirty brass and percussionists from Southern Oregon University.

Gordon had three world premieres in the spring of 2016: The Unchanging Sea, a piano concerto for Tomoko Mukayaima and the Seattle Symphony, with video by Bill Morrison; Material, for four-person percussion and piano ensemble Yarn/Wire, playing one piano; and Observations on Air, a bassoon concerto for Peter Whelan and the Orchestra of the Age of Enlightenment. In 2017 The Crossing premiered Anonymous Man, a choral memoir, based on conversations that Gordon has had with a homeless man living on his street. Big Space, which premiered at the 2017 BBC Proms, distributes the musicians throughout the audience.

== Awards and recognition ==
The recipient of multiple awards and grants, Gordon has been honored by the Guggenheim Foundation, the National Endowment for the Arts, a 2002 Foundation for Contemporary Arts Grants to Artists Award, and the American Academy of Arts and Letters. Formed in 1983 as the "Michael Gordon Philharmonic" and renamed the "Michael Gordon Band" in 2000, Gordon's own ensemble has performed across Europe and the United States at venues such as Alice Tully Hall and the punk mecca CBGB, on the Contemporary Music Network Tour, and at the Almeida Festival in London. In September 2016 Gordon was named the first-ever composer-in-residence of the Young People's Chorus of New York City.

== List of works ==
- Thou Shalt!/Thou Shalt Not! (1983) clarinets, percussion, keyboard, electric guitar, violin and viola (18')
- The Low Quartet (1985) for any four low instruments (8')
- Strange Quiet (1985) for clarinets, percussion, keyboard, electric guitar, violin and viola (14')
- Acid Rain (1986) for flute, clarinet, organ and string quintet (8')
- Four Kings Fight Five (1988) for oboe, clarinet, percussion, electric guitar, violin, viola, and cello
- Paint It Black (1988) for solo double bass (11')
- Van Gogh Video Opera (1991) (1h 5') live opera with video
- Romeo (1992) for chamber orchestra (8')
- Yo Shakespeare (1992) for large ensemble (Icebreaker) (11')
- Industry (1992) for solo cello and electronics
- XVI (1993) for chorus of sixteen singers (15')
- Chaos (1994) opera (1h 20')
- Trance (1995) for large ensemble (Icebreaker) (50')
- acdc (1996) for flute, clarinet, violin, cello and piano (10')
- I Buried Paul (1996) for clarinet, percussion, keyboard, electric guitar, cello, double bass (Bang on a Can All-Stars)
- Love Bead (1997) for large ensemble (Ensemble Modern) (10')
- Weather (1997) for 16-piece string orchestra and video
- Weather One (1997) for string sextet (20')
- XY (1998) for solo percussion
- vera, chuck, and dave (1998) for large ensemble
- Music for Airports (1998) (with David Lang and Julia Wolfe) arrangement for small ensemble (48')
- Link (1998) (with David Lang) for large ensemble (Icebreaker) (11')
- Sunshine of Your Love (1999) for large orchestra (10')
- The Carbon Copy Building (with David Lang and Julia Wolfe) (1999) opera with video
- Lost Objects (with David Lang and Julia Wolfe; libretto by Deborah Artman) (2000) oratorio with video
- Decasia (2001) for orchestra with film (1h 7')
- Potassium (2001) for string quartet (15')
- Tinge (2004) for three violins and audio playback (4')
- Gotham (2004) for chamber orchestra (30')
- Who By Water (2004) for large ensemble (Alarm Will Sound) (18')
- Light is Calling (2004) studio album, version for band also
- Sonatra (2004) for solo piano (25')
- Idle (2004) for three violins and audio playback (5')
- Grey Pink Yellow (2005) for orchestra (12')
- What to Wear (2005) (with text by Richard Foreman) opera (65')
- Acquanetta (libretto by Deborah Artman) (2005/2017) opera (1h 10')
- Shelter (with David Lang and Julia Wolfe; libretto by Deborah Artman) (2005) oratorio with video
- The Sad Park (2006) for string quartet and pre-recorded voice (25')
- All Vows (2006, rev. 2014) for solo cello (15')
- Rewriting Beethoven's Seventh Symphony (2006) for orchestra (22')
- Dystopia (2007) for orchestra (29')
- Every Stop On The F Train (2007) for treble voices (5')
- the light of the dark (2008) for small ensemble (13')
- (purgatorio) POPERA (2008) for six electric guitars (20')
- Water (2008) (with David Lang and Julia Wolfe) for chorus and ensemble (76')
- Lightning at our feet (2008) opera for four singer/performers playing violin, cello, piano, electric guitar, and electronics (75')
- Timber (2009) for six percussionists (60')
- for Madeline (2009) for small ensemble (8')
- He Saw a Skull (2009) for twelve voices (6')
- Clouded Yellow (2010) for string quartet (10')
- Exalted (2010) for chorus and string quartet (10')
- Tree-oh (2011) for three violins (6')
- Cold (2011) for large ensemble (15')
- Gene Takes a Drink (2012) for small ensemble (6')
- Rushes (2012) for seven bassoons (56')
- Dry (2013) for large ensemble (18')
- Beijing Harmony (2013) for orchestra (12')
- Aftermath (2014) dance piece (23')
- Ode to La Bruja, Hanon, Czerny, Van Cliburn and little gold stars... (or, To Everyone Who Made My Life Miserable, Thank You.) (2014) for six pianos (17')
- Hyper (2014) for small ensemble (12')
- El Sol Caliente (2015) for orchestra (20')
- No anthem (2015) for large ensemble (10')
- Cloud-River-Mountain (2015) for chamber ensemble (20')
- Amplified (2015) for four electric guitars (60')
- Great Trees of New York City (2016) for SATB
- Observations on Air (2016) for bassoon and orchestra (20')
- The Unchanging Sea (2016) for orchestra (20')
- Material (2016) for two pianists and two percussionists on one piano (25')
- kwerk (2016) for violin (4')
- Natural History (2016) for orchestra, chorus, brass, and drums (20')
- CORPUS (2017) for orchestra (30')
- Big Space (2017) for orchestra (25')
- Road Trip (2017) for small ensemble (60')
- On Desbrosses Street (2017) for piano (10')
- New work for Miami City Ballet (2018) for orchestra (20')

== Recordings ==
- Big Noise from Nicaragua (1994)
- Weather (1999)
- Decasia (2002)
- Light is Calling (2004)
- Trance (2004)
- Van Gogh (2008)
- (purgatorio) POPOPERA (2008)
- Timber (2011)
- Rushes (2014)
- Dystopia (2015)
- Gotham (2015)
- Sonatra (2018)
- Clouded Yellow (2018)
- Field of Vision (2026)
