= Tristan Perich =

Composer and sound artist

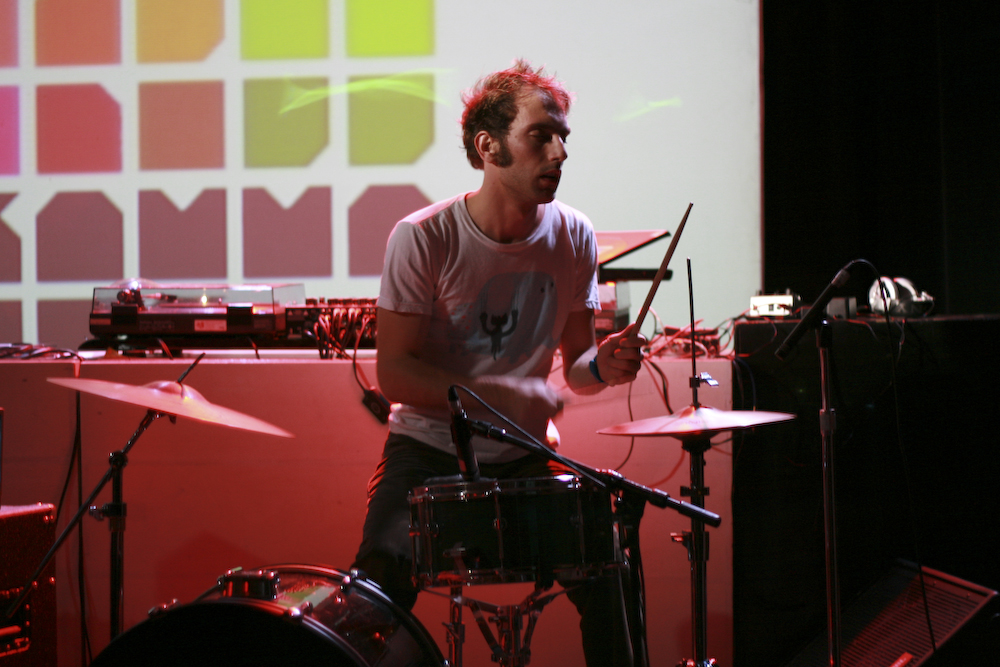
Tristan Perich (2007)

Tristan Perich (born 1982) is a contemporary composer and sound artist from New York City who focuses on electronic one-bit sound.

Perich received his B.A. from Columbia University in 2004 and went on to earn a master's degree from New York University Tisch School of the Arts. Perich is of Croatian descent.

Perich composed a series of compositions as well as sound art installations with one-bit electronics, which Perich describes as being music that never has more than one bit of information being played at any given time. In Denmark he was an artist in residence, where he built a series of sculptures called Interval Studies consisting of large numbers of small speakers, each sending out its own frequency. The blending of all of these independent frequencies generates white noise, or other forms of colored noise. His other works include Machine Drawings and 1-bit Video.

Together with Kunal Gupta and Katie Shima he forms the group Loud Objects. This group performs electronic music by soldering.

Perich has performed on Blip Festival and SxSW. Works by Perich have been commissioned for Bang on a Can festival held at Lincoln Center in New York City.

In February 2010 he won, with his Loud Objects collective, third prize in the Guthman Instrument Competition at Georgia Tech with a circuit bent electronic system.

Works of Perich have been performed by the Bang on a Can ensemble, the Calder Quartet and Meehan/Perkins. His work has been reviewed by The Wire. He received the Prix Ars Electronica in 2009 and was a featured artist at Sónar 2010 in Barcelona. In 2023, The Wire featured Perich in a profile exploring his evolving use of microchips and custom hardware in sound installations, framing his work as a meditation on "the limits of computation and the beauty of constraint."

Perich was the Edward E. Elson Artist-in-Residence of the Addison Gallery of American Art at Phillips Academy in Andover, Massachusetts, serving as a composer, musician and visual artist.

In 2013, Perich was artist-in-residence at MIT's Center for Art, Science & Technology (CAST), presenting public performances and lectures.

His work is included in "Soundings: A Contemporary Score", which was at the Museum of Modern Art, New York City from August 10 until November 3, 2013.

== Discography ==
- 1-bit music, Cantaloupe Music, 2005, CD box with built-in electronics
- 1-bit symphony, Cantaloupe Music, 2010, CD box with built-in electronics
- Surface Image for solo piano and 40-channel, 1-bit electronics (New Amsterdam Records NWAM060, 2014)
- Drift Multiply for 50 violins and 50-channel 1-bit electronics (Nonesuch/Elektra Records 79181, 2020)
- Infinity Gradient with James McVinnie, for organ and 100-channel 1-bit electronics (Erased Tapes, 2025)
