= Viewpoints =

Acting technique

Viewpoints is an acting technique that requires a framework for creating and analyzing performance by exploring spatial relationships, shape, time, emotion, movement mechanics and the materiality of the performer's body. Rooted in the domains of postmodern theatre and dance composition, the Viewpoints operate as a medium for thinking about and acting upon movement, gesture and the creative use of space.

== Background ==
The Six Viewpoints was originally developed in the 1970s by master theater artist and educator Mary Overlie, later conceptualised in her book Standing in Space: The Six Viewpoints Theory & Practice (2016). Overlie's Viewpoints and practice are seen to contribute greatly to the postmodern movement in theatre, dance, and choreography, grounded in its opposition against modernism's emphasis on hierarchical structure in performance creation, fixed meaning, and linear narratives.

A key principle of the Viewpoints practice is horizontalism, a distinct focus on a non-hierarchical organisation of the performance elements, meaning shared engagement with elements like space, body, text, time, shape, and emotion. The practice subsequently constitutes a shared agency of creation amongst performers and creators in working through the individual body and its surrounding material environment as part of a collective ensemble. The Viewpoints thus encourages the performer to incorporate their own bodily impulses and personal experiences in the act of creation.

The Six Viewpoints theory was adapted by directors Anne Bogart and Tina Landau, ultimately resulting in the delineation of nine "physical" and five "vocal" Viewpoints. Bogart and Overlie were on the faculty of the Experimental Theatre Wing at NYU Tisch School of the Arts in the late 1970s and early 1980s, during which Bogart was influenced by Overlie's innovations. Overlie's Six Viewpoints are considered to be a methodology to examine, analyze, and create performance in non-hierarchised and deconstructed way, whilst Bogart's Viewpoints are considered practical in creating staging with actors.

== Overlie's Viewpoints ==
=== Introduction and overview ===
The Six Viewpoints is a philosophical and practical approach to articulate a post-modern perspective on performance. The practice involves deconstructing the physical stage and physical performance into its six Materials of composition: Space, Shape, Time, Emotion, Movement and Story. These six elements have existed historically within a rigid hierarchy which gives prevalence to story and emotion in theatre, and shape and movement in dance. The Six Viewpoints releases the Materials from this fixed construct into a fluid non-hierarchical environment for re-examination. The act of deconstructing performance into its Six Materials invites the performer, director, and artist to engage with the individual materials "allowing these elements to take the lead in a creative dialogue".

For Overlie, this shift in attention re-defines art and the role of the artist from a "creator/originator" mindset to what she called the "observer/participant," which centers on "witnessing, and interacting, ... working under the supposition that structure could be discerned rather than imposed". Overlie observed this redefinition of the artist's endeavor to correspond with the artistic shift from modernism to post-modernism.

The theory and practice of the Six Viewpoints are organized in two parts: The Materials and The Bridge.

=== The materials (SSTEMS) ===
When working with the materials, the artist is instructed to turn off the impulse to control or own the material, and is challenged to work very specifically with each material as an independent entity. Overlie recommends the artist to gather as much "useless" data as they can and to take time to explore.

The seed of the entire work of The Six Viewpoints is found in the simple act of standing in space. From this perspective the artist is invited to read and be educated by the lexicon of daily experience. The information of space, the experience of time, the familiarity of shapes, the qualities and rules of kinetics in movement, the ways of logic, how stories are formed, the states of being and emotional exchanges that constitute the process of communication between living creatures ... Working directly with these materials the artist begins to learn of performance through the essential languages as an independent intelligence (Overlie).

The Six Materials of composition, referred to with the acronym SSTEMS, are:

S (Space)
Space contains blocking, placement of furniture, placement of the walls, doors and windows, angle of gaze, distance of projection, and spatial alignment of the actors to the proscenium, to the audience and to each other.
S (Shape)
Shape contains geometry, costumes, gestures, and the shape of the actors' bodies and of all the objects onstage.
T (Time)
Time contains duration, rhythm, punctuation, pattern, impulse, repetition, legato, pizzicato, lyrical.
E (Emotion)
Emotion contains presence, anger, laughter, pensiveness, empathy, alienation, romance, pity, fear, anticipation, etc.
M (Movement)
Movement contains falling, walking, running, breath, suspension, contraction, impact.
S (Story)
Story contains logic, order and progression of information, memory, projection, conclusion, allusions, truth, lies, associations, influences, power, weakness, reification, un-reification, constructions and deconstruction.

=== The Bridge ===
The Bridge is a sequence of nine laboratories that function as philosophical and pedagogical frameworks in which to engage with the Materials. The Bridge presents the origins of the Viewpoints' approach to art and introduces into practice the philosophical concepts that are used to disintegrate and then reintegrate performance.

The nine laboratories of The Bridge are:

- News of a Difference: Noticing Difference in Increasing Levels of Subtlety
- Deconstruction: Investigating Theater by Separating the Components of its Structure
- The Horizontal: Non-hierarchical Composition
- Post-modernism: The Philosophical Foundation
- Reification: A Reflection on Creativity, Communication, and Language
- The Piano: The Interface between Artist and Audience
- The Matrix: The Ingredients are in the Cauldron
- Doing the Unnecessary: The SSTEMS Dissolve
- The Original Anarchist: A New and a Very Old Idea

As a practice at large, The Six Viewpoints "is dedicated to reading the stage as a force of Nature".

== Bogart's and Landau's Viewpoints ==
In their book, The Viewpoints Book: A Practical Guide to Viewpoints and Composition (2005), Anne Bogart and Tina Landau identify the primary Viewpoints as those relating to Time - which are Tempo, Duration, Kinesthetic Response, and Repetition - and those relating to Space - which are Shape, Gesture, Architecture, Spatial Relationship and Topography. In addition, Bogart and Landau have added the Vocal Viewpoints which include Pitch, Volume, and Timbre.

In the book, the authors outline the basics of the Viewpoints training they both espouse, as well as specific methods for applying their expanded practice to both rehearsals and production. For Bogart and Landau, the Viewpoints represent not only a physical technique but also a philosophical, spiritual, and aesthetic approach to many aspects of their work. Bogart references her work with the SITI company, and Landau with the Steppenwolf Theater Company.

Bogart's Viewpoints, a re-conceptualisation of Overlie's Viewpoints, are:

- Architecture: The physical environment, the space, and whatever belongs to it or constitutes it, including permanent and non-permanent features.
- Spatial Relationship: Distance between objects on stage; one body in relation to another, to a group, or to the architecture.
- Topography: The movement over landscape, floor pattern, design and colours.
- Shape: The contour or outline of bodies in space; the shape of the body by itself, in relation to other bodies, or in relation to architecture; lines, curves, angles, arches all stationary or in motion.
- Gesture: a) Behavioral gesture: realistic gesture belonging to the physical world as we observe it every day. b) Expressive gesture: abstract or symbolic gesture expressing an inner state or emotion; it is not intended as a public or "realistic" gesture.
- Tempo: How quickly or slowly something happens on stage.
- Duration: How long an event occurs over time; how long a person or a group maintains a particular movement, tempo, gesture, etc. before it changes.
- Kinesthetic Response: A spontaneous reaction to a motion that occurs outside of oneself. An instinctive response to an external stimulus (realistic/non-realistic).
- Repetition: a) Internal Repetition: repeating a movement done with one's own body, and b) External Repetition: repeating a movement occurring outside one's body.

== Lineage and influence on Viewpoints ==
It is possible to trace several historical influences on Mary Overlie's Six Viewpoints, and subsequently on Anne Bogart's and Tina Landau's Viewpoints. There is a family resemblance between the non-hierarchical nature of the nine Viewpoints and the spiral or scaffolded nature of the Dalcroze Subjects in Dalcroze Eurhythmics. This practice was disseminated in New York City's dance and theatre scenes by Elsa Findlay in the early- to mid-twentieth century. Elsa Findlay was a graduate of Emile Jaques-Dalcroze's Hellerau Institute in Germany prior to the First World War. Martha Graham studied with Findlay, and Overlie acknowledges the impact of her own studies with Graham. Overlie also studied with José Limón who was a student of Doris Humphrey. Humphrey was another pupil of Elsa Findlay who made significant contributions to dance-theatre and established Plastique Animee in the USA. Additionally, Suzanne Bing's Musique Corporelle contains a series of nine musical elements for actor training that bear a strong family resemblance to the nine Viewpoints.
