= Cantaloupe Music =

Record label

- Founded: 2001
- Founder: Michael Gordon, David Lang, Julia Wolfe, Kenny Savelson
- Distributor: Naxos
- Genre: Contemporary classical, avant-garde, experimental
- Country of origin: United States
- Location: Brooklyn, New York
- Official website: cantaloupemusic.com

Cantaloupe Music is a Brooklyn-based record label that produces and releases contemporary classical music and other forms of avant-garde music. The label was founded in 2001 by Michael Gordon, David Lang, Julia Wolfe, and Kenny Savelson. Gordon, Lang, and Wolfe are composers who founded the Bang on a Can music festival in New York City, while Savelson has worked as the festival's music director. Cantaloupe Music is distributed by Naxos in North America and worldwide by Naxos Global Logistics.

== History ==
Cantaloupe Music was launched in March 2001 with the release of the Bang on a Can All Stars recording Renegade Heaven. "It's no secret that over the last five years or so, the record industry has been constantly going through shifts," Gordon told Billboard at the time. "Companies are being bought and sold, and it seems to us that there's more emphasis on profitability and very big records. We're trying to build Cantaloupe on a different kind of model — more like a small press that has a long-term relationship with a small number of artists."

== Partial roster ==
- Alarm Will Sound
- Alex Weiser
- Annie Gosfield
- Arnold Dreyblatt
- Asphalt Orchestra
- Bang on a Can
- Bobby Previte
- Brian Eno
- Burkina Electric
- Dan Trueman
- David Lang
- Dominic Frasca
- Don Byron
- ETHEL
- Evan Ziporyn
- Glenn Kotche
- gutbucket
- Icebreaker
- Iva Bittová
- John Cage
- John Luther Adams
- Julia Wolfe
- Ken Thomson
- Kronos Quartet
- Laurie Anderson
- Lisa Moore
- Maya Beiser
- Michael Gordon
- Michael Harrison
- Paquito D'Rivera
- Pedro Giraudo
- Phil Kline
- Philip Glass
- So Percussion
- Steve Reich
- Terry Riley
- Tristan Perich

== See also ==
- List of record labels
