= Eve Beglarian =

American composer and musician

Eve Beglarian (born Ann Arbor, Michigan, U.S., July 22, 1958) is a contemporary American composer, performer and audio producer of Armenian descent. Her music is often characterized as postminimalist.

Her chamber, choral, and orchestral music has been commissioned and widely performed by The Los Angeles Master Chorale, the Bang on a Can All-Stars, The Chamber Music Society of Lincoln Center, The California EAR Unit, The Orchestra of St. Luke's, Relâche, The Paul Dresher Ensemble, Sequitur, and The American Composers Orchestra, among many others. She received a Foundation for Contemporary Arts Robert Rauschenberg Award (2015).

== Discography ==
=== Albums ===
- Overstepping (1998)
- Tell the Birds (2006)

=== Collaborations ===
- Dream Cum Go Down - Eve Beglarian and Juliana Luecking (1995)
- Dancing in Place - Elizabeth Panzer (1999)
- Play Nice - Twisted Tutu (1999)
- Almost Human (Beiser) - Maya Beiser (2007)

=== Compilations ===
- Lesbian American Composers (1998)
- Emergency Music (1998)
- Messiah Remix (2004)
- To Have and to Hold (2007)
- 60x60 (2004-2005) (2007)
- Ceci n'est pas une guitare (Stradivarius, 2007)
- Electric Creatures (Sussidiaria, 2018)
