= My Beautiful Scream =

Concerto for amplified string quartet and orchestra

My Beautiful Scream is a concerto for amplified string quartet and orchestra by the American composer Julia Wolfe. The work was jointly commissioned by Radio France, the Basel Sinfonietta, and the Brooklyn Philharmonic for the Kronos Quartet. It was first performed on February 6, 2004 at the Festival Presence in Paris by the Orchestre Philharmonique de Radio France and the Kronos Quartet.

== Composition ==
My Beautiful Scream is composed in one continuous movement and has a duration of roughly 25 minutes.

=== Inspiration ===
Wolfe composed the piece shortly after the September 11 attacks near Wolfe's home in Manhattan. She commented on the effects of this experience in the score program note, writing:

At night I would have this strange sensation that I was going to die. In general my life was very beautiful – my kids were at ages that were particularly magical. So it was this strange existence of living in beauty and having the sensation of a long drawn out internal scream.

Wolfe added:

The piece for the Kronos Quartet and orchestra is in a way a nonconcerto for string quartet. The quartet begins quiet, personal, and fine. The orchestra is more violent, menacing, and strident. But the quartet, which is amplified, gradually emerges to ride above the orchestra in a loud and emotional frenzy. The overall arch is a scream, in slow motion, beginning with the breath that one takes and reaching out to the extremity of the human cry. I have never taken the arch of a scream as a "form" before. Screams may be present in my music, but they happen suddenly without warning, frenetic and hyper. My Beautiful Scream demanded a more gradual unfolding – the unraveling of my own slow motion scream.

=== Instrumentation ===
The work is scored for an amplified string quartet and an orchestra comprising two flutes, piccolo, two oboes, cor anglais, two clarinets, bass clarinet, two bassoons, contrabassoon, four horns, three trumpets, two trombones, bass trombone, tuba, four percussionists, harp, piano, electric bass guitar, and strings.

== Reception ==
Allan Kozinn of The New York Times praised the composition, writing, "Ms. Wolfe composed My Beautiful Scream as a response to the Sept. 11 attacks, but instead of writing a memorial work or a brooding philosophical piece, she went with pure gut instinct: her piece is an intensely stylized, intricately detailed, elongated slow- motion scream." He added, "The Kronos and the Brooklyn players rendered the 25-minute work with a patient intensity that brought out its searing, elemental pain, yet kept that pain at a distance, rendering it observable and affecting rather than oppressive." Janos Gereben of the San Francisco Classical Voice was also impressed by the piece, writing:

The "Rheingold"-like slow, deep, suspenseful pedal-point opening made the audience sit up and pay attention. The quiet, "atmospheric" background is then interrupted by startling unison exclamations, but the actual scream is a long way off. In the interim, there are some massive insect sounds alternating with hushed passages, only brief use of ostinato reminiscent of Philip Glass (Kronos violinists David Harrington and, especially, John Sherba working their hearts out), and a fine balance, favoring the discreetly amplified quartet.

Michael Upchurch of The Seattle Times called it "extraordinary" and "elemental in its violence, yet masterfully structured." Upchurch further remarked, "Scream pits a lightly amplified string quartet against a full orchestra. A gradually intensifying veil of string sound is violated by brutal orchestral intrusions. Doppler-effect distortions in the brass add to the mounting chaos. When the whole edifice collapses, the frenzied quartet finds itself flailing against seething and surging batteries of percussion."
