= Brian Swibel =

American writer & producer

- Born: Evanston, Illinois, U.S.
- Education: The Goodman School of Drama (BFA); Saratoga International Theater Institute
- Awards: Tony Award for Best Musical; Tony Award for Special Theatrical Event; Outer Critics Circle Award; Kodak Emerging Filmmaker

Brian Swibel, often credited as B. Swibel, is an American writer, producer, director and activist. Working in theater, film, and television, he has garnered five Tony Award nominations, an Outer Critics Circle Award, and a Kodak Emerging Filmmaker honor at the Cannes Film Festival.

His written work includes the short films: Fault, which premiered at the Cannes Film Festival and received worldwide distribution from Shorts International; Sunset Town, which premiered at Lake Placid Film Festival and screened around the world; and Forbidden Fruit, which he created for Stevie Wonder and NBC, based on the non-fiction book by Pulitzer finalist, Betty DeRamus.

Swibel's Broadway theatrical productions include Moulin Rouge! The Musical, An American in Paris, Oh, Hello on Broadway, You’re Welcome America: A Final Night with George W. Bush, Beetlejuice, The New One, King Kong, The Performers, The Seagull, Amelie, and Xanadu.

His Off-Broadway productions include My Daughter Keeps Our Hammer, a New York Times and Time Out NY Critics Pick, and Family Secrets, directed by Bob Balaban. His regional, national tour, and worldwide productions include Xanadu, The New One, Dangerous Beauty, Amelie, An American in Paris, and Moulin Rouge! The Musical.

For TV, Swibel's productions of Oh, Hello on Broadway premiered on Netflix, You’re Welcome America: A Final Night with George W. Bush, on HBO, An American in Paris, on PBS, and The New One, on Netflix. He most recently produced the Woody Harrelson-narrated Netflix documentary, Kiss The Ground, which premiered in 2020.

Swibel has created, directed, and produced multiple hit web series, including Cubby Bernstein, written by Douglas Carter Beane and starring Cynthia Nixon, Nathan Lane and Patti Lupone, and The Trumpty Dumpty Cycle, written by John Lithgow and starring Meryl Streep, Samuel L. Jackson and Joseph Gordon Levitt, among many others.

== Background ==
Swibel grew up outside Chicago, studying at The Piven Theater Workshop, before moving to a remote mountaintop in Running Springs, California at 15. While in California, he wrote his first play, Children of the Moon, based on Henrik Ibsen's Ghosts. He returned to Chicago where he apprenticed under Robert Falls and the artistic department at The Goodman Theater. He went on to graduate from The Goodman School of Drama. While attending The Goodman, Swibel was approached by actress Maggie Fine to direct Sam Shepard's Cowboy Mouth. The production, starring Fine and actor Steve Haggard, led Swibel to establish the production company that would one day become Triptyk Studios.

During this period he wrote original plays at Bogart's Saratoga International Theater Institute, assistant directed Lisa Portes’ production of Polaroid Stories starring McCraney, and Henry Godinez’s production of Julius Caesar, both at The Merle Reskin Theater, and produced and directed numerous productions for his own company, including Daniel McIvor's House, starring Bradley Grant Smith.

== Screenwriting ==
Upon graduating from The Goodman, Swibel wrote and produced his first short film, Sunset Town, with his brother and early creative partner, Justin David Swibel. The film, shot in Chicago, featured many actors from his company and starred Chicago stage actor, Larry Yando. Sunset Town premiered at the Lake Placid Film Festival as a "Spotlight Short" and screened internationally.

Swibel then wrote his second short film with his brother, Fault, which screened at over 60 festivals internationally, ultimately showing in Kodak's Emerging Filmmaker Showcase at Festival De Cannes. Fault was distributed by Shorts International.

In 2008, Swibel was set to produce the dramatic television series, Big Dead Place, based on the Antarctic-set memoir by Nicholas Johnson. James Gandolfini signed on to star in the series as his follow-up to The Sopranos, and the series was sold to HBO. Tim Van Patten signed on to direct. After Gandolfini died, the project was put into turnaround, then re-sold to independent studio, Entertainment One.

Swibel created the anthology series, Forbidden Fruit, referred to at times as Freedom Run, with collaborator, executive producer, and composer, Stevie Wonder, for NBC. Based on the non-fiction book by Betty DeRamus, the series tells true stories of love and revolution throughout the Civil Rights Movement.

== Theater ==
In 2006, Swibel directed a Los Angeles production of Good Thing by playwright Jessica Goldberg. The Encino Sun praised Swibel's "passionate direction". That same year, Swibel co-wrote a stage version of the novel To Die For with novelist Joyce Maynard. The work was featured in Hartford Stage's Brand: NEW Play Festival.

=== Off-Broadway ===
In 2006, Swibel produced his first Off-Broadway play, Family Secrets, directed by Bob Balaban, at 37 Arts. In 2014, Swibel returned to Off-Broadway to produce, My Daughter Keeps Her Hammer, by Brian Watkins, directed by Danya Taymor, at The Flea Theater.

=== Broadway and worldwide productions ===
In 2007, Swibel was a producer on Broadway show Xanadu, a musical satire by Douglas Carter Beane. The show earned four Tony-nominations, including Best Musical. The production of Xanadu was unusual for having no veteran Broadway producers on its team.

In 2008, Swibel's company co-produced the Broadway production of Anton Chekhov's The Seagull, starring Kristen Scott Thomas, Carey Mulligan, and Peter Sarsgaard.

Swibel next brought Will Ferrell and Adam McKay’s You’re Welcome, America: A Final Night with George W. Bush to Broadway. Directed by McKay and starring Will Ferrell, the production opened on the eve of Barack Obama's inauguration and became a smash hit. The production earned a Tony nomination for Best Special Theatrical Event and was filmed for broadcast on HBO.

Swibel's company co-produced the Broadway production of The Performers, starring Alicia Silverstone, Henry Winkler, and Ari Graynor. The production's run was cut short by superstorm Hurricane Sandy.

In 2014, Swibel mounted the Broadway musical An American in Paris under his company's new name, Triptyk Studios. Based on the film with music and lyrics by George and Ira Gershwin, an original book by Craig Lucas and direction by Christopher Wheeldon, An American in Paris tried out at the Theatre du Chatelet in Paris, before opening on Broadway in 2015. The production earned 12 Tony nominations, including Best Musical, and won four. The An American in Paris US tour launched in 2016, followed by the West End production in 2017.

In 2015, Swibel's Triptyk Studios launched the pre-Broadway run of Amelie, A New Musical at Berkeley Repertory Theater, with a book by Craig Lucas, music by Daniel Messe, lyrics by Nathan Tysen and Daniel Messe, and direction by Pam McKinnon. The Berkeley Rep production starred Samantha Barks and received critical acclaim, moving to Los Angeles in 2016, and Broadway in 2017. A UK tour followed in 2019 and a West End production was planned for 2021.

In 2017, Swibel's Triptyk Studios was back with Oh, Hello on Broadway, written by and starring Nick Kroll and John Mulaney, with direction by Alex Timbers. The sold-out run was a smash with critics and audiences and was subsequently filmed for Netflix, where it began streaming on June 13, 2017.

In 2018, Swibel's Triptyk Studios opened King Kong on Broadway with music by Marius de Vries, lyrics by Eddie Perfect, and book by Jack Thorne. Entertainment Weekly's review admired the artistry of the Kong puppet but called the human characters "rote" and said the songs were unmemorable. The show earned a Special Tony Award.

The same year, Swibel's Triptyk Studios opened the Broadway production of The New One, written by and starring Mike Birbiglia. After a successful run, a filmed version of the production launched globally on Netflix on November 26, 2019.

In 2019, Swibel's Triptyk Studio's opened the Broadway production of the new musical, Beetlejuice, based on the classic film, with music and lyrics by Eddie Perfect, book by Scott Brown and Anthony King, and direction by Alex Timbers. The show became a sensation through Tik-Tok and enjoyed a dedicated audience, garnering eight Tony nominations, including Best Musical.

That same year, Swibel's Triptyk Studio's produced Moulin Rouge! The Musical, based on Baz Luhrmann's film of the same name, with a book by John Logan, direction by Alex Timbers, choreography by Sonya Tayeh, and musical direction by Justin Levine. Moulin Rouge! The Musical consistently performed as the second most popular show on Broadway behind Hamilton and was subsequently nominated for 14 Tony Awards. The Broadway production was shut down due to the COVID-19 epidemic but plans to reopen. The Melbourne, Australia production opened in 2021. US National Tour, West End, and Tokyo productions are also in the works.

== Webseries ==
Swibel co-directed and produced the 8-episode comedy series Cubby Bernstein about a supernatural Tony Awards campaign adviser trapped in the body of a 10-year-old boy from Long Island.

In 2020, his studio created the hit web series, The Trumpty Dumpty Cycle, produced by John Lithgow and Tim Van Patten, and based on Lithgow's New York Times bestseller, Trumpty Dumpty Wanted a Crown. The 21-episode series premiered during the run-up to the 2020 presidential election and starred a multitude of stars, including Meryl Streep, Samuel L. Jackson, Joseph Gordon Levitt, Annette Bening, Glenn Close, Steve Buscemi, Edie Falco, and more. The series was featured on The Late Show with Stephen Colbert.

== Activism ==
Swibel is a member of the Cultural Counsel for the anti-corruption organization, RepresentUs. In 2020, he produced the star-studded virtual event, United to Save The Vote, featuring Jennifer Lopez, Dave Matthews, Alicia Keys, Sia, Ed Helms, Jennifer Lawrence, Zooey Deschanel, and more.

Swibel is a board member of Every Last One, an organization fighting to free separated migrant children from detention and advocate for immigrant families.

== Triptyk Studios ==
Swibel formed the first iteration of his production company, World Tribe Players, during his junior year at Chicago's Goodman School of Drama, to focus on experimental theater and independent film. In 2006, six years later and in advance of the Broadway production of Xanadu, he reformed the company as B. Swibel Presents. That same year, Swibel met Broadway producer Tara Smith and partnered with her in the newly formed company: an official affiliation between Smith's Playing Pretend Productions and B. Swibel Presents, sharing production offices, staff, and operations.

In 2008, Swibel and Smith began working with writer, composer, and producer Adam Westbrook, their third partner in what would become Triptyk Studios, and who gave the company its name.

In 2014, in advance of their production of An American in Paris, Swibel and Smith officially combined B. Swibel Presents and Playing Pretend Productions and, along with Westbrook, were billed as Triptyk Studios for the first time.

Triptyk developed and produced theater, film, television, web series, and social justice events, such as Moulin Rouge! The Musical, Kiss the Ground, The Trumpty Dumpty Cycle, and United to Save the Vote, respectively.
