= Cruel Sister (Wolfe) =

2004 composition of orchestra by Julia Wolfe

Julia Wolfe in 2012

Cruel Sister is a composition for string orchestra by the American composer Julia Wolfe. The work was commissioned by the German music club Musica Femina München. It was first performed by the Munich Chamber Orchestra conducted by Christoph Poppen in Munich on May 27, 2004. The music is composed in a single movement and has a duration of roughly 35 minutes.

== Composition ==
The music is based on the murder ballad of "The Twa Sisters," sometimes known as "The Cruel Sister." The narrative tells of two sisters courted by the same man. One sister is consumed by jealousy and pushes the other into the sea to her death. A group of minstrels later find her body on the shore and fashion a harp from her breastbone. Those same minstrels later play at the sororicidal sister's wedding and as the music reaches the bride's ears, the song concludes, "And surely now her tears will flow."

Wolfe was first introduced to the story in college when she heard a 1970 rendition of the ballad by the British band Pentangle. "While there are no musical references to the original tune," Wolfe later wrote, "the story of the ballad inspired a response." She added, "The ballad is incredibly haunting and powerful. I was fascinated and horrified by the overwhelming greed and jealousy of the tale. My Cruel Sister is a search to unravel this human dilemma. In a sense, it is the music of 'the harp,' a plea for a higher love."

== Reception ==
Cruel Sister has received a positive response from music critics. Andrew Clements of The Guardian called it "a striking half-hour showpiece for strings alone, which moves from menace to an uneasy calm, and then to a pizzicato-led coda." Anthony Tommasini of The New York Times further remarked:

Cruel Sister, steeped in the post-Minimalist style, begins with the lower strings laying down a hypnotic pattern of insistent eighth-notes. Other strings enter with sustained tones that build into elemental chords, pierced by eerie, high lines on the violins.

When the music erupts with frenzied chords, tremors and sirenlike screeching, you know that the sister's jealousy has turned murderous. An extended passage of calm harmonies hovering over a drone bass depicts the body of her victim floating on the water.

The harp music at the wedding is suggested at first by the violas playing staggered staccato notes. Soon the entire ensemble breaks into aggressive pizzicatos: a horrific din of plucking, the 'harp gone mad,' as Ms. Wolfe put it. The piece ends with just a hint of a sad song, as if coming from some far-off place.
