= Anthracite Fields =

2014 Oratorio by Julia Wolfe

Anthracite Fields is an oratorio for choir and chamber ensemble by the American composer Julia Wolfe.

The work was commissioned by the Mendelssohn Club with contributions from New Music USA and was premiered by Bang on a Can All Stars and the Mendelssohn Club Chorus in Philadelphia, April 26, 2014. It was awarded the 2015 Pulitzer Prize for Music.

The oratorio commemorates the history of the Northeastern Pennsylvania Coal Region, taking its name from anthracite, a form of coal that can be used for domestic fuel. The composer has called it a tribute to those who “persevered and endured in the Pennsylvania Anthracite coal region.”

== Background ==
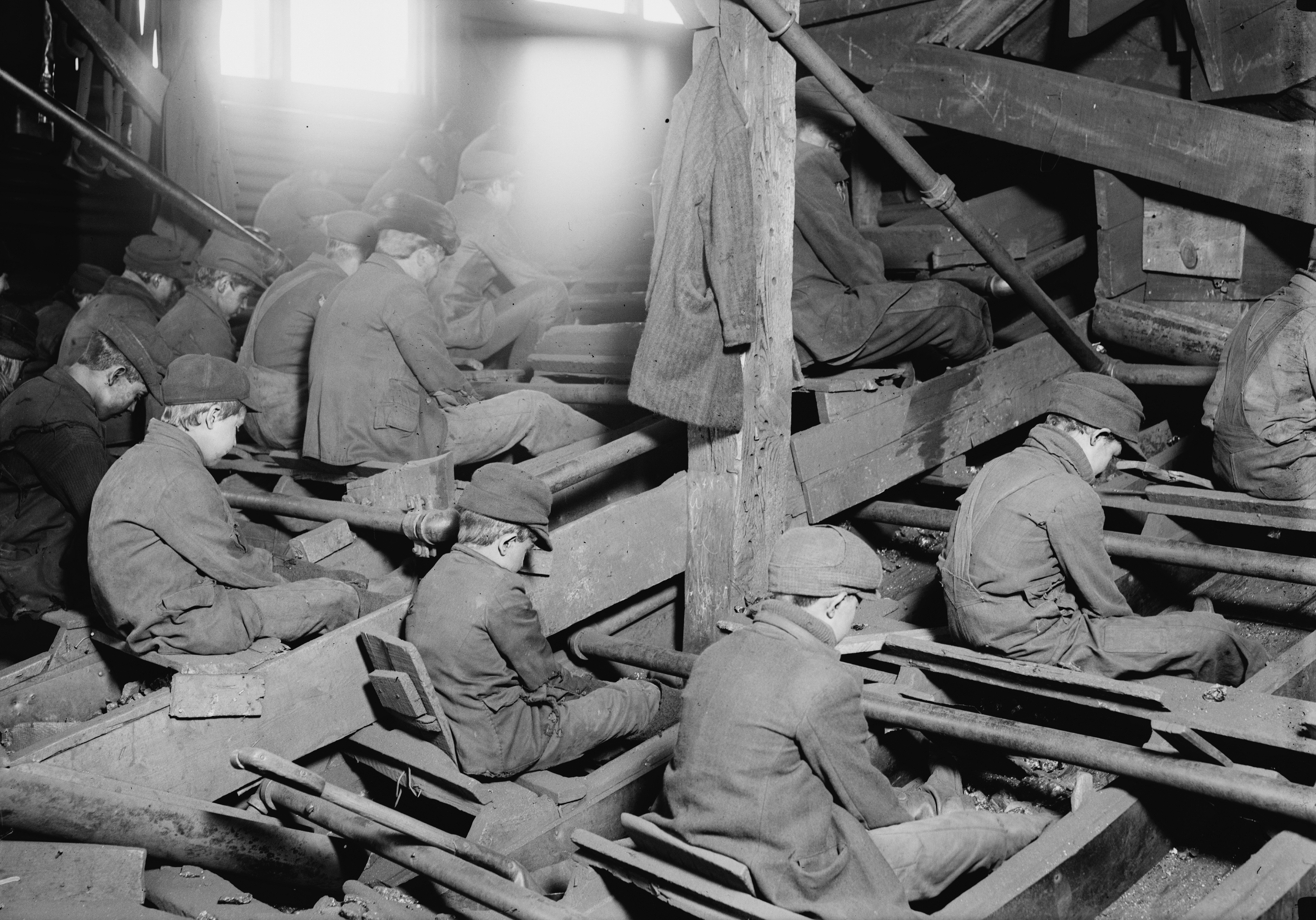
Breaker boys sort coal in an anthracite coal breaker near South Pittston, Pennsylvania, 1911.

On her inspiration and research for the composition, Wolfe wrote:

I was born in Philadelphia and am from a small town about an hour north of the city. When (Mendelssohn Club Artistic Director) Alan Harler called me about writing a piece I thought that I would look to the region. Where I grew up, if you took the long country road up to the highway, route 309, and turned right you’d be heading toward Philadelphia. If you turned left, which we hardly ever did, you would head in the direction of Wilkes-Barre and Scranton–coal country. We hardly ever turned left, maybe once in a while to go to a diner. So I thought that rather than looking toward the big city I’d look the other way. The Mendelssohn Club was incredible in setting me up with a guide to the region. Theater artist Laurie McCants, who has a company in Bloomsburg, PA became my guide. She had a library full of books on the region, about life in coal country. She took me to some amazing small local historical museums that depicted everything about the miners–from the tools they used to the medical facilities, to the disasters. For over a year I read a lot, interviewed miners and children of miners, gathered information, and went down into the mines. It’s a vast subject to cover, but powerful themes emerged and called out to be in the piece. Anthracite Fields is about this industry and the life surrounding it. The piece is not directly narrative, but looks at the subject from different angles. My intention was to honor the people that lived and worked there, this dangerous work that fueled the nation.

== Composition ==
Anthracite Fields runs about one hour. It combines elements of folk and classical music. Its libretto contains various oral histories, speeches, interviews, advertisements, and other texts from the history of the region.

The piece consists of five movements:

1. Foundation

This movement honors those who died in mining accidents in Pennsylvania from 1869 to 1916. Wolfe intended to sing the names of victims but was alarmed by the amount. She decided to shorten the list by only including those with the first name "John" then a last name with one syllable.

2. Breaker Boys

This movement is a tribute to the breaker boys: boys who were working in Pennsylvania mines and removed coal from coal breakers. The movement uses cowbell and bicycle pedals to portray the sound of coal falling into the breakers and uses the rhythm to give more of a "rock feel" to the piece.

3. Speech

In this movement, Julia Wolfe uses a speech by John L. Lewis who fought for safe working conditions for these miners.

4. Flowers

This movement was created and inspired by an interview conducted with Barbara Powell, the daughter and granddaughter of miners. In an interview, she stated, “We all had gardens” and began listing flower names.

5. Appliances

The words used in this movement were taken from a coal-powered railroad ad; coal during the 20th century was a fuel source for the nation, and this is the movement's theme. The movement ends with the story of Phoebe Snow, a historical railway advertising character, traveling to Buffalo while her "gown stays white from morn till night" – a quote from the railway company's advertising campaign.

== Reception ==
Its Pulitzer Prize citation calls it "a powerful oratorio for chorus and sextet evoking Pennsylvania coal-mining life around the turn of the 20th Century." Music critic Mark Swed of the Los Angeles Times praised the composition as "an unforgettably haunting, harrowing evocation of the plight of Pennsylvania's coal miners, incorporating many musical styles and effectively shadowy visuals."

The recording by Choir of Trinity Wall Street, conductor Julian Wachner, and Bang on a Can All Stars received a nomination for the 2016 Grammy Awards.
