= Fire in my mouth =

Musical composition

Julia Wolfe in 2012

Fire in my mouth is an oratorio for girls' choir, women's choir, and orchestra by the American composer Julia Wolfe. The work was commissioned by the New York Philharmonic under the direction of Jaap van Zweden and was completed in August 2018. Its world premiere was given by the Philadelphia-based chamber choir The Crossing, the Young People’s Chorus of New York City, and the New York Philharmonic led by Jaap van Zweden at David Geffen Hall, New York City, on January 24, 2019.

The piece was inspired by the infamous Triangle Shirtwaist Factory fire, which claimed the lives of 146 New York City garment workers—most of whom were young immigrant women—in 1911, and the political unrest surrounding it. The title of the piece comes from a quote by the labor activist Clara Lemlich, who later reflected on her years of activism saying, “Ah, then I had fire in my mouth.”

== Composition ==
Wolfe utilized a number of unconventional sounds in Fire in my mouth. The composer toured New York City's Garment District and other locations in search of a specific-sounding pair of scissors, which would later be used in performance by the women's choir as a prop and percussion instrument, before setting on a pair of 12-inch shears made by Wiss. The women's choir The Crossing rehearsed in Philadelphia during the weeks leading up to the premiere. The orchestra used other extended techniques to imitate the sounds of sewing machines and fire.

== Structure ==
Fire in my mouth has a performance duration of approximately one hour and is cast in four movements:

1. Immigration
2. Factory
3. Protest
4. Fire

The work's structure follows the narrative of the young factory workers as they immigrate to the United States, start work in the factory, protest unfair labor conditions, and are finally consumed by the inferno of the tragic factory fire.

== Instrumentation ==
The work is scored for women's choir, girls' choir, and a large orchestra comprising three flutes, three oboes (doubling cor anglais), three clarinets (doubling E-flat clarinet and bass clarinet), three bassoons (doubling contrabassoon), four horns, three trumpets, two trombones, bass trombone, tuba, timpani, four percussionists, harp, piano, electric guitar, electric bass, and strings.

== Reception ==
Reviewing the world premiere, Anthony Tommasini of The New York Times described Fire in my mouth as "ambitious, heartfelt, [and] often compelling," adding, "The big things are right in this tautly structured 60-minute piece in four parts." He described Wolfe's selection of texts as showing "great sensitivity" and her use of girls' and women's chorus as adding an "affecting touch." Nevertheless, Tommasini was somewhat critical of the work's multimedia elements, observing, "There are stretches in which the music of Fire in my mouth assumes its place in the multimedia whole a little too well. I liked it most when Ms. Wolfe went for something musically visceral or extreme, as in the climactic episode of 'Protest.'" David Hajdu of The Nation described the work as "an accomplishment on a level unmatched in [Wolfe's] previous work," writing, "Fire in my mouth is a monumental achievement in high musical drama, among the most commandingly imaginative and emotively potent works of any kind that I've ever experienced."

David Wright of the New York Classical Review also praised Wolfe's music, despite criticizing its narrative and some of the work's visual elements, which he described as "Ken Burns-style pan-and-scan of old photos, plus some rather obvious effects (ocean waves for the immigrants' trip, smoke tendrils for the fire)." He wrote, "Indeed, if anything about the experience transcended documentary, it was Wolfe's resourceful use of the enormous musical forces at her disposal." Wright concluded, "As an evocation of these young women's aspirations and the terrible thing that happened to them, Fire in my mouth was powerful and effective. One just wished this capable composer had set her sights higher than a good feel-bad piece."
