= Julia Wolfe =

American composer (born 1958)

- Wolfe at the 2012 Bang on a Can Marathon
- Born: December 18, 1958 (age 67); Philadelphia, Pennsylvania, U.S.
- Education: University of Michigan; Yale University; Princeton University
- Occupations: Composer, Professor of Music
- Spouse: Michael Gordon (m. 1984)
- Children: 2
- Website: juliawolfemusic.com

Julia Wolfe (born December 18, 1958) is an American composer and professor of music at New York University. According to The Wall Street Journal, Wolfe's music has "long inhabited a terrain of its own, a place where classical forms are recharged by the repetitive patterns of minimalism and the driving energy of rock".

A graduate of the University of Michigan, Wolfe co-founded the music collective Bang on a Can with Michael Gordon and David Lang. Her 2014 oratorio, Anthracite Fields, was awarded the 2015 Pulitzer Prize for Music. She has also received the Herb Alpert Award (2015) and was named a MacArthur Fellow (2016).

== Life ==
Born in Philadelphia, Wolfe has a twin brother and an older brother. As a teenager, she learned piano but she only began to study music seriously after taking a musicianship class at the University of Michigan, where she received a BA in music and theater as a member of Phi Beta Kappa in 1982. In her early twenties, Wolfe wrote music for an all-female theatre troupe.

On a trip to New York, she became friends with composition students Michael Gordon and David Lang, both of whom had recently attended the Yale School of Music and who encouraged her to apply. She went to Yale in 1984 and studied primarily with Martin Bresnick, and she married Michael Gordon the same year. After receiving her M.M. in 1986, Wolfe, Gordon, and Lang founded the new music collective Bang on a Can in 1987. Bang on a Can is now an organization with a concert series and tours, and a summer festival in the Berkshires for emerging composers and performers. Wolfe, Gordon, and Lang founded Red Poppy Music in 1993 as a printed music publishing company. The three founded the record label Cantaloupe Music in 2001.

Wolfe received a Fulbright Scholarship to travel to Amsterdam in 1992. In 2012, Wolfe received a PhD in composition from Princeton University. She has been a professor of music composition at New York University in the Steinhardt School since 2009, prior to which she was an adjunct professor at the Manhattan School of Music for seven years. In 2015, Wolfe won the Pulitzer Prize for music for her work Anthracite Fields, and in 2016 she was named a MacArthur Fellowship recipient. In 2018, she was a recipient of an honorary degree from Drew University in New Jersey. Wolfe held the 2021–22 Richard and Barbara Debs Composer's Chair at Carnegie Hall.

Wolfe and Gordon are married and have two children. They live in lower Manhattan.

== Music ==
Wolfe has written a major body of work for strings, from quartets to full orchestra. Her quartets, as described by The New Yorker magazine "combine the violent forward drive of rock music with an aura of minimalist serenity [using] the four instruments as a big guitar, whipping psychedelic states of mind into frenzied and ecstatic climaxes." Wolfe's Cruel Sister for string orchestra, inspired by a traditional English ballad of a love rivalry between sisters, was commissioned by the Munich Chamber Orchestra, received its US premiere at the Spoleto Festival USA, and was released (along with her other string orchestra piece, Fuel) on Cantaloupe Music. Written shortly after September 11, 2001, her string quartet concerto My Beautiful Scream, written for Kronos Quartet and the Orchestre National de France (premiered in the US at the Cabrillo Festival of Contemporary Music under the direction of Marin Alsop), was inspired by the idea of a slow motion scream. The Vermeer Room, Girlfriend, and Window of Vulnerability show Wolfe's ability to create vivid sonic images. Girlfriend, for mixed chamber ensemble and recorded sound, uses a haunting audio landscape that consists of skidding cars and breaking glass. The Vermeer Room, inspired by the Vermeer painting "A Girl Asleep"—which when x-rayed reveals a hidden figure—received its orchestral premiere with the San Francisco Symphony. In Window of Vulnerability, written for the American Composers Orchestra and conducted by Dennis Russell Davies, Wolfe creates a massive sonic universe of dense textures and fragile windows.

The influence of pop culture can be heard in many of Wolfe's works, including Lick and Believing for the Bang on a Can All-Stars. Lick, based on fragments of funk, has become a manifesto for the new generation of pop-influenced composers. The raucous My Lips From Speaking for six pianos was inspired by the opening riff of the Aretha Franklin tune "Think". Wolfe's Dark Full Ride is an obsessive and relentless exploration of the drum set, beginning with an extended hi-hat spotlight, while Lad is a piece for nine bagpipes.

Wolfe drew on oral histories, interviews, geography, local rhymes, and coal advertisements for her Pulitzer Prize–winning piece Anthracite Fields, an oratorio about the coal mining community of her native Pennsylvania which premiered in Philadelphia and was performed at the New York Philharmonic Biennial in the spring of 2014. In 2015–16, the Bang on a Can All-Stars, with first the Los Angeles Master Chorale and then the Danish Radio Vocal Society, gave Anthracite Fields its West Coast and European premieres, and Cantaloupe Music released the studio recording, featuring the Choir of Trinity Wall Street and the Bang on a Can All-Stars.

Wolfe's interest in labor history has informed her recent work, including Steel Hammer, an evening-length art-ballad that was a finalist for the 2010 Pulitzer Prize. The text is culled from more than 200 versions of the John Henry legend and based on hearsay, recollection, and tall tales that explore the subject of human versus machine. Premiered by the Trio Mediaeval and the Bang on a Can All-Stars, Steel Hammer was presented in a fully staged version by director Anne Bogart and her SITI Company at the University of Illinois, UCLA, Virginia Tech, OZ Arts Nashville, and BAM in 2015.

Following her folk interests and the tradition of body percussion in American folk music also led her to compose riSE and fLY, a concerto for body percussionist Colin Currie. The piece premiered in 2012 with the BBC Concert Orchestra, conducted by Keith Lockhart, and premiered in the Netherlands with the Codarts Ensemble and the United States with the Albany Symphony Orchestra in the 2014–15 season. Fire in my mouth, was commissioned by the New York Philharmonic and premiered at David Geffen Hall on January 25, 2019. The piece was based on extensive research into the Triangle Shirtwaist Factory Fire. Her most recent piece, UnEarth, draws heavily from scientific data surrounding climate change. It was commissioned by the New York Philharmonic and premiered at David Geffen Hall on June 1, 2023.

=== Music for film and theatre ===
Wolfe's work with film includes Fuel for the Hamburg-based Ensemble Resonanz and filmmaker Bill Morrison, and Impatience and Combat de Boxe for the Asko/Schönberg Ensemble and 1920s film experimentalist Charles Dekeukeleire.

Wolfe has collaborated with theater artist Anna Deavere Smith, architects Diller Scofidio + Renfro, filmmaker Bill Morrison, Ridge Theater, director François Girard, Jim Findlay, and choreographer Susan Marshall, among others. Her music has been heard at the Brooklyn Academy of Music, the Sydney Olympic Arts Festival, Settembre Musica (Italy), Théâtre de la Ville (Paris), Lincoln Center for the Performing Arts, and Carnegie Hall, and has been recorded on Cantaloupe Music, Teldec, Point/Universal, Sony Classical Records, and Argo/Decca. Wolfe received a 2000 Foundation for Contemporary Arts Grants to Artists Award.

Her music for theatre includes the score for Anna Deavere Smith's House Arrest, and she won an Obie Award for her score to Ridge Theater's Jennie Richie. She has composed a series of collaborative multimedia works with composers Michael Gordon and David Lang, including Lost Objects (Concerto Köln, directed by François Girard, libretto by Deborah Artman), Shelter (musikFabrik, Ridge Theater, libretto by Deborah Artman), and The Carbon Copy Building (with comic-book artist Ben Katchor). Wolfe created the citywide spectacle Traveling Music with architects Diller Scofidio + Renfro in Bordeaux, France, filling the streets of the old city with 100 musicians walking and riding in pedi-cabs.

=== Bang on a Can ===
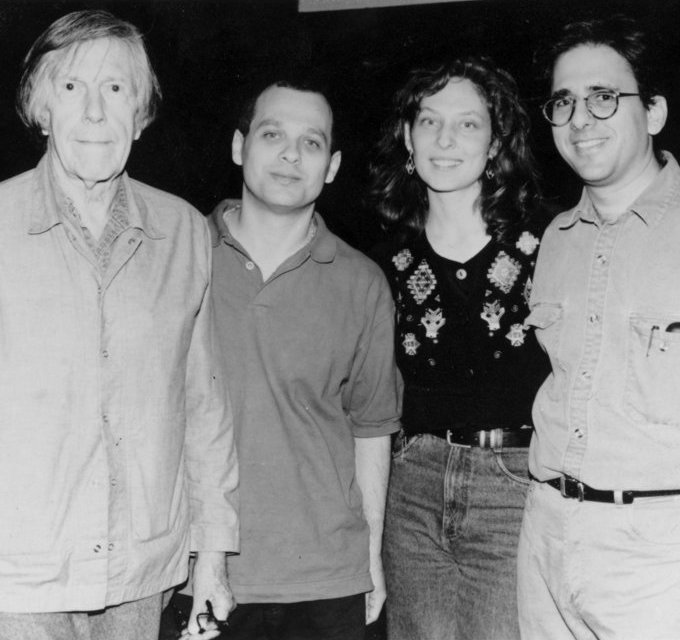
The three Bang on a Can founders (Wolfe (center right) with David Lang (far right), and Michael Gordon (center right)) with John Cage (far left) in 1982

Wolfe is one of the founders and artistic directors of Bang on a Can (alongside fellow composers Michael Gordon and David Lang), best known for its Marathon Concerts during which an eclectic mix of pieces are performed in succession over the course of many hours while audience members are welcome to come and go as they please. For the twentieth anniversary of their Marathon Concerts, Bang on a Can presented twenty-six hours of uninterrupted music at the World Financial Center Winter Garden Atrium in New York City. In 1992, Bang on a Can founded the chamber ensemble Bang on a Can All-Stars.

Among Bang on a Can's early events were performances by John Cage, premieres of Glenn Branca’s epic symphonies for massed electric guitars, and fully staged operas by Harry Partch, featuring the composer's original instruments.

Wolfe, Gordon, and Lang occasionally collaborate on jointly-composed large-scale staged works, often without revealing which sections each contributed. The opera The Carbon Copy Building, is a collaboration with comic book artist Ben Katchor, received the 2000 Village Voice Obie Award for Best New American Work. A projected comic strip accompanies and interacts with the singers, and the frames fall away in the telling of the story. Gordon, Wolfe and Lang have subsequently collaborated with writer Deborah Artman on the 'oratorio' Lost Objects, the recording of which was released in summer 2001 (Teldec New Line).

A further project, Shelter, is a multi-media work that was commissioned by the ensemble musikFabrik and features the Scandinavian vocalists Trio Mediaeval in a staged spectacle that, in the words of librettist Deborah Artman, "evokes the power and threat of nature, the soaring frontier promise contained in the framing of a new house, the pure aesthetic beauty of blueprints, the sweet architecture of sound and the uneasy vulnerability that underlies even the safety of our sleep." Shelter was premiered in Cologne, Germany in spring 2005, and received its US premiere in November 2005.

Both Shelter and Carbon Copy Building were staged by New York's Ridge Theater, in collaboration with Laurie Olinder (visual graphics), Bill Morrison (film-maker) and Bob McGrath (director). In 2017 Chinese singer Gong Linna premiered Cloud River Mountain, written by the three Bang on a Can composers in addition to Lao Luo. They also premiere Road Trip, a celebration of Bang on a Can's 30-year journey, together at the Brooklyn Academy of Music in October 2017.

== List of works ==
=== Orchestra ===
- Pretty (2023) – 20 minutes – Full orchestra
- Fountain of Youth (2019) – 9 minutes – 3(3).3.3.2(cbn)/4.3.3(btbn).1/timp.perc.pf/strings(ebgtr)
- Fuel (2007) – 21 minutes – String orchestra (min 65431)
- Cruel Sister (2004) – 35 minutes – str (min 65431)
- Tell me everything (1994) – 8 minutes – 111.asx.1/1110/2perc/hp.pf/str(amp 2vn, amp va, amp vc, amp db)
- Window of Vulnerability (1991) – 9 minutes – 3(2pic).3.3(bcl).2+cbn/4.3.3(btbn).1/timp.4perc/hp.syn.pf/str
- The Vermeer Room (1989) – 11 minutes – 1(afl).1.1(bcl).1/1.1.btbn.0/2perc/pf/hp/str(2vn, va, vc, db)
- Amber Waves of Grain (1988) – 8 minutes – 2(pic).222/432+btbn.1/4perc/hp/str

=== Soloist(s) and orchestra ===
- unEarth (2023) — 90 minutes — chorus, female voice, & orchestra
- Her Story (2022) — 40 minutes — 10 female voices & orchestra
- Flower Power (2020) — 35 minutes — amplified ensemble & orchestra
- Fire in my mouth (2018) – approx 60 minutes – multimedia oratorio for 146 female voices & orchestra
- riSE and fLY (2012) – 25 minutes – body percussion/street percussion & orchestra
- Steel Hammer (2009) – 75 minutes – 3 Singers, Appalachian & traditional instruments (Cello, Contrabass, 1 perc, 1 pno, el guit-bjo-dulc, ca/bcl)
- My Beautiful Scream (2003) – 25 minutes – Soloist(s): amplified string quartet, Orchestra: 3(pic).2+ca.2+bcl.2+cbn/4.3.2+btbn.1/4perc/amp pf.hp.ebgtr/str

=== Large ensemble (7 or more players) ===
- Anthracite Fields (2014) – 45 minutes – SATB chorus, cl, egtr, perc, pno, vc, db
- You breathe (2013) – 5 minutes – SATB + string quartet
- Combat de Boxe (2011) – 8 minutes – 1111/1111/2perc.hp.pf.egtr.acc/11111
- Guard My Tongue (2009) – 8 minutes – SATB
- Traveling Music (2009) – 100+ musicians of any type
- Thirst (2008) – 27 minutes – SATB and mixed ensemble
- Stronghold (2008) – 25 minutes – 8 Double Basses
- Lad (2007) – 14 minutes – Nine bagpipes
- Impatience (2005) – 37 minutes – 1(pic)111/1111/2perc/hp.pf.egtr/11111
- Steam (1995) – 7 minutes – fl, vc, eorg, Harry Partch instruments
- Arsenal of Democracy (1993) – 9 minutes – 1(pic).00.ssx+asx+barsx.0/132+btbn.0/bgtr/pf
- Girlfriend (1988) – 18 minutes – all instruments amplified: fl(afl,pic), cl(bcl), full-size MIDI kbd with Electric Organ sound, perc, twelve cheap wine glasses (to be stomped on, 2 per player), vn, vc, audio tape with click track

=== Soloist(s) and large ensemble (7 or more players) ===
- Accordion Concerto (True Love) (2005) – 20 minutes – Soloist(s): Accordion, Orchestra: 1.1.1(bcl).1/1.1.1.1/perc/hp.pf/str (1.1.1.1.1)

=== Works for 2–6 Players ===
- Retrieve (2016) – 10 minutes – cello and double bass
- Splendid hopes (2016) – 30 minutes – string quintet
- Blue Dress for string quartet (2015) – 10 minutes – string quartet
- Cha (2015) – 11 minutes – saxophone quartet
- Reeling (2012) – 5 minutes – cl, egtr, perc, pno, vc, db
- With a blue dress on (2010, rev. 2014) – 10 minutes – 5 violins/voice
- singing in the dead of night (2008) – 18 minutes – fl.cl/perc/pno/vn.vc
- Big Beautiful Dark and Scary (2002) – 9 minutes – amplified sextet: clar/b clar, perc, pf, egtr, vc, db
- Dark Full Ride (2002) – 18 minutes – four drum sets
- Close Together (2000) – 18 minutes – cello, percussion, electronic tape
- Believing (1997) – 9 minutes – amplified sextet
- Mink Stole (1997) – 10 minutes – vn, pf
- Dig Deep (1995) – 14 minutes – string quartet
- Lick (1994) – 8 minutes – all instruments amplified: ssx, perc, pf, egtr, vc, db
- my lips from speaking (1993) – 13 minutes – 6 pianos
- Early That Summer (1993) – 12 minutes – str4t
- Four Marys (1991) – 12 minutes – str4t
- On Seven-Star-Shoes (1985) – 6 minutes – fl(pic), ob, cl(bcl), bn, hn

=== Solo ===
- Spinning (2018) – 60 minutes – Cello
- Spinning Jenny (2016) – 4 minutes – Violin
- Emunah (2015) – 10 minutes – Cello
- Lass (2014) – 8 minutes – Flute
- Iron Maiden (2011) – 12 minutes – Percussion
- Compassion (2001) – 7 minutes – Piano
- Earring (2001) – 2 minutes – Piano
- East Broadway (1996) – 3 minutes – Toy piano, toy boombox

=== Collaborations ===
- Road Trip (2017) – 60 minutes. Music by Michael Gordon, David Lang, and Julia Wolfe. – cl, pno, perc, gtr, vc, db
- Cloud-River-Mountain (2015) – 20 minutes. Music by Michael Gordon, David Lang, Julia Wolfe, and Lao Luo. – soprano, cl, perc, gtr, piano, vc, db
- Water (2008) – 76 minutes. Music and text by Michael Gordon, David Lang, and Julia Wolfe. – SATB, 1.1.1.1(cbn)/1.1.1.0/2perc/pf/egtr/str(1.1.1.1.1) [all instruments and voices amplified]
- Shelter (2005) – 65 minutes. Music by Michael Gordon, David Lang, and Julia Wolfe. Text by Deborah Artman. – 3 Sop, fl, ob, cl, bn, hn, tpt, tbn, tba, pno, e gtr, e bgtr, perc, 2 vln, vla, vc, cb [all instruments and voices amplified]
- Lost Objects (2001) – 62 minutes. Music by Michael Gordon, David Lang, and Julia Wolfe. Text by Deborah Artman. – Sop, 2 countertenors, small chor, DJ, baroque orch, e gtr, e bgtr, perc, synth [all instruments and voices amplified]
- The Carbon Copy Building (1999) – 72 minutes. Music by Michael Gordon, David Lang, and Julia Wolfe. Text by Ben Katchor. – Cast: Ms, T, Bar, Bar/Ct, cl(bcl, cbcl, ssx)/perc/syn/egtr [all instruments and voices amplified]

=== Arrangements ===
- Music for Airports (1998) – 48 minutes – cl, egtr, perc, pno, vc, db

=== Film ===
- New York Composers: Searching for a New Music (1997). Directed by Michael Blackwood. Produced by Michael Blackwood Productions, in association with Westdeutscher Rundfunk. New York, New York: Michael Blackwood Productions.

== Selected recordings ==
- Anthracite Fields by Julia Wolfe with the Choir of Trinity Choir Wall Street, directed by Julian Wachner, and the Bang on a Can All-Stars (2015)
- Steel Hammer by Julia Wolfe with Trio Mediæval and the Bang on a Can All-Stars (2014)
- Cruel Sister by Julia Wolfe with Ensemble Resonanz (2011)
- Dark Full Ride by Julia Wolfe (2009)
- Julia Wolfe: The String Quartets including artists Ethel, Cassatt Quartet, and Lark Quartet (2003)
- Arsenal of Democracy by Julia Wolfe (2003)
- Lost Objects with artists Michael Gordon, David Lang, Deborah Artman, Roger Epple, Andrew Watts, Daniel Taylor, and Concerto Köln (2001)
