= Bang on a Can =

Contemporary classical music and multimedia collaborative

- Formation: 1987; 39 years ago
- Founders: Julia Wolfe; David Lang; Michael Gordon
- Founded at: New York City, New York, United States
- Purpose: Presenting new concert music
- Website: bangonacan.org

Bang on a Can is a multi-faceted contemporary classical music organization based in New York City. It was founded in 1987 by three American composers who remain its artistic directors: Julia Wolfe, David Lang, and Michael Gordon. Called "the country's most important vehicle for contemporary music" by the San Francisco Chronicle, the organization focuses on the presentation of new concert music, and has presented hundreds of musical events worldwide.

== Notable performances ==
Among Bang on a Can's early events were performances by John Cage, premieres of Glenn Branca’s epic symphonies for massed electric guitars, and fully staged operas by Harry Partch, featuring the composer's original instruments.

== Programs ==
=== Marathon Concerts ===
Bang on a Can is perhaps best known for its Marathon Concerts, during which an eclectic mix of pieces are performed in succession over the course of many hours while audience members, who are encouraged to maintain a "jeans-and-tee-shirt informality," are welcome to come and go as they please. For the twentieth anniversary of their Marathon Concerts, Bang on a Can presented twenty-six hours of uninterrupted music at the World Financial Center Winter Garden Atrium in New York City. During the COVID-19 pandemic of 2020 and 2021, the Marathon was moved online.

=== Long Play Festival ===
Starting in 2022, Bang on a Can expanded its one-day Marathon Concert to the annual three-day Long Play music festival. As of 2026, Bang on a Can has produced the annual at multiple simultaneous locations in Brooklyn, typically in early May.

=== Bang on a Can Summer Festival at MASS MoCA ===
Bang on a Can Summer Festival
- Genre: Experimental music, contemporary classical music
- Location: Massachusetts Museum of Contemporary Art (MASS MoCA)
- Years active: 2002-present
- Founders: Summer Institute of Music

In 2002, Bang on a Can began the yearly Summer Institute of Music, a program at the Massachusetts Museum of Contemporary Art (MASS MoCA) for young composers and performers. This program is sometimes referred to by the nickname "Banglewood" in reference to the nearby but far more traditional Tanglewood Music Festival.

=== Staged Works ===
The three artistic directors occasionally collaborate by jointly composing large staged works, often without revealing which sections each contributed. Examples include:

- The Carbon Copy Building - a "comic book opera" with words and drawings by MacArthur Grant recipient Ben Katchor. It was the winner of the 2000 Obie Award for Best Production.
- Lost Objects - a contemporary oratorio, with a libretto by Deborah Artman. It is a fusion of baroque music and modern soundscapes, rendered in performance by the original instruments ensemble Concerto Köln with four electronic instruments, three solo vocalists, a choir, and a live remix generated by DJ Spooky.
- The New Yorkers - a staged multimedia concert with additional contributions by filmmakers and visual artists including Ben Katchor, Bill Morrison, Doug Aitken, and William Wegman.
- Shelter - a multi-media work that, in the words of librettist Deborah Artman, "evokes the power and threat of nature, the soaring frontier promise contained in the framing of a new house, the pure aesthetic beauty of blueprints, the sweet architecture of sound and the uneasy vulnerability that underlies even the safety of our sleep."

=== People's Commissioning Fund (PCF) ===
Bang on a Can has commissioned and premiered pieces by composers including Steve Reich, Terry Riley, Michael Nyman, John Adams, Somei Satoh, Iva Bittová, Roberto Carnevale, Ornette Coleman, Donnacha Dennehy and Bun-Ching Lam. In 1998 the organization began the People's Commissioning Fund, which supports the creation of new musical compositions by pooling contributions from numerous member-commissioners whose donations range from $5 to $5,000.

==== List of PCF commissioned composers ====
- 1998 Virgil Moorefield, Pamela Z, Dan Plonsey
- 2000 Marc Mellits, Edward Ruchalski, Miya Masaoka, Toby Twining
- 2001 Jeffrey Brooks, Sussan Deyhim, James Fei, Keeril Makan
- 2002 Eve Beglarian, John King, Matthew Shipp
- 2003 Annea Lockwood, Ingram Marshall, Thurston Moore
- 2005 Cynthia Hopkins, Carla Kihlstedt, J.G. Thirlwell
- 2006 Yoav Gal, Annie Gosfield, John Hollenbeck
- 2007 Stefan Weisman, Joshua Penman, Lukas Ligeti
- 2008 Tristan Perich, Erdem Helvacioglu, Ken Thomson
- 2009 Kate Moore, Lok Yin Tang
- 2010 Oscar Bettison, Nik Baertsch, Christine Southworth, Dave Longstreth (of Dirty Projectors)
- 2011 Bryce Dessner (of The National), Karsh Kale, Nick Brooke
- 2012 Mira Calix, Florent Ghys, Christian Marclay, Nick Zammuto (of The Books)
- 2013 Anna Clyne, Dan Deacon, Jóhann Jóhannsson, Paula Matthusen
- 2014 Glenn Kotche, Jace Clayton (aka DJ/rupture), Ben Frost
- 2015 Caroline Shaw, Gabriella Smith, Zhang Shouwang
- 2016 Anna Thorvaldsdottir, Juan Felipe Waller, Nico Muhly

=== Bang on a Can All-Stars ===
The Bang on a Can All-Stars is an amplified sextet formed by its parent organization in 1992. The All-Stars tour internationally and have received awards and public recognition for their work in the contemporary classical music field.

The instrumentation of the Bang on a Can All-Stars is clarinet, cello, electric guitar, piano/keyboard, percussion, double bass. Current members include Vicky Chow, David Cossin, Arlen Hlusko, Mark Stewart and Ken Thomson.

=== Asphalt Orchestra ===
Asphalt Orchestra is Bang on a Can's 12-piece marching band. The ensemble's premiere performance was in 2009 at the Lincoln Center Out of Doors festival, and featured new commissioned works by Tyondai Braxton (of experimental rock group Battles), Goran Bregovic, and Stew and Heidi Rodewald, alongside arrangements of songs by Björk, Meshuggah, Charles Mingus, Conlon Nancarrow, and Frank Zappa.

The New York Times has called Asphalt Orchestra's members "12 top-notch brass and percussion players", and praised their performance as "coolly brilliant and infectious."

=== Found Sound Nation ===
An independent project founded in 2009 and produced by Bang on a Can, Found Sound Nation (FSN) engages at-risk youth and underrepresented communities producing original audio and video projects across the globe in economically disparate settings. The work of FSN emphasizes a mobile, accessible, collaborative way of recording and producing professional quality music, a technique developed by combining the art music traditions of Bang on a Can with traditions of musique concrète, hip hop, and contemporary composition.

FSN has led site-specific projects in New York City, India, Zimbabwe, Mexico, Italy, Switzerland and Haiti.

In 2012, the project received an award from the U.S. Department of State to produce OneBeat, an international music exchange which will bring together innovative musicians from around the world to compose, produce and perform original music.

Found Sound Nation was co-founded by Christopher Marianetti and Jeremy Thal. The project is directed by Marianetti, Thal and Elena Moon Park.

== Recordings ==
In the past, Bang on a Can released recordings on Composers Recordings Inc. (CRI), Sony Classical, Point Music (Universal), and Nonesuch, but now the majority of its recordings are found on its own record label, Cantaloupe Music. In addition to releasing works by Gordon, Wolfe, and Lang, the label releases CDs of music by composers and musical groups affiliated with the organization, including Evan Ziporyn, Phil Kline, Alarm Will Sound, Icebreaker, Ethel, Gutbucket, R. Luke DuBois, and Don Byron, among many others.

Below is a partial discography of released works performed by Bang on a Can:

=== Bang on a Can discography ===
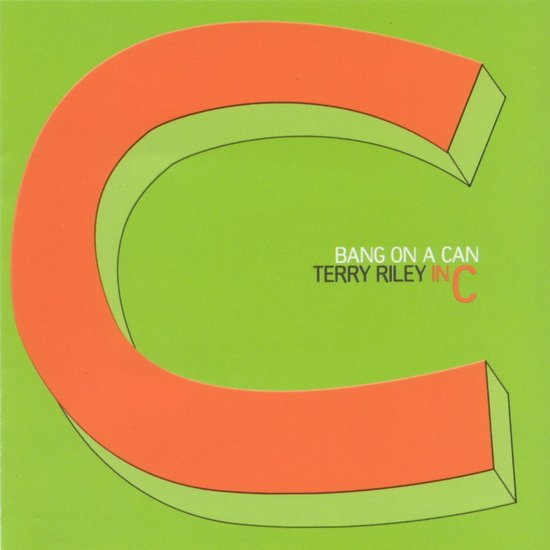
In C by Terry Riley

- Bang on a Can Live, volume 1 (1992)
- Bang on a Can Live, volume 2 (1993)
- Bang on a Can Live, volume 3 (1994)
- Industry (1995)
- Cheating, Lying, Stealing (1996)
- Music for Airports (composed by Brian Eno) (1998)
- Renegade Heaven (2001)
- Lost Objects (2001)
- In C (composed by Terry Riley) (2001)
- Bang on a Can Classics (2002)
- Gigantic Dancing Human Machine (music of Louis Andriessen) (2003)
- ShadowBang (composed by Evan Ziporyn) (2003)
- Music in Fifths / Two Pages (composed by Philip Glass) (2004)
- Bang on a Can Meets Kyaw Kyaw Naing (2004)
- Elida (composer and guest musician Iva Bittová) (2005)
- A Ballad for Many (composer and guest musician Don Byron) (2006)
- The Essential Martin Bresnick (2006)
- The Carbon Copy Building (2007)
- Music for Airports (Live) (2008)
- Music from the Film (Untitled) (2009)
- Double Sextet / 2x5 (music of Steve Reich) (2010)
- Big Beautiful Dark and Scary (2012)
- Shelter (Ensemble Signal) (2013)
- Field Recordings (2015)

== See also ==
- List of experimental music festivals
