= Anne Bogart =

American stage director (born 1951)

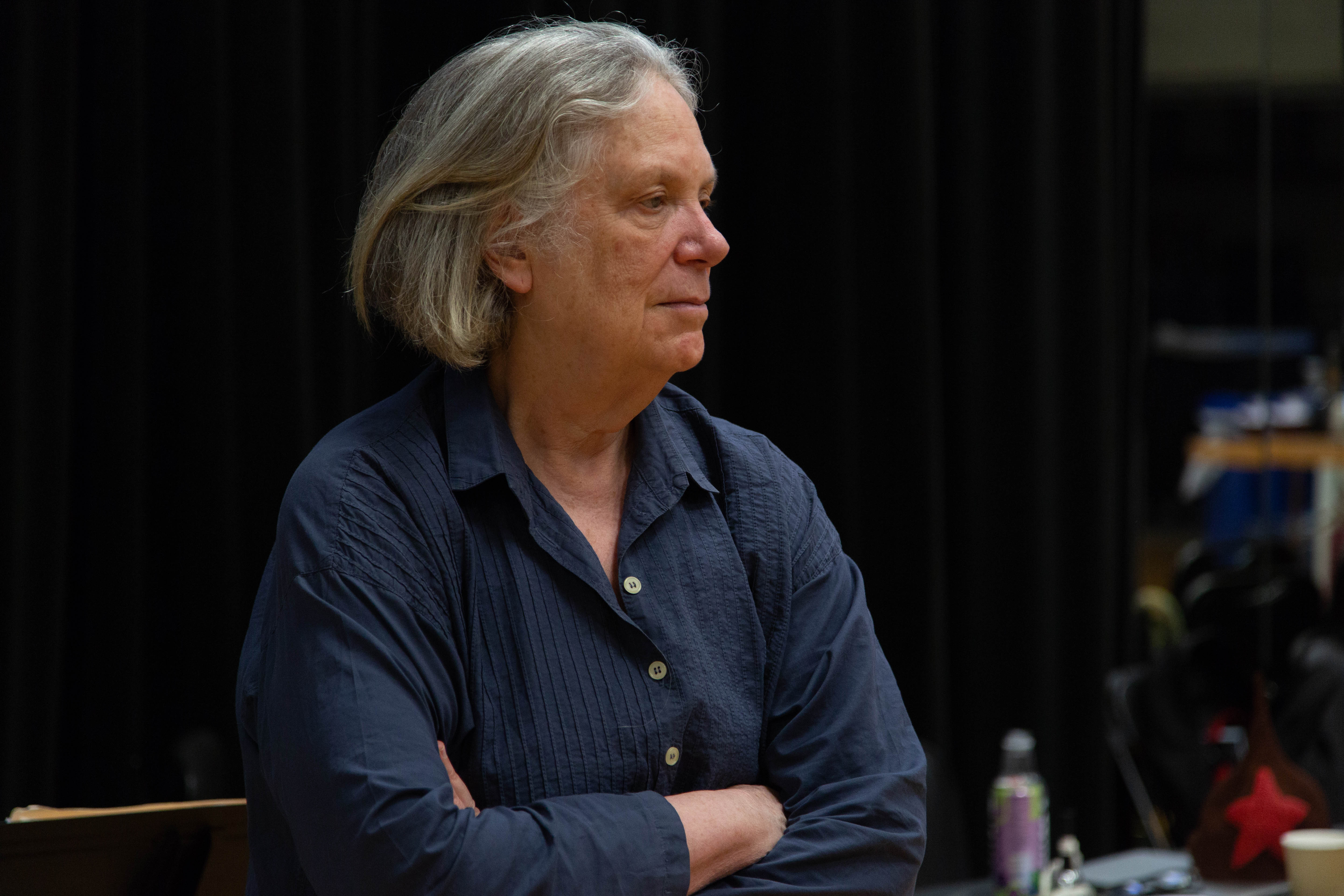
- Anne Bogart in 2019
- Born: September 25, 1951 (age 75); Newport, Rhode Island, U.S.
- Education: Bard College (BA); New York University (MFA)
- Occupations: Theatre director; opera director

Anne Bogart (born September 25, 1951) is an American theatre and opera director. She was one of the artistic directors of SITI Company, which she founded with Japanese director Tadashi Suzuki in 1992, until the company disbanded in 2022. She was a professor at Columbia University where she ran the Graduate Directing Concentration until 2026; And Then, You Act; What's the Story; and The Art of Resonance. She is a co-author, with Tina Landau of The Viewpoints Book, a "practical guide" to Viewpoints training and devising techniques. Conversations with Anne, a collection of interviews she has conducted with various notable artists was published in March 2012.

Bogart's influence is felt throughout the contemporary theatre: through the widespread adoption of SITI's training methods of Viewpoints and Suzuki, her oeuvre of groundbreaking productions, and her guidance at SITI and including at Columbia University of such diverse talents as Pavol Liska, Diane Paulus, James Dacre, Kim Weild, Jay Scheib, Sophie Hunter, Shura Baryshnikov, Darko Tresnjak, Robert O'Hara, Rachel Chavkin, Brian Swibel, and many others.

She is the granddaughter of Admiral Raymond Spruance.

== Career ==
In 1979, Bogart began teaching at the Experimental Theatre Wing of the New York University Tisch School of the Arts. There, she directed students in avant garde productions, including a 1984 staging of South Pacific for which she received a Bessie Award. Bogart set the show in a mental clinic for veterans who performed the musical as part of their therapy. The Rodgers and Hammerstein estate denied the production an extension.

Bogart was artistic director of Trinity Repertory Company for one season, from fall of 1989 to May 1990. With a year remaining on her contract, she was forced out when she refused to accept a 25 percent budget cut being imposed by the board. Bogart's season at Trinity Rep was controversial for being a departure from the previous programming, and came when the theater was already facing declining attendance and financial difficulties. Bogart later credited this experience as part of the inspiration for founding SITI Company, saying, "I learned you can't take over someone else's company. You have to create your own."

=== SITI Company ===
In 1988, Bogart visited Japanese director Tadashi Suzuki, who was becoming known for his physical method of actor training, and his theater company in Toga, Japan. After she left Trinity Rep, she began planning a project with Suzuki. This became the Saratoga International Theater Institute (SITI), which launched in September 1992 in Saratoga Springs, New York.

Suzuki's involvement was planned to be temporary. A resident company based in New York City evolved out of the Institute, SITI Company, which Bogart led as artistic director (and later co-artistic director) and with whom she directed dozens of productions until the company disbanded in 2022.

Bogart began teaching at Columbia University in 1993 as head of the graduate directing program. In 2022, it was announced that she would retire from Columbia in 2026.

== Awards and recognition ==
In 2018 the Leverhulme Trust awarded Bogart a Leverhulme Visiting Professorship at the Royal Central School of Speech and Drama.

In 2023, Bogart was honored with a Lifetime Achievement Obie Award.

Bogart was inducted into the Theater Hall of Fame in 2025.

== Works ==
=== Books ===
- A Director Prepares: Seven Essays on Art and Theater (2001) ISBN 978-1134556847
- The Viewpoints Book: A Practical Guidebook to Viewpoints and Composition co-written with Tina Landau (2005) ISBN 978-1559362412
- And Then You Act: Making Art in an Unpredictable World (2007) ISBN 978-1134128235
- Conversations with Anne: Twenty-two Interviews (2012) ISBN 978-1559363754
- What's the Story: Essays about Art, Theater and Storytelling (2014) ISBN 978-1317703686
- The Art of Resonance (2021) ISBN 978-1350155916

== See also ==
- Tadashi Suzuki
- SITI Company
- Viewpoints
