= Bang on a Can All-Stars =

Musical group

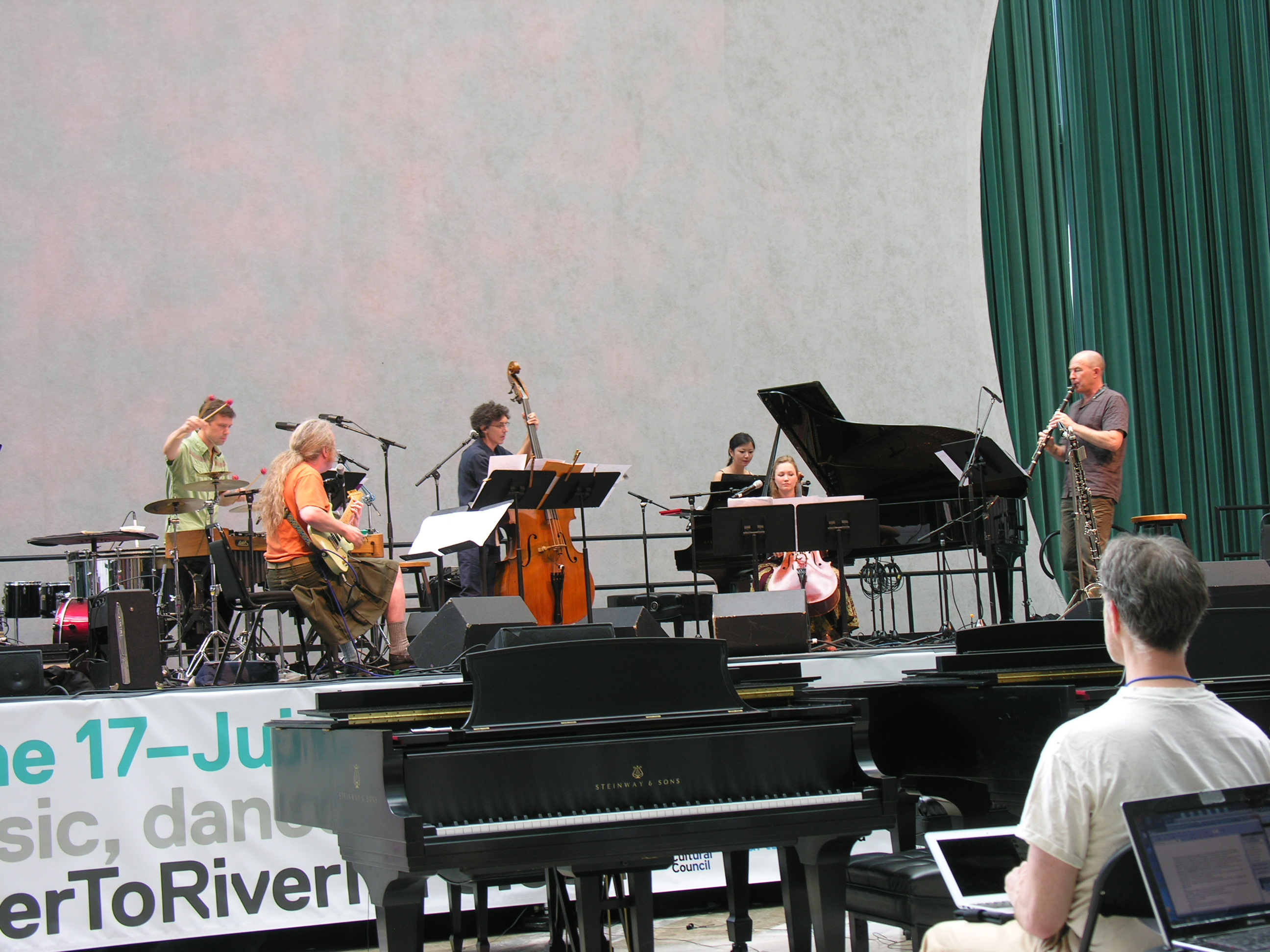
- Bang on a Can All-Stars perform at the Bang on a Can Marathon at the World Financial Center, June 2012.

Background information
- Origin: New York City, United States
- Genres: Alt classical, classical crossover, post-minimalism
- Years active: 1992–present
- Labels: Cantaloupe, Sony, CRI, Nonesuch
- Members: Mark Stewart; David Cossin; Vicky Chow; Ken Thomson; Arlen Hlusko
- Past members: Robert Black; Evan Ziporyn; Lisa Moore; Steve Schick, Maya Beiser; Wendy Sutter; Ashley Bathgate
- Website: bangonacanallstars

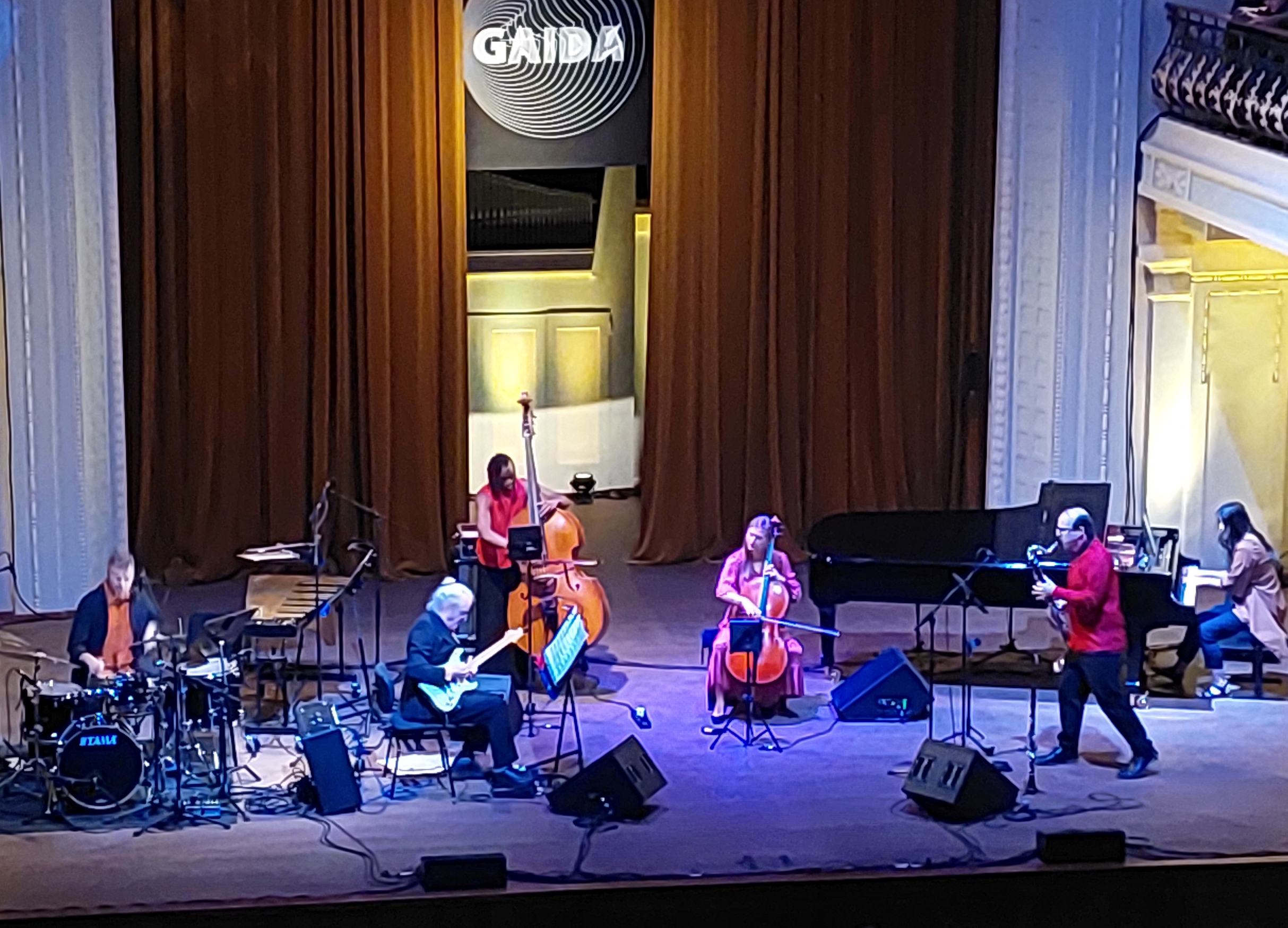
Bang on a Can All-Stars concert dedicated to the music of Ryuichi Sakamoto at the National Philharmonic in Vilnius on 20 October 2024.

The Bang on a Can All-Stars is an amplified ensemble that was formed in 1992 by parent organization Bang on a Can.

Called "a flexible and expert sextet" by The New York Times, the ensemble was formed as an agile group with a set instrumentation to take on touring and recording projects for Bang on a Can that would not be feasible for the organization's massive "Marathon" concert productions.

They appeared as guest stars in the season 17 episode of Arthur, "Binky's Music Madness", with Evan Ziporyn and Julia Wolfe as themselves.

== Instruments ==
The instrumentation of the Bang on a Can All-Stars is clarinet, cello, electric guitar, piano/keyboard, percussion, double bass. Current members include Vicky Chow, David Cossin, Arlen Husklo, Mark Stewart and Ken Thomson.

== Awards and recognition ==
In 2005 the All-Stars were named "Ensemble of the Year" by the Musical America International Directory of the Performing Arts. The ensemble has been heralded as "the country's most important vehicle for contemporary music" by the San Francisco Chronicle.

The very first release of the Cantaloupe Music catalog, the All-Stars' Renegade Heaven was ranked the #1 album of 2001 by New York Times classical music editor Allan Kozinn, and their recording of Terry Riley's In C made the 2001 New York Times top ten lists in both classical and pop.

Their recording of Julia Wolfe's oratorio Anthracite Fields in collaboration with the Choir of Trinity Wall Street and conductor Julian Wachner received a 2016 Grammy Award nomination.

== Discography ==
- Bang on a Can Live, volume 1 (1992)
- Bang on a Can Live, volume 2 (1993)
- Bang on a Can Live, volume 3 (1994)
- Industry (1995)
- Cheating, Lying, Stealing (1996)
- Lost Objects (1997)
- Music for Airports (composed by Brian Eno) (1998)
- Renegade Heaven (2001)
- In C (composed by Terry Riley) (2001)
- Bang on a Can Classics (2002)
- Gigantic Dancing Human Machine (music of Louis Andriessen) (2003)
- ShadowBang (composed by Evan Ziporyn) (2003)
- Music in Fifths / Two Pages (composed by Philip Glass) (2004)
- Bang on a Can Meets Kyaw Kyaw Naing (2004)
- Elida (composer and guest musician Iva Bittová) (2005)
- A Ballad for Many (composer and guest musician Don Byron) (2006)
- The Essential Martin Bresnick (2006)
- The Carbon Copy Building (2007)
- Music for Airports (Live) (2008)
- Music from the Film (Untitled) (2009)
- Double Sextet / 2x5 (music of Steve Reich) (2010)
- Big Beautiful Dark and Scary (2012)
- Shelter (Ensemble Signal) (2013)
- Field Recordings (2015)
