= Just (After Song of Songs) =

Song by Trio Mediaeval

from the album Youth
- Released: 2015
- Recorded: October 24, 2014
- Genre: Classical
- Length: 12:47
- Label: Milan Records
- Songwriter: David Lang

"Just (After Song of Songs)" is a 2014 song written by composer David Lang. The song was performed by the Norwegian vocal group Trio Mediæval, violist Garth Knox, cellist Agnes Vèsterman, percussionist Sylvain Lemêtre. In 2015, it was adapted for use in the soundtrack for the comedy-drama film Youth, directed by Paolo Sorrentino.

The song is based on language from the Song of Songs in the Old Testament. It has received widespread acclaim from various news sources and music review websites, including The New York Times, The Guardian, and New York Public Radio.

== Production ==
The song was originally commissioned by the Louth Contemporary Music Society as part of their 2014 album song of songs. Every song on the album was inspired by the Old Testament Song of Songs, and it included music by composers David Lang, Luciano Berio, and Betty Olivero. The pieces were performed for the first time at a Louth Contemporary Music Society concert in Drogheda, Ireland, on October 24, 2014.

The recording of "Just (After Song of Songs)" was a collaboration between the Norwegian vocal group Trio Mediaeval, violinist Garth Knox, cellist Agnes Vèsterman, percussionist Sylvain Lemêtre.

In 2014, film director Paolo Sorrentino asked David Lang to create a soundtrack for his comedy-drama movie, Youth. Lang decided to include his previous song, "Just (Song After Songs)," in the movie soundtrack. In the context of the movie, The Independent called the song "a wonderfully intimate work of subtle sensuality."

== Themes ==
The Old Testament Song of Songs is known for its focus on the passionate love between a man and a woman. Lang uses only language found in the Song of Songs, in order to emphasize the intimacy of this kind of relationship. Lang has stated that he uses the relationship between man and woman as a metaphor for the relationship between man and God.

== Style ==
The song is written in a simple, repetitive style, with every line starting with either "just your," "and my," or "our." These are meant to represent the different voices (male and female) found in the Song of Songs. Any line that is structured as "just your [blank]" represents the male voice, "and my [blank]" represents the female voice, and "our [blank]" represents shared ownership.

== Reception ==
The song has received wide praise from a variety of news sources and music critics. Andy Gill, of The Independent, summarized the song as consisting of "descending close-harmonies listing lovers’ qualities in an hypnotic, incantatory manner." Chris Voss, of Classical Boston Radio, called the piece "simple but compelling." Fiona Maddocks, of The Guardian, called the piece "bewitching and incantatory."

The song has also been performed and recorded by other musical groups, most notably the YIVO Institute for Jewish Research in 2018.

The song was sampled by multiple prominent musical artists, including American singer Mike Posner and British indie pop band the xx.
