= Sumi Jo =

South Korean operatic soprano (born 1962)

Sumi Jo OSI
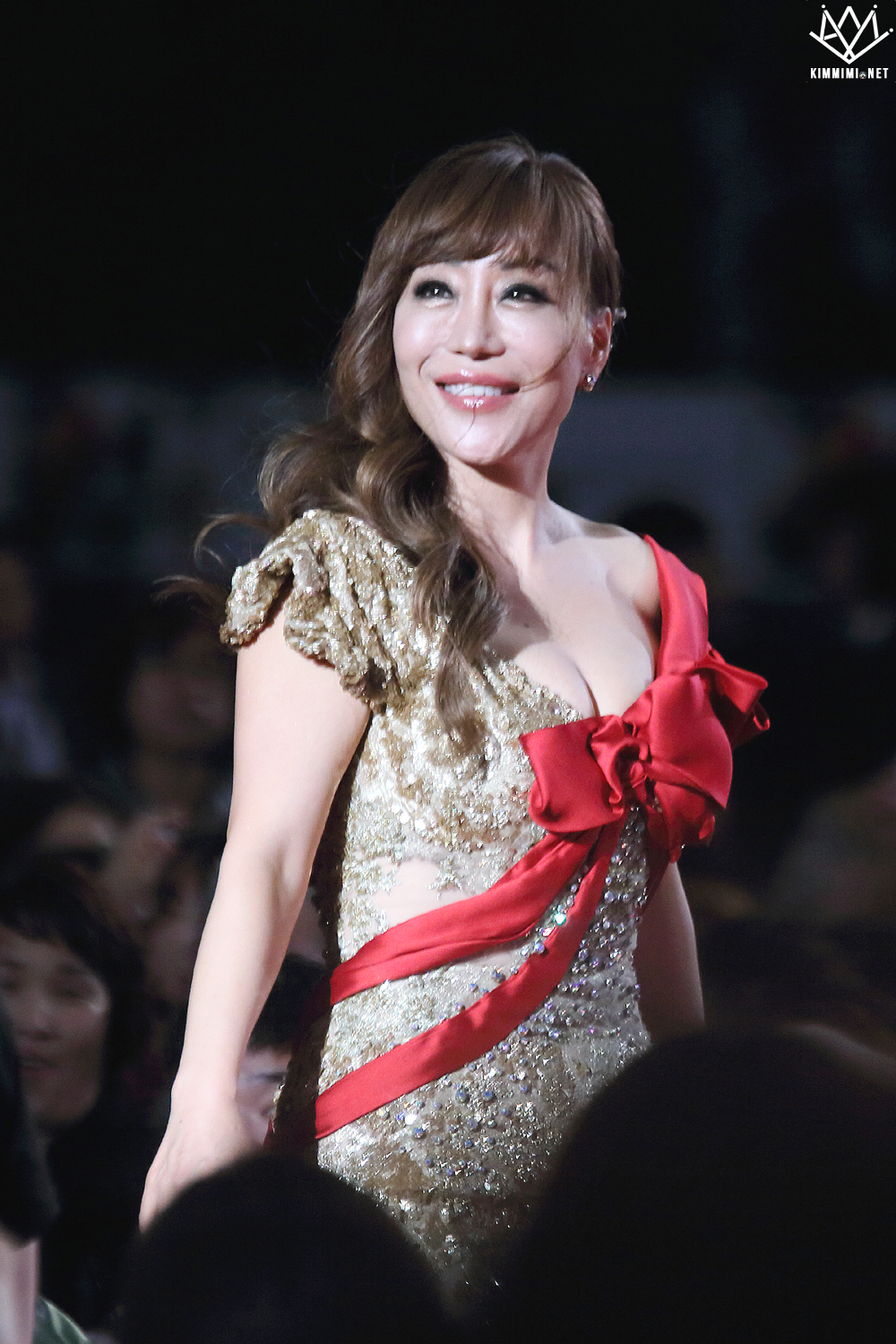
- Jo in 2015
- Born: 22 November 1962 (age 63); Changwon, South Korea
- Occupation: Lyric coloratura soprano
- Years active: 1986–present
- Awards: Geumgwan Order of Cultural Merit (2023)

Korean name
- Hangul: 조수경
- Hanja: 曺秀敬
- RR: Jo Sugyeong
- MR: Cho Sugyŏng

Stage name
- Hangul: 조수미
- Hanja: 曺秀美
- RR: Jo Sumi
- MR: Cho Sumi
- IPA: [t͡ɕo sumi]

Sumi Jo, OSI (Korean: 조수미; Korean pronunciation: [t͡ɕo sumi]; born 22 November 1962) is a South Korean lyric coloratura soprano known for her Grammy Award-winning interpretations of the bel canto repertoire.

== Early life ==
Jo was born Jo Su-gyeong [tɕo sʰuɡjʌŋ] in Changwon, South Korea. Her mother was an amateur singer and pianist who had been unable to pursue her own professional music studies because of politics in Korea during the 1950s. Determined to provide her daughter with opportunities she never had, Jo's mother enrolled her in piano lessons when she was 4 years old, and voice lessons when she was 6. Although they lived in a rented property, her parents bought a piano for her to play. Her mother raised and trained Jo strictly. Jo recalled even when her mother went out, she locked the door outside so that Jo could not play truant. As a child, Jo would often spend up to eight hours a day studying music.

In 1976, Jo entered the Sun Hwa Arts School from which she graduated in 1980, receiving dual diplomas in voice and piano. She entered the department of vocal music at the Seoul National University (SNU) with the best practical score since the department had opened. There she continued her music studies from 1981 to 1983. While studying at SNU, Jo made her professional recital debut, appeared in several concerts with the Korean Broadcasting System, and made her professional operatic debut as Susanna in The Marriage of Figaro with Seoul Opera.

In 1983, Jo left SNU to study at the Conservatorio Santa Cecilia in Rome. Among her teachers were Carlo Bergonzi and Giannella Borelli. While Jo studied in Italy, she was frequently heard in concert in Italian cities and on national radio broadcasts and telecasts. It was during this time when Jo began to use "Sumi" as her stage name in order to make her name more friendly to European language speakers who often found it difficult to pronounce Su-gyeong. She graduated in 1985 with majors in keyboard and voice.

Following graduation, Jo began to study with Elisabeth Schwarzkopf and won several international competitions in Seoul, Naples, Enna, Barcelona, and Pretoria. In August 1986, she was unanimously awarded first prize in the Carlo Alberto Cappelli International Competition in Verona, one of the world's most important contests, open only to first-prize winners of other major competitions.

== Career ==
In 1986, Jo made her European operatic debut as Gilda in Verdi's Rigoletto at the Teatro Comunale Giuseppe Verdi in Trieste. This performance drew the attention of Herbert von Karajan, who proceeded to cast her as Oscar in Un ballo in maschera opposite Plácido Domingo for the 1989 Salzburg Festival. Karajan's death during festival rehearsals prevented Jo from actually singing on stage under his baton (Georg Solti conducted the performances) but she did sing under Karajan in the studio recording of Ballo, made in the early months of 1989 for Deutsche Grammophon.

In 1988, Jo made her La Scala debut as Thetis in Niccolò Jommelli's Fetonte. That same year she made her debut with the Bavarian State Opera and sang Barbarina in The Marriage of Figaro at the Salzburg Festival.

In 1989, Jo made her debut with the Vienna State Opera and returned to the Salzburg Festival to sing Oscar in Verdi's Un ballo in maschera. That same year, she made her debut with the Metropolitan Opera, once again portraying Gilda in Rigoletto. Jo would later reprise this role numerous times with the Met over the next fifteen years.

In 1990, Jo made her debut with the Chicago Lyric Opera as the Queen of the Night in Mozart's The Magic Flute. The following year, she returned to the Metropolitan Opera for another performance as Oscar in Un ballo in maschera and made her Royal Opera, Covent Garden, debut as Olympia in The Tales of Hoffmann. She returned to Covent Garden the next year to sing Adina in L'elisir d'amore and Elvira in I puritani.

In 1993, Jo appeared in the title role of Donizetti's Lucia di Lammermoor with the Metropolitan Opera and sang the role of the Queen of the Night at the Salzburg Festival and Covent Garden. The following year she made her debut with Los Angeles Opera as Sophie in Strauss' Der Rosenkavalier. In 1995 she sang the role of Countess Adèle in Le comte Ory at the Aix-en-Provence Festival.

Over the next decade Jo maintained a busy schedule, singing Lucia in Strasbourg, Barcelona, Berlin, and Paris; La sonnambula in Brussels and Santiago, Chile; I Capuleti e i Montecchi with Minnesota Opera; Olympia and Rosina in New York; the Queen of the Night in Los Angeles; Gilda in Bilbao, Oviedo, Bologna, Trieste, and Detroit among others; Il turco in Italia in Spain; L'enfant et les sortilèges in Boston and Pittsburgh; Le comte Ory in Rome; and Dinorah in New York. She also appeared in performances at the Théâtre du Châtelet, Théâtre des Champs-Élysées, Opéra National de Paris, Washington Opera, the Deutsche Oper Berlin, Opera Australia, and the Teatro Colón.

In addition, she appeared with numerous symphony orchestras in concert, including the Vancouver Symphony Orchestra, the Cincinnati Pops, the Orchestra of St. Luke's, the Vienna Philharmonic, the London Philharmonic Orchestra, the Los Angeles Philharmonic, and the Hollywood Bowl Orchestra among others. Her work led her to sing under such conductors as Sir Georg Solti, Zubin Mehta, Lorin Maazel, James Levine, Kent Nagano, and Richard Bonynge. She also gave recitals throughout Europe, the United States, Canada, and Australia.

In 2002, Jo sang the theme song for the Korean Broadcasting System's broadcast of the 2002 FIFA World Cup, "The Champions". In 2007, she performed her first Violetta in La traviata with the Toulon Opera and in the 2008/2009 season she was scheduled to perform the role of Zerline in Fra Diavolo at the Opera Comique and Opéra Royal de Wallonie. In 2008, Jo participated in the Beijing Olympics with Renée Fleming and Angela Gheorghiu. In 2011, she provided the singing voice of Veda Pierce in the HBO miniseries Mildred Pierce.

On 9 March 2018, Jo performed a specially-recorded duet with fellow vocalist Sohyang, the song "Here As One", during the opening ceremony of the 2018 Winter Paralympic Games in Pyeongchang, South Korea.

In 2021, Jo was appointed as the visiting distinguished professor at KAIST's Graduate School of Culture Technology. In October 2023, she was awarded the first-class Geumgwan Order of Cultural Merit for her contributions to the promotion of Korean culture.

=== Academy Award nomination and exclusion ===
"Simple Song Number 3", written by David Lang, performed by Jo, and featured in Paolo Sorrentino's 2015 film Youth, was nominated for an Academy Award in 2016 in the Best Song category. Fellow nominees were "Manta Ray", performed by Anohni; "Til It Happens to You", performed by Lady Gaga; "Earned It", performed by The Weeknd; and "Writing's on the Wall", performed by Sam Smith (who won the category's award). Although Jo was invited to the ceremony and attended, she was not invited to perform the song. Anohni, a transgender singer, was similarly excluded and subsequently boycotted the ceremony. The other nominees performed their songs during the ceremony.

On the red carpet prior to the ceremonies, Jo and Lang voiced their disappointment with the producers' decision to exclude the song, indirectly referencing the controversy related to that year's Academy Awards and its lack of racial diversity.

== Personal life ==
Jo is the cousin aunt of South Korean actor Yoo Gun, his father's cousin sister.

Just before she performed Ave Maria at Chatelet, Paris, in 2006, Jo's father, Eonho Jo, died. When she learned that her father had died, she wanted to cancel the performance and return to South Korea for the funeral. Her mother reminded Jo of her promise to her audiences, and said that it was better if she went on with the show in honor of her father. Her performance was dedicated to her father and released as a DVD titled Sumi Jo in Paris – For my Father.

Jo is an advocate for animal rights and one of only five Asian celebrities to make People for the Ethical Treatment of Animals Asia-Pacific's (PETA) first-ever Best-Dressed 2008 list.

Jo's mother, Malsoon Kim died in 2021 after suffering from Alzheimer's for 10 years in hospital. She was unable to attend to her mother's funeral in South Korea due to COVID-19 quarantine, while she was in Italy.

== Legacy ==
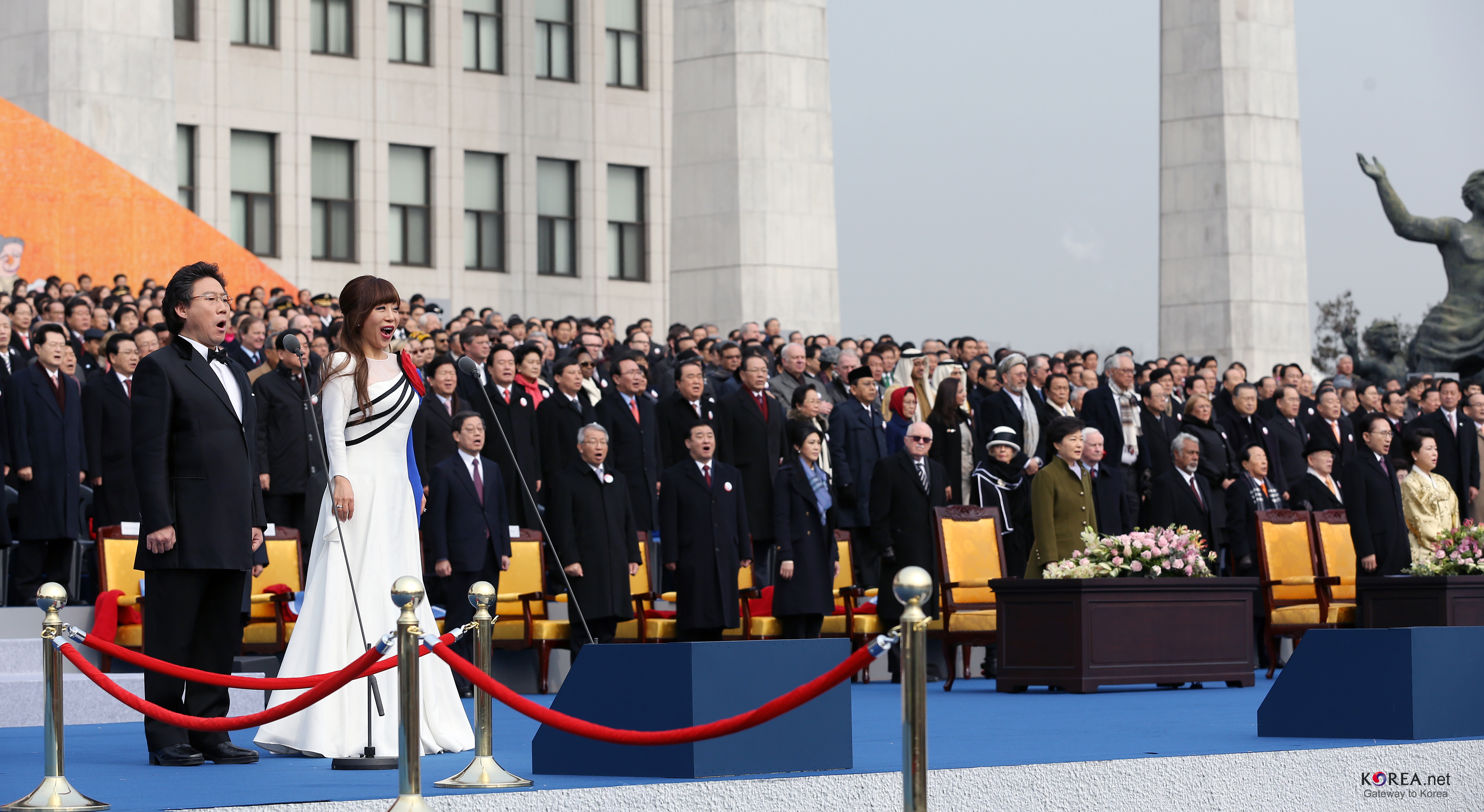
Sumi Jo performs the South Korean national anthem, Aegukga at the inauguration of President Park Geun-hye, February 2013

Aria of Zerbinetta in Ariadne auf Naxos, written by Richard Strauss in 1912, is a difficult piece over 20 minutes in length with numerous high notes. Therefore, Strauss modified part of the sheet music because he thought it was impossible to sing. In 1994, however, Jo became the world's first artist to record the unedited original version of the song. She recorded the song with a Japanese-American conductor, Kent Nagano, in Lyon, France. Jo said it was the hardest record to sing ever. In 1993, she became the first Asian soprano to win La Siola d'Oro. In addition, Jo won six international competitions for the first time as an Asian soprano, and was recorded as the first Asian prima donna who starred in the world's opera theaters.

"Her voice is the best gift God has given," said Herbert von Karajan, who is considered as one of the greatest conductors of the 20th century, and praised her as "a voice from above". Karajan also admired, "I am surprised that you have learned in Korea, are there such excellent teachers in Korea? Korea is a great nation". The New York Metropolitan Theater Opera News praised "her song has already risen above the criticism". Le Monde of France praised her vocals by saying that "Even fairies listen to her songs".

== Recordings ==
Jo has released over 40 albums since her European operatic debut in 1986. This list is adapted from Jo's Melon profile, her official website, and other sources as noted.

=== Albums as principal artist ===
- Carnaval! French Coloratura Arias (Decca Records, January 1994)
- Saeya Saeya (새야 새야) (Nices, June 1994)
- Virtuoso Arias (Erato Records, August 1994)
- Peter and the Wolf (Korean version) (Erato Records, March 1995)
- Ari Arirang (아리 아리랑) (Nices, September 1995)
- Sumi Jo Sings Mozart (Erato Records, 1995)
- Bel Canto (Erato Records, 1996)
- Live At Carnegie Hall (Erato Records, 1997)
- La Promessa (Erato Records, September 1998)
- Les Bijoux (Erato Records, December 1998)
- Echoes from Vienna: Tribute to Johann Strauss (Erato Records, April 1999)
- Only Love (Erato Records, March 2000) — sold 1,055,170 copies in South Korea
- Opera Love (Decca Records, December 2000)
- Prayers (Erato Records, January 2001)
- The Christmas Album (Erato Records, September 2001)
- Hyangsu (향수) (ENE Media, September 2002)
- Be Happy: Falling In Love With Movie (Warner Classics, July 2004)
- Baroque Journey (Warner Classics, January 2006)
- Sumi Jo 101 (Warner Music, December 2007)
- Missing You (Deutsche Grammophon, October 2008)
- The Sumi Jo Collection (Warner Classics, August 2009)
- Ich Liebe Dich (Deutsche Grammophon, January 1, 2010)
- Libera (Deutsche Grammophon, January 1, 2011)
- La Luce: Sumi Jo Sings Igor Krutoy (Universal Music, December 27, 2012)
- Only Bach: Cantatas For Soprano, Violin & Guitar (Deutsche Grammophon, January 1, 2014)
- Longing (그.리.다.) (Universal Music, August 27, 2015)
- La Prima Donna: 30th Debut Anniversary (Universal Music, August 23, 2016)
- Mother (Universal Music, April 18, 2019)
- LUX3570, collaboration with I Musici (Decca Records, December 10, 2021)
- In Love (사랑할 때) (Warner Music, December 6, 2022)

=== Opera recordings ===
- Rossini: Le comte Ory (Philips Classics Records, 1988)
- Strauss: Die Frau ohne Schatten (Decca Records, 1989)
- Verdi: Un ballo in maschera (Deutsche Grammophon, 1989)
- Mozart: The Magic Flute (Decca Records, 1990)
- Rossini: Il turco in Italia (Philips Classics Records, 1991)
- Mozart: The Magic Flute (Decca Records, 1992)
- Auber: Le domino noir (Decca Records, 1993)
- Strauss: Ariadne auf Naxos (Virgin Classics, 1994)
- Rossini: Tancredi (Naxos Records, 1994)
- Offenbach: The Tales of Hoffmann (Erato Records, 1996)
- Adam: Le toréador (Decca Records, 1997)
- Bellini: Norma (Decca Records, 2013)

=== Other album appearances ===
- Philharmonie Berlin: Gala Opera Concert (Capriccio, 1988)
- Mahler: Symphony No. 8 in E flat major 'Symphony of a Thousand' (Deutsche Grammophon, 1990)
- Rossini: Messa di Gloria (Philips Classics Records, 1992)
- Orff: Carmina Burana (Warner Classics, 1992)
- Requiem After J.S. Bach (Black Box Classics, 1995)
- Ave Maria: The Myth of Mary (Teldec, 1999)
- "Mirame Bailar" from the Korean version of Rhythm & Romance by Kenny G (Concord Records, 2008)

=== Singles ===
Title	Year	Notes
"Hijo de la Luna" (달의 아들)	2011	Track from Libera
"Dream Of Pyeongchang" (평창의 꿈) (Remastered)	2013	Official theme of the 2018 Winter Olympics
"Moon Flower" (with Secret Garden)	2014	
"We Are One" (우리는 하나야) (with YB)	2015	Theme song of the 2015 DMC Festival
"I'm a Korean" (with Yoon Il-sang)	2019	Released for the 100th anniversary of the March 1st Movement
"Life Is A Miracle" (with Giovanni Allevi and Federico Paciotti)	2020	Charity single
"Guardians" (수호신) (with Rain)	2021	Promotional single for Universe
"Cuore Indigo" (with Yiruma)	2021	
"We Will Be One" (함께)	2022	Cheering song for Busan's bid for Expo 2030
"Love Love"	2023	

=== Soundtrack appearances ===
Title	Year	Album
"Vocalise"	1999	The Ninth Gate (Original Motion Picture Soundtrack)
"Songin" (송인 (送人))	2000	Hur Jun OST
"If I Leave" (나 가거든)	2001	Empress Myeongseong OST
"Lets Forget Now" (이젠 잊기로 해요)	2006	Famous Seven Princesses OST
"Memory of Love" (사랑의 기억)	2006	Jumong OST
"Der Hölle Rache kocht in meinem Herzen" (from Mozart's The Magic Flute) (with Vienna Philharmonic)	2010	Eat Pray Love (Original Motion Picture Soundtrack)
"Love Never Dies" (Korean version)	2010	Love Never Dies: Asian Edition
"Qui La Voce" (from Bellini's I puritani)	2011	Mildred Pierce (Music From The HBO Miniseries)
"I'm Always Chasing Rainbows"	2011	Mildred Pierce (Music From The HBO Miniseries)
"Simple Song #3"	2015	Youth (Music From the Motion Picture)
"Day Without You" (그대 없는 날)	2015	The Himalayas OST
"Oriental Performance"	2018	Loro (Original Motion Picture Soundtrack)
"Fight For Love (Aria for Myth)"	2021	Sisyphus: The Myth OST
"Dandelion" (민들레야)	2022	Curtain Call OST
"My Day" (내겐 오늘)	2023	Maestra: Strings of Truth OST

=== DVD ===
- Sumi Jo in Paris – For My Father (2006)

== Filmography ==
=== Cinema ===
Year	Title	Role
2015	Youth	Herself

=== Web shows ===
Year	Title	Role	Ref.
2022	Take 1	Participant	

== Awards and honors ==
Award	Year	Category	Nominee / work	Result	Ref.
Viotti International Music Competition	1985	Voice	Sumi Jo	Won	
Zonta International Competition (Italy)	1985	—N/a	Sumi Jo	Won	
Concurs Tenor Viñas (Spain)	1985	Female Voice	Sumi Jo	Won	
Unisa International Music Competition (South Africa)	1986	Voice	Sumi Jo	Won	
Carlo Alberto Cappelli International Prize (Italy)	1986	—N/a	Sumi Jo	Won	
Hong Nanpa Memorial Award (South Korea)	1992	—N/a	Sumi Jo	Won	
Grammy Awards	1993	Best Opera Recording	Die Frau ohne Schatten (Note: With Hildegard Behrens, José van Dam, Plácido Domingo, Reinhild Runkel, Júlia Várady, Vienna Philharmonic, Georg Solti (conductor); and Christopher Raeburn, Stephen Trainor, and Morten Winding (producers).)	Won	
Siola d'oro	1993	—N/a	Sumi Jo	Won	
Kim Swoo-geun Performing Arts Awards (South Korea)	1994	—N/a	Sumi Jo	Won	
Grammy Awards	1996	Best Opera Recording	Tancredi (Note: With Anna Maria di Micco, Lucretia Lendi, Stanford Olsen, Ewa Podleś, Pietro Spagnoli, Capella Brugensis Chorus, Collegium Instrumentale Brugense, Alberto Zedda (conductor), and Gunter Appenheimer (producer).)	Nominated	
KBS Overseas Compatriot Award (South Korea)	1996	—N/a	Sumi Jo	Won	
Korea-China Youth Academic Awards	1996	Music Division	Sumi Jo	Won	
Puccini Prize (Italy)	2008	—N/a	Sumi Jo	Won	
Daewon Music Award (South Korea)	2013	Grand Prize	Sumi Jo	Won	
Premio Tiberini d'oro (Italy)	2015	—N/a	Sumi Jo	Won	
Bravo Awards (Russia)	2018	Best Female Performer Award	Sumi Jo	Won	
Korea Image Awards	2022	Cornerstone Award	Sumi Jo	Won	
Samsung Ho-Am Prize Awards	2026	Arts Award	Sumi Jo	Won	
Premio Internazionale Maria Callas	2026	Maria Callas Special Award	Sumi Jo	Won	

=== State and cultural honors ===
Country or organization	Year	Honor	Ref.
France	2025	Ordre des Arts et des Lettres, Commandeur	
Italy	2018	Order of the Star of Italy	
South Korea	1995	Order of Culture Merit	
South Korea	2006	Proud Korean Award	
