= Lloris =

Lloris is a surname of Catalan origin. It is prevalent throughout the nations of Spain and France. Notable people with the surname include:

- Enedina Lloris (born 1957), Valencian Spanish soprano
- Gautier Lloris (born 1995), French footballer
- Hugo Lloris (born 1986), French footballer
- Silvia Lloris (born 2004), Spanish footballer

== See also ==
- Loris (disambiguation)
- Lorris, a commune in the Loiret department in north-central France
