= 73rd Golden Globe Awards =

Film award ceremony in 2016

- Official poster
- Date: January 10, 2016
- Site: The Beverly Hilton, Beverly Hills, California, U.S.
- Hosted by: Ricky Gervais

Highlights
- Best Film: Drama: The Revenant
- Best Film: Musical or Comedy: The Martian
- Best Drama Series: Mr. Robot
- Best Musical or Comedy Series: Mozart in the Jungle
- Best Miniseries or Television movie: Wolf Hall
- Most awards: The Revenant (3)
- Most nominations: Carol (5)

Television coverage
- Channel: NBC

The 73rd Golden Globe Awards honored the best in film and American television of 2015. It was broadcast live on January 10, 2016, from The Beverly Hilton in Beverly Hills, California beginning at 5:00 p.m. PST / 8:00 p.m. EST by NBC. The ceremony was produced by Dick Clark Productions in association with the Hollywood Foreign Press Association. The nominations were announced on December 10, 2015, at The Beverly Hilton by Angela Bassett, America Ferrera, Chloë Grace Moretz, and Dennis Quaid. Denzel Washington was announced as the Cecil B. DeMille Lifetime Achievement Award honoree on November 16, 2015. Ricky Gervais hosted the show for the fourth time. The Martian, Mozart in the Jungle, Mr. Robot, The Revenant, and Steve Jobs were among the films and television shows that received multiple awards.

== Winners and nominees ==
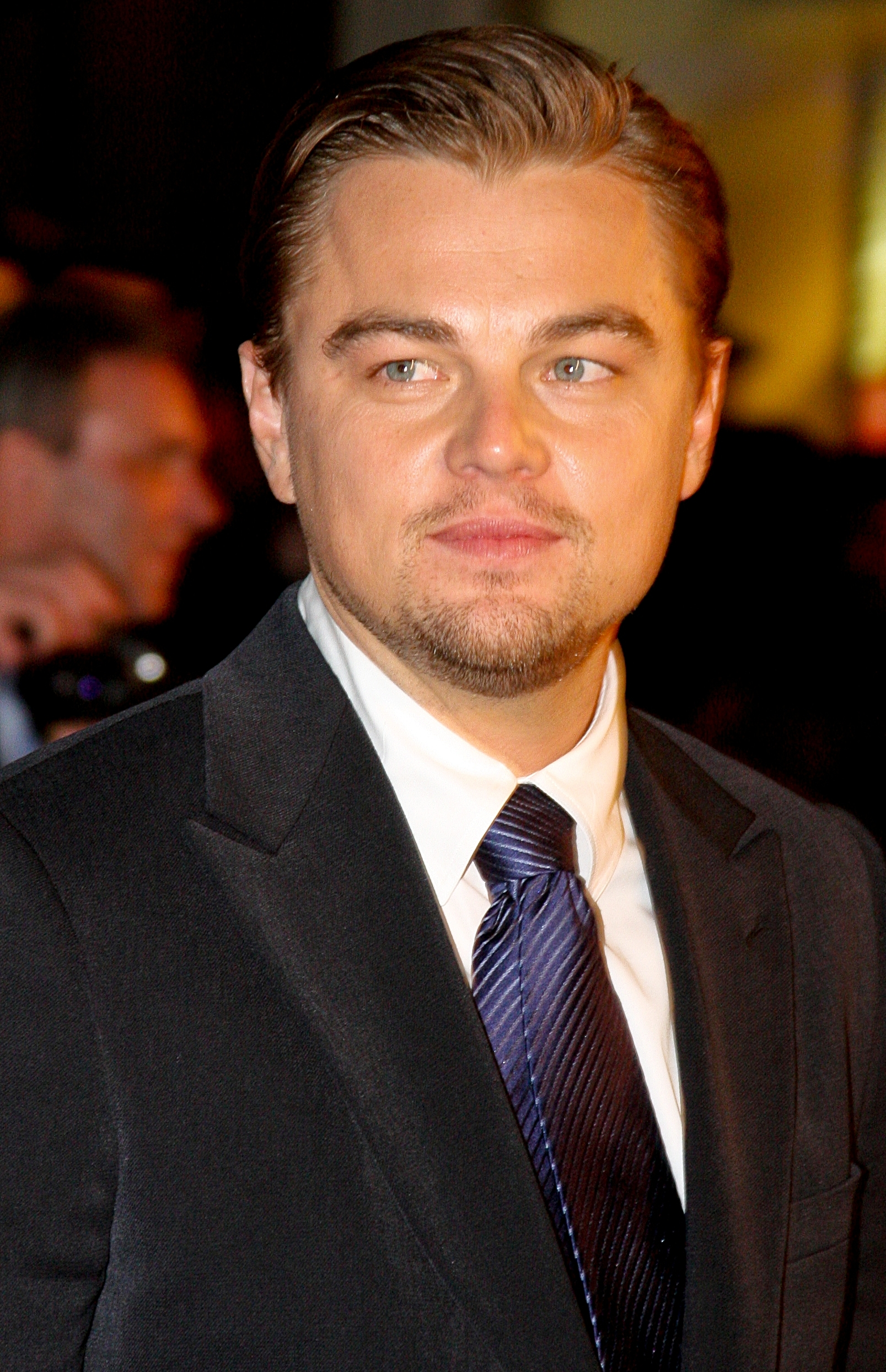
Leonardo DiCaprio, Best Actor in a Motion Picture – Drama winner

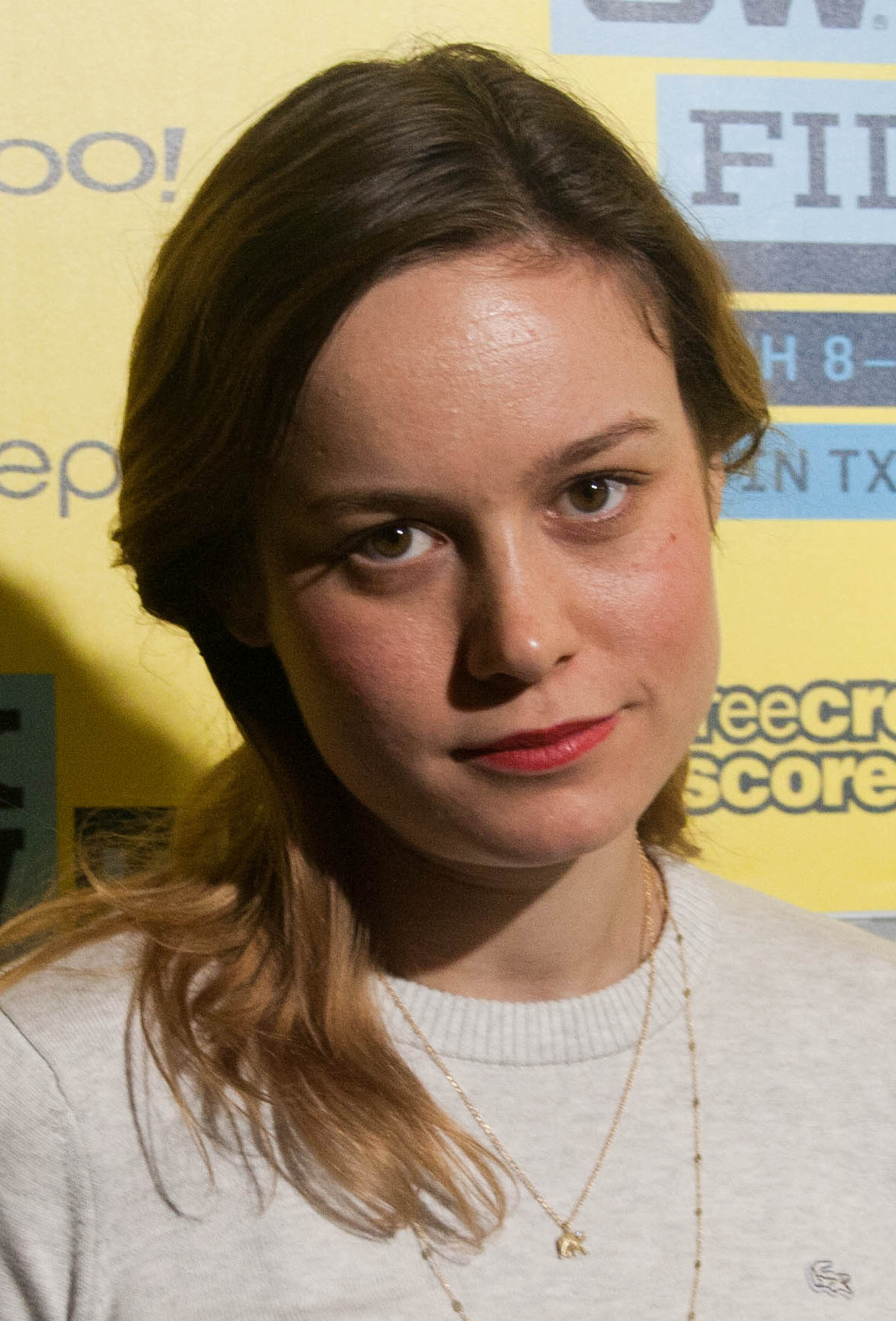
Brie Larson, Best Actress in a Motion Picture – Drama winner

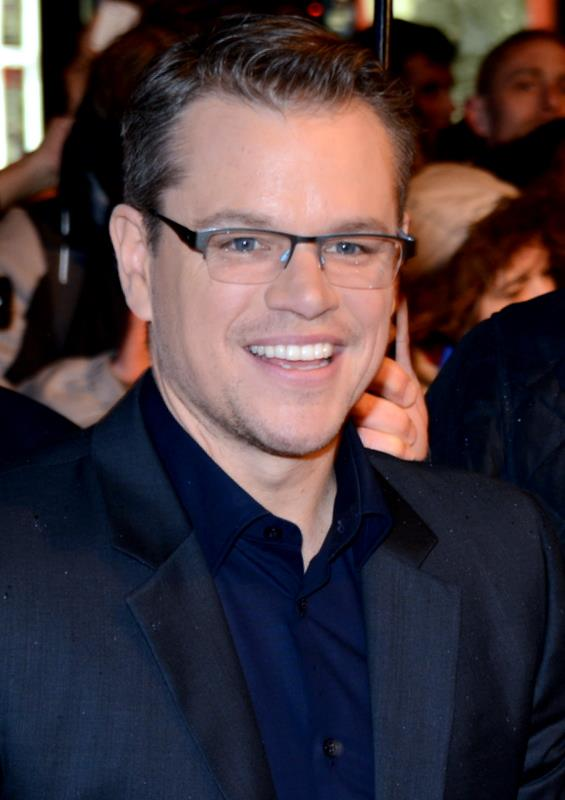
Matt Damon, Best Actor in a Motion Picture – Musical or Comedy winner

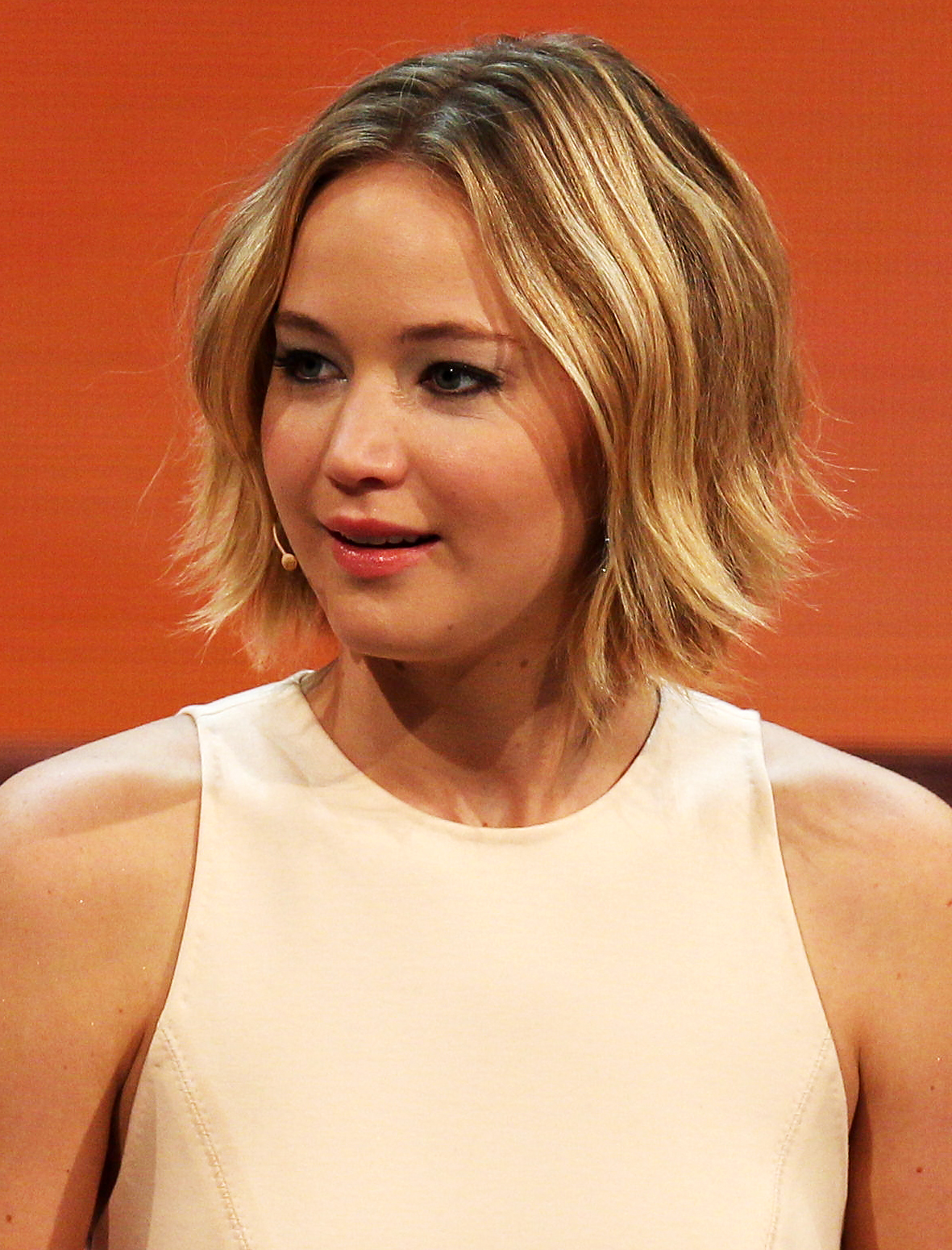
Jennifer Lawrence, Best Actress in a Motion Picture – Musical or Comedy winner

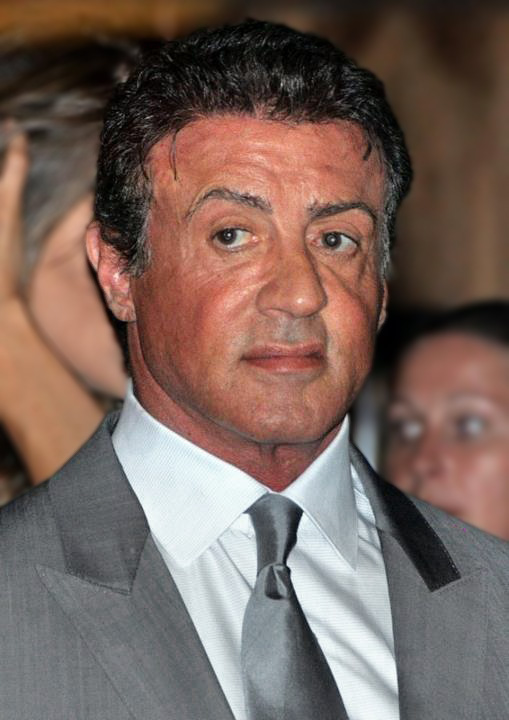
Sylvester Stallone, Best Supporting Actor winner

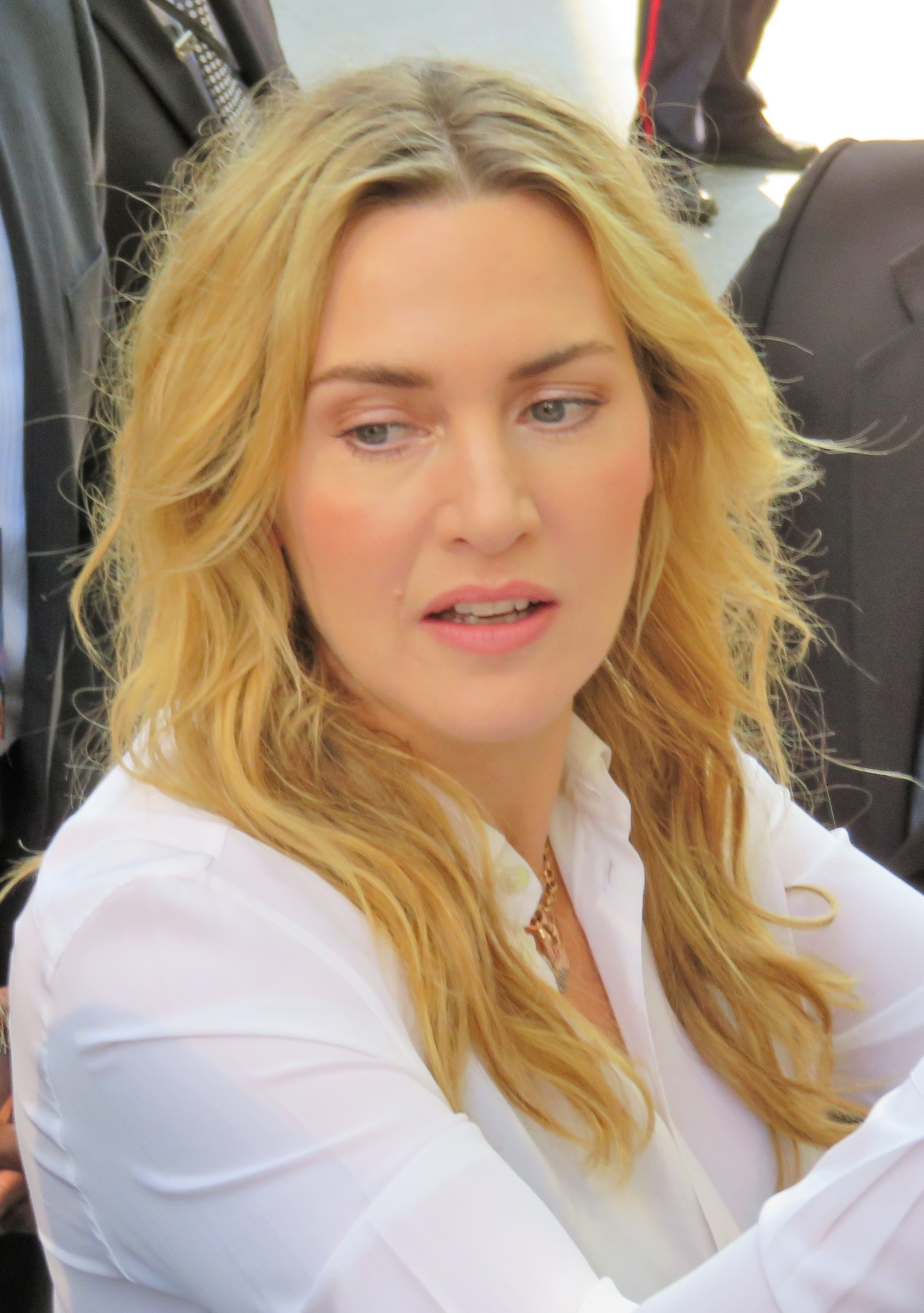
Kate Winslet, Best Supporting Actress winner

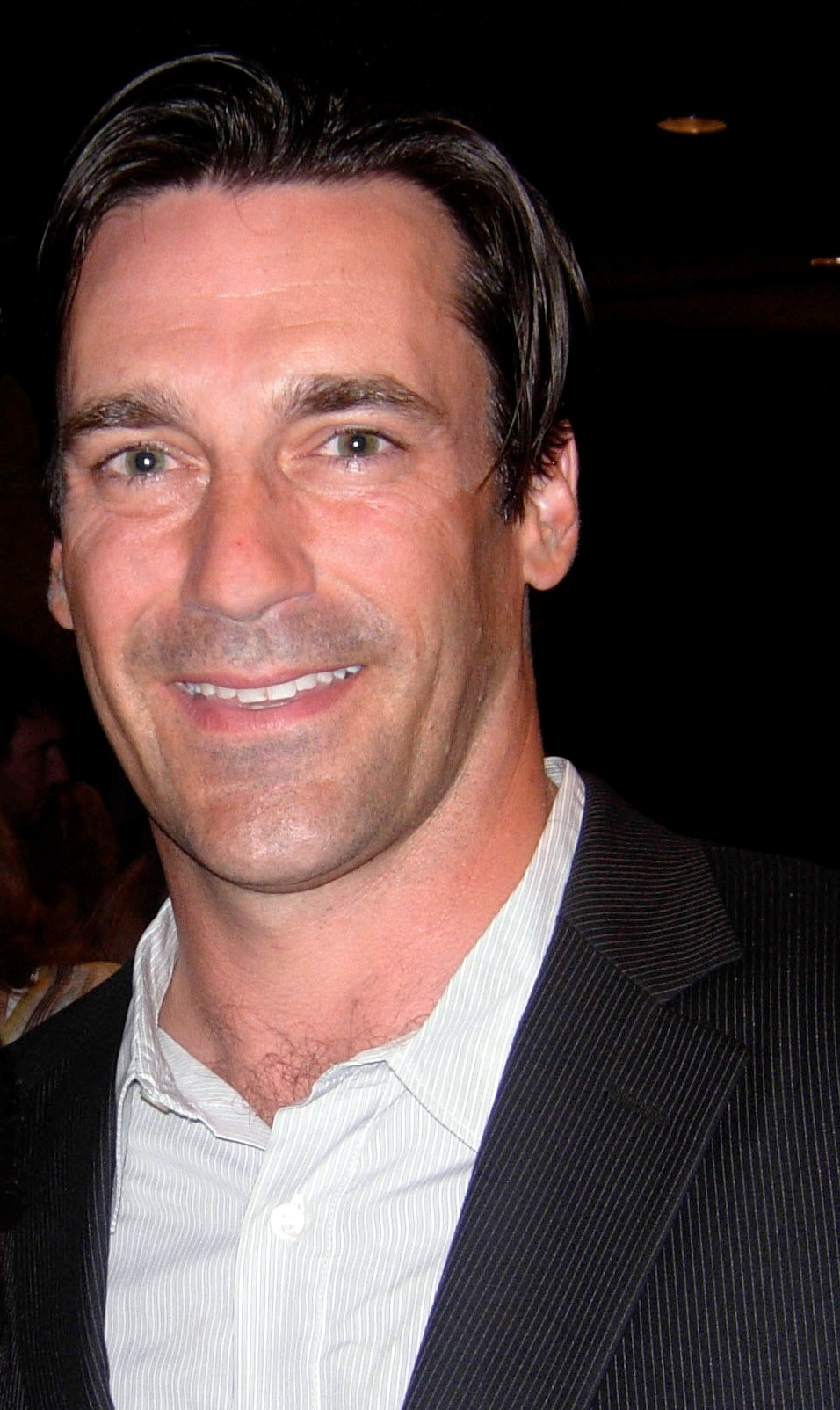
Jon Hamm, Best Actor in a Television Series – Drama winner

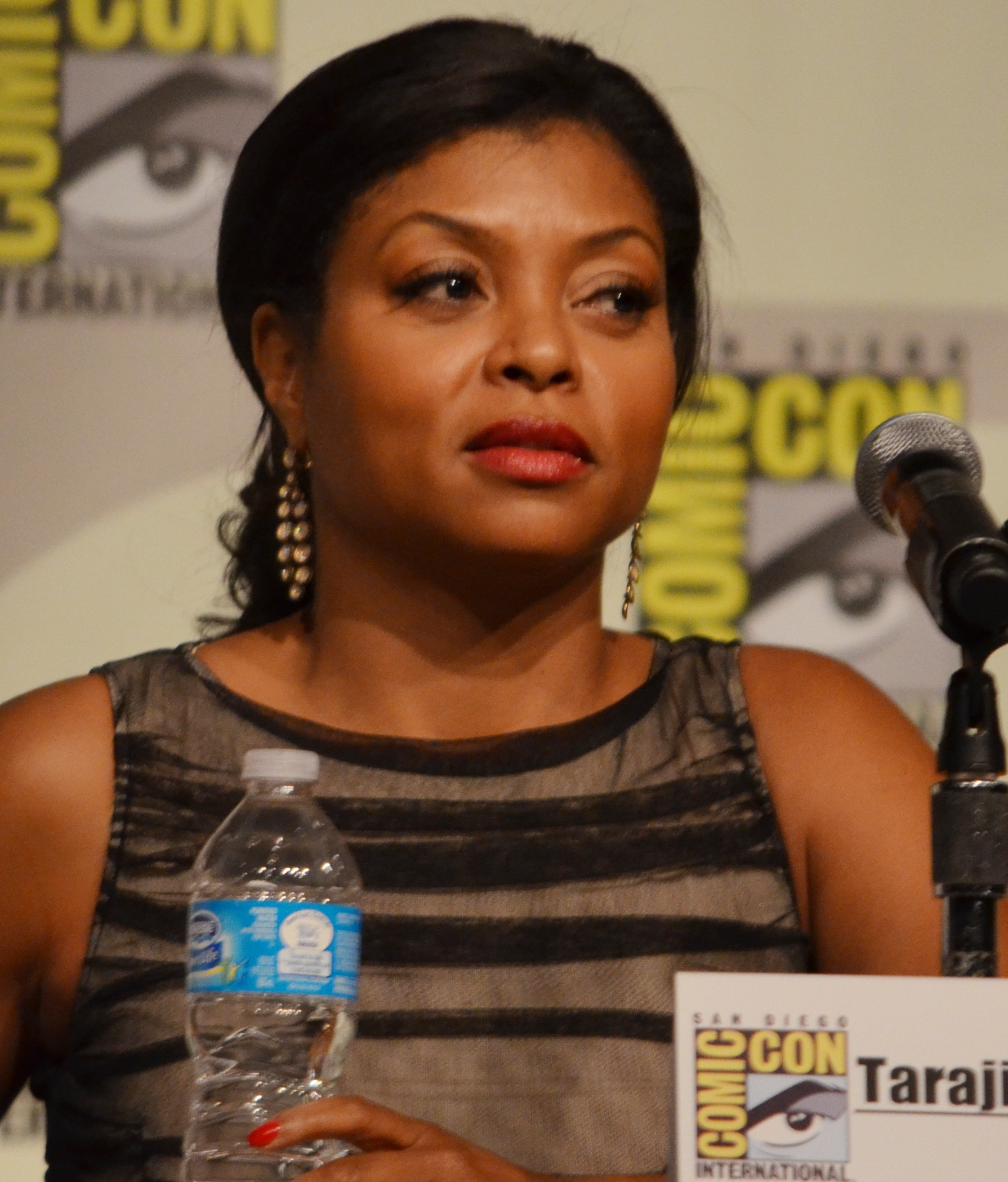
Taraji P. Henson, Best Actress in a Television Series – Drama winner

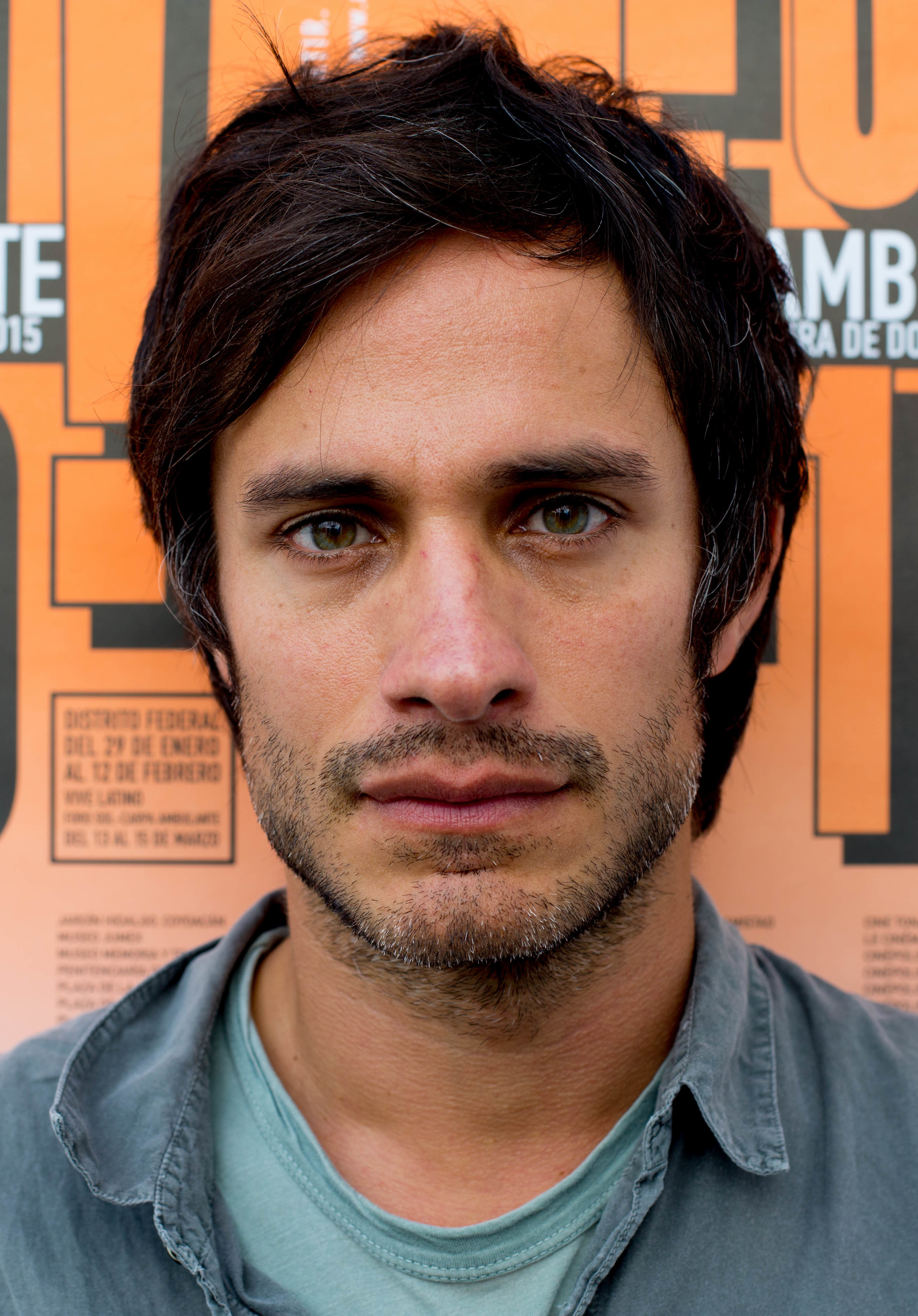
Gael García Bernal, Best Actor in a Television Series – Comedy or Musical winner

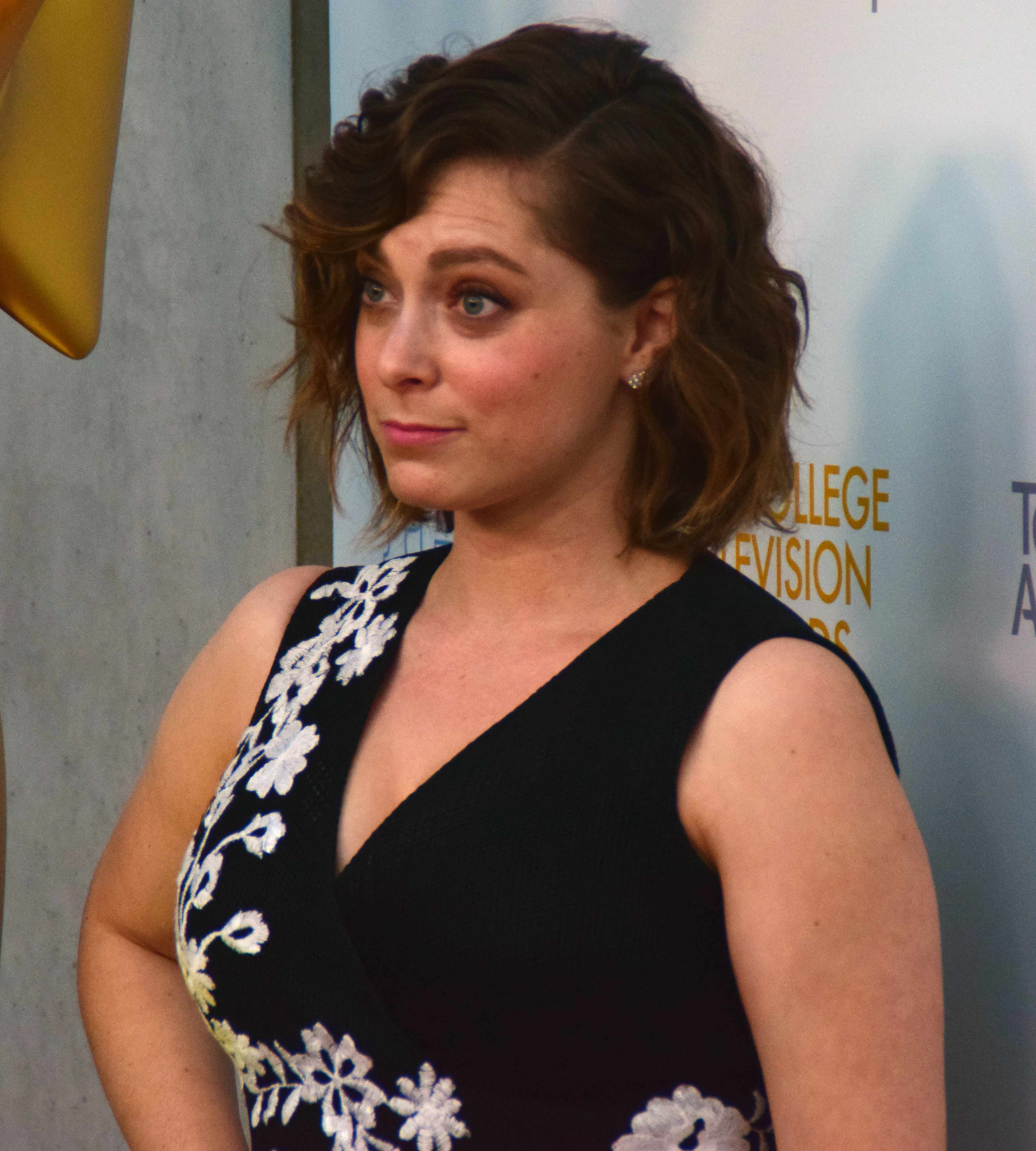
Rachel Bloom, Best Actress in a Television Series – Comedy or Musical winner

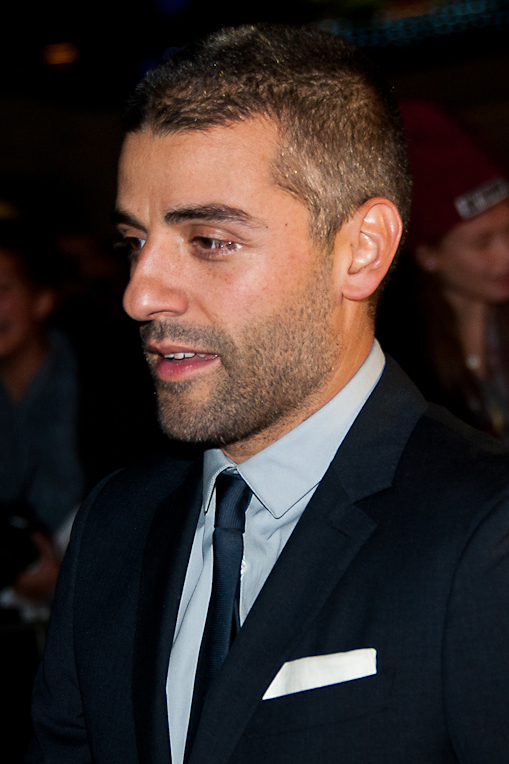
Oscar Isaac, Best Actor in a Miniseries or Television Film winner

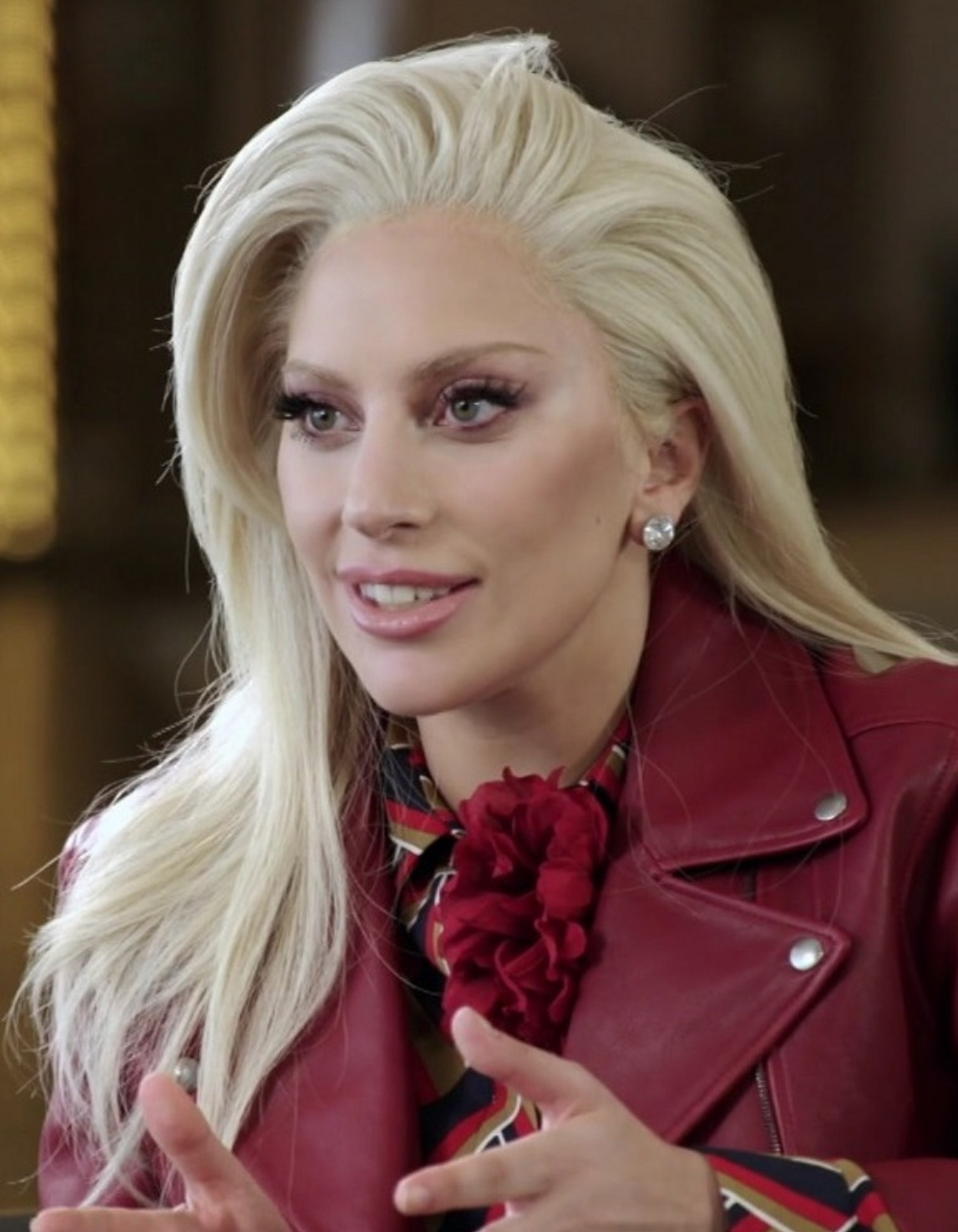
Lady Gaga, Best Actress in a Miniseries or Television Film winner

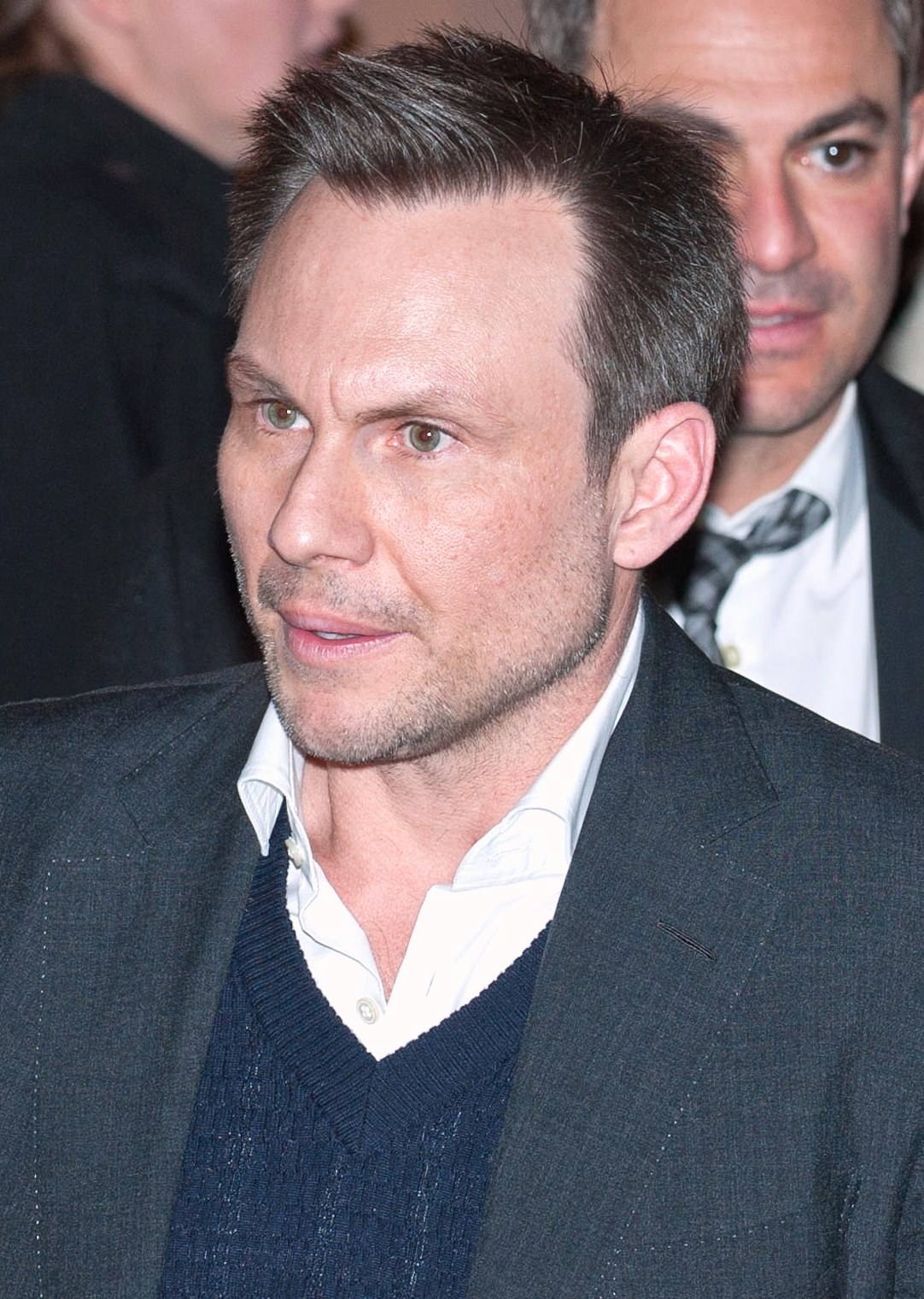
Christian Slater, Best Supporting Actor in a Series, Miniseries, or Television Film winner

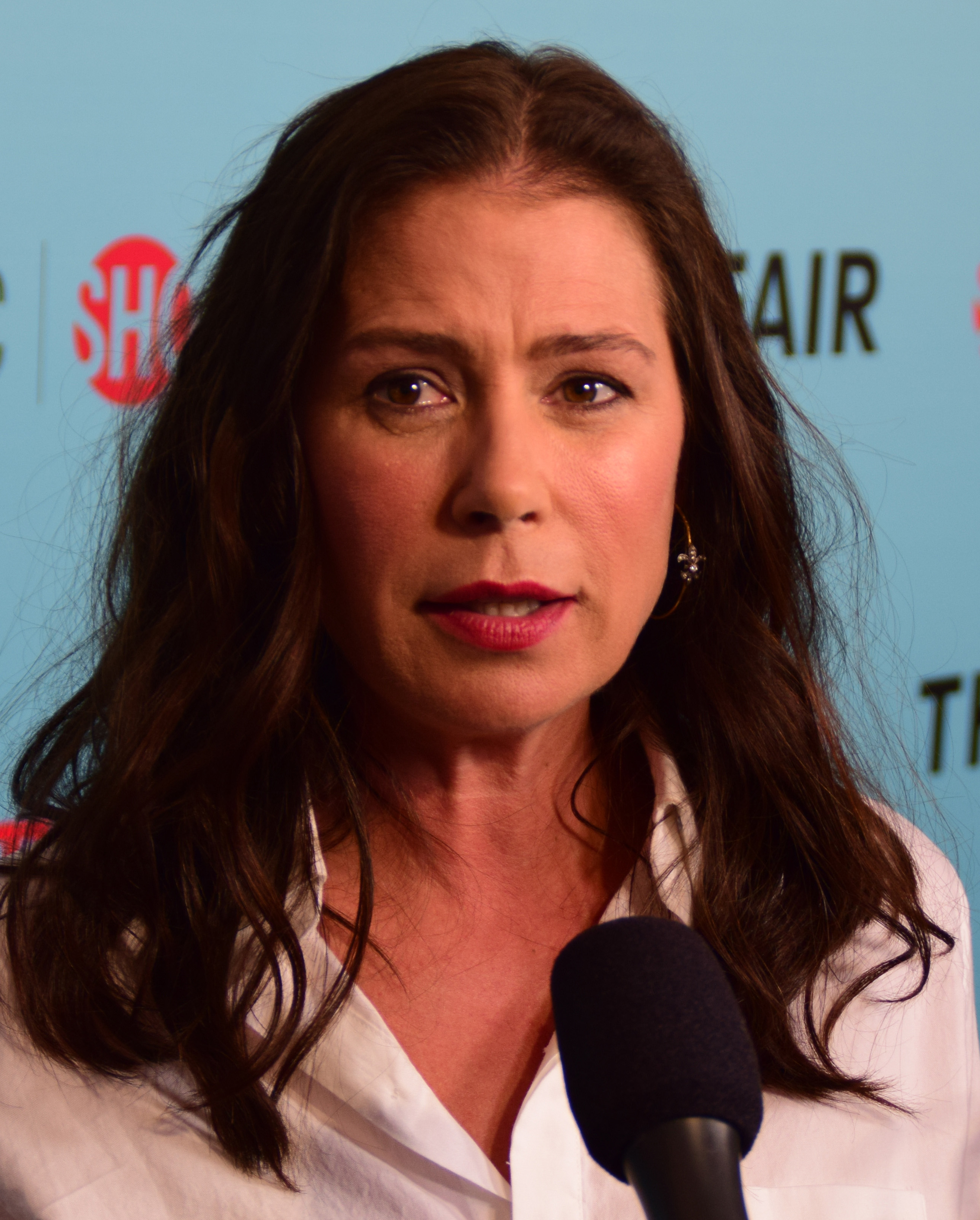
Maura Tierney, Best Supporting Actress in a Series, Miniseries, or Television Film winner

These are the nominees for the 73rd Golden Globe Awards. Winners are listed at the top of each list.

=== Film ===
Best Motion Picture
Drama	Musical or Comedy
The Revenant; Carol; Mad Max: Fury Road; Room; Spotlight	The Martian; The Big Short; Joy; Spy; Trainwreck
Best Performance in a Motion Picture – Drama
Actor	Actress
Leonardo DiCaprio – The Revenant as Hugh Glass; Bryan Cranston – Trumbo as Dalton Trumbo; Michael Fassbender – Steve Jobs as Steve Jobs; Eddie Redmayne – The Danish Girl as Lili Elbe; Will Smith – Concussion as Dr. Bennet Omalu	Brie Larson – Room as Joy "Ma" Newsome; Cate Blanchett – Carol as Carol Aird; Rooney Mara – Carol as Therese Belivet; Saoirse Ronan – Brooklyn as Eilis Lacey; Alicia Vikander – The Danish Girl as Gerda Wegener
Best Performance in a Motion Picture – Musical or Comedy
Actor	Actress
Matt Damon – The Martian as Mark Watney; Christian Bale – The Big Short as Michael Burry; Steve Carell – The Big Short as Mark Baum; Al Pacino – Danny Collins as Danny Collins; Mark Ruffalo – Infinitely Polar Bear as Cam Stuart	Jennifer Lawrence – Joy as Joy Mangano; Melissa McCarthy – Spy as Susan Cooper; Amy Schumer – Trainwreck as Amy Townsend; Maggie Smith – The Lady in the Van as Miss Mary Shepherd / Margaret Fairchild; Lily Tomlin – Grandma as Elle Reid
Best Supporting Performance in a Motion Picture – Drama, Musical or Comedy
Supporting Actor	Supporting Actress
Sylvester Stallone – Creed as Rocky Balboa; Paul Dano – Love & Mercy as Brian Wilson (Young); Idris Elba – Beasts of No Nation as Commandant; Mark Rylance – Bridge of Spies as Rudolf Abel; Michael Shannon – 99 Homes as Rick Carver	Kate Winslet – Steve Jobs as Joanna Hoffman; Jane Fonda – Youth as Brenda Morel; Jennifer Jason Leigh – The Hateful Eight as Daisy Domergue; Helen Mirren – Trumbo as Hedda Hopper; Alicia Vikander – Ex Machina as Ava
Other
Best Director	Best Screenplay
Alejandro G. Iñárritu – The Revenant; Todd Haynes – Carol; Tom McCarthy – Spotlight; George Miller – Mad Max: Fury Road; Ridley Scott – The Martian	Aaron Sorkin – Steve Jobs; Emma Donoghue – Room; Tom McCarthy and Josh Singer – Spotlight; Adam McKay and Charles Randolph – The Big Short; Quentin Tarantino – The Hateful Eight
Best Original Score	Best Original Song
Ennio Morricone – The Hateful Eight; Carter Burwell – Carol; Alexandre Desplat – The Danish Girl; Daniel Pemberton – Steve Jobs; Ryuichi Sakamoto and Alva Noto – The Revenant	"Writing's on the Wall" (Sam Smith and Jimmy Napes) – Spectre; "Love Me like You Do" (Max Martin, Savan Kotecha, Ali Payami, Tove Lo, and Ilya Salmanzadeh) – Fifty Shades of Grey; "One Kind of Love" (Brian Wilson and Scott Bennett) – Love & Mercy; "See You Again" (DJ Frank E, Andrew Cedar, Charlie Puth, and Wiz Khalifa) – Furious 7; "Simple Song #3" (David Lang) – Youth
Best Animated Feature Film	Best Foreign Language Film
Inside Out; Anomalisa; The Good Dinosaur; The Peanuts Movie; Shaun the Sheep Movie	Son of Saul (Hungary); The Brand New Testament (Belgium/France/Luxembourg); The Club (Chile); The Fencer (Finland/Germany/Estonia); Mustang (France)

=== Films with multiple nominations ===
The following 16 films received multiple nominations:

Nominations	Films
5	Carol
4	The Big Short
4	The Revenant
4	Steve Jobs
3	The Danish Girl
3	The Hateful Eight
3	The Martian
3	Room
3	Spotlight
2	Joy
2	Love & Mercy
2	Mad Max: Fury Road
2	Spy
2	Trainwreck
2	Trumbo
2	Youth

=== Films with multiple wins ===
The following 3 films received multiple wins:

Wins	Films
3	The Revenant
2	The Martian
2	Steve Jobs

=== Television ===
Best Series
Drama	Musical or Comedy
Mr. Robot (USA Network); Empire (Fox); Game of Thrones (HBO); Narcos (Netflix); Outlander (Starz)	Mozart in the Jungle (Amazon Prime Video); Casual (Hulu); Orange Is the New Black (Netflix); Silicon Valley (HBO); Transparent (Prime Video); Veep (HBO)
Best Performance in a Television Series – Drama
Actor	Actress
Jon Hamm – Mad Men (AMC) as Don Draper; Rami Malek – Mr. Robot (USA Network) as Elliot Alderson; Wagner Moura – Narcos (Netflix) as Pablo Escobar; Bob Odenkirk – Better Call Saul (AMC) as James "Jimmy" McGill; Liev Schreiber – Ray Donovan (Showtime) as Ray Donovan	Taraji P. Henson – Empire (Fox) as Cookie Lyon; Caitríona Balfe – Outlander (Starz) as Claire Fraser; Viola Davis – How to Get Away with Murder (ABC) as Professor Annalise Keating, J.D.; Eva Green – Penny Dreadful (Showtime) as Vanessa Ives; Robin Wright – House of Cards (Netflix) as Claire Underwood
Best Performance in a Television Series – Musical or Comedy
Actor	Actress
Gael García Bernal – Mozart in the Jungle (Prime Video) as Rodrigo De Souza; Aziz Ansari – Master of None (Netflix) as Dev Shah; Rob Lowe – The Grinder (Fox) as Dean Sanderson, Jr.; Patrick Stewart – Blunt Talk (Starz) as Walter Blunt; Jeffrey Tambor – Transparent (Prime Video) as Maura Pfefferman	Rachel Bloom – Crazy Ex-Girlfriend (The CW) as Rebecca Bunch; Jamie Lee Curtis – Scream Queens (Fox) as Dean Cathy Munsch; Julia Louis-Dreyfus – Veep (HBO) as President Selina Meyer; Gina Rodriguez – Jane the Virgin (The CW) as Jane Gloriana Villanueva; Lily Tomlin – Grace and Frankie (Netflix) as Frankie Bergstein
Best Performance in a Miniseries or Television Film
Actor	Actress
Oscar Isaac – Show Me a Hero (HBO) as Mayor Nick Wasicsko; Idris Elba – Luther (BBC America) as John Luther; David Oyelowo – Nightingale (HBO) as Peter Snowden; Mark Rylance – Wolf Hall (PBS) as Thomas Cromwell; Patrick Wilson – Fargo (FX) as State Trooper Lou Solverson	Lady Gaga – American Horror Story: Hotel (FX) as Elizabeth Johnson / The Countess; Kirsten Dunst – Fargo (FX) as Peggy Blumquist; Sarah Hay – Flesh and Bone (Starz) as Claire Robbins; Felicity Huffman – American Crime (ABC) as Barbara "Barb" Hanlon; Queen Latifah – Bessie (HBO) as Bessie Smith
Best Supporting Performance in a Series, Miniseries or Television Film
Supporting Actor	Supporting Actress
Christian Slater – Mr. Robot (USA Network) as Mr. Robot / Edward Alderson; Alan Cumming – The Good Wife (CBS) as Eli Gold; Damian Lewis – Wolf Hall (PBS) as King Henry VIII; Ben Mendelsohn – Bloodline (Netflix) as Danny Rayburn; Tobias Menzies – Outlander (Starz) as Frank Randall / Jonathan "Black Jack" Randall	Maura Tierney – The Affair (Showtime) as Helen Solloway; Uzo Aduba – Orange Is the New Black (Netflix) as Suzanne "Crazy Eyes" Warren; Joanne Froggatt – Downton Abbey (PBS) as Anna Bates; Regina King – American Crime (ABC) as Aliyah Shadeed; Judith Light – Transparent (Prime Video) as Shelly Pfefferman
Best Miniseries or Television Film
Wolf Hall (PBS); American Crime (ABC); American Horror Story: Hotel (FX); Fargo (FX); Flesh and Bone (Starz)

=== Series with multiple nominations ===
The following 13 series received multiple nominations:

Nominations	Series
3	American Crime
3	Fargo
3	Mr. Robot
3	Outlander
3	Transparent
3	Wolf Hall
2	American Horror Story: Hotel
2	Empire
2	Flesh & Bone
2	Mozart in the Jungle
2	Narcos
2	Orange Is the New Black
2	Veep

=== Series with multiple wins ===
The following 2 series received multiple wins:

Wins	Series
2	Mozart in the Jungle
2	Mr. Robot

== Presenters ==
The Hollywood Foreign Press announced the following presenters:

- Amy Adams with Best Actor in a Motion Picture – Musical or Comedy
- Jaimie Alexander and Amber Heard with Best Actor – Miniseries or Television Film
- Patricia Arquette and J. K. Simmons with Best Supporting Actor – Motion Picture
- Jennifer Lawrence and Amy Schumer introduced Joy and Trainwreck
- Melissa Benoist and Grant Gustin with Best Actor in a Television Series – Comedy or Musical
- Orlando Bloom and Bryce Dallas Howard with Best Miniseries or Television Film
- Kate Bosworth and Sophia Bush with Best Actress in a Television Series – Drama
- Gerard Butler and Helen Mirren with Best Foreign Language Film
- Jim Carrey with Best Motion Picture – Musical or Comedy
- Matt Damon introduced The Martian
- Viola Davis introduced Carol
- Chris Evans introduced Spotlight
- Paul Feig, Melissa McCarthy, and Jason Statham introduced Spy
- Will Ferrell and Mark Wahlberg with Best Screenplay
- America Ferrera and Eva Longoria with Best Actor in a Television Series – Drama
- Harrison Ford with Best Motion Picture – Drama
- Tom Ford and Lady Gaga with Best Supporting Actor – Series, Miniseries or Television Film
- Jamie Foxx and Lily James with intro of Miss Golden Globe and Best Original Score
- Morgan Freeman with Best Director – Motion Picture
- Mel Gibson introduced Mad Max: Fury Road
- Ryan Gosling and Brad Pitt introduced The Big Short
- Maggie Gyllenhaal introduced Room
- Tom Hanks with Cecil B. DeMille Award
- Kevin Hart and Ken Jeong with Best Actress – Miniseries or Television Film
- Taraji P. Henson and Terrence Howard with Best Television Series – Comedy or Musical
- Jonah Hill and Channing Tatum with Best Supporting Actress – Motion Picture
- Kate Hudson and Kurt Russell with Best Animated Feature Film
- Dwayne Johnson and Jennifer Lopez with Best Supporting Actress – Series, Miniseries or Television Film
- Michael Keaton with Best Actress in a Motion Picture – Musical or Comedy
- John Krasinski and Olivia Wilde with Best Television Series – Drama
- Tobey Maguire introduced The Revenant
- Julianne Moore with Best Actor in a Motion Picture – Drama
- Katy Perry with Best Original Song
- Eddie Redmayne with Best Actress in a Motion Picture – Drama
- Andy Samberg with Best Actor in a Television Series – Comedy or Musical

== Reception ==
The show received mixed to negative reviews, with the critics panning host Ricky Gervais's jokes as well as lack of energy in ceremony. Writing for The Washington Post, Hank Stuever heavily criticised the ceremony saying, "We ask for the worst, so we get the worst", and went on to say "Gervais acted like he was the one being made to suffer, but truly this misery is shared all around." Daniel D'Addario of Time's also felt that the show was a "bore" and said, "By the Globes' own standard, this year's show felt unbearably bogged down." However, The New York Times' James Poniewozik reviewed the ceremony moderately saying: "A well-run, fun Globes — privileged people toasting their terrific success with bottomless Moët — is its own corrective to Hollywood self-seriousness. Whereas the planned transgression of this one was less a stiff shot than small beer." The ceremony was nominated for the Writers Guild of America Award for Best Comedy/Variety (Music, Awards, Tributes) – Specials, but lost out to Triumph's Election Special 2016.

=== Ratings ===
The ceremony averaged a Nielsen 5.5 ratings/13 share, and was watched by 18.5 million viewers. The ratings was an eleven percent decline from the previous ceremony's viewership of 19.3 million, the second highest in a decade.

== See also ==
- 21st Critics' Choice Awards
- 22nd Screen Actors Guild Awards
- 36th Golden Raspberry Awards
- 69th British Academy Film Awards
- 88th Academy Awards
