= Chris Watson (singer) =

British tenor

Christopher Watson is a British tenor specialising in Early music, Baroque, and Contemporary repertoire.

Born in Leamington Spa on 10 January 1969, and raised in Canterbury, Kent in England, Watson studied tuba before reading music at the University of Exeter. Having sung in and directed Exeter University Chapel Choir, and a spell as a choral scholar at Exeter Cathedral, he went on to hold positions as lay clerk at Durham Cathedral, Christ Church Cathedral, Oxford, and Westminster Cathedral.

== Career ==
Watson became Director of Music of the Choir of Trinity College, University of Melbourne in January 2017. Prior to this, while based in Europe, he sang as a soloist and as a consort singer with The Tallis Scholars, with whom he made over 500 appearances, and with Alamire, Gallicantus and Collegium Vocale Gent. He also performed regularly with Tenebrae and Theatre of Voices, among others. His conducting work included the Oxford-based chamber choir Sospiri, the chapel choir of St Edmund Hall, Oxford.

== Music ==
In concert he has performed, among others, the role of the Evangelist in the settings of The Passion by J.S. Bach, most recently at Christ Church Oxford, Durham, Canterbury and Manchester Cathedrals, as well as the Christmas Oratorio and the Mass in B Minor. He has presented the World Premières of David Lang’s Pulitzer-winning Little Match Girl Passion at Carnegie Hall, and The Stones of the Arch by Gavin Bryars with the Kronos Quartet. With Theatre of Voices he has given performances of Stockhausen’s Stimmung, and with them has recorded Luciano Berio’s A Ronne and Arvo Pärt’s Stabat Mater. As a recitalist, he has also performed 20th Century Art song, including songs by Herbert Howells, Gerald Finzi and Peter Warlock.

== Discography ==
His discography includes, for Harmonia Mundi, Arvo Pärt's Creator Spiritus and a Grammy-winning recording of David Lang’s Little Match Girl Passion with Paul Hillier and Theatre of Voices. For Gimell he has recorded Palestrina's Missa Papae Marcelli and Victoria's Lamentations of Jeremiah with The Tallis Scholars.
