= Houston Film Critics Society Awards 2015 =

Annual film awards

9th Houston Film Critics Society Awards
- Date: January 9, 2016
- Location: Sundance Cinemas Houston; Houston, Texas
- Country: United States
- Presented by: Houston Film Critics Society
- Website: houstonfilmcritics.com/awards

The 9th Houston Film Critics Society Awards nominations were announced on December 13, 2015. The 2015 awards were given out at a ceremony held at Sundance Cinemas Houston on January 9, 2016. The awards are presented annually by the Houston Film Critics Society based in Houston, Texas.

== Winners and nominees ==
Winners are listed first and highlighted with boldface.

Best Picture	Best Foreign Language Film
**Spotlight**; The Big Short; Ex Machina; Inside Out; Mad Max: Fury Road; The Martian; The Revenant; Room; Sicario; Steve Jobs	**Son of Saul** • Hungary; The Assassin • Taiwan; Goodnight Mommy • Austria; The Tribe • Ukraine; White God • Hungary
Best Actor	Best Actress
**Michael Fassbender – Steve Jobs**; Bryan Cranston – Trumbo; Matt Damon – The Martian; Leonardo DiCaprio – The Revenant; Tom Hardy – Legend	**Brie Larson – Room**; Cate Blanchett – Carol; Emily Blunt – Sicario; Saoirse Ronan – Brooklyn; Charlize Theron – Mad Max: Fury Road
Best Supporting Actor	Best Supporting Actress
**Tom Hardy – The Revenant**; Mark Ruffalo – Spotlight; Mark Rylance – Bridge of Spies; Michael Shannon – 99 Homes; Sylvester Stallone – Creed	**Rooney Mara – Carol**; Jennifer Jason Leigh – The Hateful Eight; Alicia Vikander – The Danish Girl; Alicia Vikander – Ex Machina; Kate Winslet – Steve Jobs
Best Director	Best Cinematography
**Alejandro G. Iñárritu – The Revenant**; Lenny Abrahamson – Room; Tom McCarthy – Spotlight; George Miller – Mad Max: Fury Road; Ridley Scott – The Martian	**The Revenant – Emmanuel Lubezki**; Sicario – Roger Deakins; The Hateful Eight – Robert Richardson; Mad Max: Fury Road – John Seale; The Martian – Dariusz Wolski
Best Animated Feature Film	Best Documentary Feature
**Inside Out**; Anomalisa; The Good Dinosaur; The Peanuts Movie; Shaun the Sheep Movie	**Amy**; Best of Enemies; Cartel Land; The Look of Silence; Where to Invade Next
Best Original Score	Best Original Song
**The Hateful Eight – Ennio Morricone**; Inside Out – Michael Giacchino; Mad Max: Fury Road – Junkie XL; Steve Jobs – Daniel Pemberton; The Revenant – Ryuichi Sakamoto, Alva Noto, and Bryce Dessner	**"One Kind of Love" by Scott Bennett and Brian Wilson – Love & Mercy**; "Love Me like You Do" by Savan Kotecha, Tove Lo, Max Martin, Ali Payami and Ilya Salmanzadeh – Fifty Shades of Grey; "See You Again" by Andrew Cedar, DJ Frank E, Wiz Khalifa and Charlie Puth – Furious 7; "Simple Song Number 3" by David Lang – Youth; "Writing's on the Wall" by Jimmy Napes and Sam Smith – Spectre
Best Screenplay	Best Poster
**Spotlight – Tom McCarthy and Josh Singer**; Room – Emma Donoghue; The Martian – Drew Goddard; Steve Jobs – Aaron Sorkin; The Hateful Eight – Quentin Tarantino	**Mad Max: Fury Road ('What a Lovely Day' alternate)**: Carol; Ex Machina; It Follows (rear window alternate); Sicario; The Walk (IMAX alternate)
Texas Independent Film Award	Technical Achievement
**The Last Man on the Moon**; 6 Years; 7 Chinese Brothers; Results; Sir Doug and the Genuine Texas Cosmic Groove	**Mad Max: Fury Road**
Worst Film
**Pixels**; Aloha; The Boy Next Door; Fantastic Four; Mortdecai

== Movies with multiple nominations and awards ==
The following films received multiple nominations:

Nominations	Film
7	Mad Max: Fury Road
6	The Martian
6	The Revenant
5	Steve Jobs
4	The Hateful Eight
4	Room
4	Sicario
4	Spotlight
3	Carol
3	Ex Machina
3	Inside Out

The following films received multiple awards:

Wins	Film
3	The Revenant
2	Mad Max: Fury Road
2	Spotlight
