= Siola d'oro =

Biennial opera prize

The Siola d'oro ("Golden Swallow") is a biennial opera prize awarded in Gatteo since 1983, in memory of Lina Pagliughi.

The award has been given to: Luciana Serra, June Anderson, Mariella Devia, Denia Mazzola, Enedina Lloris, Sumi Jo, Valeria Esposito, Patrizia Ciofi (1997), Jessica Pratt, Elizabeth Vidal, Stefania Bonfadelli, Annick Massis, Elena Mosuc, Pretty Yende.
