= Donald Martin Jenni =

American classical composer

Donald Martin Jenni (born Milwaukee, October 4, 1937 – died New Orleans June 21, 2006) was an American composer, musicologist, and educator. A piano and composition prodigy, Jenni began weekend studies with composer Leon Stein in 1950, and published several compositions before graduating from high school in 1954; he was "championed" during his teen years by composer Henry Cowell.

In 1954, he began his undergraduate education at De Paul University in Chicago, earning a bachelor's degree in music; he was also choirmaster at St. Patrick's Church in South Chicago, Chicago from 1955-60. He earned a master's degree in Medieval Studies from the University of Chicago in 1962 and a doctorate in music composition from Stanford University in 1966.

He taught at De Paul University Chicago from 1962–68, then joined the faculty in music composition and theory at the University of Iowa from 1968. He was tenured in 1974, and served as head of Iowa's composition and theory areas from 1990-1997. Among his students at Iowa were James Romig, Heinrich Taube, and David Lang. Lang first studied with Jenni in a Stanford course surveying French music from Charlemagne to Pierre Boulez; Lang writes, "I had no interest in this music, I thought," and he took the course reluctantly, but found that "the level of erudition was something I had never experienced before. Jenni’s deep knowledge of the music and the history behind the music was mindblowingly persuasive. Most of all, his ability to subject even the most seemingly obvious musical materials to a laser-like microscopic analysis was miraculous. It was by far the best course I had as an undergraduate"; Lang then "decided to follow Jenni to the University of Iowa" for his master's degree.

Jenni "had knowledge of a dozen" languages, and was fluent in many of them, including French, German, Swiss, Danish, Slovak, and Hungarian. His scholarly research was also wide-ranging, including South Indian classical music, secular and Gregorian medieval music, and Western monasticism - including a translation of the homilies of the 13th-century abbot Ogier of Locedio.

In 1996, Jenni became a claustral oblate of the Benedictine monastery of Christ in the Desert in Chama, New Mexico, and the legal guardian of a boy from Gambia whom he had sponsored through the Christian Children's Fund. In 1999, when his foster son completed high school and enrolled in college, Jenni retired from Iowa and moved to Chama to become the monastery's choirmaster. In 2002, he moved to New Orleans, where his foster son was working; in 2004 his foster son married; and in 2006, he died of cancer.

== Compositions ==
- 1957-58 Ecce sacerdos magnus
- 1960 Elegy & Dance, Cantata anglica, Early Spring
- 1961 Divertimento, Hannibal of Carthage, Ad te levavi, In Memoriam 1959 [François de France]
- 1962 In Memoriam Fratris Catulli
- 1963 A Game of Dates.
- 1964 Four Play, The Emperor Clothed Anew, String Quartet ‘Weschler’.
- 1965 Inventio super nomen, Death be not Proud. Glora
- 1966 Le Kaleidoscope de Gide, Suite on sweet reencountering, Musica per flauto e clavicembalo
- 1967 Musique printanière, Graduals & Alleluias
- 1968 Axis, Mond/monde
- 1968 Tympanorum musices
- 1969 R-Music Asphodel, Cucumber Music
- 1971 Eulalia's Rounds
- 1973 Chopiniana
- 1974 Musica della primavera, Musica dell’estate, Music for Friends No.2
- 1975 Cherry Valley, Nightbay, Get Hence Foule Griefe, Verbum supernum, Musica dell’autunno
- 1975-81 Ice (in several performed versions)
- 1976 Allegro estatico, Musica dell’inverno, Long Hill May, Airs & Seasons for the Clarinet, Geistliche Veränderungen
- 1978 Crux Christi ave, Reconnaissance aux Maitres
- 1979 Canticum beatæ Virginis, Liquor Store Haiku
- 1980 Pharos, Organum septuplum
- 1981 Ballfall, Five Songs from The Country of Marriage
- 1982 Moisson d’œufs, On the Endurance of Man, In Memoriam Humphrey Searle, Enys Rock 2
- 1983 Mordros
- 1984 Sestina Variations
- 1985 Sam mbira
- 1986 This is the Year!
- 1987 Romanza, Tutti per Verdi
- 1988 Pidipadam, The Menæchmi
- 1989 Gales
- 1990 Per Elysios, (~1999) Liturgical Cycle A.
- 1993 Vespers of Christ the King, Figura circulorum
- 1994 Canto, The Opalion
- 1995 Tio's Foursome
- 1998 Jusqu’à la liesse
- 2001 Variazioni sopra Crux fidelis
