= Youth (2015 film) =

Film by Paolo Sorrentino

- Theatrical release poster
- Italian: Youth – La giovinezza
- Directed by: Paolo Sorrentino
- Written by: Paolo Sorrentino
- Produced by: Nicola Giuliano; Francesca Cima; Carlotta Calori
- Starring: Michael Caine; Harvey Keitel; Rachel Weisz; Paul Dano; Jane Fonda
- Cinematography: Luca Bigazzi
- Edited by: Cristiano Travaglioli
- Music by: David Lang
- Production companies: Indigo Film; Barbary Films; Pathé; France 2 Cinéma; Number 9 Films; C-Films
- Distributed by: Medusa Film (Italy); Pathé Distribution (France); StudioCanal (United Kingdom); Praesens-Film (Switzerland)
- Release dates: 20 May 2015 (Cannes); 20 May 2015 (Italy); 28 May 2015 (Switzerland); 9 September 2015 (France); 29 January 2016 (United Kingdom)
- Running time: 124 minutes
- Countries: Italy; France; United Kingdom; Switzerland
- Language: English
- Budget: €12.8 million; ($14.4 million)
- Box office: $24 million

Youth (Italian: Youth – La giovinezza) is a 2015 comedy-drama film written and directed by Paolo Sorrentino. It stars Michael Caine and Harvey Keitel as best friends who reflect on their lives while holidaying in the Swiss Alps. The story depicts the struggle between age and youth, the past and the future, life and death, and commitment and betrayal. The cast also includes Rachel Weisz, Paul Dano, and Jane Fonda.

The film premiered at the 2015 Cannes Film Festival, where it competed for the Palme d'Or and had a positive critical response. At the 28th European Film Awards, Youth won Best Film, Best Director for Sorrentino, and Best Actor for Caine. It received an Academy Award nomination for Best Original Song, for David Lang's composition of "Simple Song #3". At the Golden Globe Awards, Lang was also nominated along with Fonda for Best Supporting Actress.

== Plot ==
Septuagenarian best friends Fred Ballinger and Mick Boyle are on vacation in the Swiss Alps, staying at a luxury spa/resort in Flims. Fred is a retired composer of classical music; at the hotel, he is approached by an emissary for Queen Elizabeth II, conferring a knighthood and asking him to perform his popular piece "Simple Song #3" at Prince Philip's birthday concert. Fred turns down the offer, claiming he is no longer interested in performing—although he still composes pieces in his head when alone. Mick is a film director, and is working with a group of writers to develop the screenplay for his latest film, which he calls his "testament". Also with them is actor Jimmy Tree, who is researching for an upcoming role and frustrated that he is only remembered for his role as a robot. The hotel is inhabited by other quirky individuals, including a young masseuse, an overweight Diego Maradona, and Miss Universe.

Fred and Mick reflect on their lives, admitting that their memories are fading and that they see little in their futures. Fred's daughter and assistant, Lena, is married to Mick's son, but the latter leaves her for pop star Paloma Faith. Lena stays at the resort and vents her anger at her father, who was always distant as she grew up. The emissary returns, and Lena cries as Fred explains that he will not perform "Simple Song #3" because the soprano part belongs only to his wife and she can no longer sing.

Mick completes his screenplay and is satisfied with it. The main role is written for aging diva Brenda Morel, who has starred in eleven of his previous films. Brenda surprises Mick by arriving at the resort, and telling him that she is taking a television role instead; she declares that cinema is the past and that Mick has not made a good film in years. Disheartened, Mick commits suicide by jumping from a balcony in front of Fred. Fred decides to visit his wife for the first time in years. She is senile, and living at a care home in Venice. He then returns to the UK to conduct "Simple Song #3" in front of the Queen and Prince.

Interspersed throughout the film are surreal sequences, including a levitating monk, an imagined Paloma Faith music video, Jimmy dressed as Adolf Hitler, Fred conducting a field of cowbells, and Mick envisioning all his previous leading ladies on a mountaintop (including Brenda, in her new unglamorous TV role).

== Cast ==
- Michael Caine as Fred Ballinger
- Harvey Keitel as Mick Boyle
- Rachel Weisz as Lena Ballinger
- Paul Dano as Jimmy Tree
- Mark Kozelek as himself
- Robert Seethaler as Luca Moroder
- Alex Macqueen as Queen's emissary
- Luna Mijović as masseuse
- Tom Lipinski as screenwriter in love
- Chloe Pirrie as girl screenwriter
- Alex Beckett as bearded screenwriter
- Nate Dern as funny screenwriter
- Mark Gessner as shy screenwriter
- Paloma Faith as herself
- Ed Stoppard as Julian Boyle
- Mădălina Ghenea as Miss Universe Joyce Owens
- Jane Fonda as Brenda Morel
- Ian Keir Attard as Queen's emissary assistant
- Roly Serrano as Diego Maradona
- Viktoria Mullova as herself
- Sumi Jo as herself

== Production ==
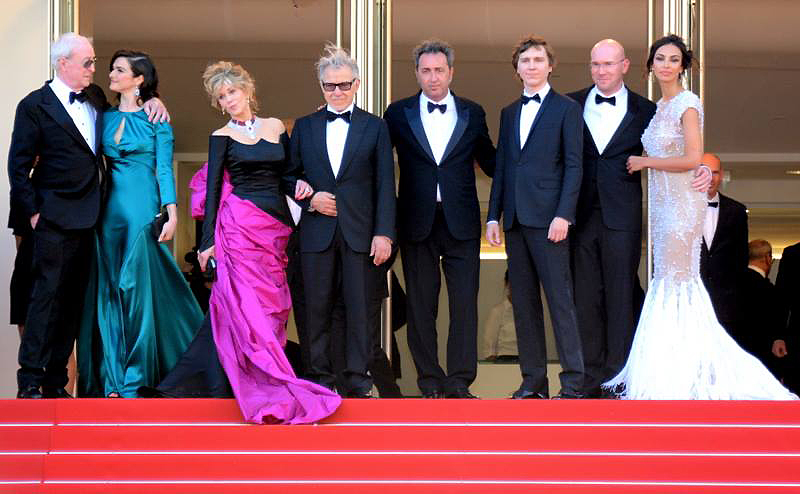
Director and stars at the 2015 Cannes Film Festival

Youth is Sorrentino's second English-language film and the follow-up to his Academy Award-winning film The Great Beauty (2013). Principal photography began in Flims, Switzerland, in May 2014. The primary location was the Waldhaus Flims, a five-star hotel built in the 19th century, where the cast and crew all stayed while filming. Other scenes were filmed in Davos, Switzerland, particularly in the Hotel Schatzalp (the location of Thomas Mann's The Magic Mountain). Some filming was also done in Rome and Venice.

Sorrentino's regular cinematographer Luca Bigazzi returned to photograph the film. David Lang contributed in composing the film's music, including the piece "Simple Song #3" that is fictionally performed for Queen Elizabeth at the end. The scene was shot with soprano Sumi Jo, violinist Viktoria Mullova, the BBC Concert Orchestra, and the Berlin Radio Choir.

Michael Caine was coached for the role as conductor by the Italian composer and conductor Dimitri Scarlato.

== Soundtrack ==
The soundtrack for Youth was released by Milan Records in December 2015. Among various songs, the soundtrack also includes the opening track of the film "You Got the Love" performed by the Retrosettes, "Simple Song #3" composed by David Lang, as well as "Just (After Song of Songs)", also composed by David Lang.

== Release ==
Youth premiered on 20 May 2015 at the Cannes Film Festival, where it competed for the Palme d'Or, and was released theatrically in Italy by Medusa Film on the same day. The film was also selected for the Special Presentations section of the 2015 Toronto International Film Festival.

In Switzerland, Youth was released by Praesens-Film in the Italian-speaking region on 28 May 2015, in the French-speaking region on 9 September and in the German-speaking region on 10 September. The film was released theatrically in France on 9 September 2015 by Pathé Distribution and in the United Kingdom on 29 January 2016 by StudioCanal. It was released in select theaters in the United States on 4 December 2015 by Fox Searchlight. By the end of its box office run, Youth had earned $24 million worldwide.

=== Home media ===
Youth was released on DVD and Blu-ray in the United States on 1 March 2016.

== Reception ==
=== Critical response ===
Youth received positive reviews. On the review aggregator website Rotten Tomatoes, the film holds an approval rating of 72% based on 213 reviews, with an average rating of 7.1/10. The website's critics consensus reads, "Gorgeously filmed and beautifully acted, Youth offers an enticing – albeit flawed – opportunity to witness an impressive array of seasoned veterans combining their cinematic might." On Metacritic, which assigns a weighted average score out of 100 to reviews from mainstream critics, the film received an average score of 64, based on reviews from 41 critics, indicating "generally favorable" reviews.

Kenneth Turan of the Los Angeles Times wrote, "Youth is a film that goes its own way. Quixotic, idiosyncratic, effortlessly moving, it's as much a cinematic essay as anything else, a meditation on the wonders and complications of life, an examination of what lasts, of what matters to people no matter their age." Todd McCarthy of The Hollywood Reporter called the film "a voluptuary's feast, a full-body immersion in the sensory pleasures of the cinema", and praised Caine and Keitel's performances. Jay Weissberg of Variety described it as Sorrentino's "most tender film to date, an emotionally rich contemplation of life's wisdom gained, lost, and remembered". In more mixed reviews, Robbie Collin of The Daily Telegraph described the film as "gorgeous but chilly" and said it "never grasps its central theme", while Peter Bradshaw of The Guardian said it "has a wan eloquence and elegance, though freighted with sentimentality and a strangely unearned and uninteresting macho-geriatric regret for lost time."

=== Accolades ===
Award	Category	Recipient	Result	Ref(s)
Academy Awards	Best Original Song	David Lang	Nominated	
Alliance of Women Film Journalists	Best Film Music or Score	David Lang	Nominated	
Cannes Film Festival	Palme D'Or	Paolo Sorrentino	Nominated	
Costume Designers Guild Awards	Excellence in Contemporary Film	Carlo Poggioli	Nominated	
César Awards	Best Foreign Film	Paolo Sorrentino	Nominated	
Critics' Choice Awards	Best Original Song	David Lang	Nominated	
Detroit Film Critics Society	Best Film	Paolo Sorrentino	Nominated	
Detroit Film Critics Society	Best Director	Paolo Sorrentino	Nominated	
Detroit Film Critics Society	Best Actor	Michael Caine	Won	
European Film Awards	Best Film	Paolo Sorrentino	Won	
European Film Awards	Best Director	Paolo Sorrentino	Won	
European Film Awards	Best Screenwriter	Paolo Sorrentino	Nominated	
European Film Awards	Best Actor	Michael Caine	Won	
European Film Awards	Best Actress	Rachel Weisz	Nominated	
Florida Film Critics Circle Awards	Best Cinematography	Luca Bigazzi	Nominated	
Golden Globe Awards	Best Original Song	David Lang	Nominated	
Golden Globe Awards	Best Supporting Actress – Motion Picture	Jane Fonda	Nominated	
Hawaii International Film Festival	EuroCinema Hawai'i Award	Paolo Sorrentino	Nominated	
Hollywood Film Awards	Best Supporting Actress	Jane Fonda	Won	
Houston Film Critics Society Awards	Best Original Song	David Lang	Nominated	
Karlovy Vary International Film Festival	Audience Award	Paolo Sorrentino	Won	
London Film Critics Circle Awards	Best British/Irish Actor	Michael Caine	Nominated	
Make-Up Artists and Hair Stylists Guild Awards	Best Contemporary Makeup – Feature Motion Picture	Maurizio Silvi, Matteo Silvi	Nominated	
Nastro d'Argento	Best Director	Paolo Sorrentino	Won	
Nastro d'Argento	Best Producer	Nicola Giuliano, Francesca Cima, Carlotta Calori	Nominated	
Nastro d'Argento	Best Script	Paolo Sorrentino	Nominated	
Nastro d'Argento	Best Cinematography	Luca Bigazzi	Won	
Nastro d'Argento	Best Editing	Cristiano Travaglioli	Won	
Nastro d'Argento	Best Production Design	Ludovica Ferrario	Nominated	
Nastro d'Argento	Best Costume Design	Carlo Poggioli	Nominated	
Nastro d'Argento	Best Casting Director	Anna Maria Sambucco	Nominated	
Ostend Film Festival	Look Prize	Paolo Sorrentino	Nominated	
Satellite Awards	Best Supporting Actress	Jane Fonda	Nominated	
