= The Little Match Girl Passion =

Musical composition by David Lang

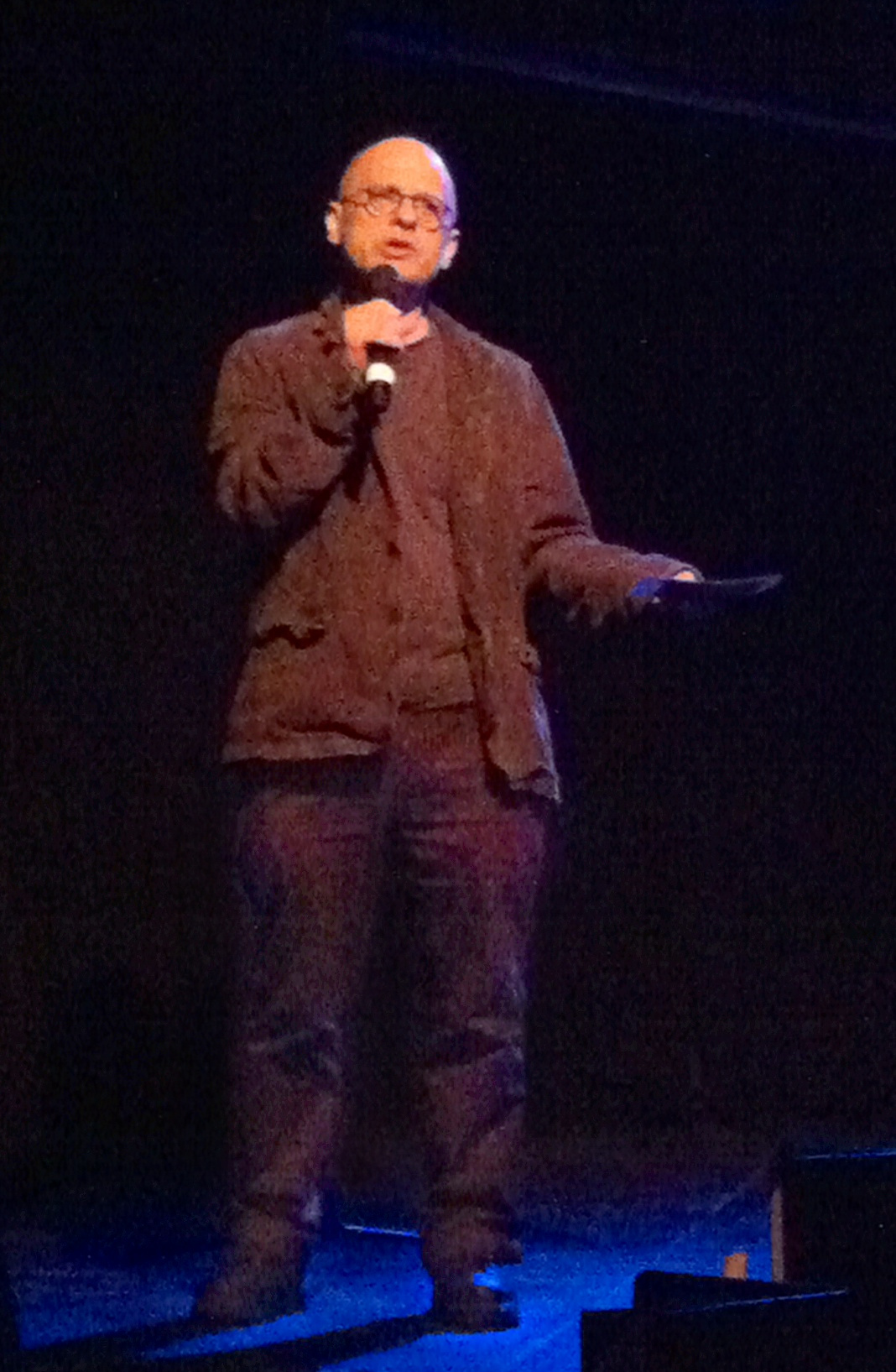
David Lang in 2012

The Little Match Girl Passion is a choral work by David Lang, based on the 1845 Hans Christian Andersen story, "The Little Match Girl". It is influenced by Johann Sebastian Bach’s St Matthew Passion (1727) and won the Pulitzer Prize for Music in 2008.

The first performance was given at Carnegie Hall on 27 October 2007 with the Theatre of Voices (Miriam Andersén, Bente Vist, Jakob Bloch Jespersen and Christopher Watson), conducted by Paul Hillier. It is scored for chamber choir and four solo singers (SATB) who also play simple percussion. A recording was issued by French record label Harmonia Mundi in August 2009. It subsequently won a Grammy in 2010, in the category 'Best Small Ensemble Performance'.

== Program note ==
In his program note, David Lang writes:

What drew me to The Little Match Girl is that the strength of the story lies not in its plot but in the fact that all its parts—the horror and the beauty—are constantly suffused with their opposites. The girl's bitter present is locked together with the sweetness of her past memories; her poverty is always suffused with her hopefulness. There is a kind of naive equilibrium between suffering and hope .... My piece is called "The Little Match Girl Passion" and it sets Hans Christian Andersen's story "The Little Match Girl" in the format of Bach's "Saint Matthew Passion," interspersing Andersen's narrative with my versions of the crowd and character responses from Bach's Passion. The text is by me, after texts by Han Christian Andersen, H. P. Paulli (the first translator of the story into English, in 1872), Picander (the nom de plume of Christian Friedrich Henrici, the librettist of Bach's Saint Matthew Passion), and the Gospel according to Saint Matthew. The word passion comes from the Latin word for suffering. There is no Bach in my piece and there is no Jesus—rather the suffering of the Little Match Girl has been substituted for Jesus's, elevating (I hope) her sorrow to a higher plane.

== Reception ==
In 2019, writers of The Guardian ranked The Little Match Girl Passion the 15th greatest work of art music since 2000, with Andrew Clements calling it "one of the most original vocal works of recent times. Extracts from Andersen’s story and from St Matthew’s gospel are interleaved with closely woven vocal writing, that is [...] often comfortingly tonal and hauntingly affecting." The Little Match Girl Passion has been described as "a 21st century classic".
