= Simple Song Number 3 =

"Simple Song #3"

Single by Sumi Jo

from the album Youth
- Released: 20 May 2015
- Genre: Classical
- Length: 6:28
- Label: Milan Records
- Songwriter: David Lang
- Producers: Nicola Giuliano; Francesca Cima; Carlotta Calori

"Simple Song #3" or "Simple Song Number 3" is an original song sung by South Korean singer Sumi Jo. The song was released as the lead single from the soundtrack album of 2015 film Youth written and composed by American composer David Lang.

"Simple Song #3" was nominated for the 2016 Academy Award, Golden Globe Award and Critics Choice Award for best original song.

== Production ==
American composer David Lang wrote the music, including the piece "Simple Songs," which is fictionally performed for Queen Elizabeth at the end of the movie. The scene was shot with soprano Sumi Jo, violinist Viktoria Mullova, the BBC Concert Orchestra, and the Berlin Radio Choir.

== Accolades ==
Award	Category	Recipient	Result	Ref(s)
88th Academy Awards	Best Original Song	David Lang	Nominated	
21st Critics' Choice Awards	Best Original Song	David Lang	Nominated	
73rd Golden Globe Awards	Best Original Song	David Lang	Nominated	
2015 Houston Film Critics Society Awards	Best Original Song	David Lang	Nominated	
