= Theatre of Voices =

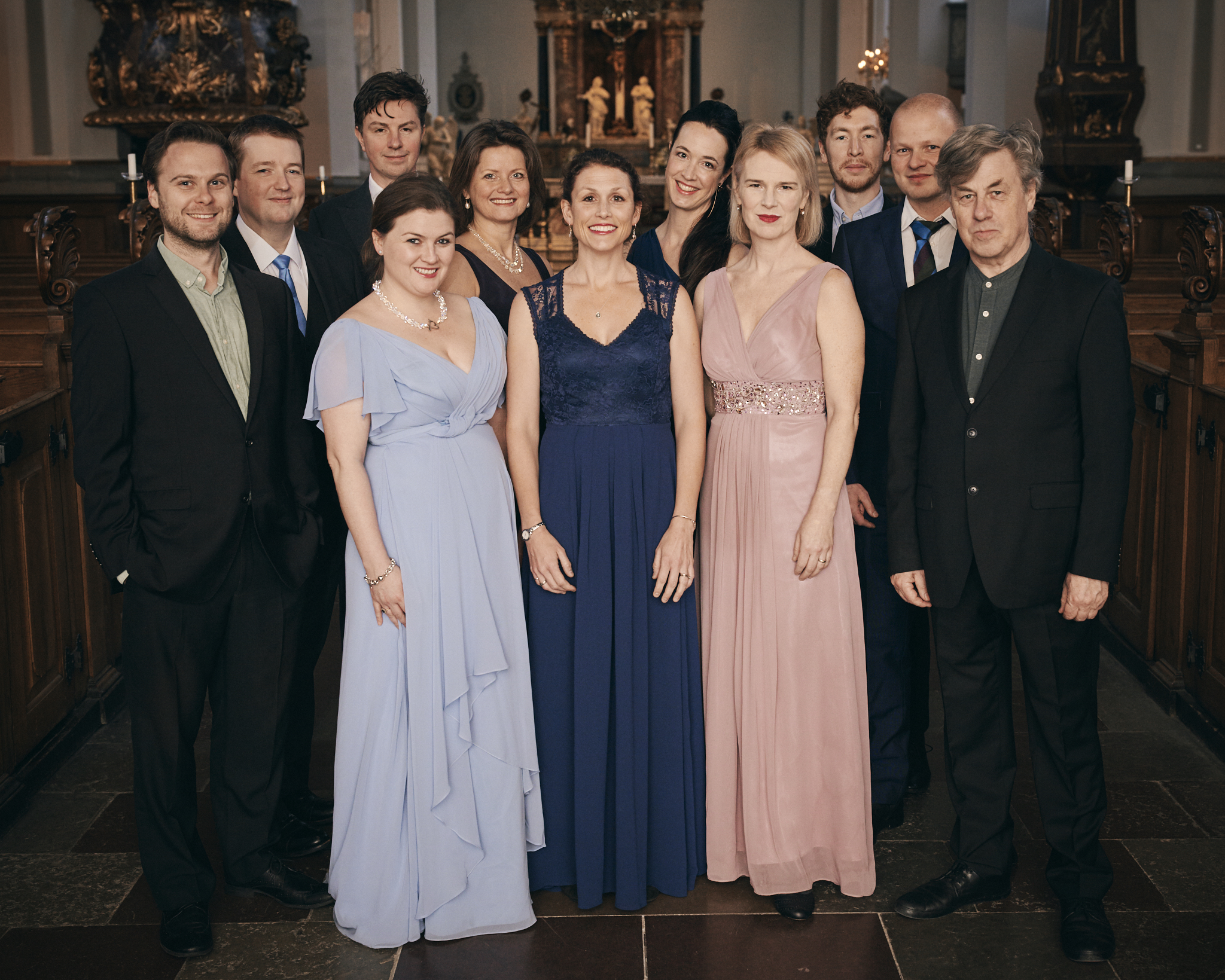
- Theatre of Voices in 2019
- Established: 1990
- Founder: Paul Hillier

Theatre of Voices is a vocal ensemble founded by baritone Paul Hillier in 1990; it focuses on early music and new music.

The ensemble was formed by Hillier while he was teaching at the University of California, Davis, as an avenue to performing more contemporary music while his other group, the Hilliard Ensemble, focused primarily on early music. Originally based in the United States, members of the group originated from both the United States and England. After Hillier's move to Copenhagen in 2003, membership in the group became more international, with members drawn from Denmark, Poland, England, and the United States.

Its main focus nowadays is on new music, though very often interwoven with various kinds of early music. Hillier and Theatre of Voices have enjoyed close collaborations with numerous composers and instrumental ensembles, including: Arvo Pärt, Steve Reich, Terry Riley, John Cage, the Kronos Quartet, Ingram Marshall, John Adams, Karlheinz Stockhausen, Pelle Gudmundsen-Holmgreen, London Sinfonietta, Michala Petri, Jóhann Jóhannsson, Fretwork, Phantasm, Concerto Copenhagen, Kaija Saariaho, Peter Sellars, David Lang, Michael Gordon, Pablo Ortiz, Heiner Goebbels, the Smith Quartet, Meta4 String Quartet, Helena Tulve, Sunleif Rasmussen, John Luther Adams, and many more.

In 2010, the group's 20th anniversary year, Theatre of Voices received a Grammy Award for David Lang's The Little Match Girl Passion. Theatre of Voices has also moved into the film world. Tracks from more than thirty CD recordings are used on movie soundtracks such as La Grande Bellezza and Arrival, and the ensemble has worked on film projects with Danish documentarist Phie Amboe and Oscar-nominated Icelandic composer Jóhann Jóhannsson. During 2018 the ensemble featured in Kaija Saariaho's opera Only the Sound Remains with performances at Palais Garnier in Paris, Teatro Real in Madrid and Lincoln Center. There were also orchestra productions with BBC Philharmonic and London Symphony Orchestra. In January 2019, Theatre of Voices gave a sold-out concert in the new Elbphilharmonie great hall in Hamburg, which included the world premiere of Michael Gordon's new work A Western, based on the film High Noon.

The group records with Harmonia Mundi USA and Dacapo Records. The ensemble also tours internationally.

The ensemble's membership varies according to the needs of the specific project they are working on; however the members listed below are most consistently involved.

== Notable members ==
- Paul Hillier - baritone
- Christopher Bowers-Broadbent - organ
- Else Torp, soprano
- Miriam Andersén, mezzo
- Signe Asmussen, mezzo
- Chris Watson, tenor
- Julian Podger, tenor
- Michala Petri, recorder

== Discography ==
- William Byrd: Motets & Mass for 4 Voices (1994).
- Orlande de Lassus: St. Matthew Passion; Paschal Vigil (1994).
- Carols From the Old & New Worlds (1994).
- Proensa (1994) - various medieval.
- Joan Airas de Santiago and King Dinis I of Portugal: Cantigas from the Court of Dom Dinis (1995) - Cantigas de Santa Maria and songs.
- Thomas Tallis: Lamentations, Motets, String Music (1996)- works by Thomas Tallis
- Steve Reich: Proverb/Nagoya Marimbas/City Life (1996)
- The Age of Cathedrals (1996) - various Notre Dame school composers.
- Arvo Pärt: De Profundis (1997).
- Carols from the Old & New Worlds, Vol. 2 (1998).
- John Cage: Litany for the Whale (1998).
- Monastic Chant: 12th & 13th Century Monophonic Chant (1998).
- Home to Thanksgiving (1999).
- Hoquetus (1999) - medieval Hockets.
- Arvo Pärt: I Am the True Vine (2000).
- Ingram Marshall: Kingdom Come; Hymnodic Delays; Fog Tropes II for String Quartet and Tap (2001)
- Fragments (2002).
- The Cries of London with Fretwork
- Karlheinz Stockhausen: Stimmung (Copenhagen Version). Else Torp, Louise Skovbæch, Clara Sanabras, Wolodymyr Smishkewych, Kasper Eliassen, Andrew Hendricks; Ian Dearden, sound diffusion. (recorded 2006). Harmonia Mundi CD HMU 807408. (2007).
- David Lang: The Little Match Girl Passion (2009) with Ars Nova (Copenhagen)
- Mixed Company (2012) with London Sinfonietta
- Buxtehude and his Circle (2016; recorded in 2013).
- Green Ground (2016) with Kronos Quartet
- Jóhann Jóhannsson: Arrival (2016) from the film Arrival
- Jóhann Jóhannsson: Orphée (2016)
- In Dulci Jubilo – Music for the Christmas season by Buxtehude and friends (2017)
- Jóhann Jóhannsson: Englabörn & Variations (2017)
- Mary Magdalene (2018) from the film Mary Magdalene
- Jóhann Jóhannsson and Yair Elazar Glotman: First and Last Men (2020)
