= Agnès Vesterman =

French cellist

Agnès Vesterman is a French classical cellist.

== Life ==
Vesterman studied the cello in Boulogne-Billancourt and then went to New York to study with Harvey Shapiro. Back from the United States, she joined the Quatuor Arpeggione with whom she played thirteen years, from 1988 to 2001, all over the world.

In 2006 she formed a duo with Garth Knox, violist and viola d'amore player.

A second duo was created with cellist Patrick Langot. With the painter Étienne Yver, they create the duets "d'Yver" by Nicolas Bacri, Philippe Forget and Régis Campo.

In March 2009, she recorded Philippe Forget's duets and suites for solo cello.

In April 2010, she recorded Olivier Greif's Sonata for two cellos La Bataille d'Azincourt. For the past two years, she has also been playing sonata with pianist Jean-François Bouvery.

Vesterman is a professor at the Conservatoire de Paris and at the Conservatoire de Boulogne-Billancourt.

She is interested in different body practices: Alexander Technique, tai chi, and their applications to the practice of string instruments.

She practices improvisation in concert and also in relation to the image during film-concerts or theatrical creations.

== Discography ==
- D'amore, in duo with Garth Knox, ECM.
- Duet with Bertrand Giraud (piano), works by Kodaly, Janáček, Prokofief.
- Anima, chamber music by Philippe Forget.
- The battle of Agincourt by Olivier Greif for two cellos.
- Bjuström Quartet, Ookpik.
