= Garth Knox =

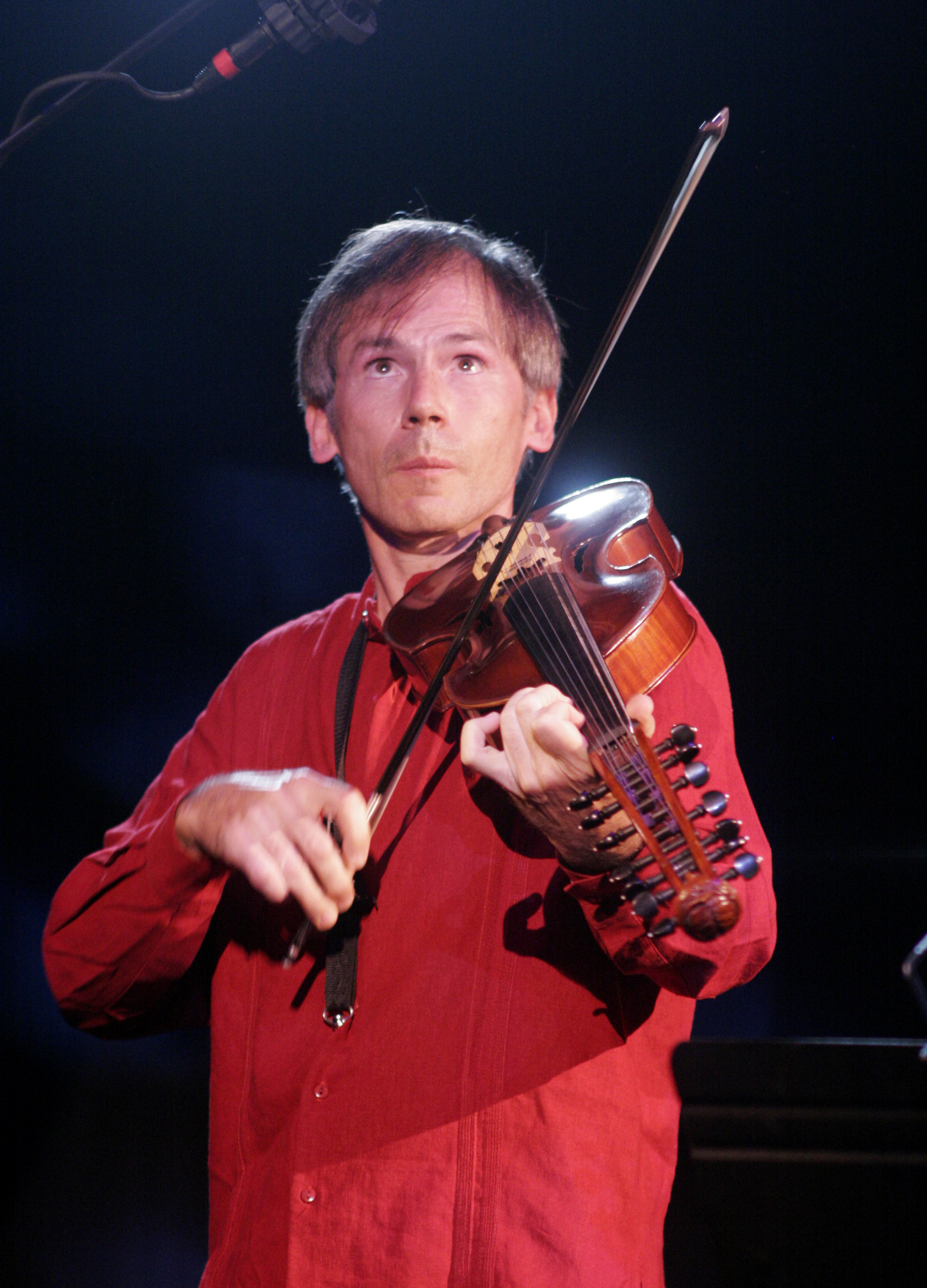
- Knox performing on the viola d'amore, 2008; Photo: Claire Stefani

Background information
- Born: 8 October 1956 (age 69); Dublin, Ireland
- Genres: Contemporary classical music
- Occupations: violist, composer
- Instruments: Viola, viola d'amore
- Years active: 1983–
- Labels: Naïve Records, ECM Records, Zeitklang records
- Website: Official website

Garth Knox (born 8 October 1956 in Dublin, Ireland) is a violist and composer who specializes in contemporary classical music and new music.

== Biography ==
Knox was the youngest of four siblings, and although he was born in Ireland, he was raised in Scotland, to a family who all played a variety of musical instruments. The youngest of four children who all played stringed instruments, Knox chose to study the viola as his primary instrument. After studies at the Royal College of Music in London with Frederick Riddle, he became a member of Pierre Boulez's Ensemble InterContemporain in Paris (1983–1990) then joined the Arditti Quartet in London (1990–1997). He has given first performances by and worked with most of the leading composers (György Ligeti, Iannis Xenakis, Karlheinz Stockhausen, Boulez, György Kurtág, Salvatore Sciarrino, Hans Werner Henze etc.). Now soloist on viola and viola d'amore, he lives in Paris.

As well as numerous recordings with the Ensemble InterContemporain and especially with the Arditti Quartet, his first solo CD, Works for Viola on Naïve Records, won the Deutscher Schallplattenpreis, the second is called Spectral Viola on Zeitklang records, and a recent Viola d'Amore CD with ECM Records was record of the month in the British magazine Gramophone (September 2008). In 2009 Garth Knox recorded another CD with ECM that was published in 2012: Saltarello – "a 14th-century fast Italian dance in ¾ time that survives today as a folk dance". Knox (fiddle, viola and viola d'amore) is accompanied by Agnès Vesterman (violoncello) and Sylvain Lemêtre (percussion). The compositions interpreted by the trio range from medieval music (Hildegard von Bingen, Guillaume de Machaut), renaissance (John Dowland), baroque (Henry Purcell, Antonio Vivaldi) to those of contemporaries like Kaija Saariaho and Garth Knox himself. The album published in 2012 was much acclaimed also by jazz critics.
