= Enedina Lloris =

Valencian soprano

Enedina Lloris Camps (born 1957 in Alfara del Patriarca) is a Valencian soprano. Lloris retired early from the opera stage and teaches at ESMUC.
