= David Lang (composer) =

American composer (born 1957)

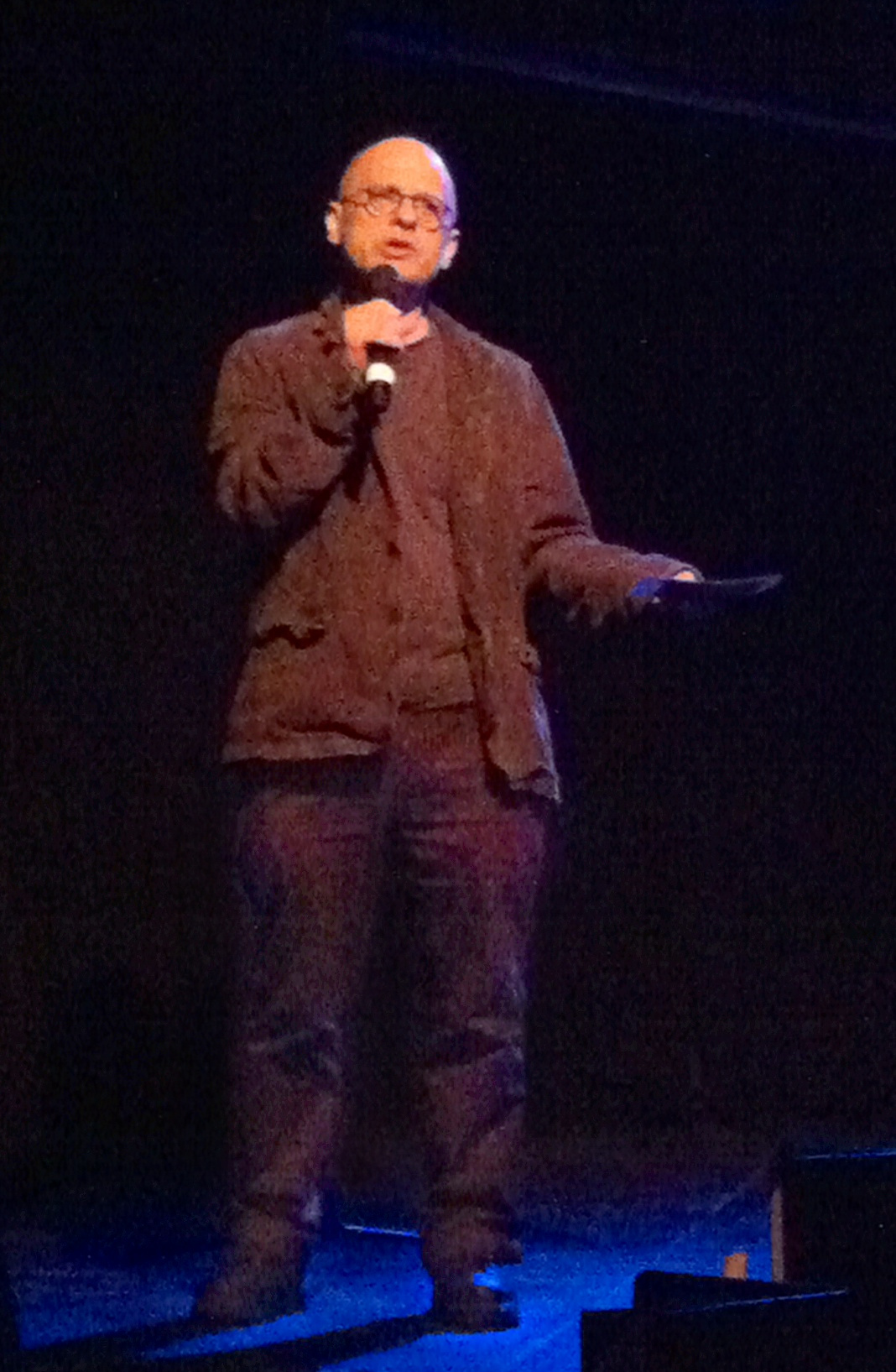
- Born: January 8, 1957 (age 69); Los Angeles, California, United States
- Era: Contemporary
- Known for: Bang on a Can; The Little Match Girl Passion

David Lang (born January 8, 1957) is an American composer living in New York City. Co-founder of the musical collective Bang on a Can, he was awarded the 2008 Pulitzer Prize for Music for The Little Match Girl Passion, which went on to win a 2010 Grammy Award for Best Small Ensemble Performance by Paul Hillier and Theatre of Voices. Lang was nominated for an Academy Award for "Simple Song #3" from the film Youth.

== Early life and education ==
Lang was born in Los Angeles, California. Lang is of Jewish descent. In his youth he played trombone. After completing his undergraduate degree at Stanford University, he went to the University of Iowa; he says, "There was a teacher in composition at the University of Iowa named Martin Jenni, and he had come to Stanford as a leave replacement to teach for a semester. And I just thought he was amazing. He knew a lot of stuff that I'd never heard of before. So when I thought about grad school, I went to Iowa. I was happy I did. It was really a kind of golden age. I really loved it."

Lang went on to earn a Doctorate of Musical Arts at Yale University in 1989. In addition to Jenni, his teachers have included Henri Lazarof, Lou Harrison, Richard Hervig, Jacob Druckman, Hans Werner Henze, and Martin Bresnick. Together with Julia Wolfe and Michael Gordon, Lang co-founded Bang on a Can in 1987. In 2008 he joined the Yale School of Music composition faculty. In 2016 he became the artist-in-residence at the Institute for Advanced Study.

== Stage productions ==
=== Collaborative works ===
In 1999 he collaborated with composers Julia Wolfe and Michael Gordon and librettist/illustrator Ben Katchor on the composition of the "comic strip opera" The Carbon Copy Building. The production won an Obie Award for Best New American Production. Lang, Wolfe and Gordon subsequently collaborated with librettist Deborah Artman on the 'oratorio' Lost Objects, the recording of which was released in summer 2001 (Teldec New Line). Their next collaborative project was Shelter, a multi-media work also with librettist Deborah Artman, for the Scandinavian vocal group Trio Mediaeval and the German ensemble musikFabrik, which was performed in Germany and the U.S. in 2005. In 2017 Chinese singer Gong Linna premiered Cloud River Mountain, written by the three Bang on a Can composers in addition to Lao Luo. They also premiere Road Trip, a celebration of Bang on a Can's 30-year journey, together at the Brooklyn Academy of Music in October 2017.

=== The Difficulty of Crossing a Field ===
Also in 1999, Lang and playwright Mac Wellman based their opera The Difficulty of Crossing a Field on a short story by Ambrose Bierce, about an Alabama planter named Williamson who purportedly vanished while walking across a field in 1854. (Bierce's story reoccurs in urban-legend form, in which, coincidentally, the vanished man is often given the name David Lang.)

=== battle hymns ===
A piece with multiple choruses and dance, battle hymns was first performed in Philadelphia in 2009 by the Mendelssohn Club and the Leah Stein Dance Company. Its U.S. west coast premiere was directed by Robert Geary and performed by the San Francisco Choral Society, Volti, the Piedmont Children's Choir, and the Leah Stein Dance Company in April 2013 at the Kezar Pavilion. In May 2014, the Collegiate Chorale and the Manhattan Girls Chorus performed battle hymns at the Intrepid Sea, Air & Space Museum. In 2015, the Shenandoah Chorus (Shenandoah University) performed battle hymns at an on-campus concert.

=== The Little Match Girl Passion ===
Lang was awarded the 2008 Pulitzer Prize in music for his piece The Little Match Girl Passion, composed in 2007 for Paul Hillier and his Theatre of Voices. The piece, based on Hans Christian Andersen's fable "The Little Match Girl" and inspired by Bach's St. Matthew Passion, was co-commissioned by the Carnegie Hall Corporation and the Perth Theatre and Concert Hall and premiered on October 25, 2007, in Zankel Hall in New York City. Tim Page of The Washington Post wrote that "I don't think that I've ever been so moved by a new...composition as I was by David Lang's The Little Match Girl Passion, which is unlike any music I know." For the 2017 Metropolitan Museum of Art's annual holiday concert, which has included the little match girl passion for five years, Lang has written a new version called the little match girl (observed), in which the audience is the congregation and participates with interstitial hymns.

The recording by Theatre of Voices and Paul Hillier of The Little Match Girl Passion on Harmonia Mundi received a 2010 Grammy Award for Best Small Ensemble Performance. The Little Match Girl Passion has been described as "a 21st century classic".

=== Death Speaks ===
Lang composed this song cycle – a commission from Carnegie Hall and Stanford Lively Arts, premiered at both in late January, 2012 – as a companion piece to the little match girl passion. In that work, death was an implied character; in this follow-up song cycle, death is personified. For the texts sung by the character "Death," Lang turned to the songs of Franz Schubert, from which he made his own translations into English. The part of Death was sung by Shara Worden of My Brightest Diamond; the instrumentalists included Bryce Dessner of The National (band) on guitar, Nico Muhly on piano, and Owen Pallett on violin and voice. National Public Radio chose the commercial recording as one of its ten favorite classical albums of 2013.

=== The Whisper Opera ===
Lang wrote the libretto by typing short, personal phrases into a search engine and writing down the results. The opera includes these anonymous confessions, which are whispered by soprano Tony Arnold, while four instrumentalists from the International Contemporary Ensemble never play above a hush. No audience member can hear the entire opera and it cannot be recorded, so it can only be experienced live.

=== Crowd Out ===
Inspired by the powerful singing he heard from the crowd at an Arsenal F.C. football match, Lang came up with the idea of composing a song for over 1,000 people to sing. The first performance was 9 June 2014 at Birmingham's Millennium Point. Singers were split into groups arranged on the steps of the atrium, each one with a leader with a megaphone. The conductor was Simon Halsey. The lyrics came from Lang doing internet searches for the phrase "When I am in a crowd I …" Lang then organised the results into thematic groups.

=== The National Anthems ===
The composer surveyed all of the national anthems of the world, drew ideas and phrases from them, and translated them into English. Musically, it is very similar to The Little Match Girl Passion made up primarily of short, arpeggiated phrases. It is scored for chorus and string quartet. It was premiered on June 7, 2014 at Walt Disney Concert Hall by the Los Angeles Master Chorale, and the recording of the world premiere came out on Cantaloupe Music in the spring of 2016. The Winnipeg Symphony Orchestra, where Lang was Composer-in-Residence in 2015-16, performed the Canadian premiere of the national anthems, Trinity Choir Wall Street performed the New York premiere as part of their Twelfth Night Festival, and the London Symphony Chorus performed the UK premiere.

=== anatomy theater ===
Inspired by the 18th-century practice of public dissections of criminals, anatomy theater, with music by Lang and libretto by Lang and visual artist Mark Dion, premiered at Los Angeles Opera in 2016. It begins with the confession and execution of an English murderess and follows the quest of the anatomist, searching for signs of evil within her body, including an aria for the corpse. The audience was served food and drink and placed in the balcony, to put it in the position of the 18th-century witnesses to the dissection. When the work premiered at LA Opera this June, critics called it a fascinating, grisly, and profound exploration of the nature of evil. The original cast recording was released on Cantaloupe Music with Marc Kudisch, Peabody Southwell, Robert Osborne, Timur, International Contemporary Ensemble, and conducted by Christopher Rountree.

=== The Loser ===
Lang's one-act chamber opera for solo baritone is based on Thomas Bernhard's novel, The Loser. Lang first read Bernhard's novel in 1998 and immediately sensed it was something he wanted to set to music. Lang served as composer, librettist and director of the loser. Produced by Bang on a Can, the loser opened the 2016 BAM Next Wave Festival. Its unusual staging placed the singer Rod Gilfry on a platform above the orchestra seating and at eye level with the theater's balcony. The only other person visible was pianist Conrad Tao, on a platform far behind Gilfry. A small ensemble was heard offstage. The orchestra seating was removed for the production. Lang and the loser were awarded the 2016 Richard B. Fisher Next Wave Award.

=== Symphony for a Broken Orchestra ===
More than 1,000 musical instruments owned by the School District of Philadelphia cannot be played because they are broken. As part of an ongoing project to repair the broken instruments, in collaboration with Temple Contemporary, the Philadelphia Orchestra, the Boyer College of Music and Dance, the Curtis Institute of Music, and the school district, Lang wrote a symphony specifically for the sounds that the instruments make in their broken state. Professional musicians and community members played in the orchestra or adopted an instrument. After the performance the instruments were fixed and returned to the public schools.

=== Prisoner of the State ===
This opera with the New York Philharmonic received its premiere on June 6, 2019. It is based on Fidelio by Beethoven and directed by Elkhanah Pulitzer.

=== flower, forget me ===
These songs for baritone and piano premiered in 2022 and premiered in the United States in 2025. They were "commissioned by Konzerthaus Dortmund, for the baritone Benjamin Appl, specifically to go on a program with Schubert's great song cycle Die schöne Müllerin".

=== the wealth of nations ===
The oratorio the wealth of nations for mezzo-soprano, baritone and orchestra was commissioned by the New York Philharmonic (Gustavo Dudamel, Oscar L. Tang and [Agnes Hsu-Tang|H. M. Agnes Hsu-Tang) and the Aspen Music Festival and School. Set to texts by Adam Smith (The Wealth of Nations), Franklin D. Roosevelt, Frederick Douglass, Ralph Waldo Emerson, Edith Wharton, Eugene V. Debs, and Maria W. Stewart, it premiered on March 19, 2026, at David Geffen Hall, New York City.

== Awards ==
Lang has received several awards, including:

- Rome Prize, 1991
- Bessie Award, 1999
- Obie Award, 2000
- Pulitzer Prize in Music, 2008
- Grammy Award for Best Small Ensemble Performance, 2009
- Musical America Composer of the Year, 2013
- Royal Philharmonic Society Music Award, 2017
- Joseph H. Bearns Prize

== Film music ==
He wrote the arrangements for the Kronos Quartet in Requiem for a Dream, scored the documentary The Woodmans, and wrote the soundtrack for (Untitled). In (Untitled), Lang wrote the score and the music for the main character, a classical composer played by Adam Goldberg. In Lang's 2015 film score, Youth for Italian director Paolo Sorrentino, he also provided the music for the protagonist, a composer and conductor played by Michael Caine. "Simple Song #3", an original song from Youth, was nominated for the 2016 Academy Award, Golden Globe Award and Critics Choice Award for best original song.

In Italy, the Youth score and "Simple Song #3" won the David di Donatello awards for Best Score and Best Original Song. The Youth movie soundtrack also featured Lang's choral song "Just (After Song of Songs)," a composition that was originally commissioned by the Louth Contemporary Music Society. Most recently, he is scoring Paul Dano's film Wildlife.

== Recorded works ==
Lang's music has been released on the Argo/Decca, BMG, Cantaloupe Music, Chandos, CRI, Naxos Records, Point Music, and Sony Classical labels. His solo albums for Cantaloupe include The Passing Measures (2001) with the Birmingham Contemporary Music Group, Child (2003) played by Sentieri selvaggi, and Elevated (2005) featuring performances by Audrey Riley, A Change of Light, and Lisa Moore. His music has also been represented on recordings by Icebreaker, So Percussion, Bang on a Can All-Stars and Evan Ziporyn. A version of "Wed" (1996) for string quartet is featured on ETHEL's 2012 album Heavy. His scores are published by Red Poppy Music.

== Recordings ==
- Are You Experienced (1989)
- The Passing Measures (2001)
- Child (2003)
- Elevated (2005)
- Pierced (2008)
- The Little Match Girl Passion (2009)
- (Untitled), music from the film (2009)
- This Was Written By Hand (2011)
- The Woodmans, music from the film (2011)
- Death Speaks (2013)
- Love Fail (2014)
- The Difficulty of Crossing a Field (2015)
- The National Anthems (2016)
- Thorn (2017)
- The Day (2018)
- Writing on Water (2018)
- Mystery Sonatas (2018) performed by Augustin Hadelich
- Anatomy Theater (2019) with libretto by Mark Dion
- The Loser (2020)
- Prisoner of the State (2020)
- The Village Detective (2021)
- David Lang: The Writings (Pentatone) (2022)

=== Film ===
- Featured in New York Composers: Searching for a New Music (1997). Directed by Michael Blackwood.
- Arrangements for Requiem for a Dream (2000)
- Score for Amelia (film by Édouard Lock) (2002)
- Score for (Untitled) (2009)
- Score for The Woodmans (2012)
- His music is featured in Paolo Sorrentino's film La grande bellezza (2014)
- Score for Paolo Sorrentino's film Youth (2015)
- Score for Paul Dano's film Wildlife (2017)

=== Ballets ===
- Plainspoken, choreographed by Benjamin Millepied
