= American Modern Ensemble =

- Origin: New York, New York, United States
- Genre: Contemporary classical
- Occupation: Chamber ensemble
- Years active: 2005 -present
- Labels: American Modern Recordings, Bridge Records
- Website: http://www.americanmodernensemble.org

The American Modern Ensemble is a contemporary classical music ensemble based in the United States in New York City with the goal of premiering, performing and recording and commissioning the widest possible repertoire written by American composers. The group's focus is to celebrate and showcase American music and especially works written by living composers. AME is also dedicated to education and outreach programs that expose communities to American music, and particularly to new music written by living composers. AME was founded in 2005 by American composer Robert Paterson, who serves as the ensemble's Artistic Director, and his wife, Victoria Paterson, a violinist, who also serves as the ensemble's Executive Director.

== Instrumentation ==
Instrumentation for each concert is repertoire/instrumentation-based and is drawn from a sinfonietta-sized group: flute (doubling alto flute and piccolo), clarinet (doubling bass clarinet and E♭ clarinet), oboe (doubling English horn), bassoon (doubling contrabassoon), horn, trumpet (C trumpet, B♭ trumpet and piccolo trumpets in E♭ and D), trombone, percussion, piano (doubling synthesizer), two violins, viola, violoncello, bass.

== Programmed composers ==
Incomplete list of composers whose works have been programmed by the American Modern Ensemble through the 2014-15 season:

- John Adams
- John Luther Adams
- Karim Al-Zand
- Dominick Argento
- Milton Babbitt
- Dennis Bathory-Kitsz
- Jacob Bancks
- Armando Bayolo
- Lembit Beecher
- Christopher Berg
- Derek Bermel
- Leonard Bernstein
- Chester Biscardi
- Alexandra du Bois
- William Bolcom
- Victoria Bond
- Margaret Brouwer
- Steven Burke
- John Cage
- Elliott Carter
- George Chadwick
- Theodore Chanler
- Chen Yi
- Paul Chihara
- Aaron Copland
- John Corigliano
- Stuart Dempster
- Chen Yi
- Robert Dick
- Celius Dougherty
- Jacob Druckman
- John Eaton
- Roshanne Etezady
- Stephen Foster
- Gabriela Lena Frank
- Vivian Fung
- Annie Gosfield
- Daron Hagen
- David Heuser
- Lee Hyla
- Aaron Jay Kernis
- Libby Larsen
- Hannah Lash
- Tom Lehrer
- Lowell Liebermann
- Michael Lowenstern
- James Matheson
- Missy Mazzoli
- Eric Moe
- Paul Moravec
- Conlon Nancarrow
- Ethelbert Nevin
- Robert Paterson
- Stephen Paulus
- Joseph Pehrson
- David Rakowski
- Todd Reynolds
- Peter Schickele
- Elliot Schwartz
- Laura Schwendinger
- Alex Shapiro
- Adam Silverman
- William "Bill" Smith
- Steven Stucky
- Vineet Shende
- Augusta Read Thomas
- Joan Tower
- Perry Townsend
- David Del Tredici
- George Tsontakis
- Melinda Wagner
- Mischa Zupko
- Zhou Long
- Pamela Z

== Artists ==
Performer Members of AME as of the 2015-16 Season:

Artistic Director, House Composer and Conductor
- Robert Paterson†

Guest Conductors

- Tyson Deaton
- Delta David Gier
- Steven Mackey
- David Alan Miller
- Steven Osgood
- Robert Wood

Flute

- Sato Moughalian†
- Margaret Lancaster†
- Janet Axelrod
- Robert Dick
- Erin Lesser
- Amelia Lukas

Oboe

- Keve Wilson†
- Sarah Schram
- Mark Snyder

Clarinet

- Benjamin Fingland†
- Nicholas Gallas†
- Michael Lowenstern
- William O. Smith
- Meighan Stoops
- Eric Umble

Saxophone

- Jeremy Justeson†
- Allen Won
- Javier Oviedo

French horn

- Amie Margoles†
- Jeff Scott

Bassoon

- Charles McCracken†
- Gilbert DeJean

Trombone

- Stuart Dempster
- Mark Broschinsky

Percussion

- Matt Ward†
- Robert Paterson†
- Bill Solomon
- Clara Warnaar
- Tom Kolor
- Pablo Rieppi
- Peter Jarvis

Piano

- Blair McMillen†
- John Eaton
- Stephen Gosling
- Maya Hartman
- Eric Huebner
- Riko Higuma
- Ieva Jokubaviciute
- Aaron Likness
- Molly Morkoski

Violin

- Regi Papa†
- Victoria Paterson†
- Robin Zeh†
- Philip Payton†
- Eugenia Choi†
- Curtis Macomber
- Todd Reynolds

Viola

- Jessica Meyer†
- Orlando Wells†
- Danielle Farina
- Junah Chung
- Hsin-Yun Huang

Cello

- Dave Eggar†
- Arash Amini†
- Raman Ramakrishnan†
- Wendy Sutter
- Michael Katz
- Robert Burkhart
- Laura Bontrager
- Eric Jacobsen

Bass

- Sean McClowry†
- Roger Wagner†

Guitar

- Scott Kuney
- Austin Moorehead

Harp

- Jacqueline Kerrod†
- Bridget Kibbey

Vocalists

- Leah Edwards, soprano
- Jacquelyn Familant, soprano
- Nancy Allen Lundy, soprano
- Sharon Quattrin, soprano
- Melissa Wimbish, soprano
- Anna Tonna, mezzo-soprano
- Jesse Blumberg, tenor
- Robert Frankenberry, tenor
- Brandon Snook, tenor
- Dimitri Pittas, tenor
- Paul Sperry, tenor
- Kyle Guglielmo, baritone
- Robert Gardner, baritone
- David Neal, bass-baritone
- Pamela Z, voice

Choreographer-In-Residence

- Annmaria Mazzini, Mazzini Dance Collective

†Denotes current core member.

== AME Composition Competition ==
Since 2006, AME has held an annual composition competition for American composers (North, Central and South America). Through 2011, this competition was for composers ages 18–35. Starting in 2012, awards are now given in three categories: Tier I (Young Artist), ages 22 and under; Tier II (Emerging), ages 18–35, and Tier III (Professional), all ages. Former winners from 2011 and past are now considered Tier II winners. Winners receive cash awards, archival recordings and performances of either their winning work or another work.

2014 Ninth Annual Competition

Tier III

- Winner: John Fitz Rogers - Sehnen
- Honorable Mention: Max Grafe - Kheir
- Honorable Mention: Nicholas Omiccioli - push/pull
- Honorable Mention: Wayne Oquin - In Dreams Awake

Tier II

- Winner: Gabriella Smith - Brandenburg Interstices
- Honorable Mention: Michael Gilbertson - who remembers day
- Honorable Mention: Carolina Heredia - Lus in Bello
- Honorable Mention: Alexander Miller - Echoes in the Dark

Tier I

- Winner: Vincent Gover - Brook’s Release
- Honorable Mention: Ryan Lindveit - Short Stories

2013 Eighth Annual Competition

Tier III

- Winner: Carl Schimmel - Roadshow for Otto
- Honorable Mention: Nicolas Scherzinger - Fractured Mirrors
- Honorable Mention: Roger Zare - Fractal Miniatures

Tier II

- Winner: Nicholas Omiccioli - Flourishes
- Honorable Mention: Paul Frucht - Echo in Roger’s Park
- Honorable Mention: Takuma Itoh - Undercurrent

Tier I

- Winner: Katherine Balch - Triple Point
- Honorable Mention: Molly Joyce - Parade
- Honorable Mention: Brendan McMullen - Seven Cicadas

2012 Seventh Annual Competition

Tier III

- Winner: Alejandro Rutty - Black Box Bossa
- Honorable Mention: John Liberatore - Lennon Scatters and Fleeces His Flock

Tier II

- Winner: Lembit Beecher - Frantic Gnarly Still
- Honorable Mention: Piotr Szewczyk - Nimbus

Tier I

- Winner: Hillary Purrington - Fixed Mediums
- Honorable Mention: Loren Loiacono - Waking Rhythm

Past Winners

- 2011: Eric Nathan
- 2010: Christopher Chandler
- 2009: Spencer Topel
- 2008: Derrick Wang
- 2007: Sean McClowry
- 2006: Karim Al-Zand
