= Frank J. Oteri =

American composer

- Born: May 12, 1964; Miami, Florida, U.S.
- Education: Columbia University
- Occupations: Composer; Music Journalist; Lecturer
- Organizations: International Society for Contemporary Music; The New School; Mannes School of Music; Vermont College of Fine Arts; CalArts; Cornish College of the Arts; International Association of Music Centres; American Society of Composers, Authors, and Publishers

Frank J. Oteri (born May 12, 1964) is a New York City-based composer, a music journalist, lecturer, and new music advocate.

His musical works have been performed in venues from Carnegie's Weill Recital Hall to the Los Angeles Museum of Contemporary Art. He was initially interested in composing for musical theatre, and an original musical of his was staged for a week at New York's Carter Hotel Theater in 1980 while he was still a student at The High School of Music & Art, which later merged with the High School of Performing Arts as the Fiorello H. LaGuardia High School of Music & Art and Performing Arts.

He made a brief appearance in the Alan Parker-directed motion picture Fame and scored two children's operas for the Metropolitan Opera Guild's In School project. As an undergraduate at Columbia University (1981–1985), he grew more interested in minimalism, microtonality, and non-western music, and he completed a master's degree in ethnomusicology at Columbia in 1990.

In the 1990s, he returned to writing extensively for the voice, setting poems by E. E. Cummings, Margaret Atwood, William Butler Yeats, and Kenneth Patchen. In 1998 he began working with Italian painter and performance artist Lucio Pozzi on MACHUNAS, an evening-length performance oratorio based on the life of Fluxus-founder George Maciunas which they completed in 2002. In 2005, MACHUNAS was staged at the Contemporary Art Centre (Vilnius) in Vilnius, Lithuania, and was subsequently screened in New York City and San Francisco.

In February 2008, Oteri was composer-in-residence at the Cornish College of the Arts in Seattle, Washington, where three of his compositions were performed: The Other Side of the Window (1995), a cycle of seven Margaret Atwood poems scored for female voice, two flutes, guitar, cello, and toy piano; is 7 (2003) for solo harpsichord, performed by Trudy Chan; and Imagined Overtures (2005) for rock band in 36-tone equal temperament.

Oteri is also an active music journalist and served as the editor of NewMusicBox since its inception at the American Music Center in May 1999 until August 2023. Oteri has served as the MC for the ASCAP Thru The Walls showcase in New York City as well as Meet The Composer's The Works marathon in Minneapolis in 2002. From 2000 to 2010, he curated his own series, 21st Century Schizoid Music, at the Cornelia Street Cafe in Manhattan's Greenwich Village.

In 2007, Oteri was the recipient of the ASCAP Victor Herbert Award for his "distinguished service to American music as composer, journalist, editor, broadcaster, impresario, and advocate" and in 2012 he additionally received an ASCAP Deems Taylor Award for an article he wrote about The Beach Boys' The Smile Sessions. In 2018, he received the Composers Now Visionary Award and the Untwelve Micro-Cosmos (Mikrokosmos) Microtonal Pedagogy Award. In 2019, he was elected vice president of the International Society for Contemporary Music (ISCM) and in 2025 he was elected president. In January 2021, the South Dakota Symphony Orchestra (SDSO) under the direction of Delta David Gier premiered Oteri's pandemic-themed orchestral work Already Yesterday or Still Tomorrow for a limited, physically distanced live audience, due to the pandemic; it was also streamed online on the SDSO's Facebook page. In August 2022, Oteri was appointed to the faculty of The New School's College of Performing Arts (which includes The Mannes School of Music) and in August 2023, he joined the faculty full time as assistant professor of musicology. He is also on the Music Composition Residency Faculty of the Vermont College of Fine Arts (VCFA) which, since January 2025, has taken place at the California Institute of the Arts (CalArts). In June 2024, the Music Publishers Association (MPA) awarded Oteri its Award for Composer Advocacy.

== Articles and interviews ==
- "A discussion with composer Frank J. Oteri (2018)". untwelve.org.
- "Frank J. Oteri Interview". AllPianoLessons.
- McManus, Drew (June 5, 2006). "An Interview with Frank J. Oteri". Inside the Arts.
- "Background on Frank J. Oteri [with interview]". ArtistHouseMusic.
