= Dark Waves (composition) =

Dark Waves is a 2007 musical composition in one movement by the American composer John Luther Adams. It was commissioned by Musica Nova for the Anchorage Symphony Orchestra, who premiered the composition in 2007. The piece is dedicated to the Alaskan conductor Gordon Wright, who died a few days before the world premiere.

== Composition ==
=== Style ===
Dark Waves was the first time Adams mixed electronics with a symphony orchestra, about which he wrote in the program note, "I began with an impossible orchestra - large choirs of virtual instruments, with no musicians, no articulation and no breathing - sculpting layer upon layer into expansive waves of sound. Then I added the human element. The musicians of the real orchestra impart depth and texture, shimmer and substance to the electronic sounds. They give the music life. Their instruments speak in different ways. They change bow directions. They breathe. They play at different speeds. They ride the waves." Adams constructed these musical "waves" on perfect fifths, using tempo relationships of 3, 5, and 7. He wrote, "At the central moment, these waves crest together in a tsunami of sound encompassing all twelve chromatic tones and the full range of the orchestra." The composer concluded, "As I composed Dark Waves I pondered the ominous events of our times: terrorism and war, intensifying storms and wildfires, the melting of the polar ice and the rising of the seas. Yet even in the presence of our deepening fears, we find ourselves immersed in the mysterious beauty of this world. Amid the turbulent waves we may still find the light, the wisdom and the courage we need to pass through this darkness of our own making."

Music critics like Alex Ross of The New Yorker—and Adams himself—have described Dark Waves as a stylist precursor to the composer's Pulitzer Prize for Music-winning 2013 composition Become Ocean. In an interview with BBC Music Magazine, Adams commented on the similarities, saying, "In 2007 I wrote Dark Waves, a 12-minute piece for orchestra. I love it and was really pleased with it but several listeners told me they thought it was too short. But I knew that I had stumbled on something that needed exploring on a larger scale. A year or two later Ludovic Morlot and the Seattle Symphony asked for a piece and we settled on an idea that I described as 'Dark Waves on steroids'. To my surprise and delight they went for it." However, Mike Dunham of Alaska Dispatch News remarked, "It was said that the winning composition, Become Ocean, a 40-minute cosmos of sound for three orchestras, had its genesis with Dark Waves, a short piece premiered by the Anchorage Symphony in 2007. I'm not sure I get a direct connection, but Adams' music may be generally sorted into two categories: the noisy, heavily percussive pieces and the more atmospheric, dreamy and even melodic works. Both Dark Waves and Become Ocean fall into the second group."

=== Instrumentation ===
Adams composed two versions of Dark Waves: one for two pianos and another for orchestra. The orchestral version calls for an ensemble comprising:

Woodwinds
2 piccolos
2 oboes
2 clarinets in B♭
contrabass clarinet in B♭ or E♭
2 bassoons
contrabassoon

Brass
2 horns in F
2 trumpets in C
2 trombones
bass trombone
tuba

Percussion, 2 players
bass drum
cymbal, suspended
tubular bells
2 vibraphones

Keyboards
celesta
piano

Strings
violins I (minimum of 12 players)
violins II (minimum of 12 players)
violas (minimum of 9 players)
cellos (minimum of 9 players)
double basses (minimum of 6 players)

and electronics.

== Reception ==
The music critic Alex Ross called Dark Waves "one of the most arresting American orchestral compositions of recent years," adding, "it suggests a huge entity, of indeterminate shape, that approaches slowly, exerts apocalyptic force, and then recedes. Every instrument is, in one way or another, playing with the simple interval of the perfect fifth—the basic building block of harmony—but at the climax lines coalesce into roaring dissonances, with all twelve notes of the chromatic scale sounding together." In 2014, Andrew Clements of The Guardian described it as "effectively a dark, compact precursor of the monumental Becoming Ocean [sic], with which Adams won a Pulitzer prize earlier this year." He added, "It's an 11-minute span combining layers of electronic and orchestral sound that move in and out of phase to generate a gigantic climax and then subside, all done with such subtlety and sophistication..." Ivan Hewett of The Daily Telegraph similarly said it "offered a model of how a vastly ambitious expressive intent can be captured exactly, in a form as succinct as a Haydn minuet. It evoked wave motions vaster than any seen on planet Earth, in sounds that seemed to reverberate below and above our hearing."
