= Chester Biscardi =

Italian American composer and educator

Chester Biscardi (b. Kenosha, Wisconsin, October 19, 1948; nicknamed Chet) is an Italian American composer and educator.

He received a B.A. degree in English literature from the University of Wisconsin–Madison (1970); he studied during 1969–1970 at the University of Bologna and the Conservatorio di Musica "G. B. Martini"; he received an M.A. in Italian literature from the University of Wisconsin–Madison (1972); he received an M.M. in composition from the University of Wisconsin–Madison (1974); he received a M.M.A. in composition from Yale University (1976); and he received a D.M.A. in composition from Yale University (1980).

His composition instructors have included Les Thimmig, Mario Davidovsky, Robert Morris, Frank Lewin, Yehudi Wyner, Krzysztof Penderecki and Tōru Takemitsu.

He has been a member of the faculty of Sarah Lawrence College since 1977. He is openly gay.

Biscardi's music has been released on the Albany, American Modern Recordings, Bridge, CRI (New World Records), Furious Artisans, Intim Musik (Sweden), Naxos, New Albion, New Ariel, North/South Recordings, Perfect Enemy Records, and Sept Jardins (Canada) labels.

== Selected works ==
Works by Biscardi are published by Merion Music, C.F. Peters and Biscardi Music Press.
Stage

- Tight-Rope, Chamber Opera in 9 uninterrupted scenes (1985); libretto by Henry Butler
- The Duchess of Malfi, Music for the play by John Webster for 9 instrumentalists and voices (1976)

Orchestral

- At the Still Point (1977)

Concertante

- Chartres for solo piano and chamber ensemble (1973)
- Piano Concerto for piano and orchestra (1983)
- Recognition for piano and violin with string orchestra (2004, 2007)

Chamber music

- Tartini for violin and piano (1972)
- orpha for string quartet, marimba and vibraphone (1974)
- Tenzone for 2 flutes and piano (1975)
- they had ceased to talk for violin, viola, horn and piano (1975)
- Trio for violin, cello and piano (1976)
- Trasumanar for 12 percussionists and piano (1980)
- Di Vivere for clarinet and piano (1981), or for clarinet and piano, with flute, violin and cello (1981)
- Music for Witch Dance for 2 percussionists (1983)
- Incitation to Desire (Tango) for clarinet, horn, violin, cello, percussion and piano (1984, 1993); original for piano solo
- Incitation to Desire (Tango) for marimba solo (1984, 2006); original for piano solo
- Traverso for flute and piano (1987)
- No Feeling Is the Same As Before for soprano saxophone solo (1988)
- Companion Piece (for Morton Feldman) for double bass and piano (1989)
- Netori (音取り) for violin, oboe, horn; horn, clarinet, cello; and piano (1990)
- Music for an Occasion for 4 horns, 3 trumpets, 3 trombones, tuba, piano and percussion (1992; revised 2003)
- Resisting Stillness for 2 guitars (1996)
- Chamber Fanfare for flute, violin, cello, percussion and piano (1999)
- Music for NASDAQ MarketSiteTV for flute, horn, violin, cello, percussion and piano (1999)
- Piano Quintet for piano and violin, with violin, viola and cello (2004)
- The Viola Had Suddenly Become a Voice for viola and piano (2005)
- Footfalls (after Beckett) for flute, oboe, two guitars, tingsha, violin and violoncello (2012)
- Footfalls (after Beckett) for flute, oboe, piano, violin and violoncello (2012); original for flute, oboe, two guitars, tingsha, violin and violoncello
- Photo | Pier | Moonlight for violin duo (2015; rev. 2016)
- Suddenly Cello for violoncello and piano (2005/2020)

Piano

- Nel giardinetto della villa for piano 4 hands (1994)
- Companion Piece (for Morton Feldman) (1989, 1991)
- Incitation to Desire (Tango) (1984)
- In Time's Unfolding (2000)
- Piano Sonata (1986; revised 1987)
- Mestiere (1979)

Vocal

- Turning for violin, soprano, and string trio (1973)
- Trusting Lightness for soprano and piano (1975)
- Chez Vous for voice and piano (1983; revised 2007)
- "Poet's Aria" from Tight-Rope for baritone (or tenor) and piano (1985)
- The Gift of Life for soprano and piano (1990–1993)
- Baby Song of the Four Winds for mezzo-soprano (or soprano) and piano (1994)
- Guru for voice (or voices) and piano (1995)
- Prayers of Steel for baritone and piano (1998)
- The Child Comes Every Winter for voice and piano (1999)
- Recovering for voice and piano (2000)
- Modern Love Songs for voice and piano (1997–2002)

What a Coincidence
I Wouldn't Know about That
Someone New
Now You See It, Now You Don't
At Any Given Moment

- Sailors & Dreamers for voice and chamber ensemble / voice and piano (2007-2010)

You've Been on My Mind
Play Me a Song
Seven O'clock at the Cedar (Ode to Kline/de Kooning)
Do You Remember?
I Dance the Tango
Falling Fast
It's Time to Feel Alright Now

- Broken Stars That Go Dark for voice and piano (2016)

Choral

- Heabakes: Five Sapphic Lyrics for mixed chorus, 2 solo sopranos, solo alto, and percussion (1974)
- Indovinello for 12 voices (1974)
- Eurydice for women's chorus and 17 instruments (1978)
- Good-Bye, My Fancy! for mixed chorus a cappella and narrator (1982)
- Mama Never Forgets Her Birds from The Gift of Life for mixed chorus and piano (1997)
- The Child Comes Every Winter for mixed chorus and piano (1999)
