= Robert Xavier Rodriguez =

American classical composer (born 1946)

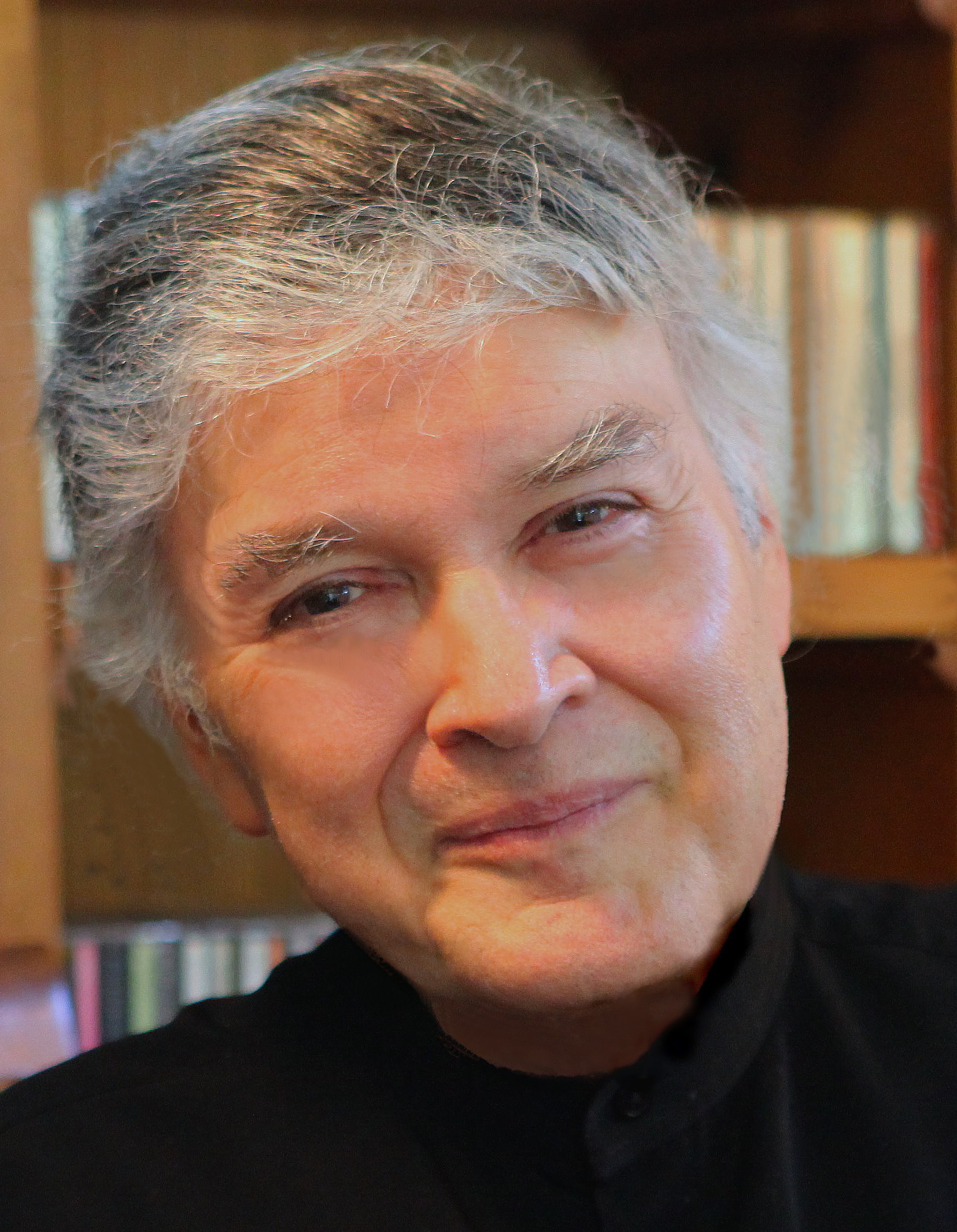
- Born: June 28, 1946 (age 80); San Antonio, Texas
- Occupation: classical composer

Robert Xavier Rodríguez (born June 28, 1946) is an American classical composer, best known for his eight operas and his works for children.

== Life and career ==
Rodríguez received his early musical education in his native San Antonio and in Austin (University of Texas at Austin), Los Angeles (University of Southern California), Lenox (Tanglewood), Fontainebleau (Conservatoire Americain) and Paris. His teachers have included Nadia Boulanger, Jacob Druckman, Bruno Maderna and Elliott Carter. Rodríguez first gained international recognition in 1971, when he was awarded the Prix de Composition Musicale Prince Pierre de Monaco by Prince Rainier and Princess Grace at the Palais Princier in Monte Carlo. Other honors include the Prix Lili Boulanger, a Guggenheim Fellowship, and the Goddard Lieberson Award from the American Academy and Institute of Arts and Letters. Rodríguez has served as Composer-in-Residence with the San Antonio Symphony (1996–99) and the Dallas Symphony (1982, Meet the Composer Orchestra Residency Program). He currently holds the Endowed Chair of University Professor of Music at the University of Texas at Dallas. His music is published by G. Schirmer and is recorded on the Newport, Crystal, Orion, Gasparo, Urtext, ACA Digital, CRI, First Edition, Naxos and Albany labels.

Rodríguez’s music has been performed by conductors such as Sir Neville Marriner, Antal Dorati, Eduardo Mata, and James DePriest.

His works have received orchestral and operatic performances in recent seasons by various organizations, among which include the Vienna Schauspielhaus, he National Opera of Mexico, the New York City Opera, The Toronto Radio Orchestra, The Israel Philharmonic Orchestra, and many others.

== Works ==
=== Opera, theater and dance ===
- La Curandera (2006) - opera (Libretto: Mary Medrick)
- A Midsummer Night’s Dream (2001) - Incidental Music (Text: Shakespeare)
- The Tempest (2000) - Concert Dramatization (Text: Shakespeare)
- The Last Night of Don Juan (2000) - Musical Play (Text: Murray Ross, after Rostand, Zorilla)
- Meta 4 (1994) - Ballet/String Quartet
- Frida (1991, rev. 93) - opera (Libretto: Hillary Blecher, Migdalia Cruz)
- The Old Majestic (1988) - opera (Libretto: Mary Medrick)
- Monkey See, Monkey Do (1986) - opera for children (Libretto: Mary Medrick)
- The Ransom of Red Chief (1986) - opera for children (Libretto: Daniel Dibbern after O. Henry)
- Tango (1985) - opera/theater piece (Text: Newsclippings)
- The Seven Deadly Sins (1984) - Ballet /Wind Ensemble
- Suor Isabella (1982) - opera (Libretto: Daniel Dibbern, after Boccaccio)
- Le Diable Amoureux (1978) - opera (Frans Boerlage, after Cazotte)
- Favola Concertante (1975, rev. 77) - ballet/ concerto for violin, cello and string orchestra

=== Orchestra ===
- Fanfarria Son-Risa (2014)
- De Rerum Natura (2013)
- Canción de los niños (2007) for Children's Chorus and Orchestra
- Agnus Dei for Mozart's Mass in C-Minor (2006) for Soloists and Orchestra
- Musical Dice Game (2005) for Two String Quartets and Two String Orchestras
- Flight (2002) for Narrator and Orchestra (Text: Sukey Smith)
- The Tempest (2000) for Actors and Orchestra (Text: Shakespeare)
- Bachanale: Concertino for Orchestra (1999)
- Las Mañanitas de los Niños (1999)
- Praline and Fudge (1998) for Bass and Chamber Orchestra (Texts: Cookbooks)
- Forbidden Fire (1998) for Bass, Chorus and Orchestra (Texts: Bible, various sources)
- Sinfonia a la Mariachi (1997) for Double Orchestra
- Trilogica (Pinata, Tango di Tango, Hot Buttered Rumba) (1996)
- Hot Buttered Rumba (1996)
- Scrooge (1994) for Bass, Chorus and Orchestra (Text: Dickens)
- Adoracion Ambulante/Fanfare/Con Flor y Canto (1994) for Soloists, Chorus and Orchestra (Text: Bible, Popol Vuh)
- Mascaras (1993) for Cello and Orchestra
- Pinata (1991)
- Ursa (1990) for Contrabass and Orchestra
- A Gathering of Angels: Bolero for Orchestra (1989)
- Invocation of Orpheus (1989) for Trumpet, Harp and Strings
- A Colorful Symphony (1987) for Narrator and Orchestra -Text: Norton Juster (The Phantom Tollbooth)
- We, the People (original title Jargon) (1987) for Narrator, Chorus and Orchestra (Text: Mary Medrick)
- Tango di Tango (1985)
- Varmi'ts! (1985) for Narrator, Chorus and Orchestra (Text: Texas Tall Tales)
- The Seven Deadly Sins (1984) for orchestra (also version for wind ensemble)
- Oktoechos: Concerto Grosso (1983)
- Trunks (1983) for Narrator and Orchestra (Text: Composer)
- Semi-Suite (1981) for Violin and Chamber Orchestra
- Estampie (1981) for Chamber Orchestra
- Transfigurationis Mysteria (1980) for Narrator, Soloists, Chorus and Orchestra (Text: Bible)
- Favola Boccaccesca (1979)
- The Salutation Rag (1978)
- Four Advent Chorale-Preludes by J. S. Bach (arr.1978)for Chorus and Orchestra
- Favola Concertante (1975, rev. 77) for Violin, Cello and String Orchestra
- Sinfonia Concertante (1974) for Soprano Saxophone and Chamber Orchestra
- Concerto III for Piano and Orchestra (1974)
- Canto (1973) for Soprano, Tenor and Chamber Orchestra (Text: Dante, Anonymous French)
- Il Combattimento di Tancredi e Clorinda by Claudio Monteverdi (arr.1973)
- Concert Suite from ‘L’Orfeo’ by Claudio Monteverdi (arr. 1973)
- Concert Suite from ‘L’Incoronazione di Poppea’ by Claudio Monteverdi (arr.1972)
- Lyric Variations (1971) for Oboe and String Orchestra
- Adagio for Small Orchestra (1967)

=== Chamber ===
- Above All, Women: Four Images of Gustav Klimt for String Quartet (2016)
- Alle(...)luia - Variations (1987) for Organ and Chimes
- Apache Wedding Blessing (2006) for Voice and Guitar
- Arabesque by Robert Schumann (arr. RXR, 2010) for 2 Guitars
- As: A Surfeit of Similes for SATB Chorus and Piano Solo (2014)
- Aspen Sketches (1992) for Piano
- Bachanale (1999) for 2 Pianos
- Canto (1982) (It/Fr) for Soprano, Tenor, and Ensemble (Text: Dante and anonymous French)
- Capriccio on the Departure of a Beloved Brother by J.S. Bach (arr. RXR, 1976) for 2, 3 or 4 Guitars
- Caprichos (2012) for Piano Solo
- Chronies (1981) for Bass Clarinet and Percussion
- Cinco Poemas de García Lorca (1975) (Sp) for Mezzo-Soprano, Tenor, and Piano
- Concert Suite from Frida (1993) (En/Sp) for Mezzo-Soprano and Ensemble or Piano (Text: Hillary Blecher, Migdalia Cruz)
- Concert Suite from Suor Isabella (1983) for Soprano and Ensemble (Text: Daniel Dibbern)
- El día de los muertos (2006) for 8 percussionists
- Dolorosa et Lacrimabilis Es, Virgo Maria (1980) for Mixed Chorus, Soprano, Flute, and Windchimes
- The Dot and the Line (2005) for Narrator and Chamber Ensemble (Text: Norton Juster)
- Ductia (1980, rev. 83) for Harp, Harp Duo, Flute and Harp, or other combinations
- Estampie (1981) for Clarinet, Cello, Percussion, and Piano; version for Piano Solo
- Fantasia Lussuriosa (1989) for Piano
- Favola Concertante (1977) for Piano Trio
- Favola I, Episode from Favola Concertante (1977) for Cello
- Favola II, Episodes from Favola Boccaccesca (1980) for Clarinet, Cello, and Piano
- Five Etudes from Oktoechos (1983) 1. for Clarinet and Bassoon, 2. for Trumpet and Trombone, 3. for Piano Solo, 4. for Violin and Percussion, 5. for Cello Solo
- The Food of Love (2004) for Violin/Actor and Piano (Text: William Shakespeare)
- For Piano I and II (1978) for Piano
- Four Poems from ‘Neue Gedichte’ (1971) (Gr) for soprano or tenor and piano (Text: Rainer Maria Rilke)
- Frammenti Musicali (1978) for Flute and Piano or for Piano Solo
- Gambits, Six Chess Pieces (2001) for Horn and Piano or Tuba and Piano
- Improvisation Matrix (1978) for Any Instrument or Combination of Instruments or for Piano Solo or Multiple Pianos
- Invocation of Orpheus (1989) for Trumpet, Harp, and String Quartet or for Trumpet and Piano
- Il Lamento di Tristano (1997) for Flute and Guitar
- Lull-A-Bear from Ursa (1993) for Cello (or Bassoon) and Piano
- Máscaras (1993) for Cello and Chamber Ensemble
- Medieval Suite (1983) from the ballet Estampie for Horn, Violin, and Piano
- Meditation (1981) for Flute, Clarinet, Cello, and Percussion
- Menasherie (2015) for SSA Chorus and Piano Solo
- Meta 4 (1994) Ballet for String Quartet
- A Midsummer Night’s Dream (2001) – Incidental Music for the Shakespeare Play
- Mirror Sonnets (1989) for One, Two or Three Sopranos and Guitar or Piano (Text: Fred Curchack)
- Música, por un tiempo (2008) for B-flat Clarinet, Violin, Cello, and Piano
- My Lady Carey’s Dompe (1985) Variations on an Elizabethan Melody for Piccolo Trumpet, Descant Horn and Keyboard (Harpsichord or Piano)
- Les Niais Amoureux (1989) for Clarinet and Piano Trio
- Omaggio al Divino (2009) for Two Guitars
- Plaisir d’Amour (1982) - after the song by Padre Martini for Flute, Clarinet, and Bassoon
- Praline and Fudge (1979) - Recitative and Aria in Baroque Style for Bass Voice and Piano (Text: from Cookbooks)
- Presences (1973) (Fr) for Soprano or Tenor and Piano (Text: Peter Clothier, trans. by Lucile Golson)
- Quodlibet on Medieval Tunes (1978) for any number of players on any combination of instruments
- The Salutation Rag (1976, rev. 79) for Piano 4-hands
- Semi-Suite (1980) for Piano, 4-hands
- Semi-Suite (1981) for Violin and Piano (plus Clarinet and Percussion ad lib)
- Seven Deadly Sequences (1990) for Piano
- Six Episodes from The Ransom of Red Chief (1987) for Piano
- Six Maxims de La Rochefoucauld (1991) (Fr) for Voice and Piano
- Six Songs of E.E. Cummings (2008) for Soprano and Marimba or Soprano and Piano
- Son Risa (2006) for Solo Harp
- Sonata in One Movement (1973) for Soprano Saxophone (or Clarinet) and Piano
- Sonatina d’Estate (1982) for Flute and Piano
- The Song of Songs (Shir Hashirim) (1992) for Soprano, Narrator, and Ensemble (Text: Sholom Aleichem [trans. by Curt Leviant] and the Bible)
- Sor(tri)lège: Trio III (2007) for Piano Trio
- Tango (1985) for Tenor and Chamber Ensemble (Libretto (En) by the Composer from 1913-14 news clippings)
- Tango di Tango (1985) for Violin, Accordion and Piano or for Piano Solo
- Tango Sueño (1986), Lullaby for Piano
- Tentado por la samba (2007) for Cello and Piano
- Three Lullabies (1990) for Piano or Guitar (transcribed for guitar by Enric Madriguera)
- Three Songs and A Monologue from As You Like It (1990) for Voice and Piano
- Toccata for Guitar Quartet (1976)
- Toccata for Guitar Solo (1983) (transcribed by Robert Guthrie)
- Toccata for Percussion Quintet (1977)
- Trio I (1971) for Piano Trio
- Trio II (1970) for Piano Trio
- The Versatility Rag (2006) for Piano Solo
- Xochiquetzal (2014) for Violin and Percussion Sextet
- Xochiquetzal (2015) for Violin and Piano

== Recordings ==
- Remembranzas de mi Guitarra / Tango Amor, Three Lullabies - Enric Madriguera, Guitar; Albany, TROY 1600
- Música, por un tiempo: SOLI Chamber Ensemble/Música, por un tiempo - SOLI; Albany, TROY 1505
- Robert Xavier Rodríguez: Works for Piano / Caprichos, Fantasia Lussuriosa, Estampie, Seven Deadly Sequences, Semi-Suite, Hot Buttered Rumba - Jeff Lankov, Piano; Albany, TROY 1477
- Robert Xavier Rodriguez: Complete Works for Cello and Piano / Tentado por la samba, Máscaras, Ursa, Favola I, Lull-A-Bear - Jesus Castro-Balbi, Cello and Gloria Lin, Piano; Albany, TROY 1355
- Chamber Works / Meta 4, Trio III: Sor(tri)lege, Trio II, Trio I - Colorado Quartet, Clavier Trio, Voices of Change. Albany, TROY 1136
- American Music for Percussion 1 / El día de los muertos - New England Conservatory Percussion Ensemble; Frank Epstein, Conductor; Naxos 8.559683
- Robert Xavier Rodríguez: Works for Chorus & Orchestra / Forbidden Fire, Con Flor y Canto, Scrooge - George Cordes, Baritone; Rodney Nolan, Tenor; University of Miami Symphony Orchestra and Chorus; Miami Children's Chorus; Thomas M. Sleeper, Conductor. Albany, TROY 430
- Robert Xavier Rodríguez: Meet the Composer Recording / Oktoechos – Dallas Symphony Orchestra; Eduardo Mata, Conductor / Favola Boccaccesca – Louisville Orchestra; Lawrence Leighton Smith, Conductor / The Song of Songs – Voices of Change, Irene Gubrud, Soprano; Fred Curchack, Actor; Robert Xavier Rodríguez, Conductor. First Edition, FECD-0027
- Musical Theater Works/ Tango – Rafael Alvarez, Tenor / Concert Suite from Frida – Angelina Réaux, Soprano; Voices of Change; Robert Xavier Rodríguez, Conductor CRI, CD824
- Voces Americanas: Works by Robert Xavier Rodriguez, Mario Lavista, Roberto Sierra, Mario Davidovsky, Tania Leon./ Les Niais Amoureux - Emanuel Borok, Violin; Ross Powell, Clarinet; Christopher Adkins, Cello; Jo Boatright, Piano; Voices of Change. CRI 773. (Nominated for the 1999 Grammy Award for "Best Small Ensemble Performance".)
- Celebration Of Flight: Works by William Bolcom, Steven Winteregg, Michael Schelle, and Robert Xavier Rodríguez / Flight - Allison Janney, narrator; Dayton Philharmonic; Neal Gittleman, conductor. Albany, TROY 672
- Laugh, Regardless of Creed : Works of Louis Gruenberg, Alla Borzova, Robert Xavier Rodríguez and Larry Alan Smith / Tango – Paul Sperry, Tenor; Members of the San Diego Symphony Orchestra; Robert Xavier Rodríguez, Conductor. Albany, TROY 740
- American Music for Percussion 1 / El día de los muertos - New England Conservatory Percussion Ensemble; Frank Epstein, Conductor; Naxos 8.559683
- Le Grand Tango: Works of Astor Piazzolla, Alberto Ginastera, Heitor Villa-Lobos, Federico Ibarra, Robert Xavier Rodríguez and Manuel Enríquez / Lull-A-Bear - Carlos Prieto, Cello; Edison Quintana, Piano. Urtext, JBCC014
- American Contemporary Chamber Music: Works of William Kraft, Robert Xavier Rodríguez, Larry Alan Smith and Dan Welcher / Chronies, Meditation - Voices of Change. Crystal, CD704
- Rachmaninov Suites / Bachanale (version for two pianos) - Miwako Takeda & Nobuhito Nakai, Pianos; Pro Arte Musicae, 2008.9.27
- Encantamiento / Son Risa - Elisabeth Remy Johnson, Harp; ACA Digital, CM20103
- I Loved Lucy / Il Lamento di Tristano - Susan DeJong, Flute; Jeffrey Van, Guitar; Duologue. Gasparo, GSCD-348
- Americans in Paris / Six Maxims de la Rochefoucauld - Hillary Hight Daw, Soprano; Barbara Elfrid, Piano. ACA Digital
- Seven World Premieres / Tentado por la samba - Carlos Prieto, Cello; Doris Stephenson, Piano. Urtext, JBCC 183
