= Lumiere Records =

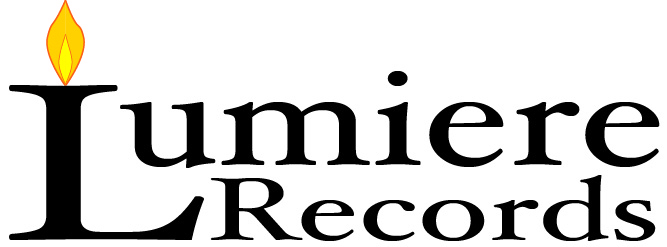
- Founded: 2006
- Founder: Victoria Paterson; Robert Paterson
- Distributor: Naxos Records
- Genre: Classical
- Country of origin: U.S.
- Location: New York City
- Official website: www.lumiererecords.com

Lumiere Records is an American record label that concentrates on classical music with crossover appeal and pop arrangements by classical ensembles such as string quartets. The label was established by Victoria Paterson in 2006 and is based in New York City. Lumiere is distributed through Naxos of America, a division of Naxos Records.

== History ==
Lumiere Records was founded in 2006 by Victoria Paterson as a boutique label specializing in classical crossover recordings, such as music for weddings, relaxation music, and holiday music such as Christmas albums. Lumiere Records is also associated with American Modern Recordings, a subsidiary label that focuses on music by living composers, and in particular, music by American composers.

As of July 2015, Lumiere Records has released eight albums: six feature the Lumiere String Quartet, the house band for Lumiere Records, an album entitled Le Petit Mort is by the Lumiere Duo (violin and cello), and another album entitled String Quartet Wedding Music is by an unnamed string quartet. Music from Lumiere Records recordings has been used in two feature films to date: The Social Network and The Loft.

After releasing the Classical Wedding Music album, Lumiere Records founder Victoria Paterson decided to release an album entitled Divorce Music. This album contains transcriptions and arrangements of famous "break up" pop songs such as "These Boots Are Made for Walkin'", "D-I-V-O-R-C-E", and "50 Ways to Leave Your Lover", as well as traditional wedding pieces, but geared toward break-ups and divorce. While with her husband, "On the stroll in the park, they decided – purely as a goof, she insists – to do the opposite of Classical Wedding Music." Paterson's husband, composer Robert Paterson, arranged many classical wedding pieces and most of the other tracks for the album. Pachelbel's Canon in D became "Pachelbel's Canon in D(ivorce)", Mendelssohn's A Midsummer Night's Dream became "Midsummer Nightmare", The "Ode to Joy" theme from Beethoven's Symphony No. 9 became "Ode to Sorrow", and so on.

== See also ==
- List of record labels
