= Glen Campbell in Concert with the South Dakota Symphony =

Live album by Glen Campbell
- Released: 2001
- Recorded: 2001, The Washington Pavilion of Arts and Sciences, Sioux Falls, South Dakota
- Genre: Country
- Label: Columbia River
- Producer: Tom David, T.J. Kuenster

Glen Campbell chronology
A Glen Campbell Christmas (1999)	Glen Campbell in Concert with the South Dakota Symphony (2001)	Love Is the Answer: 24 Songs of Faith, Hope and Love (2004)

Glen Campbell in Concert with the South Dakota Symphony is the fifty-eighth album by American singer Glen Campbell, released in 2001. The album was recorded during a two-night show, January 10 and 11, 2001, at the Washington Pavilion, Sioux Falls, South Dakota, where he was accompanied by his daughter Debby Campbell, and the South Dakota Symphony Orchestra.

It was also later broadcast on March 5, 2001, for the PBS special "Glen Campbell – In Concert". The set list included songs from when he was a studio-session picker to his solo career hits and from his time on the television show The Glen Campbell Goodtime Hour. The concert was released on video, CD and DVD. In a behind the scenes moment from the concert, Campbell said he "loved playing with big orchestras, it brings something out, everything is so full and lush, and it actually makes me sing better".

== Track listing ==
1. "Wichita Lineman" (Jimmy Webb) – 3:50
2. "Gentle on My Mind" (John Hartford) – 2:46
3. "Dreams of the Everyday Housewife" (Chris Gantry) – 2:27
4. "Highwayman" (Jimmy Webb) – 3:01
5. "By the Time I Get to Phoenix" (Jimmy Webb) – 3:06
6. "Classical Gas" (Mason Williams) – 3:04
7. "It's Only Make Believe" (Conway Twitty, Jack Nance) – 2:29
8. "Little Green Apples" (Robert L. Russell) – 3:28 (duet with Debby Campbell)
9. "Southern Nights" (Allen Toussaint) – 3:01
10. "Rhinestone Cowboy" (Larry Weiss) – 3:05
11. "Galveston" (Jimmy Webb) – 4:00
12. "Since I Fell for You" (Woodrow Johnson) – 2:52
13. "The Moon Is a Harsh Mistress" (Jimmy Webb) – 3:03
14. "William Tell Overture" (Gioachino Rossini, arr. by Glen Campbell, Dennis McCarthy) – 2:49
15. "True Grit (song)" (Don Black, Elmer Bernstein) – 2:58
16. "Still Within the Sound of My Voice" (Jimmy Webb) – 4:00
17. "Amazing Grace" (John Newton) – 3:13
18. "Try a Little Kindness" (Bobby Austin, Thomas Sapaugh) – 4:57
19. "Don't Pull Your Love/Then You Can Tell Me Goodbye" (Lambert, Brian Potter) – 3:18
20. "Time in a Bottle" (Jim Croce) – 2:28
21. "Let It Be Me" (Gilbert Bécaud, Manny Kurtz, Pierce Leroyer) – 2:16 (duet with Debby Campbell)
22. "MacArthur Park" (Jimmy Webb) – 7:34

== Personnel ==
- Glen Campbell – vocals, acoustic guitar, electric guitar, bag pipes (Amazing Grace)
- Debby Campbell – vocals
- Gary Bruzesse – vocals, drums
- Jeff Dayton – vocals, acoustic guitar, electric guitar
- Noel Kirkland – vocals, fiddle, banjo, acoustic guitar, keyboards
- T.J. Kuenster – musical director, vocals, keyboards
- Kenny Skaggs – vocals, acoustic guitar, steel guitar, dobro, mandolin
- Russ Skaggs – vocals, bass guitar
- The South Dakota Symphony

== Production ==
- Executive producer – Glen Campbell, Martin Fischer
- Producer – Tom David, T.J. Kuenster
- Music director/conductor – T.J. Kuenster
- Recorder- Tom David, Greg Lankford
- Mixed by Steve Johnson, Tom Davis
- Editor - Andreas C.Kouris
- Remote facilities provided by TNN
- Productions in Nashville, TN
- Recorded for the PBS special "Glen Campbell – In Concert" by High Five Television
