= The Wind in High Places =

Musical composition by John Luther Adams

The Wind in High Places is a composition for string quartet by the American composer John Luther Adams.

== Composition ==
The Wind in High Places has a duration of roughly 16 minutes and is composed in three movements:

1. Above Sunset Pass
2. Maclaren Summit
3. Looking Toward Hope

The composition was developed from the 2007 piece Three High Places for solo violin, which Adams composed in memory of his friend and collaborator Gordon Wright. The piece uses only natural harmonics and open strings.

== Reception ==
The Wind in High Places has been praised by music critics. Pwyll ap Siôn of Gramophone wrote:

Adams makes extensive use of natural harmonics here, especially during the work's middle movement, 'Maclaren Summit', where he gradually builds up a complex four-part canon. The effect is – quite literally – breathtaking, aided in no small measure by the JACK Quartet's precise performance. By contrast, the first and last movements present a more reserved panoramic 'sweep', suggesting the wide-open spaces of the Alaskan landscape.

The piece was also lauded by John von Rhein of the Chicago Tribune, who remarked, "There is no real development here, no musical ideas in a conventional sense. Softly undulating strings and open fifths become the aural equivalent of daylight breaking over the rocky Alaskan peaks." He added, "Could any new music be more delicately sparse, more wonderfully poetic? I think not..."

== Recording ==
A recording of The Wind in High Places performed by the JACK Quartet was released on January 13, 2015, through Cold Blue Music. This recording was later named one of the best classical music recordings of 2015 by Corinna da Fonseca-Wollheim of The New York Times.
