= La Curandera =

Opera by Robert Xavier Rodriguez

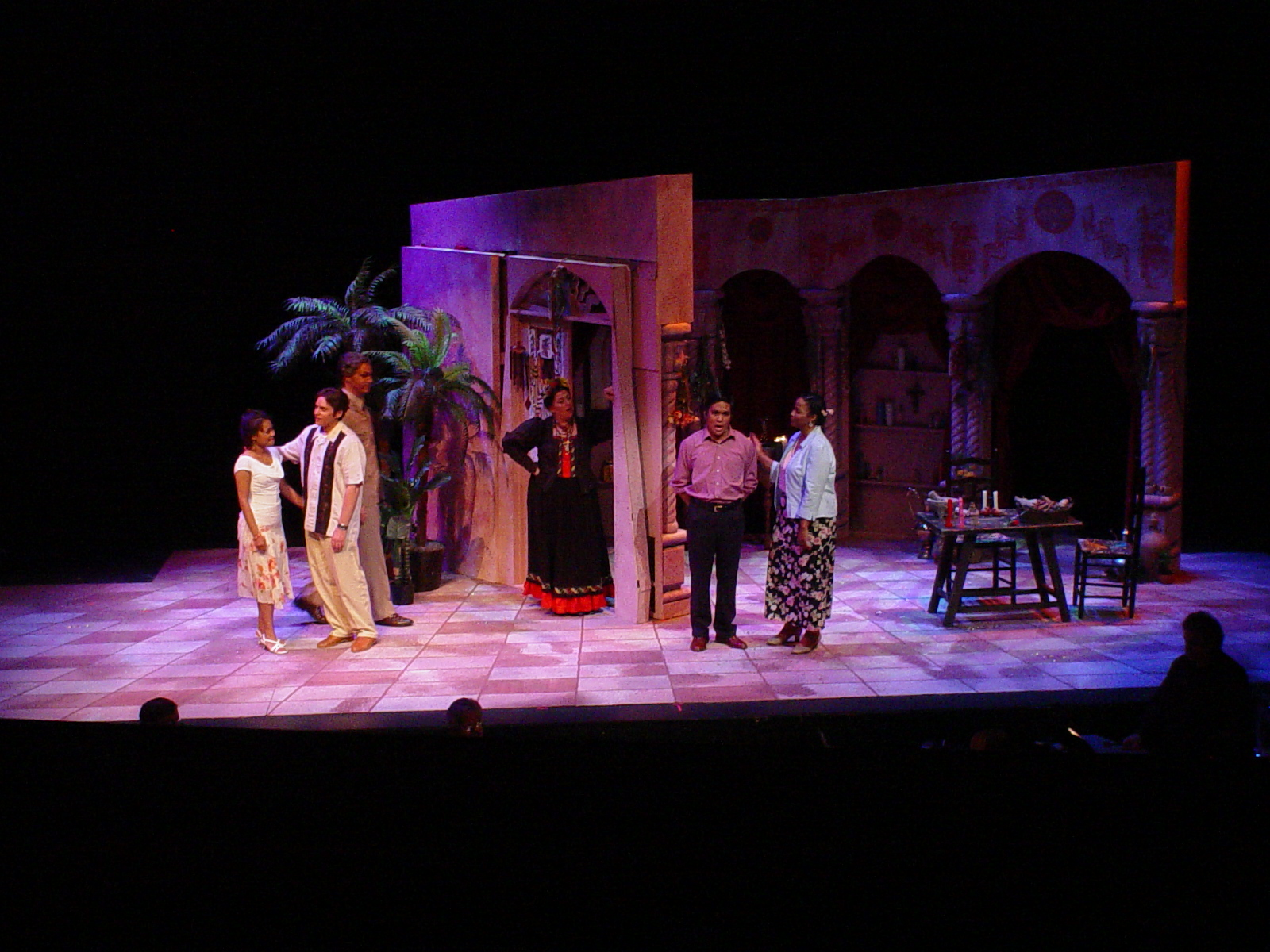
Exterior and interior scene

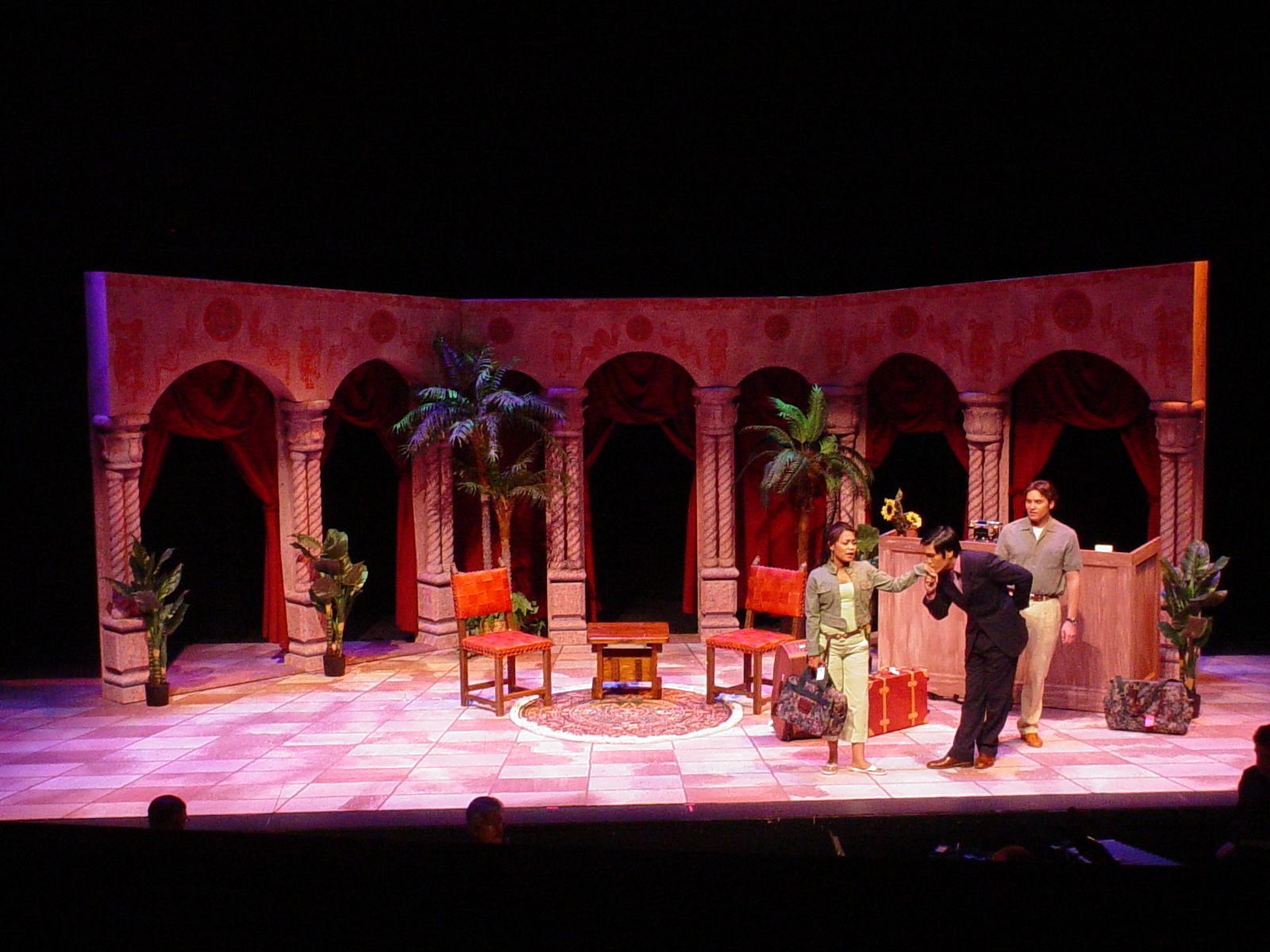
Interior Lobby of hotel

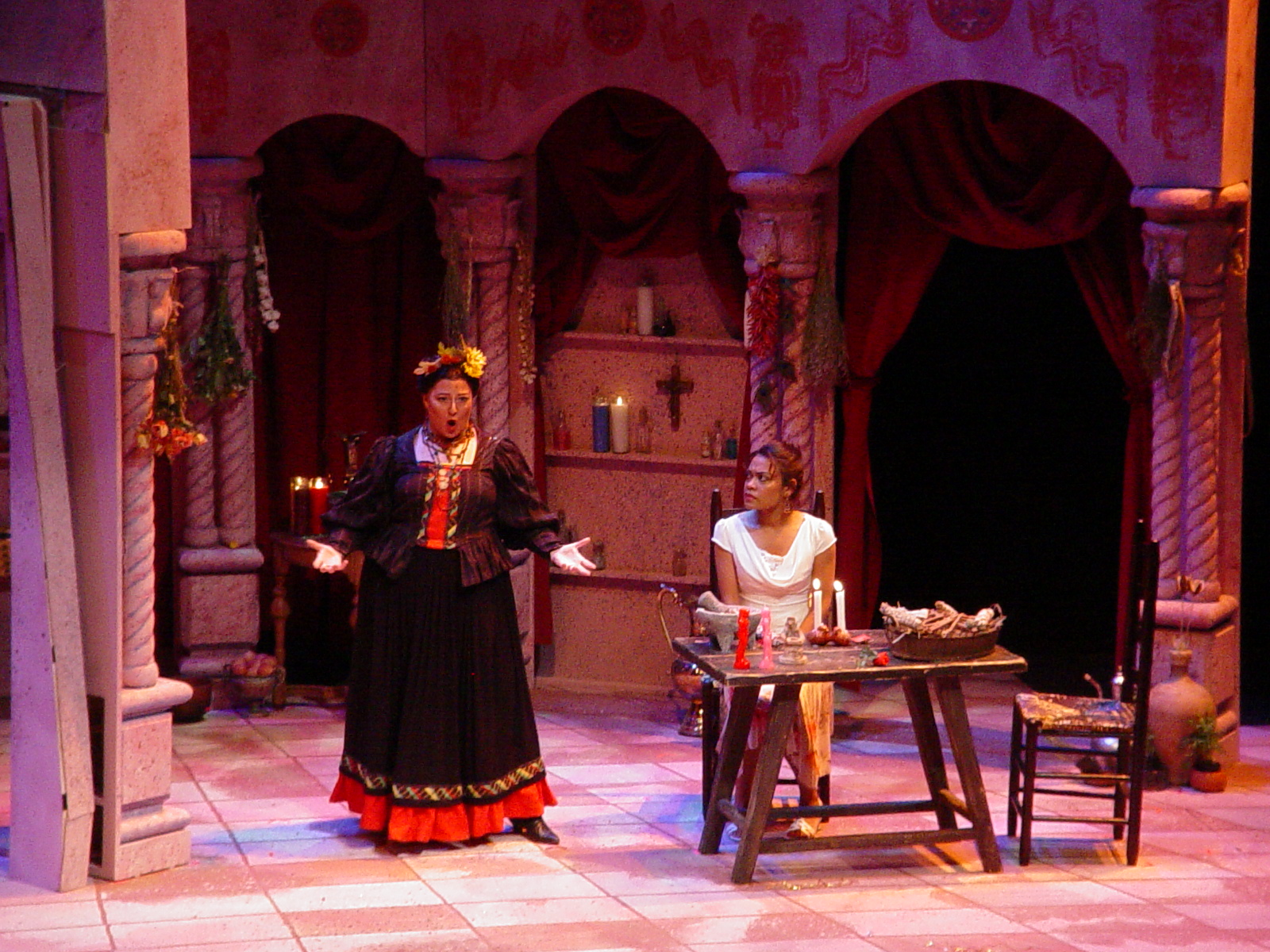
in house

La Curandera is an opera composed by Robert Xavier Rodriguez to a primarily English libretto by Mary Medrick. It was commissioned and premiered by Opera Colorado in April 2006.
