= Gillian Maitland =

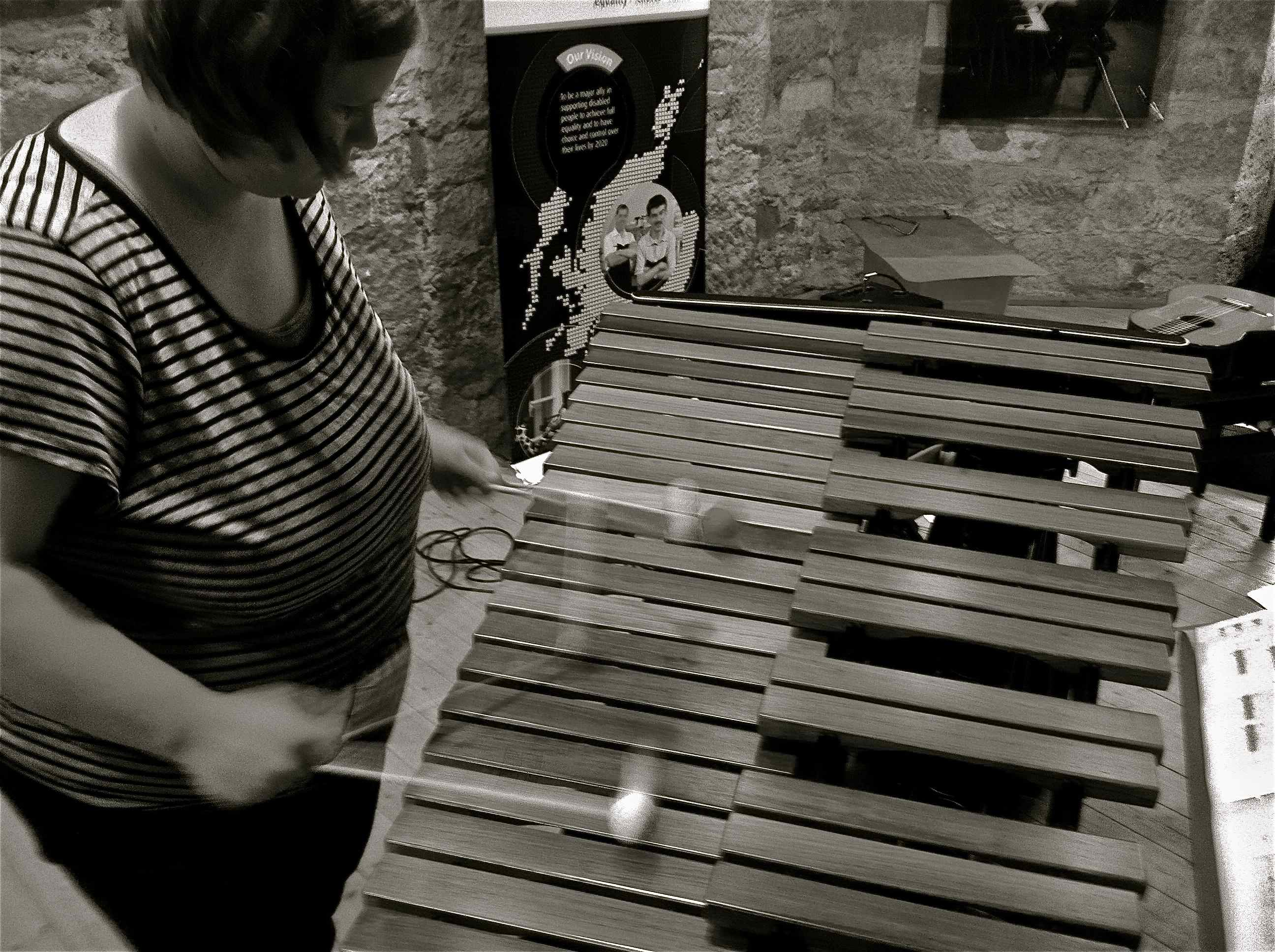
- Gillian Maitland performing in 2010

Background information
- Born: 26 September 1985 (age 40); Dundee, Scotland
- Genres: Classical, light contemporary
- Occupation(s): Marimba and Vibraphone soloist, percussionist, composer, educator, public speaker
- Years active: 2009–present
- Website: www.gillianmaitland.co.uk

Gillian Maitland (born 26 September 1985) is a Scottish marimba soloist, percussionist and composer.

== Early life ==
Maitland's musical life began when she started drum kit lessons at the age of 12. She quickly progressed, adding piano and saxophone to the mix. When she was 16, she was accepted to the prestigious St Mary's Music School in Edinburgh as their first ever percussionist where the school build a soundproofed percussion room especially. Here she had her first opportunity to study the marimba, where she advanced very quickly. In her time at St Mary's Music School, Maitland attended elite courses including Juilliard Summer Percussion Seminar, National Youth Orchestra of Scotland and Edinburgh Youth Orchestra, as well as winning many music competitions and awards for her exceptional abilities on the marimba.

Throughout Maitland's education, she has racked up some single and long term lessons with some of the world's most renowned percussionists. These include Dame Evelyn Glennie, Ney Rosauro, Kai Stensgaard, Joseph Gramley, Janis Potter, Nick Petrella as well as members of the percussion section of the New York Philharmonic.

In 2005, after performing marimba to the G8 Wives at Glamis Castle and winning the award of Angus Youth Ambassador, Maitland won an exceptional £80,000 grant from the Donald Dewar Arts Awards to study with the world-renowned Ney Rosauro at the University of Miami Frost School of music. In September 2007, in her third year of studies, she was involved in a road traffic accident resulting in her left leg becoming permanently paralysed below the knee. Maitland had to return to her native Scotland to learn to walk again, with the use of an ankle foot orthotic brace. Unfortunately, due to the length of her recovery, Maitland was not able to finish her degree.

== Career ==
Following her long recovery process, Maitland gained the funding to purchase a five-octave marimba in 2009, when she also became an official Encore Mallets Endorser. Maitland then went on to perform for Prince Charles at the 20th anniversary of Prince's Scottish Youth Business Trust.

Maitland released her debut album 'Plocanan' in 2014. The album features both marimba and vibraphone and includes both works by Debussy and Bach, as well as contemporary. The album also has the premier recording of Robert Paterson (composer)'s 'Merry Go Round' which is a 6-mallet solo published in 1990.

In 2015, Maitland took on the roll of Head of Kingdom Percussion Academy, part of Kingdom Youth Brass Initiative where students are taught solo, ensemble and group percussion on professional equipment not commonly available in Scotland. She is also the Head of Percussion for Kingdom Championship Brass Band, based in Cowdenbeath, Fife.

Along with performing, Maitland is also a composer and arranger of percussion music published by Southern Percussion.

== Albums ==
- Plocanan (2014)
