= Become Desert =

2017 composition by John Luther Adams

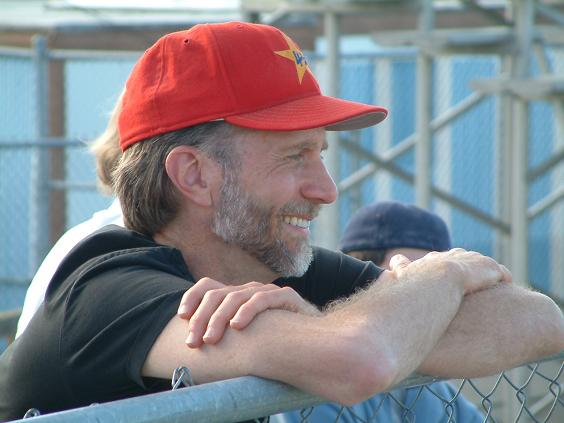
Composer John Luther Adams

Become Desert is a composition for choir and orchestra written in 2017 by the American composer John Luther Adams. The work was commissioned by the New York Philharmonic and the Seattle Symphony with co-commissions from the San Diego Symphony and the Rotterdam Philharmonic Orchestra. Its world premiere was given by the Seattle Symphony conducted by Ludovic Morlot on March 29, 2018. Become Desert is the third part of a musical trilogy, following Adams's Become River (2010) and the Pulitzer Prize for Music-winning Become Ocean (2014).

== Composition ==
Become Desert is written in one continuous movement and lasts approximately 40 minutes.

=== Background ===
Become Desert was composed following Adams's move from his longtime residence in Alaska to the Sonoran Desert in Mexico. In the score program note, Adams wrote, "I used to say that if I ever left the tundra it would be for the desert. Now, some forty years after first coming to Alaska, I've finally made that move. As I've begun to learn the landforms, the light, the weather, the plants and the birds, I've dreamed of music that echoes this extraordinary landscape."

Having witnessed firsthand the effects of anthropogenic climate change in the Arctic Alaska, the composer found himself ruminating on a quote from François-René de Chateaubriand that became a motivation for the piece: "Forests precede civilizations, and deserts follow." He thus described the piece as "a celebration of the deserts we are given, and a lamentation of the deserts we create."

=== Instrumentation ===
The work is scored for SATB chorus and a large orchestra consisting of four flutes, four oboes, four clarinets, four bassoons, eight horns, four trumpets, four trombones, four percussionists, four harps, and strings. The performers are further divided into five groups that surround the audience.

== Reception ==
Become Desert has been highly praised by music critics. Reviewing the world premiere performance, Thomas May of The Seattle Times described the work as "a profoundly original creation that puts the listener right inside the music as it unfolds. It's an experience that simply can't be replicated outside live performance, its uniqueness an antidote to the noisy stream of infinitely repeatable data in 21st-century digital culture."

Seth Colter Walls of The New York Times said it was "packed with moments of drama in microcosm. Over a nearly 40-minute span, those slight twists combine to create a new route toward a grand impact. Precisely because the two are so distinct in method, Desert came across as a thoroughly worthy successor to [Become] Ocean."

Tom Huizenga of NPR wrote that the piece "shimmers in majestic stillness," adding, "Through intricate orchestration, Adams conjures glistening shafts of light, distant rolling thunder and flickering colors refracting in the haze of desert heat. The closer one listens to this 40-minute mirage, more is revealed, perhaps even something close to enlightenment." Andrew Clements of The Guardian further remarked:

Where its predecessor evokes the unstoppable energy of the ocean, creating a slowly accumulating arc of sound that's sometimes joyous, sometimes apocalyptic, Become Desert is more static and seamless, not so elemental. It's woven from luminous textures that seem to be illuminated and transformed from within but which, despite the huge climaxes they generate, often feel as if they could evaporate at any moment. This is a very different orchestral journey from Adams's previous masterpiece, but one that's just as rewarding in this superb, beautifully recorded performance.

== Recording ==
A recording of Become Desert performed by the Seattle Symphony conducted by Morlot was released through Cantaloupe Music on June 14, 2019.
