= Perry Townsend =

American composer and pianist

Perry Townsend is an American composer and pianist based in New York City. Townsend's debut CD, No Suggestion of Silence, released in August 2001 by Capstone Records, contains choral, piano, and orchestral pieces. Growing up in Raleigh, North Carolina he began composing at a young age and sang for many years in the Raleigh Boy Choir directed by Thomas Sibley.
