= South Dakota Symphony Orchestra =

Orchestra in South Dakota, United States

The South Dakota Symphony Orchestra (SDSO) is an American orchestra located in Sioux Falls, South Dakota. The SDSO gives its concerts principally in the Washington Pavilion of Arts and Science in downtown Sioux Falls. The official anthem of the SDSO is Alleluias for Orchestra, written by South Dakota composer Stephen Yarbrough.

== History ==
The SDSO was founded in 1922 at Augustana College. The SDSO performed concerts at the Sioux Falls Auditorium until the building collapsed in 1994.

Henry Charles Smith III was music director of the SDSO from 1989 to 2001, and subsequently held the title of conductor emeritus of the SDSO. Susan Haig became music director of the SDSO as of the 2001/2002 season, the first female conductor to hold this post. Haig resigned as SDSO music director in November 2002 with immediate effect, following disputes with the orchestra's board.

Delta David Gier became music director of the SDSO as of the 2004/2005 season. During Gier's tenure, the SDSO has hosted composer residencies with Paul Moravec and Steven Stucky, and initiated the Lakota Music Project, a collaboration between Native American musicians and the SDSO. By 2007, the SDSO's endowment had reached $2.2M USD, a 28-fold growth since 1998.

Following a 2022 profile of the SDSO by Alex Ross in The New Yorker, Rosemarie Buntrock and Dean Buntrock made the then-largest donation to the orchestra in its history, of $2M USD. The orchestra announced its intentions to use this donation principally to continue support for the Lakota Music Project and to research the 1951 opera Giants in the Earth by Douglas Moore. Following preparation of a new performing edition in April 2025, the SDSO gave the first live performance of the opera since 1974. The SDSO and Gier have commercially recorded music of John Luther Adams.

== Music directors (partial list) ==
- Henry Charles Smith III (1989–2001)
- Susan Haig (2001–2002)
- Delta David Gier (2004–present)

== See also ==
- Glen Campbell in Concert with the South Dakota Symphony
