= John Luther Adams =

American composer (born 1953)

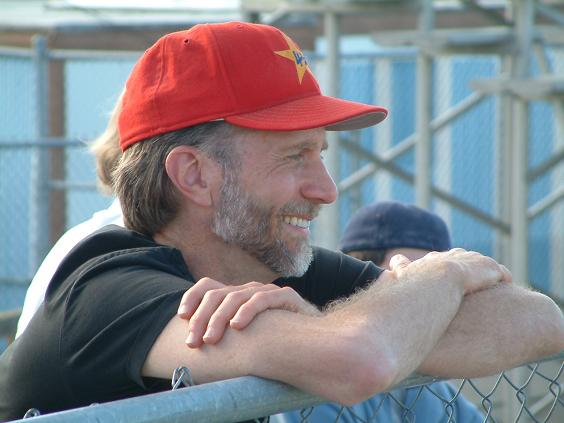
John Luther Adams

John Luther Adams (born January 23, 1953) is an American composer. His history of environmental activism informs his music. His orchestral work Become Ocean was awarded the 2014 Pulitzer Prize for Music.

== Early life ==
Born in Meridian, Mississippi, Adams began playing music as a teenager as a drummer in rock bands. He attended the California Institute of the Arts as an undergraduate in the early 1970s, studying with James Tenney and Leonard Stein, and graduated in 1973. After graduating, Adams began work in environmental protection, and through this work Adams first travelled to Alaska in 1975. Adams moved to Alaska in 1978 and lived there until 2014. He subsequently divided his time between New York and the Sonoran desert in Mexico, though his time in Alaska continues to be a prominent influence in his music. From 1982 to 1989, he performed as timpanist and principal percussionist with the Fairbanks Symphony Orchestra and the Arctic Chamber Orchestra. Since January 2024, Adams and his wife now reside in Australia.

== Career ==
Adams's composition work spans many genres and media. He has composed for television, film, children's theater, voice, acoustic instruments, orchestra, and electronics. Early in his career, Adams was influenced by the music and writings of Frank Zappa, whose enthusiasm for Edgard Varèse intrigued Adams. Through his careful listening to Varèse, Adams developed an interest in and was influenced by the music of John Cage and Karlheinz Stockhausen, among others. From 1998 to 2002, Adams served as associate professor of composition at Oberlin Conservatory of Music.

=== Influence of nature ===
Adams has described his music as, "... profoundly influenced by the natural world and a strong sense of place. Through sustained listening to the subtle resonances of the northern soundscape, I hope to explore the territory of sonic geography—that region between place and culture...between environment and imagination".

His love of nature, concern for the environment and interest in the resonance of specific places led him to pursue the concept of sonic geography. Early examples of this idea include two works written during Adams's sojourn in rural Georgia: Songbirdsongs (1974–80), a collection of indeterminate miniature pieces for piccolos and percussion based on free translations of bird songs, and Night Peace (1977), a vocal work capturing the nocturnal soundscape of the Okefenokee Swamp through slow-changing and sparse sonic textures.

His work, Sila: The Breath of the World, represents the "air element", following the representation of water in Become Ocean and the "earth element" in Inuksuit, an outdoor percussion piece. His music, he says, is "our awareness of the world in which we live and the world's awareness of us".

His more recent works include, Across the Distance, for a large number of horns, was premiered on the 5th of July, 2015 at the Cambo estate in Fife, Scotland as part of the East Neuk Festival. His recording of Ilimaq ("spirit journeys"), a solo work for percussion, played by art-music percussionist, composer, and Wilco drummer Glenn Kotche, was released in October 2015. A combination of contemporary classical music, Alaskan field recordings, and found sounds from the natural world, it evokes the travels of a shaman riding the sound of a drum to and from the spirit world.

== Awards and honors ==
In 2014 Adams won the Pulitzer Prize for Music for his orchestral piece Become Ocean, which Alex Ross of The New Yorker called "the loveliest apocalypse in musical history". It was premiered in 2013 by Ludovic Morlot and the Seattle Symphony and performed by the same conductor and orchestra at the 2014 Spring For Music music festival at Carnegie Hall. Adams had never been to Carnegie Hall before hearing his work played there to a sold-out house. The surround-sound recording of Become Ocean on Cantaloupe Music debuted at No. 1 on the Billboard Traditional Classical Chart, stayed there for two straight weeks, and went on to win the Grammy Award for Best Contemporary Classical Composition. All his works are published by Taiga Press (BMI) and available from Theodore Front Musical Literature n.d..

In October 2015, Adams received the William Schuman Award from Columbia University. The events surrounding the award included a series of concerts of his music at the Miller Theater, including Clouds of Forgetting, Clouds of Unknowing, For Lou Harrison, and In the White Silence.

- On February 8, 2015, Adams was awarded a GRAMMY in the category Best Contemporary Classical Composition for his Become Ocean.
- In November 2014, Adams was named the Musical America 2015 Composer of the Year.
- Adams was the recipient of the 2010 Nemmers Prize in Music Composition. He was cited by the selection committee for melding the physical and musical worlds into a unique artistic vision that transcends stylistic boundaries.
- The Callithumpian Consort's recording of Adams' Four Thousand Holes was noted as one of The New Yorker's Best Classical Recordings of 2011.
- In 2012, he received the 17th Annual Heinz Award with a special focus on the environment.
- In 2006, Adams was named one of the first United States Artists Fellows. He has received awards and fellowships from the National Endowment for the Arts, the Rockefeller Foundation, the Rasmuson Foundation, and the Foundation for Contemporary Arts.
- Adams received a 1993 Foundation for Contemporary Arts Grants to Artists Award.

== List of works ==
- Green Corn Dance (1974) for percussion ensemble
- Night Peace (1976) for antiphonal choirs, solo soprano, harp, and percussion
- songbirdsongs (1974–80) for 2 piccolos and 3 percussion
- Strange Birds Passing (1983) for flute choir
- up into the silence (1978/84) (poem by E. E. Cummings) for voice and piano
- How the Sun Came to the Forest (1984) (poem by John Haines) for chorus and alto flute, English horn, percussion, harp, and strings
- The Far Country of Sleep (1988) for orchestra
- Giving Birth to Thunder, Sleeping With His Daughter, Coyote Builds North America (1986–90) for theater
- magic song for one who wishes to live and the dead who climb up to the sky (1990) for voice and piano
- Dream in White-on-White (1992) for orchestra
- Earth and the Great Weather (1990–93) for theater, libretto published in the book "Inukshuk" edited by ARBOS – Company for Music & Theater, Vienna 1999, ISBN 3-85266-126-9
- Five Yup'ik Dances (1991–94) for solo harp
- Crow and Weasel (1993–94) (story by Barry Lopez) for theater
- Sauyatugvik: the Time of Drumming (1995) for orchestra
- Clouds of Forgetting, Clouds of Unknowing (1991–95) for orchestra
- Sauyatugvik: The Time of Drumming (1996) version for 2 pianos, timpani, and 4 percussion
- Five Athabascan Dances (1992/96) for harp and percussion
- Strange and Sacred Noise (1991–97) for percussion quartet
- Make Prayers to the Raven (1996/98) flute, violin, harp, cello, and percussion
- In the White Silence (1998) for orchestra
- Qilyaun (1998) for four bass drums
- Time Undisturbed (1999) for 3 shakuhachis, 3 kotos, and shō
- In a Treeless Place, Only Snow (1999) for celesta, harp, 2 vibraphones, and string quartet
- The Light That Fills the World (1999–2000) for orchestra
- Among Red Mountains (2001) for solo piano
- The Immeasurable Space of Tones (1998–2001) for violin, vibraphone, piano, sustaining keyboard, contrabass instrument
- The Farthest Place (2001) for violin, vibraphone, marimba, piano, double bass
- After the Light (2001) for alto flute, vibraphone, harp
- Dark Wind (2001) for bass clarinet, vibraphone, marimba, piano
- Red Arc/Blue Veil (2002) for piano, mallet percussion, and processed sounds
- The Mathematics of Resonant Bodies (2002) for solo percussion and processed sounds
- Poem of the Forgotten (2004) (poem by John Haines) for voice and piano
- for Lou Harrison (2004, premiere 2005) for string quartet, string orchestra, and 2 pianos
- ...and bells remembered... (2005) for bowed crotales, orchestra bells, chimes, vibraphone and bowed vibraphone
- for Jim (rising) (2006) for three trumpets and three trombones
- Always Very Soft (2007) for percussion trio
- Dark Waves (2007) for orchestra and electronic sounds
- Little Cosmic Dust Poem (2007) for voice (medium) and piano
- Nunataks (Solitary Peaks) (2007) for solo piano
- Three High Places (2007) for solo violin
- The Light Within (2007) for alto flute, bass clarinet, vibraphone/crotales, piano, violin, cello and electronic sounds
- Sky with Four Suns and Sky with Four Moons (2008) for four choirs
- the place we began (2008) four electro-acoustic soundscapes
- Inuksuit (2009) for nine to ninety-nine percussion
- Four Thousand Holes (2010) for piano, percussion, and electronic sounds
- The Wind in High Places (2011) for string quartet
- I L I M A Q (2012), a drum-kit opera, premiered at the University of Texas at Austin, performed by Glenn Kotche
- Become Ocean (2013) for orchestra, premiered at the Seattle Symphony, June 20, 2013, conducted by Ludovic Morlot
- Become River (2013) for chamber orchestra, premiered by the Saint Paul Chamber Orchestra, April 3, 2014, conducted by Steven Schick
- Ten Thousand Birds (2014) for chamber orchestra, premiered by Alarm Will Sound, October 19, 2014
- Sila: The Breath of the World (2014) for choir, percussion, strings, brass, and woodwinds premiered at the Mostly Mozart Festival at Lincoln Center, July 25, 2014, led by Doug Perkins
- Across the Distance (2015) for horns in multiples of 8, premiered at the East Neuk Festival at the Cambo estate, July 5, 2015, led by Alec Frank-Gemmill
- untouched (2015) for string quartet, commissioned by the University of North Carolina for Brooklyn Rider
- Canticles of the Holy Wind (2013) for four choirs (SATB) and solo voices, with percussion, commissioned by The Crossing and others, premiered at the Metropolitan Museum of Art, October 29, 2016
- Everything That Rises (2017) for string quartet, commissioned by SF Jazz
- The Wind Garden (2017), a permanent public artwork commissioned by the Stuart Collection at the University of California, San Diego
- Become Desert (2017), a work for five ensembles, premiered at the Seattle Symphony's Benaroya Hall, 29 March 2018, conducted by Ludovic Morlot
- Lines Made by Walking (2019), string quartet, commissioned by the Tippet Rise Art Center
- Arctic Dreams (2020) for 2 sopranos, 1 alto, and 1 bass voice, violin, viola, cello, and double bass, commissioned by Synergy Vocals
- An Atlas of Deep Time (2022) for orchestra, premiered by the South Dakota Symphony Orchestra for their Centennial Finale, April 30, 2022, conducted by Delta David Gier
- Crossing Open Ground (2023)
- Prophecies of Fire (2024) for percussion quartet, premiered by Sandbox Percussion, July 10, 2024 at Kaul Auditorium, Reed College.
- Horizon (2025) for orchestra, commissioned and premiered by the Australian Chamber Orchestra in their Rachmaninoff's Rhapsody program, February 5, 2026

== Discography ==
- songbirdsongs (1981), Anne McFarland, Kevin Culver, Michel Cook (ocarina), John Luther Adams, Kevin Culver, Scott Douglas, Tim Embry (perc.), Anne McFarland, Michel Cook (picc, fl), LP, Opus One, Number 66
- A Northern Suite/Night Peace (1983), The Arctic Chamber Orchestra, Gordon Wright (cond.), The Atlanta Singers, Cheryl Bray (sop.), Joan Rubin (harp), Billy Traylor (perc.), Kevin Culver (cond.), LP, Opus One, Number 88
- Forest Without Leaves (1987), Arctic Chamber Orchestra, various vocal soloists, Byron McGilvray (cond.), LP, Owl Recording, OWL-32
- The Far Country (1993), CD, New Albion, NA 061
1. Dream in White on White The Apollo Quartet and Strings, JoAnn Falletta (cond.)
2. Night Peace The Atlanta Singers, Cheryl Bray Lower (sop.), Nella Rigel (harp), Michael Cebulski (perc.), Kevin Culver (cond.)
3. The Far Country of Sleep The Cabrillo Festival Orchestra, JoAnn Falletta (cond.)
- Earth and the Great Weather (1995), Michael Finkel (vcl), Robert Black (cb), Amy Knoles, John Luther Adams, Robert Black, Robin Lorentz (perc.), Robin Lorentz (vln), Ron Lawrence (vla), John Luther Adams, Michael Finkel (cond.), CD, New World Records, 80459-2
- Clouds of Forgetting, Clouds of Unknowing (1997), The Apollo Chamber Orchestra, JoAnn Falletta (cond.), CD, New World Records, 80500-2 – nominated for the 1999 Grammy Award in the Best Classical Contemporary Composition and Best Orchestral Performance categories
- Dark Wind (2002), Marty Walker (bass cl), Amy Knoles (vibraphone, marimba), Bryan Pezzone (piano), CD, Cold Blue Music, CB0009
- The Light That Fills the World (2002), Marty Walker (bass cl), Barry Newton (double bass), Nathaniel Reichman (keyboards, sound design), Bryan Pezzone (piano), Amy Knoles (vibraphone, marimba), Robin Lorentz (violin), CD, Cold Blue Music, CB0010
1. The Farthest Place
2. The Light That Fills the World
3. The Immeasurable Space of Tones
- In the White Silence (2003), The Oberlin Contemporary Music Ensemble, Tim Weiss (cond.), CD, New World Records, 80600-2
- Strange and Sacred Noise (2005), Percussion Group Cincinnati, CD and DVD, Mode Records, mode 153
- The Mathematics of Resonant Bodies (2006), Steven Schick (perc.), CD, Cantaloupe Music, CA21034
- for Lou Harrison (2007), Callithumpian Consort, Stephen Drury (cond.), CD, New World Records, 80669-2
- red arc/blue veil (2007), CD, Cold Blue Music, CB0026
1. Dark Waves Stephen Drury, Yukiko Takagi (piano)
2. Among Red Mountains Stephen Drury (piano)
3. Qilyuan Scott Deal, Stuart Gerber (bass drum)
4. red arc/blue veil Stephen Drury (piano), Scott Deal (Vibraphone, Crotales)
- The Place We Began (2009), CD, Cold Blue Music, CB0032 – appears on 2009's Best (Mostly) 'New Music', from WNYC
- Four Thousand Holes (2011), Callithumpian Consort, Scott Deal (perc.), Stephen Drury (cond.), CD, Cold Blue Music, CB0035
1. Four Thousand Holes
2. . . . and bells remembered . . .
- songbirdsongs (2012), CD, Mode Records, mode 240
1. songbirdsongs Callithumpian Consort, Stephen Drury (cond.)
2. Strange Birds Passing New England Conservatory Contemporary Music Ensemble, John Heiss (cond.)
- Inuksuit (2013), So Percussion Ensemble, Doug Perkins (cond.). CD and DVD recording. Cantaloupe Music [no catalog number].
- Become Ocean (2014), Seattle Symphony; Ludovic Morlot, conductor, Cantaloupe Music CA 21101
- The Wind In High Places (2015), JACK Quartet, Northwestern University Cello Ensemble, Cold Blue Music, CB0041
- Ilimaq (2015), Glenn Kotche, Cantaloupe Music
- Everything That Rises (2017), JACK Quartet (CD, Cold Blue Music CB0051, February 2018)
- Become Desert (2019), Seattle Symphony; Ludovic Morlot, conductor, Cantaloupe Music CA 21148
- The Become Trilogy (2020), Seattle Symphony; Ludovic Morlot, conductor, Cantaloupe Music – contains Become Ocean, Become Desert (remastered) and Become River (previously unreleased).
- Lines Made by Walking (2020), album also includes untouched, JACK Quartet, Cold Blue Music CB0058
- Houses of the Wind (2022), (CD Cold Blue Music CB0063, June 2022)
- An Atlas of Deep Time (2024); South Dakota Symphony Orchestra; Delta David Gier, conductor (Cantaloupe Music CA21199)

== Writings ==
- Silences So Deep: Music, Solitude, Alaska (Farrar, Straus and Giroux 2020)
- The Place Where You Go To Listen – In Search of an Ecology of Music (Wesleyan University Press, 2009)
- "The Immeasurable Space of Tones", Musicworks 91 (Spring, 2005)
- "Sonic Geography Alaska", Musicworks 93 (Fall, 2005)
- "Winter Music: Composing the North", (Wesleyan University Press, 2004)
- "Global Warming and Art", Orion (September–October, 2003)
- "Global Warming and Art", Musicworks 86 (Summer, 2003)
- "Winter Music. A Composer's Journal", In The Best Spiritual Writing 2002, edited by Philip Zaleski (Harper Collins, 2002), pp. 1–21.
- "Winter Music. A Composer's Journal", Musicworks 82 (February, 2002)
- "The Place Where You Go to Listen", In The Book of Music and Nature, edited by David Rothenberg and Marta Ulvaeus (Wesleyan University Press, 2000), pp. 181–182.
- "Winter Music. A Composer's Journal", In Reflections on American Music, edited by James R. Heintze and Michael Saffle (Hillsdale, NY: Pendragon Press, 2000), pp. 31–48.
- "Strange and Sacred Noise", Yearbook of Soundscape Studies (Vol. 1: "Northern Soundscapes", ed. R. Murray Schafer and Helmi Järviluoma, 1998), pp. 143–146.
- "The Place Where You Go to Listen", Terra Nova, 2/3, 1997, pp. 15–16.
- "From the Ground Up", The Utne Reader, March/April, 1995, p. 86.
- "Resonance of Place, Confessions of an Out-of-Town Composer", The North American Review, January/February, 1994, pp. 8–18.
