= Become Ocean =

Composition by John Luther Adams

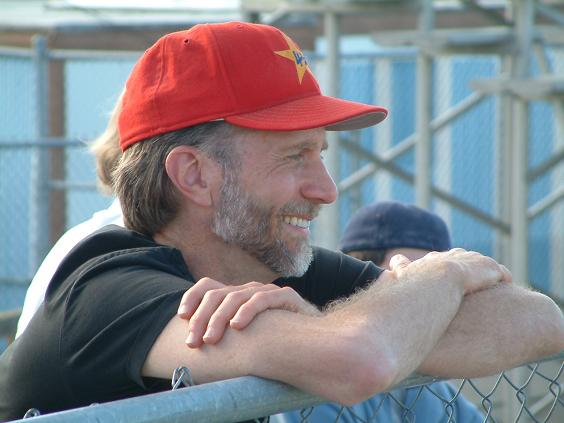
John Luther Adams

Become Ocean is an orchestral composition by American composer John Luther Adams. The Seattle Symphony Orchestra commissioned the work and premiered it at Benaroya Hall, Seattle, on 20 and 22 June 2013. The work won the 2014 Pulitzer Prize for Music and the 2015 Grammy Award for Best Classical Contemporary Composition. In 2019, writers of The Guardian ranked it the 10th greatest work of art music since 2000.

== Inspiration ==
The work, in a single movement, was inspired by the oceans of Alaska and the Pacific Northwest. The composer took his title from a phrase of John Cage in honour of Lou Harrison, and further explained his title with this note placed in his score:

"Life on this earth first emerged from the sea. As the polar ice melts and sea level rises, we humans find ourselves facing the prospect that once again we may quite literally become ocean."

== Instrumentation and structure ==
Become Ocean is scored for a large orchestra divided into 3 spatially-separated groups:

First group
upstage right, as far as possible from the strings and brass
3 flutes
3 oboes, 3rd doubling English horn
3 clarinets, 3rd doubling bass clarinet
3 bassoons, 3rd doubling contrabassoon
Percussion I, including

marimba
vibraphone
crotales

harp I (ideally 2 players)

Second group
upstage left, as far as possible from the strings and woodwind
4 horns
3 trumpets
3 trombones
tuba
Percussion II, including

marimba
vibraphone

harp II (ideally 2 players)

Third group
in a wide as possible arc across the stage
Percussion III, including

3 bass drums
tam-tam
suspended cymbal

timpani
celesta
piano
violins 1A, 1B, 2A, and 2B
violas 1 and 2
cellos 1 and 2
double basses 1 and 2, the E-strings tuned down a whole-tone to D

Each group is given slowly moving sequences of sound, often in the form of arpeggios for the strings, and each block has its own rise and fall. Thus the groups overlap in an ever-changing pattern. Harmonies are fundamentally tonal; simple diatonic intervals form the basis of the wind instruments' staggered chords. The phrase lengths are constructed so that there are three moments when all the groups reach a climax together; the first is early on, and the second represents the greatest surge of sound. From that point, the music is played in reverse: the entire piece is a palindrome. Music critic Alex Ross has hand-drawn a diagram of the work and digitised it.

Underlying this pattern, a rippling effect is provided by a centrally placed piano (which plays continually throughout), four harps, celesta, one percussionist on bass drums, timpani, tamtam and cymbals, and two percussionists, placed on each side, on mallet instruments.

The composer specifies colored lighting to match the activity of the orchestral groups, but after the first two performances these were not used.

== Performances ==
The initial review, by Melinda Bargreen in The Seattle Times, was lukewarm, finding the work "pleasant", but:

after the first 20 minutes or so, the musical ideas had pretty much run their course, and there were no further developments to justify sustaining the piece.

By contrast, Alex Ross, writing in The New Yorker and on his blog, gave a strongly positive review, saying he "went away reeling" and that "[i]t may be the loveliest apocalypse in musical history." He compared Become Ocean with The Rite of Spring and also provided a technical analysis. Following the world premiere in Seattle, Morlot and the Seattle Symphony performed the work at the Arlene Schnitzer Concert Hall in Portland, Oregon, on March 30, 2014. It was repeated in Seattle at a free concert on May 2, 2014.

The New York premiere of Become Ocean occurred on May 6, 2014 at Carnegie Hall, with the Seattle Symphony and Morlot performing in the now-defunct 'Spring for Music' series at Carnegie Hall. This was the first live performance of the work that Adams himself heard, as an eye condition and resulting surgery caused him to miss the world premiere in Seattle. Reviews, including one by the New York Times chief music critic, Anthony Tommasini, were generally highly complimentary. Subsequent performances have occurred in Winnipeg (February 2015), Los Angeles (November 2015) and Miami (December 2015).

The UK premiere took place in Birmingham at Symphony Hall on 19 May 2016, Ludovic Morlot conducting the City of Birmingham Symphony Orchestra.

The work was performed by the MDR Symphony Orchestra conducted by Kristjan Järvi in Leipzig on 13 January 2017, and was broadcast on the MDR Klassik radio station on 14 January 2017.

On 13 December 2019, the Bergen Philharmonic Orchestra performed Become Ocean, with Seattle Symphony's (former) Creative Director Ludovic Morlot again conducting the piece, this time for its Nordic Premiere.

== Recording ==
Cantaloupe Music released the premiere recording on October 30, 2014, on CD and DVD. The DVD includes still images and a surround sound mix supervised by Adams. After hearing this recording of Become Ocean, Taylor Swift donated USD $50,000 to the Seattle Symphony.

== "Become" trilogy ==
Become Ocean was preceded by Become River (2010) for chamber orchestra and followed by Become Desert (2017) for an ensemble of five orchestral and choral groups. The composer said these works formed "...a trilogy that I never set out to write in the first place."
