= American Modern Recordings =

American classical music record label

American Modern Recordings (AMR)
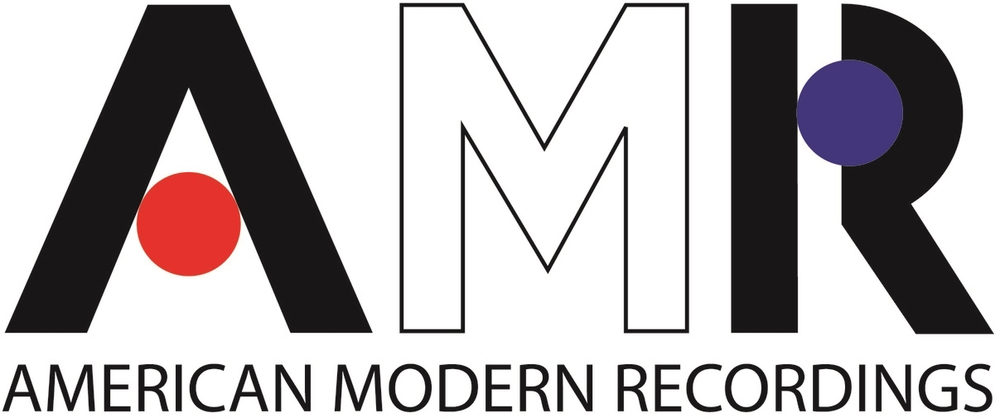
- Parent company: Lumiere
- Founded: 2008
- Founder: Robert Paterson; Victoria Paterson
- Distributor: Naxos
- Genre: Contemporary classical music
- Country of origin: US
- Location: New York City
- Official website: americanmodernrecordings.com

American Modern Recordings (AMR) is an American classical music record label focusing on contemporary classical music, and in particular, music by living American composers. It was established by Robert Paterson in 2006 and is a subsidiary of Mostly Modern Projects. It is based in New York, New York, and is distributed through Naxos of America, a division of Naxos Records.

== History ==
AMR was founded in 2008 with the mission of producing and promoting albums of contemporary classical music by living composers, with an emphasis on American composers. AMR is a subsidiary of Mostly Modern Projects, Inc., a non-profit that focuses on performing and recording music by living composers. AMR's sister label, Lumiere Records, is a classical crossover label.

== Albums ==
As of July 2015, AMR has released twenty-five albums, including six featuring the American Modern Ensemble, AMR's house band, and many of the albums featuring AMR's founder Robert Paterson, in particular. AMR has also released albums featuring Duo Scorpio, Makoto Nakura, Musica Sacra (New York) and saxophonist Jeremy Justeson. AMR's albums have been released to critical acclaim in newspapers, magazines and online journals and blogs such as The New York Times, Sequenza21, Gramophone and many other publications.

== See also ==
- List of record labels
