= Robert Paterson (composer) =

- Born: Robert Anthony Paterson; April 29, 1970 (age 56)
- Origin: Buffalo, New York, United States
- Genre: Contemporary classical
- Occupations: Composer, Conductor, Percussionist
- Years active: 1984–present
- Website: www.robertpaterson.com

Robert Paterson (born April 29, 1970) is an American composer of contemporary classical music, as well as a conductor and percussionist. His catalog includes over 120 compositions. He has been called a "modern day master" and is primarily known for his colorful orchestral works, large body of chamber music and clear vocal writing in his operas, choral works, vocal chamber works and song cycles.

== Early years ==
Paterson was born on the West Side of Buffalo, New York. He is the son of Tony Paterson, an award-winning sculptor who was a Professor of Sculpture at the University at Buffalo, and Eleanor Paterson, a painter and bilingual education director at Erie Community College who received her Ph.D. in bilingual education from the University at Buffalo. Although Paterson was surrounded by sculptors and painters while growing up, his father enjoyed contemporary classical music and took him to new-music concerts at the University at Buffalo, where he heard works by Morton Feldman and John Cage, with both composers in attendance. Paterson "grew up in a home where his parents – a sculptor and a painter – always listened to music." He has one brother, David Paterson, who is also a musician and teaches in the New York City public schools.

Paterson began composing on his own at age 13 and studied composition privately for two years with William Ortiz-Alvarado from 1984–86. He also took private percussion lessons at age 12 and attended the Interlochen Center for the Arts for two summers, in 1982 and 1983. He attended the Nichols School in eighth grade and middle school and high school at the Buffalo Academy for Visual and Performing Arts, where he performed in the wind ensemble, jazz band and various choirs, and also played on the tennis team. He also studied percussion with various teachers in the greater Buffalo area, including Lynn Harbold (former principal percussionist with the Buffalo Philharmonic Orchestra), Jack Brennan (former assistant timpanist with the Buffalo Philharmonic Orchestra, timpanist with the Indianapolis Symphony Orchestra), David DePeters (former percussionist and Executive Director, Iris Orchestra, CEO of the National Repertory Orchestra), Anthony Miranda and John Bacon, as well as piano with Claudia Hoca (pianist for the Buffalo Philharmonic Orchestra) and Edmund Gordanier. While a high school student, Paterson also attended the Boston University Tanglewood Institute for two summers, where he studied percussion with members of the Boston Symphony Orchestra, including Arthur Press, Charlie Smith, and Tom Gauger, and also performed in the BUTI Orchestra under Eiji Oue and guest conductor Leonard Bernstein.

== Education ==
Paterson received a Bachelor of Music degree from the Eastman School of Music where he studied with Christopher Rouse, Joseph Schwantner, Samuel Adler, Warren Benson and David Liptak, graduating in 1995. While at Eastman, he was a double major in composition and percussion and studied percussion with John H. Beck, and also performed in Eastman's Musica Nova ensemble under Sydney Hodkinson and also became a member of Phi Mu Alpha Sinfonia. In 2001 he received a Master of Music degree from the Jacobs School of Music of Indiana University in Bloomington, where he studied composition with Frederick A. Fox and Eugene O'Brien, performing in the IU Contemporary Ensemble under David Dzubay, and percussion with Gerald Carlyss (former timpanist with the Philadelphia Orchestra) and Thomas Stubbs (Saint Louis Symphony Orchestra). In 2004, he received a Doctor of Musical Arts degree from Cornell University where he studied composition with Steven Stucky and Roberto Sierra. In 1999 he studied with John Harbison and Bernard Rands at the Aspen Music Festival and School, as part of the Advanced Master Class and as the recipient of the Second ASCAP Aspen Film Fellowship. In 2000 he studied privately with Aaron Jay Kernis at the Atlantic Center for the Arts.

== Career ==
After leaving graduate school, Paterson moved to New York City and soon after began teaching at Bronx Community College for one year, and then Sarah Lawrence College for four years. While teaching, Paterson began working on a variety of commissions for ensembles such as Quintet of The Americas, The California EAR Unit and Volti. In 2005, Paterson and his wife Victoria co-founded the American Modern Ensemble and American Modern Recordings, an Independent record label distributed by Naxos of America (a division of Naxos Records) specializing in contemporary classical music, with an emphasis on music by living American composers.

Paterson's music has been performed throughout the United States, Europe, Asia, Africa and Australia, and his works have been commissioned and/or performed by over one-hundred ensembles, including American Modern Ensemble, both self-produced as well as presented by ChamberMusicNY at Merkin Concert Hall, the Louisville Orchestra, Vermont Symphony Orchestra, Austin Symphony, American Composers Orchestra, Minnesota Orchestra, Quintet of the Americas, Chamber Choir of Europe, Musica Sacra (New York) and the Volti choir of San Francisco. Other ensembles that have performed Paterson's works include The New York New Music Ensemble, Fireworks Ensemble, JACK Quartet, Del Sol Quartet, PubliQuartet, MAYA, Da Capo Chamber Players, California EAR Unit, Cygnus, Ensemble Aleph (Paris), Ensemble Nouvelles Consonances (Belgium), Kairos String Quartet, Cayuga Chamber Orchestra, Russian Chamber Orchestra, MANCA Festival presented by the Centre National de Creation Musicale (CIRM) and the June in Buffalo new music festival.

As a conductor, Paterson has conducted the American Modern Ensemble since it was founded in 2005, and has also conducted the Society for New Music ensemble and Atlantic Music Festival Contemporary Ensemble. As a percussionist, Paterson spent many years developing a six-mallet technique based on the Burton grip. He developed this technique while studying with John Beck at the Eastman School of Music, where he presented the world's first all six-mallet marimba recital. As well as composing his own six-mallet works, he has "been instrumental in the commissioning of six-mallet works for solo marimba" and has to date, written fourteen works using a six-mallet technique (extended technique) he developed. His recording Six Mallet Marimba is the first all six-mallet marimba album ever released, and contains many of Paterson's six-mallet marimba compositions. Paterson performs on a five-octave marimba made by Doug DeMorrow.

Paterson's work as a composer and percussionist appear on recordings for American Modern Recordings (AMR), Mode Records, Bridge Records, Centaur Records, Capstone Records, and Riax.

== Teaching ==
In 2016, Paterson was the Director of the Composition Program at the Atlantic Music Festival, and he taught there from 2012 to 2017. He is currently the Artistic Director of the Mostly Modern Festival. Paterson has taught at Cornell University, Sarah Lawrence College, Hobart and William Smith Colleges, Bronx Community College, The Walden School, Point Counterpoint (New Music on The Point), the Atlantic Music Festival, where he was head of the composition program for two summers, and the Rocky Ridge Music Center, where he was also Composer-In-Residence from 2012–14, and was a visiting composer in 2015.

== Personal life ==
Paterson is the son of American sculptor Tony Paterson. He lives in Hell's Kitchen, Manhattan in New York City with his wife, Victoria Paterson, a violinist, and their son Dylan Paterson. He is vegan and an accomplished cook, and has compared inventing recipes to composing, but with food instead of musical notes.

== Musical style ==
Paterson's music is influenced by nature (particularly the classical elements), and many of his works have ecological themes, such as "A New Eaarth" and "Embracing The Wind". His works are also inspired by rock and roll (such as "Ghost Theater" which quotes the John Bonham drumset part from When the Levee Breaks by Led Zeppelin and "Hell's Kitchen"), jazz (the last movement from "Symphony in Three Movements" and "Thursday"), world music ("The Book of Goddesses") and Indian music (the third movement of "Sun Trio").

Paterson is also influenced by the music of other classical composers, including Russian composers such as Igor Stravinsky ("Sun Trio", second movement), Dmitri Shostakovich and Alfred Schnittke, and French composers such as Maurice Ravel, Erik Satie, Claude Debussy and Olivier Messiaen, and American composers such as Aaron Copland, Charles Ives, Steve Reich and many of his former teachers. He has said, "...I am essentially interested in unifying all musical elements—and many non-musical elements (i.e. ‘noise’) — into a cohesive whole.”

Stylistically, although some of Paterson's works are atonal, a large selection of Paterson's works are tonal, combining major and minor scales and modes with chromaticism, Octatonic scales, Blues scales, Tone rows, artificial scales and scales from non-Western cultures, such as his use of the Indonesian Pelog scale in his work "Quintus". Some of his works derive their material from chromatically saturated harmonic patterns that combine chords, melodies and motivic ideas that complete the chromatic scale within given sections of works. Formally, some of Paterson's works are highly episodic, such as his "Sextet" and "Hell's Kitchen", while others are more seamless, such as "Dark Mountains" for orchestra, "A Dream Within A Dream" for a cappella choir or "Deep Blue Ocean" for two pianos.

Paterson's music is generally very colorful, and he incorporates extended techniques in many of his works, such as "Scorpion Tales" for two harps, "The Book of Goddesses" for flute, harp and percussion, "Komodo" and "Piranha" for solo marimba and "Eating Variations" for baritone and chamber ensemble. He also occasionally uses found objects, such as in his work "Hell's Kitchen", which calls for kitchen utensils, pots and pans, and even a kitchen sink.

Many of his works also use bell sounds, and Paterson has said, "I am fascinated with resonance, and how notes ring. I also like bell sounds, and often ask non-percussionists to play cup gongs (temple bowls or Tibetan bowls), finger cymbals and other hand-held percussion instruments", such as "The Thin Ice of Your Fragile Mind", which calls for many of the performers to use graduated finger cymbals and Tingshas, "Eating Variations" which calls for specifically-pitched singing bowls, and "A New Eaarth," which calls for non-percussionists (such as one of the flute players) to use specifically-tuned wind chimes.

Many of Paterson's works are programmatic, such as "Electric Lines" for orchestra, "Crimson Earth" for symphonic band and "Sextet" for chamber ensemble. Themes that have inspired Paterson have included famous icons such as Thomas Edison (for his work "Sonata for Bassoon and Piano") and Mike Piazza (in his song cycle "Batter's Box", formerly titled "Stepping Into The Batter's Box, He Hears His Father's Voice"), while other works are inspired by famous paintings ("Closet Full of Demons" for sinfonietta, inspired by The Nightmare by Henry Fuseli, "Crimson Earth", inspired by The Triumph of Death by Pieter Bruegel the Elder) and the third movement of his "Wind Quintet", inspired by Salvador Dalí's The Persistence of Memory.

A few of his works quote the works of other composers, such as his" Elegy for Two Bassoons and Piano" and "Elegy for Two Cellos and Piano", the same work with different instrumentation, both of which quote the music of Johann Sebastian Bach. His work "Looney Tunes" quotes Olivier Messiaen and Charlie Parker, and his 'Sonata for Bassoon and Piano" quotes Sergei Rachmaninoff and Pacific 231 by Arthur Honegger. In the second movement of Paterson's "Wind Quintet, "Suburban waltz-fantasy", there are quotes from well-known television show themes, including The Jetsons, All in the Family, Green Acres, The Dick Van Dyke Show, The Brady Bunch and Leave It to Beaver.

Although many of Paterson's works are serious or at least musically abstract in nature, a selection of his works incorporate humorous elements, such as his chamber vocal song cycles "Batter's Box" and "CAPTCHA", and his choral works "The Essence of Gravity" and "Did You Hear." Regarding humor in his own music, Paterson has said, “Of all of the aspects of writing that seem to intrigue people regarding my work, my embracing humor is probably the most contentious: some people like, it, some do not. Many composers admit that they do not care to write ‘funny’ music. It seems as if they think they are in danger of being considered trivial or not serious if they embrace humor."

Paterson has spent a good part of his career composing vocal works. Although he has set numerous poems by poets such as Wallace Stevens and Robert Creeley, he has also set a myriad of diverse, alternative texts, such as fictitious answering machine messages ("Thursday" for soprano and piano), onomatopoeia words ("The Essence of Gravity" for a cappella choir), and even nursery rhymes ("Life is But a Dream" for a cappella choir). One of these works, "CAPTCHA" for baritone and piano, "...derives its lyrics from the two-word answers to reCAPTCHA puzzles. The lyrics are a combination of words, numbers and fragments of words and nonsense."

Within his vocal output, one of his primary works is the climate change inspired "A New Eaarth" for orchestra, chorus and narrator, commissioned by the Vermont Youth Orchestra Association, and inspired by Eaarth by Bill McKibben, who narrated at the premiere. Described by the press as "an amazingly colorful tone poem", "A New Eaarth" consists of alternating sections of pure orchestral music, narration, and sections for orchestra and chorus (these excerpted choral movements also exist as a work for a choir and piano entitled "Suite from A New Eaarth"). The work addresses climate change and is divided into four main sections, each section centered on one of the four classical elements and how they relate to environmental disasters such as flooding, tornadoes, hurricanes and forest fires, all thought to be exacerbated by climate change. The text for this work consists of narrative text by Paterson based on statements and statistics in McKibben's book, as well as poems by Wendell Berry, James Joyce, Percy Bysshe Shelley and William Wordsworth and well-known quotes and aphorisms.

== Selected awards and recognition ==
- (2018) A.I. Dupont Composer's Award from the Delaware Symphony Orchestra
- (2014) Utah Arts Festival Composition Competition
- (2013) The Companion, one-act opera from Three Way, selected from a national call for scores for Fort Worth Opera Frontiers program
- (2012) League of American Orchestras/New Music USA Three-Year Residency with the Vermont Youth Orchestra Association (2009–12)
- (2011) American Opera Projects Composers & The Voice program
- (2011) Composer of The Year Award, Classical Recording Foundation, presented at Carnegie Hall by Christopher Rouse
- (2011) Cincinnati Camerata Composition Competition
- (2009) Yaddo Residency
- (2006) Copland House Residency Award
- (2005) Auros Group for New Music Eighth Annual Composition Competition
- (2005) Louisiana Orchestra Composition Contest
- (2005) American Composers Forum Jerome Composers Commissioning Program commission
- (2005) Volti Choral Arts Laboratory recipient
- (2004) Meet the Composer grant for working with the Minnesota Orchestra
- (2004) Minnesota Orchestra Reading Session and Composer Institute with "Electric Lines"
- (2003) MacDowell Colony Residency
- (2003) American Composers Orchestra Underwood/Whitaker New Music Reading Sessions with "Electric Lines"
- (2001) Finger Lakes Chamber Ensemble New Music Competition
- (2001) Tampa Bay Composers Forum First Prize for Excellence in Chamber Music Composition
- (2000) ASCAP Foundation Morton Gould Young Composer Award
- (1999) Society for New Music, Brian M. Israel Prize
- (1998) ASCAP Foundation Morton Gould Young Composer Award

== Discography ==
- (2022) The Indianapolis Quartet: The Indianapolis Quartet: Robert Paterson - String Quartets 1-3
- (2022) American Modern Ensemble: In Real Life; American Modern Recordings
- (2022) Robert Paterson • Daniela Mars: Estsanatlehi
- (2020) American Modern Ensemble: The Four Seasons; American Modern Recordings
- (2018) Auréole: Embracing The Wind; American Modern Recordings
- (2017) Three Way: A Trio of One-Act Operas (Nashville Opera, Libretto by David Cote); American Modern Recordings
- (2017) Spheres: Music of Robert Paterson (Claremont Trio); American Modern Recordings
- (2017) Perspectives (American Brass Quintet); Summit
- (2016): Joy: Music for Violin and Piano (Linya Su, Blair McMillen); American Modern Recordings
- (2015) Mavericks (American Modern Ensemble); American Modern Recordings
- (2015) Eternal Reflections: Choral Music of Robert Paterson; American Modern Recordings
- (2015) Powerhouse Pianists II: Works for Two Pianos; American Modern Recordings
- (2014) Ars Nostra: Persona; Centaur Records
- (2014) Gillian Maitland: Plocanan; Gillian Maitland
- (2013) Robert Paterson: Winter Songs and other Vocal works; American Modern Recordings
- (2013) Guerrilla New Music: Great Noise Ensemble; CD Baby
- (2012) Wood and Forest, Makoto Nakura, marimba; American Modern Recordings
- (2012) Six Mallet Marimba, American Modern Ensemble; American Modern Recordings
- (2012) Duo Scorpio: Scorpion Tales; American Modern Recordings
- (2011) The Book of Goddesses: MAYA, Clockwise and American Modern Ensemble; American Modern Recordings
- (2010) Pimpin': Tongue and Groove: Jeremy Justeson, saxophone; American Modern Recordings
- (2010) Star Crossing: Music of Robert Paterson; American Modern Recordings
- (2006) Jewish Roots – Music for Wind Quintet: Wind Quintet: Philharmonia Quintet, Kraców (Medialogic)
- (2003) Society of Composers, Inc: Cornucopia; Capstone Records
- (2000) Kesatuan: Figures in a Landscape; Centaur Records

== Complete works ==
All works are published by Bill Holab Music.

=== Opera ===
- Cocoa Cantata (2020) (libretto by David Cote.)
- Three Way (2014–16) (three one-act operas with libretti by David Cote. Includes "The Companion", "Safe Word", and "Masquerade")
- The Whole Truth (2015) (chamber opera in seven scenes with libretto by Mark Campbell)

=== Orchestra/chamber orchestra/sinfonietta ===
- Whitman's America (2015–16) (orchestra, chorus, soprano and baritone soloists)
- A New Eaarth (2012) (orchestra, chorus and narrator)
- Closet Full of Demons (2000–01)
- Dark Mountains (2011)
- Electric Lines (2002–03/04) for orchestra (Awarded the Louisville Orchestra Composition Contest prize in 2005.)
- Enlightened City (2005)
- I See You (2015) (string orchestra and recording)
- Slightly Comic Overture (1995–96)
- Suite for String Orchestra (2001)
- Symphony in Three Movements (2002)

=== Symphonic band/wind ensemble ===
- Crimson Earth (1997–99/2004)
- Firecracker Alley (2013–14)
- The Winds of Time (2021)

=== Choral ===
- A Dream Within A Dream (2010)
- Did You Hear? (2010, text by David Cote)
- Eternal Reflections (2010)
- Four Walden Canons (1999)
- I Go Among Trees (2019)
- Graffiti Canons (2015)
- Life is But a Dream (2010)
- Listen (2021–22) (for choir and chamber sextet)
- Look To The Sky (2021) (chorus with piano)
- Lux Aeterna (2010–11)
- Snow Day (2014), (text by David Cote)
- Suite from A New Eaarth (2012) (chorus with piano)
- The Essence of Gravity (2004–05)

=== Vocal chamber ===
- Autumn Songs (2019) for mezzo-soprano and sextet or piano
- The Bell (2018) for narrator and chamber ensemble
- Spring Songs (2018) for tenor and piano
- CAPTCHA (2018) for mezzo-soprano and piano
- Ouvir Estrellas (2017) for soprano and piano
- Night Songs (2016–17) for bass-baritone and piano
- Batter's Box (2005) for tenor and piano
- CAPTCHA (2013) for baritone and piano
- Crossing The Hudson (2016) for soprano baritone and piano
- Eating Variations (2006) for baritone, flute, clarinet, violin, cello and percussion
- Ghost Theater (2013) for two female singers, large chamber ensemble and optional film
- In Real Life I (2015–16) dating site songs for soprano and piano. Text by David Cote
- In Real Life II (2022) dating site songs for baritone and piano. Text by David Cote
- Spring Songs (2019) for tenor and sextet or piano
- Summer Songs (2016) for soprano and sextet
- Summer Songs (2016) for soprano and piano
- The Biographies of Solitude (1990) for soprano, viola and cello
- Thursday (1999) for soprano and piano
- Winter Songs (2000/2007–08) for bass-baritone and sextet or piano

=== Mixed chamber ===
- Eating Variations (2006) for baritone, flute, clarinet, violin, cello and percussion
- Embracing the Wind (1999) for flute, viola and harp
- Freya's Tears (2010–11) for violin and harp
- Glitch (2019) for solo harp
- Hell's Kitchen (2014) for flute, clarinet, violin, cello, percussion, piano
- Looney Tunes (2006–07) for flute, saxophone, violin, cello, electric guitar, electric bass, percussion and piano
- Pegasus (2013) for flute and harp
- Quintus (1996) for clarinet, violin, cello, marimba and piano (Awarded the Society of New Music's Brian Israel Prize in 1999.)
- Relative Theory (2019) for instrumental quartet
- Scorpion Tales (2012) for two harps
- Sextet (1999) for flute, clarinet, violin, cello, percussion and piano (Awarded the ASCAP Morton Gould Young Composer's Award in 2000.)
- Skylights (2000) for clarinet, violin, cello and piano
- Shard (2013) for flute, clarinet, violin, cello, percussion and piano (in-progress)
- Star Crossing (1999) for flute, clarinet, percussion and piano (Awarded the Tampa Bay Composers Forum First Prize for Excellence in Chamber Music Composition in 2001.)
- Sun Trio (1995), for violin, cello and piano (movement II from Sun Trio) (Awarded the Finger Lakes Chamber Ensemble New Music Competition award in 2001.)
- The Book of Goddesses (2010), for flute, harp and percussion (Awarded the Classical Recording Foundation "Composer of The Year" award in 2011.)
- The Thin Ice of Your Fragile Mind (2004) for flute, clarinet, violin, cello, percussion and piano
- Up North (1994) for clarinet, violin, cello, percussion and piano
- Winter Songs (2000/2007–08) for bass-baritone and sextet

=== Woodwind ===
- Elegy (2006–07) for two bassoons and piano
- Sonata for Bassoon and Piano (2001)
- Wind Quintet (2000/2003–04)

=== Brass ===
- Soar (2022) for trumpet and piano
- Dash (2020) for brass quintet
- Expressions (1989) for trumpet and piano
- Fanfare (1997) for trumpet sextet
- Fantasia (1997) for tuba and marimba
- Overture for Brass Quintet (1990)
- Shine for Brass Quintet (2015)

=== Strings ===
- Adagio (2021) for solo violin
- Elegy (2006–07/2008) for two cellos and piano (transcription of work for two bassoons and piano)
- I See You (2015) for string quartet and recording
- Sonata No. 1 for Violin and Piano (2003), (awarded the Auros Group for New Music Eight Annual Competition prize in 2005)
- String Quartet No. 1 (1996–97), awarded the ASCAP Morton Gould Young Composers Award in 1998
- String Quartet No. 2 (2018–19)
- String Quartet No. 3 (2019–20)

=== Percussion ===
- Binary Hearts (2016) for solo marimba (four mallets)
- Christmas Time (1990) for keyboard percussion ensemble (Christmas medley)
- Excerptia Overture (1991) for keyboard percussion ensemble (percussion excerpt medley)
- Helter Skelter (1984) for percussion quartet
- Humanus Ex Machina (1989) for percussion ensemble
- Komodo (2004) for solo marimba (uses six-mallets)
- Mandala (2012) for two marimbas
- Merry Go Round (1988–90) for solo marimba (uses six-mallets)
- Piranha (2007) for solo marimba (uses six-mallets)
- Postludes Nos. 1–3 (1990–93) for solo marimba (uses six-mallets)
- Prison Cell (1989/2008) for two percussionists
- Pyro (2021) for solo marimba
- Sabulum Reptilia (1985) for percussion ensemble
- Stealing Thunder (1999–2000) for percussion ensemble and recording
- That's Amore (1992) for keyboard percussion ensemble (arrangement of Dean Martin song That's Amore)
- Voices (1988) for 12 clappers

=== Marimba with one instrument ===
- Braids (1998/2000) for violin and marimba (uses six-mallets)
- Clarinatrix (2011) for bass clarinet and marimba (uses six-mallets)
- Duo for Flute and Marimba (1998–99) (uses four, five and six-mallets)
- Fantasia for Tuba & Marimba (1992) (uses six-mallets)
- Links & Chains (1996/2000) for violin and marimba (uses six-mallets)
- Stillness (2011) for oboe and marimba (uses six-mallets)
- Tongue and Groove (2008–09) for alto saxophone and marimba (uses six-mallets)
- Tongue and Groove (2009) for alto saxophone and marimba (uses four-mallets)

=== Keyboard ===
- Deep Blue Ocean (2010) for two pianos
- Joy Ride (2011) for solo piano
- Meditation (1997) for solo organ
- Variations & Fantasies on an Accordion Song (1995) for solo piano

=== Film ===
- Journey Into Courage Film Score/Suite (1994–95) (percussion part uses six-mallets)
