= Delta David Gier =

American conductor (born 1960)

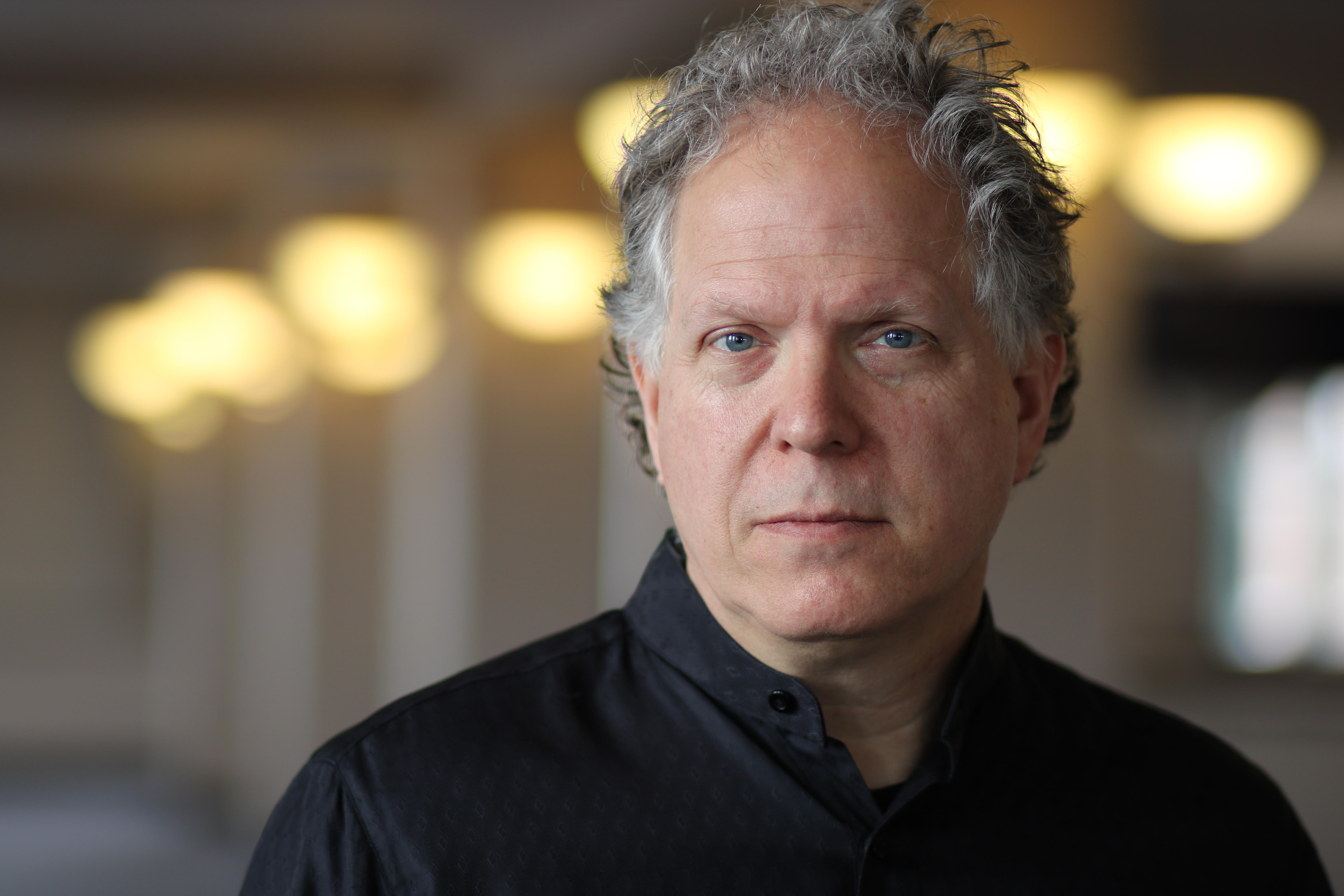
- Born: April 3, 1960 (age 66)
- Education: University of Michigan
- Awards: 2022 Ditson Conductor's Award, 2012 ASCAP John S. Edwards Award
- Website: https://www.deltadavidgier.com/

Delta David Gier (born April 3, 1960) is an American conductor. Gier is music director of the South Dakota Symphony Orchestra, following 15 seasons with the New York Philharmonic as an assistant conductor. He has directed most major orchestras in the United States and has worked extensively with orchestras across Central and South America, Europe, and Asia.

Gier has received national recognition as an advocate for both contemporary classical music and the role of local arts organizations in intercultural community building. In 2012, he was selected for ASCAP’s John S. Edwards Award for Strongest Commitment to New American Music and in 2022 he received the Ditson Conductor’s Award for the advancement of American music. In Columbia University’s presentation of the latter award, Gier is described as

a widely renowned conductor who is remarkable in his dedication to contemporary American music. [… H]e has shown an unstinting commitment to programming American orchestral works, many of them premieres. He has developed the program Bridging Cultures, which is devoted to promoting the music of indigenous and diverse communities. He is a model of the engaged conductor.

== Biography ==
=== Education and early career ===
Gier was born in Sherman, Texas, on April 3, 1960, to Jonelle and Delta Warren Gier. He began studying trumpet with Dick Jorgenson at the age of 15, starting with instruction privately and at Interlochen Arts Camp.

In the 1980s, Gier was a conducting student at both the Tanglewood Music Center and the Aspen Music Festival, where he studied with many acclaimed conductors, including Leonard Bernstein, Kurt Masur, Erich Leinsdorf, Seiji Ozawa, and Gustav Meier. In 1984, Meier invited Gier to pursue postgraduate studies with him at the University of Michigan. After completing his Master of Music degree, Gier apprenticed with the Philadelphia Orchestra for the 1986–87 season at the invitation of Riccardo Muti.

Gier began his conducting career as a Fulbright Scholar in Eastern Europe from 1988 to 1990. During this period he led numerous critically acclaimed performances with orchestras in Romania, Poland, Slovakia, and Turkey, including a tour with the State Philharmonic of Košice in former Czechoslovakia. Several of these concerts served to introduce Eastern European audiences to American music: Gier conducted the Romanian premiere of Aaron Copland’s Appalachian Spring with the Bucharest Philharmonic and the Turkish premiere of Samuel Barber’s Violin Concerto with the Presidential Symphony Orchestra of Ankara.

=== New York Philharmonic ===
In 1994, Music Director Kurt Masur selected Gier to be an assistant conductor at the New York Philharmonic, a role he maintained for 15 seasons under the direction of both Masur and Lorin Maazel. Gier’s debut performance with the Philharmonic was in the summer of 2000, conducting a program including Stravinsky’s Firebird ballet suite and Bernstein's overture to Candide. The concert was reviewed positively in The Journal News, where Gier was praised at length for "guiding splendid performances": "Gier demonstrated the ability to control this orchestra, not always an easy task, and put together interesting interpretations. He set up the musical climaxes masterfully[. ...] In his hands, the energy was held in check until the last possible moment and the concluding whirlwind was very effective."

Gier conducted many educational concerts with the New York Philharmonic, as well as with the Cleveland Orchestra, Philadelphia Orchestra, and Chicago Symphony Orchestra. Over his last two seasons as assistant conductor, he served as both host and conductor for two complete series of the New York Philharmonic’s Young People’s Concerts, becoming the first person to do so since 1952.

During his tenure at the philharmonic, Gier pursued a variety of guest engagements, including a tour of over 60 performances of Bizet’s Carmen with San Francisco Opera’s Western Opera Theater in 1997. Also in 1997, Gier participated in the National Conductor Preview at the invitation of the League of American Orchestras.

=== South Dakota Symphony Orchestra ===
In 2004, Gier was appointed music director of the South Dakota Symphony Orchestra (SDSO), which has grown substantially and garnered national attention under his leadership.

==== Pulitzer series ====
During his first season, Gier instituted a concert series the Wall Street Journal recognized as "an unprecedented programming innovation", wherein each concert featured music by a Pulitzer Prize-winning composer. The series continued for the next six years, expanding to include residencies with composers John Corigliano, Jennifer Higdon, Steven Stucky, Zhou Long, and Paul Moravec. In 2006, the SDSO received the first of seven ASCAP Awards for Programming of Contemporary Music. In 2012, Gier was personally awarded ASCAP’s John S. Edwards Award for Strongest Commitment to New American Music in recognition of his work with the SDSO.

==== Lakota Music Project ====
In 2005, Gier began developing the Lakota Music Project (LMP), an ongoing SDSO initiative intended to address tensions between South Dakota's white and indigenous populations, with the guidance of Lakota and Dakota tribal elders and academics. Through reciprocal explorations of the Western classical canon, traditional Lakota music, and contemporary compositions, the LMP has occasioned continuous artistic collaboration in the form of musical partnerships between SDSO ensembles and Native American musicians like Dakota cedar flutist Brian Akipa, the New Porcupine Singers, and the Creekside Singers. The LMP has given concerts across the state's cities and reservations, as well as in Washington, D.C., in a 2019 series of concerts at the Smithsonian National Museum of the American Indian and the National Cathedral.

Gier also facilitated the creation of the SDSO's Music Composition Academies, an outgrowth of the LMP that began in 2017 and continues to provide annual summer programs for Lakota and Dakota high school students to work with composer-mentors who help each participant compose a piece for string quartet or woodwind quintet. SDSO ensembles then perform the compositions in the students' schools, and some have been included in the symphony's main-stage concerts.

The LMP's genesis was the subject of an hour-long documentary produced and aired by South Dakota Public Broadcasting (SDPB) in 2009. A 2022 SDPB feature covered the Music Composition Academies. The LMP was also profiled in The Washington Post in 2019.

A self-titled album featuring five compositions commissioned for the Lakota Music Project was released in 2022 by the label innova Recordings.

==== Other initiatives ====
Gier has derived a model from the Lakota Music Project, which has served as the SDSO’s flagship Bridging Cultures Program. Cross-cultural collaborations with Arab, Chinese, and South Asian communities, as well as Sudanese and Somali refugee communities, have featured tabla artist Zakir Hussain, oud artist Simon Shaheen, composers Malek Jandali, Chen Yi, and Zhou Long, and the Bernard Woma ensemble.

The Lakota Music Project is the foremost of several SDSO initiatives to receive support through grants from entities such as the Mellon Foundation in 2011 and the National Endowment for the Arts in 2017. In 2016, the SDSO won the Bush Prize for Community Innovation; the Bush Foundation's accompanying case study booklet praises the organization as "a visionary leader when it comes to partnering with the community to help realize the healing power of music. It thrives because it transforms the traditional, transactional orchestra model into one that is focused on service to the community."

Gier's innovative pursuit of audience engagement was the focus of the April 2023 episode of 1A's More Than Music radio program on NPR, "Shostakovich in South Dakota", which details "how Delta David Gier and the South Dakota Symphony framed Shostakovich's wartime Leningrad Symphony in order to maximize its pertinence for his Sioux Falls audience." Also exploring the achievements of the Lakota Music Project and Composition Academies in this regard, the episode describes the SDSO's collaboration with cultural historian Joe Horowitz to contextualize the symphony's 2023 performance of Shostakovich's Symphony No. 7 through a series of interdisciplinary lectures and a supplementary concert at the University of South Dakota and South Dakota State University.

==== Media recognition ====
Gier's work with the South Dakota Symphony Orchestra has received high-profile media attention from such publications as The Wall Street Journal, The Washington Post, and The New Yorker. In the New Yorker review of the world premiere of John Luther Adams's An Atlas of Deep Time (2022), composed for the SDSO in honor of its centennial, critic Alex Ross praised the ensemble as "one of America's boldest orchestras," highlighting Gier's role in the innovative programming and community engagement that have characterized its growth.

=== Other engagements ===
==== In the United States ====
Gier has held several positions of significance in the American classical music sphere. He was a juror for the 2010 Pulitzer Prize for Music and returned to chair the jury in 2011. He was also a judge for the 2010 ASCAP Foundation Rudolf Nissim Prize. He was on the board of the American Composers Forum from 2013 to 2019, and is a frequent panelist for the League of American Orchestras.

In academia, Gier has served as guest faculty at the Curtis Institute, Yale School of Music, San Francisco Conservatory, and SUNY Stony Brook.

In addition to serving as music director of the SDSO, Gier has continued conducting ensembles across the country, including the Philadelphia Orchestra, Cleveland Orchestra, Chicago Symphony, St Louis Symphony, Minnesota Orchestra, and American Composers Orchestra.

==== Abroad ====
Alongside his work in the U.S., Gier has performed internationally as a guest conductor across the Americas, Europe, and Asia, forming longstanding relationships with orchestras in Costa Rica, Italy, Hungary, Poland, China, and Thailand.

Since concluding his Fulbright in 1990, Gier has conducted and spoken periodically in Eastern Europe. In 1996, he conducted the Polish National Radio Symphony in the recording of Carson Kievman's Symphony No. 2(42) for New Albion Records, as well as Kievman's Symphony No. 3 (hurricane). Since 2010, Gier has served as principal conductor at the Crescendo Summer Institute, a music program organized annually in Hungary. Engagements elsewhere in Europe have included the Bergen Philharmonic and Kristiansand Symphony Orchestra in Norway and recurrent performances with the orchestra sinfonica della Città metropolitana di Bari in Italy, many of which have featured contemporary American music.

Gier has also worked extensively with orchestras in Central and South America. In the 2000s, he appeared as guest conductor with the Orquesta Sinfónica Nacional of Costa Rica many times, as well as the Orquesta de Cámara de Bellas Artes in Mexico and the Orquestra Sinfonica do Porto Alegre in Brazil.

In Asia, Gier has conducted the Singapore Symphony Orchestra and the Chinese orchestras of Qingdao and Hebei, and enjoys a longstanding relationship with the Thailand Philharmonic Orchestra (TPO). Among his many performances with the latter ensemble are the grand opening of the ICONSIAM mall in Bangkok in 2018 and the 2017 TPO Asian Tour in Penang and Yala, Thailand. In addition to featuring traditional Thai and Malaysian music on these concerts, Gier conducted premieres of music by living Thai and Chinese composers Narong Prangcharoen and Chen Yi, respectively. He has also introduced Thai audiences to contemporary American music like John Corigliano’s Symphony No. 1.

==== Christianity ====
Gier identifies "the integration of faith with music" as "a lifelong passion and pursuit" and has taken part in several Christian-affiliated music organizations in the capacities of artistic director, speaker, and teacher.

In Europe, these activities include his position as principal conductor at the Crescendo Summer Institute, organized by the interdenominational Christian musician network Crescendo International. Gier is further responsible for coordinating the expansion of Crescendo International's North American chapter and has established numerous hubs in cities across the United States, as well as facilitating and securing funding for initiatives like the Crescendo Chamber Music Project. Gier has also participated in the European Leadership Forum in Poland as a lecturer and panelist.

In America, Gier has been a regular guest conductor at the MasterWorks Festival since 1998. He has also served as board member and Associate Artistic Director of the Soli Deo Gloria Music Foundation, a nonprofit foundation which preserves and promotes sacred classical music through programs like the Chicago Bach Project and by commissioning new sacred works. In this context, Gier conducted the world premieres of Jacob Bancks's Lumen de Lumine in 2008 and Daniel Kellogg's From Everlasting to Everlasting in 2012. He also conducted the 2016 Chicago Bach Project performance of the B Minor Mass at the Harris Theater.

Gier co-hosts a podcast, “Hearing the Music”, with Reverend J. Mark Bertrand that offers musical and theological considerations of sacred classical repertoire. Its first season comprises a series of discussions of Bach's St John Passion using musical examples recorded at the South Dakota Symphony Orchestra's 2014 performance of the oratorio. In 2020, South Dakota Public Broadcasting aired the series statewide under the heading “Sacred Music: A Lenten Special”.

== Awards ==
In 2012, Gier received ASCAP's John S. Edwards Award for Strongest Commitment to New American Music.

In 2020, Gier was inducted into the South Dakota Hall of Fame.

Gier is the recipient of Columbia University's 2022 Ditson Conductor's Award.

== Discography ==
Gier has conducted on the following recordings:

- John Luther Adams: An Atlas of Deep Time (2023), South Dakota Symphony Orchestra (Cantaloupe Music, Taiga Press)
- Lakota Music Project (2022), South Dakota Symphony Orchestra, Creekside Singers, Bryan Akipa, Stephen L. Bryant (innova Recordings)
- "String Quartet 'The Hako' (World Premiere Recording)" (2021), Dakota String Quartet (producer), in Arthur Farwell: America’s Neglected Composer (Naxos)
- Topaz Under the Moon (2001), Brooklyn Jazz Composers Orchestra
- Kievman: Symphony No. 2(42) (1996), Polish National Radio Symphony Orchestra – Katowice, Polish Radio Choir of Kraków (New Albion Records, Inc)
- Kievman: Symphony No. 3 (hurricane) (1996), Polish National Radio Symphony Orchestra (Mystery Park Arts Records)
