= Paul Sperry (lyric tenor) =

American lyric tenor (1934–2024)

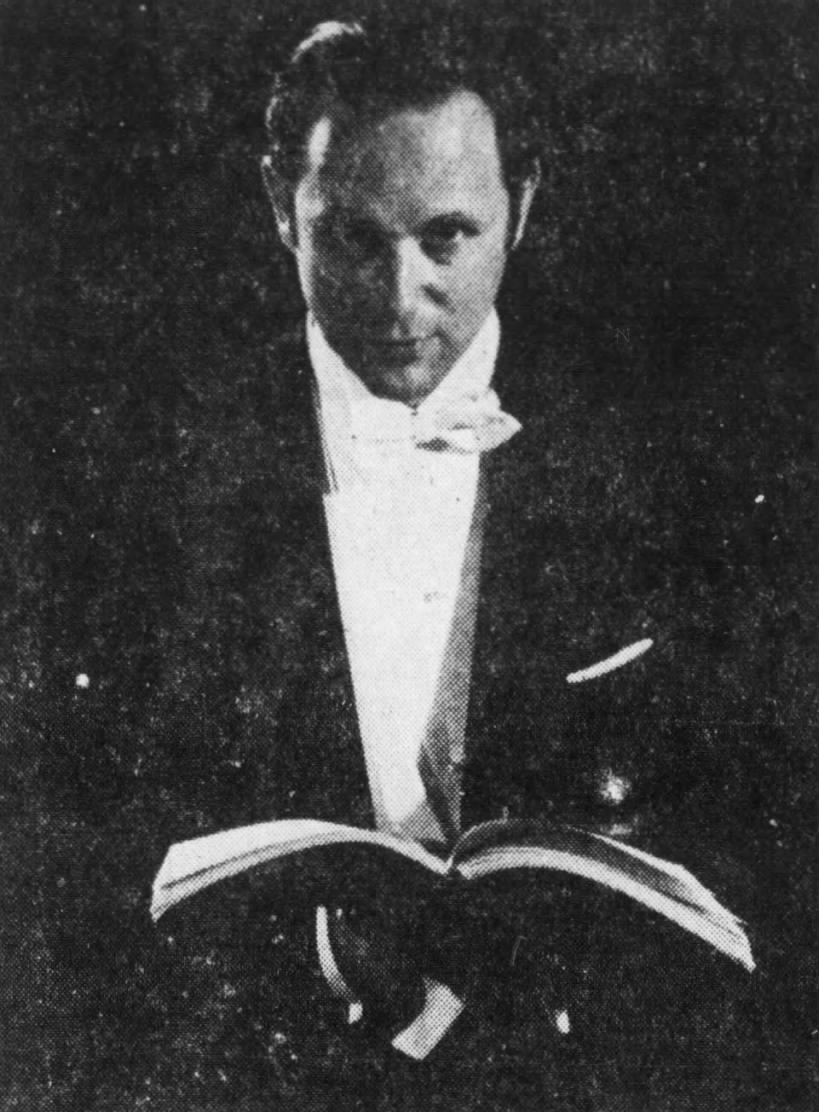
- Sperry in 1976
- Born: Paul John Sperry; April 14, 1934; Chicago, Illinois, U.S.
- Died: June 13, 2024 (aged 90); Manhattan, New York, U.S.
- Education: Harvard University
- Occupation: Lyric tenor

Paul John Sperry (April 14, 1934 – June 13, 2024) was an American lyric tenor. He was known for performing classical and contemporary music at numerous theaters and concerts.

== Life and career ==
Sperry was born in Chicago on April 14, 1934. He earned his B.S. and M.S. degrees at Harvard University. He was a lyric tenor and a recitalist.

Sperry was a faculty member at Juilliard School during the 1980s and taught at Manhattan School of Music until the time of his death.

Sperry died of heart failure in Manhattan, on June 13, 2024, at the age of 90.
