= Theories about Alexander the Great in the Quran =

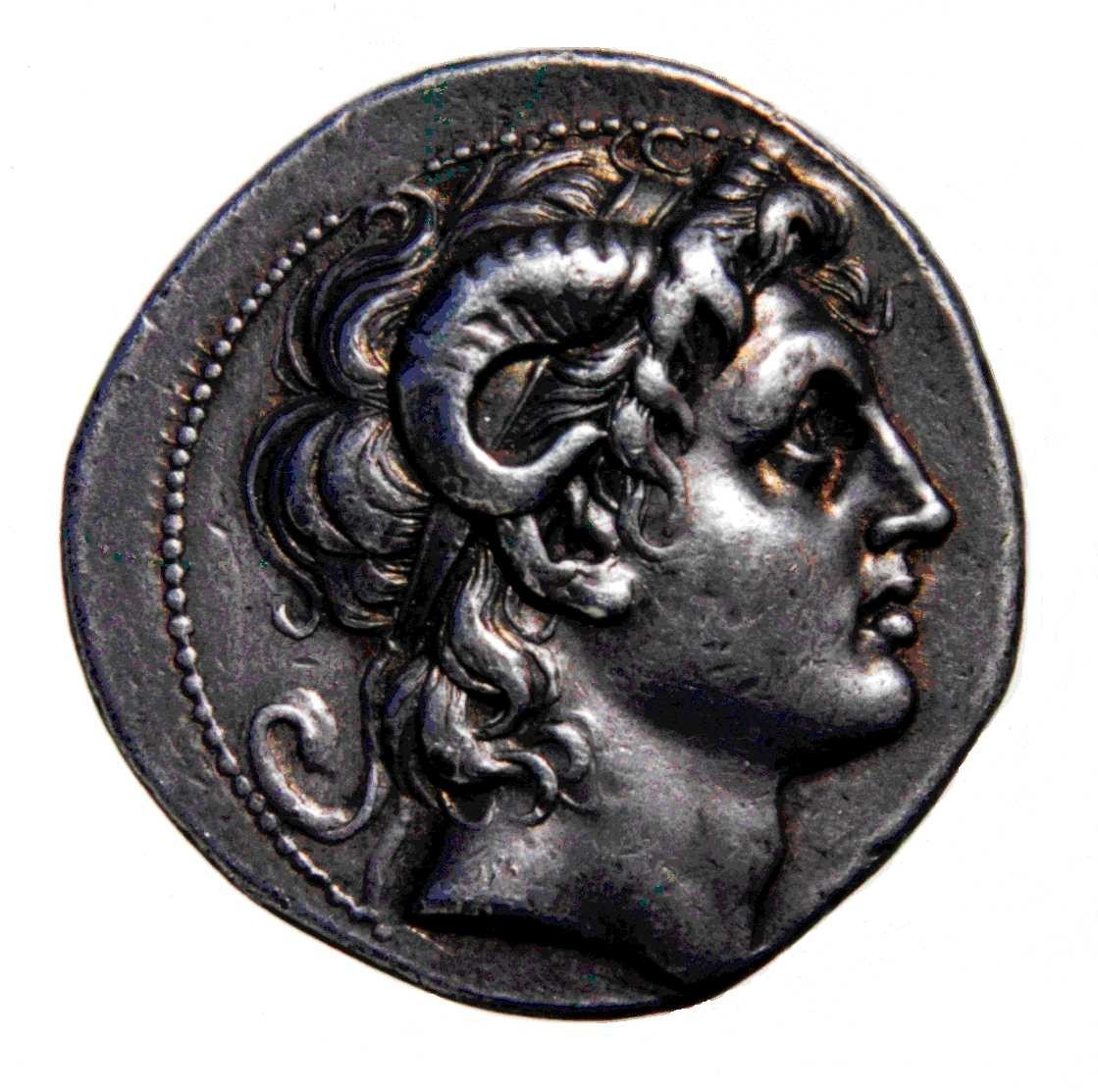
Silver tetradrachm of Alexander the Great shown wearing the horns of the ram-god Zeus-Ammon.

The story of Dhu al-Qarnayn (in Arabic ذو القرنين, literally "The Two-Horned One"; also transliterated as Zul-Qarnain or Zulqarnain), is mentioned in Surah al-Kahf of the Quran.

It has long been recognised in modern scholarship that the story of Dhu al-Qarnayn has strong similarities with the Syriac Legend of Alexander the Great. According to this legend, Alexander travelled to the ends of the world then built a wall in the Caucasus Mountains to keep Gog and Magog out of civilized lands (the latter element is found several centuries earlier in the works of Flavius Josephus). Several argue that the form of this narrative in the Syriac Alexander Legend (known as the Neṣḥānā) dates to between 629 and 636 CE and so is not the source for the Quranic narrative based on the view held by many Western and Muslim scholars that Surah 18 belongs to the second Meccan Period (615–619). The Syriac Legend of Alexander has however received a range of dates by different scholars, from a latest date of 630 (close to Muhammad's death) to an earlier version inferred to have existed in the 6th century CE. Sidney H. Griffith argues that the simple storyline found in the Syriac Alexander Legend (and the slightly later metrical homily or Alexander poem) "would most likely have been current orally well before the composition of either of the Syriac texts in writing" and it is possible that it was this orally circulating version of the account which was recollected in the Islamic milieu.

== Alexander the Great ==
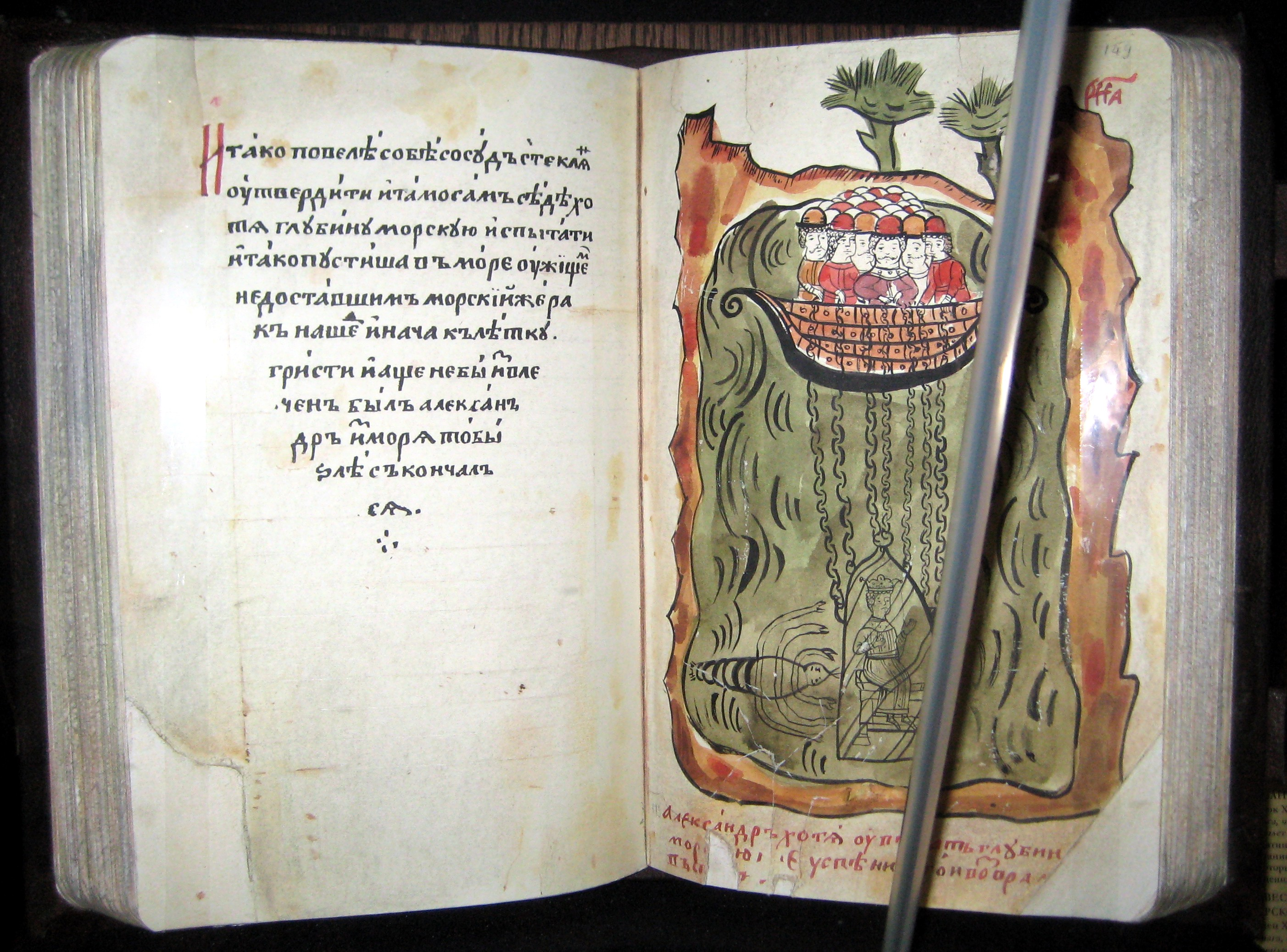
17th-century manuscript of an Alexandrine novel (Russia): Alexander exploring the depths of the sea

=== Alexander in legend and romance ===
Alexander the Great was an immensely popular figure in the classical and post-classical cultures of the Mediterranean and Middle East. Almost immediately after his death in 323 BC a body of legend began to accumulate about his exploits and life which, over the centuries, became increasingly fantastic as well as allegorical. Collectively this tradition is called the Alexander romance and some recensions feature such vivid episodes as Alexander ascending through the air to Paradise, journeying to the bottom of the sea in a glass bubble, and journeying through the Land of Darkness in search of the Water of Life (Fountain of Youth).

The earliest Greek manuscripts of the Alexander romance, as they have survived, indicate that it was composed at Alexandria in the 3rd century. The original text was lost but was the source of some eighty different versions written in twenty-four different languages. As the Alexander romance persisted in popularity over the centuries, it was assumed by various neighbouring people. Of particular significance was its incorporation into Jewish and later Christian legendary traditions. In the Jewish tradition Alexander was initially a figure of satire, representing the vain or covetous ruler who is ignorant of larger spiritual truths. Yet their belief in a just, all-powerful God forced Jewish interpreters of the Alexander tradition to come to terms with Alexander's undeniable temporal success. Why would a just, all-powerful God show such favour to an unrighteous ruler? This theological need, plus acculturation to Hellenism, led to a more positive Jewish interpretation of the Alexander legacy. In its most neutral form this was typified by having Alexander show deference to either the Jewish people or the symbols of their faith. In having the great conqueror thus acknowledge the essential truth of the Jews' religious, intellectual, or ethical traditions, the prestige of Alexander was harnessed to the cause of Jewish ethnocentrism. Eventually Jewish writers would almost completely co-opt Alexander, depicting him as a righteous gentile or even a believing monotheist.

The Christianized peoples of the Near East, inheritors of both the Hellenic as well as Judaic strands of the Alexander romance, further theologized Alexander until in some stories he was depicted as a saint. The Christian legends turned the ancient Greek conqueror Alexander III into Alexander "the Believing King", implying that he was a believer in monotheism. Eventually elements of the Alexander romance were combined with Biblical legends such as Gog and Magog.

During the period of history during which the Alexander romance was written, little was known about the true historical Alexander the Great as most of the history of his conquests had been preserved in the form of folklore and legends. It was not until the Renaissance (1300–1600 AD) that the true history of Alexander III was rediscovered:

Since the death of Alexander the Great in 323 BC there has been no age in history, whether in the West or in the East, in which his name and exploits have not been familiar. And yet not only have all contemporary records been lost but even the work based on those records though written some four and a half centuries after his death, the Anabasis of Arrian, was totally unknown to the writers of the Middle Ages and became available to Western scholarship only with the Revival of Learning [the Renaissance]. The perpetuation of Alexander's fame through so many ages and amongst so many peoples is due in the main to the innumerable recensions and transmogrifications of a work known as the Alexander Romance or Pseudo-Callisthenes.

=== Dating and origins of the Alexander legends ===
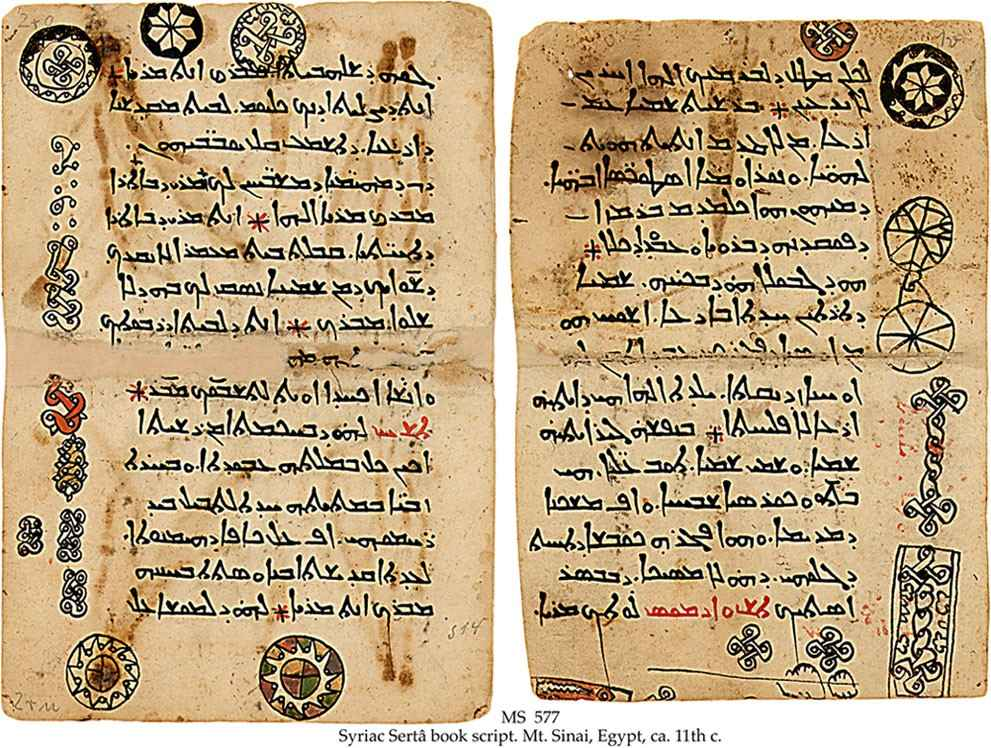
An 11th-century Syriac manuscript. The Syriac language is a dialect of Middle Aramaic that was once spoken across much of the Fertile Crescent. Classical Syriac became a major literary language throughout the Middle East from the 4th to the 8th centuries, the classical language of Edessa, preserved in a large body of Syriac literature. Syriac became the vehicle of Eastern Orthodox Christianity and culture, spreading throughout Asia. Before Arabic became the dominant language, Syriac was a major language among the Assyrian Christian communities of the Middle East and Central Asia. Several Syriac manuscripts of the Alexander romance exist, dating from the 7th century. The Greek–Syriac translators are generally credited with introducing the works of the ancient Greeks to pre-Islamic Arabia.

The legendary Alexander material originated as early as the time of the Ptolemaic dynasty (305 BC to 30 BC) and its unknown authors are sometimes referred to as the Pseudo-Callisthenes (not to be confused with Callisthenes of Olynthus, who was Alexander's official historian). The earliest surviving manuscript of the Alexander romance, called the α (alpha) recension, can be dated to the 3rd century AD and was written in Greek in Alexandria:

There have been many theories regarding the date and sources of this curious work [the Alexander romance]. According to the most recent authority, ... it was compiled by a Greco-Egyptian writing in Alexandria about A.D. 300. The sources on which the anonymous author drew were twofold. On the one hand he made use of a `romanticized history of Alexander of a highly rhetorical type depending on the Cleitarchus tradition, and with this he amalgamated a collection of imaginary letters derived from an Epistolary Romance of Alexander written in the first century B.C. He also included two long letters from Alexander to his mother Olympias and his tutor Aristotle describing his marvellous adventures in India and at the end of the World. These are the literary expression of a living popular tradition and as such are the most remarkable and interesting part of the work

The Greek variants of the Alexander romance continued to evolve until, in the 4th century, the Greek legend was translated into Latin by Julius Valerius Alexander Polemius (where it is called the Res gestae Alexandri Magni) and from Latin it spread to all major vernacular languages of Europe in the Middle Ages. Around the same as its translation into Latin, the Greek text was also translated into the Syriac language and from Syriac it spread to eastern cultures and languages as far afield as China and Southeast Asia. The Syriac legend was the source of an Arabic variant called the Qisas Dhul-Qarnayn (Tales of Dhul-Qarnayn) and a Persian variant called the Iskandarnamah (Book of Alexander), as well as Armenian and Ethiopic translations.

The Syriac manuscripts of the Alexander Romance contain evidence of lost texts. For example, there is some evidence of a lost pre-Islamic Arabic version of the translation that is thought to have been an intermediary between the Syriac Christian and the Ethiopic Christian translations. There is also evidence that the Syriac translation was not directly based on the Greek recensions but was based on a lost Middle Persian or (Neo-Persian) intermediary.

==== The Syriac Legend ====
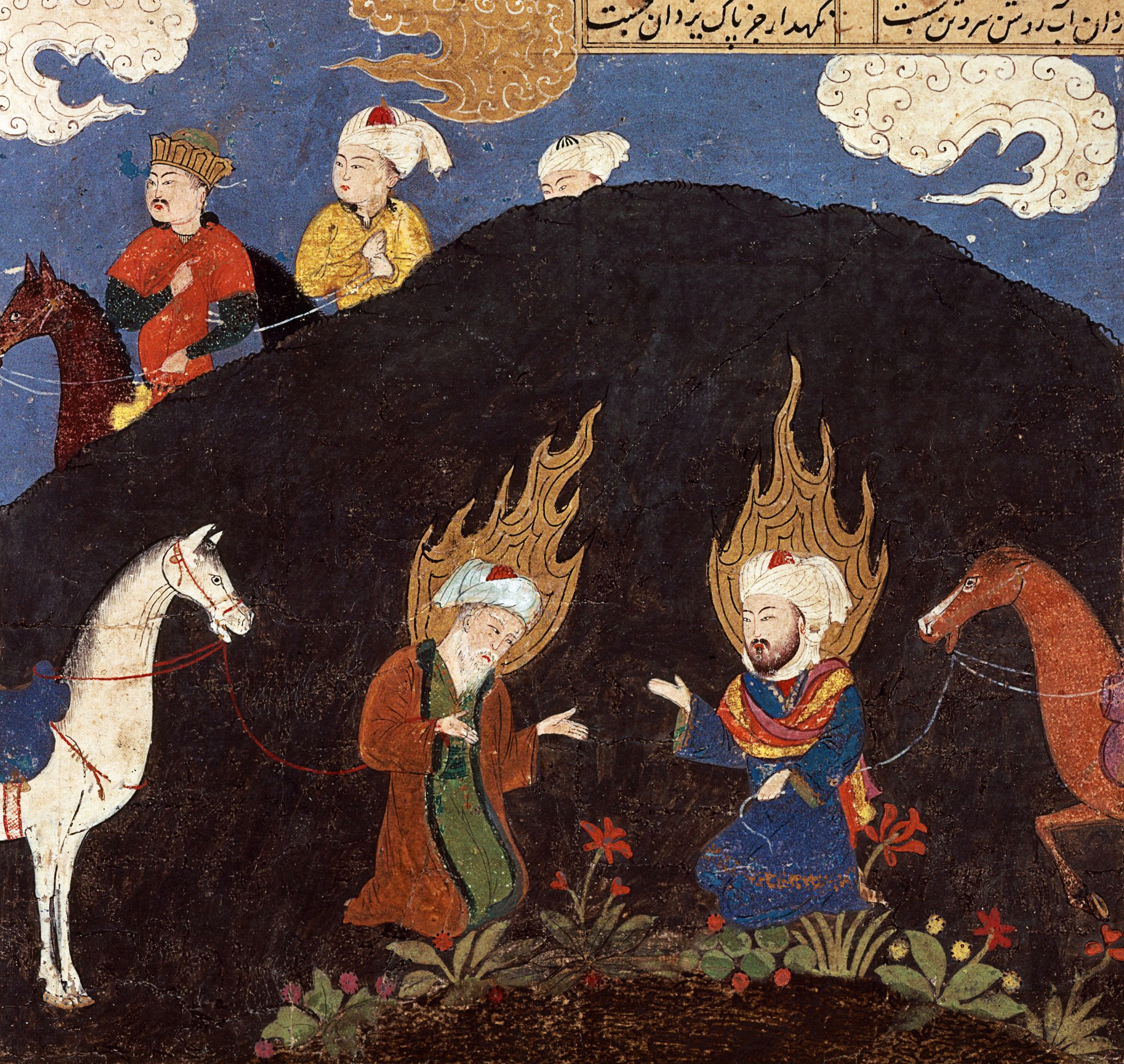
Persian miniature of Alexander (top left) visiting the fountain of Youth and meeting Khidr and Ilyas there

The version recorded in Syriac is of particular importance because it was current in the Middle East during the time of the Quran's writing and is regarded as being closely related to the literary and linguistic origins of the story of Dhul-Qarnayn in the Quran. The Syriac version of the Alexander Romance (or Pseudo-Callisthenes), as it has survived, consists of six distinct manuscripts, each including separately a Syriac Christian religious legend concerning Alexander in prose text called the Neṣḥānā d-Aleksandrōs or "Exploits of Alexander", often referred to simply as the Syriac Legend or Syriac Christian Legend, and based on it, a sermon known as the metrical homily (mēmrā), or Alexander song or poem ascribed to the Syriac poet-theologian Jacob of Serugh (451–521 AD, also called Mar Jacob), which according to Reinink was actually composed around 629–636. The Syriac Legend appears in each of the six manuscripts containing the Syriac version of the Alexander Romance A key manuscript witness is British Library Add. 25875 (copied 1708–1709), which is the oldest and one of the five used by E. A. W. Budge, who used it as the base text for his critical edition of the Syriac text and English translation of the Legend. The slightly later Metrical Homily (mēmrā) survives in five manuscripts, the oldest of which was copied in the 9th century CE. The Syriac Legend concentrates on Alexander's journey to the end of the World, where he constructs the Gates of Alexander to enclose the evil nations of Gog and Magog, while the Metrical Homily describes his journey to the Land of Darkness to discover the Water of Life (Fountain of Youth), as well as his enclosure of Gog and Magog. These legends concerning Alexander are remarkably similar to the story of Dhul-Qarnayn found in the Quran.

The Syriac Legend has been generally dated to between 629 AD and 636 AD. There is evidence in the legend of "ex eventu knowledge of the Khazar invasion of Armenia in A.D. 629", which suggests that the legend must have been burdened with additions by a redactor sometime around 629 AD. The legend appears to have been composed as propaganda in support of Emperor Heraclius (575–641 AD) shortly after he defeated the Persians in the Byzantine-Sassanid War of 602–628. It is notable that this manuscript fails to mention the Islamic conquest of Jerusalem in 636 AD by Muhammad's (570–632 AD) successor, Caliph Umar (590–644 AD). This fact means that the legend might have been recorded before the "cataclysmic event" that was the Muslim conquest of Syria and the resulting surrender of Jerusalem in November 636 AD. That the Byzantine–Arab Wars would have been referenced in the legend, had it been written after 636 AD, is supported by the fact that in 692 AD a Syriac Christian adaption of the Alexander romance called the Apocalypse of Pseudo-Methodius was indeed written as a response to the Muslim invasions and was falsely attributed to St Methodius (d. 311 AD); this Apocalypse of Pseudo-Methodius equated the evil nations of Gog and Magog with the Muslim invaders and shaped the eschatological imagination of Christendom for centuries. The Syriac Apocalypse of Pseudo-Methodius shows obvious borrowing from the Syriac Legend for its account concerning the barrier against Gog and Magog (especially its description of the Huns as chiefs of thirty eschatological nations), while the Syriac Apocalypse of Pseudo-Ephrem (dated between 642 and 683 CE) shows borrowing from both the Syriac Legend and the Alexander Poem (i.e. the Metrical Homily).

One scholar (Kevin van Bladel) who finds striking similarities between the Quranic verses 18:83-102 and the Syriac legend in support of Emperor Heraclius, dates the work to 629–630 AD or before Muhammad's death, not 629–636 AD. The Syriac legend matches many details in the five parts of the verses (Alexander being the two horned one, journey to edge of the world, punishment of evil doers, Gog and Magog, etc.) and also "makes some sense of the cryptic Qur'anic story" being 21 pages (in one edition) not 20 verses. (The sun sets in a fetid poisonous ocean—not spring—surrounding the earth, Gog and Magog are Huns, etc.) Van Bladel finds it more plausible that the Syriac legend is the source of the Quranic verses than vice versa, both for linguistic reasons as well as because the Syriac legend was written before the Arab conquests when the Hijazi Muslim community was still remote from and little known to the Mesopotamian site of the legend's creation, whereas Arabs worked as troops and scouts for during the Byzantine–Sasanian War of 602–628 and could have been exposed to the legend.

Stephen Shoemaker, commenting on the views of Reinink, van Bladel, and Tesei, argues it more likely that most of the text of the current version of the legend existed in a sixth century version, given the stringent timings otherwise required for the legend to influence the Syriac metrical homily and Quranic versions, and the difficulty of otherwise explaining the presence of the first ex-eventu prophecy about the Sabir Hun invasion of 515 CE in the legend, which was already circulating as an apocalyptic revelation in John of Ephesus's Lives of the Eastern Saints in the sixth century CE.

==== Search for the water of life ====
Besides the Dhul Qarnayn episode, Surah al-Kahf contains another story which has been connected with legends in the Alexander romance tradition. Tommaso Tesei notes that the story of Alexander's search at the ends of the world for the water of life, featuring his cook and a fish, which appears in various forms in the Syriac metrical homily about Alexander mentioned above, recension β of the Alexander romance (4th/5th century) and in the Babylonian Talmud (Tamid 32a–32b), is "almost unanimously" considered by western scholars to be behind the story of Moses journeying to the junction of the two seas, his servant and the escaped fish earlier in Surah al-Kahf, verses 18:60–65. Besides the full English translation by E. A. W. Budge of both the Metrical Homily and the Syriac Legend, an English translation of the relevant part of the Metrical Homily is available in Gabriel Said Reynolds' commentary on the Quran.

== Philological evidence ==
=== The two-horned one ===
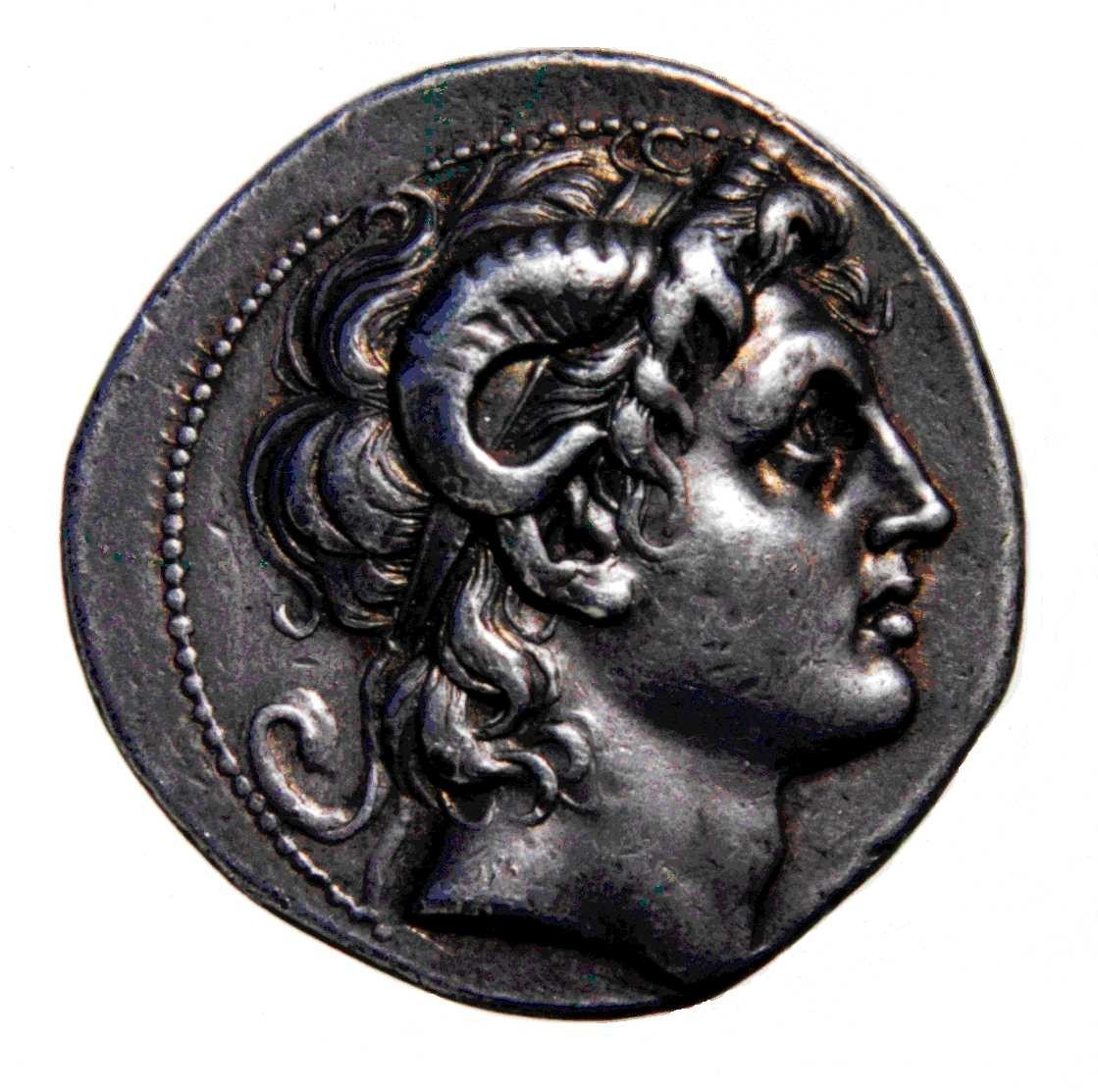
Silver tetradrachmon (ancient Greek coin) issued in the name of Alexander the Great, depicting Alexander with the horns of Ammon-Ra (242/241 BC, posthumous issue). Displayed at the British Museum.

The literal translation of the Arabic phrase "Dhu al-Qarnayn", as written in the Quran, is "the two-horned man". Alexander the Great was portrayed in his own time with horns following the iconography of the Egyptian god Ammon-Ra, who held the position of transcendental, self-created creator deity "par excellence". Rams were a symbol of virility due to their rutting behaviour; the horns of Ammon may have also represented the East and West of the Earth, and one of the titles of Ammon was "the two-horned". Alexander was depicted with the horns of Ammon as a result of his conquest of ancient Egypt in 332 BC, where the priesthood received him as the son of the god Ammon, who was identified by the ancient Greeks with Zeus, the King of the Gods. The combined deity Zeus-Ammon was a distinct figure in ancient Greek mythology. According to five historians of antiquity (Arrian, Curtius, Diodorus, Justin, and Plutarch), Alexander visited the Oracle of Ammon at Siwa in the Libyan desert and rumours spread that the Oracle had revealed Alexander's father to be the deity Ammon, rather than Philip. Alexander is said by some to have been convinced of his own divinity:

He seems to have become convinced of the reality of his own divinity and to have required its acceptance by others ... The cities perforce complied, but often ironically: the Spartan decree read, "Since Alexander wishes to be a god, let him be a god."

Ancient Greek coins, such as the coins minted by Alexander's successor Lysimachus (360–281 BC), depict the ruler with the distinctive horns of Ammon on his head. Archaeologists have found a large number of different types of ancients coins depicting Alexander the Great with two horns. The 4th century BC silver tetradrachmon ("four drachma") coin, depicting a deified Alexander with two horns, replaced the 5th century BC Athenian silver tetradrachmon (which depicted the goddess Athena) as the most widely used coin in the Greek world. After Alexander's conquests, the drachma was used in many of the Hellenistic kingdoms in the Middle East, including the Ptolemaic kingdom in Alexandria. The Arabic unit of currency known as the dirham, known from pre-Islamic times up to the present day, inherited its name from the drachma. In the late 2nd century BC, silver coins depicting Alexander with ram horns were used as a principal coinage in Arabia and were issued by an Arab ruler by the name of Abi'el who ruled in the south-eastern region of the Arabian Peninsula.

7th century CE stele depicting Alexander the Great with horns discovered in 2018. Published by the Department of Antiquities, Cyprus.

In 2018, excavations led by Dr. Eleni Procopiou at Katalymata ton Plakoton, an Early Byzantine site within the Akrotiri Peninsula on Cyprus, discovered a 7th Century CE depiction of Alexander the Great with horns. Known as the "Alexander-Heraclius Stele". Professor Sean Anthony regards it as significant, providing "seventh-century Byzantine iconography of Alexander with two horns that is contemporary with the Qurʾan"

In 1971, Ukrainian archeologist B. M. Mozolevskii discovered an ancient Scythian kurgan (burial mound) containing many treasures. The burial site was constructed in the 4th century BC near the city of Pokrov and is given the name Tovsta Mohyla (another name is Babyna Mogila). Amongst the artifacts excavated at this site were four silver gilded phalera (ancient Roman military medals). Two of the four medals are identical and depict the head of a bearded man with two horns, while the other two medals are also identical and depict the head of a clean-shaven man with two horns. According to a recent theory, the bearded figure with horns is actually Zeus-Ammon and the clean-shaved figure is none other than Alexander the Great.

Alexander has also been identified, since ancient times, with the horned figure in the Old Testament in the prophecy of Daniel 8 who overthrows the kings of Media and Persia. In the prophecy, Daniel has a vision of a ram with two long horns and verse 20 explains that "The ram which thou sawest having two horns is the kings of Media and Persia":

Josephus [37–100 AD], in his Antiquities of the Jews xi, 8, 5 tells of a visit that Alexander is purported to have made to Jerusalem, where he met the high priest Jaddua and the assembled Jews, and was shown the book of Daniel in which it was prophesied that some one of the Greeks would overthrow the empire of Persia. Alexander believed himself to be the one indicated, and was pleased. The pertinent passage in Daniel would seem to be VIII. 3–8 which tells of the overthrow of the two-horned ram by the one-horned goat, the one horn of the goat being broken in the encounter ... The interpretation of this is given further ... "The ram which thou sawest that had the two horns, they are the kings of Media and Persia. And the rough he-goat is the king of Greece." This identification is accepted by the church fathers ...

The Christian Syriac version of the Alexander romance, in the sermon by Jacob of Serugh, describes Alexander as having been given horns of iron by God. The legend describes Alexander (as a Christian king) bowing himself in prayer, saying:

O God ... I know in my mind that thou hast exalted me above all kings, and thou hast made me horns upon my head, wherewith I might thrust down the kingdoms of the world ... I will magnify thy name, O Lord, forever ... And if the Messiah, who is the Son of God [Jesus], comes in my days, I and my troops will worship Him ...

While the Syriac Legend references the horns of Alexander, it consistently refers to the hero by his Greek name, not using a variant epithet. The use of the Islamic epithet "Dhu al-Qarnayn", the "two-horned", first occurred in the Quran.

In Christian Alexander legends written in Ethiopic (an ancient South Semitic language) between the 14th and the 16th century, Alexander the Great is always explicitly referred to using the epithet the "Two Horned". A passage from the Ethiopic Christian legend describes the Angel of the Lord calling Alexander by this name:

Then God, may He be blessed and exalted! put it into the heart of the Angel to call Alexander 'Two-horned', ... And Alexander said unto him, "Thou didst call me by the name Two-horned, but my name is Alexander ... and I thought that thou hadst cursed me by calling me by this name." The angel spake unto him, saying, "O man, I did not curse thee by the name by which thou and the works that thou doest are known. Thou hast come unto me, and I praise thee because, from the east to the west, the whole earth hath been given unto thee ..."

References to Alexander's supposed horns are found in literature ranging many different languages, regions and centuries:

The horns of Alexander ... have had a varied symbolism. They represent him as a god, as a son of a god, as a prophet and propagandist of the Most High, as something approaching the role of a messiah, and also as the champion of Allah. They represent him as a world conqueror, who subjugated the two horns or ends of the world, the lands of the rising and of the setting sun ...

For these reasons, among others, the Quran's Arabic epithet "Dhul-Qarnayn", literally meaning "the two-horned one", is interpreted as a reference to Alexander the Great.

=== Alexander's Wall ===
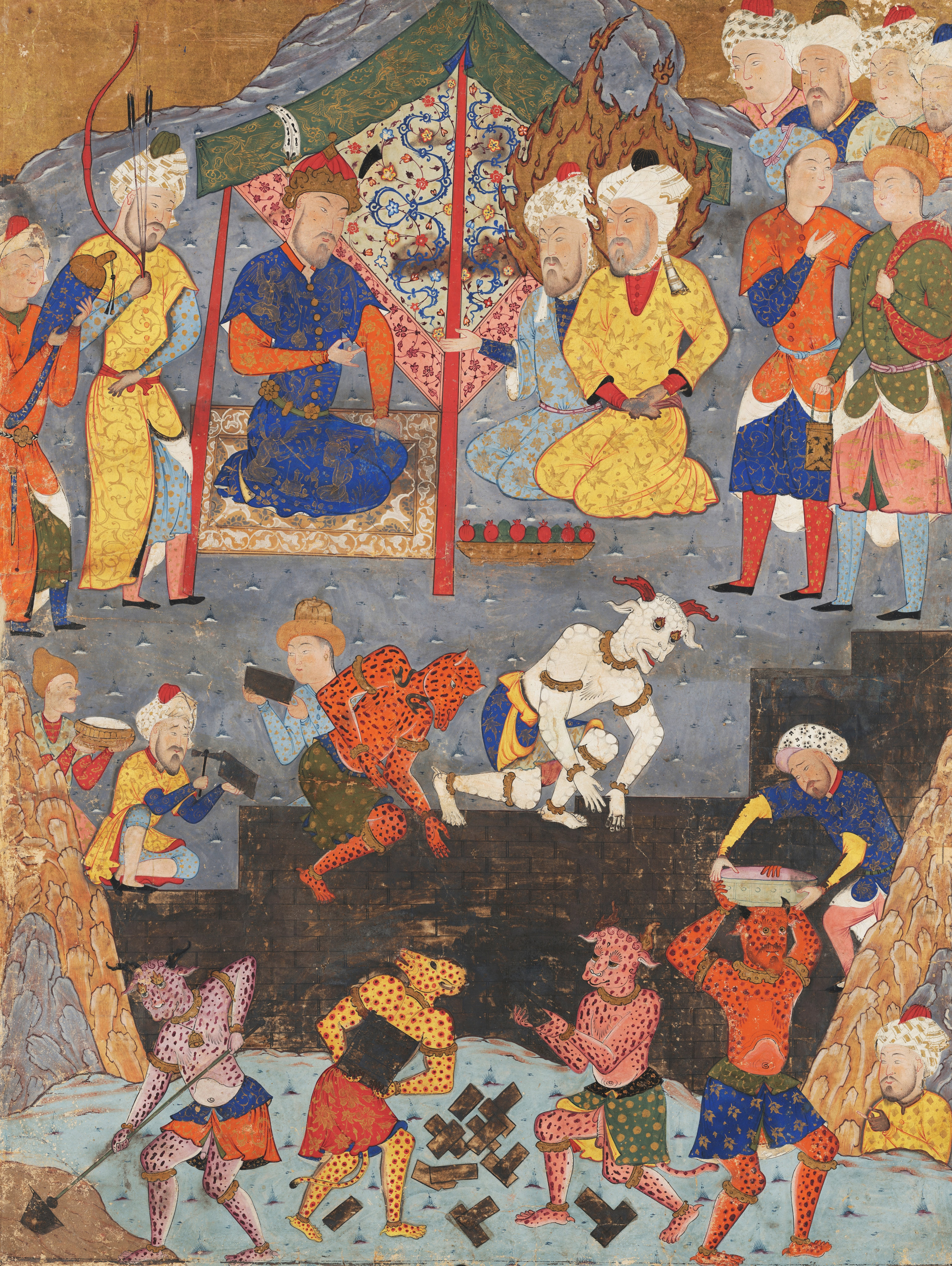
A Persian painting from the 16th century illustrating the building of the wall with the help of the jinn

==== Early accounts of Alexander's Wall ====
The building of gates in the Caucasus Mountains by Alexander to repel the barbarian peoples identified with Gog and Magog has ancient provenance and the wall is known as the Gates of Alexander, or the Caspian Gates. The name Caspian Gates originally applied to the narrow region at the southeast corner of the Caspian Sea, through which Alexander actually marched in the pursuit of Bessus in 329 BC, although he did not stop to fortify it. It was transferred to the passes through the Caucasus, on the other side of the Caspian, by the more fanciful historians of Alexander. The Jewish historian Flavius Josephus (37–100 AD) mentions that:

... a nation of the Alans, whom we have previously mentioned elsewhere as being Scythians ... travelled through a passage which King Alexander [the Great] shut up with iron gates.

Josephus also records that the people of Magog, the Magogites, were synonymous with the Scythians. According to Andrew Runni Anderson, this merely indicates that the main elements of the story were already in place six centuries before the Quran's revelation, not that the story itself was known in the cohesive form apparent in the Quranic account. Similarly, St. Jerome (347–420 AD), in his Letter 77, mentions that,

The hordes of the Huns had poured forth all the way from Maeotis (they had their haunts between the icy Tanais and the rude Massagetae, where the gates of Alexander keep back the wild peoples behind the Caucasus).

In his Commentary on Ezekiel (38:2), Jerome identifies the nations located beyond the Caucasus mountains and near Lake Maeotis as Gog and Magog. Thus the Gates of Alexander legend was combined with the legend of Gog and Magog from the Book of Revelation. It has been suggested that the incorporation of the Gog and Magog legend into the Alexander romance was prompted by the invasion of the Huns across the Caucasus mountains in 395 AD into Armenia and Syria.

==== Alexander's Wall in Christian legends ====
Christian legends speak of the Caspian Gates (Gates of Alexander), also known as Alexander's wall, built by Alexander the Great in the Caucasus mountains. Several variations of the legend can be found. In the story, Alexander the Great built a gate of iron between two mountains, at the end of the Earth, to prevent the armies of Gog and Magog from ravaging the plains. The Christian legend was written in Syria shortly before the Quran's writing and closely parallels the story of Dhul-Qarnayn. The legend describes an apocryphal letter from Alexander to his mother, wherein he writes:

I petitioned the exalted Deity, and he heard my prayer. And the exalted Deity commanded the two mountains and they moved and approached each other to a distance of twelve ells, and there I made ... copper gates 12 ells broad, and 60 ells high, and smeared them over within and without with copper ... so that neither fire nor iron, nor any other means should be able to loosen the copper; ... Within these gates, I made another construction of stones ... And having done this I finished the construction by putting mixed tin and lead over the stones, and smearing ... over the whole, so that no one might be able to do anything against the gates. I called them the Caspian Gates. Twenty and two Kings did I shut up therein.

These pseudepigraphic letters from Alexander to his mother Olympias and his tutor Aristotle, describing his marvellous adventures at the end of the World, date back to the original Greek recension α written in the 4th century in Alexandria. The letters are "the literary expression of a living popular tradition" that had been evolving for at least three centuries before the Quran was written.

==== Medieval accounts of Alexander's Wall ====
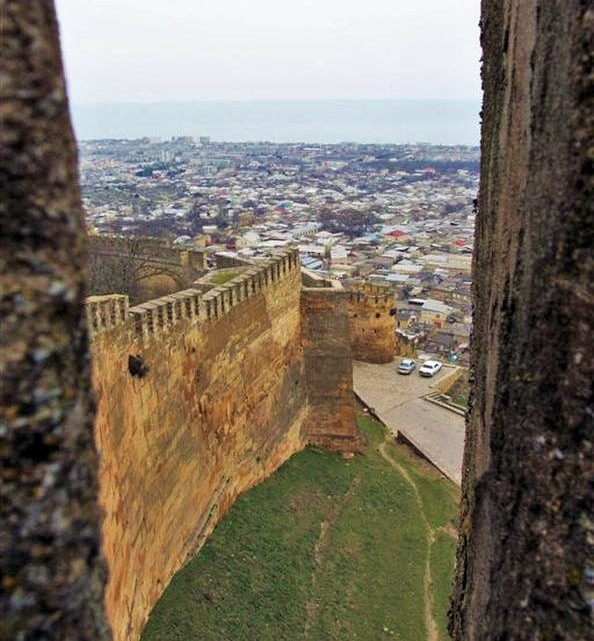
The wall of the citadel in Derbent, Russia. Built by the Sasanian kings, it was often identified with the "Gates of Alexander". The Caliph Umar, as well as later Caliphs, sent expeditions to Derbent to seek out this wall.

Several historical figures, both Muslim and Christian, searched for Alexander's Gate and several different identifications were made with actual walls. During the Middle Ages, the Gates of Alexander story was included in travel literature such as the Travels of Marco Polo (1254–1324 AD) and the Travels of Sir John Mandeville. The Alexander romance identified the Gates of Alexander, variously, with the Pass of Dariel, the Pass of Derbent, the Great Wall of Gorgan and even the Great Wall of China. In the legend's original form, Alexander's Gates are located at the Pass of Dariel. In later versions of the Christian legends, dated to around the time of Emperor Heraclius (575–641 AD), the Gates are instead located in Derbent, a city situated on a narrow strip of land between the Caspian Sea and the Caucasus mountains, where an ancient Sassanid fortification was mistakenly identified with the wall built by Alexander. In the Travels of Marco Polo, the wall in Derbent is identified with the Gates of Alexander. The Gates of Alexander are most commonly identified with the Caspian Gates of Derbent whose thirty north-looking towers used to stretch for forty kilometres between the Caspian Sea and the Caucasus Mountains, effectively blocking the passage across the Caucasus. Later historians would regard these legends as false:

The gate itself had wandered from the Caspian Gates to the pass of Dariel, from the pass of Dariel to the pass of Derbend [Derbent], as well as to the far north; nay, it had travelled even as far as remote eastern or north-eastern Asia, gathering in strength and increasing in size as it went, and actually carrying the mountains of Caspia with it. Then, as the full light of modern day come on, the Alexander Romance ceased to be regarded as history, and with it Alexander's Gate passed into the realm of fairyland.

In the Muslim world, several expeditions were undertaken to try to find and study Alexanders's wall, specifically the Caspian Gates of Derbent. An early expedition to Derbent was ordered by the Caliph Umar (586–644 AD) himself, during the Arab conquest of Armenia where they heard about Alexander's Wall in Derbent from the conquered Christian Armenians. Umar's expedition was recorded by the renowned exegetes of the Quran, Al-Tabarani (873–970 AD) and Ibn Kathir (1301–1373 AD), and by the Muslim geographer Yaqut al-Hamawi (1179–1229 AD):

Umar sent ... in 22 A.H. [643 AD] ... an expedition to Derbent [Russia] ... ʿAbdur Rahman [sic?] bin Rabiʿah [was appointed] as the chief of his vanguard. When ʿAbdur Rehman entered Armenia, the ruler Shehrbaz surrendered without fighting. Then when ʿAbdur Rehman wanted to advance towards Derbent, Shehrbaz [ruler of Armenia] informed him that he had already gathered full information about the wall built by Dhul-Qarnain, through a man, who could supply all the necessary details ...

Two hundred years later, the Abbasid Caliph Al-Wathiq (d. 847 AD) dispatched an expedition to study the wall of Dhul-Qarnain in Derbent, Russia. The expedition was led by Sallam-ul-Tarjuman, whose observations were recorded by Yaqut al-Hamawi and by Ibn Kathir:

... this expedition reached ... the Caspian territory. From there they arrived at Derbent and saw the wall [of Dhul-Qarnayn].

The Muslim geographer Yaqut al-Hamawi further confirmed the same view in a number of places in his book on geography; for instance under the heading "Khazar" (Caspian) he writes:

This territory adjoins the Wall of Dhul-Qarnain just behind Bab-ul-Abwab, which is also called Derbent.

The Caliph Harun al-Rashid (763–809 AD) even spent some time living in Derbent. Not all Muslim travellers and scholars, however, associated Dhul-Qarnayn's wall with the Caspian Gates of Derbent. For example, the Muslim explorer Ibn Battuta (1304–1369 AD) travelled to China on order of the Sultan of Delhi, Muhammad bin Tughluq and he comments in his travel log that "Between it [the city of Zaitun in Fujian] and the rampart of Yajuj and Majuj [Gog and Magog] is sixty days' travel." The translator of the travel log notes that Ibn Battuta confused the Great Wall of China with that supposedly built by Dhul-Qarnayn.

=== Gog and Magog ===
In the Quran, it is none other than the Gog and Magog people whom Dhul-Qarnayn has enclosed behind a wall, preventing them from invading the Earth. In Islamic eschatology, before the Day of Judgement Gog and Magog will destroy this gate, allowing them to ravage the Earth, as it is described in the Quran:

Until, when Gog and Magog are let loose [from their barrier], and they swiftly swarm from every mound. And the true promise [Day of Resurrection] shall draw near [of fulfilment]. Then [when mankind is resurrected from their graves], you shall see the eyes of the disbelievers fixedly stare in horror. [They will say,] "Woe to us! We were indeed heedless of this; nay, but we were wrongdoers."

— Quran 21:96–97. Note that the phrases in square brackets are not in the Arabic original.

==== Gog and Magog in Christian legends ====
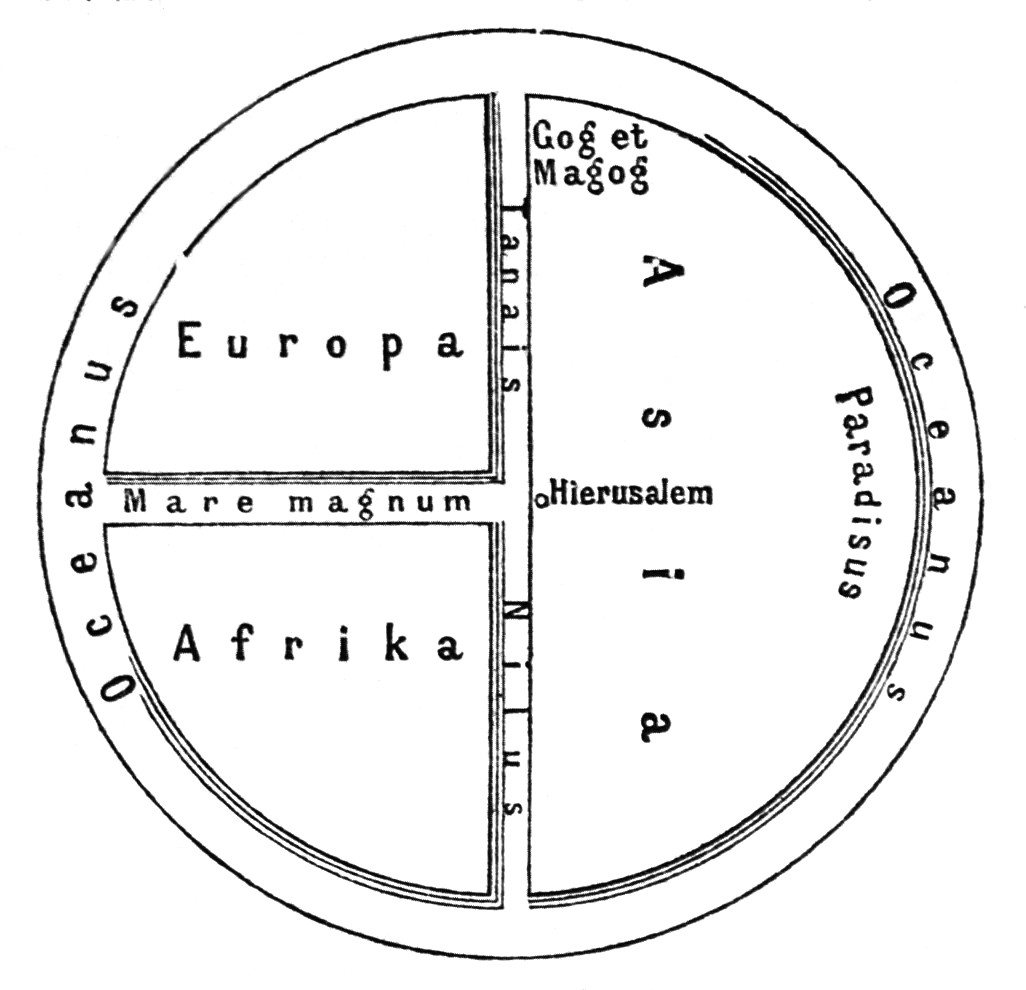
Example of a T-O map appearing in a German encyclopedia published by Joseph Meyer (1796-1856 AD). The T–O map was the first printed map in Europe. The map shows a disc shaped Earth surrounded by Oceanus, with the location Gog and Magog to the north, and Paropamisadae mountains (Hindu Kush) to the east in Asia. In the Christian legends, Alexander built the wall against Gog and Magog in the north, near the Caspian sea, and then went to the ends of the earth at the Paropamisadae, where it was supposed that the sun rises.

In the Syriac Christian legends, Alexander the Great encloses the Gog and Magog horde behind a mighty gate between two mountains, preventing Gog and Magog from invading the Earth. In addition, it is written in the Christian legend that in the end times God will cause the Gate of Gog and Magog to be destroyed, allowing the Gog and Magog horde to ravage the Earth;

The Lord spake by the hand of the angel, [saying] ...The gate of the north shall be opened on the day of the end of the world, and on that day shall evil go forth on the wicked ... The earth shall quake and this door [gate] which thou [Alexander] hast made be opened ... and anger with fierce wrath shall rise up on mankind and the earth ... shall be laid waste ... And the nations that is within this gate shall be roused up, and also the host of Agog and the peoples of Magog [Gog and Magog] shall be gathered together. These peoples, the fiercest of all creatures.

The Christian Syriac legend describes a flat Earth orbited by the sun and surrounded by the Paropamisadae (Hindu Kush) mountains. The Paropamisadae mountains are in turn surrounded by a narrow tract of land which is followed by a treacherous Ocean sea called Okeyanos. It is within this tract of land between the Paropamisadae mountains and Okeyanos that Alexander encloses Gog and Magog, so that they could not cross the mountains and invade the Earth. The legend describes "the old wise men" explaining this geography and cosmology of the Earth to Alexander, and then Alexander setting out to enclose Gog and Magog behind a mighty gate between a narrow passage at the end of the flat Earth:

The old men say, "Look, my lord the king, and see a wonder, this mountain which God has set as a great boundary." King Alexander the son of Philip said, "How far is the extent of this mountain?" The old men say, "Beyond India it extends in its appearance." The king said, "How far does this side come?" The old men say, "Unto all the end of the earth." And wonder seized the great king at the council of the old men ... And he had it in his mind to make there a great gate. His mind was full of spiritual thoughts, while taking advice from the old men, the dwellers in the land. He looked at the mountain which encircled the whole world ... The king said, "Where have the hosts [of Gog and Magog] come forth to plunder the land and all the world from of old?" They show him a place in the middle of the mountains, a narrow pass which had been constructed by God ...

Flat Earth beliefs in the Early Christian Church varied and the Fathers of the Church shared different approaches. Those of them who were more close to Aristotle and Plato's visions, like Origen, shared peacefully the belief in a spherical Earth. A second tradition, including St Basil and St Augustine, accepted the idea of the round Earth and the radial gravity, but in a critical way. In particular they pointed out a number of doubts about the antipodes and the physical reasons of the radial gravity. However, a flat Earth approach was more or less shared by all the Fathers coming from the Syriac area, who were more inclined to follow the letter of the Old Testament. Diodore of Tarsus (?–390 AD), Cosmas Indicopleustes (6th century), and Chrysostom (347–407 AD) belonged to this flat Earth tradition.

==== Prophecy about the Sabir Huns invasion (514 CE) ====
The first ex-eventu prophecy about Gog and Magog in the Syriac Christian Legend relates to the invasion of the Sabir Huns in 514–515 CE (immediately before the second ex-eventu prophecy about the Khazars discussed below). In a paper supporting van Bladel's thesis on the direct dependency of the Dhu'l Qarnayn story on the Syriac Legend, Tommaso Tesei nevertheless highlights Károly Czeglédy's identification that this first prophecy already had a 6th-century CE existence as an apocalytic revelation involving the arrival of the Huns in a passage of the Lives of the Eastern Saints by John of Ephesus (d. 586 ca.).

==== Prophecy about the Khazars invasion (627 CE) ====
In the Christian Alexander romance literature, Gog and Magog were sometimes associated with the Khazars, a Turkic people who lived near the Caspian Sea. The invasion of the Khazars around 627 CE appears in the Syriac Christian Legend as an ex-eventu prophecy involving the Huns (including Gog and Magog) passing through the gate and destroying the land, which gives the terminus post quem of 628 CE for its final redaction. In his 9th century work Expositio in Matthaeum Evangelistam, the Benedictine monk Christian of Stavelot refers to the Khazars as Hunnic descendants of Gog and Magog, and says they are "circumcised and observing all [the laws of] Judaism"; the Khazars were a Central Asian people with a long association with Judaism. A Georgian tradition, echoed in a chronicle, also identifies the Khazars with Gog and Magog, stating they are "wild men with hideous faces and the manners of wild beasts, eaters of blood".

Early Muslim scholars writing about Dhul-Qarnayn also associated Gog and Magog with the Khazars. Ibn Kathir (1301–1373 CE), the famous commentator of the Quran, identified Gog and Magog with the Khazars who lived between the Black and Caspian Sea in his work Al-Bidayah wa al-Nihayah (The Beginning and the End). The Muslim explorer Ahmad ibn Fadlan, in his travelogue regarding his diplomatic mission in 921 AD to Volga Bulgars (a vassal of the Khazarian Empire), noted the beliefs about Gog and Magog being the ancestors of the Khazars.

Thus Muslim scholars associated the Khazars with Dhul-Qarnayn just as the Christian legends associated the Khazars with Alexander the Great.

=== The rising place of the Sun ===
A peculiar aspect of the story of Dhul-Qarnayn, in the Quran, is that it describes Dhul-Qarnayn travelling to "the rising place of the Sun" and the "setting place of the Sun", where he saw the Sun sets into a murky (or boiling) spring of water (or mud). Dhul-Qarnayn also finds a people living by the "rising place of the Sun", and finds that these people somehow have "no shelter".

In his commentary of the Quran, Ibn Kathir (1301–1373 CE) explains that verse 18:89 is referring to the furthest point that could be travelled west:

(Until, when he reached the setting place of the sun,) means, he followed a route until he reached the furthest point that could be reached in the direction of the sun's setting, which is the west of the earth. As for the idea of his reaching the place in the sky where the sun sets, this is something impossible, and the tales told by storytellers that he traveled so far to the west that the sun set behind him are not true at all. Most of these stories come from the myths of the People of the Book [Jews and Christians] and the fabrications and lies of their heretics.

In this commentary Ibn Kathir differentiates between the end of the Earth and the supposed "place in the sky" where the sun sets (the "resting place" of the sun). Ibn Kathir contends that Dhul-Qarnayn did reach the farthest place that could be travelled west but not the "resting place" of the sun and he goes on to mention that the People of the Book (Jews and Christians) tell myths about Dhul-Qarnayn travelling so far beyond the end of the Earth that the sun was "behind him". This shows that Ibn Kathir was aware of the Christian legends and it suggests that Ibn Kathir considered Christian myths about Alexander to be referring to the same figure as the Dhul-Qarnayn mentioned in the Qu'an.

A similar theme is elaborated upon in several places in the Islamic hadith literature, in Sahih al-Bukhari and Sahih Muslim:

It is narrated ... that the Messenger of God one day said: Do you know where the sun goes? They replied: God and His Apostle know best. He (the Holy Prophet) observed: Verily it (the sun) glides till it reaches its resting place under the Throne [of God]. Then it falls prostrate and remains there until it is asked: Rise up and go to the place whence you came, and it goes back and continues emerging out from its rising place ...

The setting place of the sun is also commented on by Al-Tabari (838-923 AD) and Al-Qurtubi (1214–1273 AD) and, like Ibn Kathir, they showed some reservations towards the literal idea of the sun setting in a muddy spring but held to the basic theme of Dhul-Qarnayn reaching the ends of the Earth.

That the Earth must be spherical was known since at least the time of Pythagoras (570–495 BC), but this knowledge did not reach ancient folklore such as the Alexander romance where Alexander travels to the ends of a flat Earth. It is notable that, unlike the Babylonians, Greeks, and Indians, the pre-Islamic Arabs had no scientific astronomy. Their knowledge of astronomy was limited to measuring time based on empirical observations of the "rising and setting" of the sun, moon, and particular stars. This area of astronomical study was known as anwa and continued to be developed after Islamization by the Arabs. Astronomy in medieval Islam began in the 8th century and the first major Muslim work of astronomy was Zij al-Sindh written in 830 by al-Khwarizmi. The work is significant as it introduced the Ptolemaic system into Islamic sciences (the Ptolemaic system was ultimately replaced by the Copernican system during the Scientific Revolution in Europe).

==== The rising place of the Sun in the Alexander legends ====
Rendition of Homer's view of the world (prior to 900 BC). The Homeric conception of the world involved a flat, circular Earth, surrounded by mountains and by Oceanus, the world-ocean of classical antiquity, considered to be an enormous river encircling the world. The Sun emerges from underneath the Earth, travelling along the fixed dome of the sky, and is shown rising from Oceanus.

So the whole camp mounted, and Alexander and his troops went up between the fetid sea and the bright sea to the place where the Sun enters the window of heaven; for the Sun is the servant of the Lord, and neither by night nor by day does he cease from his travelling. The place of his rising is over the sea, and the people who dwell there, when he is about to rise, flee away and hide themselves in the sea, that they be not burnt by his rays; and he passes through the midst of the heavens to the place where he enters the window of heaven; and wherever he passes there are terrible mountains, and those who dwell there have caves hollowed out in the rocks, and as soon as they see the Sun passing [over them], men and birds flee away from before him and hide in the caves, for rocks are rent by his blazing heat and fall down, and whether they be men or beasts, as soon as the stones touch them they are consumed. And when the Sun enters the window of heaven, he straight away bows down and makes obeisance before God his Creator; and he travels and descends the whole night through the heavens, until at length he finds himself where he rises.

The Christian legend is much more detailed than the Quran's version and elaborates at length about the cosmology of the Earth that is implied by the story:

He [Alexander] said to them [the nobles]: "This thought has arisen in my mind, and I am wondering what is the extent of the earth, and how high the heavens are ... and upon what the heavens are fixed ... Now this I desire to go and see, upon what the heavens rest, and what surrounds all creation." The nobles answered and said to the king, ... "As to the thing, my lord, which thy majesty desires to go and see, namely, upon what the heavens rest, and what surrounds the earth, the terrible seas which surround the world will not give thee a passage; because there are eleven bright seas, on which the ships of men sail, and beyond these there is about ten miles of dry land, and beyond these ten miles there is the foetid sea, Okeyanos (the Ocean), which surrounds all creation. Men are not able to come near to this foetid sea ... Its waters are like poison and if men swim therein, they die at once."

This ancient motif of a legendary figure travelling to the end of Earth is also found in the Epic of Gilgamesh, which can be dated to c. 2000 BC, making it one of the earliest known works of literary writing. In the epic poem, in tablet nine, Gilgamesh sets out on a quest for the Water of Life to seek immortality. Gilgamesh travels far to the east, to the mountain passes at the ends of the earth where he grapples and slays monstrous mountain lions, bears and others. Eventually he comes to the twin peaks of Mount Mashu at the end of the earth, from where the sun rises from the other world, the gate of which is guarded by two terrible scorpion-beings. They allow him to proceed through the gate after Gilgamesh convinces them to let him pass, stating his divinity and desperation, and he travels through the dark tunnel where the sun travels every night. Just before the sun is about to catch up with him, and with the North Wind and ice lashing him, he reaches the end. The world at the end of the tunnel is a bright wonderland full of trees with leaves of jewels. The 17th chapter of the apocryphal Book of Enoch describes a journey to the far west where the fire of the west receives every setting of the sun and a river of fire empties into the great western sea. Chapters 72–80 describe the risings and settings of the sun through 12 portals of heaven in the east and west. The myth of a flat Earth surrounded by an Ocean into which the sun sets is also found in the Iliad, the famous epic poem written by Homer and dated to c. 900 BC. The story of creation in the Hebrew Bible, in Genesis 1:10, (dated c. 900–550 BC) is also considered by scholars to be describing a flat Earth surrounded by a sea.

The ancient Greek historian Herodotus (484–425 BC) also gave an account of the eastern "end of the Earth", in his descriptions of India. He reported that in India the sun's heat is extremely intense in the morning, instead of noon being the hottest time of day. It has been argued that he based this on his belief that since India is located at the extreme east of a flat Earth, it would only be logical if the morning were unbearably hot due to the sun's proximity.

=== Alexander's travels ===
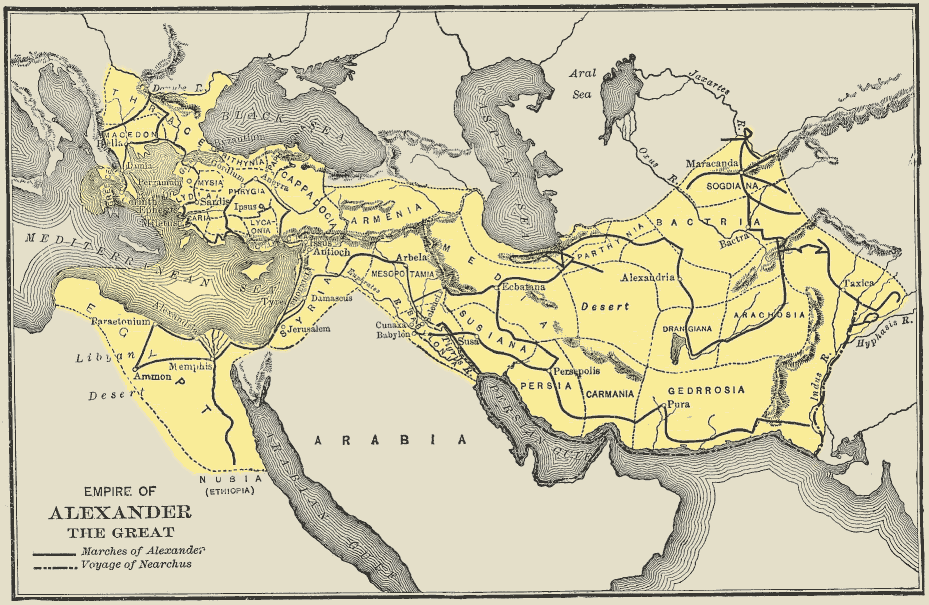
Map of Alexander's travels. Alexander never marched far west of his native Macedon and his advances eastward ended at the fringes of India.

The Quran and the Alexander romance both have it that Dhul-Qarnayn (or Alexander) travelled a great deal. In the Quran's story of Dhul-Qarnayn, "God gave him unto every thing a road" (or more literally, "We gave him the means of everything" 18:84) He travels as far as the ends of the Earth, to the place on the Earth where the Sun sets (the west) and the place on the Earth where the Sun rises (the east). The Quran portrays him travelling to the "setting of the sun". Muslim interpretations of these verses are varied, but classical Muslim scholars seemed to have been of the opinion that Dhul-Qarnayn's journey was real, not allegorical, and that Dhul-Qarnayn's wall is also a real, physical wall somewhere on Earth.

In the Christian legends, Alexander travels to the places of the setting and rising of the Sun and this is meant to say that he travelled to the ends of the flat Earth and thus he had traversed the entire world. This legendary account served to convey the theme of Alexander's exploits as a great conqueror. Alexander was indeed a great conqueror, having ruled the largest empire in ancient history by the time he was 25 years old. However, the true historical extent of Alexander's travels are known to be greatly exaggerated in legends. For example, legend has it that upon reaching India,

... said Alexander "Truly, then, all the inhabited world is mine. West, north, east, south, there is nothing more for me to conquer." Then he sat down and wept because there were not other worlds for him to conquer.

In reality, while Alexander did travel a great deal, he did not travel further west than ancient Libya and did not travel further east than the fringes of India. According to historians, Alexander invaded India following his desire to reach the "ends of the world and the Great Outer Sea". However, when he reached the Hyphasis River in the Punjab in 326 BC, his army nearly mutinied and refused to march further east, exhausted by years of campaigning. Alexander's desire to reach "the ends of the Earth" was instilled by his tutor Aristotle:

Alexander derived his concept of "Asia" from the teaching of Aristotle, for whom "the inhabited earth" was surrounded by "the Great sea" Ocean, and was divided into three areas – "Europe, Libya and Asia". Thus the earth was not round but flat, and "Asia" was limited on the west by the Tanais (Don), the inland sea and the Nile, and on the east by "India" and "the Great Sea" ... he was mistaken in supposing that from the ridge of the Paropamisadae (Hindu Kush) one would see "the outer sea" and that "India" was a small peninsula running east into that sea.

This view of the world taught by Aristotle and followed by Alexander is apparent in Aristotle's Meteorologica, a treatise on earth sciences where he discusses the "length" and "width" of "the inhabited earth". However, Aristotle knew that the Earth is spherical and even provided observational proof of this fact. Aristotle's cosmological view was that the Earth is round but he prescribed to the notion of an "inhabited Earth", surrounded by the Ocean, and an "uninhabited Earth" (though exactly how much of this was understood by his student Alexander the Great is not known).

== Arabic and Islamic depictions of Alexander the Great ==
=== Arabic traditions ===
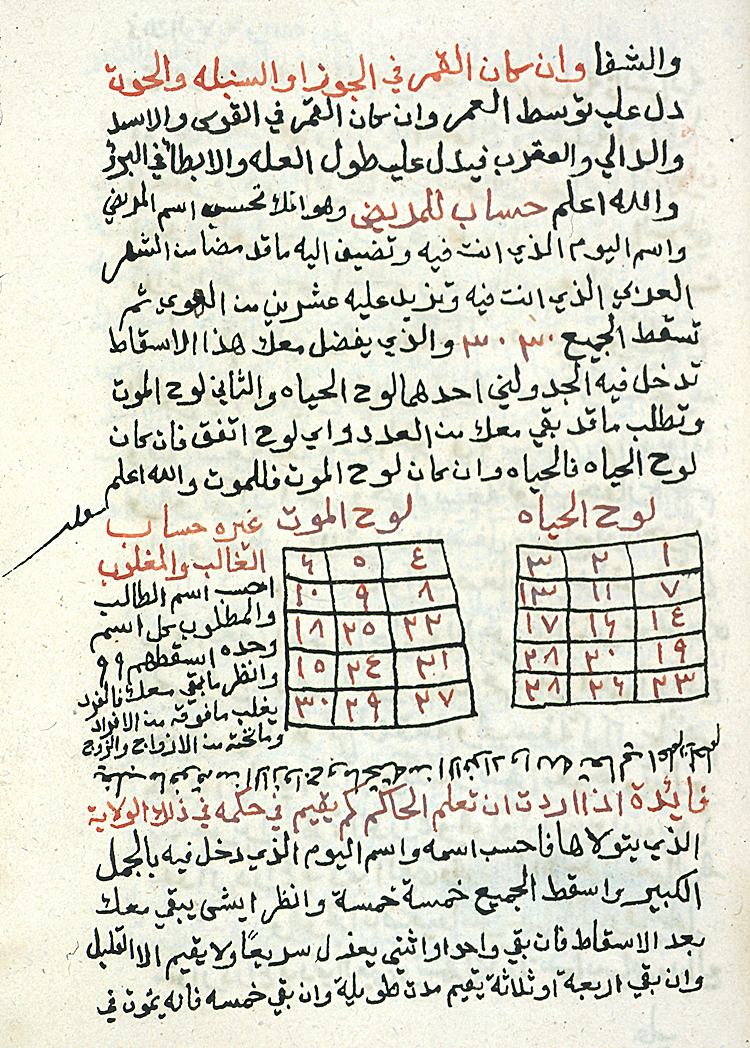
Manuscript of the 9th-century Arabic work Secretum Secretorum ("Secret of Secrets"), an encyclopedic treatise on a wide range of topics including physiognomy, astrology, alchemy, magic, and medicine. This work includes a series of supposed letters from Aristotle, addressed to Alexander. The Arabic manuscript was translated into Latin in the 12th century and was influential in Europe during the High Middle Ages

Alexander the Great features prominently in early Arabic literature. There are many surviving versions of the Alexander romance in Arabic that were written after the conquest of Islam. It is also thought that pre-Islamic Arabic versions of the Alexander romance may have existed.

Excavations in Eastern Arabia show that the ancient Arab dynasty 'Abiel' minted coins portraying Alexander the Great with horns.

The earliest surviving Arabic narrative of the Alexander romance was composed by Umara ibn Zayd (767–815 AD). In the tale, Alexander the Great travels a great deal, builds the Wall against Gog and Magog, searches for the Water of Life (Fountain of Youth), and encounters angels who give him a "wonder-stone" that both weighs more than any other stone but is also as light as dust. This wonder-stone is meant to admonish Alexander for his ambitions and indicate that his lust for conquest and eternal life will not end until his death. The story of the wonder-stone is not found in the Syriac Christian legend, but is found in Jewish Talmudic traditions about Alexander as well as in Persian traditions.

A South Arabian Alexander legend was written by the Yemenite traditionist Wahb ibn Munabbih (d. 732 AD) and this legend was later incorporated in a book by Ibn Hisham (d. 833 AD) regarding the history of the Himyarite Kingdom in ancient Yemen. In the Yemenite variation, Dhul-Qarnayn is identified with an ancient king of Yemen named Tubba', rather than Alexander the Great, but the Arabic story still describes the story of Alexander's Wall against Gog and Magog and his quest for the Water of Life. The story also mentions that Dhul-Qarnayn (Tubba') visited a castle with glass walls and visited the Brahmins of India. The South Arabian legend was composed within the context of the division between the South Arabs and North Arabs that began with the Battle of Marj Rahit in 684 AD and consolidated over two centuries.

The Alexander romance also had an important influence on Arabic wisdom literature. In Secretum Secretorum ("Secret of Secrets", in Arabic Kitab sirr al-asrar), an encyclopedic Arabic treatise on a wide range of topics such as statecraft, ethics, physiognomy, alchemy, astrology, magic and medicine, Alexander appears as a speaker and subject of wise sayings and as a correspondent with figures such as Aristotle. The origins of the treatise are uncertain. No Greek original exists, though there are claims in the Arabic treatise that it was translated from the Greek into Syriac and from Syriac into Arabic by a well-known 9th century translator, Yahya ibn al-Bitriq (d. 815 AD). It appears, however, that the treatise was actually composed originally in Arabic.

In another example of Arabic wisdom literature relating to Alexander, Ibn al-Nadim (d. 997 AD) refers to a work on divination titled The Drawing of Lots by Dhul-Qarnain and to a second work on divination by arrows titled The gift of Alexander, but only the titles of these works have survived.

Notably, the Abbasid Caliph Al-Mu'tasim (794–842 AD) had ordered the translation of the Thesaurus Alexandri, a work on elixirs and amulets, from Greek and Latin into Arabic. The Greek work Thesaurus Alexandri was attributed to Hermes (the great messenger of the gods in Greek mythology) and similarly contained supposed letters from Aristotle addressed to Alexander.

A more direct Arabic translation of the Alexander romance, called Sirat Al-Iskandar, was discovered in Constantinople, at the Hagia Sophia, and is dated to the 13th century. In this version, Alexander the Great has a divine mission to convert the whole world to monotheism, and constructs the famous wall confining Gog and Magog before setting out for the Land of Darkness to find the Water of Life. This version also includes the letter from Alexander to his mother about his travels in India and at the end of the World. It also includes features which occur exclusively in the Syriac version. The Arabic legend also retains certain pagan elements of the story, which are sometimes modified to suit the Islamic message:

It is quite remarkable that some characteristics belonging to a pre-Islamic 'pagan' entourage, have survived in the text ... For example, Alexander orders an offering of sacrificial animals at the temple of Hercules. In the Arabic letter the name of the deity has been replaced by Allah ... Another passage in the account of the palace of Shoshan or Sus, gives a description of the large silver jars, which were alleged to have capacity of three hundred and sixty measures of wine. Alexander puts this assertion to the test, having one of the jars filled with wine and poured out for his soldiers during a banquet. This exact specification has been maintained, heedless of the Islamic ban on the use of wine ... These retouched borrowings are highly significant in this text, because the Arabic Alexander figure is portrayed as a propagator of Islamic monotheism.

Another piece of Arabic Alexander literature is the Laments (or Sayings) of the Philosophers. These are a collection of remarks supposedly made by some philosophers gathered at the tomb of Alexander after his death. This legend was originally written in the 6th century in Syriac and was later translated into Arabic and expanded upon. The Laments of the Philosophers eventually gained enormous popularity in Europe:

[The 'Sayings of the Philosophers' are] remarks of the philosophers gathered at the tomb of Alexander, who utter a series of apophthegms on the theme of the brevity of life and the transience of human achievement ... a work entitled 'Sayings of the Philosophers' was first composed in Syriac in the sixth century; a longer Arabic version was composed by Hunayan Ibn Ishaq (809-973) the distinguished scholar-translator, and a still longer one by al-Mubashshir ibn Fatiq (who also wrote a book about Alexander) around 1053. Hunayan's version was translated into Spanish ... in the late thirteenth century.

The Arabic Alexander romance also had an influence on a wider range of Arabic literature. It has been noted that some features of the Arabic Alexander legends found their way into The Seven Voyages of Sinbad the Sailor, a medieval story-cycle of Arabic origin. Sinbad, the hero of the epic, is a fictional sailor from Basrah, living during the Abbasid Caliphate. During his voyages throughout the seas east of Africa and south of Asia, he has fantastic adventures going to magical places, meeting monsters, and encountering supernatural phenomena. As a separate example of this influence on Arabic literature, the legend of Alexander's search for the Water of Life is found in One Thousand and One Nights, a collection of Middle Eastern and South Asian stories and folktales compiled in Arabic during the Islamic Golden Age.

=== Andalusian traditions ===
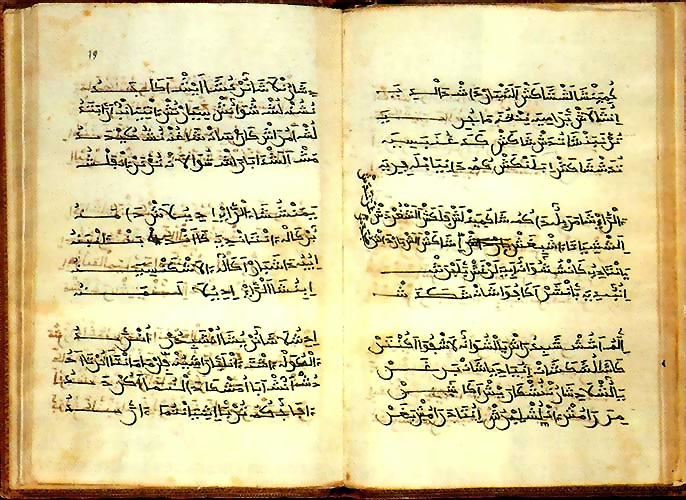
Manuscript of a 14th-century poem (Poema de Yuçuf) written in Aljamiado (Spanish and Mozarabic language transliterated in Arabic alphabet).

After the Umayyad Muslim conquest of Al-Andalus (Spain) in 711 AD, Muslim literature flourished under the Caliphate of Córdoba (929 to 1031 AD). An Arabic derivative of the Alexander romance was produced, called Qisas Dhul-Qarnayn (Tales of Dhul-Qarnayn). The material was later incorporated into Qisas Al-Anbiya (Tales of the Prophets):

By the turn of the first millennium C.E., the romance of Alexander in Arabic had a core centered on the Greek legendary material ... Interwoven later into this narrative in the Tales of the Prophets literature were episodes of an apparent Arab-Islamic elaboration: the construction of a great barrier to keep the people of Gog and Magog from harassing the people of the civilized world until Judgement Day, the voyage to the end of the Earth to witness the sun set in a pool of boiling mud, and Dhu al-Qarnayn's expedition into the Land of Darkness in search of the Fountain of Life accompanied by his companion Khidir ("the Green-One").

By 1236 AD, the Reconquista was essentially completed and Europeans had retaken the Iberian peninsula from the Muslims, but the Emirate of Granada, a small Muslim vassal of the Christian Kingdom of Castile, remained in Spain until 1492 AD. During the Reconquista, Muslims were forced to either convert to Catholicism or leave the peninsula. The descendants of Muslims who converted to Christianity were called the Moriscos (meaning "Moor-like") and were suspecting of secretly practicing Islam. The Moriscos used a language called Aljamiado, which was a dialect of the Spanish language (Mozarabic) but was written using the Arabic alphabet. Aljamiado played a very important role in preserving Islam and the Arabic language in the life of the Moriscos; prayers and the sayings of Muhammad were translated into Aljamiado transcriptions of the Spanish language, while keeping all Quranic verses in the original Arabic. During this period, a version of the Alexander legend was written in the Aljamaido language, building on the Arabic Qisas Dhul-Qarnayn legends as well as Romance language versions of the Alexander romance.

=== New Persian traditions ===
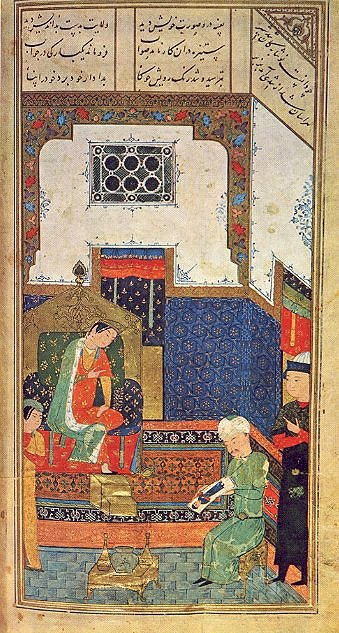
15th century Persian miniature painting from Herat depicting Iskander, the Persian name for Alexander the Great

With the Muslim conquest of Persia in 644 AD, the Alexander romance found its way into Persian literature—an ironic outcome considering pre-Islamic Persia's hostility towards the national enemy who conquered the Achaemenid Empire and was directly responsible for Persian domination by Hellenistic foreign rulers. However, he is not depicted as a warrior and conqueror, but as a seeker of truth who eventually finds the Ab-i Hayat (Water of Life). Islamic Persian accounts of the Alexander legend, known as the Iskandarnamah, combined the Pseudo-Callisthenes material about Alexander, some of which is found in the Quran, with indigenous Sassanid Middle Persian ideas about Alexander. For example, Pseudo-Callisthenes is the source of many incidents in the Shahnama written by Ferdowsi (935–1020 AD) in New Persian. Persian sources on the Alexander legend devised a mythical genealogy for him whereby his mother was a concubine of Darius II, making him the half-brother of the last Achaemenid shah, Darius. By the 12th century such important Persian writers as Nizami Ganjavi (from Ganja in modern-day Republic of Azerbaijan) were making him the subject of their epic poems. The Muslim traditions also elaborated the legend that Alexander the Great had been the companion of Aristotle and the direct student of Plato.

There is also evidence that the Syriac translation of the Alexander romance, dating to the 6th century, was not directly based on the Greek recensions but was based on a lost Pahlavi (pre-Islamic Persian) manuscript.

=== Central Asian traditions ===
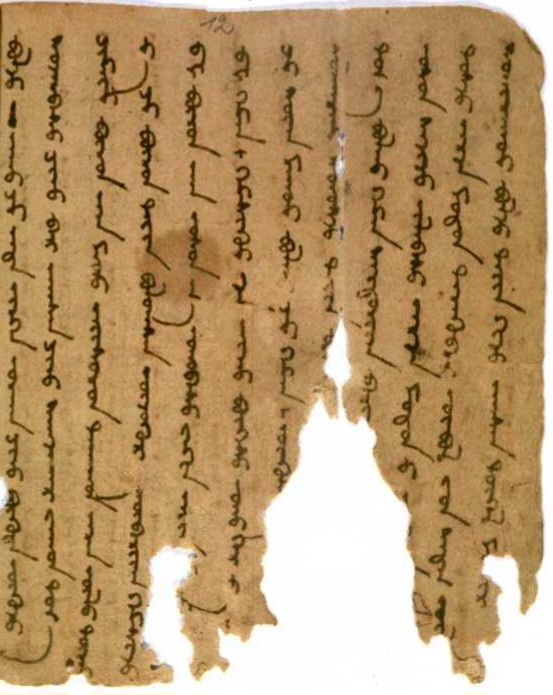
A fragment of a 14th-century Middle Mongolian manuscript of the Alexander Romance, produced in the Chagatai Khanate. In this version, Alexander is called Sulqarnai, a Mongolianized form of the Qur’anic term Dhu al-Qarnayn.

Certain Muslim people of Central Asia, specifically Bulgar, Tatar and Bashkir peoples of the Volga-Ural region (within what is today Tatarstan in the Russian Federation), carried on a rich tradition of the Alexander legend well into the 19th century. The region was conquered by the Abbasid Caliphate in the early 10th century. In these legends, Alexander is referred to as Iskandar Dhul-Qarnayn (Alexander the Two Horned), and is "depicted as founder of local cities and an ancestor of local figures." The local folklore about Iskandar Dhul-Qarnayn played in an important role in communal identity:

The conversion of the Volga Bulghars to Islam is commonly dated to the first decades of the 10th century, and by the middle of the 12th century, it is apparent that Islamic historical figures and Islamic forms of communal validation had become important factors for Bulghar communal and political cohesion. The Andalusian traveler Abū Hamid al-Gharnāti who visited Bulghar in the 1150s, noted that Iskandar Dhūl-Qarnayn passed through Bulghar, that is, the Volga-Kama region, on his way to build the iron walls that contained Yā'jūj and Mā'jūj [Gog and Magog] within the land of darkness ... while Najib al-Hamadāni reports that the rulers of Bulghar claimed descent from Iskandar Dhūl-Qarnayn.

The Iskandar Dhul-Qanryan legends played an important role in the conversion narrative of the Volga Bulgar Muslims:

There are numerous digressions dealing with the founding of the Bulghar conversion narrative, and legends concerning Iskandar Dhūl-Qarnayn [Alexander Dhul-Qarnayn] and Socrates. According to the account, Socrates was born a Christian in Samarqand and went to Greece to serve Iskandar Dhūl-Qarnayn (Iskandar Rūmi). Together, they went to the Land of Darkness (diyār-i zulmat) to seek the Fountain of Youth (āb-i hayāt). In the northern lands they built a city and called it Bulghar.

In 1577 AD the Tsardom of Russia annexed control of the region and Bulgar Muslim writings concerning Dhul-Qarnayn do not appear again until the 18th and 19th centuries, which saw a resurgence of local Iskandar Dhul-Qarnayn legends as a source of Muslim and ethnic identity:

It was only at the turn of the 18th and 19th centuries that we begin to see historical legends concerning Iskandar Dhūl-Qarnayn reemerge among Volga-Kama Muslims, at least in written form, and it was not until the 19th century that such legends were recorded from local Muslim oral tradition. In one of his earliest historical works, entitled Ghilālat al-Zamān and written in 1877 the Tatar theologian, Shihāb al-Dīn Marjānī wrote that according to Arabic and other Muslim writings, as well as according to popular legends, the city of Bulghar was founded by Alexander the Great.

=== Southeast Asian traditions ===
The Malay world has had numerous stories of Alexander the Great, in which he is known as "Iskandar Zulkarnain". His task was to conquer the world and propagate the faith of Abraham, who is considered a prophet in Islam. Various Malay sultans claimed to be descendants of Alexander the Great and were named after him.

== Academic views ==
According to most historians, the story of Dhu al-Qarnayn has its origins in legends of Alexander the Great current in the Middle East, namely the Syriac Alexander Legend. From this derives the Quranic presentation of Dhu al-Qarnayn as a prophet-king who travels the world and calls for belief. The first century Josephus repeats a legend whereby Alexander builds an iron wall at a mountain pass (potentially at the Caucasus Mountains) to prevent an incursion by a barbarian group known as the Scythians, whom elsewhere he identified as Magog. The legend went through much further elaboration in subsequent centuries before eventually finding its way into the Quran through a Syrian version. However, some have questioned whether the Syriac Legend influenced the Quran on the basis of dating inconsistencies and missing key motifs, although others have in turn rebutted these arguments. Some Muslim commentators have used theological arguments to reject the Alexander identification: Alexander lived only a short time whereas Dhu al-Qarnayn (according to some traditions) lived for 700 years as a sign of God's blessing, though this is not mentioned in the Quran, and Dhu al-Qarnayn worshipped only one God, while Alexander was a polytheist.

In the 19th century, Orientalists studying the Quran began researching the identity of Dhul-Qarnayn. Theodor Nöldeke, believed that Dhul-Qarnayn was none other than Alexander the Great as mentioned in versions of the Alexander romance and related literature in Syriac (a dialect of Middle Aramaic). The Syriac manuscripts were translated into English in 1889 by E. A. Wallis Budge.

In the early 20th century Andrew Runni Anderson wrote a series of articles on the question in the Transactions of the American Philological Association. The findings of the philologists imply that the source of the Quran's story of Dhul-Qarnayn is the Alexander romance, a thoroughly embellished compilation of Alexander's exploits from Hellenistic and early Christian sources, which underwent numerous expansions and revisions for two-thousand years, throughout Antiquity and the Middle Ages.

As can be seen in the following quotation from Edwards, secular philologists studying ancient Syriac Christian legends about Alexander the Great also came to the conclusion that Dhul-Qarnayn is an ancient epithet for Alexander the Great. Edwards says,

Alexander's association with two horns and with the building of the gate against Gog and Magog occurs much earlier than the Quran and persists in the beliefs of all three of these religions [Judaism, Christianity and Islam]. The denial of Alexander's identity as Dhul-Qarnain is the denial of a common heritage shared by the cultures which shape the modern world—both in the east and the west. The popularity of the legend of Alexander the Great proves that these cultures share a history which suggests that perhaps they are not so different after all.

Although modern academics have found that the oldest Alexander romance does not contain the episode where Alexander build the gates against Gog and Magog,

The Syriac tradition is one of the most interesting versions of the many existing oriental redactions of the Romance. It dates from the 7th century and goes back on a quite similar Vorlage of the Greek recensio vetusta (n).4 The Syrian redactor, probably an East Syrian Christian, added a certain number of until then unknown episodes to the text. The episode of Alexander's building a wall against Gog and Magog, however, is not found in the oldest Greek, Latin, Armenian and Syriac versions of the Romance.

== See also ==
- Biblical narratives and the Quran
- List of legends in the Quran
- Origin and development of the Quran
- Sana'a manuscripts

== Bibliography ==
- Anderson, Andrew Runni (1927). "Alexander's horns". Transactions and Proceedings of the American Philological Association. 58: 110. doi:10.2307/282906. JSTOR 282906.
- Anderson, Andrew Runni (1928). "Alexander at the Caspian Gates". Transactions and Proceedings of the American Philological Association. 59: 130–163. doi:10.2307/282983. JSTOR 282983.
- Bietenholz, Peter G. (1994). Historia and fabula: myths and legends in historical thought from antiquity to the modern age. Brill. ISBN 978-9004100633. Archived from the original on 23 May 2024.
- Brock, S.A. (1970). "The Laments of the Philosophers over Alexander in Syriac". Journal of Semitic Studies. 15 (2): 205–218. doi:10.1093/jss/15.2.205.
- Boyle, John Andrew (1974). "The Alexander Legend in Central Asia". Folklore. 85 (4): 217–228. doi:10.1080/0015587x.1974.9716561. JSTOR 1259620.
- Budge, E. A. W., ed. (1889). "A Discourse Composed by Mar Jacob upon Alexander, the Believing King, and upon the Gate which he made against Gog and Magog," in The History of Alexander the Great Being, the Syriac Version of the Pseudo-Callisthenes (in Syriac). Translated by Budge, E. A. W.
- Budge, E. A. W., ed. (1896). "The Life and Exploits of Alexander the Great Being," a Series of Translations of the Ethiopic Histories of Alexander by the Pseudo Callisthenes and Other Writers (in Geez). Translated by Budge, E. A. W.
- Bretschneider, E. (1876). The Medieval Geography and History of Central and Western Asia. London. p. 208.
- Broydé, Isaac (1906). "Alexander the Great". Jewish Encyclopedia. Funk and Wagnalls.
- Cawthorne, Nigel (2004). Alexander the Great. Haus Publishing. p. 70. ISBN 978-1-904341-56-7.
- Czeglédy, K. (1954). "Monographs On Syriac And Muhammadan Sources In The Literary Remains Of M. Kmoskó". Acta Orientalia Academiae Scientiarum Hungaricae. 4: 35–36.
- Czeglédy, K. (1957). "The Syriac Legend Concerning Ale/xander The Great". Acta Orientalia Academiae Scientiarum Hungaricae. 7: 246–247.
- Darvishi, Dariush (2022). The Alexander Romance. Tehran: Negah-e Moaser. ISBN 978-622-290-118-9.
- Doufikar-Aerts, Faustina (2003). "The Last Days of Alexander in an Arabic Popular Romance of Al-Iskandar". In Panayotakis, Stelios; Zimmerman, Maaike; Keulen, Wytse (eds.). The Ancient Novel and Beyond. Leiden, The Netherlands: Brill Academic Publishers NV. ISBN 978-90-04-12999-3.
- Edwards, Rebecca (2002). "Two Horns, Three Religions. How Alexander the Great ended up in the Quran" (PDF). American Philological Association, 133rd Annual Meeting Program (Philadelphia, 5 January 2002) 36, Under Reception of Classical Literature, No. 5.
- Emerick, Yahiya (2005). What Islam is All About. Noorart Inc. ISBN 978-1-933269-02-3. Archived from the original on 28 November 2018.
- Ernst, Carl (2003). Following Muhammad: Rethinking Islam in the Contemporary World. University of North Carolina Press. p. 63. ISBN 978-0-8078-5577-5.
- Esposito, John L. (ed.). "Alexander the Great". The Oxford Dictionary of Islam. Oxford Islamic Studies Online. Archived from the original on 9 January 2015.
- Flammarion, Camille (March 1877). "How the Earth was Regarded in Old Times". Popular Science Monthly. 10.
- Friedländer, Israel (1910). "Zur Geschichte Der Chadhirlegende" [The History of the Al-Khidir Legend]. Archiv für Religionswissenschaft (in German). 13: 92–110.
- Friedländer, Israel (1910). "Alexanders Zug Nach Dem Lebensquell Und Die Chadhirlegende" [Alexander's Journey to the Water of Life and the Legend of Al-Khidir]. Archiv für Religionswissenschaft (in German). 13: 161–246.
- Friedländer, Israel (1913). Die Chadhirlegende Und Der Alexanderroman [The Legend of Al-Khidir and the Alexander Romance] (in German). Leipzig: Druck Und Verlag Von B. G. Teubner.
- Green, Peter (2007). Alexander the Great and the Hellenistic Age: A Short History. Modern Library. p. 382. ISBN 978-0-679-64279-4.
- Hammond, N.G.L. (1998). The Genius of Alexander the Great. University of North Carolina Press. pp. 121–122. ISBN 978-0-8078-4744-2.
- Ibn Ishaq; Guillaume, Alfred (2002) [?–767 AD]. The Life of Muhammad: A Translation of Ibn Ishaq's Sirat Rasul Allah. Oxford University Press. pp. 138–140. ISBN 978-0-19-636033-1.
- Ibn Taymiyyah. Salim Adballah Ibn Morgan (ed.). The Criterion Between the Allies of the Merciful and the Allies of the Devil (PDF). Archived from the original (PDF) on 21 October 2020.
- Southgate, Minoo S., ed. (January 1978). Iskandarnamah - A Persian Medieval Alexander-Romance. Translated by Southgate, Minoo S. Columbia University Press. ISBN 978-0-231-04416-5.
- McGinn, Bernard (1998). Visions of the end: apocalyptic traditions in the Middle Ages. Columbia University Press. pp. 56–59. ISBN 978-0-231-11257-4.
- Watt, W. Montgomery (1978). "al-Iskandar". In van Donzel, E.; Lewis, B.; Pellat, Ch. & Bosworth, C. E. (eds.). The Encyclopaedia of Islam, Second Edition. Volume IV: Iran–Kha. Leiden: E. J. Brill. p. 127. ISBN 978-90-04-05745-6. OCLC 758278456.
- Nöldeke, Theodor (1890). "Beiträge Zur Geschichte Des Alexanderroman". Denkschriften der Kaiserlichen Akademie der Wissenschaften, Philosophisch-historische Klasse (in German). 37: 31.
- Nöldeke, Theodor (1892). Sutherland, John Black (ed.). Sketches from Eastern History. Edinburgh: A & C Black. p. 30.
- Nöldeke, Theodor (1893). "The Koran". Encyclopædia Britannica. Vol. 16. Edinburgh: A & C Black. p. 600.
- Nöldeke, Theodor (2005) [1893]. "The Koran". In Turner, Colin (ed.). The Koran: Critical Concepts In Islamic Studies. Vol. 1. London & New York: RoutledgeCurzon. pp. 77–78. ISBN 978-0-415-31191-5.
- Reynolds, Gabriel Said (2007). The Qur'an in its Historical Context. Routledge. ISBN 978-0-415-42899-6.
- Seely, Paul H. (1997). "The geographical meaning of "Earth" and "Seas" in Genesis 1:10" (PDF). Westminster Theological Journal. 59: 231–256. Archived from the original (PDF) on 16 October 2020.
- Stoneman, Richard (2003). "Alexander the Great in Arabic Tradition". In Panayotakis, Stelios; Zimmerman, Maaike; Keulen, Wytse (eds.). The Ancient Novel and Beyond. Brill Academic Publishers NV. ISBN 978-90-04-12999-3.
- van Bladel, Kevin (2008). "The Alexander Legend in the Qur'an 18:83-102". In Reynolds, Gabriel Said (ed.). The Quran in its Historical Context. Routledge.
- Wensinck, Arent Jan (1918). "The Ocean in the Literature of the Western Semites". Verhandelingen der Koninklijke Akademie van Wetenschappen te Amsterdam. Afdeeling Letterkunde. Nieuwe Reeks. dl. 19. no. 2.
- van Donzel, Emeri; Schmidt, Andrea (2010). Gog and Magog in Early Eastern Christian and Islamic Sources: Sallam's Quest for Alexander's Wall. Leiden: Brill. ISBN 9789004174160.}
- Wheeler, Brannon M. (1998). "Moses or Alexander? Early Islamic Exegesis of Qurʾān 18:60-65". Journal of Near Eastern Studies. 57 (3): 191–215. doi:10.1086/468638. S2CID 162366963. Archived from the original on 14 December 2021.
- Wheeler, Brannon M. (2002). Moses in the Qur'an. London: RoutledgeCurzon. pp. 10–36.
- Wood, Michael (1997). In the footsteps of Alexander the Great: a journey from Greece to Asia. University of California Press. p. 119. ISBN 978-0-520-23192-4.
- Zuwiyya, Z. David (2001). Islamic Legends Concerning Alexander the Great: Taken from Two Medieval Arabic Manuscripts in Madrid. Global Academic Publishing (Binghamton University). ISBN 1-58684-132-7. Archived from the original on 13 June 2010.
- Zuwiyya, Z. David (2009), "Alexander the Great", in Campo, Juan (ed.), Encyclopedia of Islam, New York: Facts on File, pp. 30–31, ISBN 978-0-8160-5454-1, archived from the original on 5 November 2012
- Soomro, Taha (2020). "Did the Qurʾān borrow from the Syriac Legend of Alexander?".
