= Aab-e hayat =

Aab-e hayat or Ab-e Hayat (Persian: آب حیات, lit. 'water of life') may refer to:

- Fountain of Youth in Persian literature
- Ab-e Hayat, Iran, a village in Kerman Province, Iran
- Aab-e hayat (Azad), an 1880 work on Urdu poetry written by Muhammad Husain Azad
- Aab-e-Hayat (Nanotvi), a book by Muhammad Qasim Nanautavi
- Abe-Hayat (film), a 1955 Bollywood film
- Aab-E-Hayat, an Urdu novel written by Umera Ahmad

== See also ==
- Water of Life (disambiguation)
- Fountain of Youth (disambiguation)
