= Living Water (disambiguation) =

Living Water is a concept in Judaism and Christianity.

Living Water or Living Waters may also refer to:

- Living Water, or Water of Life, a concept in Christianity
- Living Water International (LWI), non-profit organization that helps communities in developing countries acquire safe water
- Living Waters Lutheran College, Western Australia
- Living Waters Ministries, a Christian ministry connected to The Way of the Master
- Church of Living Water, Istanbul (Dirisu Kilisesi), Evangelical Christian church in Istanbul

== See also ==
- Water of Life (disambiguation)
