= Fountain of Youth (disambiguation) =

The Fountain of Youth is a legendary spring said to restore youth.

Fountain of Youth may also refer to:

== Film and television ==
- Fountain of Youth (film), a 2025 adventure film directed by Guy Ritchie
- "Fountain of Youth" (The Mighty Boosh episode), 2005
- The Fountain of Youth (film), a 1958 television pilot directed by Orson Welles
- Don's Fountain of Youth, a 1953 Donald Duck short

== Locations ==
- Fountain of Youth Archaeological Park, a tourist attraction in St. Augustine, Florida, United States
- Fountain of Youth, a freshwater well near South Bimini Airport

== Music ==
- Fountain of Youth (album), a 2014 album by The Rippingtons
- Fountain of Youth (Wolfe), orchestral composition by Julia Wolfe
- "Fountain of Youth", a 1994 song by Arrested Development from Zingalamaduni
- "Fountain of Youth" a 2016 song by Cane Hill from Smile

== Other ==
- The Fountain of Youth (Cranach), a painting by Lucas Cranach the Elder
- "The Fountain of Youth" (fairy tale), a Japanese fairy tale
- Fountain of Youth Stakes, a Thoroughbred race held in Florida

== See also ==
- Aab-e hayat (disambiguation)
- Fountain of Life (disambiguation)
- Spring of Youth (disambiguation)
- Water of Life (disambiguation)
