= Well of Life =

Well of Life may refer to:

- Fountain of Youth
- Fountain of Life
- Well of Life (sculpture), a work by Ivan Meštrović
- A saying of Solomon in the Book of Proverbs (wikisource)
