= Fountain of Life =

Fountain of Life may refer to:

- Fountain of Life (iconography), a Christian symbol
- The Fountain of Life, also known as the Fountain of Youth, a legend about life-giving waters
- The Fountain of Life (film), a 2012 fan film based on the Masters of the Universe franchise
- The Fountain of Life (painting), a 1432 painting attributed to Jan van Eyck and others
- The Fountain of Life (sculpture), a 1905 sculpture by Ivan Meštrović

== See also ==
- Fountain of Youth (disambiguation)
- Water of Life (disambiguation)
