= Water of Life =

Water of Life may refer to:

- Water of Life (Christianity), a Christian concept
- Water of Life (Dune), a fictional drug in Frank Herbert's Dune novels
- Water of Life, or Fountain of Youth, a legendary life-giving spring
- Water of Life, or living water, a concept in Judaism and Christianity
- "The Water of Life" (German fairy tale), collected by the Brothers Grimm in 1823
- "The Water of Life" (Spanish fairy tale), collected by D. Francisco de S. Maspous y Labros in 1885
- "The Bold Knight, the Apples of Youth, and the Water of Life", Russian fairy tale collected in 1862

== Alcoholic spirits ==
- Aqua vitae, Latin for "water of life", a concentrated solution of ethanol
- Uisce beatha, an early Irish whiskey, the root of the word "whiskey"
- Akvavit, a Scandinavian distilled drink
- Eau de vie, a French distilled drink

== See also ==
- Fountain of Life (disambiguation)
- Fountain of Youth (disambiguation)
- Aab-e hayat (disambiguation)
- Living water
