= Expositiuncula in Ioannem Evangelistam =

Ninth-century gospel commentary

Expositiuncula in Ioannem Evangelistam ("Little Commentary on John the Evanglist") is a work by the ninth-century Benedictine monk Christian of Stavelot. As its name implies, it is a commentary on the Gospel of John. It is, however, not nearly as comprehensive as his earlier Expositio in Matthaeum Evangelistam.
