= Spring of Youth =

Spring of Youth may refer to:

- Spring of Youth (Taiwan), an old water source in Changhua County, Taiwan
- Spring of Youth (TV series), a 2025 South Korean television series
- Operation Spring of Youth, the 1973 Israeli raid on Lebanon
- "Spring of Youth", a march by Hermann Ludwig Blankenburg

== See also ==
- Fountain of Youth (disambiguation)
