= Church of Living Water, Istanbul =

Evangelical Christian church in Turkey

Church of Living Water
- Dirisu Kilisesi

Religion
- Affiliation: Evangelical Christian

Location
- Location: Istanbul, Turkey

The Church of Living Water (Dirisu Kilisesi) is an Evangelical Christian church in Istanbul, Turkey. The building lies in the Istanbul district of Osmanbey, in the neighborhood of Pangalti, along Ergenekon Caddesi.
