= Ab-e Hayat, Iran =

Ab-e Hayat اب حيات
- Village
- Location within Iran
- Coordinates: 27°55′04″N 58°09′09″E
- Country: Iran
- Province: Kerman
- County: Rudbar-e Jonubi
- Bakhsh: Central
- Rural District: Nehzatabad

Population (2006)
  - Total: 584
- Time zone: UTC+3:30 (IRST)
  - Summer (DST): UTC+4:30 (IRDT)

Ab-e Hayat (Persian: اب حيات, also Romanized as Āb-e Ḩayāt) is a village in Nehzatabad Rural District, in the Central District of Rudbar-e Jonubi County, Kerman province, Iran. At the 2006 census, its population was 584, in 121 families.
