= Christian of Stavelot =

Ninth-century Christian monk

Christian of Stavelot was a ninth-century Christian monk. He is sometimes (possibly incorrectly) referred to as Christian Druthmar or Druthmar of Aquitaine. Christian was a noted grammarian, Biblical commentator, and eschatologist. He was born in Aquitaine, southwestern France, in the early ninth century AD, and became a monk at the Benedictine monastery of Corbie. At some point in the early or mid-ninth century he was sent to the abbey of Stavelot-Malmedy in Liège, to teach Bible to the monks there. It is unknown whether he died at Stavelot, returned to Corbie or was ultimately sent elsewhere.

== Career ==
Christian was called the "Philologist" because of his extensive knowledge of Greek grammar and his ability to comment upon the Gospels in their original Greek. It is likely he also had some understanding of Hebrew.

Among Christian's works is the commentary Expositio in Matthaeum Evangelistam ("Commentary on the Gospel of Matthew"), in which he discussed (among other things) the eschatological implications of portions of that Gospel. The traditional date given for the composition of this work is 864; however, some scholars have questioned this and maintained that Christian actually lived decades earlier.

Multiple manuscripts have survived of Christian's commentary on Matthew the Evangelist's gospel, some of which were likely edited by later writers to conform with their own views. Of particular interest to, and considerable debate among, modern scholars is Christian's view of the doctrine of transubstantiation. As Philip Schaff noted:

Curiously enough, his exact language upon this interesting point cannot be now determined beyond peradventure, because every copy of the first printed edition prepared by Wimphelin de Schelestadt, Strassbourg 1514, has perished, and in the MS. in possession of the Cordelier Fathers at Lyon the critical passage reads differently from that in the second edition, by the Lutheran, Johannes Secerius, Hagenau 1530. In the Secerius text, now printed in the Lyon edition of the Fathers, and in Migne, the words are, 26:26, “Hoc est corpus meum. Id est, in sacramento” (“This is my body. That is, in the sacrament,” or the sacramental sign as distinct from the res sacramenti, or the substance represented). Matt. 26:28, Transferens spiritualiter corpus in panem, vinum in sanguinem (“Transferring spiritually body into bread, wine into blood”). In the MS. the first passage reads: “Id est, vere in sacramento subsistens” (“That is, truly subsisting in the sacrament”); and in the second the word “spiritualiter“ is omitted. The Roman Catholics now generally admit the correctness of the printed text, and that the MS. has been tampered with, but insist that Druthmar is not opposed to the Catholic doctrine on the Eucharist.

Christian's writings have also attracted the interest of scholars of Jewish history. A tantalizing reference exists in Christian's work to the conversion of the Khazars to Judaism, believed to have occurred in the late eighth or early ninth centuries:

At the present time we know of no nation under the heavens where Christians do not live. For [Christians are even found] in the lands of Gog and Magog -- who are a Hunnic race and are called Gazari (Khazars) [they are] circumcised and observing all [the laws of] Judaism. The Bulgars, however, who are of the same seven tribes [as the Khazars], are now becoming baptized [into Christianity].

Other works attributed to Christian include Expositio Brevis in Lucam ("A Brief Commentary on Luke"; and Expositiuncula in Ioannem Evangelistam ("A Little Commentary on the Gospel of John.")

== Works ==
- Expositio in Matthaeum Evangelistam
- Expositio en Brevis in Lucam ("A Brief Commentary on Luke"); less comprehensive than the previous
- Expositiuncula in Ioannem Evangelistam

== Editions ==
- Huygens, R. B. C., ed. Christianus dictus Stabulensis, Expositio super librum generationis (Turnhout: Brepols, 2008) (Corpus Christianorum Continuatio Mediaevalis, 224).
