= The Fountain of Youth (Cranach) =

Painting by Lucas Cranach the Elder

- Der Jungbrunnen (German)
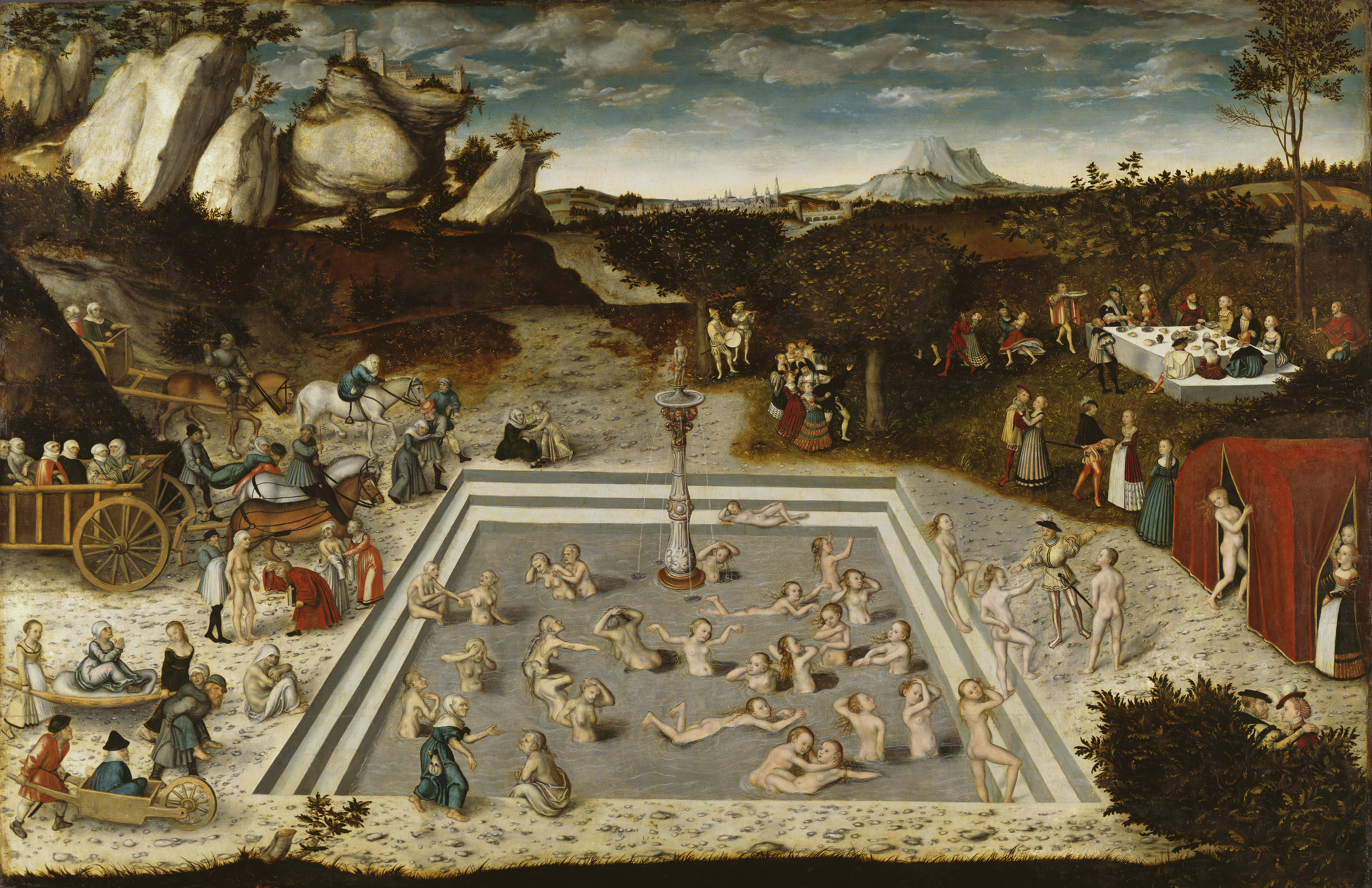
- Artist: Lucas Cranach the Elder
- Year: 1546
- Medium: oil on lime panel
- Dimensions: 186.1 cm × 120.6 cm (73.3 in × 47.5 in)
- Location: Gemäldegalerie, Berlin

The Fountain of Youth is an oil-on-panel painting executed in 1546 by the German artist Lucas Cranach the Elder. It depicts a version of the Fountain of Youth.

== Description ==
The image is an oil painting on a lime wood board, executed in landscape format with the dimensions 186.1 x 120.6 centimeters. It shows on the bottom center, a winged serpent in flight from Cranach's workshop and the year 1546. It shows a fountain where older women bathe, are rejuvenated and finally indulge in music, dance and good food. Cranach presents a fairy tale image of the Fountain of Youth; in many details it reflects the real bathing culture of the Middle Ages as well as the belief that certain baths might heal and rejuvenate the body. The picture belonged to the inventory of the former Prussian royal palaces, and now hangs in the Gemäldegalerie museum in Berlin.

== Analysis ==
The background depicts a fantastic rocky landscape with unreal perspectives and proportions. A miniature castle on a rock can be seen on the far left, leaning over a cliff. In the center background a medieval city view is painted with a stone arch bridge over a river, which leads to the town. On the right a mighty mountain range is surrounded with lush fields and fruit trees. The barren rock on the left half symbolizes the arduous age of women, whilst the dense green forest on the right acts as a metaphor for youth. The basin, which covers the center foreground, is shown from a high point of view and is depicted as a square, surrounded by steps leading into the basin. The column-shaped fountain in the middle of the pool is crowned with the figures of Venus and Cupid, suggesting that the bath serves the force of love.

The foreground shows us the effect of the fountain, with elderly women, frail and worn, some even unable to walk, being led to the pool. They undress, get into the healing water, and appear rejuvenated on the right side of the pool, where a gallant young man shows them into a tent. Here the women get dressed before they can move on to indulge in sensual pleasures, as suggested in the right background, where young couples are dancing and dining to music. On the left edge of the pool we can see a man in a red jacket holding a book. He gazes at one of the elderly nude women, which suggests that he is a scholar or doctor, examining the effect of the fountain. On the edge of the basin, two women wrapped in towels are shown. These women, of which one sits at the front left corner and the other at the center bottom of the basin, seem to be reluctant to get into the water, doubting whether a rejuvenated life is even desirable. The fact that only women attend this bath, is due to the belief that older men would automatically rejuvenate in dealing with young women. In reality such alleged healing springs were also visited by men. In Cranach's picture all men are young, represented gallant and advantageous towards the elder women, however ugly and unattractive. Spread over the entire image, Cranach's figures refer to the individual stages of supernatural transformation: it is the search for paradise. The picture shows a man's dream. Bathing was associated with health, which easily led to the belief in broader effects of water, as shown by baptismal rites of religions. The fountain was a popular motif in medieval narratives, especially in medieval French literature, and offered versatile opportunities for depictions of nudes and genre scenes.

The presentation of old naked women is very uncommon for the art of this period: idealized nudes of young men and women were a more widespread genre. The beauty ideal for women in Cranach's age consisted of a bulging belly, round shapes without pubic hair, high-set breasts with small nipples and fair hair. Most of the figures in Cranach's work follow the ideals of beauty of the time and leads experts to believe that this painting is by his hand. However, the attribution of the picture is not certain. Research suggests both Lucas Cranach the Elder and his son as the author. Lately it is associated with the late work of the father, but other employees of the Cranach workshop were probably involved in the execution. It is believed that the painting was commissioned, by an unknown client.

== Provenance ==
By 1830, The Fountain of Youth was part of the management of the royal palaces. Then it came to the Royal Museum and now hangs in the Gemäldegalerie in Berlin.

== Sources ==
- Gustav Friedrich Hartlaub: Der Jungbrunnen, 1549. (= Der Kunstbrief. 4). Mann, Berlin um 1943, OCLC 260090865 (online).
- Ausschnitt aus dem „Jungbrunnen des Lukas Cranach“ In: Du: kulturelle Monatsschrift. Band 6, 1946, Heft 9, doi:10.5169/seals-289826. (Zwei vergrößerte Ausschnitte auf den Folgeseiten)
- Elena Likhovodova: Die Suche nach dem irdischen Paradies im „Jungbrunnen“ von L. Cranach d. Ä. (= Dissertation Freie Universität Berlin). Berlin 2000/2001, OCLC 638132208.
