= Expositio in Matthaeum Evangelistam =

9th century religious text

Exposito in Matthaeum Evangelistam ("Commentary on the Gospel of Matthew") is a work by the ninth-century Benedictine monk Christian of Stavelot. As its name implies, it is a commentary on the Gospel of Matthew. In the preface, Christian promised to produce commentaries on the other gospels, but wrote only two brief works on the Gospel of John and the Gospel of Luke, neither of which is as comprehensive or complete.

The traditional date given for the composition of this work is 864; however, some scholars have questioned this and maintained that Christian actually lived decades earlier. Multiple editions have survived of Christian's commentary on Matthew, some of which were likely edited by later writers to conform with their own views. Of particular interest to, and considerable debate among, modern scholars is Christian's view of the doctrine of transubstantiation. As Philip Schaff noted:

his exact language upon this interesting point cannot be now determined beyond peradventure, because every copy of the first printed edition prepared by Wimphelin de Schelestadt, Strassburg 1514, has perished, and in the MS. in possession of the Cordelier Fathers at Lyon the critical passage reads differently from that in the second edition, by the Lutheran, Johannes Secerius, Hagenau 1530. In the Secerius text, now printed in the Lyon edition of the Fathers, and in Migne, the words are, 26:26, “Hoc est corpus meum. Id est, in sacramento” (“This is my body. That is, in the sacrament,” or the sacramental sign as distinct from the res sacramenti, or the substance represented). Matt. 26:28, Transferens spiritaliter corpus in panem, vinum in sanguinem (“Transferring spiritually body into bread, wine into blood”). In the MS. the first passage reads: “Id est, vere in sacramento subsistens” (“That is, truly subsisting in the sacrament”); and in the second the word “spiritaliter“ is omitted. The Roman Catholics now generally admit the correctness of the printed text, and that the MS. has been tampered with, but insist that Druthmar is not opposed to the Catholic doctrine on the Eucharist.

Christian's writings have also attracted the interest of scholars of Jewish history. A tantalizing reference exists in Christian's work to the conversion of the Khazars to Judaism, believed to have occurred in the late eighth or early ninth centuries:

At the present time we know of no nation under the heavens where Christians do not live. For [Christians are even found] in the lands of Gog and Magog -- who are a Hunnic race and are called Gazari (Khazars) [they are] circumcised and observing all [the laws of] Judaism. The Bulgars, however, who are of the same seven tribes [as the Khazars], are now becoming baptized [into Christianity].

== See also ==
- Exposito en Brevis in Lucam
- Expositiuncula in Ioannem Evangelistam

== Notes ==
1. Dunlop ___.
2. Schaff § 172.
3. Quotes at Khazaria.com
