= Fountain of Youth =

Mythical spring granting longevity

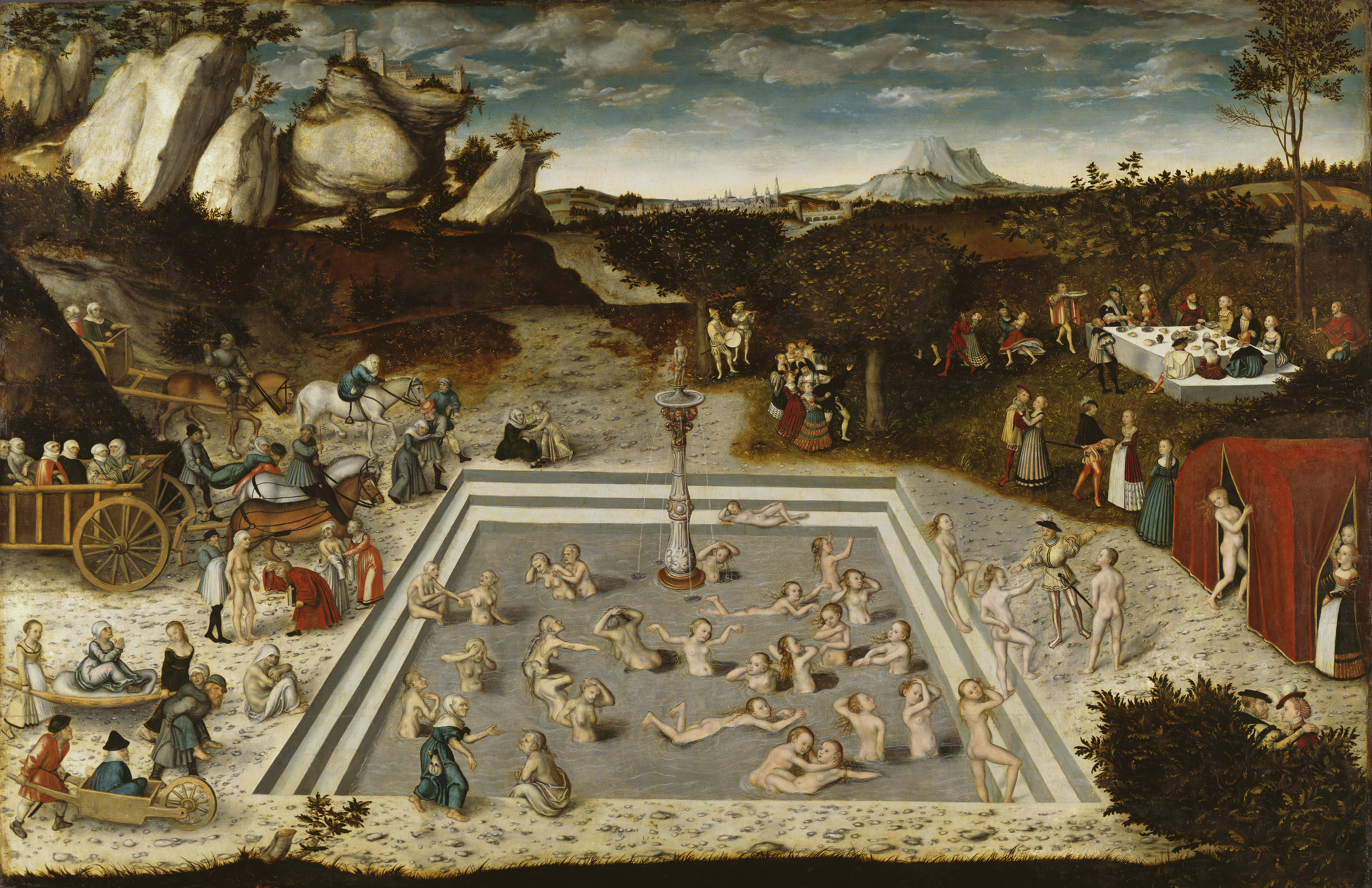
The Fountain of Youth, 1546 painting by Lucas Cranach the Elder

The Fountain of Youth is a mythical spring that supposedly restores the youth of anyone who drinks or bathes in its waters. Tales of such a fountain have been recounted around the world for thousands of years, appearing in the writings of Herodotus (5th century BCE), in the Alexander Romance (3rd century CE), and in the stories of Prester John (early Crusades, 11th/12th centuries CE).

Stories of similar waters also featured prominently among the people of the Caribbean during the Age of Exploration (early 16th century); they spoke of the restorative powers of the water in the mythical land of Bimini. Based on these many legends, explorers and adventurers looked for the elusive Fountain of Youth or some other remedy to aging, generally associated with magic waters. These waters might have been a river, a spring or any other water-source said to reverse the aging process and to cure sickness when swallowed or bathed in.

The legend became particularly prominent in the 16th century, when it became associated with the Spanish explorer Juan Ponce de León, the first Governor of Puerto Rico. Ponce de León was supposedly searching for the Fountain of Youth when he traveled to Florida in 1513. Legend has it that Native Americans told Ponce de León that the Fountain of Youth was in Bimini.

== Early accounts ==
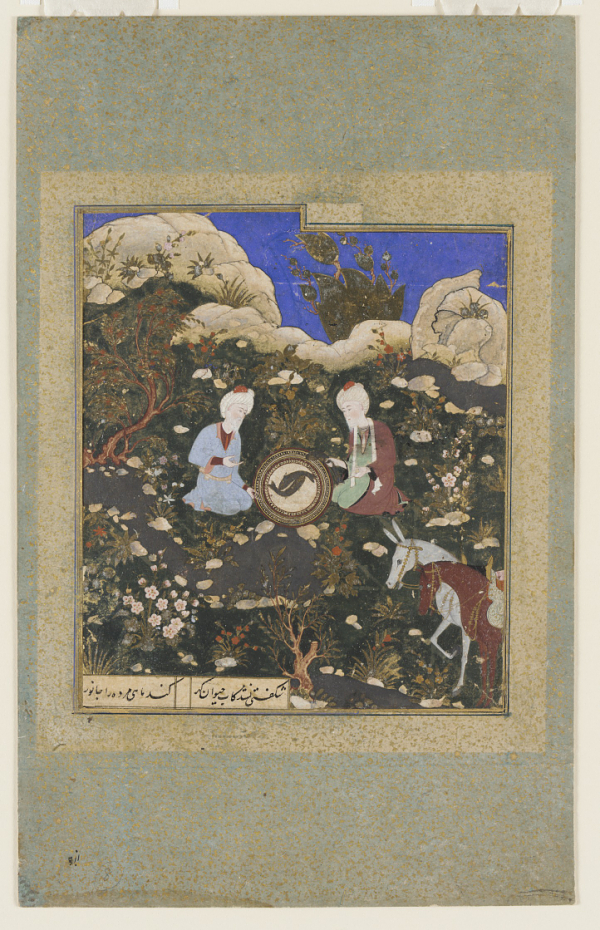
Persian miniature depicting Khidr and Alexander watching the Water of Life revive a salted fish

Objects that can sustain or restore youth are common in ancient literature. One especially influential account is the story of Gilgamesh's quest for immortality in Epic of Gilgamesh. The story is told in tablets IX-XI of Sîn-lēqi-unninni's Babylonian Epic, compiled between 1300 and 1000 BCE. It tells of Gilgamesh traveling to ina pí nãrãti, the Mouth of the Rivers, to find Utnapishtim, hero of the flood myth who became immortal. He crosses the darkness of Mount Mashu and the Waters of Death to Utnapishtim's island, but Utnapishtim tells him that only the gods can grant immortality. He tells Gilgamesh to try to avoid sleep for six days, which Gilgamesh fails to do. Utnapishtim can only tell him the secret of a plant called The-Old-Man-Will-Be-Made-Young that grows beneath the sea. Gilgamesh successfully finds the plant, but it is stolen by a snake when he stops to bathe, and Gilgamesh must accept his failure and return home a mortal man.

Herodotus mentions a fountain containing a special kind of water in the land of the Macrobians, which gives them their exceptional longevity.

The Ichthyophagid then in their turn questioned the king concerning the term of life, and diet of his people, and were told that most of them lived to be a hundred and twenty years old, while some even went beyond that age—they ate boiled flesh, and had for their drink nothing but milk. When the Ichthyophagi showed wonder at the number of the years, he led them to a fountain, wherein when they had washed, they found their flesh all glossy and sleek, as if they had bathed in oil- and a scent came from the spring like that of violets. The water was so weak, they said, that nothing would float in it, neither wood, nor any lighter substance, but all went to the bottom. If the account of this fountain be true, it would be their constant use of the water from it which makes them so long-lived.

== Alexander the Great ==
Around the 4th century AD, legends of a quest for mystical life-giving waters became attached to the Greek conqueror Alexander the Great. It first appeared in Recension Beta (β) of the Greek Alexander Romance, a fantastical narrative about Alexander written between 300 and 550. The Alexander stories were influenced by the earlier legends of Gilgamesh's search for immortality.

In the Alexander Romance, Alexander is leading his army through the Land of Darkness in search of the Land of the Blessed. Growing hungry, he asks his cook to prepare something to eat. The cook washes a salted fish in a spring, where it returns to life. The cook drinks the water but keeps it from Alexander, who does not hear of it until it is too late to find the spring again. The story of Alexander's quest for the water of life was very popular, and versions appeared in other manuscripts of the Alexander Romance as well as the Babylonian Talmud and the Syriac Song of Alexander.

The version in the Babylonian Talmud appears in Tractate Tamid 32b, composed in the late 5th or 6th century. In this version, Alexander himself finds the waters when he washes a salted fish that comes alive, and he proceeds to wash his face in the water. The text also recounts an alternative version where Alexander traces the source of the water to the entrance of the Garden of Eden, which replaces the Land of the Blessed from the Alexander Romance.

The Syriac Song of Alexander, written between 628-636, contains a more elaborate version of the episode than the Alexander Romance. Here, Alexander asks a wise man for help finding the water of life in the Land of Darkness, and he recommends having his cook wash salted fish in all the nearby springs until he finds the one that revives it. When this happens, the cook jumps into the spring to chase it. He tells Alexander what happened, but Alexander cannot find the spring again due to the eternal darkness. The wise man consoles Alexander, saying it was not God's wish for the king to have eternal life.

The Alexander Romance was adapted into hundreds of versions in more than a dozen languages. The Old French verse version Roman d'Alexandre, written in the 1170s by Lambert li Tors and Alexander of Paris, had particular influence on the Fountain of Youth legend. Here, the water of life episode is expanded to adventures at three different magic springs Alexander finds in India, one that bestows immortality, one that brings the dead back to life and one that restores youth. Each is connected to different major rivers that all somehow share a source in the Garden of Eden, with the Fountain of Youth connected to the Tigris and Euphrates. It flows from the head of a golden lion sculpture in a pavilion of crystal and marble in an evergreen grove; its waters rejuvenate 56 of Alexander's elderly companions to the age of 30. These details greatly influenced later traditions surrounding the Fountain of Youth.

== Later accounts ==
An account related to the story of Alexander and the water of life occurs in chapter 18 of the Qu'ran (Al-Kahf), though here, Moses (Musa) is the seeker. Moses and his servant search for and find the confluence of two seas. Resting on a rock, they forget their fish, which springs to life and swims off. Later Moses asks for the fish and the servant reveals what happened, and Moses realizes that was the place he sought. They retrace their steps and meet an enigmatic "servant of God" who imparts his wisdom to Moses. The servant of God is not named, but later commenters identify him as the immortal being Khidr and elaborate upon the story.

These earlier accounts inspired the popular medieval fantasy The Travels of Sir John Mandeville, which also mentions the Fountain of Youth as located at the foot of a mountain outside Lombe (modern Kollam). Due to the influence of these tales, the Fountain of Youth legend was popular in courtly Gothic art, appearing for example on the Gothic ivory casket Casket with Scenes of Romances and several ivory mirror-cases, and remained popular through the European Age of Exploration.

== Christian symbolism ==
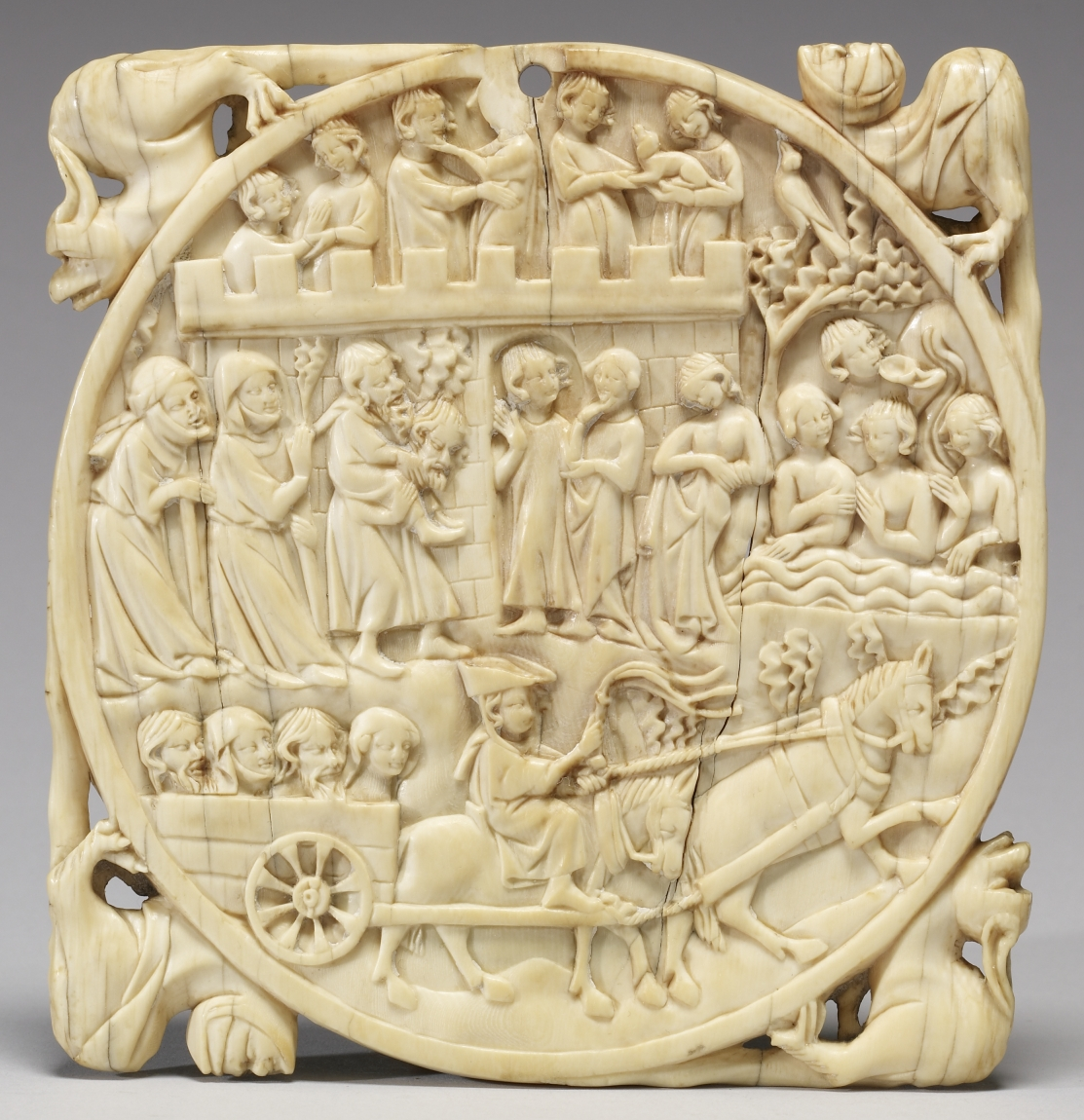
French 14th-century ivory mirror case with a Fountain of Youth

European iconography is fairly consistent, as The Fountain of Youth (Der Jungbrunnen), a painting by Cranach, and an ivory mirror-case from 200 years earlier demonstrate: Der Jungbrunnen depicts old people, often carried, who enter at left, strip, and enter a pool that is as large as space allows. The people in the pool are youthful and naked, and after a while they leave it, and are shown fashionably dressed enjoying a courtly party, sometimes including a meal. On the carved ivory mirror-cover, elderly men and women walk or travel by cart from the left to the mythical Fountain of Youth at the right. They bathe and reemerge as young couples who enter into the castle at the center and the court above.

There are countless indirect sources for the tale as well. Eternal youth is a gift frequently sought in myth and legend, and stories of things such as the philosopher's stone, universal panaceas, and the elixir of life are common throughout Eurasia and elsewhere.

== Bimini ==
According to legend, the Spanish heard of Bimini from the Arawaks in Hispaniola, Cuba, and Puerto Rico. The Caribbean islanders described a mythical land of Beimeni or Beniny (whence Bimini), a land of wealth and prosperity, which became conflated with the fountain legend. By the time of Ponce de Leon, the land was thought to be located northwest towards the Bahamas. Bimini was the island that Ponce's royal contract stipulated that he was to seek and discover. This land was conflated with the Boinca or Boyuca mentioned by Juan de Solís, although Solís's navigational data placed it in the Gulf of Honduras. The archaeologist and historian Sam Turner says that according to Herrera's abridged account of the 1513 voyage, the only one known to have been taken from the original 1513 logs, Ponce's fleet altered course "though Bimini did not lie in that direction".

While it is not known whether any legend about healing waters was widespread among the indigenous peoples of the Caribbean, the Italian-born chronicler Peter Martyr attached such a story drawn from ancient and medieval European sources to his account of the 1514 voyage of Juan Diaz de Solis in a letter to the Pope in 1516, though he did not believe the stories and was dismayed that so many others did.

== Ponce de León ==
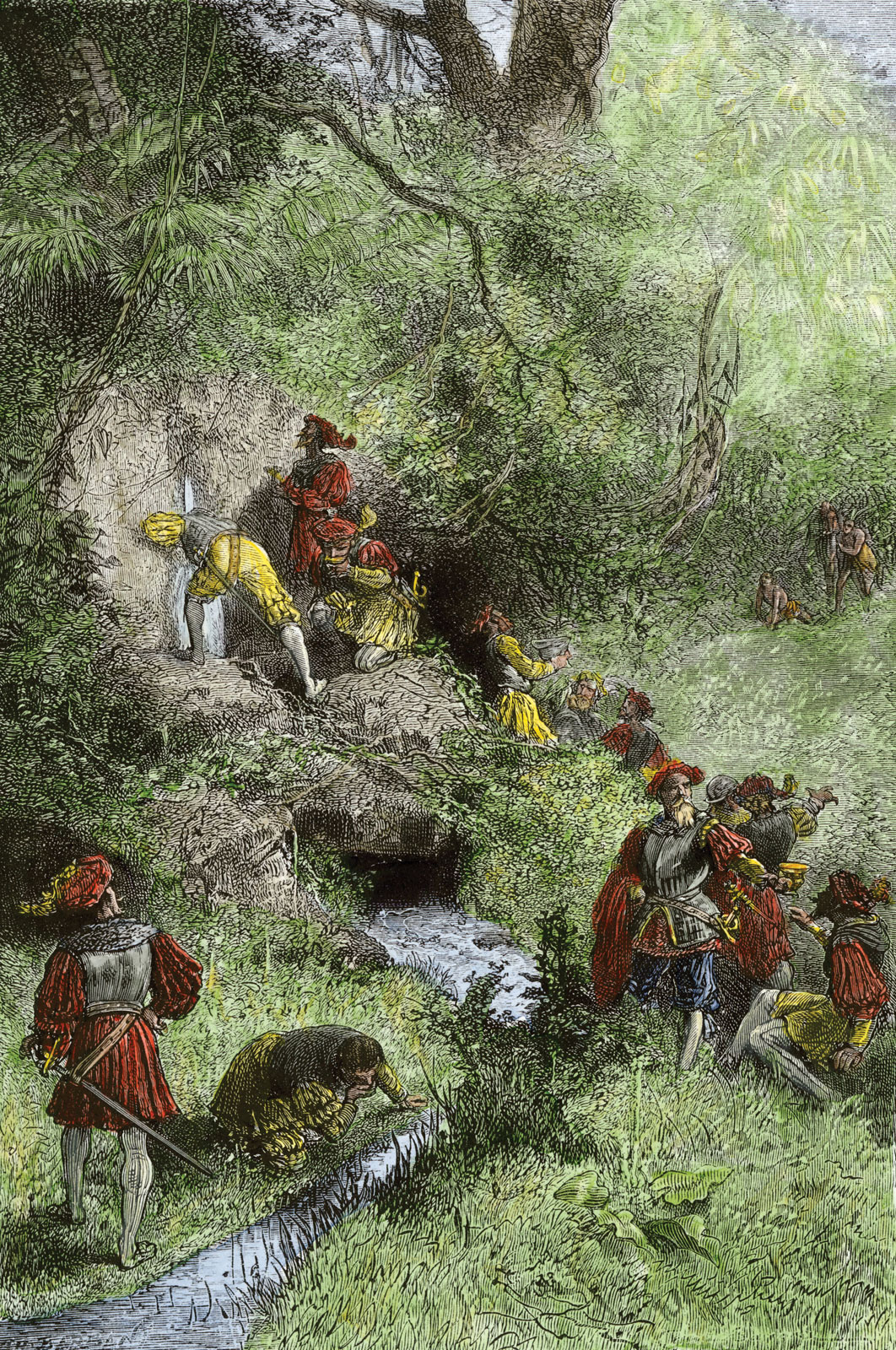
19th-century German artist's impression of Juan Ponce de León and his explorers drinking from a spring in Florida while supposedly seeking the Fountain of Youth

In the 16th century the story of the Fountain of Youth became attached to the biography of the conquistador Juan Ponce de León. As attested by his royal charter, Ponce de León was charged with discovering the land of Beniny. Although the indigenous peoples were probably describing the land of the Maya in Yucatán, the name—and legends about Boinca's fountain of youth—became associated with the Bahamas instead. However, Ponce de León did not mention the fountain in any of his writings throughout the course of his expedition.

The connection was made in Gonzalo Fernández de Oviedo y Valdés's Historia general y natural de las Indias of 1535, in which he wrote that Ponce de León was looking for the waters of Bimini to regain youthfulness. Some researchers have suggested that Oviedo's account may have been politically inspired to generate favor in the courts. A similar account appears in Francisco López de Gómara's Historia general de las Indias of 1551. In the Memoir of Hernando d'Escalante Fontaneda in 1575, the author places the restorative waters in Florida and mentions de León looking for them there; his account influenced Antonio de Herrera y Tordesillas' unreliable history of the Spanish in the New World. Fontaneda had spent seventeen years as an Indian captive after being shipwrecked in Florida as a boy. In his Memoir he tells of the curative waters of a lost river he calls "Jordan" and refers to de León looking for it. However, Fontaneda makes it clear he is skeptical about these stories he includes, and says he doubts de León was actually looking for the fabled stream when he came to Florida.

Herrera makes that connection definite in the romanticized version of Fontaneda's story included in his Historia general de los hechos de los Castellanos en las islas y tierra firme del Mar Oceano. Herrera states that local caciques paid regular visits to the fountain. A frail old man could become so completely restored that he could resume "all manly exercises … take a new wife and beget more children." Herrera adds that the Spaniards had unsuccessfully searched every "river, brook, lagoon or pool" along the Florida coast for the legendary fountain.

== Fountain of Youth Archaeological Park ==
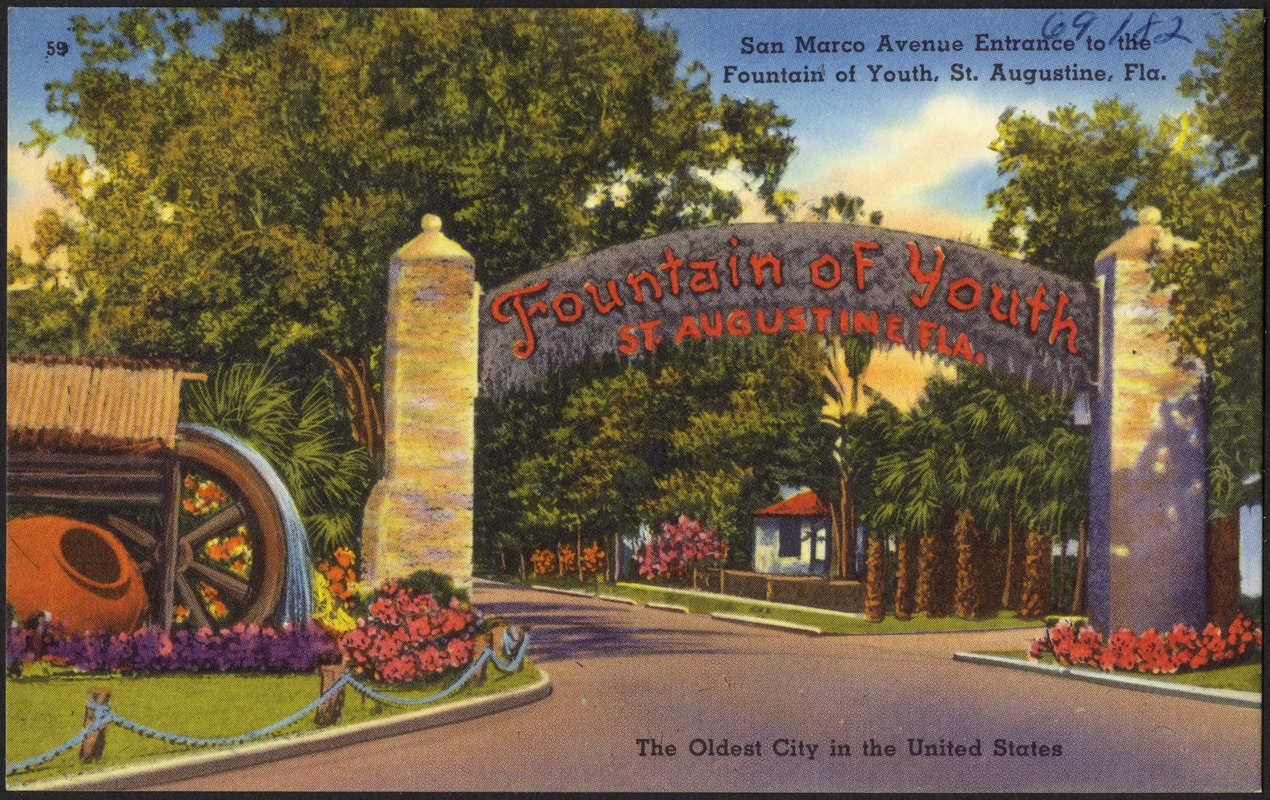
Postcard from the Fountain of Youth in St. Augustine

The city of St. Augustine, Florida, is home to the Fountain of Youth Archaeological Park, a tribute to the spot where Ponce de León was supposed to have landed according to promotional literature, although there is no historical or archaeological evidence to support the claim. There were several instances of the property being used as an attraction as early as the 1860s; the tourist attraction in its present form was created by Luella Day McConnell in 1904. Having abandoned her practice as a physician in Chicago and gone to the Yukon during the Klondike gold rush of the 1890s, she purchased the Park property in 1904 from Henry H. Williams, a British horticulturalist, with cash and diamonds, for which she became known in St. Augustine as "Diamond Lil".

Around the year 1909 she began advertising the attraction, charging admission, and selling post cards and water from a well dug in 1875 for Williams by Philip Gomez and Philip Capo. McConnell later claimed to have "discovered" on the grounds a large cross made of coquina rock, asserting it was placed there by Ponce de León himself. In 1981 the St. Augustine Historical Society obtained the personal testimony of a city resident who witnessed the cross being laid. McConnell continued to fabricate stories to amuse and appall the city's residents and tourists until her death in a car accident in 1927.

Walter B. Fraser, a transplant from Georgia who managed McConnell's attraction, then bought the property and made it one of the state's most successful tourist attractions. The first archaeological digs at the Fountain of Youth were performed in 1934 by the Smithsonian Institution. These digs revealed a large number of Christianized Timucua burials. These burials eventually pointed to the Park as the location of the first Christian mission in the United States. Called the Mission Nombre de Dios, this mission was begun by Franciscan friars in 1587. Succeeding decades have seen the unearthing of items which positively identify the Park as the location of Pedro Menéndez de Avilés's 1565 settlement of St. Augustine, the oldest continuously inhabited European settlement in North America. The park currently exhibits native and colonial artifacts to celebrate Ponce de León and Pedro Menéndez de Avilés, the founder of St. Augustine. Exhibits of Timucua and Spanish heritage are also on display.

== See also ==
- Immortality
- Elixir of life
- Schiller Woods magic water pump
