= Haskell (surname) =

Haskell or Haskel is a surname with several origins. The English surname derives from the Norman personal name Aschetil (Old Norse Ásketill or Áskell), with ás meaning god and ketill meaning helmet. The Ashkenazic surname derives from the personal name Khaskl; the Yiddish form is Yechezkel. Related surnames include Askelson, Askin, Axtell, Hascall, Haskett, Haskin, Hasty, and MacAskill.

People with the name include:

- Alexander Cheves Haskell (1839–1910), Confederate Army colonel, and Democratic politician
- Amir Haskel (born 1953), Israel Defense Forces brigadier general, Air Force pilot in reserve and Holocaust researcher
- Anne Haskell (born 1943), American politician from Maine
- Arlo Haskell, American author and publisher
- Arnold Haskell (1903–1980), British dance critic
- Barbara Haskell (born 1946), American art historian, curator at the Whitney Museum of American Art
- Burnette Haskell (1857–1907), American radical
- Charles N. Haskell (1860–1933), American lawyer, oilman, and statesman
- Charles Ready Haskell (died 1836), namesake of Haskell County, Texas
- Colleen Haskell (born 1976), American former reality show contestant and actress
- David Haskell (1948–2000), American actor and singer
- David Haskell (editor), American magazine editor, ceramicist, and distiller
- David G. Haskell, British-born American biologist and author
- Dennis Haskell (born 1948), Australian poet and critic
- Diana Haskell, American clarinetist
- Doc Haskell, American professor and esports coach
- Douglas Haskell (1899–1979), American writer, architecture critic and magazine editor
- Dudley C. Haskell (1842–1883), American politician and merchant
- Edward Haskell (1906–1986), American scientist
- Ella Knowles Haskell (1860–1911), American lawyer
- Ernest Haskell (1876–1925), American artist and illustrator
- Fitch Harrison Haskell (1883–1962), American architect
- Floyd Haskell (1916–1998), US Senator from Colorado
- Frances Haskell (1871–1947), American politician
- Francis Haskell (1928–2000), English art historian
- Frank A. Haskell (1828–1864), Union Army officer during the American Civil War
- Frank W. Haskell (1843–1903), Union soldier in the American Civil War, and Medal of Honor recipient
- Gil Haskell (born 1943), National Football League coach
- Gordon Haskell (1946–2020), English pop music vocalist and songwriter
- Graham Haskell (born 1948), Australian athlete
- H. Harrison Haskell (1939–1990), Republican member of the Pennsylvania House of Representatives (1971–1978)
- Harriet Newell Haskell (1835–1907), American educator, principal of Monticello Seminary (1868–1907)
- Harry G. Haskell Jr. (1921–2020), American businessman and Republican politician
- Henri J. Haskell (1843–1921), first Montana Attorney General (1889–1897)
- Henry L. Haskell (1863–1940), American businessman and inventor
- Ian Haskell (1963) English Drummer
- Ida C. Haskell (1861–1932), American painter and educator
- Jack Haskell (1919–1998), American singer and announcer
- Jack Haskell (producer) (1886–1963), American theatrical producer
- James Haskell (born 1985), English rugby union player
- James Richard Haskell (1843–1897), American firearm designer
- Jamie Haskell (born 1980), American curler
- Jane Haskell (1923–2013), American light artist
- Jimmie Haskell (1936–2016), American composer and arranger
- Job Haskell (1794–1879), American politician
- John G. Haskell (1832–1907), American architect
- John Haskell (author) (born 1958), American author
- Jonathan Haskel (born 1963), British economist
- Jonathan Haskell (1755–1814), United States Army officer, acting Adjutant General and acting Inspector General of the Army in 1796
- Katharine Wright Haskell (1874–1929), American teacher, suffragist, and younger sister of Wilbur and Orville Wright
- Lawrence Haskell (1898–1964), American university administrator and sports coach
- Leonhard Haskel (1872–1923), German stage and film actor and drama teacher
- Lewis Wardlaw Haskell (1868–1938), American diplomat, politician, and professor
- Lillian Gallup Haskell (1862–1940), First Lady of Oklahoma, Oklahoma Hall of Fame inductee
- Llewellyn F. Haskell (born Thomas Frost Haskell; 1842–1929), Union Army officer during the American Civil War
- Loney Haskell (born Lorne Levy; 1870–1933), American vaudeville entertainer and theatre manager
- Marcus M. Haskell (1843–1925), Union soldier in the American Civil War
- Martin Haskell (born 1946), American physician
- Mary M. Haskell (1869–1953), American congregationalist missionary in Bulgaria
- Mary Haskell (educator) (1873–1964), American educator best known as the benefactress of Kahlil Gibran
- Mellen Woodman Haskell (1863–1948), American mathematician
- Miriam Haskell (1899–1981), American jewelry designer
- Molly Haskell (born 1939), American feminist film critic
- Nathaniel M. Haskell (1912–1983), Maine Republican politician
- Neil Haskell (born 1987), American contemporary dancer
- Norman Haskell (1905–1970), American geophysicist
- Oreola Williams Haskell (1875–1953), American suffragist, author, and poet
- Oscar Haskell (1857–1943), New Zealand cricketer
- Pearl T. Haskell (1868–1919, was an American physician, politician, and college football coach
- Peter Haskell (1934–2010), American television actor
- Preston Haskell (born 1938), American civil engineer
- Reuben L. Haskell (1878–1971), US congressman from New York
- Robert Haskell (1903–1987), Maine Republican politician
- Sacha Haskell (born 1969), New Zealand association football, tennis and cricket player
- Sharren Haskel (born 1984), Israeli politician and Deputy Minister of Foreign Affairs
- Simon Haskel, Baron Haskel (born 1934), British politician and life peer
- Stephen N. Haskell (1833–1922), American evangelist, missionary and editor in the Seventh-day Adventist Church
- Susan Haskell (born 1968), Canadian actress
- Thomas Haskell (historian) (1939–2017), American historian
- Thomas Haskell (journalist) (1833–1928), American journalist
- Thomas H. Haskell (1842–1900), American justice of the Maine Supreme Judicial Court
- Timothy Haskell, New Zealand scientist
- Timothy Haskell (director), American theater director
- Todd P. Haskell (born 1962), American diplomat
- Wilf Haskell (born 1936), New Zealand cricketer and sports historian
- Will Haskell (born 1996), American politician
- William E. Haskell (1865–1927), American organ-builder and inventor
- William N. Haskell (1878–1952), United States Army lieutenant general
- William T. Haskell (1818–1859), American politician

== See also ==
- Haskell (disambiguation)
