= Haskell (disambiguation) =

Haskell is a purely functional programming language.

Haskell may also refer to:

== People ==
- Haskell (surname), a list of people with the surname Haskell or Haskel
- Haskell (given name), a list of people with the given name Haskell or Haskel

== Places ==
=== United States ===
- Haskell, Arkansas, a city
- Haskell, Indiana, an unincorporated community
- Haskell, New Jersey, an unincorporated community
- Haskell, Oklahoma, a town
- Haskell, Texas, a city
- Haskell County, Kansas
- Haskell County, Oklahoma
- Haskell County, Texas
- Haskell Township (disambiguation)
- Haskell Pass, Montana

=== Antarctica ===
- Haskell Glacier, Ellsworth Land
- Mount Haskell, Graham Land
- Haskell Ridge, Oates Land
- Haskell Strait, Antarctica

== Businesses in the United States ==
- Haskell (company), a US-based architecture, engineering, and construction firm

== School-related ==
- Haskell Indian Nations University, in Lawrence, Kansas
  - Haskell Indian Nations Fighting Indians, the athletic programs of the university
  - Haskell Memorial Stadium
- Haskell School (Troy, New York), a former school and historic building in Troy, New York
- Haskell School (Boston, Massachusetts), one of the schools that formed The Cambridge School of Weston
- Haskell Oriental Museum, a forerunner of the Oriental Institute of the University of Chicago

== Other uses ==
- Haskell Free Library and Opera House, a neoclassical building located in Rock Island, Quebec and Derby Line, Vermont
- Haskell House (disambiguation)
- Haskell Limestone, a geologic unit in eastern Kansas
- Haskell organ pipe construction, in which a pipe is nested in a larger one to obtain the same pitch with a shorter pipe
- Haskell Stakes, a Grade I race for thoroughbred horses held in New Jersey
- Haskell-class attack transports, amphibious assault ships of the United States Navy created in 1944
  - USS Haskell (APA-117), lead ship of the class
- Eddie Haskell, a fictional character in the American sitcom Leave It to Beaver

== See also ==
- Haskell-Baker Wetlands, Kansas, US
- Chaskel (disambiguation)
