= Marimba =

Wooden keyboard percussion instrument

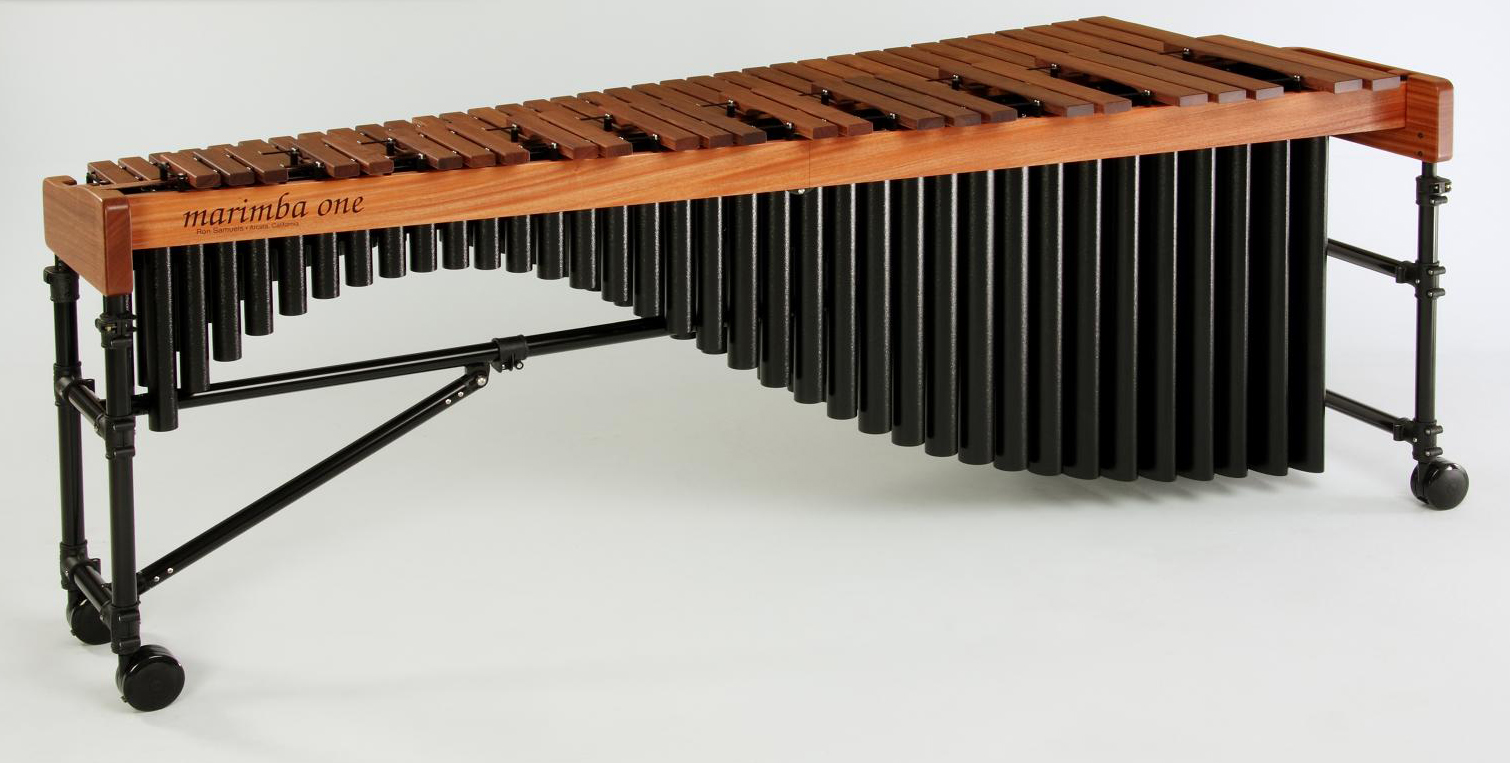
- A 5-octave marimba made by Marimba One

Percussion instrument
- Classification: Keyboard percussion
- Hornbostel–Sachs classification: 111.212 (Set of percussion sticks)
- Developed: Mexico, 16th century

Playing range

Related instruments
- Marimbaphone; xylophone; xylorimba; flapamba; balafon

Musicians
- See list of marimbists

Builders
- See list of marimba manufacturers

Marimba sound
Marimba sound in "Attraction".

The marimba (/məˈrɪmbə/ mə-RIM-bə) is a musical instrument in the percussion family that consists of wooden bars that are struck by mallets. Below each bar is a resonator pipe that amplifies particular harmonics of its sound. Compared to the xylophone, the marimba has a lower range. Typically, the bars of a marimba are arranged chromatically, like the keys of a piano. The marimba is a type of idiophone.

Today, the marimba is used as a solo instrument, or in ensembles like orchestras, marching bands (typically as a part of the front ensemble), percussion ensembles, brass and concert bands, and other traditional ensembles.

== Etymology and terminology ==
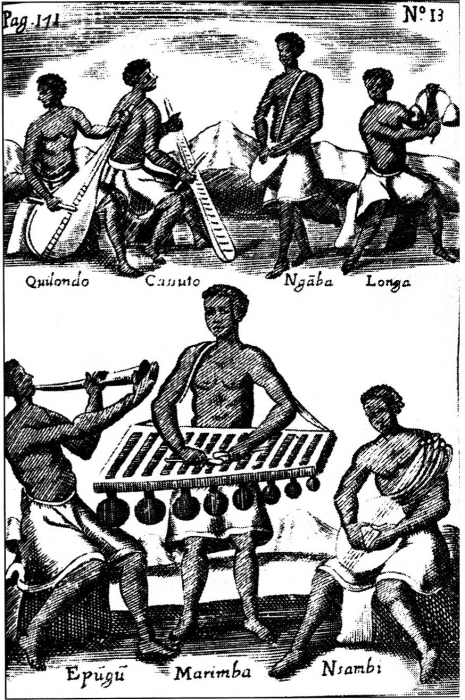
An array of named instruments in the Kongo Kingdom by Girolamo Merolla da Sorrento (1692)

The term marimba refers to both the traditional version of this instrument and its modern form. Its first documented use in the English language dates back to 1704. The term is of Bantu origin, deriving from the prefix ma- meaning 'many' and -rimba meaning 'xylophone'. The term is akin to Kikongo and Swahili marimba or malimba.

== History ==
=== Ancient ===
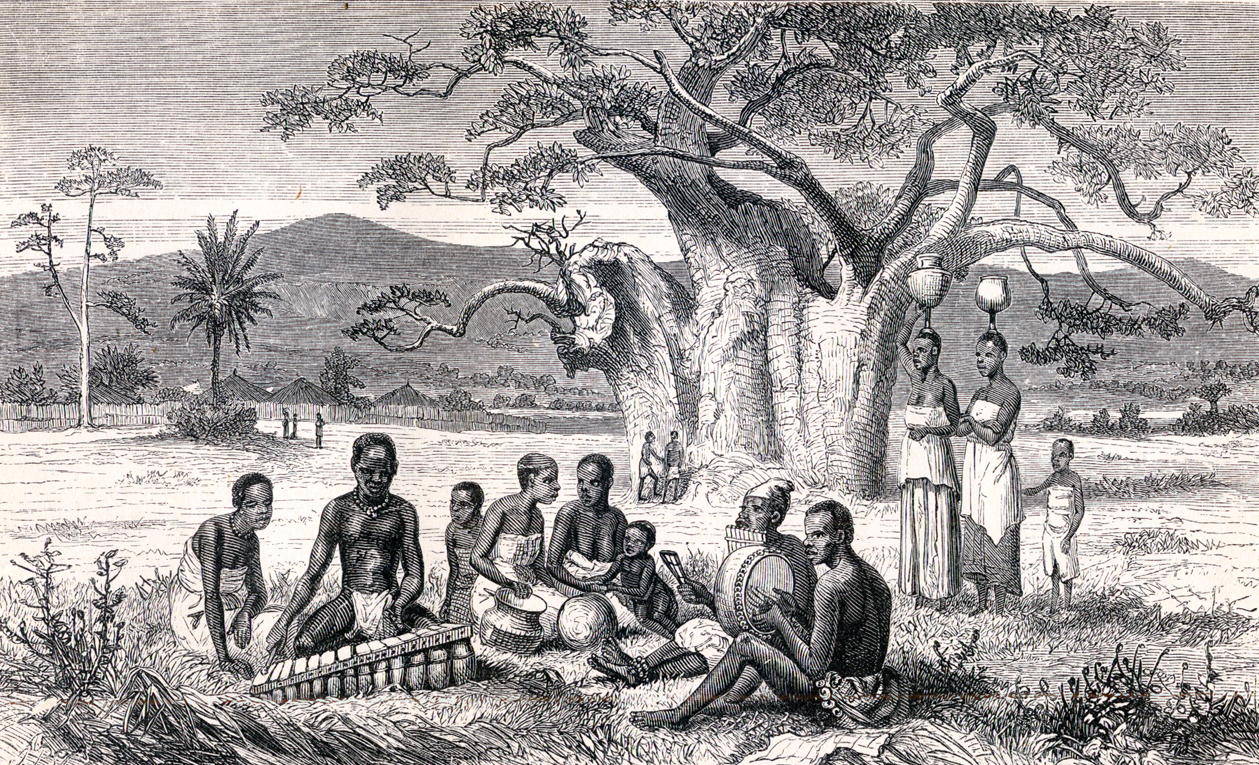
Marimba players in Africa

Instruments like the marimba are present throughout the entirety of sub-Saharan Africa. The instrument itself is most similar and shares its name with the marimbas of modern-day Angola and the Democratic Republic of the Congo. However, it is also similar to instruments that exist in West Africa such as the balafon of the Mandinka people, known as gyil among the Gur peoples in and around northern Ghana and Burkina Faso.

=== Mexico ===
The first known dates back to 1545 in the Santa Lucía hacienda, in the municipality of Jiquipilas, Chiapas. According to documentation dated October 9, 1545, the encomendero Don Pedro Gentil de Bustamante and owner of the hacienda of Santa Lucia, describes in his chronicle a marimba in a celebration of Indians; and tells us the following:.

"...said instrument is composed of eight slats of red wood, unequal in size, which are pierced together with cord and produce joyful echoes with boards of the macaguil (macagüil) stick (...) rows of boards tied to short orchestras (sic) flanged and stretched under said instrument a hole in the ground and glued with resin on the boards snake rattles that make musical vibrate with blows of two small sticks with black wax head one for each hand... ...that this music is accompanied by a drum of animal skin (...)"

It is believed that xylophones came to America by means of Africans who had been taken to Guatemala and Mexico, although there are also records in some Mayan pyramids found in Chiapas and Guatemala. The first documented mention of the marimba in Guatemala (marimba de tecomates), dates from November 13, 1680 during the inauguration celebrations of the Santa Iglesia Catedral in Santiago de los Caballeros de Guatemala.

The modern double keyboard marimba was created in 1892, in Chiapas, Mexico, thanks to the innovation of Corazón de Jesús Borras Moreno, a native of the Municipality of Venustiano Carranza, Chiapas, Mexico. In 1897, the current model of marimba was played for the first time in the traditional park of the church of Señor del Pozo, in the same municipality, from that moment it has gone from being a native instrument to a concert instrument. A five-octave instrument was first built, and later an 11-octave, huge instrument was built, which was played by 9 elements.

=== Central America ===
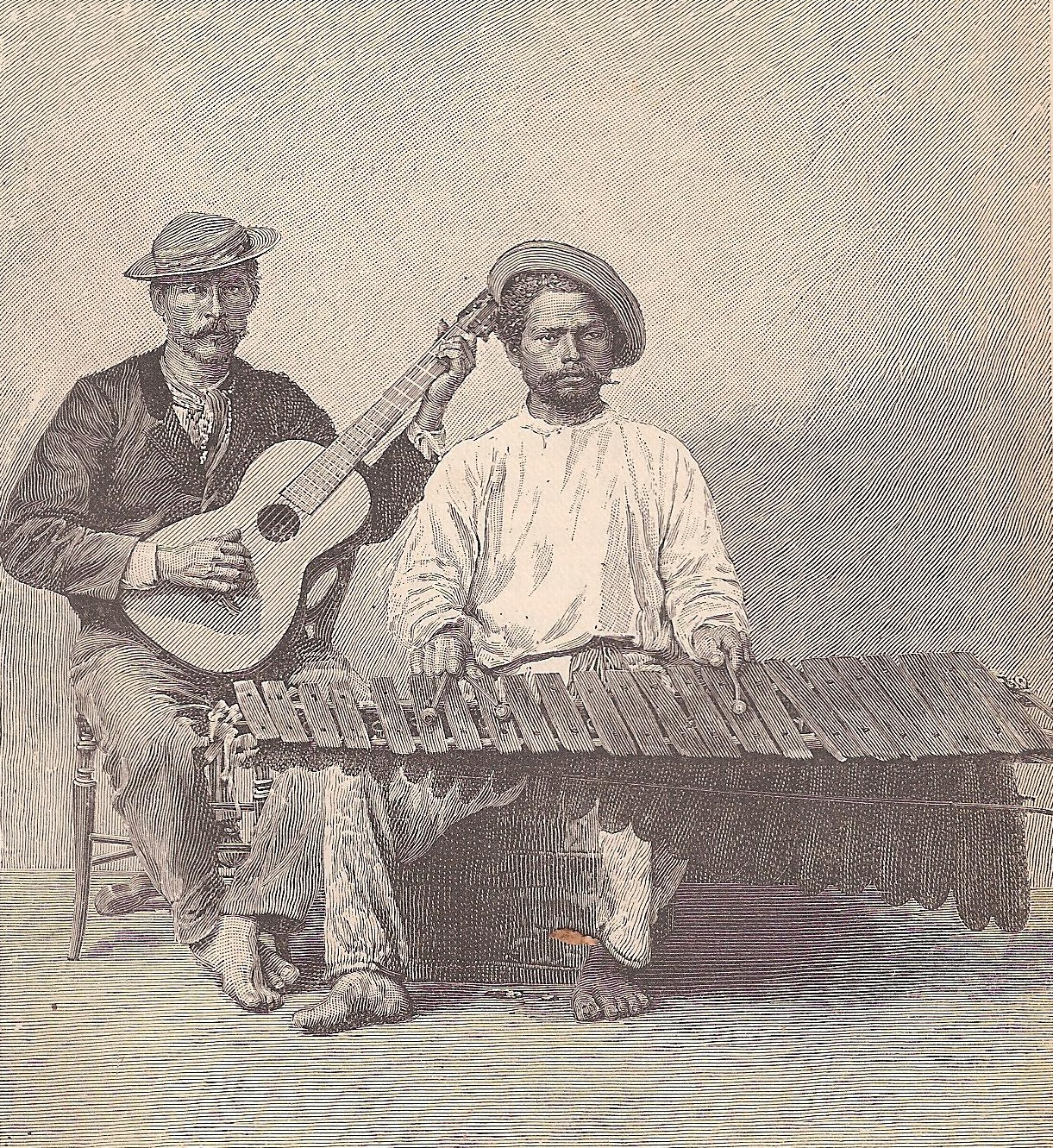
"The Marimba" from "The Capitals of Spanish America" (1888)

In Central America there are two versions of its origin. Some claim that it was brought by black slaves from Africa, while others consider it native, created by the Maya-quiche.

Historian David Vela says: "We also refer to the thesis of Dr. Castañeda Paganini on the possible invention of the marimba in Guatemala, by Africans brought as slaves in the sixteenth century; it is surprising however that the marimba appears here early among communities closed to their influence, among remote mountains, and is missing in the areas actually inhabited by the colored race." what is undoubted is that the ingenuity of the local countries transformed the instrument to the point of making it their own.

Since there are records in Guatemala that in the middle of the 18th century, in the same city of Santiago de Guatemala (today Antigua Guatemala), the presbyter Joseph de Padilla developed a new version of the instrument (simple marimba), to which he extended the extension of the keyboard to 42 keys (first and only collective instrument in the world), he added a structure with 4 legs raising it from the ground, being able to play standing up.

In 1894 in Quetzaltenango, the master Sebastián Hurtado developed the first chromatic marimba or double keyboard marimba made of Hormigo wood (Plathymiscium dimorphandrum) giving it up to 6 musical scales. He inherited the marimba to his sons and they created the group Marimba Royal of the Hurtado brothers who in 1908 performed a concert in the city of Buffalo, New York, and thus introduced the marimba (with the contributions of Guatemala) in the United States, making it known to the world.

Being an instrument used in many countries of the Americas, on February 12, 2015, the Organization of American States (OAS) declares the marimba "Cultural Heritage of the Americas".

The marimba is popular throughout Central America, with its popularity spreading from southern Mexico to Costa Rica. The first historical account in Central America is from 1550 where enslaved Africans in Guatemala are reported playing it. By 1680 accounts of Maya musicians using marimbas with gourd resonator were made in Guatemala. It became more widespread during the 18th and 19th centuries, as Maya and Ladino ensembles started using it on festivals. In 1821, the marimba was proclaimed the national instrument of Guatemala in its independence proclamation.

=== South America ===
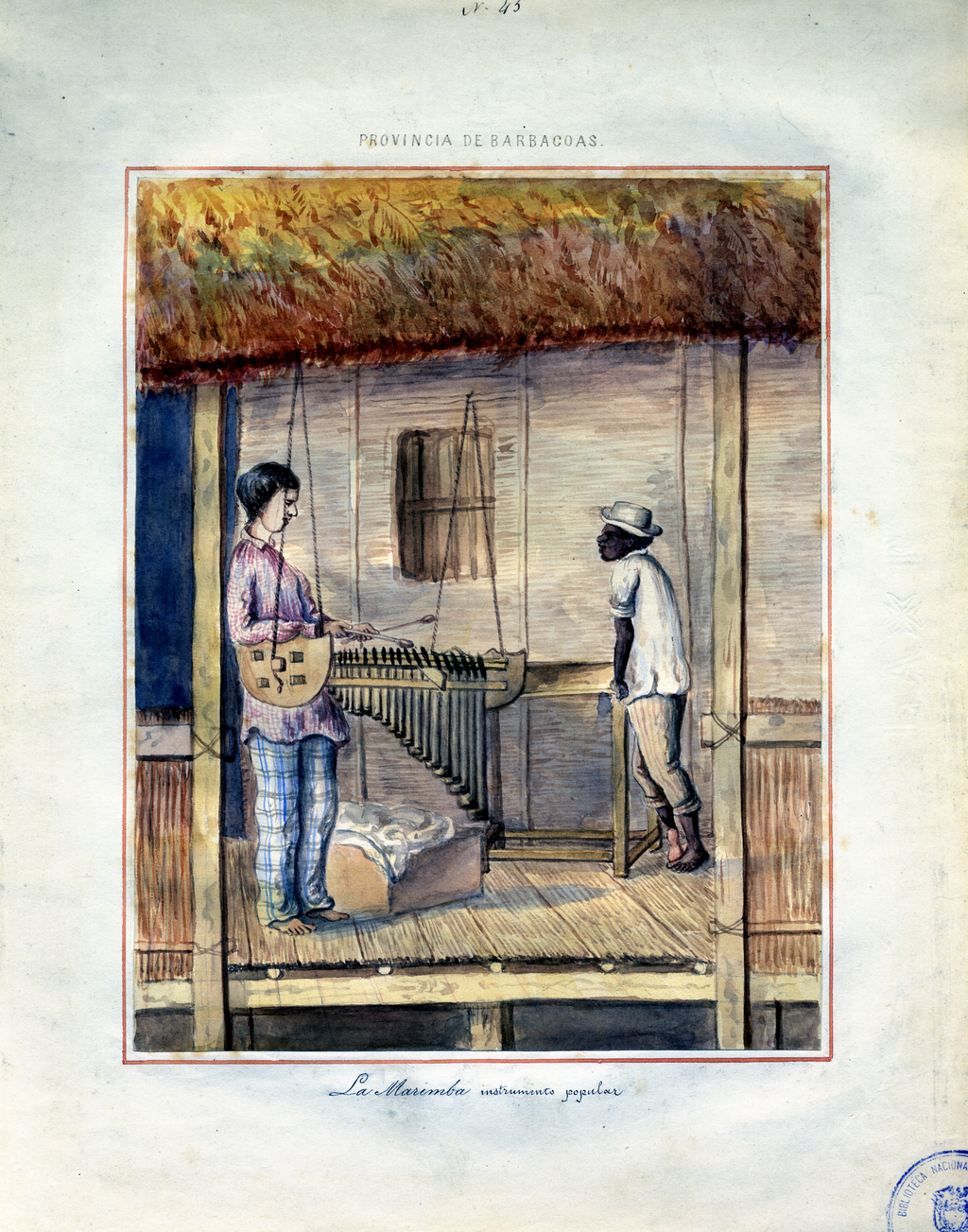
A watercolor of marimbas by Manuel María Paz from the Province of Barbacoas in Colombia (1853)

Marimba's second range of popularity in Latin America is in the Pacific coast of Colombia and Ecuador. The instruments were brought there via the African diaspora and their cultural significance has survived to the present day. The Afro-Latino communities that take part in preserving and playing it value its importance as a touchstone of their resilience.

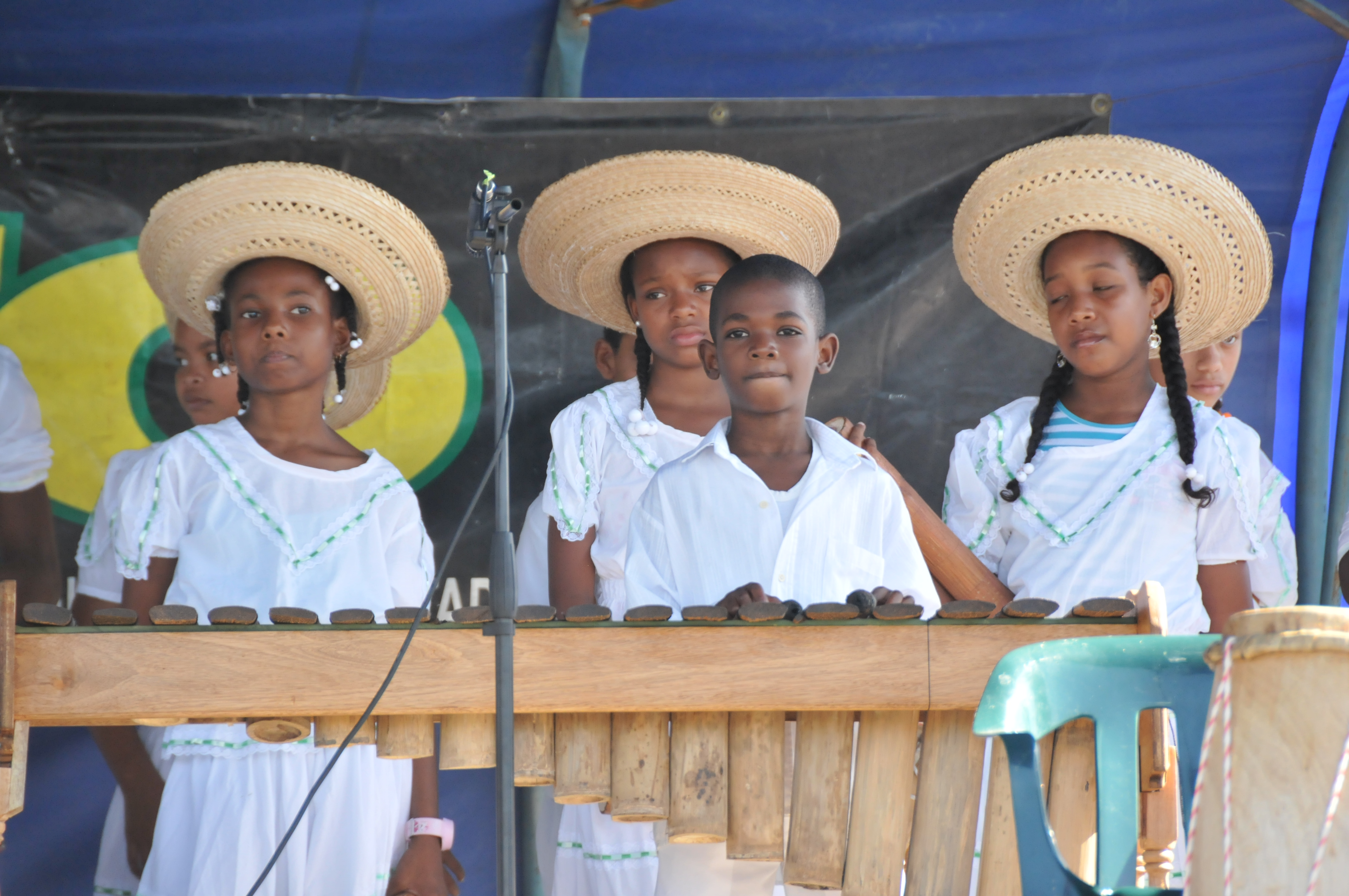
Afro-Colombian youth playing the marimba de chonta

In Colombia the most widespread marimba is the marimba de chonta (peach-palm marimba). Marimba music has been listed on UNESCO as an intangible part of Colombian culture. In recent times marimberos (marimba players) and the marimba genres as a whole have started to fade out in popularity. Nonetheless, the genre is still popular in the departments of Chocó and Cauca.

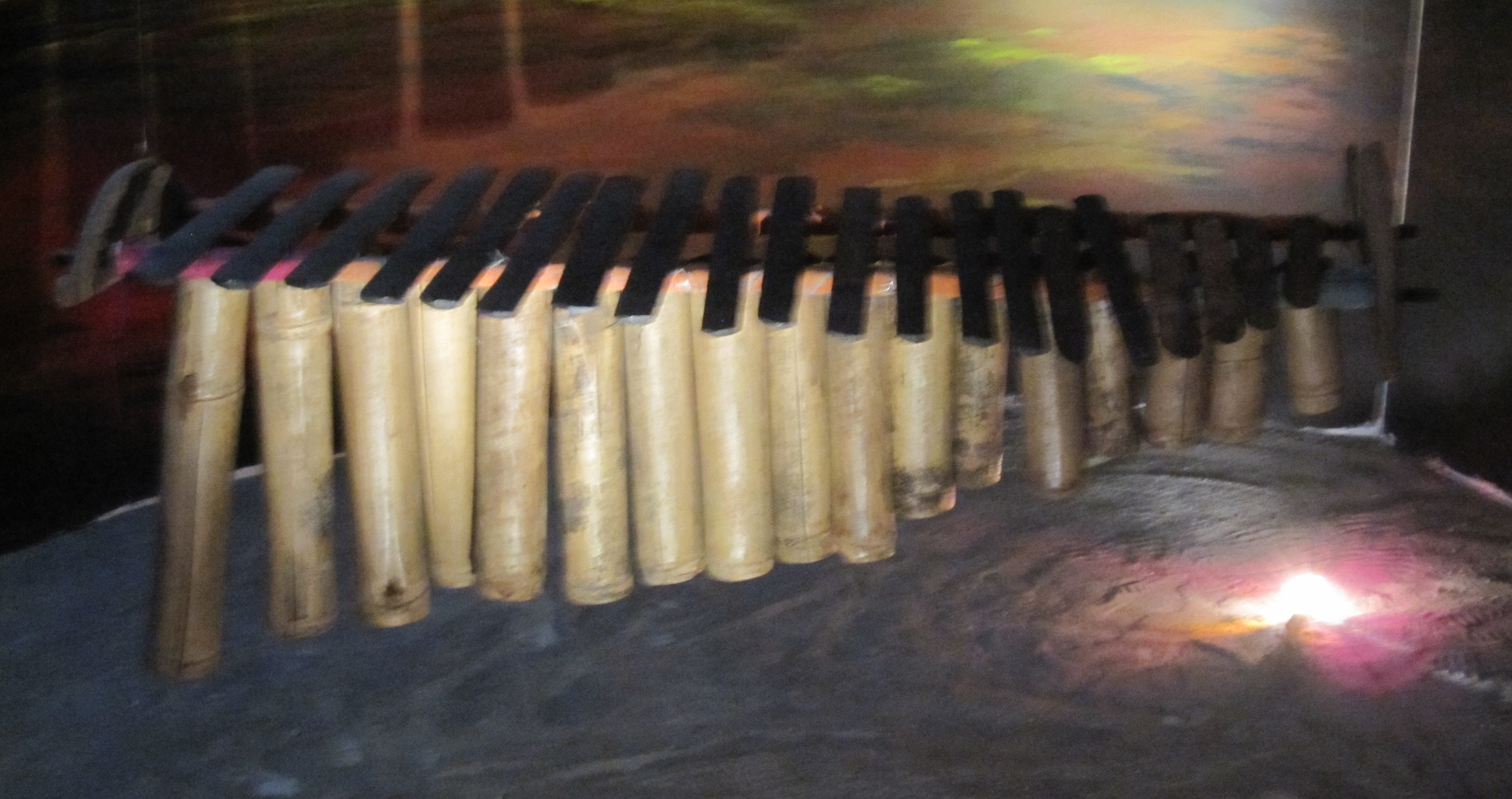
An example of the Afro-Ecuadorian marimba esmeraldeña

In Ecuador the most widespread marimba is the marimba esmeraldeña (Esmeralda marimba). Marimbas are an important aspect of Afro-Ecuadorian culture: many religious ceremonies and songs are accompanied with marimba music along with festivals and dances. It is most popular in the province of Esmeraldas where in the 16th century Alonso de Illescas, a maroon, found a maroon settlement near the area around modern day Esmeraldas. In that province, it evokes a sense of pride for the community in which years centuries marimba music has been prohibited after government encroachment upon the Esmeraldas province.

=== Modern ===
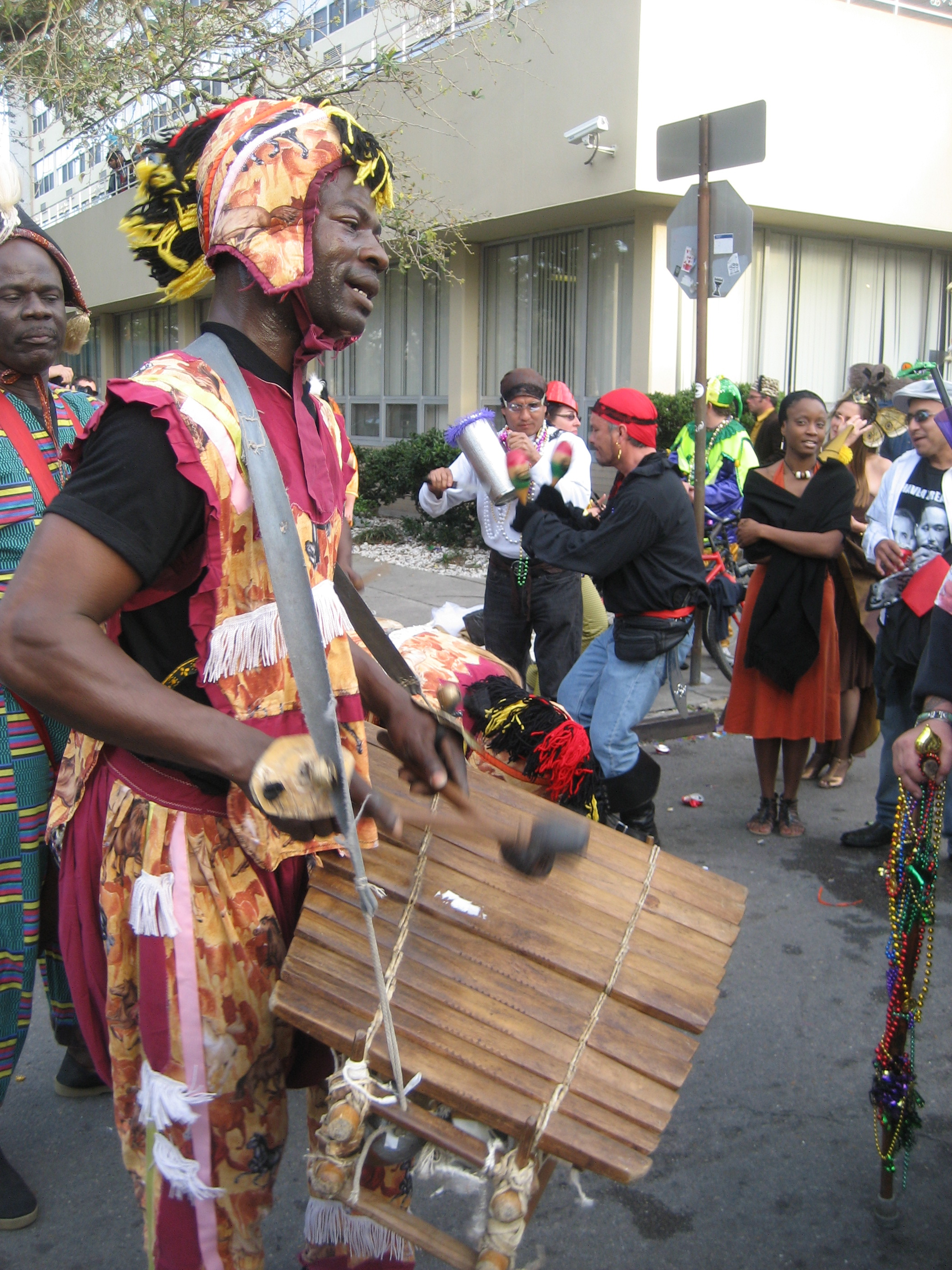
A marimba player on the streets of New Orleans, Louisiana, during Mardi Gras

Marimbas have become widely popular around the world since it was being used throughout Africa, Southeast Asia, Europe, North America, South America and Central America.

In 1850, Mexican marimbist Manuel Bolán Cruz (1810–1863), modified the old bow marimba, by the wooden straight one, lengthening the legs so that the musicians could play in a standing mode, expanded the keyboard and replaced the gourd resonators by wooden boxes.

In 1892, Mexican musician Corazón de Jesús Borras Moreno expanded the range of the marimba to include the chromatic scale by adding another row of sound bars, akin to black keys on the piano.

The name marimba was later applied to the orchestra instrument inspired by the Latin American model. In the United States, companies like J.C. Deagan and the Leedy Manufacturing Company adapted the Latin American instruments for use in Western music. Metal tubes were used as resonators, fine-tuned by rotating metal discs at the bottom; lowest note tubes were U-shaped. The marimbas were first used for light music and dance, such as vaudeville theater and comedy shows. Clair Omar Musser was a chief proponent of marimba in the United States at the time.

In 1940, the American composer Paul Creston wrote the first composition for solo marimba (Concertino for Marimba and Orchestra). French composer Darius Milhaud also helped introduce marimbas into Western classical music with his 1947 Concerto for Marimba and Vibraphone. Four-mallet grip was employed to play chords, enhancing interest for the instrument. In the late 20th century, modernist and contemporary composers found new ways to use marimba: notable examples include Leoš Janáček (Jenufa), Carl Orff (Antigonae), Karl Amadeus Hartmann, Hans Werner Henze (Elegy for Young Lovers), Pierre Boulez (Le marteau sans maître) and Steve Reich.

== Construction ==
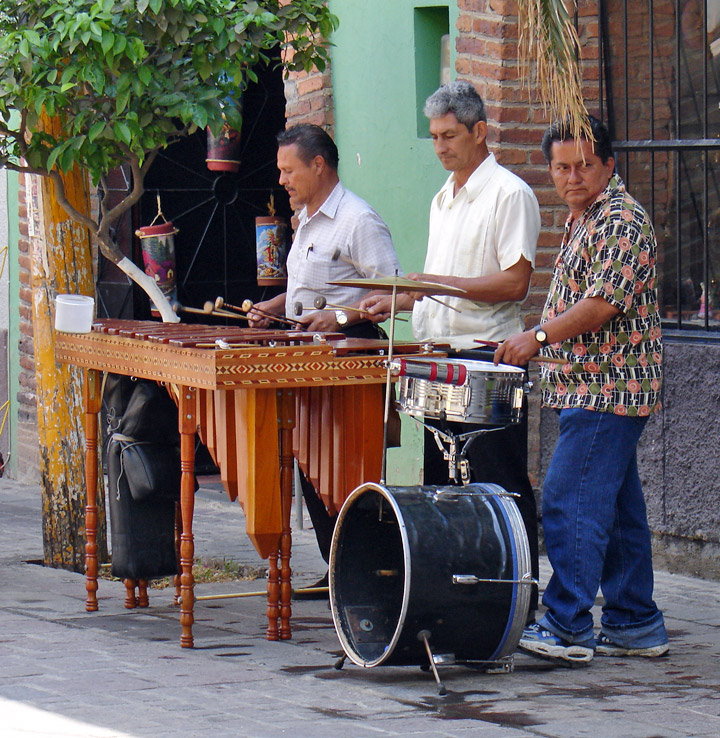
Folk and popular marimba

=== Bars ===
Marimba bars may be made either of wood or a synthetic fiberglass material. For the best sound quality, rosewood is the most desirable, while padauk is a popular affordable alternative. Synthetic fiberglass bars are often sold under trade names such as Kelon (for Ludwig-Musser), Klyperon (for J.C. Deagan), or Acoustalon (for Yamaha), among others. Bars made from synthetic materials generally fall short in sound quality and generally have a longer decay in comparison to wooden bars, but they are often less expensive and yield added durability and weather resistance, making them suitable for outdoor use. For wooden bars, changes in humidity or temperature may alter the moisture levels within the wood. This may negatively affect the pitch and tonality of the bar.

Bubinga (Guibourtia demeusei) and mahogany have also been cited as comparable to rosewood in quality for use as marimba bars. The specific rosewood, Dalbergia stevensonii, only grows in Southern Guatemala and Belize, formerly British Honduras. This wood has a Janka rating of 2200, which is about three times harder than silver maple. The bars are wider and longer at the lowest-pitched notes, and gradually get narrower and shorter as the notes get higher. During the tuning, wood is taken from the middle underside of the bar to lower the pitch. Because of this, the bars are also thinner in the lowest pitch register and thicker in the highest pitch register. While most American marimbas are tuned to the standard A4=440 Hz, many commercial marimbas are tuned to A4=442 Hz for a brighter sound for better blend with an orchestra.

Marimba bars produce their fullest sound when struck just off center, while striking the bar in the center produces a more articulate tone. On chromatic marimbas, the accidentals can also be played on the extreme front edge of the bar, away from the node (the place where the string goes through the bar) if necessary. Playing on the node produces a sonically weak tone, and the technique is only used when the player or composer is looking for a muted sound from the instrument.

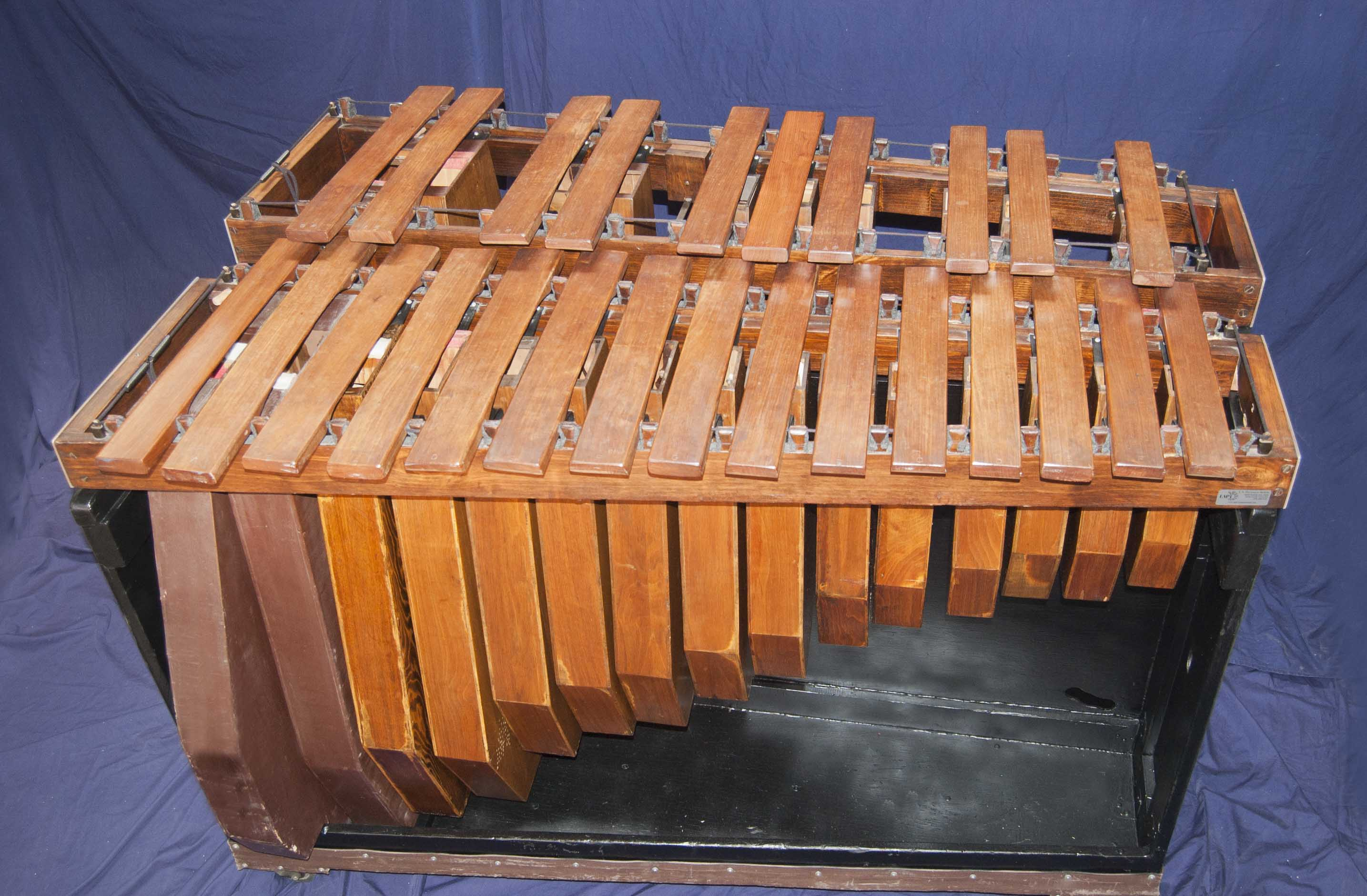
Contrabass marimba: range of G_{1}–G_{3}

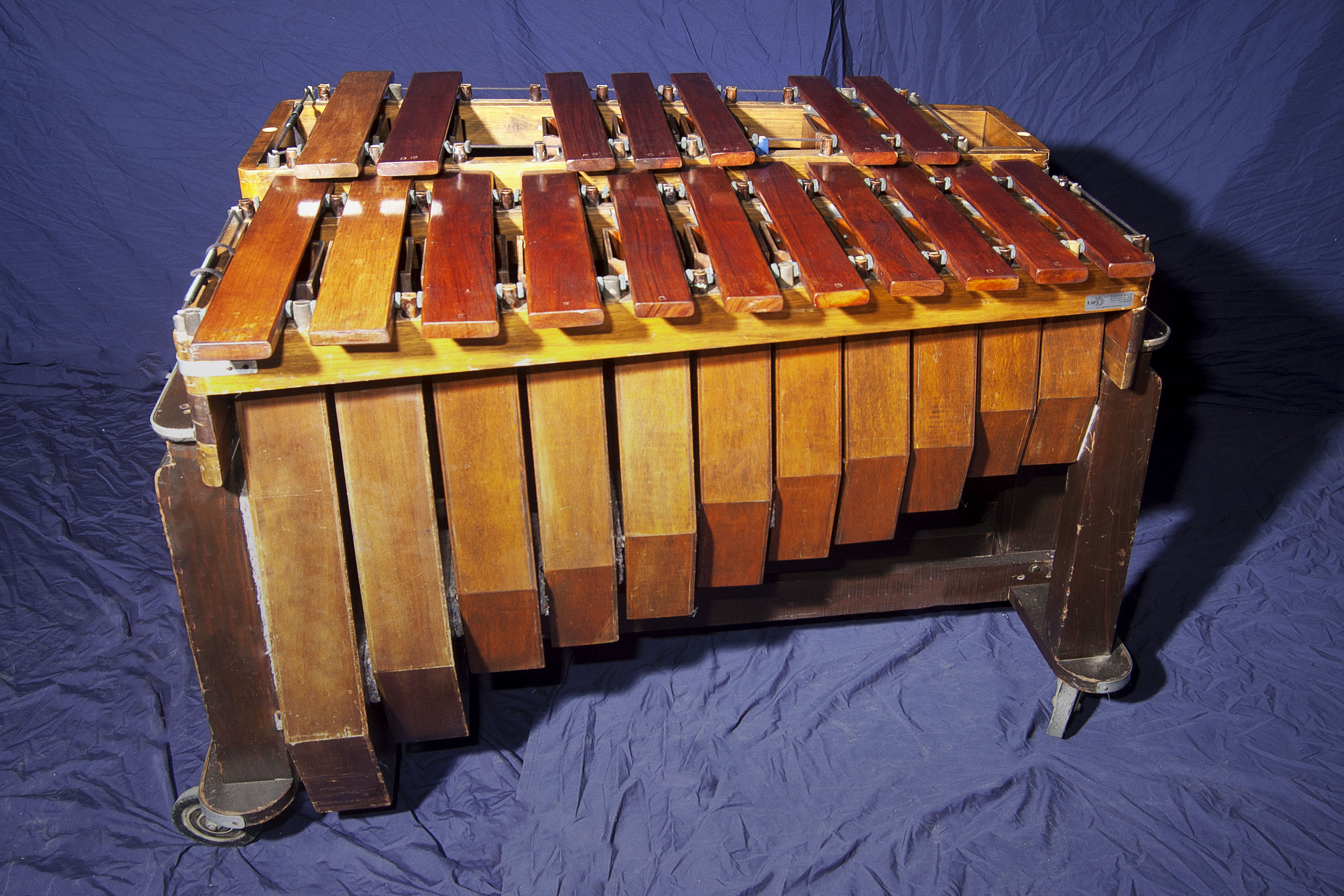
Bass marimba: range of C_{2}–F_{3}

=== Range ===
There is no standard range of the marimba, but the most common ranges are 4.3 octaves, 4.5 octaves and 5 octaves; 4, 4.6 and 5.5 octave sizes are also available.

- 4 octave: C_{3} to C_{7}.
- 4.3 octave: A_{2} to C_{7}. The .3 refers to three semitones below the 4 octave instrument. This is the most common range.
- 4.5 octave: F_{2} to C_{7}. The .5 means "half";
- 4.6 octave: E_{2} to C_{7}, one semitone below the 4.5. Useful for playing guitar literature and transcriptions.
- 5 octave: C_{2} to C_{7}, one full octave below the 4 octave instrument, useful for playing cello transcriptions, e.g., J. S. Bach's cello suites.
- 5.5 octave: 4_{1} to C_{7}.
- Bass range (varies, but examples range from G_{1}–G_{3} or C_{2}–F_{3})

The range of the marimba has been gradually expanding, with companies like Marimba One adding notes up to F above the normal high C (C_{7}) on their 5.5 octave instrument and marimba tuners adding notes lower than the low C on the 5 octave C_{2}. Adding lower notes is somewhat impractical; as the bars become bigger and the resonators become longer, the instrument must be taller and the mallets must be softer in order to produce a tone rather than just a percussive attack. Adding higher notes is also impractical because the hardness of the mallets required to produce the characteristic tone of a marimba are much too hard to play with in almost any other, lower range on the instrument.

The marimba is a non-transposing instrument with no octave displacement, unlike the xylophone, which sounds one octave higher than written, and the glockenspiel, which sounds two octaves higher than written.

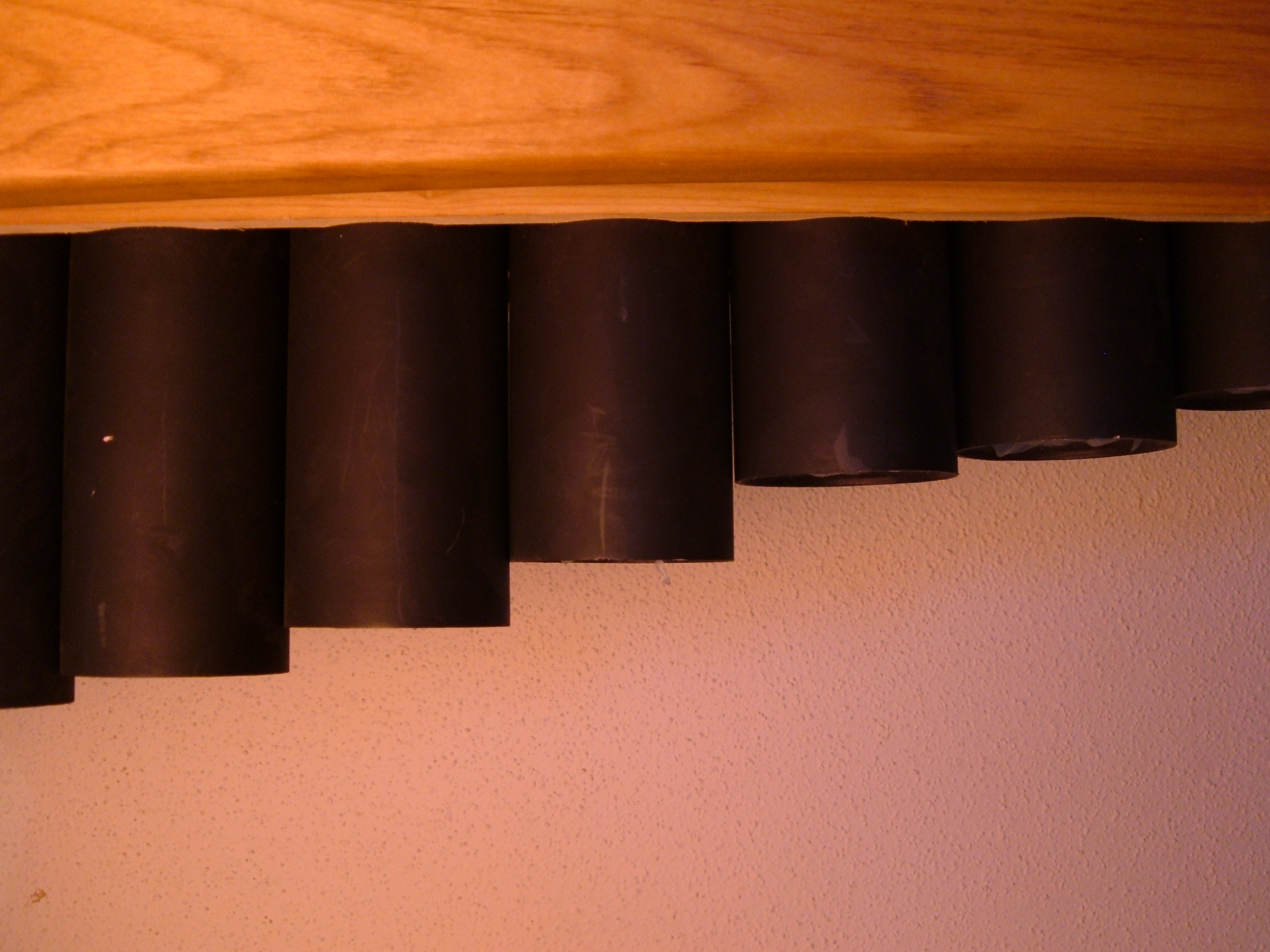
PVC resonators

=== Resonators ===
Part of the key to the marimba's rich sound are its resonators. These are tubes (usually aluminum) that hang below each bar.

In the most traditional versions, various sizes of natural gourds are attached below the keys to act as resonators; in more sophisticated versions carved wooden resonators are substituted, allowing for more precise tuning of pitch. In Central America and Mexico, a hole is often carved into the bottom of each resonator and then covered with a delicate membrane taken from the intestine of a pig to add a characteristic "buzzing" or "rattling" sound known as charleo. In more contemporary-style marimbas, wood is replaced by PVC tubing. The holes in the bottoms of the tubes are covered with a thin layer of paper to produce the buzzing noise.

The length of the resonators varies according to the frequency that the bar produces. Vibrations from the bars resonate as they pass through the tubes, which amplify the tone in a manner very similar to the way in which the body of a guitar or cello would. In instruments exceeding 4 1/2 octaves, the length of tubing required for the bass notes exceeds the height of the instrument. Some manufacturers, such as DeMorrow and Malletech, compensate for this by bending the ends of the tubes. This involves soldering smaller straight sections of tubes to form "curved" tubes. Both DeMorrow and Malletech use brass rather than aluminium. Others, such as Adams and Yamaha, expand the tubes into large box-shaped bottoms, resulting in the necessary amount of resonating space without having to extend the tubes. This result is achieved by the custom manufacturer Marimba One by widening the resonators into an oval shape, with the lowest ones reaching nearly a foot in width, and doubling the tube up inside the lowest resonators—a process known as "Haskelling", originally used in pipe organ resonators, and named for its inventor, William E. Haskell.

Resonator tuning involves adjusting "stops" in the tubes themselves to compensate for temperature and humidity conditions in the room where the instrument is stored. Some companies offer adjustment in the upper octaves only. Others do not have any adjustable stops. Still some companies (Malletech and DeMorrow) offer full-range adjustable stops.

On many marimbas, decorative resonators are added to fill the gaps in the accidental resonator bank. In addition to this, the resonator lengths are sometimes altered to form a decorative arch, such as in the Musser M-250. This does not affect the resonant properties, because the end plugs in the resonators are still placed at their respective lengths.

=== Mallets ===
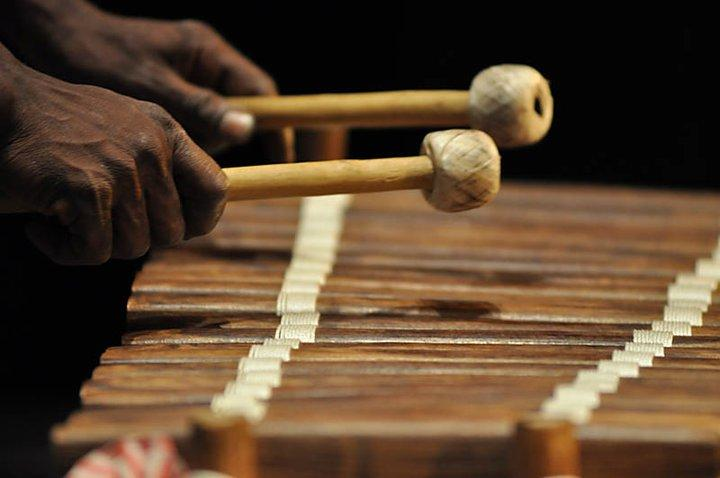
An example of the mallets used when playing a marimba

The mallet shaft is commonly made of wood, usually birch or rattan, but may also be made of fiberglass or carbon fibre. The most common diameter of the shaft is around 8 mm (5/16 in). Shafts made of rattan have a certain elasticity to them, while birch has almost no give. Professionals use both depending on their preferences, whether they are playing with two mallets or more, and which grip they use if they are using a four-mallet grip.

Appropriate mallets for the instrument depend on the range. The material at the end of the shaft is almost always a type of rubber, usually wrapped with yarn. Softer mallets are used at the lowest notes, and harder mallets are used at the highest notes. Mallets that are too hard will damage the instrument, and mallets that might be appropriate for the upper range could damage the notes in the lower range (especially on a padouk or rosewood instrument). On the lower notes, the bars are larger, and require a softer mallet to bring out a strong fundamental. Because of the need to use varying hardnesses of mallets, some players, when playing with four or more mallets, might use graduated mallets to match the bars that they are playing (softer on the left, harder on the right).

Some mallets, called "two-toned" or "multi-tonal", have a hard core, loosely wrapped with yarn. These are designed to sound articulate when playing at a loud dynamic, and broader at the quieter dynamics.

== Mallet technique ==
Modern marimba music calls for simultaneous use of between two and four mallets (sometimes up to six or eight), granting the performer the ability to play chords or music with large interval skips more easily. Multiple mallets are held in the same hand using any of a number of techniques or "grips". For four mallets (two mallets in each hand), the most common grips are the Burton grip (made popular by Gary Burton), the traditional grip (or "cross grip") and the Musser-Stevens grip (made popular by Leigh Howard Stevens). Each grip is perceived to have its own benefits and drawbacks. For example, some marimbists feel the Musser-Stevens grip is more suitable for quick interval changes and mallet independence, while the Burton grip is more suitable for stronger playing or switching between chords and single-note melody lines. The traditional grip gives a greater dynamic range and freedom of playing. The choice of grip varies by region (the Musser-Stevens grip and the Burton grip are more popular in the United States, while the traditional grip is more popular in Japan), by instrument (the Burton grip is less likely to be used on marimba than on a vibraphone) and by the preference of the individual performer.

Six-mallet grips consist of variations on these three grips. Six-mallet marimba grips have been used for years by Mexican and Central American marimbists, but they are generally considered non-standard in the Western classical canon. Keiko Abe has written a number of compositions for six mallets, including a section in her concerto Prism Rhapsody. Other marimbists/composers using this technique include Rebecca Kite (who commissioned composer Evan Hause to write Circe, a major work for six mallets, in 2001), Dean Gronemeier, Robert Paterson, and Kai Stensgaard. Paterson's grip is based on the Burton grip, and his grip and technique have been called the Paterson grip, and even the Wolverine grip. Paterson states that his technique differs from others in that there is less emphasis places on block chords on the lower bank of notes (the naturals or white notes) and more emphasis on independence, one-handed rolls, and alternations between mallets 12-3 or 1–23 in the left hand (or 45-6 or 4–56 in the right hand, respectively), and so on. Ludwig Albert published at first a work for eight mallets and demonstrated the Ludwig Albert eight-mallet grip based on the traditional grip from 1995.

== Repertoire ==
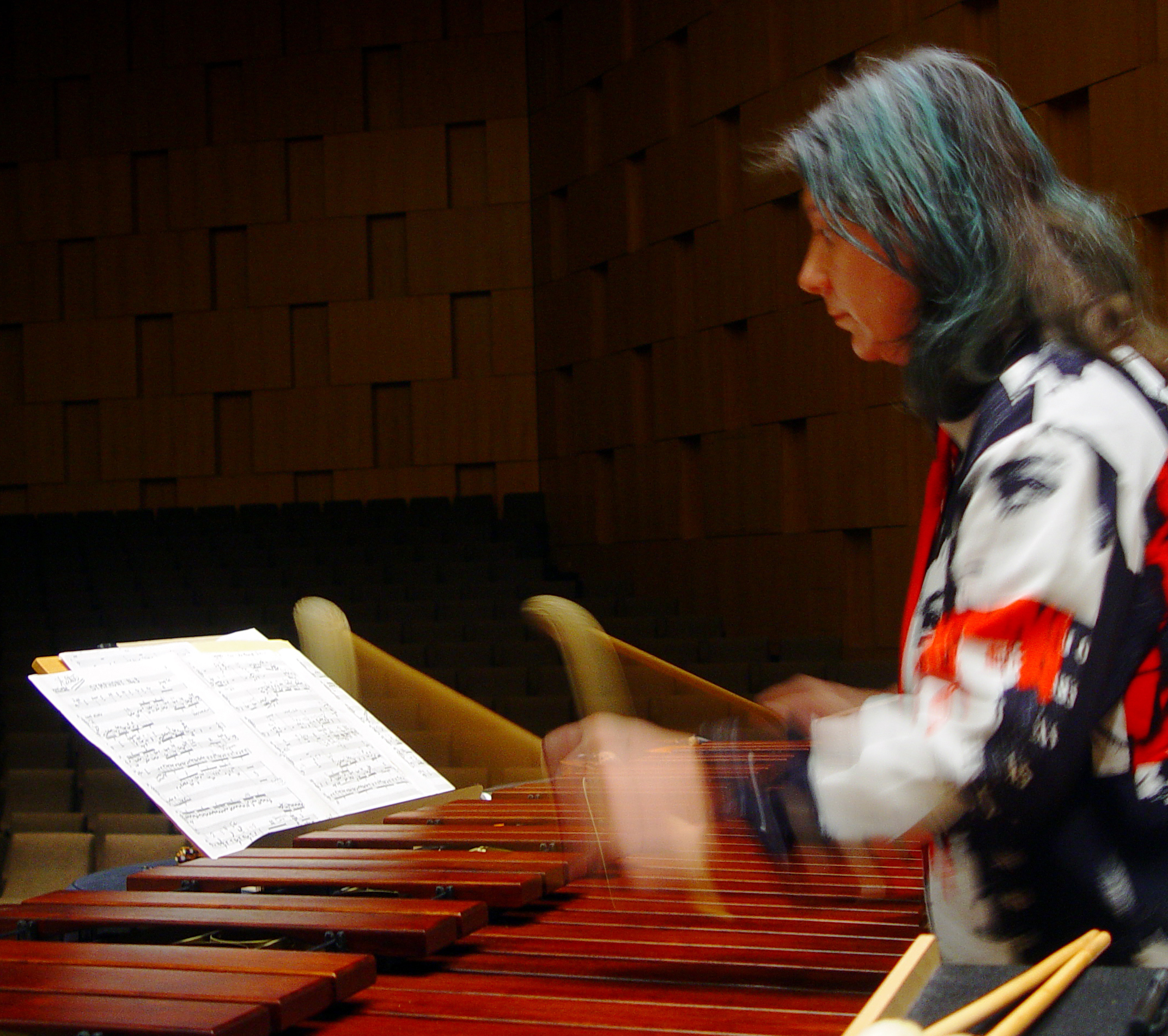
A marimba player for the NDR Radiophilharmonie

=== Orchestra ===
The marimba is less used by composers than other keyboards from orchestral percussion section, although its interest increased after 1950 such as in Le marteau sans maître by Pierre Boulez.

=== Concertos ===
The first solo marimba concerto, Concertino for Marimba, was composed by Paul Creston in 1940, after a commission by Frédérique Petrides. The Concertino for Marimba premiered on 29 April 1940 in Carnegie Hall with marimba soloist Ruth Stuber Jeanne and the Orchestrette Classique. The second concerto for the marimba, Concerto for Marimba, Vibraphone and Orchestra, was written by Darius Milhaud in 1947.

The Oregon Symphony Orchestra commissioned Tomáš Svoboda to compose Concerto for Marimba and Orchestra, Op. 148, in 1995. A recording of the piece by the orchestra and Niel DePonte was nominated for the 2004 Grammy Award for Best Instrumental Soloist(s) Performance (with orchestra).

Other prominent concertos include Concerto No. 1 for Marimba and String Orchestra written in 1986 by Ney Rosauro and Concerto for Marimba and String Orchestra written in 2006 by Emmanuel Séjourné.

=== Solos ===
The marimba is the most popular solo keyboard percussion instrument in classical music. Popular marimba solos range from beginner solos such as Yellow After the Rain and Sea Refractions by Mitchell Peters to more advanced works such as Variations on Lost Love by David Maslanka, Rhythmic Caprice by Leigh Howard Stevens and Khan Variations by Alejandro Viñao.

== Popular music ==
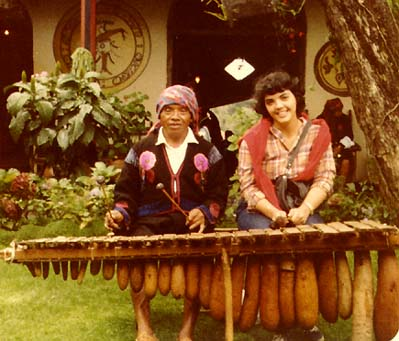
Folk marimba with gourds, Highland Guatemala

Traditional marimba bands are especially popular in Guatemala, where they are the national symbol of culture, but are also strongly established in the Mexican states of Chiapas, Tabasco, and Oaxaca. They are also very popular in other Central American nations such as Honduras, El Salvador, Nicaragua, and Costa Rica, as well as among Afro-Ecuadorians and Afro-Colombians.

There have been numerous jazz vibraphonists who also played the marimba. Notable among them are Gary Burton, David Friedman, Stefon Harris, Bobby Hutcherson, Joe Locke, Steve Nelson, Red Norvo, Dave Pike, Gloria Parker, Dave Samuels, and Arthur Lipner.

Marimbist and vibraphonist Julius Wechter was the leader of a popular 1960s Latin-flavored band called Baja Marimba Band. Herb Alpert and his Tijuana Brass made frequent use of the marimba.

Ruth Underwood played an electrically amplified marimba in Frank Zappa's The Mothers of Invention.

The Rolling Stones' 1966 song "Under My Thumb" prominently features a marimba, played by Brian Jones.

A marimba solo by Bo Wagner (whose mallet teacher was Emil Richards) was featured in the hit 1975 Starbuck song "Moonlight Feels Right". Wagner was one of the first players to use an amplified marimba, making it more feasible to balance its sound against guitars and electronic keyboards. At a 2013 revival performance in Chastain Park, Atlanta he used an electronic instrument (a MalletKAT Pro).

In 1981, percussionist Budgie introduced the marimba on the Creatures' debut EP, Wild Things.

The 1982 Toto hit "Africa" prominently features the marimba, played by Joe Porcaro.

In 1982, English rock band The Psychedelic Furs released "Love My Way," which includes a marimba played by Todd Rundgren.

Siouxsie Sioux in 1983 with her second band the Creatures, scored with the marimba as the main instrument a UK top twenty five single with "Miss the Girl" and a UK top twenty album with Feast. Her band performed the single on BBC television's popular show, Top of the Pops, introducing the marimba to a large audience. Siouxsie and the Banshees 1984 song "Swimming Horses also features a marimba.

The version of the song "Tonight" by David Bowie and Iggy Pop featured on Bowie's 1984 album of the same title includes a marimba.

Peter Gabriel's 1985 soundtrack album Birdy includes the song "Slow Marimbas."

== See also ==
- Quadrangularis Reversum
