= Haskell House =

Haskell House may refer to:

== in the United States ==
- Ida M. Rice House, Colorado Springs, Colorado, also known as Haskell House, listed on the National Register of Historic Places (NRHP)
- Haskell House, Denver, Colorado, listed on the NRHP in Denver County, Colorado
- Haskell-Long House, Middleburg, Florida, NRHP-listed
- Squire Ignatius Haskell House, Deer Isle, Hancock County, Maine, NRHP-listed
- Edward H. Haskell Home for Nurses, Boston, Massachusetts, NRHP-listed
- William Haskell House, Gloucester, Massachusetts, NRHP-listed
- Charles Haskell House, Newton, Massachusetts, NRHP-listed
- Winslow–Haskell Mansion, Newton, Massachusetts, NRHP-listed
- Haskell's Bloomfield Villa, Montclair, Essex County, New Jersey
- Haskell House (New Windsor, New York), in Orange County, NRHP-listed

== in New Zealand ==
- Haskell House, one of Kaiapoi's oldest buildings; demolished in June 2013 after earthquake damage
