= Viñao =

Viñao is a surname. Notable people with the surname include:

- Alejandro Viñao (born 1951), Argentine composer
- Ezequiel Viñao (born 1960), Argentine composer
