= William Haskell =

William Haskell may refer to:

- William E. Haskell (1865–1927), American organ-builder and inventor
- William N. Haskell (1878–1952), United States Army lieutenant general
- William T. Haskell (1818–1859), American politician
- Will Haskell (born 1996), American politician
