= Frank Haskell =

Frank Haskell may refer to:

- Frank A. Haskell (1828–1864), Union Army officer during the American Civil War
- Frank W. Haskell (1843–1903), member of the U.S. Army, who fought for the Union in the American Civil War, and Medal of Honor recipient
