= Haskell School =

Haskell School can refer to:

- Haskell School (Troy, New York), a former school and historic building in Troy, New York
- Haskell School (Boston, Massachusetts), one of the schools that formed The Cambridge School of Weston
