= Mount Denucé =

Mountain in Graham Land, Antarctica

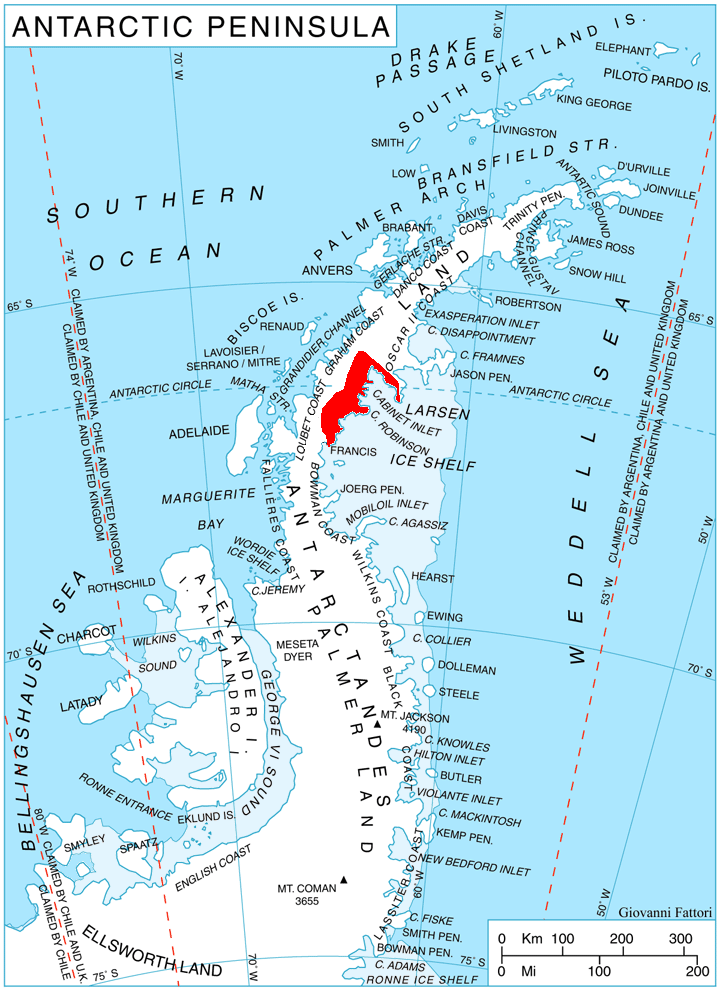

Highest point
- Elevation: 1,535 metres (5,040 ft)
- Coordinates: 66°43′S 64°12′W

Mount Denucé (66°43′S 64°12′W) is a rounded mountain, 1,535 metres (5,040 ft) high, between Mount Hulth and Mount Haskell on the southwest side of Cabinet Inlet, on the east coast of Graham Land. It was charted by the Falkland Islands Dependencies Survey (FIDS) and photographed from the air by the Ronne Antarctic Research Expedition in December 1947. It was named by the FIDS for Jean Denucé, a Belgian polar bibliographer.
