= 3rd Maine Infantry Regiment =

- Active: June 4, 1861, to June 28, 1864
- Country: United States
- Allegiance: Union
- Branch: United States Army
- Type: Infantry
- Engagements: American Civil War: First Battle of Bull Run; Peninsula Campaign; Battle of 2nd Bull Run; Battle of Fredericksburg; Battle of Chancellorsville; Battle of Gettysburg; Battle of the Wilderness; Battle of Cold Harbor

Commanders
- Colonel: Oliver O. Howard

Insignia
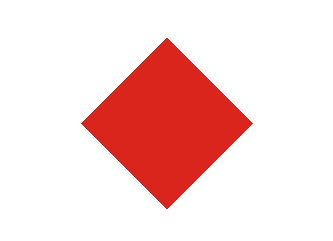
- 1st Division, III Corps

The 3rd Maine Infantry Regiment was mustered in at Augusta, Maine, for three years' service on June 4, 1861, and were mustered out on June 28, 1864. Veterans who had re-enlisted and those recruits still liable to serve were transferred to 17th Maine Volunteer Infantry Regiment.

== Detailed History ==
This regiment responded to the first call for troops with promptness and alacrity. It was rendezvoused on the state house grounds at Augusta and was composed mainly of Kennebec lumbermen. The regiment was most fortunate in having for its colonel Oliver O. Howard, who rose rapidly to the rank of major-general and gained for himself a name distinguished among the nation's heroes. During the long three years' service the regiment was successively commanded by Maj. Staples and Capt. Moses B. Lakeman of Co. I, Lieut.-Col. Tucker having resigned to become brigade quartermaster. On the resignation of Lieut.-Col. Tucker, Capt. Sampson of Co. D, Capt. Lakeman and Adjt. Burt served as lieutenant-colonel in the order named. Succeeding Henry G. Staples as major were Adjt. Burt and Capt. William C. Morgan. Of the original companies of the regiment Co. A (Bath City Greys) had existed under former militia laws and the others were new organizations. The regiment was mustered into the United States service on June 4, 1861, and left the state for the front the next day. Perhaps no regiment from the state saw more fighting or rendered more distinguished service. From the First Battle of Bull Run, until the battle of Cold Harbor, June 3, 1864, the regiment participated in most of the important battles and movements of the Army of the Potomac. The operations of the so-called "Stove-Pipe Artillery" commenced with this regiment. While encamped at Flag Hill, Va., they employed the ruse of mounting a stove-pipe on wheels, and drew 12 shots from the enemy at their cannon. The loss of the 3rd in killed and wounded at the Battle of Fair Oaks was nearly one-third of the men engaged. It was in this engagement that Sergt.-Maj. F. W. Haskell of Waterville so greatly distinguished himself as to win the commendation of his colonel and of the entire regiment. The 3rd gave an excellent account of itself in the battle of Gettysburg. At the close of the second day's fighting Gen. Sickles declared that, "The little 3d Me. saved the army today." Its loss at Gettysburg was 113 killed, wounded and missing. On the return of the regiment to Augusta, June 11, 1864, only 17 officers and 176 enlisted men were left to be mustered out. Sixty-four of these men reenlisted, and together with the recruits were transferred to the 17th Me. Not one of the original field and staff officers returned with the regiment and only one of the original captains—the veteran Moses B. Lakeman—who returned in command of the regiment.

== Colonels ==
- Colonel Oliver Otis Howard
- Colonel Moses B. Lakeman
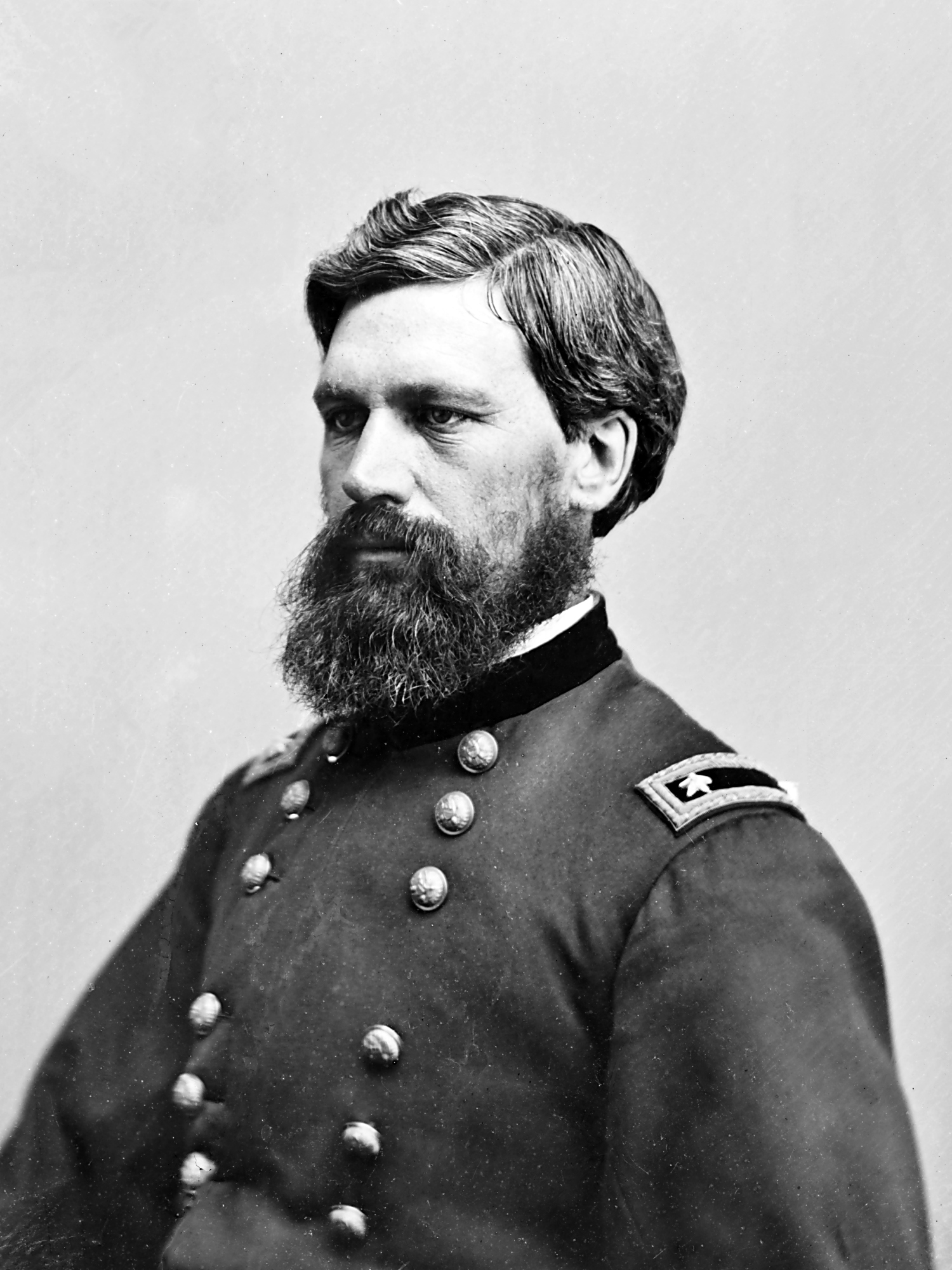
  Oliver Otis Howard, First Commander of the 3rd Maine

== Casualties and total strength ==
The 3rd Maine enrolled 1,586 men during its existence. It lost 10 officers and 124 enlisted men killed in action or died of wounds received in battle and an additional 1 officer and 148 enlisted men died of disease. 33 men died in Confederate prisons. Total fatalities for the regiment were 316.

== See also ==
- List of Maine Civil War units
- Maine in the American Civil War
- Frank W. Haskell
