= Haskell (given name) =

Haskell or Haskel is a masculine given name which may refer to:

- Haskell V. Anderson III (born 1943), American actor
- Haskel Ayers (1936–2020), American auctioneer and politician
- Haskell Boggs (1909–2003), American cinematographer
- Haskell Cohen (1914–2000), public relations director of the National Basketball Association (1950–1969), creator of the NBA All-Star Game
- Haskell Curry (1900–1982), American mathematician and logician
- Haskell Garrett (born 1998), American college football player
- Haskel Greenfield (born 1953), American archaeologist
- Haskell Harr (1894–1986), American percussionist, composer, and bandleader
- Haskel Lookstein (born 1932), American Modern Orthodox rabbi
- Haskell Monroe (1931–2017), American educator and university administrator
- Haskell L. Nichols (1896–1991), American politician
- Haskell Noyes (1886–1948), American college basketball player and coach and conservationist
- Haskell Ross (1908–1966), American racehorse trainer
- Haskell Sadler (1935–1994), American blues singer, songwriter, and guitarist
- Haskell Small (1948–2024), American composer, pianist and music teacher
- Haskel Stanback (born 1952), American former National Football League player
- Haskell Wexler (1922–2015), American cinematographer, film producer and director

== See also ==
- William Haskell Coffin (1878–1941), often known by his middle name, American painter
