= Chaskel =

Chaskel is a Yiddish or Hebrew given name. It is a diminutive of Yehezkel or Ezekiel. It may also be spelled Haskell, Chaskiel, Chazkel, Chzekel, Cheskel.

Chaskel may refer to:

- Chaskel Besser (1923–2010), Orthodox rabbi
- Pedro Chaskel (born 1932), Jewish German-Chilean film director; see Jackal of Nahueltoro

== See also ==
- Haskell (disambiguation)
- Sassoon Eskell
- Bernhard von Eskeles
