= Haskelite Building =

- Haskell Manufacturing Company Building
- U.S. National Register of Historic Places
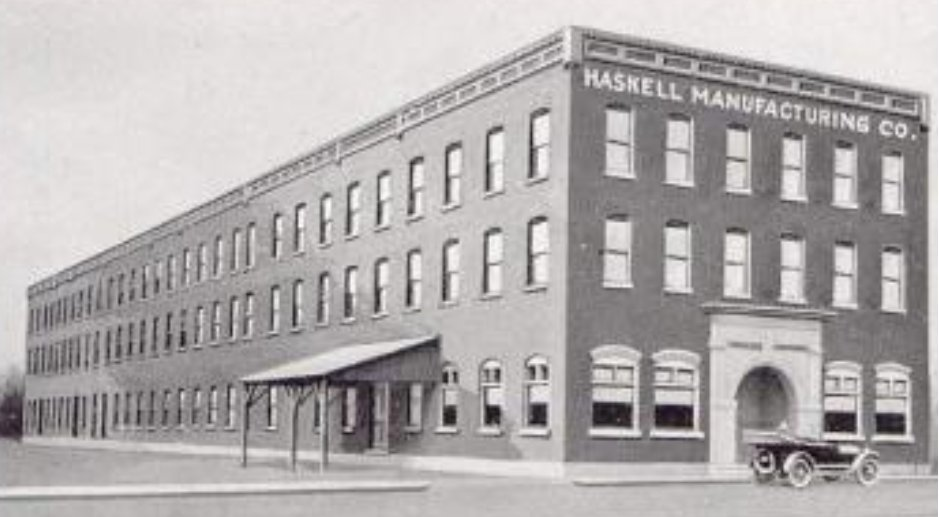
- Building in 1917

- Location within Michigan Location within the United States
- Interactive map showing building location
- Location: 801 North Rowe St., Ludington, Michigan
- Coordinates: 43°57′54″N 86°26′43″W
- Built: 1892
- NRHP reference No.: 1100005785
- Added to NRHP: November 10, 2020; 5 years ago

The Haskelite Building, also known as the Haskell Manufacturing Company Building, is a former factory building located at 801 N. Rowe Street, Ludington, Mason County, Michigan. The building was added to the National Register of Historic Places on November 10, 2022. In 2022, the building was refurbished into residential apartments, known as the Lofts on Rowe.

== Description ==
The structure is a 45,000-square-foot, rectangular, three-story factory built with load-bearing brick walls and a flat roof, and a stone and concrete foundation. The main section was constructed between 1890 and 1895, with an addition in 1904 to 1911 that was twice the size of the original building. The main entry has a cream brick surround within a large round-arch with a keystone. The entry is flanked by two large segmental-arch windows containing a single pane of glass and a transom above. The second and third floors each contain six 9-over-9 wood-sash, double-hung, segmental-arch windows.

== History ==
Four Ludington businessmen founded the Development Company of Ludington in 1892. Their aim was to develop a portion of the city into a manufacturing park and entice companies to move their manufacturing operations to Ludington. To that end, they platted out an addition to the city, laid in utilities, and constructed a railroad spur. They also built three manufacturing plants along Rowe Street, including this building. The first company to move into this building was the Mendelson Manufacturing Company, which made men's clothing. After the clothing company went out of business in 1894, the building remained empty until 1904 when furniture makers Tubbs Manufacturing Company moved in. Tubbs expanded the building to manufacture wood products, and stayed in residence until 1911.

In 1911, Henry L. Haskell's Carrom Company moved into the building. The company first made the Carrom game at the plant. Meanwhile, Haskell experimented with new ideas, and ultimately developed a waterproof glue out of blood albumin in 1913. He used this glue to glue together thin plies of wood, naming the resulting plywood after himself, calling it Haskelite. From this plywood, he made at the factory on N. Rowe Street airplane body parts and was the largest manufacturer in the United States at the time. Haskell then in 1916 formed the Haskell Manufacturing Company and started making canoes and boats on a mass-production basis from Haskelite plywood. Haskell used the moldable Haskelite waterproof plywood to construct canoes and boats, and also body parts for trucks, buses, automobiles, and airplanes.

Haskell opened a second factory plant in Grand Rapids to make plywood on a larger scale and in the 1930s consolidated operations there. The Haskelite Building in Ludington was then used less and less as time went on for production of plywood. The building was next occupied by the Civilian Conservation Corps in 1940. The Wolverine Sportswear Company occupied the building starting in 1944. It made sportswear producing coats and jackets at the building for forty-five years. The final use as a commercial building was by Change Parts who occupied it from 1989 to 2019 making packaging equipment.

The owners of the building then donated it for conversion to affordable housing. The newly refurbished Lofts on Rowe apartments opened in 2022. The building now contains 67 units, split between studios, one bedroom, two bedroom, and three bedroom apartments.

== Haskelite Building in 2017 ==
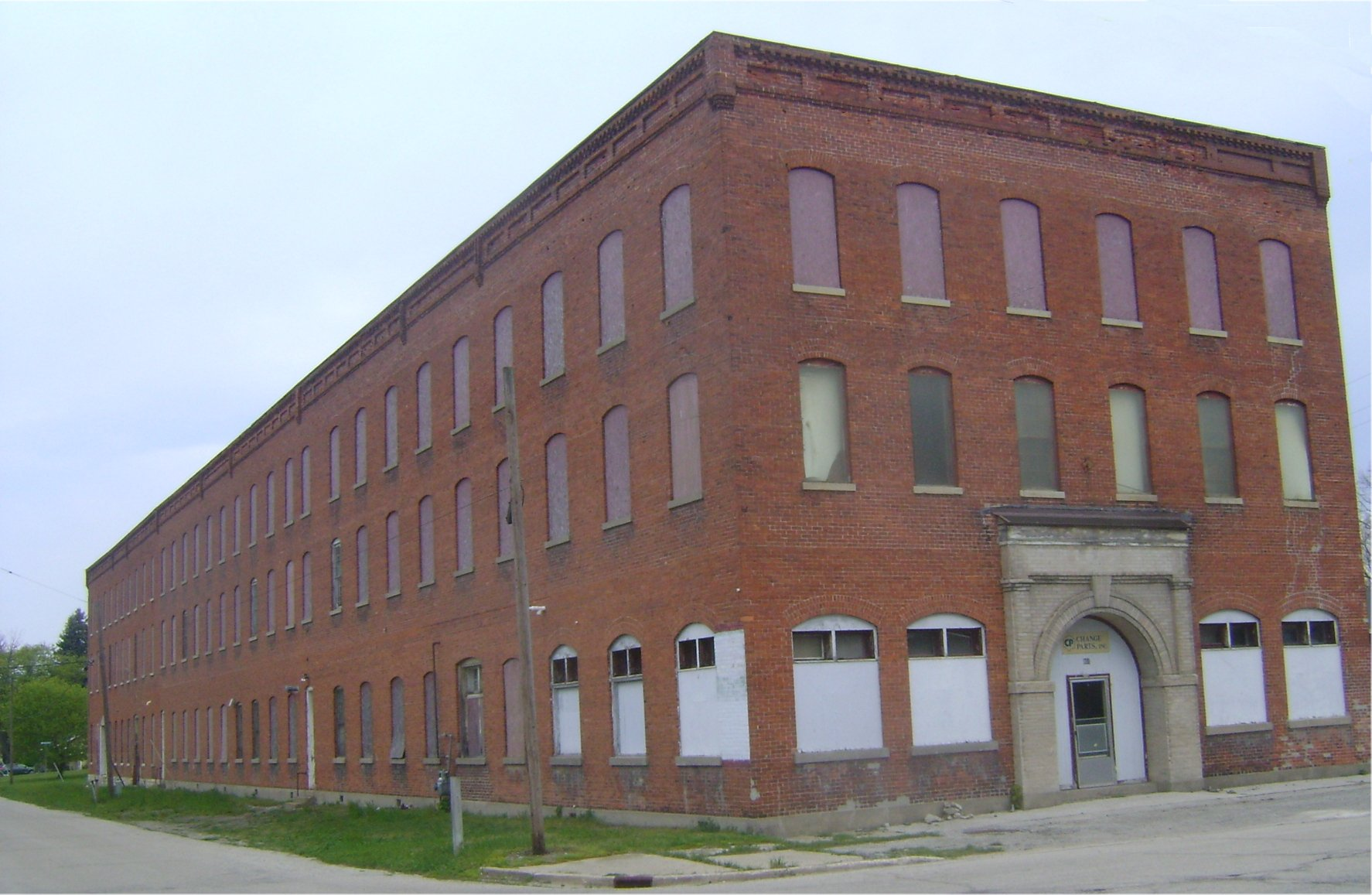
Haskelite building, SE

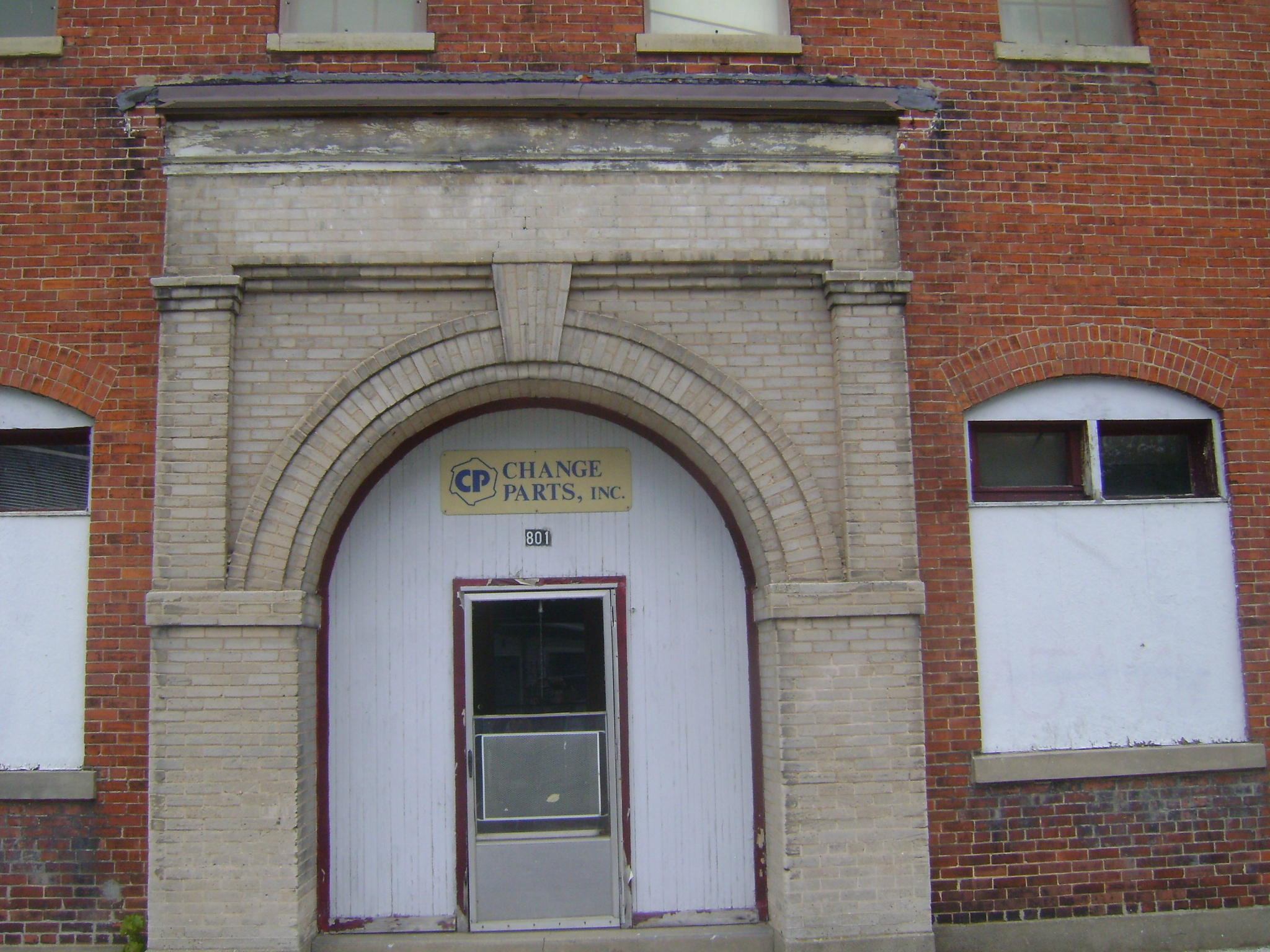
Haskelite building, East
"Change Parts" above door

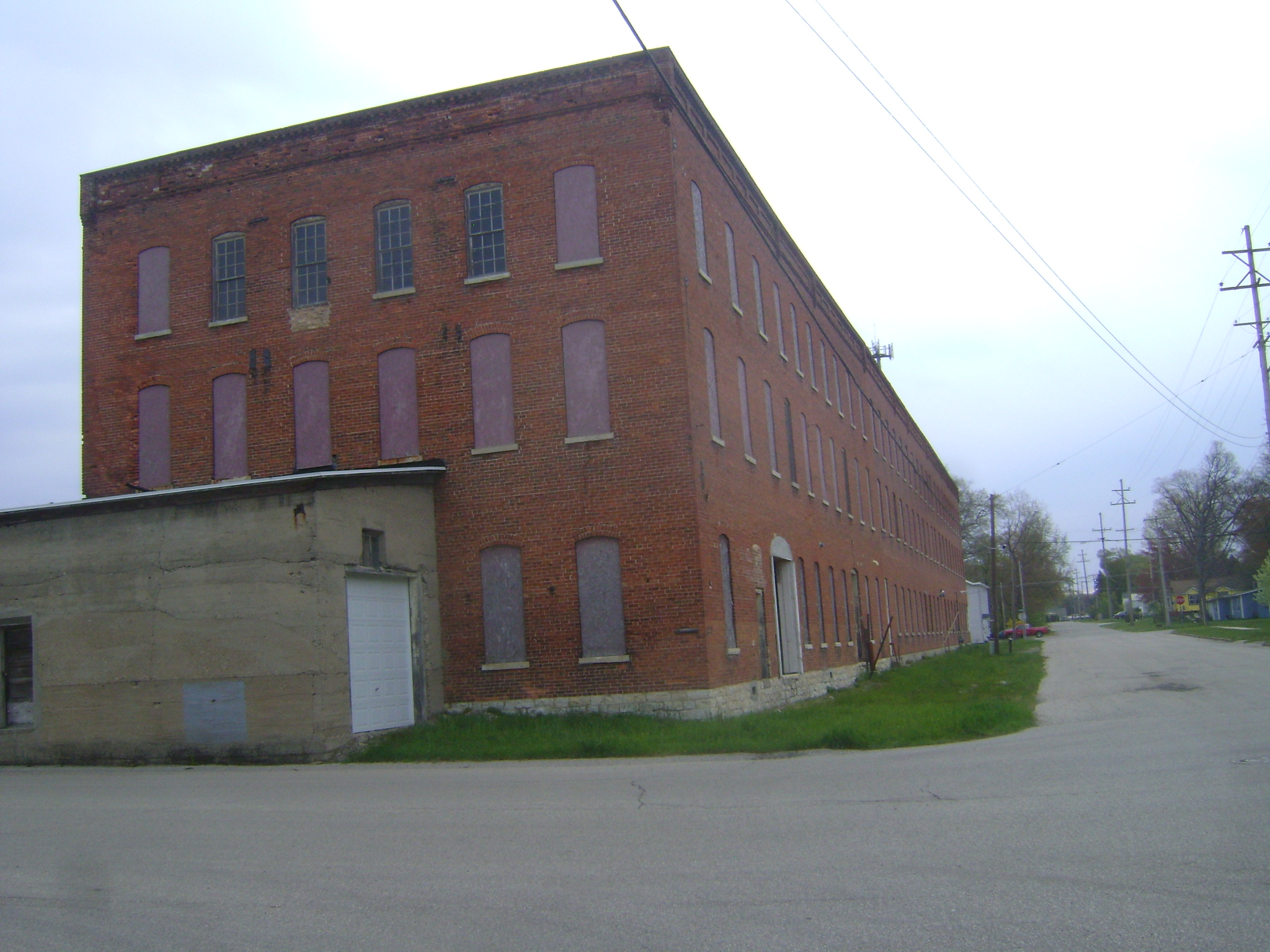
Haskelite building, SW

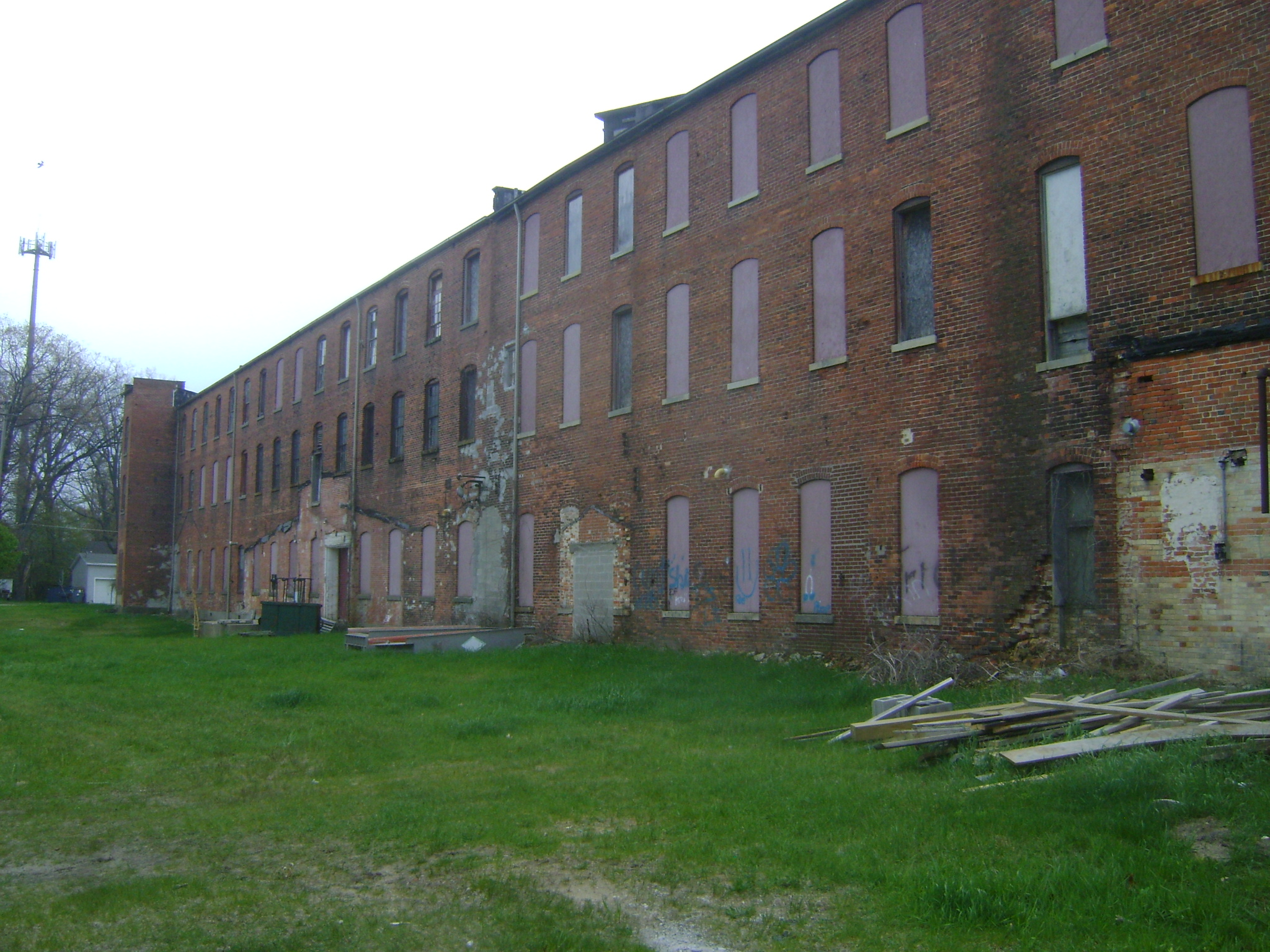
Haskelite building, North
