= Haskell Township =

Haskell Township may refer to:

- Haskell Township, Saline County, Arkansas
- Haskell Township, Haskell County, Kansas
- Haskell Township, Coal County, Oklahoma, an Oklahoma township
- Haskell Township, Tillman County, Oklahoma, an Oklahoma township

== See also ==
- Haskell (disambiguation)
