= Khan Variations =

2001 marimba composition by Alejandro Viñao

Khan Variations is a musical composition for 5 octave marimba written by Alejandro Viñao in 2001. The piece was commissioned by twelve percussion educators, including Michael Burritt, Nancy Zeltsman, Robert van Sice, and Gordon Stout. It is structured as an uninterrupted set of 8 rhythmic variations lasting approximately 10 minutes and is considered one of the most challenging works in the marimba repertoire, both from a technical and musical point of view.

The piece has featured in the repertoire of many international marimba competitions such as the International Marimba Competition, the Taiwan Marimba Competition, and the Percussive Arts Society marimba competition. Khan Variations has been recorded by a number of artists and was featured on the album Percussive Counterpoint by Svet Stoyanov.
