= Charles Haskell House =

Historic house in Massachusetts, United States

- U.S. National Register of Historic Places
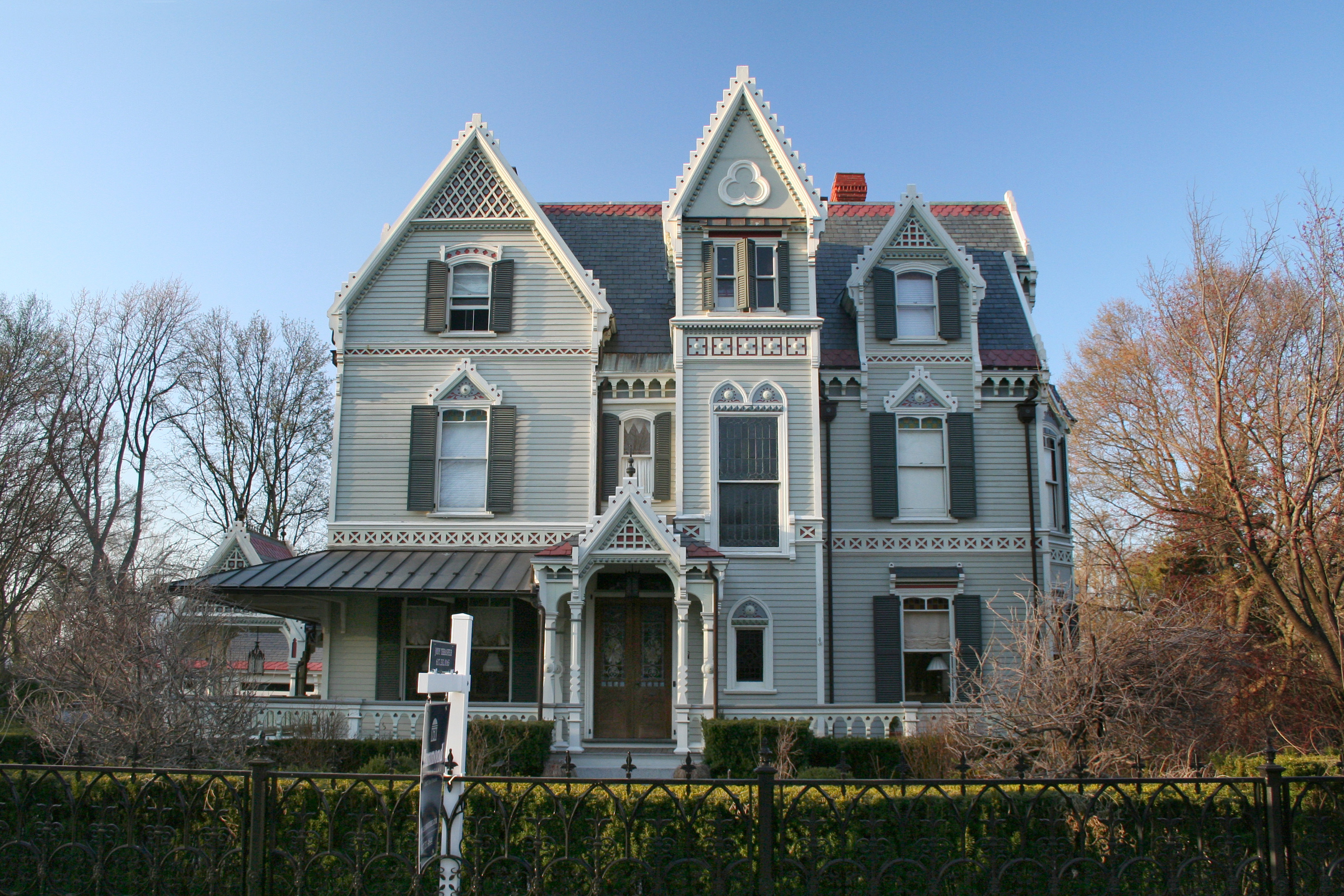

- Location within Massachusetts Location within the United States
- Location: 27 Sargent St., Newton, Massachusetts
- Coordinates: 42°20′49″N 71°10′58″W
- Built: 1879
- Architectural style: Gothic, High Victorian Gothic
- MPS: Newton MRA
- NRHP reference No.: 86001812
- Added to NRHP: September 04, 1986

The Charles Haskell House is a historic house located at 27 Sargent Street in Newton, Massachusetts.

== Description and history ==
This 2 1/2-story wood-frame house was built in 1879, and is one of Newton's finest high-style Gothic Revival houses; the style is one not frequently seen in the city. It is extensively decorated with gingerbread trim, including the repetition of steeply pitched points in the gables and between the porch balusters. Charles Haskell, for whom it was built, was a Boston-based leather merchant.

The house was listed on the National Register of Historic Places on September 4, 1986.

== See also ==
- National Register of Historic Places listings in Newton, Massachusetts
