= Haskelite =

Brand of plywood by Haskelite Manufacturing Corporation

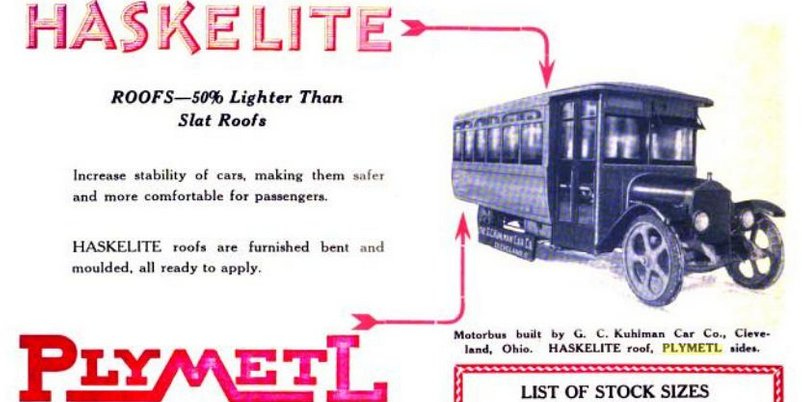
Haskelite and PlyMetl plywood panels advertised in a 1922 company catalog

Haskelite is the brand name of a plywood, once made by the Michigan-based Haskelite Manufacturing Corporation. It was made from waterproof glue developed by Henry L. Haskell. The moldable plywood was originally called Ser-O-Ply. It was used in the construction of various vehicles including military tanks, boats, airplanes, buses, trucks, and automobiles. The plywood was manufactured with different characteristics depending on particular needs and then given a brand name.

== Background ==
Haskell invented a process for making a waterproof glue called "black albumin glue" which was used to bond wood. The sheets made this way were eventually given the brand trade name of "Haskelite" after the inventor.

== Airplanes ==
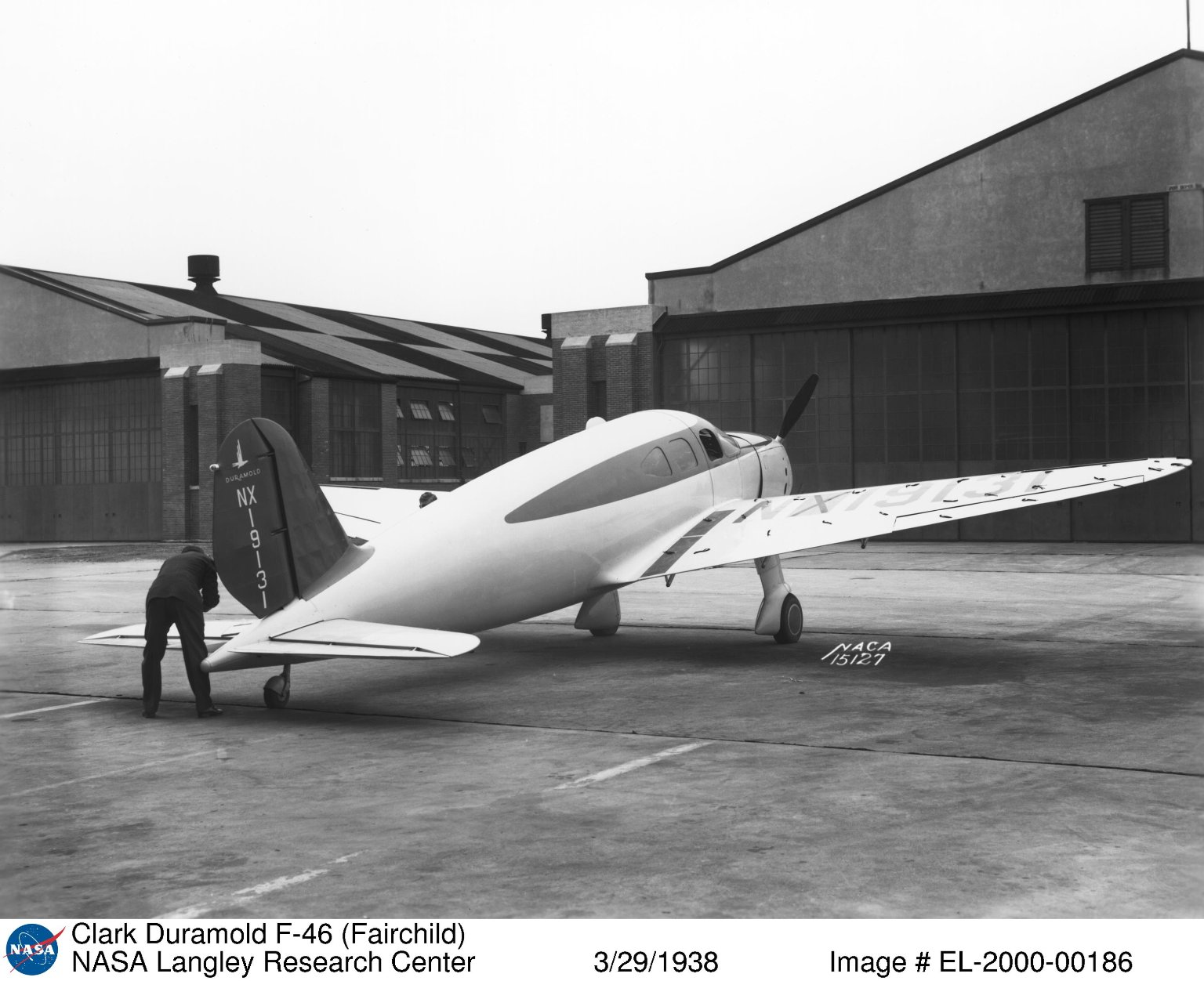
Fairchild F-46 aircraft of 1938

Haskell plywood was used for construction of experimental and commercial aircraft. The first successful commercial airplane it was used on was the 1937 Fairchild Aircraft F-46.

The company produced plywood for use in World War I aircraft.

=== Duramold ===
In 1939 a waterproof plywood called Duramold, consisting of thin veneers of wood and cloth joined using glue, heat and pressure, and designed for aircraft construction was invented.

The General Bakelite Company and Haskelite Manufacturing joined the Clark Aircraft Company of Hagerstown, Maryland to manufacture planes designed by Virginius E. Clark using Duramold.

== Boats and canoes ==
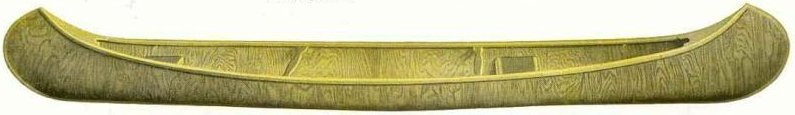
A 1917 Haskell canoe

Haskelite was also used to make watercraft at the Haskelite Building, their factory in Ludington, Michigan.

== Sources ==
- Beld, Gordon G. (2012). The Early Days of Aviation in Grand Rapids. Charleston, South Carolina: Arcadia Publishing. ISBN 978-1-61423-805-8. OCLC 945368042.
