= Mount Haskell =

Mountain in Graham Land, Antarctica

Haskell
- Location within Antarctica

Highest point
- Elevation: 1,480 m (4,860 ft)
- Coordinates: 66°45′S 64°16′W

Geography
- Location: Graham Land, Antarctica

Mount Haskell is a buttress-type mountain rising to 1,480 metres (4,860 ft) on the southwest side of Cabinet Inlet, situated between Mount Denucé and Mount Holmes on the eastern coast of Graham Land, Antarctica. The mountain was charted in 1947 by the Falkland Islands Dependencies Survey, who named it after Daniel C. Haskell, an American bibliographer from the New York Public Library, recognized for his work, The United States Exploring Expedition, 1838–42, and its Publications, 1844–1874.
