= Oscar Haskell =

New Zealand cricketer

Personal information
- Full name: Oscar Hungerford Haskell
- Born: 24 April 1857; Brighton, Colony of Tasmania
- Died: 3 September 1943 (aged 86); Southport, Queensland, Australia
- Batting: Left-handed

Domestic team information
- Years: Team
- 1877/78–1889/90: Otago
- Source: ESPNcricinfo, 13 May 2016

Oscar Hungerford "Jim" Haskell (24 April 1857 – 3 September 1943) was a New Zealand cricketer. He played six first-class matches for Otago between the 1877–78 and 1889–90 seasons.

Haskell was born at Brighton in the newly founded Colony of Tasmania in 1857. His father, Thomas Henry Haskell, had been born in England in 1819 and was a senior legal clerk in what was then called Van Dieman's Land, having originally moved to Hobart with his parents in the early 1820s.

As a cricketer, Haskell was well known in Otago and was considered "one of the best Otago cricketers of his day". He played in a side of 22 for Otago against the touring Australians in January 1878, before making his first-class debut later in the season, playing against Canterbury in Dunedin. At the time Otago typically played just one match that has been given first-class status in each season, usually with Canterbury as the opposition, and Haskell played for the representative side in each of the next four seasons. At this time he was considered a household name in Otago and as "among the votaries of the game. He and William Crawshaw were considered "a brilliant pair of batsmen and fieldsmen", Haskell often fielding as long stop.

By the time of his final first-class match, a fixture against Auckland during the 1889–90 season, Haskell was being described in the Dunedin press as "the old popular favourite". In his six first-class matches he scored 78 runs with a highest score of 34 made in 1881–82. He also took three wickets.

Haskell died 1943 at Southport in Queensland, Australia. He was aged 86.
