= Edward H. Haskell Home for Nurses =

- U.S. National Register of Historic Places
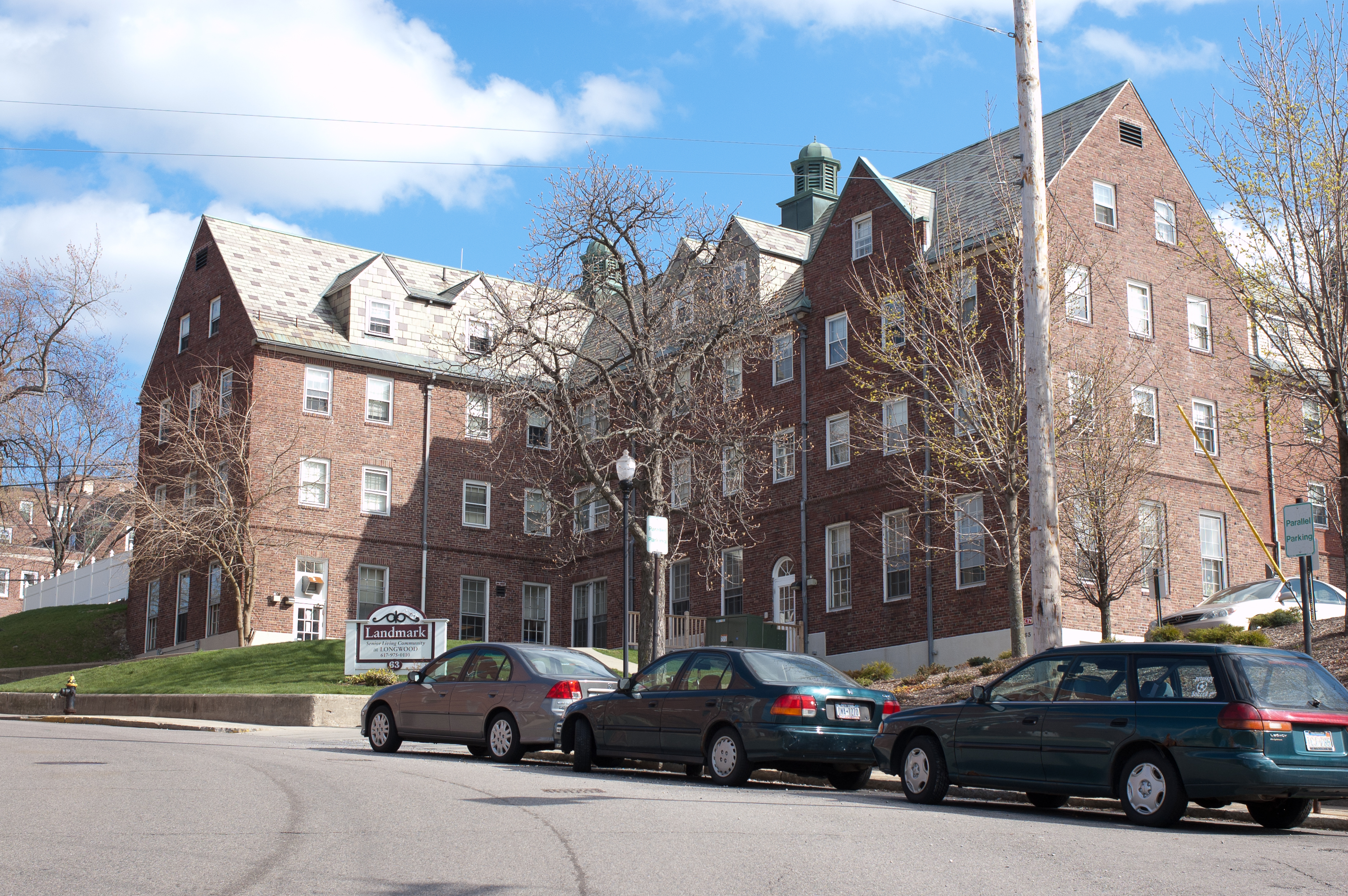

- Location within Massachusetts Location within the United States
- Location: Boston, Massachusetts
- Coordinates: 42°19′49″N 71°6′33″W
- Area: 1.09 acres (0.44 ha)
- Built: 1922
- Architect: Edward Sears Read
- Architectural style: Late 19th And 20th Century Revivals
- NRHP reference No.: 04000085
- Added to NRHP: February 26, 2004

The Edward H. Haskell Home for Nurses, also known as the New England Baptist Hospital Training School For Nurses, is a historic academic complex in the Mission Hill neighborhood of Boston, Massachusetts. Its original building, a 1-1/2 to 2 1/2-story brick-faced wood-frame building, was designed by Edward Sears Read in the Jacobethan style and built in 1922. This building originally housed a dormitory and classrooms. In 1931 a large wing gave the building an L shape, and another series of additions in 1940 gave the complex its present appearance, surrounding a courtyard atop Parker Hill. The complex was converted into an assisted-living facility in 2002.

The property was listed on the National Register of Historic Places in 2004.

== See also ==
- National Register of Historic Places listings in southern Boston, Massachusetts
