= Haskell organ pipe construction =

The Haskell organ pipe construction, sometimes known as "Haskelling" is a method of organ construction used when space does not permit the builder to build a full-length pipe. It consists of a shorter (compared to the full-length pipe) tube nested within another shorter tube. This construction, however, subtly alters the tone of the pipe, causing it to adopt a slightly string-like tone. The minimum height of a 16-foot pipe using this technique is around 10 feet.

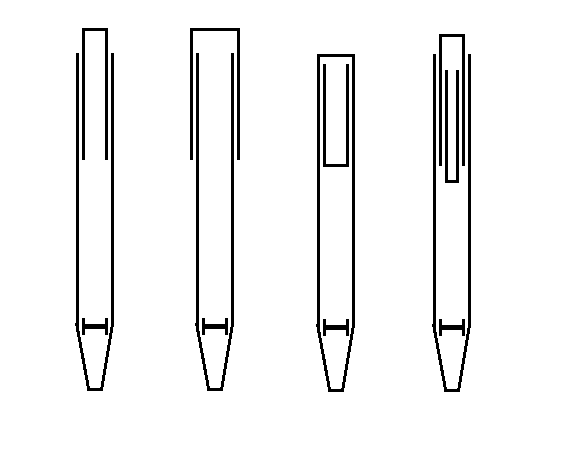
This is a diagram of possible haskelling techniques.

== History ==
This technique was developed and patented by the William E. Haskell in 1910 for Estey, in a series of patents Haskell took out on techniques intended to reduce the length of organ pipes while maintaining their pitch. Haskell created several variations on this design. This technique was especially used in the Estey Minuette organs, which had 2MP pipe organs in what resembled rather large grand or upright piano cases.

== Uses ==
This technique is far more commonly used on flue pipes than reed pipes.
