= Mount Hulth =

Mountain in Graham Land, Antarctica

Mount Hulth (66°41′S 64°11′W) is a peak, 1,470 metres (4,820 ft) high, with precipitous black cliffs on its southeast side, standing at the west side of Cabinet Inlet and south of the mouth of Friederichsen Glacier on the east coast of Graham Land, Antarctica. During 1947 it was charted by the Falkland Islands Dependencies Survey (FIDS) and photographed from the air by the Ronne Antarctic Research Expedition under Finn Ronne. It was named by the FIDS for J.M. Hulth, a Swedish polar bibliographer.
