= Haskel Greenfield =

American archaeologist

Haskel J. Greenfield (born 1953) is an American archaeologist with a Balkan and Mid-East area specialization within a general focus on cultural history.

== Biography ==
Greenfield was born in Newark, New Jersey in 1953. He turned a childhood interest in ancient history and dinosaurs into his profession by getting his doctorate in anthropology from the Graduate Center of the City University of New York (1985) after a B.A. (1975) and an M.A. (1980) from Hunter College. His first professional position was at Indiana University Bloomington, Indiana. In 1989, he began working at the University of Manitoba in Canada.

In 2015 Greenfield was designated a "Distinguished Professor" by the University of Manitoba.

He is married to the archaeologist Tina Jongsma-Greenfield.

== Professional characterization ==
He characterizes himself in this way: "I am an anthropological archaeologist specializing in the evolution of Old World societies, from the beginning of early farming to the development of states and empires.

"Regionally, my research centers on a transect of countries extending from Europe (Serbia, Bosnia, Macedonia, Hungary, Poland and Romania), through the Near East (Israel, Jordan and Turkey), down to South Africa."

== Publications ==
In addition to the 2006 book The Origins of Transhumant Pastoralism in Temperate Southeastern Europe: A Zooarchaeological Perspective from the Central Balkans, he has published over seventy academic articles.
