= Diana Haskell =

American clarinetist

Diana Haskell is an American clarinetist with the St. Louis Symphony Orchestra. She has played with the Savannah Symphony Orchestra, the Charleston Symphony Orchestra, the Buffalo Philharmonic Orchestra, the Milwaukee Symphony Orchestra, St. Louis Symphony Orchestra and the Santa Fe Opera.

Haskell has also taught at SUNY Buffalo, Houghton College, UW Whitewater, Savannah College of Art and Design, Armstrong State College, and Wisconsin Lutheran College and given master classes and clinics at universities in Japan, Europe and the United States.

== Early life and education ==
Born about 1969, Haskell began playing the clarinet, aged 9, when she was encouraged by her grade school band director. She attended Vandercook College secondary school and was a high school camper at Interlochen Summer Arts Camp, where she studied piano and clarinet.

Haskell obtained a Bachelor of Music degree at Eastman School of Music with performer's certificate and a Master of Music degree at the Juilliard School. Haskell also studied at Music Academy of the West.

As a result of being a finalist in the Naumberg International Competition, Haskell performed a solo recital in the Isaac Stern Auditorium at Carnegie Hall.

== Career ==
=== Performance ===
Haskell has previously performed as assistant principal, acting principal or principal clarinet at:

- the Savannah Symphony Orchestra in 1984;
- the Charleston Symphony Orchestra for one season;
- the Buffalo Philharmonic Orchestra in 1988 and 1990;
- the Milwaukee Symphony Orchestra in 1991, 1993 and 1999; and
- the Santa Fe Opera.

She has also been principal clarinet in many summer music festivals, such as Santa Fe Opera, Spoleto Festival of Two Worlds, Colorado Music Festival, Sarasota Music Festival, National Repertory Orchestra, Washington Island Chamber Music Festival, and Lake Placid Sinfonietta.

Haskell was also principal clarinet for the Grammy Award-winning recording of Samuel Barber's Antony and Cleopatra, an opera directed by Gian Carlo Menotti and produced by New World Records.

In 2003, she was invited by Itzhak Perlman to join the St. Louis Symphony Orchestra (SLSO) as assistant principal clarinet. A year later, she was appointed associate principal and E♭ clarinet. Haskell is currently associate principal clarinet with the St. Louis Symphony Orchestra, where she has performed as a soloist numerous times.

=== Teaching ===
Haskell has taught at SUNY Buffalo, Houghton College, UW Whitewater, Savannah College of Art and Design, Armstrong State College, and Wisconsin Lutheran College. She has given master classes and clinics at universities in Japan, Europe and the United States.

For five years, she led a two-week immersion program for advanced conservatory and high school students as part of the MasterWorks Festival.

Haskell is on the board for HEAL Center for the Arts, an after-school arts program in St. Louis for students in urban centers. She is currently the Woodwind Chamber Music Coordinator at Chautauqua Institution School of Music, where she gives individual instruction to conservatory clarinetists and coaches mixed chamber groups. She also participates in the In Unison program with the St. Louis Symphony Orchestra as a performer, instructor and mentor at various locations in St. Louis.

== Recordings ==
Haskell's has released a CD, Clarinet Enchantments (AAM Recordings) that also features George Silfies as pianist and clarinetist, Frances Tietov on the harp, and Peter Henderson on the piano.

== Critical reception ==
Haskell has earned praise from her performances:

- Steven Cohen in The Clarinet Magazine wrote "...Ms. Haskell’s expressive qualities as a soloist are highlighted as she plays with a fluid and moving musical and tonal quality...Each selection [is] performed at the highest level, capturing all the subtleties and stylistic nuances necessary to make Ms. Haskell’s CD a must have";
- while Sarah Bryan Miller in the St. Louis Post-Dispatch remarked: "...Among the highlights was Rossini….this was a part that would challenge even a Marilyn Horne or Cecilia Bartoli. Haskell nailed it with terrific facility, lots of lyricism, and rich tone".
