= Hascall =

Hascall is a surname of English origin. Notable people with the surname include:

- Augustus P. Hascall (1800–1872), American politician, surveyor, lawyer and judge
- Charles C. Hascall (1796–1862), American newspaper publisher and politician
- Milo Smith Hascall (1829–1904), American soldier, banker and real estate executive
- Isaac S. Hascall (1831–1908), American politician, lawyer, and judge from Nebraska
