= List of keyboard percussion manufacturers =

This is a list of keyboard percussion manufacturers.

- Adams Musical Instruments
- Premier Percussion
- Yamaha
- Ludwig-Musser
- Majestic Percussion
- Trixon Drums

== Defunct companies ==
- J. C. Deagan, Inc.
- Leedy Manufacturing Company

== See also ==
- List of drum manufacturers
