= Norman Haskell =

American geophysicist (1905–1970)

Norman Abraham Haskell (1905-1970), was an American geophysicist

Starting his graduate work on measuring the viscosity of the mantle, Haskell made major contributions to geophysics over a career that lasted nearly 40 years.

Other of his contributions included the formulation of a matrix method for propagating waves in a layered medium and development of the simple mathematical description of earthquake sources that allows their durations to be studied using seismic waves. He also used seismology to monitor nuclear testing.

== Family ==
He and his wife, Rose, had a son, Peter (1934-2010), who became an actor.
