= Frank W. Haskell =

Union Army soldier and Medal of Honor recipient (1843–1903)

Sergeant Major Frank W. Haskell
- Born: 1843; Benton, Maine
- Died: October 9, 1903 (aged 59–60); Kalispell, Montana
- Burial place: Pine Grove Cemetery, Waterville, Maine
- Military career
- Allegiance: Union
- Branch: Army
- Rank: 1st Lieutenant
- Unit: 3rd Maine Volunteer Infantry Regiment
- Awards: Medal of Honor

Frank W. Haskell (1843 – October 9, 1903) was a member of the United States Army, who fought for the Union in the American Civil War, and was a Civil War Medal of Honor recipient. He was born in 1843 in Benton, Maine. He entered into the United States Army in Waterville, Maine. Haskell became a Sergeant Major in the 3rd Maine Volunteer Infantry Regiment. Sergeant Major Haskell was awarded the Medal of Honor for heroism on June 1, 1862, at Fair Oaks, Virginia. He is cited to have "assumed command of a portion of the left wing of his regiment," after all other officers had been killed or disabled. He then "led it gallantly across a stream and contributed most effectively to the success of the action." The Medal of Honor was issued to Haskell on December 8, 1898. Haskell died on October 9, 1903, in Kalispell, Montana, and was buried at Pine Grove Cemetery in Waterville, Maine.

== See also ==
- Peninsula Campaign
- Battle of Fair Oaks
- 3rd Maine Volunteer Infantry Regiment
