= Alejandro Viñao =

Argentine composer

Raul Alejandro Viñao (born 4 September 1951) is an Argentine composer based in London.

== Early life ==
Viñao studied musical composition in Buenos Aires with the composer Jacobo Ficher. In 1976 he was awarded a British Council scholarship to study in London at the Royal College of Music and later on at the City University where he was awarded a PhD in composition.

== Career ==
In the 1980s, Viñao worked at IRCAM in Paris where he developed a particular interest in sound interpolation (sound morphing) a technique that has featured in many of his compositions such as Chant D'Ailleurs which won the Prix Ars Electronica in 1992. Viñao has written orchestral and chamber music for the concert hall, opera and music-theatre, film scores, music for multimedia events and rock and popular music. He has also created and presented programmes for BBC Radio 3.

He has written a number of percussion works, such as Khan Variations for solo Marimba, which have become very well known in the US, Europe and Japan.

At the rhythmic level Viñao's work has been influenced by non-western musical traditions as well as by the music of Conlon Nancarrow. In percussion pieces such as Estudios de Fronteras (2004), Viñao used complex polyrhythms to realise with percussion instruments played by human performers ideas derived from Nancarrow's etudes for pianola. He also explored complex ideas on multi temporality using acoustic instruments combined with electroacoustic means, most noticeably in his string quartet Phrase & Fiction (1994/1995).

Viñao presented his views on Nancarrow and his influence on a generation of composer such as himself in a BBC radio programme entitled 'Children of Nancarrow'.

Later work by Viñao's focused on social and political issues, writing music-theatre or concert pieces concerned with themes such as the invasion of Iraq (The Baghdad Monologue, 2005), the fate of deprived children around the world (Chicos del 21, 2010) and the 2008 financial crisis (Greed, 2012).

== Personal life ==
Viñao has been a British citizen since 1994, holding dual nationality. He lives in Crouch End, North London with his wife, American-born actress Lachele Carl. They have a son, Matteo.

== Prizes and awards ==
- 1977 – Cobbett Competition, Royal College of Music, London.
- 1981 – 1st prize at International Competition for Electro-Acoustic Music, Bourges, France.
- 1984 – 1st Prize at The International Rostrum of the Unesco World Music Council.
- 1988 – Triple Concerto -Honorary Mention, Prix Ars Electronica, Austria.
- 1989 – Distinction, Prix Ars Electronica, Austria.
- 1990, 1992 – 2nd prize Sony Radio Academy Awards, UK
- 1992 – Euphonie d'Or, Bourges, France.
- 1992 – 1st Prize Golden Nica, Prix Ars Electronica, Austria.
- 1994 – “Borges y el Espejo”-Honorary Mention, Prix Ars Electronica, Austria.
- 1994 – Guggenheim fellowship in composition, USA.
- 1996 - “Phrase & Fiction”-Honorary Mention, Prix Ars Electronica, Austria.
- 2006 – Leverhulme Trust Artist in Residence at University of Cambridge Computer Laboratory, UK
- 2007 - Roger D. Moore Distinguished Visitor, University of Toronto, Canada

== Recordings ==
- Viñao - Rockwell Records (Catalog no.: RR001
- Chicos del 21+The Baghdad Monologue – ArtZoyd/In-possible Records –
- Son Entero/Triple Concerto – WERGO (WER 2019–50)
- Toccata del Mago – Computer Music Currents 11 – WERGO (WER 20312)
- Hildegard's Dream – Musidisc (MU 244942)
- Percussive Counterpoint, label: CAG records
- Voice Stories – ALBEDO (Catalog no.: ALBCD012)
- United Instruments of Lucilin, FUGA LIBERA, FUG 501
- Vinao, Parmerud etc. "Sthlm Elektronmusikfestival 1981" – Fylkingen Records – FYLP 1026 -
- Miniatures 1 – Cherry Red Records –
- "Khan Variations", Figures in a Landscape
- "Khan Variations" - Boomslang. blue griffin records (B00A80SE14)
- "An Imaginary Orchestrina" - Miniatures - Cherry Red records
- "Water", music by A. Viñao
