= Haskell School (Troy, New York) =

- Formerly listed on the U.S. National Register of Historic Places
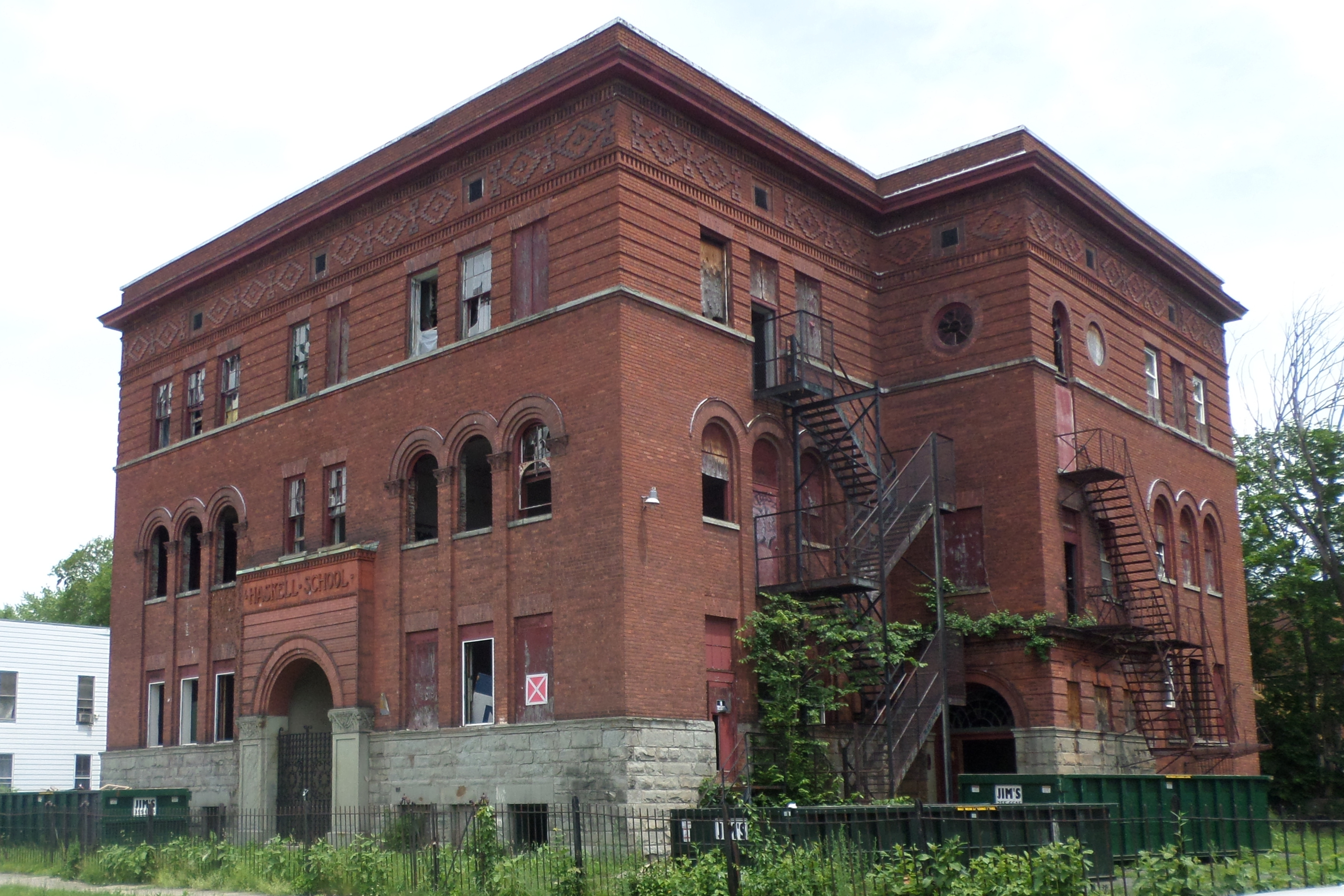

- Location within New York Location within the United States
- Location: 150 Sixth Ave., Troy, New York
- Coordinates: 42°45′28″N 73°40′42″W
- Area: less than one acre
- Built: 1894
- Architect: William H. Demers
- Architectural style: Renaissance
- NRHP reference No.: 03000244

Significant dates
- Added to NRHP: September 19, 2003
- Removed from NRHP: November 15, 2023

The Haskell School was a historic school building located at Troy in Rensselaer County, New York. It was built in 1894 and was a T-shaped, three-story, red brick building on an elevated limestone basement in the Renaissance Revival style. It had a flat roof with a massive metal cornice. It featured a majestic front entrance with a gated arch rising two stories over a tiled vestibule. The arch included the inscription "Haskell School" in a terra cotta frieze. It was used as a school until 1975, then converted to apartments after 1977.

It was listed on the National Register of Historic Places in 2003, and was delisted in 2023.

After being vacant for several decades and several attempts to Redevelop the property, in May 2020 the building was purchased with another plan on converting the building, this time into 20 residential apartments. Located on the east side of 6th Avenue, between 3rd and 4th Streets, it was named for Board of Education President Robert Haskell. It replaced the Fourth Ward School.

However, this redevelopment never went forward, and on August 2, 2023, the building was demolished pursuant to an emergency order by Troy mayor Patrick Madden, citing its poor condition. The listed owner of the building at the time was Save the Haskell of Garden City, Nassau County.
