= William E. Haskell =

American organ builder

William E. Haskell was an American organ-builder and inventor born on November 29, 1865, in Chicago, Illinois. His father, Charles S. Haskell, was also an organ-builder employed by the Roosevelt organ company, located in Philadelphia. At the age of 18, Haskell began working with his father, and around 1901, he established the William E. Haskell Co. of Philadelphia, Pennsylvania. This organ-building firm was later acquired by Estey Organ Co., and Haskell became superintendent of the Estey pipe organ division, which was located in Vermont. He died there on May 13, 1927.

His most famous invention is an organ pipe manufacturing technique known as "Haskelling", where a thinner pipe is placed inside a thicker pipe to create a pipe with a deeper pitch than a normal pipe of the same length. It is used in spaces where it is too small for a full-length pipe to be feasible. It was invented for the Estey organ company, which manufactured many pipe organs, despite its focus on reed organs. He also invented several reedless orchestral imitation stops, such as the clarinet, oboe, and saxophone, whose advantage lay in the fact that they would stay in tune with the other flue stops. This was especially useful for instruments in more remote areas, where a tuner would not be as accessible.

== Patents ==
- Patent #641,509; 16 Jan. 1900; toilet flush valve
- Patent #734,261; 21 Jul. 1903; organ
- Patent #734,262; 21 Jul. 1903; organ
- Patent #760,114; 17 May 1904; pneumatic valve
- Patent #760,115; 17 May 1904; pneumatic coupler
- Patent #795,608; 25 Jul. 1905; pneumatic
- Patent #871,272; 19 Nov. 1907; pipe
- Patent #923,263; 1 Jun. 1909; pneumatic
- Patent #965,897; 2 Aug. 1910; pipe
- Patent #967,911; 23 Aug. 1910; pipe
- Patent #971,502; 27 Sep. 1910; pipe
- Patent #1,078,851; 18 Nov. 1913; coupler
- Patent #1,078,852; 18 Nov. 1913; coupler
- Patent #1,173,507; 29 Feb. 1916; harp stop
- Patent #1,230,895; 26 Jun. 1917; selector for player mechanism
- Patent #1,236,430; 14 Aug. 1917; music player roll
- Patent #1,250,165; 18 Dec. 1917; roll player registration
- Patent #1,281,564; 15 Oct. 1918; swell regulation device
- Patent #1,297,687; 18 Mar. 1919; pneumatic switch
- Patent #1,304,971; 27 May 1919; player action control
- Patent #1,323,530; 2 Dec. 1919; organ
- Patent #1,327,996; 13 Jan. 1920; labial tuba mirabilis
- Patent #1,477,485; 11 Dec. 1923; bottling machine
- Patent #1,659,914; 21 Feb. 1928; stop action
- Patent #1,636,996; 26 Jul. 1927; bottle cap
