= Fulcrum grip =

Type of four-mallet technique

The Fulcrum grip is a four-mallet grip for vibraphone and marimba developed by vibraphonist and educator Ed Saindon. The aim of the grip is to use varying fulcrum positions and finger technique to achieve the control, speed, and power of a two-mallet grip while being able to use all four mallets.

== Description ==
This grip is based on the positioning of the Burton grip, with two mallets being held loosely in each hand. However, while the Burton grip uses mainly wrist and arm motion to create the stroke, the Fulcrum grip uses finger control to manipulate the stroke.

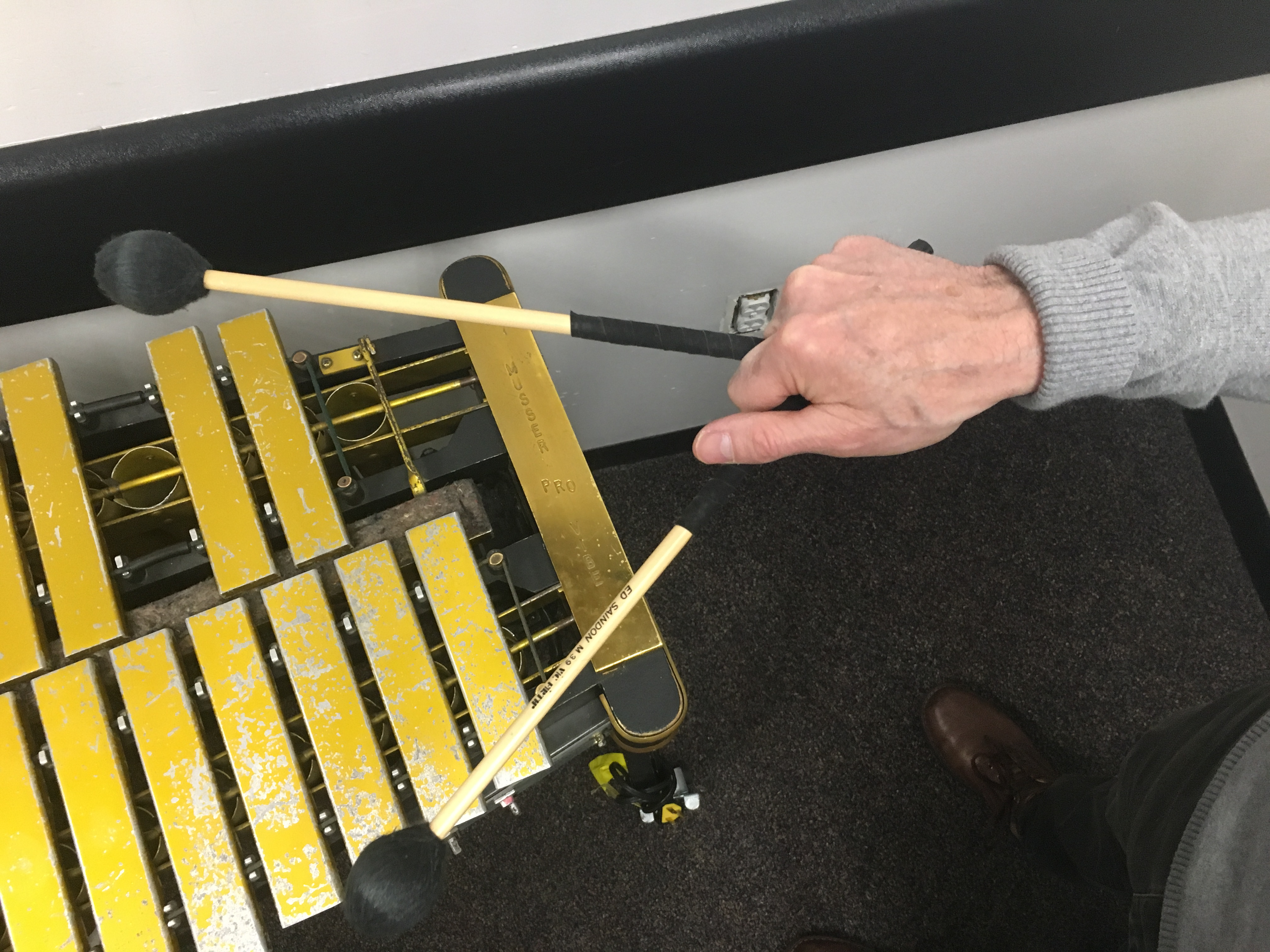
Burton grip

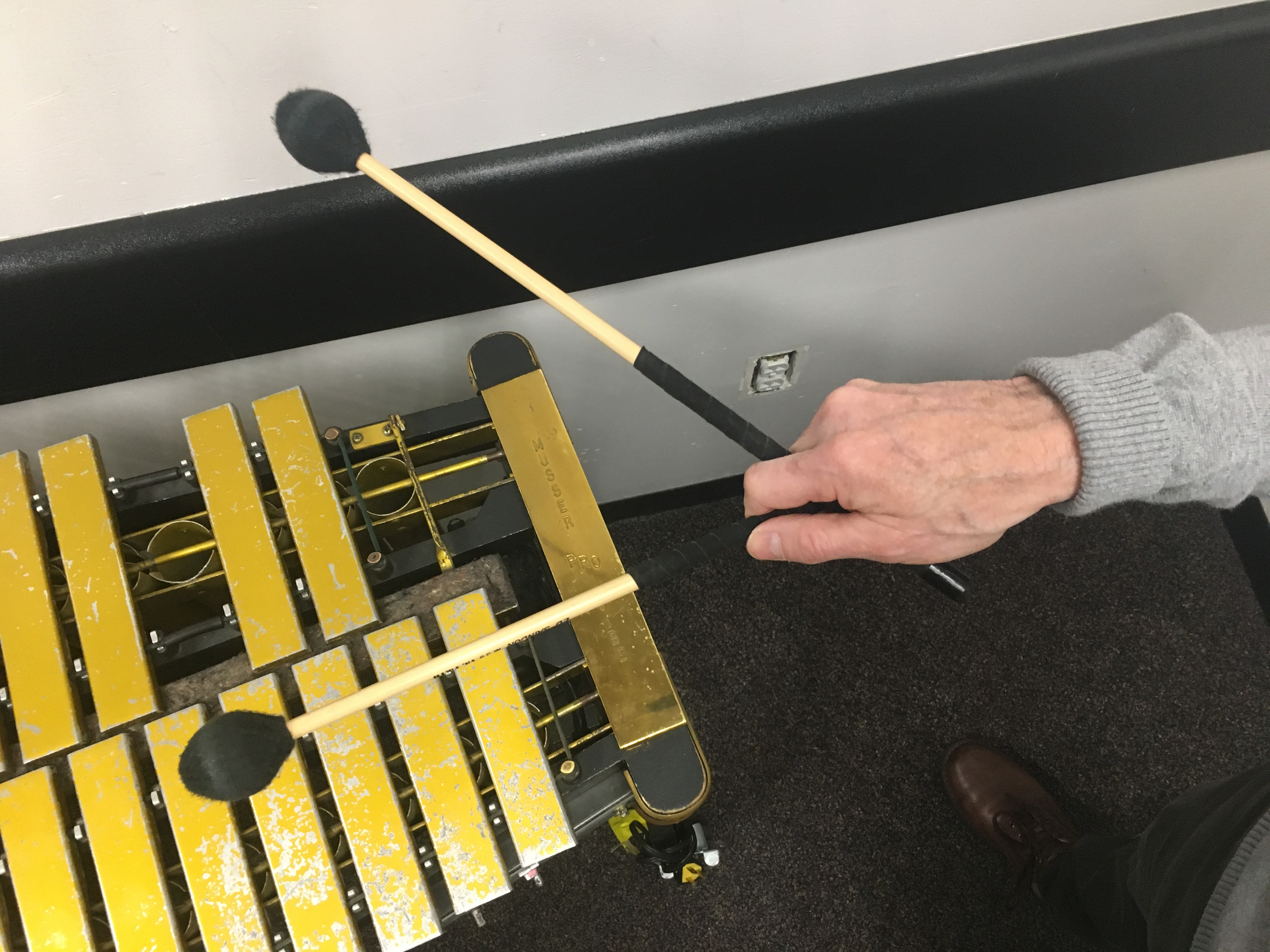
Fulcrum Grip. Note the fulcrum between thumb and index finger, and outside mallet tip out of the hand.

By utilizing a fulcrum between the thumb and index finger, the mallets are allowed to come out of the palm of the hand before they are snapped back in by the fingers, like a two-mallet player or drummer with sticks in matched grip. The result is increased control over dynamic range, speed, power, and efficiency in arm and wrist motion, producing a full sound with minimized mallet stroke height.

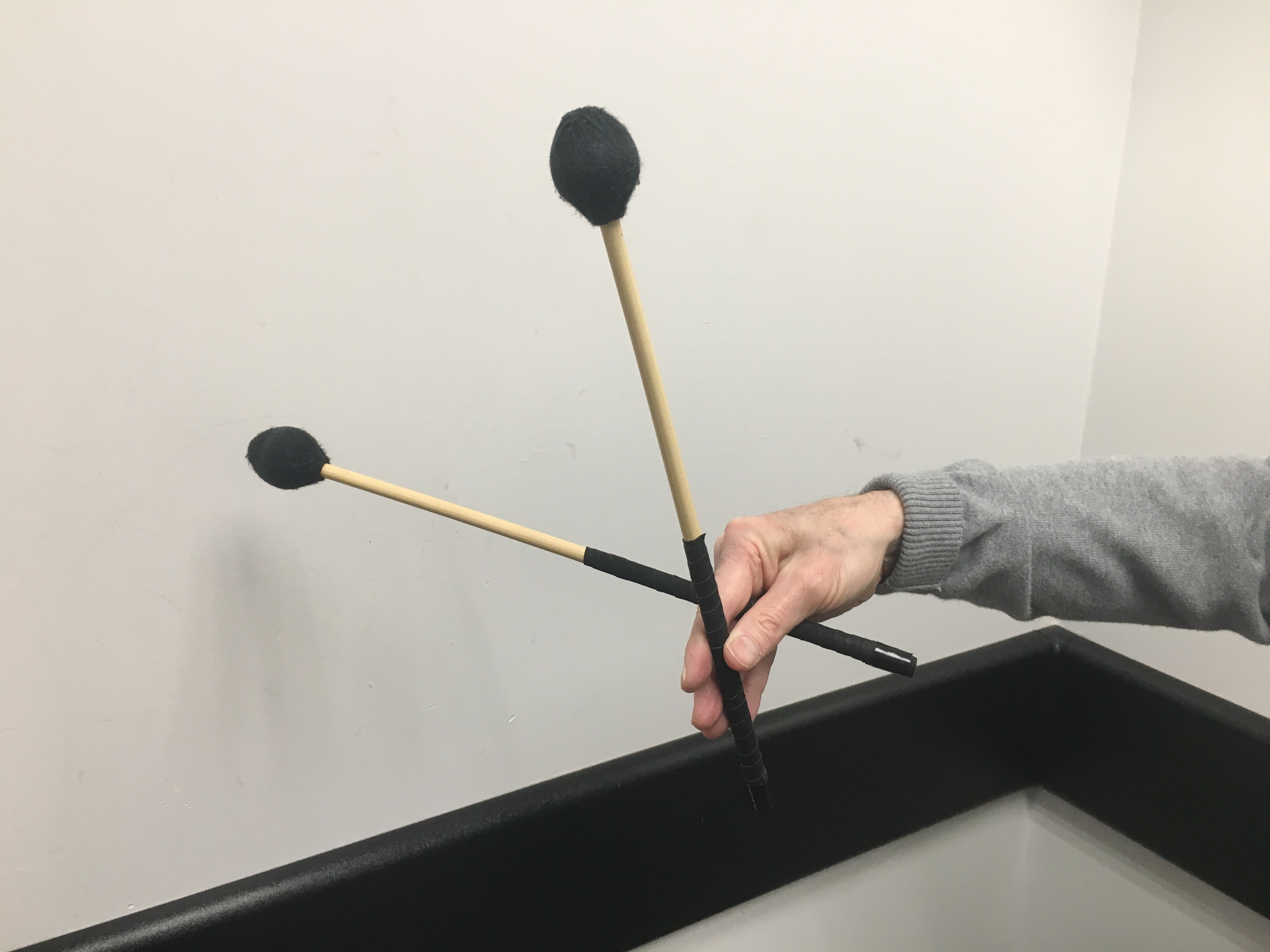
Mallet comes out of the hand to be snapped in by the fingers.

The stroke of each mallet in this grip uses a vertical motion, with the mallet acting as an extension of the forearm. This eliminates the supinated, rotating motion of the forearm used by many four-mallet players which can lead to wrist, elbow, and arm injuries. Because of the looseness of the grip, the mallets are commonly wrapped with tape to increase friction and diameter size. This also helps to reduce clicking sounds between the sticks. Two fulcrum points are used, each relating to a mallet interval spread: "small to mid-range" and "mid-range to large.”

== Small to mid-range spread ==
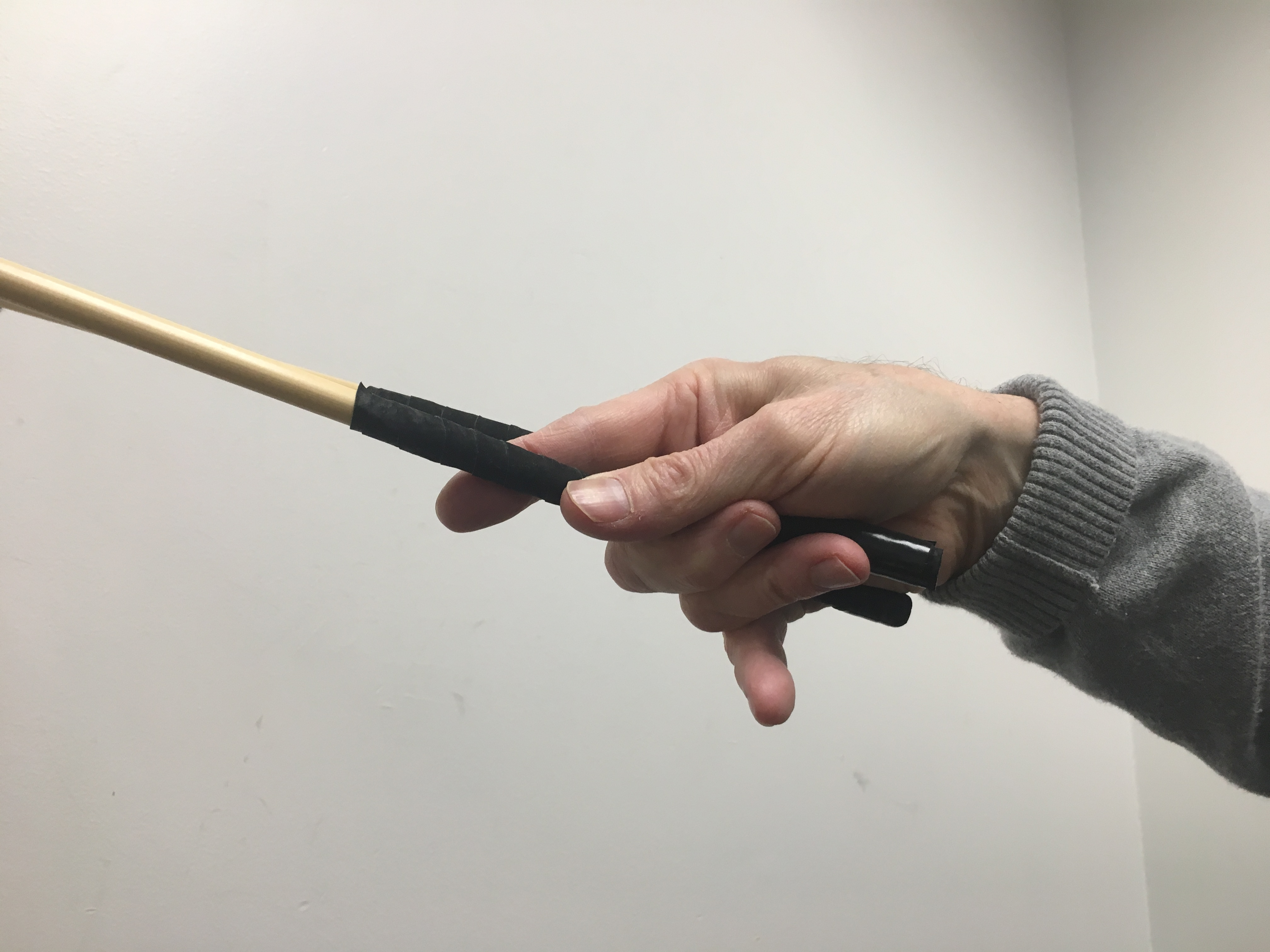
Fulcrum is between thumb and middle finger.

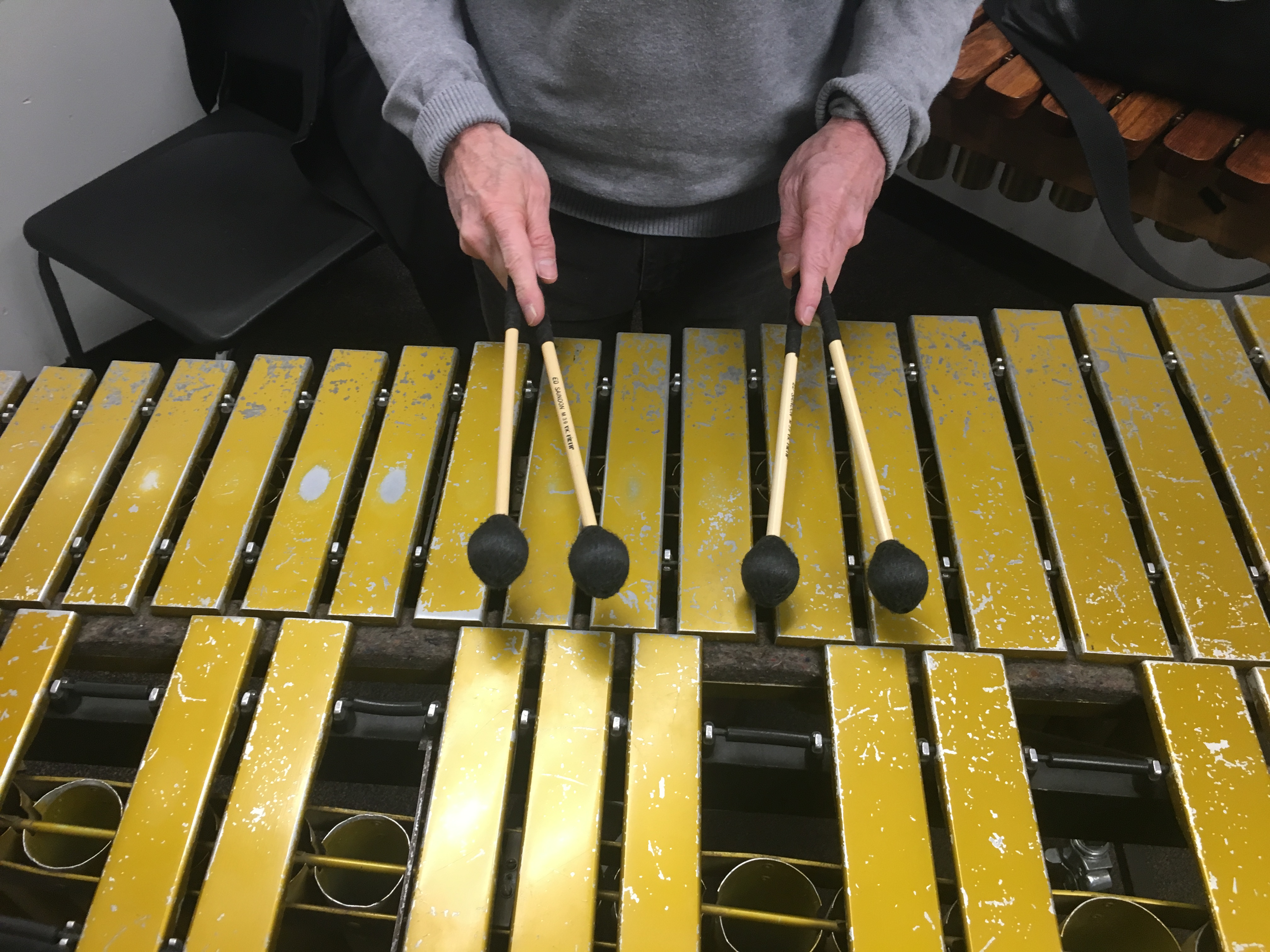
Tight spread

The fulcrum of the small to mid-range spread is located between the third finger and thumb. The tip of the third finger is held to the thumb side of the outside mallet to control the outside mallet and keep it in the palm of the hand. The thumb and second finger are held in a straight position along the inside mallet as it moves in a vertical upward-downward motion. The third finger is used to control the inside mallet as it comes out of the hand and to snap it back in.

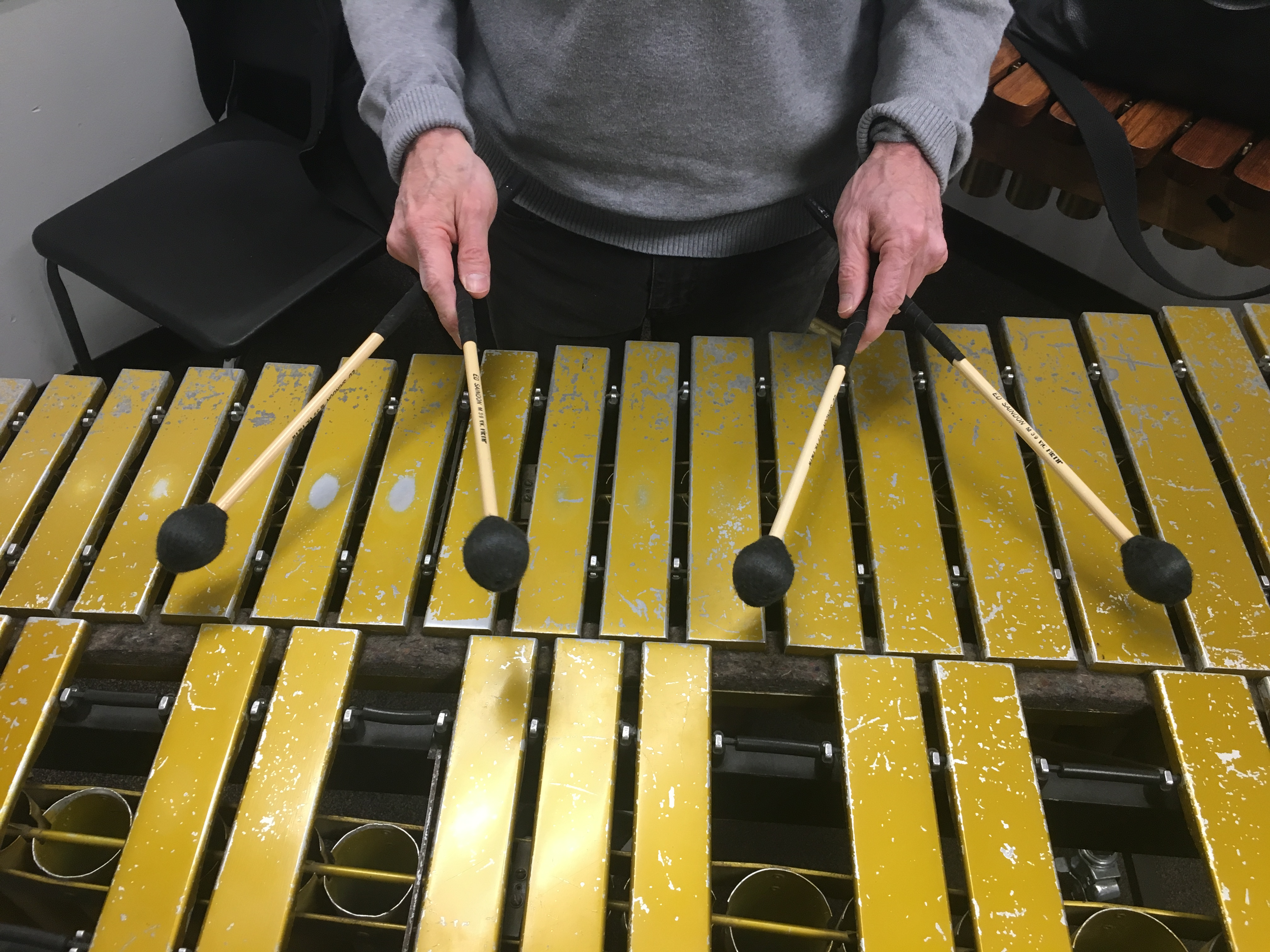
Small to mid-range spread

To control the outside mallet stroke, the third and fourth fingers are used.

Outside mallet is controlled by the third and fourth fingers.

== Mid-range to large spread fulcrum ==
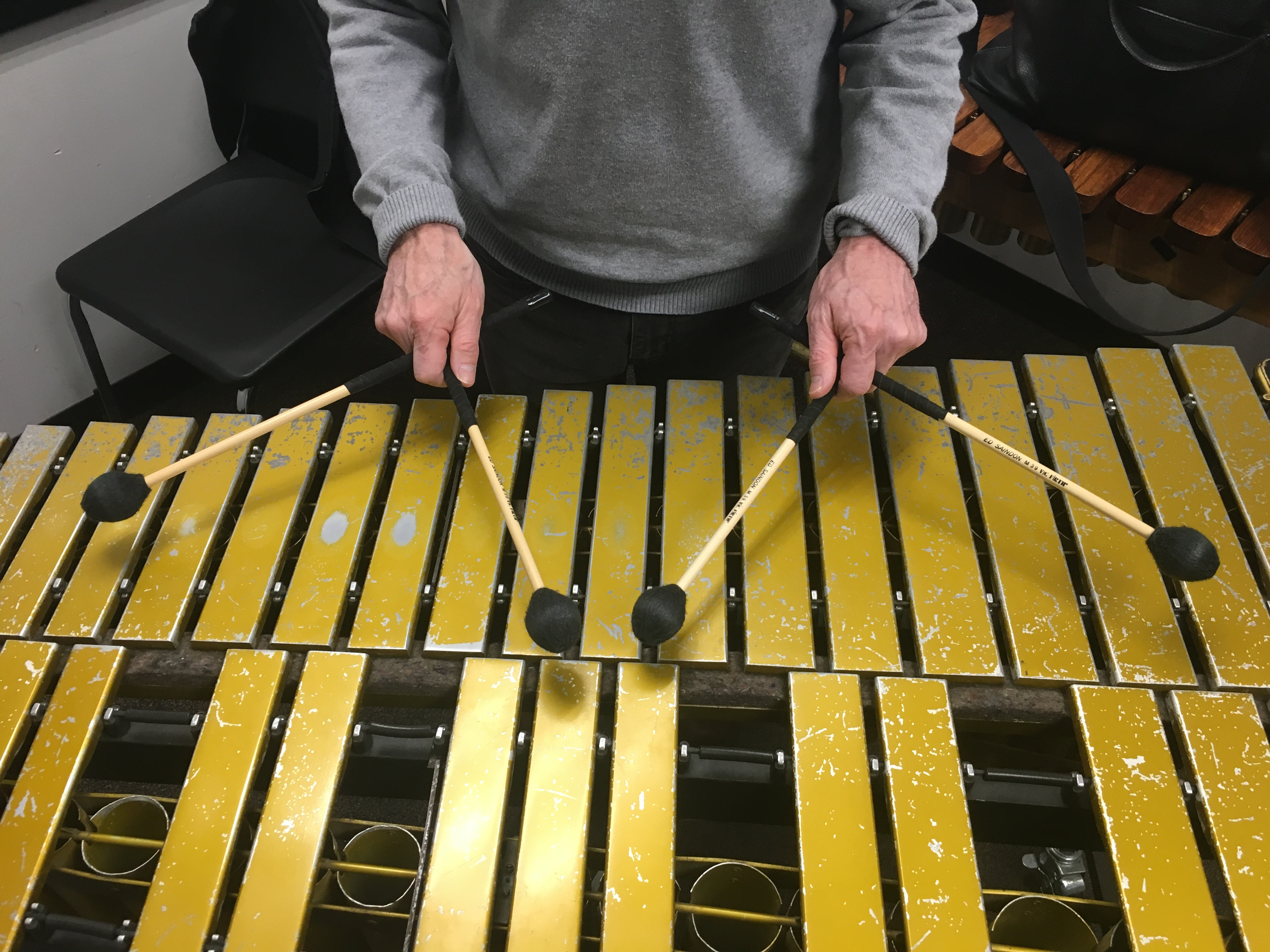
Full Spread

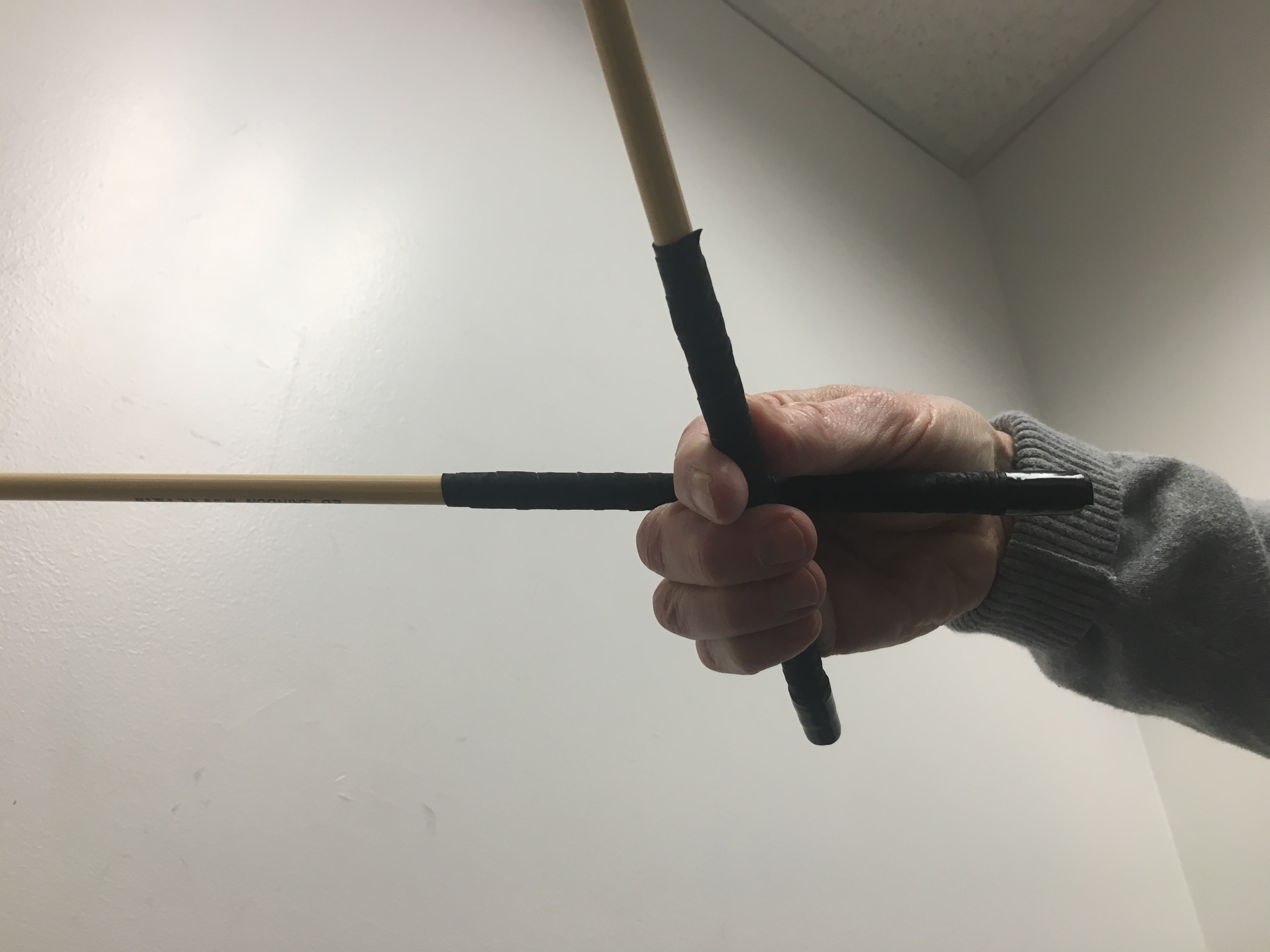
Fulcrum is between the thumb and index finger. Outside mallet tip is out of the hand.

The fulcrum of the mid-range to large spread is located between the thumb and the first joint of the second finger, like matched grip with a drumstick. The tip of the outside mallet is not held by the third finger and comes out of the palm of the hand to form a right angle with the inside mallet, almost perpendicular to the forearm. The third, fourth, and fifth fingers are used to control the inside mallet and snap it back into the palm.

Fulcrum is between the thumb and index finger. Outside mallet tip is out of the hand. Third, fourth, and fifth fingers manipulate the stroke.

The outside mallet is controlled by the third finger in conjunction with a pronated forearm movement.

Outside mallet is controlled by middle (third) finger with pronated movement in the wrist, pivoting along the inside mallet.

== Playing chords ==
This grip facilitates playing high-velocity chord strokes using minimal motion in the wrists and arms. When playing a chord stroke, the mallets will start close to the bars of the vibraphone. They are pulled up using a subtle inward wrist motion and snapped down by the fingers. For a very full-sounding stroke, the mallets are allowed to come all the way out of the hand to reach a right angle perpendicular to the bars and are snapped down by the fingers. In combination with wrist and forearm movement this motion has the potential for a high-velocity, full-sounding chord stroke.

The wrist "flicks" the mallets up so that the fingers can snap them down.

== Power and speed ==
Inside mallets pivot off the outside in the full spread. The fulcrum is between thumb and index finger.

The greatest level of power and speed is achieved by using the inside mallets in the full spread position, with the fulcrum between the thumb and index finger. This method allows maximum stroke height with minimal motion in wrist and arms, similar to two-mallet technique. The outside mallet forms a right angle that the inside mallet pivots off of.

The power afforded to the inner mallets allows the player to use all four mallets when playing melodies, rather than just two leading mallets. This is achieved by smoothly transitioning between the two fulcrum points and various spreads to use each mallet comfortably and efficiently.

== See also ==
- Moeller method
- Burton grip
- Vibraphone
