= Glockenspiel =

Mallet percussion instrument

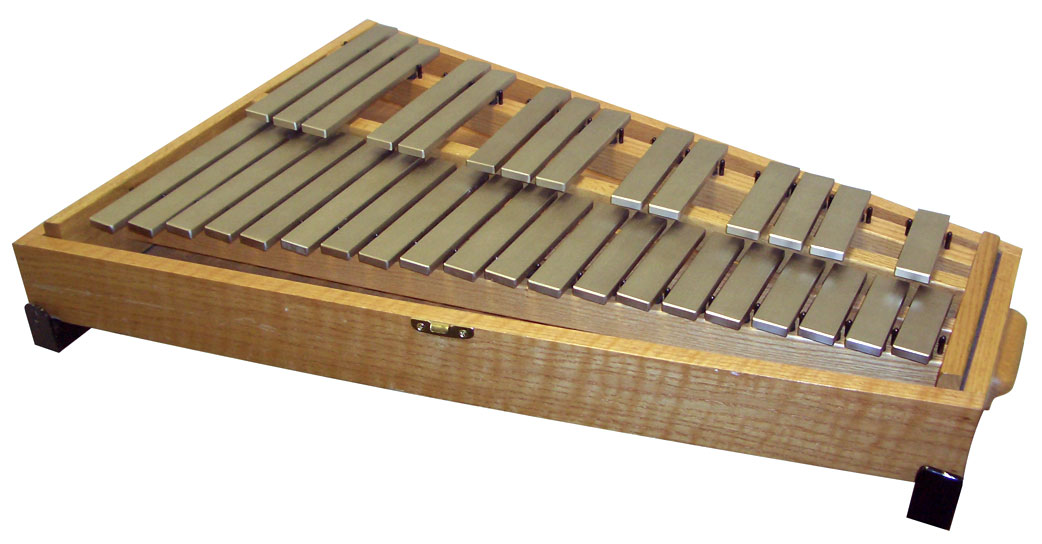
- A glockenspiel made by Malletech

Percussion instrument
- Other names: Concert bells; orchestral bells; carillon
- Classification: Keyboard percussion
- Hornbostel–Sachs classification: 111.222 (Sets of percussion plaques)

Playing range

Related instruments
- Xylophone; song bells; keyboard glockenspiel

Sound of a glockenspiel

The glockenspiel (/ˈɡlɒkənʃpiːl/ GLO-kən-shpeel; German pronunciation: [ˈɡlɔkənˌʃpiːl] or [ˈɡlɔkn̩ˌʃpiːl], Glocken: bells and Spiel: play) or bells is a percussion instrument consisting of pitched aluminum or steel bars arranged in a keyboard layout. This makes the glockenspiel a type of metallophone, similar to the vibraphone.

The glockenspiel is played by striking the bars with mallets, often made of a hard material such as metal or plastic. Its clear, high-pitched tone is often heard in orchestras, wind ensembles, marching bands, and in popular music.

== Terminology ==
In German, a carillon is also called a Glockenspiel, and in French, the glockenspiel is sometimes called a carillon. It may also be called a jeu de timbres (lit. 'set of small bells') in French, although this term may sometimes be specifically reserved for the keyboard glockenspiel. In Italian, the term campanelli (lit. 'little bells') is used.

The glockenspiel is sometimes erroneously referred to as a xylophone. (The xylophone has wooden bars, unlike the glockenspiel which has metal bars.) The Pixiphone, a type of toy glockenspiel, was one such instrument sold as a xylophone.

== Range ==
The glockenspiel is limited to the upper register and typically covers between 2 1/2 and 3 octaves, though certain professional models may reach up to 3 1/2 octaves. The glockenspiel is often a transposing instrument and sounds two octaves above the written pitch, though this is sometimes remedied by using an octave clef.

== History ==
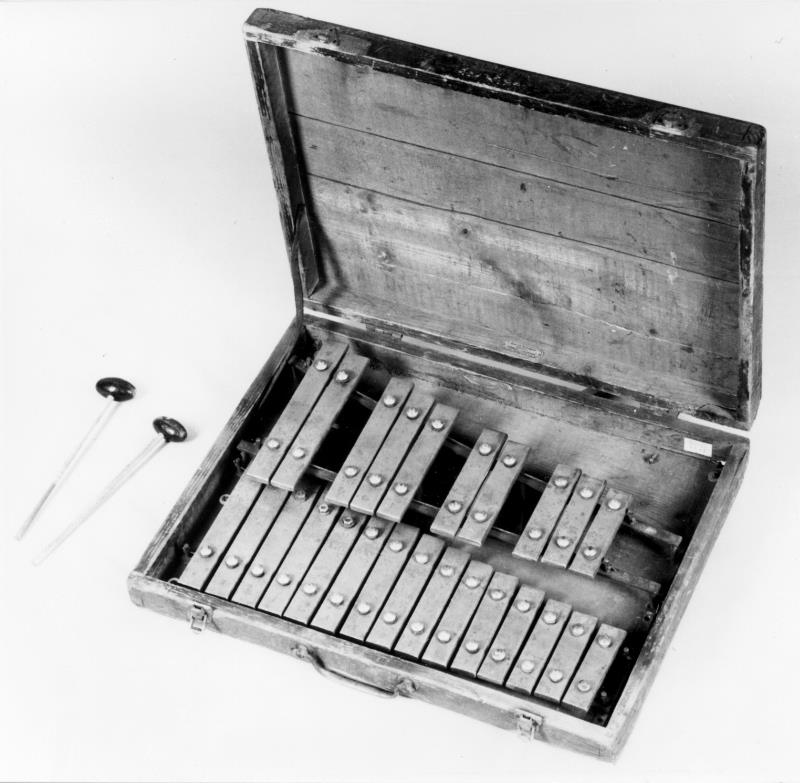
A glockenspiel made around 1910 in Leipzig, Germany

Early glockenspiels were percussion instruments that produced notes via small, tuned bronze bells struck with a drumstick. The bells were replaced by metal sound plates in the 17th century. In the 18th century the instrument was played using a keyboard that struck the bottom of each plate with a hammer. The use of mallets evolved during the 19th century, coinciding with Romanticism.

== Construction ==
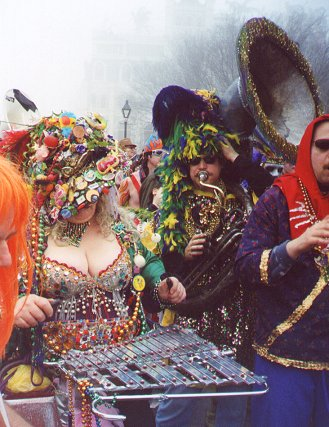
A Mardi Gras musician playing a horizontal bell lyre

When used in a marching or military band, the bars are sometimes mounted in a portable case and held vertically, sometimes in a lyre-shaped frame. However, the bars may be held horizontally, using a harness similar to that found on a marching snare. In orchestral use, the bars are mounted horizontally.

Larger sets of glockenspiel (i.e., sets three octaves or larger) are often equipped with a sustain pedal, not unlike that of a vibraphone.

From 1918 to 1932, J.C. Deagan, Inc. manufactured bells equipped with a resonator under the name Parsifal bells. Both Adams and Yamaha model their professional-grade glockenspiels on the Deagan design.

== Mallets ==
The glockenspiel is played with unwrapped mallets made of hard material, such as metal (usually brass or aluminum) or a type of polymer (usually Lexan, acrylic, phenolic, or nylon). Non-metal mallets are used for general playing, while metal mallets produce a more brilliant sound. Rubber mallets may be used for a warmer sound, although rubber that is too soft may struggle to excite the metal bars. Playing chords on a glockenspiel can be done with four mallets using a grip such as Stevens technique.

== Bell-lyre ==
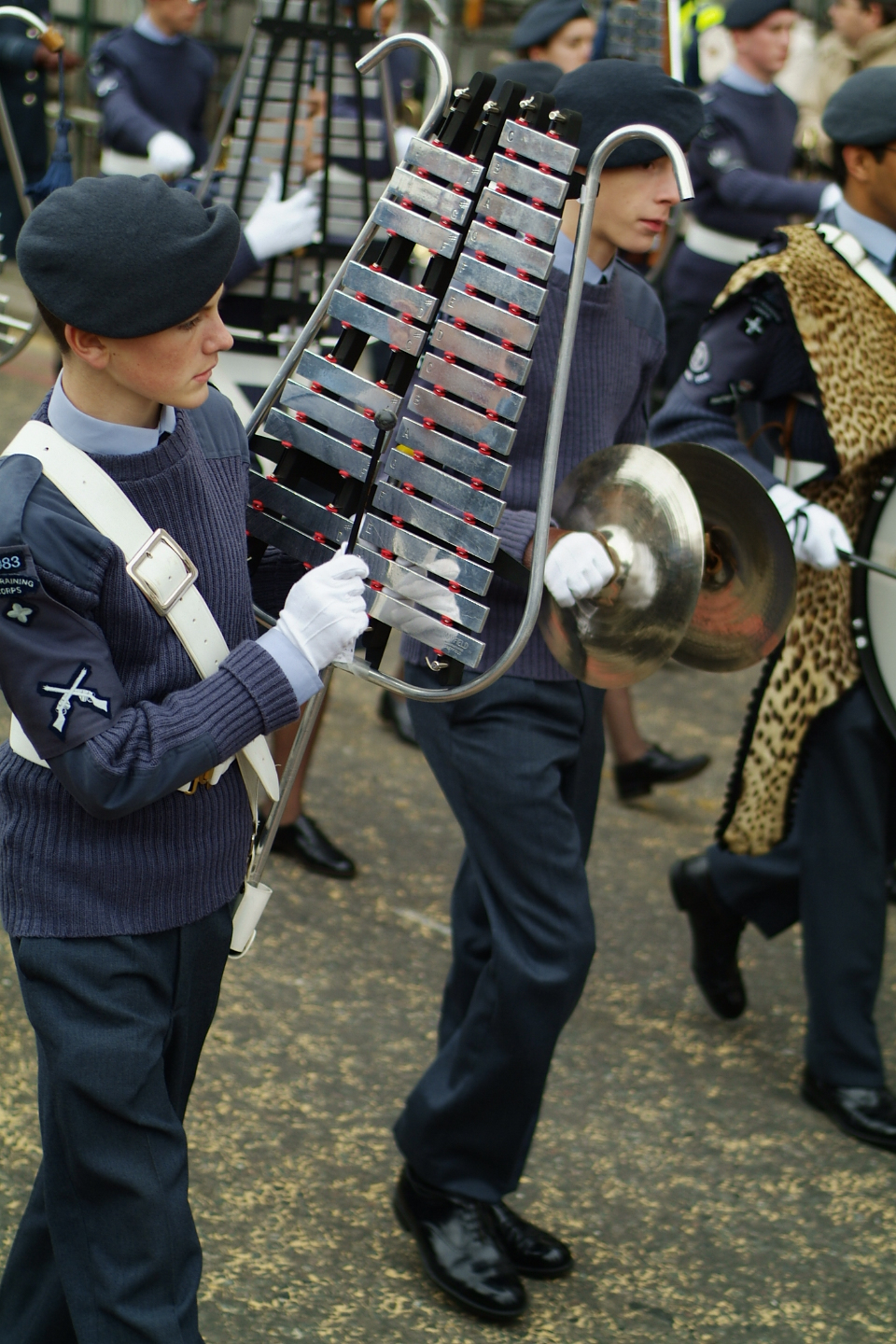
A vertical bell lyre in use by the National Marching Band of the RAF Air Cadets

In the United Kingdom, the United States, and Canada, a form of glockenspiel is called a bell lyre, bell lyra, or lyra-glockenspiel. The bell lyre is a form of glockenspiel commonly used in marching bands.

One variation is played vertically and has an extendable spike that is held on a strap. The player marches with the strap over one's shoulder and plays the instrument upright with a mallet. Another variation of the bell lyre exists that is supported by a strap around the shoulders and back. This variation is played horizontally with two mallets. Since the middle of the 19th century this form has been used in military and civil bands in Germany, where it is called a Stahlspiel or Militär-Glockenspiel.

The all-percussion drum and lyre corps in the Philippines uses this as a main instrument. This form of glockenspiel is also popular in Colombian marching band music.

Many marching bands stopped using bell lyres with the introduction of the front ensemble. One of the few college marching bands with a glockenspiel section is UC Berkeley's University of California Marching Band, where they are affectionately referred to as "glocks".

== See also ==
- Keyboard percussion
