= Vibraphone =

Mallet percussion instrument

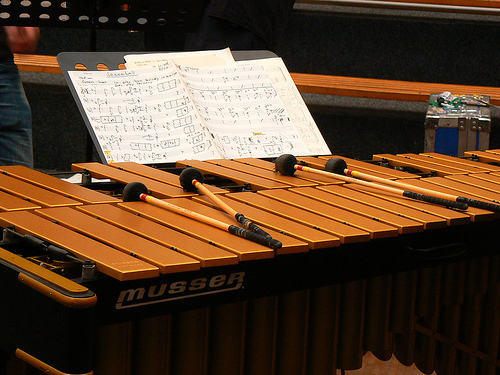
- A Musser vibraphone

Percussion instrument
- Other names: Vibes; vibraharp; vibraceleste; vibratone
- Classification: Keyboard percussion
- Hornbostel–Sachs classification: 111.222 (Sets of percussion plaques)
- Inventor: Herman E. Winterhoff
- Developed: 1916

Playing range

Related instruments
- Steel marimba; song bells; glockenspiel

Musicians
- See list of vibraphonists

Builders
- Musser; Yamaha; Adams Musical Instruments; Saito; Marimba One; Premier Percussion; Majestic Percussion; Bergerault; Dynasty

Vibraphone sound sample
An F major scale played on a vibraphone with the motors on

The vibraphone (also called the vibraharp) is a percussion instrument in the metallophone family. It consists of tuned metal bars and is typically played by using mallets to strike the bars. A person who plays the vibraphone is called a vibraphonist, vibraharpist, or vibist.

The vibraphone resembles the steel marimba, which it superseded. One of the main differences between the vibraphone and other keyboard percussion instruments is that each bar suspends over a resonator tube containing a flat metal disc. These discs are attached together by a common axle and spin when the motor is turned on. This causes the instrument to produce its namesake tremolo or vibrato effect. The vibraphone also has a sustain pedal similar to a piano. When the pedal is up, the bars produce a muted sound; when the pedal is down, the bars sustain for several seconds or until again muted with the pedal.

The vibraphone is commonly used in jazz music, in which it often plays a featured role, and was a defining element of the sound of mid-20th-century "Tiki lounge" exotica, as popularized by Arthur Lyman. It is the second most popular solo keyboard percussion instrument in classical music, after the marimba, and is part of the standard college-level percussion performance education. It is a standard instrument in the modern percussion section for orchestras, concert bands, and in the marching arts (typically as part of the front ensemble).

== History ==
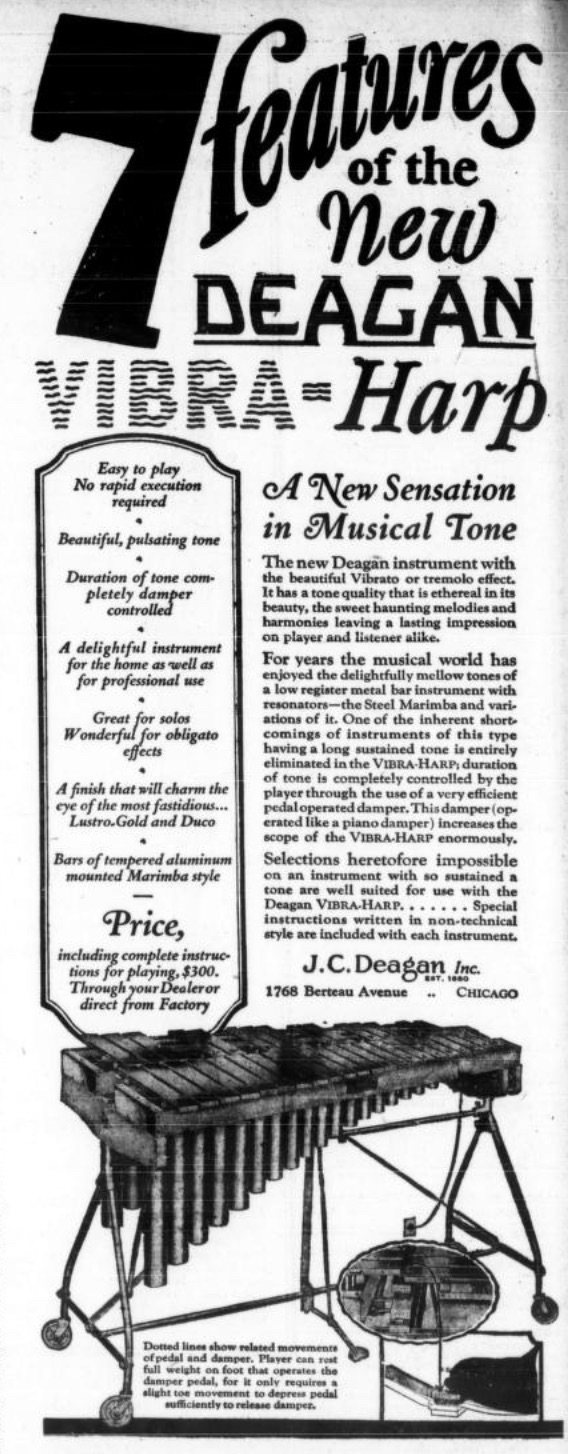
A 1928 ad for the Deagan vibraharp.

=== Invention ===
Around 1916, instrument maker Herman Winterhoff of the Leedy Manufacturing Company began experimenting with vox humana effects on a three-octave (F_{3} to F_{6}) steel marimba. His original design attempted to produce this effect by raising and lowering the resonators, which caused a noticeable vibrato. In 1921, Winterhoff perfected the design by instead attaching a motor that rotated small discs underneath the bars to achieve the same effect. After sales manager George H. Way termed this instrument the "vibraphone", it was marketed by Leedy starting in 1924. The Leedy vibraphone managed to achieve a decent degree of popularity after it was used in the novelty recordings of "Aloha ʻOe" and "Gypsy Love Song" in 1924 by vaudeville performer Louis Frank Chiha.

However, this instrument differed significantly from the instrument now called the "vibraphone". The Leedy vibraphone did not have a pedal mechanism, and it had bars made of steel rather than aluminum. The growing popularity of Leedy's instrument led competitor J. C. Deagan, Inc., the inventor of the original steel marimba on which Leedy's design was based, to ask its chief tuner, Henry Schluter, to develop a similar instrument in 1927. Instead of just copying the Leedy design, Schluter introduced several significant improvements. He made the bars from aluminum instead of steel for a mellower tone, adjusted the dimensions and tuning of the bars to eliminate the dissonant harmonics present in the Leedy design, and introduced a foot-controlled damper bar. Schluter's design became more popular than the Leedy design and has become the template for all instruments now called a "vibraphone".

The term "vibraphone" was trademarked by Leedy and "vibraharp" by Deagan. Other manufacturers were forced to use the generic name "vibes" or devise new trade names such as "vibraceleste" for their instruments incorporating the newer design.

=== Use ===
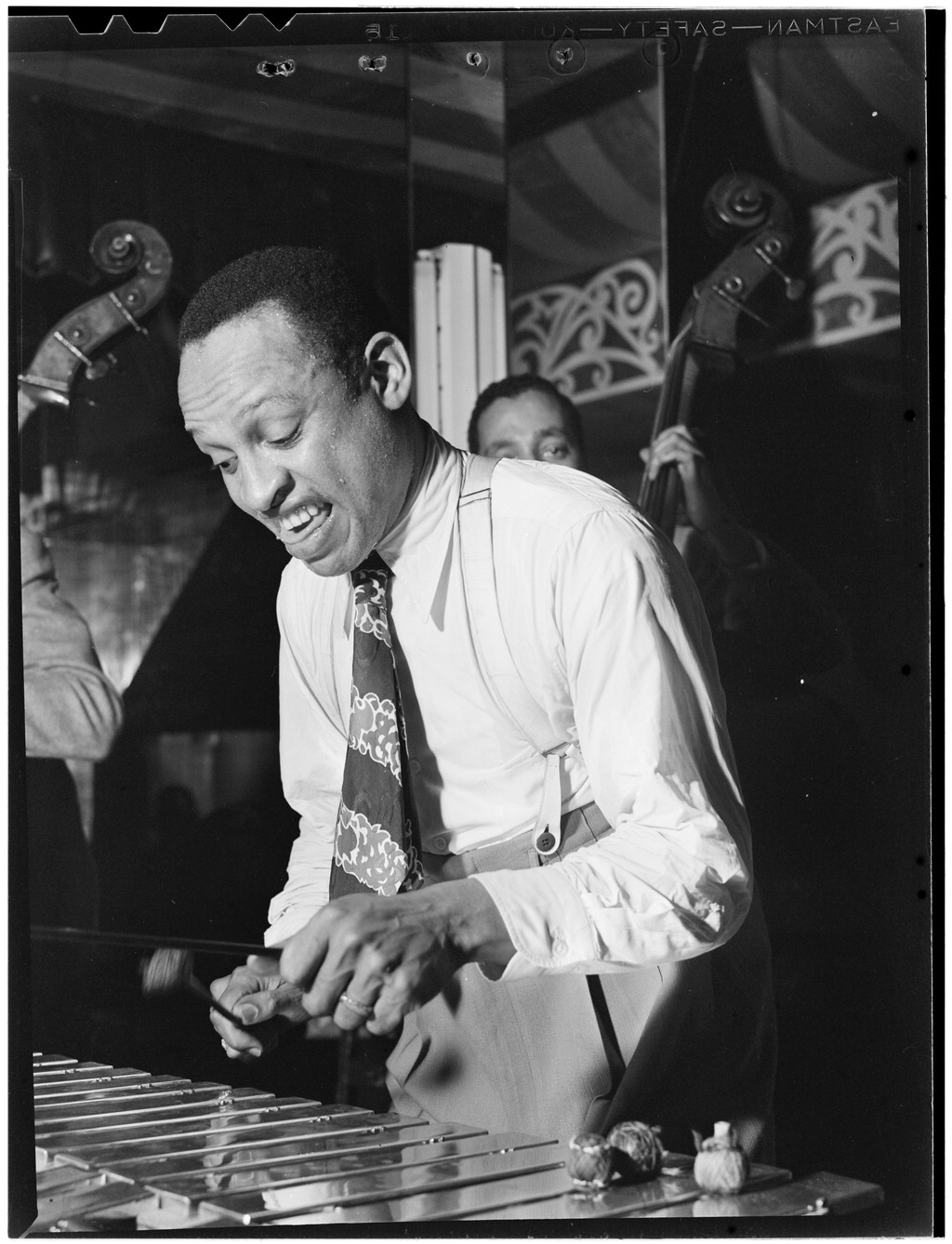
Lionel Hampton playing the vibraphone in 1946.

While the initial purpose of the vibraphone was as a novelty instrument for vaudeville orchestras, that use was quickly overwhelmed in the 1930s by its development in jazz music. The use of the vibraphone in jazz was popularized by Lionel Hampton, a jazz drummer from California. At one recording session with bandleader Louis Armstrong, Hampton was asked to play a vibraphone that had been left behind in the studio. This resulted in the recording of the song "Memories of You" in 1930, containing what is often considered to be the first instance of an improvised vibraphone solo.

In its early history, the vibraphone was often used in classical music to give compositions a jazz influence. The first known composer to use the vibraphone was Havergal Brian in his 1917 opera, The Tigers, which called for two of them. However, since the piece was lost and did not premiere until 1983, Ferde Grofé's Grand Canyon Suite, completed in 1931, is sometimes considered to be the first piece to use a vibraphone instead. Other early classical composers to use the vibraphone were Alban Berg, who used it prominently in his opera Lulu in 1935, and William Grant Still, who used it in his Afro-American Symphony that same year. While the vibraphone has not been used quite as extensively in the realm of classical music as it has with jazz, it can often be heard in theatre or film music, such as in Leonard Bernstein's West Side Story.

== Characteristics ==
=== Range ===
The standard modern instrument has a range of 3 octaves, starting from the F below middle C (F_{3} to F_{6} in scientific pitch notation). Larger 3 1/2 or 4 octave models from the C below middle C are also becoming more common (C_{3} to F_{6} or C_{7}). Unlike its cousin, the glockenspiel, the vibraphone is generally a non-transposing instrument, written at concert pitch.

=== Mallets ===
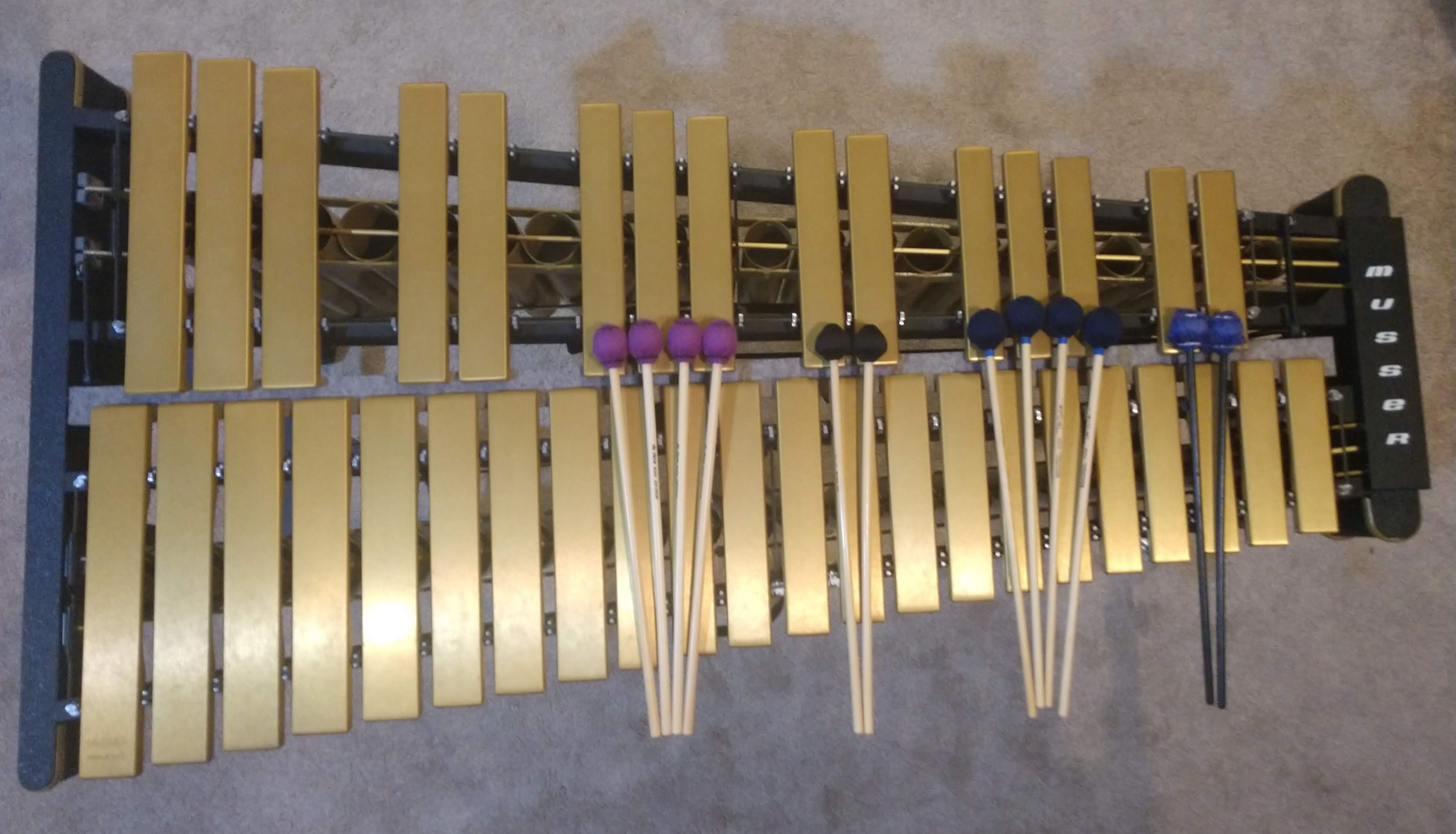
An overhead view of a 3 octave vibraphone with different mallets of varying hardness.

Vibraphone mallets usually consist of a rubber ball core wrapped in yarn or cord and attached to a narrow dowel, most commonly made of rattan or birch and sometimes of fiberglass or nylon. Mallets suitable for the vibraphone are also generally suitable for the marimba.

The mallets can have a great effect on the timbre, ranging from a bright metallic clang to a mellow ring with no obvious initial attack. Consequently, a wide array of mallets is available, offering variations in hardness, head size, weight, shaft length and flexibility.

Classical players must carry a wide range of mallet types to accommodate the changing demands of composers who are looking for particular sounds. Jazz players, on the other hand, often make use of multi-purpose mallets to allow for improvisation.

== Construction ==
=== Bars ===
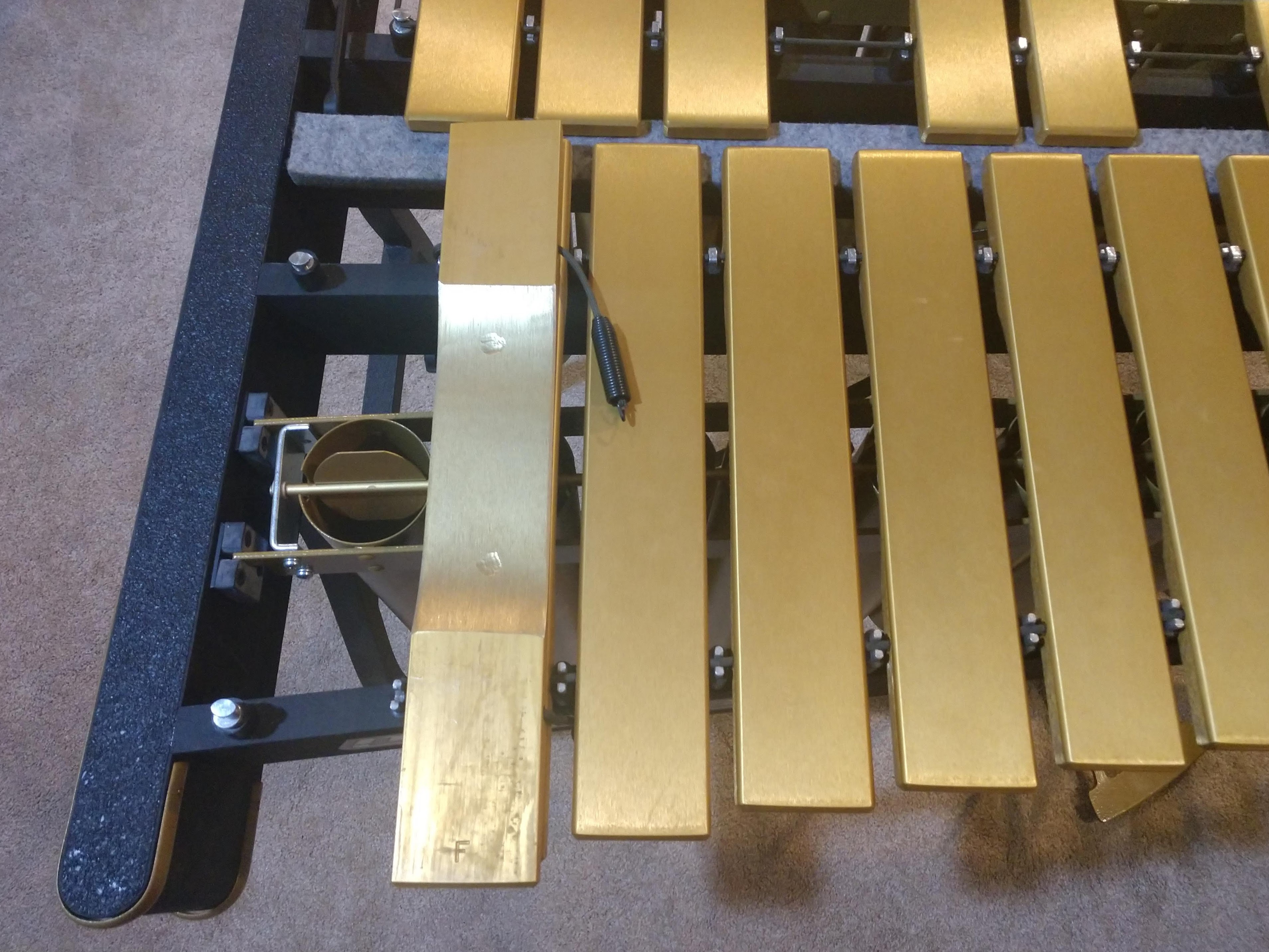
The underside of the low F_{3} bar is exposed, showing the tuning marks, a disc, and the pins and cord used to hold the bar.

Vibraphone bars are made from aluminum bar stock, cut into blanks of predetermined length. Holes are drilled through the width of the bars, so they can be suspended by a cord (typically paracord). To maximize the sustain of the bars, the holes are placed at approximately the nodal points of the bar (i.e., the points of minimum amplitude around which the bar vibrates). For a uniform bar, the nodal points are located 22.4% from each end of the bar.

Material is ground away from the underside of the bars in an arch shape to lower the pitch. This allows the lower-pitched bars to be a manageable length. It is also the key to the mellow sound of the vibraphone (and marimba, which uses the same deep arch) compared with the brighter xylophone, which uses a shallower arch, and the glockenspiel, which has no arch at all. These rectangular bars have three primary modes of vibration. The deep arch causes these modes to align and create a consonant arrangement of intervals: a fundamental pitch, a pitch two octaves above that, and a third pitch an octave and a major third above the second. For the F_{3} bar that usually forms the lowest note on a vibraphone, there would be F_{3} as the fundamental, F_{5} as the first overtone, and A_{6} as the second overtone. As a side effect, the arch causes the nodal points of the fundamental vibration to shift closer towards the ends of the bar.

After beveling or rounding the edges, fine-tuning adjustments are made. If a bar is flat, its overall pitch structure can be raised by removing material from the ends of the bar. Once this slightly sharp bar is created, the secondary and tertiary tones can be lowered by removing material from specific locations of the bar. Vibraphones are tuned to a standard of A = 442 Hz or A = 440 Hz, depending on the manufacturer or the customer's preference. While concert pitch is generally A = 440 Hz, the sharper tuning of A = 442 Hz is used to give the vibraphone a slightly brighter sound to cut through the ensemble.

Like marimbas, professional vibraphones have bars of graduated width. Lower bars are made from wider stock, and higher notes from narrower stock, to help balance volume and tone across the range of the instrument. The bars are anodized after fine-tuning (typically in a silver or gold color) and may have a glossy or matte finish. These are cosmetic features with a negligible effect on the sound.

The bed for the bars is made by laying down four wooden rails onto each end of the frame. Each rail has a series of pins with rubber spacers. As the cord passes through the holes of the bar, they rest on the pins to suspend the bars. On each outer side, the ends of the cord attach together with a spring to provide tension and flex.

=== Resonators ===
Resonators are thin-walled tubes, typically made of aluminum, but any suitably strong material can be used. They are open at one end and closed at the other. Each bar is paired with a resonator whose diameter is slightly wider than the width of the bar and whose length to the closure is one-quarter of the wavelength of the fundamental frequency of the bar. When the bar and resonator are properly in tune with each other, the vibrating air beneath the bar travels down the resonator and is reflected from the closure at the bottom, then returns to the top and is reflected back by the bar, over and over, creating a much stronger standing wave and increasing the amplitude of the fundamental frequency. The resonators, besides raising the upper end of the vibraphone's dynamic range, also affect the overall tone of the vibraphone, since they amplify the fundamental frequency, but not the upper partials.

There is a trade-off between the amplifying effect of the resonators and the length of sustain of a ringing bar. The energy in a ringing bar comes from the initial mallet strike, and that energy can either be used to make the bar ring louder initially, or not as loudly but for a longer period of time. This is not an issue with marimbas and xylophones, where the natural sustain time of the wooden bars is short, but vibraphone bars can ring for many seconds after being struck, and this effect is highly desirable in many circumstances. Therefore, the resonators in a vibraphone are usually tuned slightly off-pitch to create a balance between loudness and sustain.

A unique feature of vibraphone resonators is the shaft of rotating discs, commonly called fans, across the top. When the fans are open, the resonators have full function. When the fans are closed, the resonators are partially occluded, reducing the resonance of the fundamental pitch. A drive belt connects the shafts to an electric motor beneath the playing surface and rotates the fans. This rotation of the fans creates a tremolo effect and a slight vibrato.

Oftentimes, vibraphones, and other mallet instruments, will include non-functional, decorative resonator tubes with no corresponding bar above to make the instrument look more complete.

In 1970, Deagan introduced the ElectraVibe, which dispensed with resonator tubes entirely and took a signal directly from the bars, adding a tremolo in a preamplifier. This sought to improve the portability of the instrument and solve the problem inherent in all tuned mallet instruments: miking the bars evenly.

=== Damper mechanism ===
For the first few years of production, the original Leedy vibraphone did not include a mechanism for damping, or stopping, the sustaining tones. In 1927, the J.C. Deagan company introduced a pedal mechanism that has not changed substantially since. A rigid bar beneath the center of the instrument is pressed upward by an adjustable spring and engages a long felt pad against the sharps and the naturals. A foot pedal lowers the bar and allows notes to ring freely; releasing the pedal engages the damper and stops any vibrating notes. One common flaw of this damping mechanism is that the bar is often supported at one point in the middle, causing it to damp the instrument unevenly in the upper and lower registers. To combat this, some manufacturers have made silicone- or liquid-filled damper pads whose fluid shape can conform evenly around the bars.

=== Motor ===
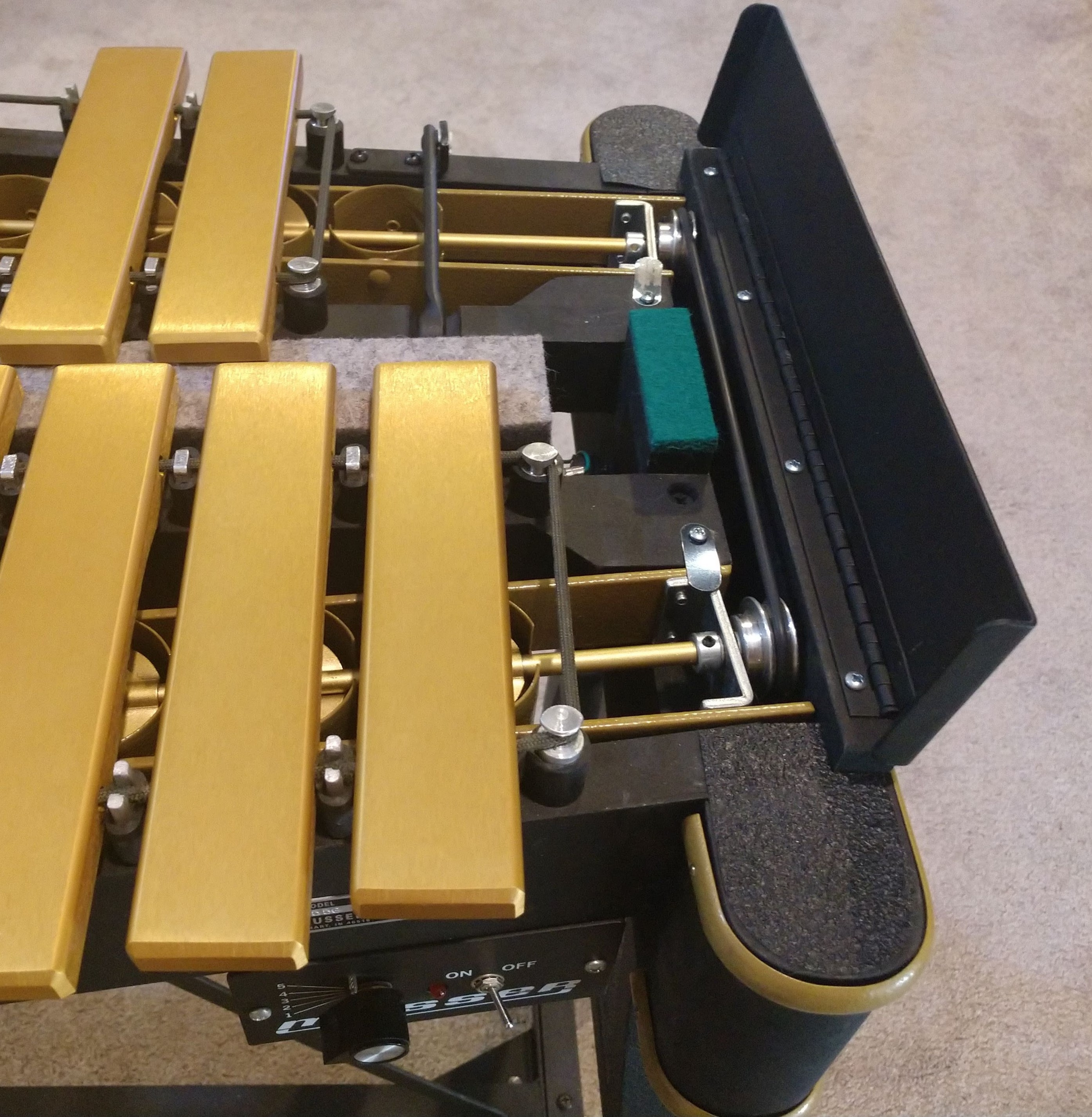
The exposed mechanism of the motor and rubber pulley is shown.

Vibraphones usually have an electric motor and pulley assembly mounted on one side or the other to drive the disks in the resonators. Often, especially within classical music, the vibraphone is played with the motor off. Certain models for outdoor use as part of a front ensemble have the motor removed entirely. In those cases having the motor off is the norm and is not used unless specifically called for.

The early vibraphones used motors that were intended to power record-player turntables and had limited to no speed-adjustment capabilities. Whatever speed adjustments were possible were made by moving the drive belt among a small number of pulleys (usually three) of varying diameters. Later, variable-speed AC motors became available at reasonable prices. These motors allow the adjustment of the rotating speed by a potentiometer mounted on a control panel near the motor. They typically support rotation rates in the range of 1–12 Hz.

== Technique ==
=== Two-mallet style ===
Milt Jackson playing at Parnell's jazz club in Seattle, Washington. Note his characteristic palms-inward two-mallet grip.

The two-mallet approach to vibes is traditionally linear, playing like a horn rather than comping like a guitar or piano. Two-mallet players usually concentrate on playing a single melodic line and rely on other musicians to provide accompaniment. Double stops (two notes played simultaneously) are sometimes used, but mostly as a reinforcement of the main melodic line, similar to the use of double stops in solo violin music. In jazz groups, two-mallet vibraphonists are usually considered part of the "front line" with the horn players, contributing solos of their own but contributing very little in the way of accompaniment to other soloists.

Two-mallet players use several different grips, the most common being a matched grip called German grip, in which the mallets are played palms down, with the thumbs facing each other. In this grip, the mallets are held between the thumb and index finger of each hand, with the remaining three fingers of each hand supporting the shafts. This grip uses a combination of wrist movement and fingertip control to manipulate the mallet. Another popular grip is French grip, a grip also commonly used on timpani. The mallets are again held between the thumb and index fingers and controlled with the remaining three fingers, but the palms are held vertically, with the thumbs pointed upward. Most of the stroke action comes from the fingertip control of the shafts, with the wrists contributing slightly less than they do with the German grip.

Reg Kehoe and his Marimba Queens playing in the early 1940s. Reg Kehoe (center) switches to the vibraphone part way through for a solo using two mallets.

Passages are usually played with alternating sticking, but double strokes (playing two notes in a row with the same hand) are used when convenient to minimize crossing the hands.

The player must pay close attention to the damper pedal to avoid multiple notes ringing unintentionally at the same time. Because the notes ring for a considerable fraction of a second when struck with the damper pad up, and ringing bars do not stop ringing immediately when contacted by the pad, players use a technique called "after pedaling". In this technique, the player presses the damper pedal slightly after striking the bar—shortly enough after so the recently struck note continues to ring, but long enough after so that the previous note stops ringing.

In another damper technique—"half pedaling"—the player depresses the pedal just enough to remove the spring pressure from the bars, but not enough to make the pad lose contact with the bars. This lets the bars ring slightly longer than with the pad fully up and can make a medium-fast passage sound more legato without pedaling every note.

=== Four-mallet style ===
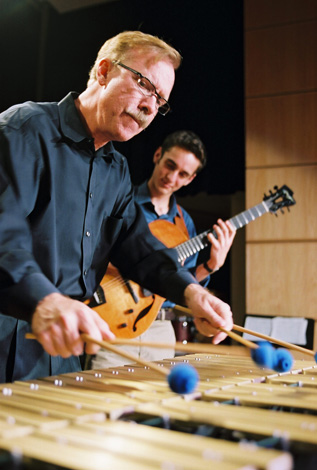
Gary Burton, using his namesake grip, with guitarist Julian Lage.

The four-mallet vibraphone style is multi-linear, like a piano. In jazz groups, four-mallet vibraphonists are often considered part of the rhythm section, typically substituting for piano or guitar and providing accompaniment for other soloists in addition to soloing themselves. Furthermore, the four-mallet style has led to a significant body of unaccompanied solo vibes playing. One notable example is Gary Burton's performance of "Chega de Saudade (No More Blues)" from his Grammy-winning 1971 album, Alone at Last.

The most popular four-mallet grip for vibraphone is the Burton grip, named after Gary Burton. One mallet is held between the thumb and index finger and the other is held between the index and middle fingers. The shafts cross in the middle of the palm and extend past the heel of the hand. For wide intervals, the thumb often moves in between the two mallets, and the inside mallet is held in the crook of the fingers. Unlike many other grips, the outer right mallet is the leading mallet rather than the inside two. Although some early vibes players made use of four mallets, notably Red Norvo, Adrian Rollini, and sometimes Lionel Hampton, the fully pianistic four-mallet approach to jazz on the vibraphone is almost entirely the creation of Burton.

Practitioners of Burton grip tend to make more use of double strokes as compared to two-mallet players. This is done not only to avoid crossing the hands, but also to help minimize the motions between the two bar rows. For example, an ascending E♭ major scale could be played by keeping the left hand on the upper bars and the right hand on the lower. For linear passages with leaps, all four mallets are often used sequentially.

Also popular is the Stevens grip, named after marimbist Leigh Howard Stevens. Many other grips are in use, some variations on the Burton or Stevens, others idiosyncratic creations of individual vibes players.

==== Damping ====
Vibraphone mallet damping
A C major triad is held using the pedal, while an ascending C major scale is played. The notes of the scale are muted by a mallet while the chord continues to ring. The vibraphone is played with the motors off.

Pedaling techniques are at least as important for the four-mallet vibraphonist as for two-mallet players, but the all-or-nothing damping system of the sustain pedal presents many obstacles to multi-linear playing, since each line normally has its own damping requirements independent of the other lines. To overcome this, four-mallet players also use "mallet damping" and "hand damping". There are many benefits of being proficient in these techniques, as it allows the player to transition between chords much more smoothly and play new notes without having them affect the quality of the chord when the pedal is down.

The most common form of mallet damping occurs when the vibraphonist plays a note with one mallet before pressing another mallet into the ringing bar to stop it from sounding. Usually the damping mallet and the original striking mallet are held in different hands, but advanced players can, in some circumstances, use the same hand. Mallet damping also includes "dead strokes", where a player strikes a bar and then, instead of drawing the mallet back, directly presses the head of the mallet onto the bar, causing the ringing to stop immediately. This produces a fairly distinctive "choked" sound, and dead strokes are often used just for that particular sound in addition to the damping aspects.

Hand damping (also known as "finger damping") can be used to damp a note on the lower bars while striking a nearby upper bar. As the player strikes the upper bar with a mallet, they simultaneously press the heel of their hand or the side of their finger into the ringing lower bar, using the same hand to strike the upper bar and damp the lower one. Using both hands, it's possible to damp and strike two bars at once.

=== Extended techniques ===
==== Five to six mallets ====
To achieve a denser sound and richer chord voicings, some vibraphonists have experimented with three mallets per hand, either in both hands for a total of six mallets or in just the left hand for a total of five.

==== Bowing ====
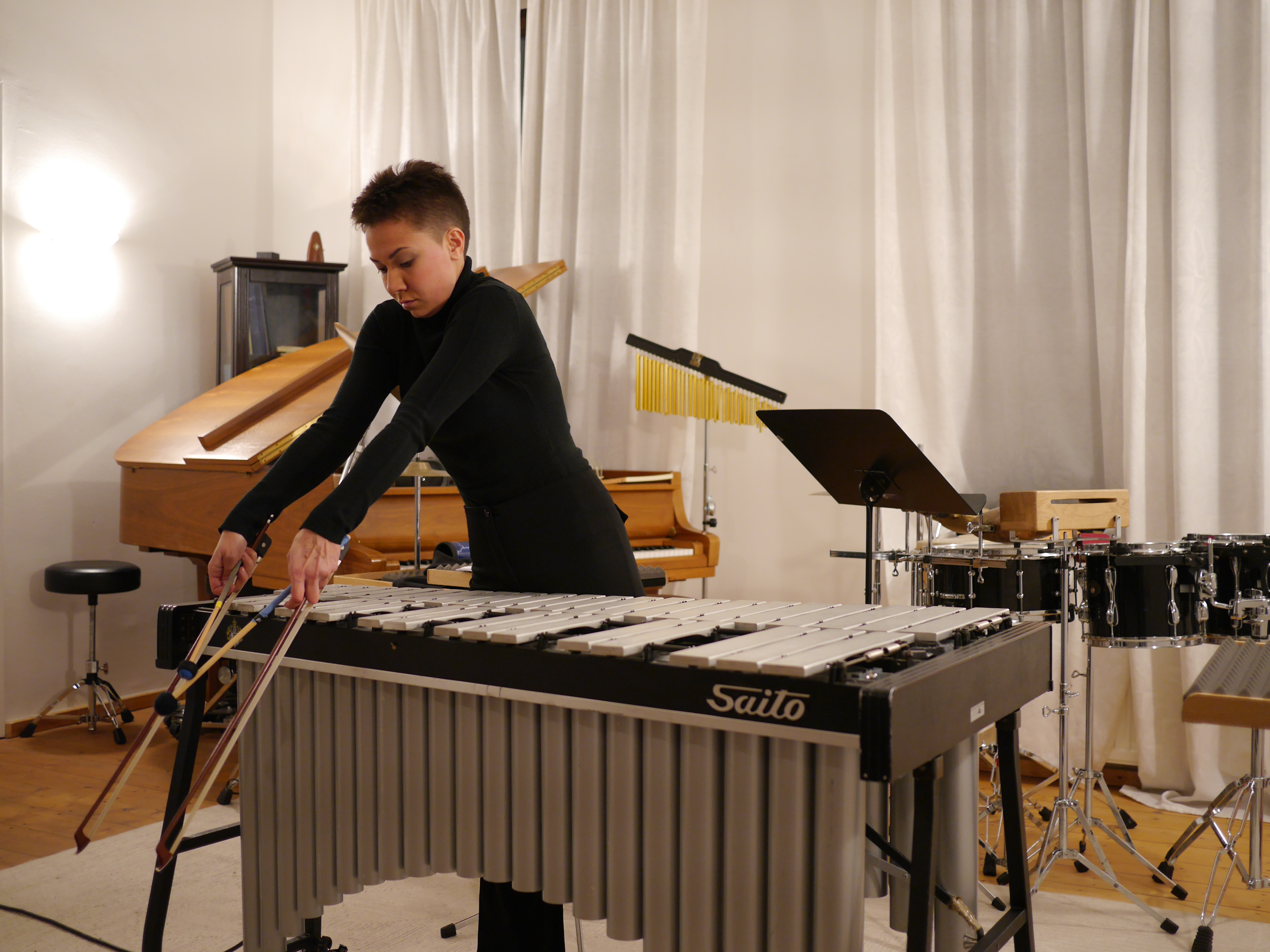
A vibraphonist using two double bass bows to play "Mourning Dove Sonnet" by Christopher Deane.

Like many other metallophones, percussionists can use an orchestral bow on the vibraphone to achieve sustained tones that will not decay, nor have a percussive attack. This is done by bowing the bars perpendicular to their outer edges. Due to the different mode of vibration, this also changes the sound of the vibraphone by emphasizing the higher harmonics and giving it a more "glassy" tone. Because changing notes requires large and precise movements, fast passages are not often written for bowed vibraphone.

==== Pitch bend ====
Bent notes can be achieved on the vibraphone by sliding a rubber or plastic mallet from the nodal point to the center of the bar. This technique is able to lower the pitch by about a half step.

== Repertoire ==
=== Classical ===
As part of the standard percussion section, the use of the vibraphone in classical music has increased over the past fifty years, especially within the collegiate percussion ensemble.

==== Concertos ====
Several concertos have been written for the vibraphone, the first of these being Darius Milhaud's Concerto for Marimba, Vibraphone and Orchestra written in 1947. Other prominent concertos for the vibraphone include Ney Rosauro's Concerto No. 1 for Vibraphone written in 1996 and Emmanuel Séjourné's Concerto for Vibraphone and Strings written in 1999.

==== Solos ====
The vibraphone is the second most popular solo keyboard percussion instrument, after the marimba. Solos may be jazz standards specifically arranged for the instrument or newly composed pieces that are either jazz-oriented or classical in nature. Some of the most performed solo literature includes Mirror from Another by David Friedman, "Mourning Dove Sonnet" by Christopher Deane, Trilogy by Tim Huesgen, and "Blues for Gilbert" by Mark Glentworth.

== Manufacturers ==
Throughout the 1930s and 1940s, each manufacturer attracted its own following in various specialties, but the Deagan vibraphones were the models preferred by many of the specialist jazz players. Deagan struck endorsement deals with many of the leading players, including Lionel Hampton and Milt Jackson. However, the Deagan company went out of business in the 1980s, and its trademark and patents were purchased by Yamaha. Yamaha continues to make percussion instruments based on the Deagan designs.

In 1948, the Musser Mallet Company was founded by Clair Omar Musser, who had been a designer at Deagan. The Musser Mallet Company continues to manufacture vibraphones as part of the Ludwig Drum Company after their purchase in 1965. The Leedy Manufacturing Company, the original designers of the vibraphone, had already merged with Ludwig Drums in 1929 under C. G. Conn.

== Bibliography ==
- Blades, James (1992). Percussion Instruments and Their History (Rev. ed.). Westport, CT: Bold Strummer. ISBN 978-0-933224-71-1. OCLC 28230162.
- Rossing, Thomas D. (2000). Science of Percussion Instruments. Singapore: World Scientific. ISBN 978-981-02-4158-2. OCLC 45679450.
- Beck, John H. (2007). Encyclopedia of Percussion (2nd ed.). New York, NY: Routledge. ISBN 978-0-415-97123-2. OCLC 0415971233.
