= John Serry =

John Serry may refer to:

- John Serry (1915–2003), Italian-American concert accordionist, organist, composer, educator
- John Serry Jr. (born 1954), his son, Italian-American jazz pianist, composer
