= Fulcrum =

A fulcrum (pl.: fulcra or fulcrums) is the support about which a lever pivots.

Fulcrum may also refer to:

== Companies and organizations ==
- Fulcrum (Anglican think tank), a Church of England think tank
- Fulcrum Press, a British publisher of poetry
- Fulcrum Wheels, a bicycle wheel manufacturer in Italy

== Entertainment ==
- Fulcrum (annual), a United States literary periodical
- Fulcrum (Chuck), the enemy spy organization on the TV series Chuck
- Fulcrum (newspaper), a student newspaper at the University of Ottawa
- Fulcrum (sculpture), a 1987 sculpture in London by Richard Serra
- The Fulcrum (comics), a supreme being in the Marvel Comics universe
- Ahsoka Tano, a character in the animated series Star Wars Rebels who uses the alias Fulcrum
  - Agent Alexsandr Kallus, a character from the same series who took the alias Fulcrum after Ahsoka Tano.

== Other ==
- Fulcrum (Antarctica), a geological formation in Antarctica
- Fulcrum (drumming), part of a percussionist's grip
- Fulcrum weeder, a garden tool
- Mikoyan MiG-29, NATO reporting name "Fulcrum", a Soviet fighter aircraft
- Operation Fulcrum, a series of United States nuclear weapons tests in 1976-1977
