= John H. Beck =

American percussionist and professor

John H. Beck (born February 16, 1933) is professor emeritus of percussion at the Eastman School of Music and was principal timpanist for the Rochester Philharmonic Orchestra from 1962 to 2002.

== Career ==
Beck was born on February 16, 1933, in Lewisburg, Pennsylvania. Beck found a passion for music playing drum set in the local bars around town. Aiming to be a jazz drummer in the footstep of artists like Gene Krupa, Beck began studying at Eastman under William Street in 1951. After earning his bachelor's degree in 1955, Beck served in the United States Marines as a timpanist for The President's Own. After his discharge in 1959, he taught for Eastman's preparatory program and later became the full professor of percussion in 1967, after Street's retirement. Notable students of Beck include drummer Steve Gadd, vibraphonist Joe Locke, and marimbist Leigh Howard Stevens.

Beck served as the president for the New York chapter of the Percussive Arts Society starting in 1976, later being elected the organization's vice president in 1982 and serving as its president from 1987 to 1990. With Beck as the host, the organization had the first annual Percussive Arts Society International Convention (PASIC) at Eastman in 1976.

Alongside his role as a teacher and performer, Beck has authored articles for the Grove Dictionary of American Music, World Book Encyclopedia, and The Instrumentalist, among others. Beck also edited the Encyclopedia of Percussion which is considered the standard reference book for the subject. In 2011, he released an autobiography titled Percussion Matters: Life at the Eastman School of Music.
