= Burton grip =

Type of four-mallet technique

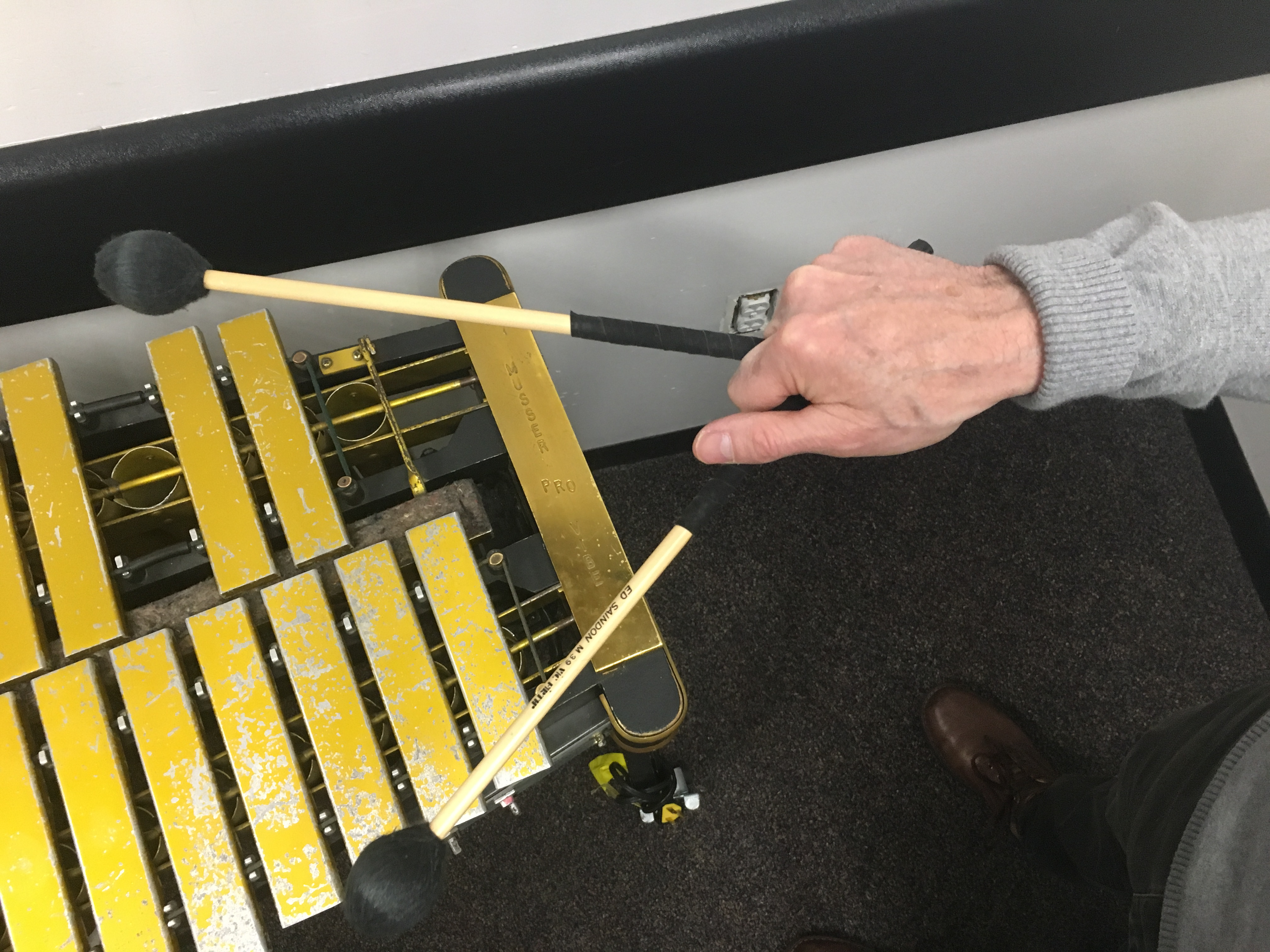
Burton grip

The Burton grip is a method of holding two mallets in each hand in order to play a mallet percussion instrument, such as a marimba or a vibraphone, using four mallets at once. It was developed by jazz vibraphonist Gary Burton around the 1960s.

The grip was designed to make up for Burton's perceived shortcomings of the traditional grip, which he thought could be difficult to control while changing intervals. Burton grip was also designed so that a player could play two-mallet lines and melodies without having to put down two mallets. Gary Burton had observed that jazz vibraphonists would tend to play harmony using four mallets, but switch to a two mallet grip to solo, so he made the Burton grip so that one could solo without having to switch grips, allowing for chords to be used during these solos.

It is formed as a variant of the cross grip, with the mallets held as follows:

Seen with the palm facing upwards, the inside mallet is placed and crossed over the outside mallet. The end of the inside mallet is held with the little finger, and outside mallet is held between the index and middle fingers. The thumb is generally placed inside the inside mallet, but it sometimes is placed between the mallets to widen the interval. When resting, the inner mallet should sit like a drumstick held by the thumb and index finger while lightly rapped around with fingers 3,4, and 5. This inner mallet, typically used for melodies, can move independently when gripped with the index finger and thumb and pivoted over the outer mallet. When necessary, the outer mallet can be separately articulated by widening the interval so the mallets come as close to a right angle as possible and giving a swift downward flick with the wrist and middle and index fingers.

Although results may vary from player to player, the advantage to the Burton grip is stability, where holding a specific interval steady is typically more comfortable than in other grips. Playing two-mallet lines is another strength of the grip, as one can play the lines using any combination of mallets (although melodies are typically played with the 2 and 4 mallets) with relative comfort and control.

== See also ==
- Fulcrum grip
- Four Hammer Dulcimer
- Stevens grip
