= Song bells =

Type of metallophone

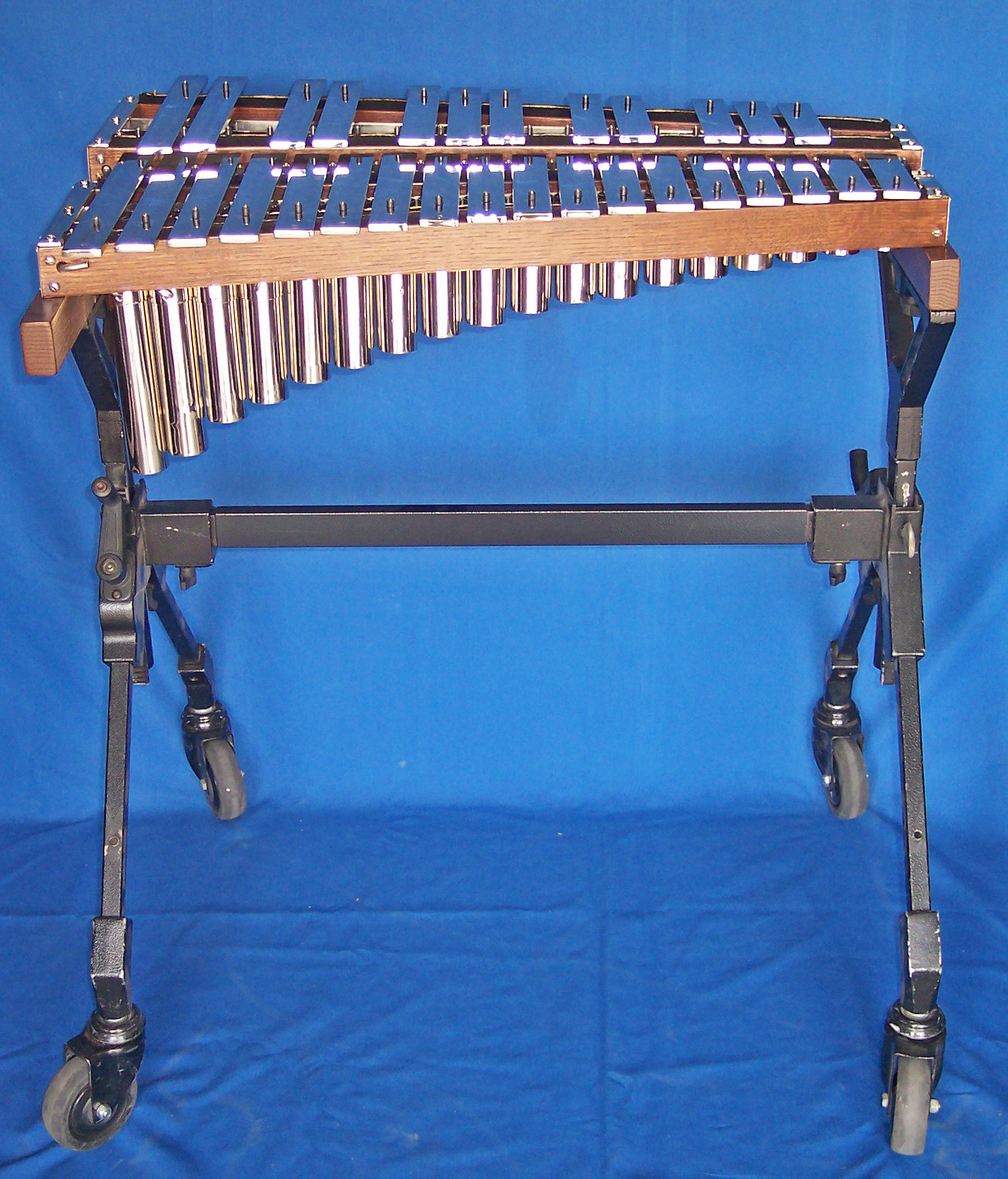
- A set of Deagan song bells

Percussion instrument
- Other names: Celeste song bells
- Classification: Keyboard percussion

Playing range
- G_{4}–C_{7} (can vary, such as F_{4}–C_{7} or C_{4}–C_{7})

Related instruments
- Glockenspiel; vibraphone; celesta

Builders
- J. C. Deagan, Inc.

Song bells are a musical instrument in the keyboard percussion family. They are a mallet percussion instrument in the metallophone family that is essentially a cross between the vibraphone, glockenspiel, and celesta. They have bars made of aluminum.

They sound one octave down from the glockenspiel, or one octave above concert pitch and generally have a range of 2 1/2 octaves. Song bells have been made by various makers at different times but were first introduced by J. C. Deagan, Inc. in 1918 and manufactured by the company until 1924.

== See also ==
- Glockenspiel
- Vibraphone
- Celesta
