= Stevens grip =

Percussion instrument technique

Stevens grip is a technique for playing keyboard percussion instruments with four mallets developed by Leigh Howard Stevens. While marimba performance with two, four, and even six mallets had been done for more than a century, Stevens developed this grip based on the Musser grip, looking to expanded musical possibilities. Stevens codified his grip and his approach to performance techniques developed during his studies at the Eastman School of Music in his 1979 book, Method of Movement for Marimba. In this book, Stevens explains that his grip is an evolution of the Musser grip, and it is sometimes called the Musser-Stevens grip.

== Grip ==
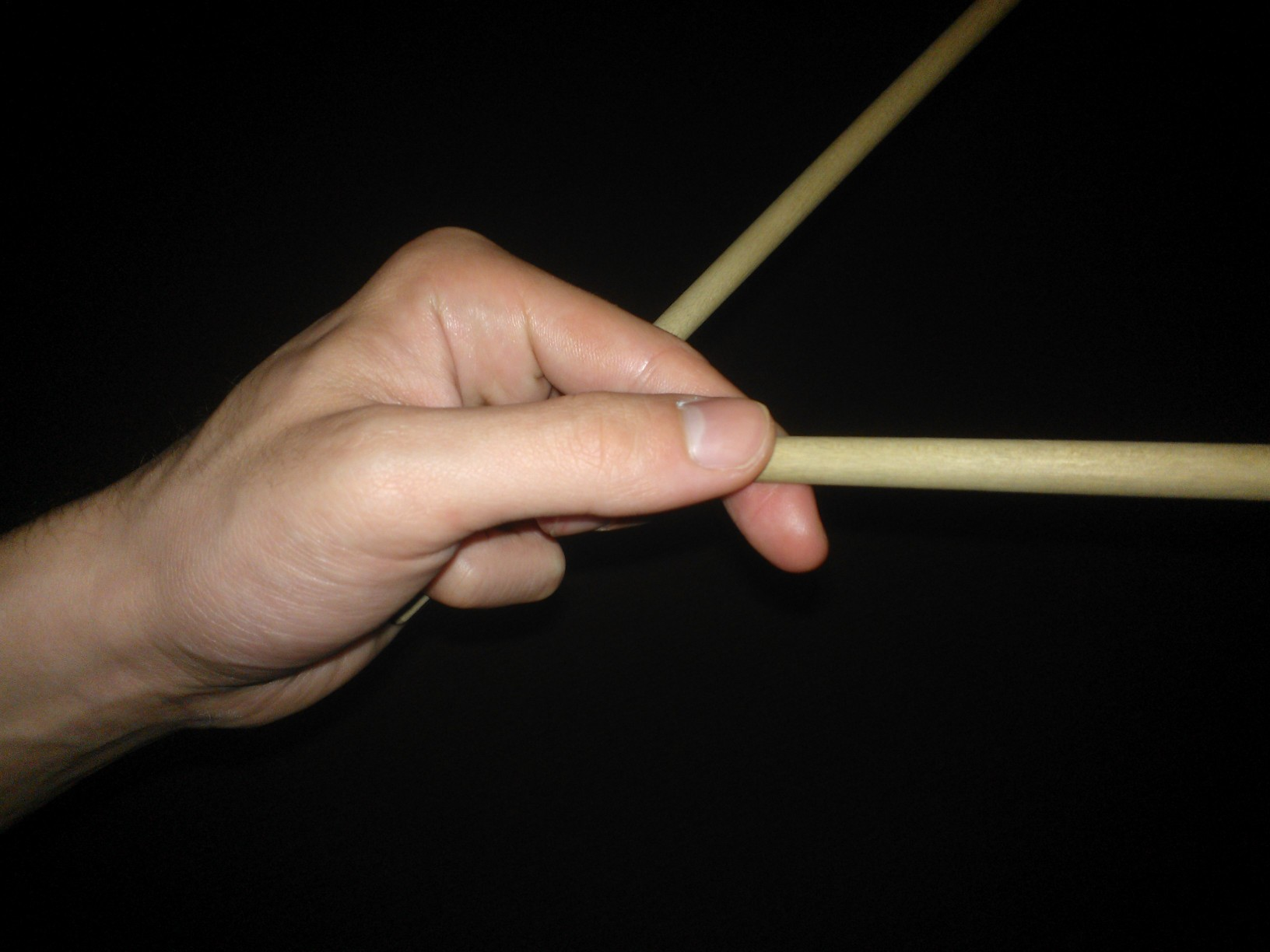
This is an image of four-mallet Stevens grip for marimba, viewed from the top.

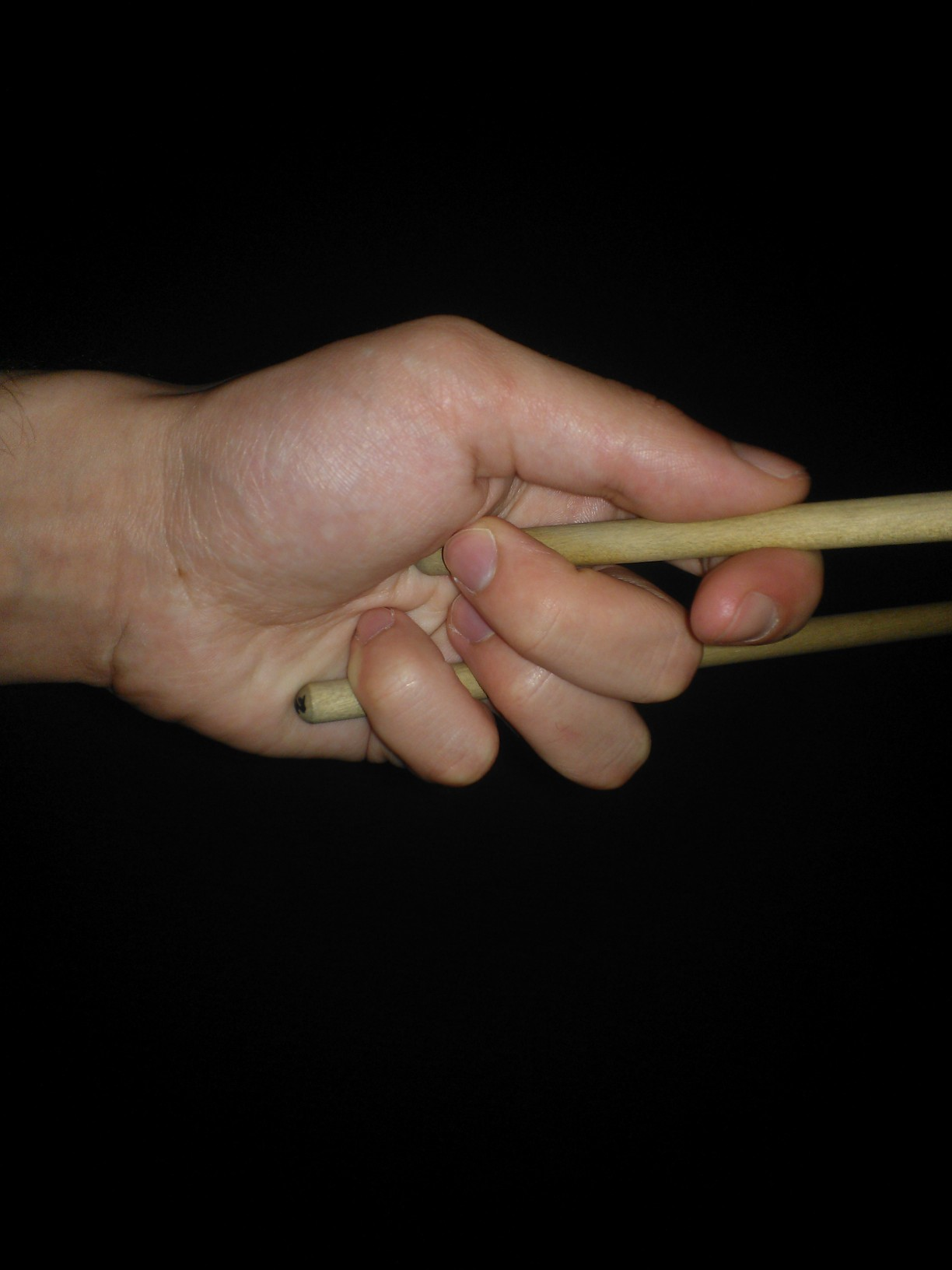
Stevens grip, from the side.

In Stevens grip, the mallets are held loosely. The first mallet, which becomes the left-most mallet, will be placed between the middle and ring finger, with the little and ring fingers wrapped around the mallet and less than an inch of the mallet hanging past the end of the hand when the palm faces upward. The end of the second mallet will be placed directly into the middle of the palm. Once the end of the mallet is placed in the middle point of the palm, the thumb and pointer finger will pinch the mallet. The middle finger will wrap around the end of the second mallet to add support. The same placements of the mallets apply to the right hand, with the right-most mallet mimicking the first mallet's placement and the third mallet mimicking the second mallet's placement. When placed over a mallet instrument, all four mallets should be held at the same height and depth. Arms should bisect the two mallets held in each of the hands. The palms of the hands will face each other. The tops of the thumb nails will ideally face towards the opposite eye of the player, meaning that the top of the left thumb nail will face the right eye when in a playing position, and vice versa.

Interval changes are accomplished by moving the inside and outside mallets independently of one another, as described in Stevens' book, Method of Movement for Marimba. As the interval widens, the inside mallet rolls between the thumb and index finger, such that the index finger moves from underneath to the side of the shaft, and the middle finger becomes the fulcrum of the cantilever. The outside mallet is moved principally with the little and ring fingers, although the first section of the middle finger follows along and remains in light contact. When properly used, this grip causes no tension on the hand muscles.

== Movements ==
There are three major movements associated with Stevens grip. While playing, the hands and arms should be relaxed, but the muscles engaged. The first movement focuses on the movement of both mallets hitting the board at the same time. To achieve this movement, the player will only move the wrist in an up and down motion. The second movement is achieved through the movement of the two outer mallets, or the first and fourth mallets. These mallets should be moved with only the rotation of the forearm and the two inner mallets, or the second and third mallets, should only have a stationary rotation. The third motion is the movement of the inner mallets. This motion should also be achieved by the rotation of the forearm.

== Stroke types ==
The "piston stroke" is an essential component of Stevens grip. With this stroke, the mallets start in the up position, strike the bars, then return to the up position. The mallets are propelled completely by the wrist, and there is no prep stroke. When changing notes, the piston stroke is modified so that it starts above the first note and ends above the second note, ready to strike.

Strokes are further divided into four categories of motion. "Single independent" strokes involve moving the inside or outside mallets singly, pivoting around the shaft of the unused mallet. "Single alternating" strokes are used in single note patterns to be played by the same hand, alternating the inside and outside mallets. "Double vertical" strokes are used in playing double notes simultaneously by the same hand. "Double lateral" strokes are used for fast, rhythmically adjacent notes to be played by the same hand.

This method of striking the bars is designed for accuracy and efficiency, since it attempts to eliminate all wasted motion. The piston stroke consolidates the preparation for each stroke into the recovery of the previous stroke.

== Comparison to other grips ==
There are three main grips used by mallet players: traditional crossed, Burton grip (developed by jazz vibraphonist Gary Burton as a variation of traditional crossed), and Stevens. The traditional crossed grip and Stevens grip are primarily used by classical marimba players (the former being more popular in Asia, while the latter is more popular in Europe and the Americas). Burton grip is primarily used by jazz vibraphonists.

Crossed-style grips make learning basic mallet control easy and provide a very wide dynamic range with stability, while the Stevens grip may be harder to master. Additionally, since Stevens grip is intended to place minimal tension on the hand muscles, the mallets exert greater leverage when they are in motion because they are held at the very ends. This requires greater muscle control than crossed-style grips. As both grips carry advantages and disadvantages, their usage must be decided situationally.

== See also ==
- Burton grip
