= John Serry Jr. =

American jazz pianist and composer (born 1954)

- Born: John Serrapica Jr. January 19, 1954 (age 72); New York City
- Genres: Jazz, Classical, Jazz fusion
- Occupations: composer, pianist, percussionist, arranger, record producer, bandleader, educator
- Instruments: piano, percussion, synthesizer
- Years active: 1973–present
- Labels: Chrysalis Records, Telarc Records

John Serry Jr. (born John Serrapica Jr.; January 19, 1954) is an American jazz pianist and composer, as well as a composer of contemporary classical music works that feature percussion, on which he also doubles. He is a son of the accordionist and composer John Serry. His debut solo album was 'Exhibition' (1979 Chrysalis Records), for which he received a Grammy Nomination (Best Instrumental Arrangement) for his composition, 'Sabotage'.

== Early career ==
Serry began his musical education at the age four on the accordion under the instruction of his father John Serry, a noted concert accordionist and organist. These studies continued until the age of eleven, when he elected to concentrate on the piano and drums.

In his teens, Serry studied percussion with Juilliard instructor Gordon Gottlieb and performed the Darius Milhaud Percussion and Paul Creston Marimba Concertos, the latter on a European tour with the Long Island Youth Orchestra (Summer 1973). In 1975, while a student at the Eastman School of Music, Serry was awarded Best Pianist, Best Composer-Arranger (Combo) and, as part of the group Auracle (then called Inner Vision), Best Combo in the 1975 Notre Dame Jazz Festival. The judges were Sonny Rollins and Jack DeJohnette, among others. Auracle was later signed to Chrysalis Records and recorded 'Glider' (1978) on which Serry played piano and keyboards and for which he composed four of the compositions. The album was co-produced by Miles Davis' producer, Teo Macero, and the group performed at the 1978 Montreux Jazz Festival. In 1980, Serry's first published classical works were entered into the Studio 4 catalogue, including 'Conversations for Timpani Duo', 'Duet for Percussion and Keyboards' and later (1988), 'Therapy' (for multiple percussion soloist). 'Rhapsody for Marimba' ("Night Rhapsody") was published by Marimba Productions in 1980.

== Los Angeles years ==
From 1976 to 1979, while living in Los Angeles, Serry played piano and keyboards on motion picture and television soundtracks (e.g., The Stunt Man, Vegas). From 1981 to 1987, still in Los Angeles, he composed soundtracks for numerous documentary and corporate films, most of them produced by Armand Hammer Productions (a division of Occidental Petroleum) and many of which received Cine Golden Eagle awards (e.g., 'From the Garden of the Middle Kingdom', 1982). In 1983, he toured in the U.S. as pianist with Doc Severinsen's quintet, Xebron.

From 1983 to 1985, Serry composed the music for the Bard Productions videos of the Shakespeare plays, The Tempest (starring Efrem Zimbalist Jr.), Othello (William Marshall, Jenny Agutter) and Antony and Cleopatra (Lynn Redgrave, Timothy Dalton, Bravo Channel). In 1979, Serry was commissioned, by marimba soloist Leigh Howard Stevens, to compose a work for solo marimba. The result, 'Rhapsody for Marimba' (aka "Night Rhapsody"), was premiered by Stevens that year at The Town Hall (New York City).

In 1985, Serry was commissioned, by percussion soloist Steve Houghton, to compose the 'Concerto for Percussion Brass and Percussion', which was premiered at 1985 Percussive Arts Society (PAS) International Convention and for which Serry was awarded Third Prize in the 1985 PAS competition. In 1986, he revised his work 'Intrusions (for 10 percussionists)' for a performance at the Aspen Music Festival (Jonathan Haas, conductor).

In 1987, he was again commissioned by Leigh Howard Stevens, this time to compose the 'Concerto for Marimba and Wind Ensemble' which was premiered at the Kennedy Center with Stevens as soloist and the Madison University Wind Ensemble. In 1988, 'Intrusions' was performed at Alice Tully Hall, Lincoln Center, by the Juilliard Percussion Ensemble with Roland Kohloff conducting. During 1988, Serry arranged several works of Gabrieli for the Canadian Brass, including for their album, Gabrieli/Monteverdi (1989 Sony/CBS). Serry played principal percussion in a concert of the Bartók Sonata for Two Pianos and Percussion (California Chamber Symphony, Los Angeles, 1985) along with Gordon Gottlieb and pianists John and Antoinette Perry. During his years based in Los Angeles (1976–1988), Serry played piano at numerous jazz venues, including The Light House, Donte's, The Baked Potato, Carmello's and the Laguna Beach Jazz Festival.

== Academic career – I ==
From 1988 to 1991, Serry was Associate Professor of Music and Director of Jazz at the University of South Carolina, Columbia. While there, he instituted several new courses and revised the curriculum for the bachelor's and master's degrees with jazz emphasis. He also formed and conducted concerts of a jazz and studio orchestra, and produced semi-annual jazz festivals with guest artists, including Marian McPartland, Bill Watrous, Bob Sheppard and others. (Saxophonist Chris Potter, who was then a high school student, participated in the festival concerts and also played in Serry's quartet.)

== New York years ==
Serry moved back to New York City in 1991. There he performed with his quartet at numerous jazz venues, including The Blue Note, Birdland, Visiones, Steinway Hall and others. Members of his groups included drummers John Riley and Marvin 'Smitty' Smith, saxophonists Gerry Niewood, Ralph Bowen and Ted Nash, bassists Anthony Jackson and Tom Brigandi and percussionist Gordon Gottlieb. During the 1990s, Serry also composed music for television commercials (e.g., for Grey Advertising). He also played the piano/keyboards and percussion, in several Broadway shows (e.g., 'Saturday Night Fever', 'Cats' and 'Les Misérables') and conducted at Radio City Music Hall. He was Music Director and pianist for the Gateway Playhouse production of the Broadway jazz musical, 'Swing', featuring the music of Duke Ellington, Glenn Miller and others. In 1992, Serry played percussion on Stravinsky's 'Les noces' at Lincoln Center, conducted by Robert Craft (released on the Musicmasters CD, 'Stravinsky, the Composer', Vol. II). In 2002/3, Serry toured on piano/keyboards with several shows, including a U.S. tour of 'Saturday Night Fever' and European tours of 'Fame' and 'Grease', for which he was Assistant Music Director.

== London ==
In 2004, Serry moved to London where he formed a quartet with Dave O'Higgins saxophone, Mark Mondesir drums and, variously Mike Mondesir or Sam Burgess on bass. The group played several times a year at The 606 Club (in Chelsea), as well as at other venues. In 2006, Serry recorded the album, 'The Shift' with that quartet, but it was not until 2013 that 'The Shift' (SPCo Records) was released, after a remix in Bologna, Italy. Also while living in London, Serry played a solo and duo piano concert, in 2005, at Covent Garden (Floral Hall) with pianist Julian Joseph. The concert was broadcast by BBC Radio 3 on 'Jazz Legends Live', and was the second 'Jazz Legends' program done by BBC Radio 3 on Serry, the first having been in 2004. Along with these activities, Serry taught at the Royal Academy of Music (Autumn 2004) and played keyboards in the London production (2005) and UK tour (2006) of 'Saturday Night Fever'. In addition, he played piano with Patti Austin, the BBC Big Band, Kyle Eastwood and The 606 Big Band.

== Spain, Czech Republic, Italy ==
For part of 2006 and most of 2007, Serry was in Valencia, Spain, working on a book and playing only a few concerts (e.g., at Conservatorio de Musica Josep Climent, Oliva). In early 2008, Serry toured the Czech Republic playing his compositions with a group of Prague musicians organized by guitarist Adam Tvrdy. Afterwards, he played in several Prague jazz venues (e.g., Reduta Theatre, Agharta) with his own and other jazz groups. Since the start of 2009, Serry has performed throughout Italy, primarily in Bologna, Emilia-Romagna and Sicily. His trio, with Bruno Farinelli drums and Paolo Ghetti bass, has recorded Serry's latest album, "Disquisition" (SPCo Records), released on December 18, 2017. The album's title track was premiered on BBC Radio 3, December 16, 2017, on Jazz Line-Up. In 2009, Serry was commissioned by an international consortium of marimba soloists, organized by Ji Hye Jung, to write another solo work for marimba. The work, 'Groundlines', was premiered by Ji Hye Jung at the Percussive Arts Society International Convention 2010.

== Academic career – II ==
Academic career (as educator and in education): Serry has taught classes, ensembles, lessons, seminars and workshops at several schools of music. He coached percussion ensembles at Peabody Conservatory (1986, Jonathan Haas conductor) and at The Juilliard School (1988, Roland Kohloff, conductor) for performances of his composition, 'Intrusions'. He taught a workshop on his compositions at the Musicians Institute (Los Angeles, 1982). He completed two artist residencies at Wichita State University, one in 1985 in which he coached a student ensemble on his composition, 'Concerto for Percussion Brass and Percussion', and played a jazz concert as pianist/composer with Rufus Reid bass and Steve Houghton drums; the other in 1996 in which he gave a lecture on the music business and his jazz compositions, and taught jazz piano and jazz combo. In 1987, he coached the University of Wisconsin-Whitewater wind ensemble on his 'Concerto for Marimba and Wind Ensemble' and also gave a lecture on that composition. Serry taught classes in jazz theory, arranging, music electronics/MIDI, film scoring and jazz combo at University of South Carolina-Columbia (1988–91). From 1994 to 1996, he taught percussion at Jersey City State College. During the 1990s, he was a guest lecturer on the music business at CUNY (Manhattan) and Queens College, a substitute teacher (jazz improvisation) at NYU and coached the Brooklyn College percussion ensemble on 'Intrusions' (Morris Lang, conductor). In the UK, he taught a course in jazz combo at the Royal Academy in 2004/5 and gave a lecture on his jazz compositions at Cardiff University in 2005. In 2011/12, he taught a course in jazz improvisation at Music Academy 2000 in Bologna, Italy. Serry has BM (with Distinction) and MM degrees from the Eastman School of Music (Professors Bill Dobbins, Chuck Mangione, John Beck, and Rayburn Wright; lessons with Marian McPartland; workshops and concerts including playing drums with Keith Jarrett and piano with Joe Farrell and Bill Watrous).

== Discography ==
His debut solo album was 'Exhibition' (1979 Chrysalis Records), for which he received a Grammy Nomination (Best Instrumental Arrangement) for his composition, 'Sabotage'. The players included Carlos Vega drums, Jimmy Johnson bass, Gordon Johnson bass, Bob Sheppard saxophone/woodwinds, Gordon Gottlieb percussion and Barry Finnerty guitar. His second album, 'Jazziz' (1980 Chrysalis Records) received four stars in Downbeat Magazine and feature review of the month in Keyboard magazine; it was also the inspiration for the naming, in 1983, of JAZZIZ magazine by publisher Michael Fagien. The personnel was the same as that of 'Exhibition', except with Mike Sembello on guitar and Peter Erskine playing drums on two tracks. Serry's third album was 'Enchantress' (1996 Telarc) about which Downbeat Magazine wrote: "He has a strong sense of melody, his touch is confident, his ideas are sensible and his playing is beautifully controlled." Of 'Enchantress', Jim Aikin wrote in Keyboard magazine: "What a pleasure to find that he is back, still turning out charts that turn heads by turning corners." and Hilary Grey wrote in JazzTimes: "Serry's fleet fingered runs on songs like the jaunty, catchy 'DYT it' are both technically impressive and subtle." 'Enchantress' was recorded after Serry had been awarded the Grand Prize in the 1995 JAZZIZ magazine 'Keyboards on Fire' pianist/composer competition, judged by Dave Brubeck and Bob James (grand piano awarded by Steinway). The musicians were John Riley drums, Gerry Niewood and Ralph Bowen sax and Tom Brigandi bass. All of the compositions (and arrangements) for all three albums were by Serry and he was Producer for 'Exhibition' and 'Jazziz'. Serry's fourth album was The Shift (2013, SPCo Records), followed by Disquisition (2017, SPCo Records). The notes provided by John Serry Jr. on his trio album Disquisition indicate that he is the sole composer of three new compositions including: Disquisition, Monody and Too, Two Blues. In addition, they indicate that the album includes new arrangements of several of his own compositions which were initially featured on his previous albums including: Dance One, Enchantress, from his album Enchantress (1996) and The One, The Shift from his album The Shift (2013). Each of these compositions are performed by Serry's trio which includes Serry Jr. on piano, Paolo Ghetti on bass and Bruno Farinelli on drums.
