= National Marching Band of the RAF Air Cadets =

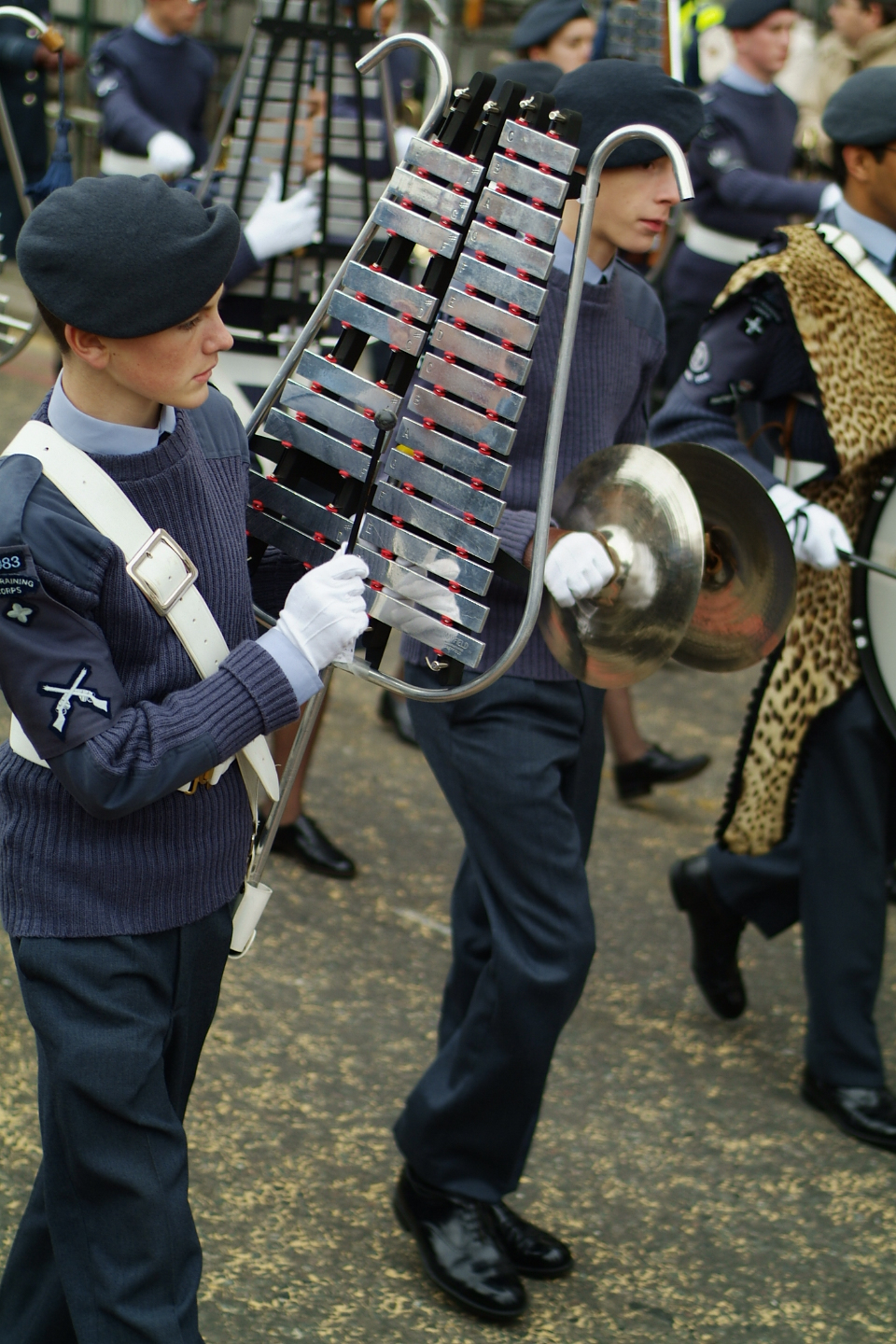
- Active: 2008 to 2026
- Country: United Kingdom
- Branch: Royal Air Force
- Type: military band marching band
- Size: 43 musicians
- Part of: Royal Air Force Air Cadets
- Headquarters: Fort Blockhouse, Hampshire, England
- Nicknames: RAFAC band; Air Cadet National Marching Band
- Colors: Blue
- March: Royal Air Force March Past

Insignia
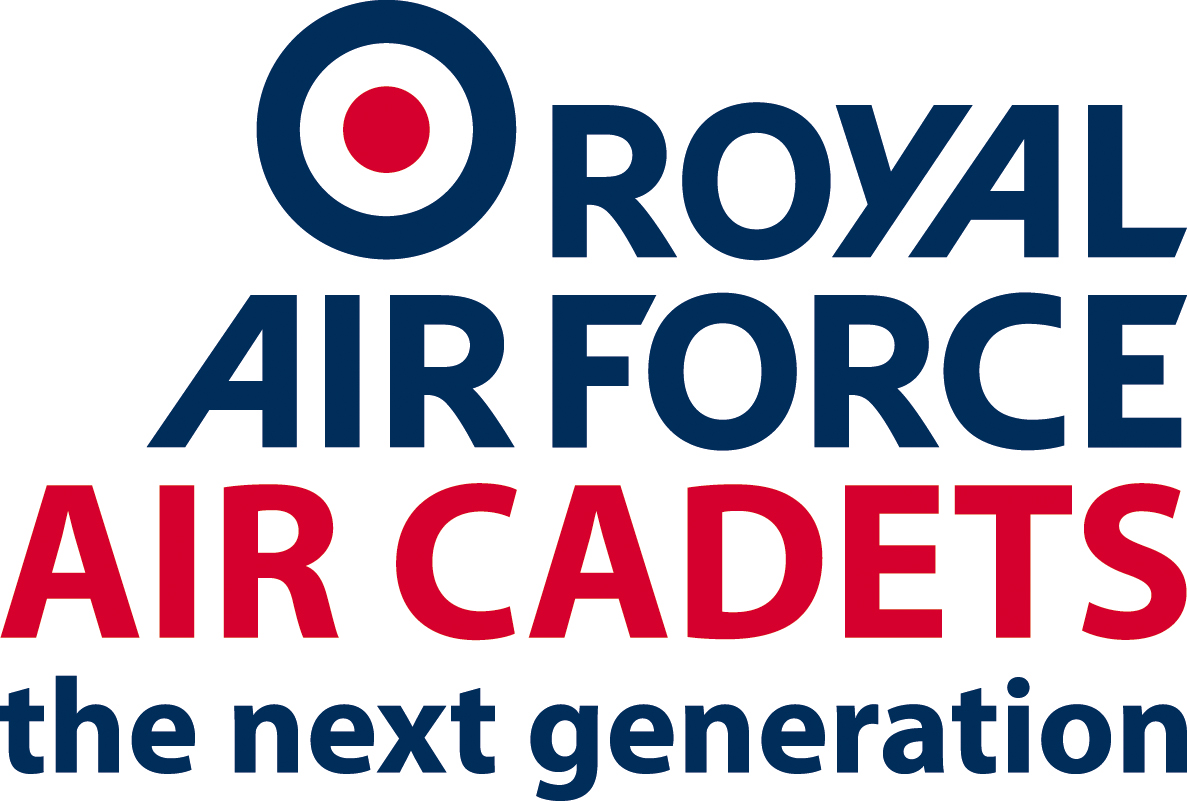
- RAFAC Banner

The National Marching Band of the RAF Air Cadets is a military band made up of teenage musicians of the Royal Air Force Air Cadets. It is considered to be a key musical ambassador for the RAFAC, with the band having given many notable performances at 10 Downing Street, Lincoln Cathedral, Twickenham Stadium, Whitehall and the International Air Tattoo.

== RAFAC music camp ==
Music camps, which are sponsored by the RAFAC, are held annually at RAF College Cranwell and help train cadets in the RAFAC Music Service and, specifically, cadets in the national marching band.

== Activities ==
- RAF anniversary parades
- St George's Day Parade
- Remembrance Day Parade
- Annual General Inspection (AGI) at Welbeck Defence Sixth Form College
- Charity events

Individual wing bands also perform in activities in their localities.

== Instrumentation ==
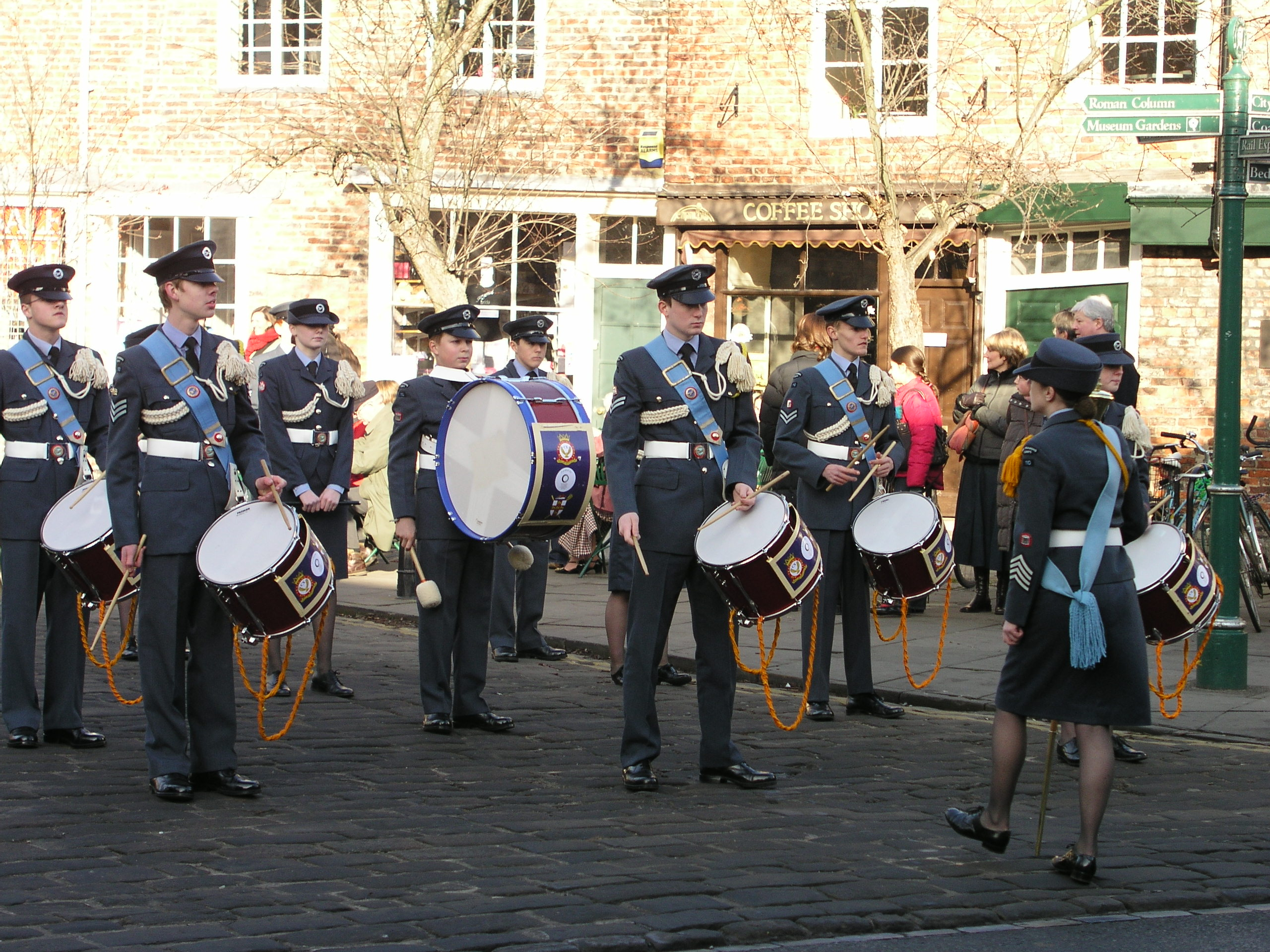
An ATC Marching Band from City of York Squadron.

The following is a list of standard instruments catered for by the RAFAC Band:

- Saxophones
- Tubas
- Euphoniums
- Clarinets
- Bugles
- Cornets
- Trumpets
- Trombones
- Basses
- Cymbals
- Side drum
- Bass drum

== See also ==
- Royal Air Force
- Fort Blockhouse
- Royal Air Force March Past
- Royal Air Force Air Cadets
- Air Training Corps
- Activities of the Air Training Corps
