= Leigh Howard Stevens =

American musician (born 1953)

Leigh Howard Stevens (born March 9, 1953, in Orange, New Jersey) is a marimba artist best known for developing, codifying, and promoting the Stevens technique or Musser-Stevens grip, a method of independent four-mallet marimba performance based on the Musser grip.

== Studies ==
Leigh Howard Stevens studied under some of the most prominent percussion teachers and performers of his time, including jazz drummer Joe Morello, and marimbist Vida Chenoweth, with whom he studied in New Zealand the summer after his freshman year of college. Stevens pursued his college studies at the Eastman School of Music planning to be a drum set player. Stevens recalls, "I noticed when I got to Eastman that the techniques I was using--the one-handed roll, rotary strokes, doing Baroque trills with one hand, two-part Bach inventions, things like that--got a lot of attention. Other people seemed to think that I had a lot of talent on the marimba. I gradually began to realize that I had the potential of being a much better marimba player than I had of becoming a world-class drum set player." Stevens promptly switched to concert percussion, studied with John Beck and received a Performer's Certificate.

== Method of Movement for Marimba ==
During the 1970s, Stevens began writing down his thoughts and exercises he invented in order to facilitate the mastery of this new technique. The result was his pedagogical treatise Method of Movement for Marimba, first published in 1979 by his own company, Marimba Productions. Method of Movement for Marimba describes Stevens' method for holding marimba mallets, efficient utilization of motion, and includes over 500 musical exercises for the student. Method of Movement (often shortened to MOM) was the first textbook to fully describe a complete method for holding and playing with 4 mallets. Stevens came up with the technique after learning several other grips and considers his technique an outgrowth of the Musser grip. The Stevens technique is defined by a vertical hand position (in contrast to the previous flat-palmed Musser player), pivoting around either unused mallet (instead of lifting the unused mallet out of the way), and moving the end of the inside mallet through the palm for larger intervals.

=== Stroke Types ===
Single Independent Strokes: the ability to strike single (or repeated single) strokes without moving the unused mallet held in that hand.

Single Alternating Strokes: executed as if they were alternating single independent strokes, these strokes consist of discrete, side to side rockings of the hand.

Double Vertical Strokes: a stroke that produces two pitches simultaneously. (It is somewhat of "double stop" with one hand).

Double Lateral Strokes: single motions that produce two successive pitches. It begins as a double vertical stroke but goes through a split second metamorphosis where one mallet strikes before the other.

== Performance ==
Stevens' performance at the first PASIC (Percussive Arts Society International Convention) in Rochester, New York, in 1976 was a seminal event for all in attendance. For the first time, many percussion performers and teachers were seeing someone performing with a quasi-Musser grip but with an unprecedented degree of flexibility. Stevens was not attempting to revolutionize the percussion world; rather, he was merely performing in what he thought was a natural method for the marimba.

It would be difficult to overstate how different the attitudes and assumptions about four-mallet marimba playing were at the time that MOM was written. Since I had been doing an independent roll from the moment I began playing xylophone in 1969, I personally had no appreciation of how "revolutionary" the technique was, but as late as 1976, when I performed at the first Percussive Arts Society International Convention, most percussionists were seeing the independent roll, my "vertical Musser grip", rotary-based strokes and my extended-length birch handles for the first time.

— Leigh Howard Stevens, Method of Movement for Marimba

Stevens continues to be an active performer and clinician worldwide and has appeared at a dozen Percussive Arts Society International Conventions (PASIC) since 1976, and served as Professor of Marimba at the Royal Academy of Music in London, England, from 1997 to 2004. From 1980 to the present, he has held a three-week Summer Marimba Seminar in Ocean Grove, New Jersey where an average of 30 students from around the world come participate in an intensive study of music and the Stevens’ technique with Stevens himself.

On November 10, 2006, Stevens was officially inducted into the Percussive Arts Society Hall of Fame during the 2006 PASIC in Austin, Texas. He is an alumnus of Columbia High School in Maplewood, New Jersey, and was inducted into the school's Hall of Fame.

== Marimba Productions, Inc. ==
Stevens started his own publishing company, Marimba Productions, in 1979 because he could not find a publishing company for his MOM manuscript. Still in business today, Marimba Productions Inc. comprises Malletech instruments and mallets, Keyboard Percussion Publications, and Resonator Records. Marimba Productions Inc. also includes acquisitions: Music Project, M.Baker Publications, Percussion Arts and Studio 4 Music.

== Works ==
=== Original Compositions ===
- Houdini's Last Trick
- Rhythmic Caprice
- Great Wall

=== Transcriptions ===
- Christ Lag in Todesbanden (J.S. Bach)
- Album for the Young II (Schumann)
- Adventure's of Ivan (Khachaturian)
- Sonata in A Minor (Bach)
- Prelude and Fugue in B-flat Major (Bach)
- Album for the Young (Tchaikovsky)
- Sonata in B Minor (Bach)
- Two Part Inventions (Bach)
- Album for the Young I (Schumann)
- Children's Corner (Debussy)

=== Major pieces written for or commissioned by Leigh Howard Stevens ===
- Jacob Druckman:

Reflections on the Nature of Water ^{1}

- Matthew Harris:

Potpourri ^{2}

- Raymond Helble:

Grand Fantasy in C Major

Toccata Fantasy in E-flat minor

Preludes for Marimba (Nos. 1–3, Nos. 4–6, Nos. 7–9)

Concerto for Orchestra and Marimba

Concerto for Marimba and Percussion Ensemble

Movement for Marimba and Harpsichord

Two Movements for Marimba and String Quartet

Duo Concertante (for marimba and violin)

- David Maslanka:

Variations on Lost Love

- William Penn:

Four Preludes for Marimba

- Roger Reynolds:

Autumn Island ^{1}

- Joseph Schwantner:

Velocites ^{1}

- John Serry Jr.:

Rhapsody for Marimba, "Night Rhapsody"

West Side Suite

- Gordon Stout:

Beads of Glass

Diptych No. 4

Route 666

- Christopher Stowens:

Atamasco and the Wooden Shalter^{2} (for Synthesized Tape and Amplified Marimba)

1 commissioned by a consortium of William Moersch, Gordon Stout, and Stevens

== Discography ==
- Bach on Marimba
- Marimba When
