= Fulcrum (drumming) =

Fulcrum is a drumming term. Traditionally, the fulcrum refers to the part of a percussionist's grip that is the main lever for the drum stick to rotate. This is usually created by the thumb and index finger, the thumb and middle finger, or a combination of the thumb, index, and middle fingers.

== Fulcrum and lever definitions ==
=== Fingers ===
If one consciously locks their wrist, elbow, and shoulder so that they remain stationary, the only degree of freedom left to move the stick is the finger lever. The fulcrum, or point of rotation, will be located approximately where the pad of the thumb meets the stick. The thumb acts as the fulcrum while the other 4 fingers can apply mechanical forces to the stick. This lever is controlled with the smallest muscles and involves the least amount of mass in motion. Because there is less mass and less inertia, the fingers and thumb will be used to move the stick at high frequencies.

=== Wrist ===
If one then locks the fingers in place by placing a tight grip on the stick the only way to raise and lower the stick is by rotating the wrist. The point of rotation is now somewhere in the middle of the wrist. The wrist is used to move the stick in larger motions leading to higher volume notes. The wrist is almost always used in conjunction with the fingers. If one were to hold their sticks or mallets with a 'death grip' while using only wrist rotation, there is the possibility of tendinitis or carpal tunnel syndrome occurring.

=== Forearm ===
The forearm can be thought of as a shock absorber for the wrist and fingers. In general, the forearms will move slightly as a reaction to the forces the wrist and fingers are putting on the sticks. There is disagreement in the drum community regarding how much arm motion should be used. If one then freezes the wrist and finger levers they can move their stick, hand, and forearm by rotating at the elbow.

Each lever in the 'system' is suited to a particular purpose. In general they all work together to make up a 'correct' technique, allowing one to command their sticks/mallets to move exactly as they wish.

== External link and reference ==
- Drumming mechanics at www.snarescience.com
