= Celestaphone (disambiguation) =

Celestaphone (Joseph Murphy, born 1996) is an American hip hop music producer.

Celestaphone may also refer to:

- Celestaphone (instrument), a musical instrument of the zither family.
- Celestaphone, a glockenspiel-like instrument made from meteorites by Clair Omar Musser
