= Tremoloa =

Stringed instrument of the fretless zither family

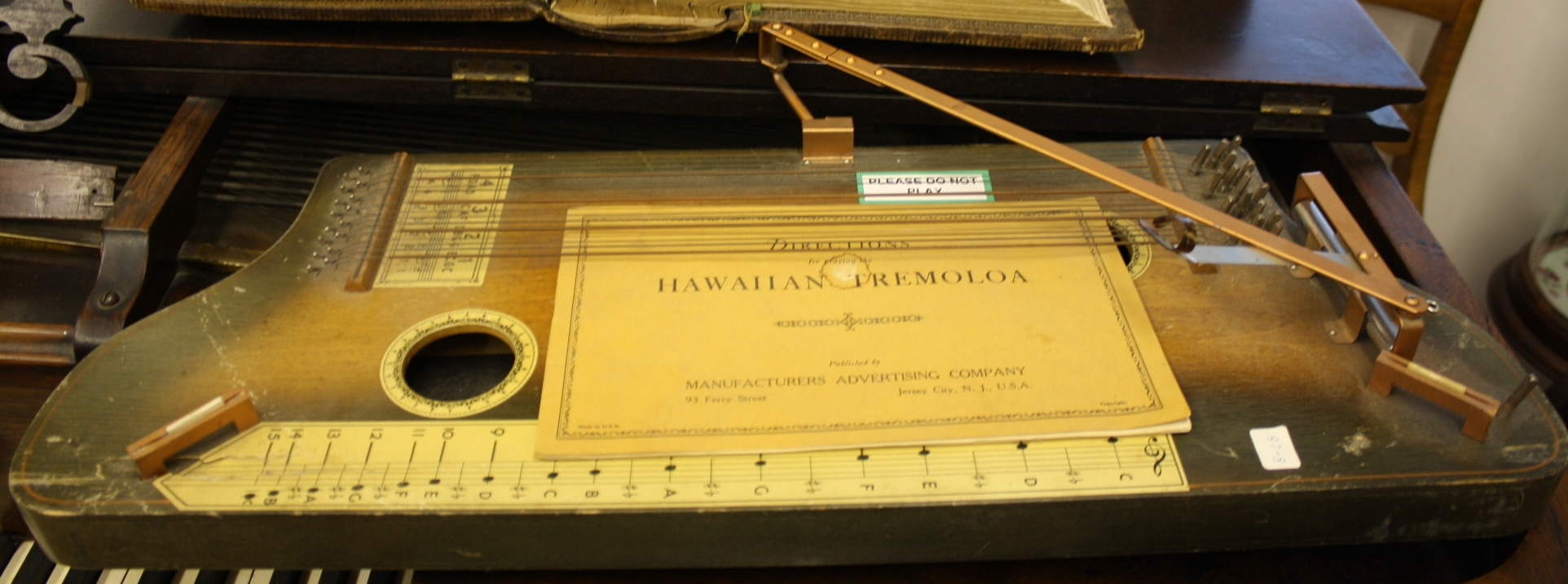
- A rare tremoloa with staggered soundholes on display in the Dickinson County Historical Museum

String instrument
- Other names: Hawaiian tremoloa, fr: Trémoloa
- Hornbostel–Sachs classification: 314.122-6 (Board zither sounded by a plectrum)
- Inventor(s): Harold Finney, John H. Large
- Developed: Early 20th century

Playing range

Related instruments
- Fretless zither family (includes Marxophone)

The tremoloa /ˈtreɪmoʊloʊwə/, plural tremoloas, is a stringed instrument belonging to the fretless zither family. It was produced in the United States in response to the rapid increase in popularity of Hawaiian music during the 1920s, and continued to be produced until the 1950s. Musical collective Broken Social Scene features the instrument in "Tremoloa Debut." The instrument is also featured sporadically on The Magnetic Fields' album 69 Love Songs.

The tremoloa simulates the tonal effects of the Hawaiian steel guitar by passing a weighted roller stabilized by a swinging lever termed an arm, along a melody string. Following, moving the roller after plucking creates tremolo, an effect which gave rise to its name. Additionally, the tremoloa possesses four chords (C, G, F, and D major), to strum out the harmony.

The patent for the tremoloa was granted in 1932 to Harold Finney and John H. Large.

== See also ==
- 3rd Bridge
- Pedal steel guitar
- Ukelin, an instrument by John H. Large.
