= Marxophone =

Fretless zither played via a system of metal hammers

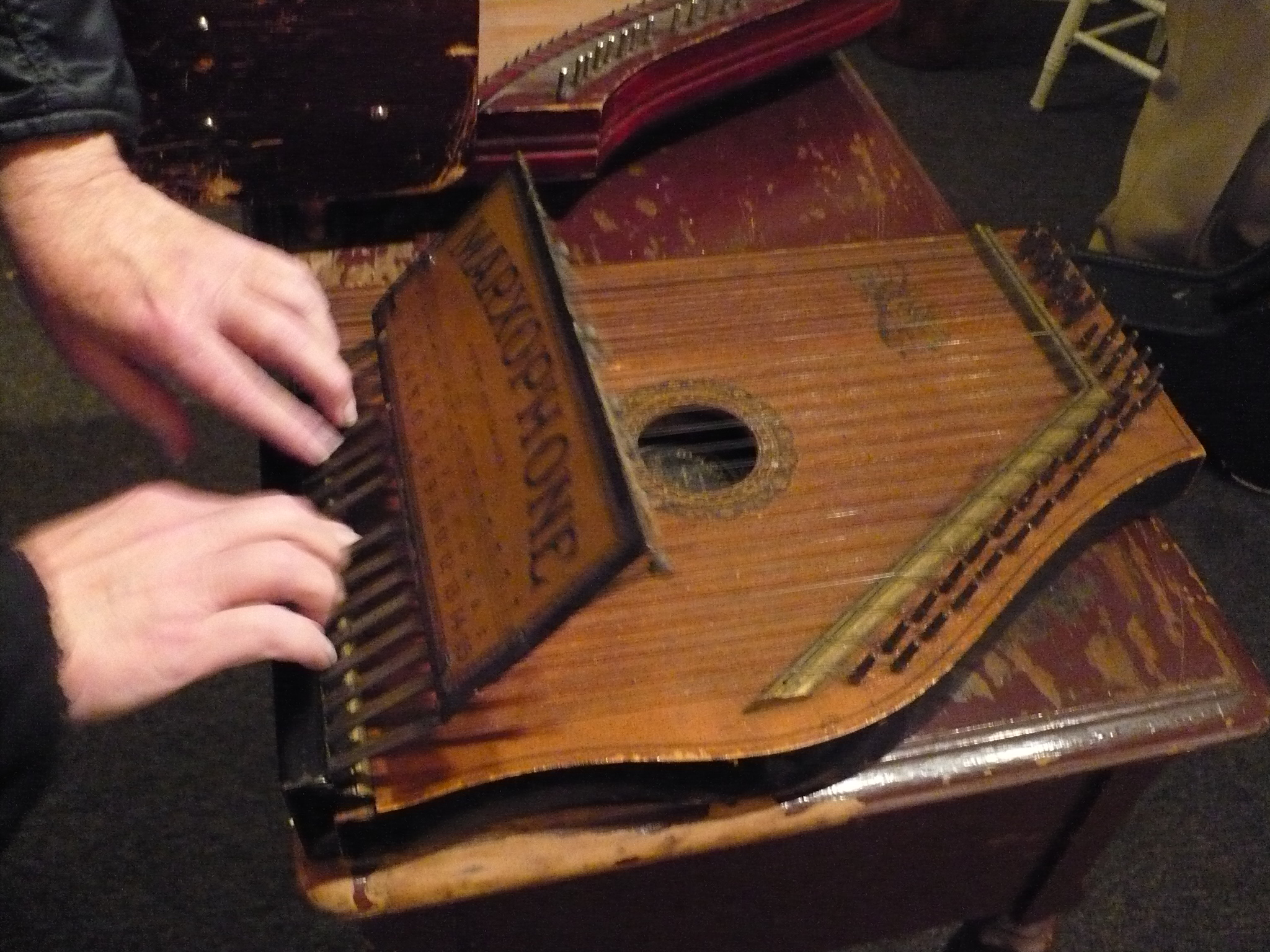
A Marxophone

The Marxophone is a fretless zither played via a system of metal hammers. It features two octaves of double melody strings in the key of C major (middle C to C''), and four sets of chord strings (C major, G major, F major, and D7). Sounding somewhat like a mandolin, the Marxophone's timbre is also reminiscent of various types of hammered dulcimers.

The player typically strums the chords with the left hand. The right hand plays the melody strings by depressing spring steel strips that hold small lead hammers over the strings. A brief stab on a metal strip bounces the hammer off a string pair to produce a single note. Holding the strip down makes the hammer bounce on the double strings, which produces a mandolin-like tremolo. The bounce rate is somewhat fixed, as it is based on the spring steel strip length, hammer weight, and string tension—but a player can increase the rate slightly by pressing higher on the strip, effectively moving its pivot point closer to the lead hammer.

Numerically coded sheet music prepared specifically for the Marxophone indicates when and in what order to play melody and chord strings. This type of music, similar to tablature, was produced for those who could not read standard notation. A rectangular piece of metal provides a backstop for the spring steel hammers, displays the name Marxophone and the patent number, and has clips that hold sheet music. It also marks the 15 keys by letter (C, D, etc.), by number (1–15) and in standard musical notation. When the instrument is moved or stored, the metal rectangle bends down, holding the keys against the strings, so the Marxophone can fit into its case—which is the size of a large briefcase.

== History ==
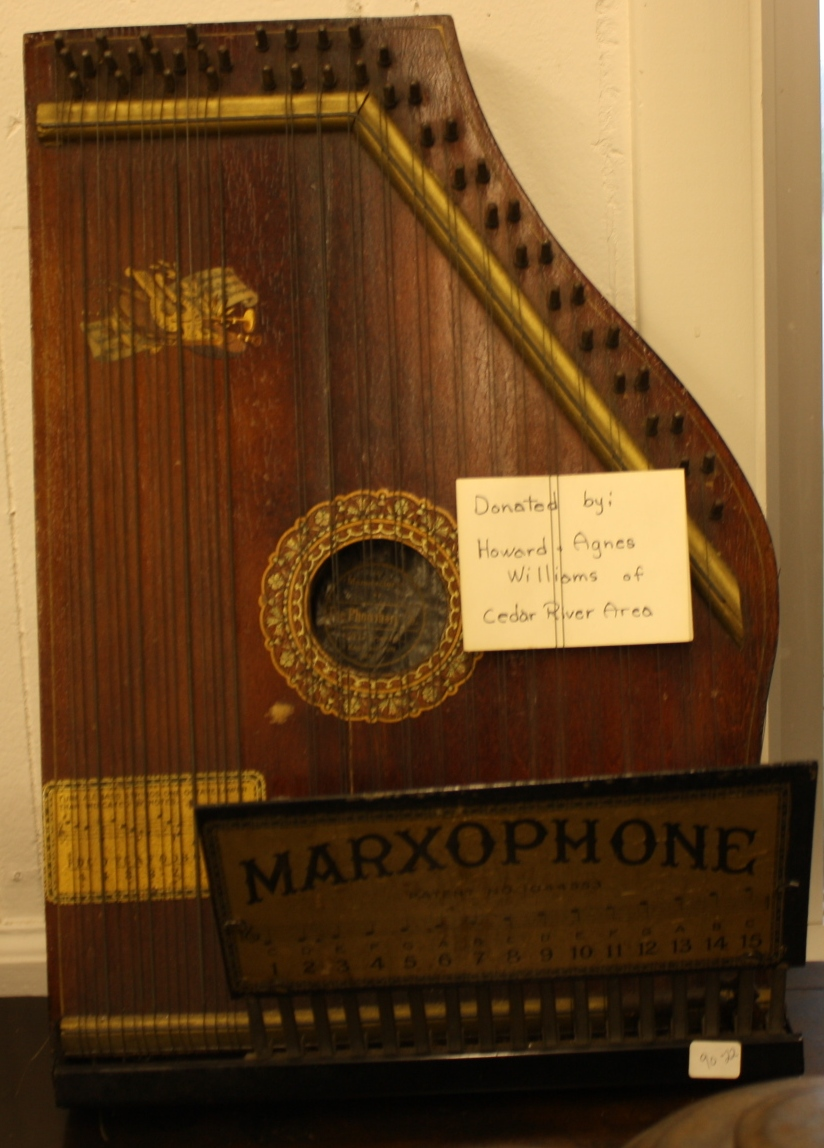
Marxophone

A common misconception is that the Marxophone was manufactured by the Marxochime Colony of New Troy, Michigan, but it was not. While the design of its hammer mechanism was patented by Henry Charles Marx (1875–1947), (pat. #1044553 issued on November 19, 1912) the Marxophone was never manufactured by the Marxochime Colony. Instead, during their tenure from 1927 to 1972, the "colony" designed and manufactured a wide assortment of "bowed" zithers, the melody strings actuated with a bow not hammers. The 1912 patent was assigned to the Phonoharp Company, which Marx was affiliated with at the time. Phonoharp manufactured Marxophones as well as Celestaphones (having a different body contour) until its merger with Oscar Schmidt Inc. in 1926. The newly formed company known as the International Musical Corporation produced Marxophones between 1926 and 1931. Then, following the International Musical Corporation's dissolution on December 30, 1931, two successor companies, the Oscar Schmidt-International Corporation (1931–1936) and Oscar Schmidt-International, Inc. (late 1936 until the present) manufactured Marxophones until the 1950s.

Marx was one of a number of late 19th century and early 20th century musical gadget manufacturers that combined two or more instruments into one. Other inventions included the Banjolin, the Hawaiiphone, the Mandolin-Uke, the Marxolin, the Pianoette, the Pianolin, and the Tremoloa. Marxophones were billed as easy to play, and sold on time-purchase plans by door-to-door salesmen, and through mail-order companies like Sears-Roebuck.

== Technology ==
Because the hammers are made of white lead, the instrument sheds small amounts of lead powder. Musicians who actively use this instrument have adopted the practice of coating the hammers in Epoxy glue, which does not affect the sound but stops the wearing away of the hammers (and prevents the poisoning of children, cats and other small creatures).

In addition to being limited to the keys of C major and A minor (and modal variants), the Marxophone is partially limited to certain tempos because of the rate at which the hammers bounce on the strings. The fixed pulse rate of the hammer strike fits the music best when it is a power-of-two denominated fraction of the pulse of the music, in other words an 8th, 16th, 32nd, or 64th note of the performance tempo.

Variants on the Marxophone idea include the "Hammer-Jammer," a hammer-frame that attaches to the fingerboard, and the 2010 "Marxoguitar" created by Ranjit Bhatnagar, which attaches to an electric guitar at the bridge to produce a Marxophone-like tremolo effect.

== Modern day use ==
The Marxophone did not become widely known to the general public, but recording artists have occasionally used it. The Doors and John Prine used its unique sound on studio recordings of the 1960s and 1970s, and it was still used more recently by notable figures such as Norway's avant-garde musician Sturle Dagsland and the American rock bands Stone Temple Pilots and Incubus.

The instrument was prominently used in the soundtrack of the BBC's series Dirk Gently.

The alternative rock band They Might Be Giants used the Marxophone on "Tippecanoe and Tyler Too".

The Marxophone was also featured in the album Yankee Hotel Foxtrot by alternative country band Wilco in "I Am Trying to Break Your Heart".

Jeff Taylor played the Marxophone on the 2021 Robert Plant and Alison Krauss album Raise the Roof.

Death Cab for Cutie keyboardist Zac Rae played the Marxophone on the band's 2026 Tiny Desk concert performance of "Soul Meets Body".

== Recordings ==
- "Alabama Song (Whisky Bar)" by The Doors
- The soundtrack for the video game Red Dead Redemption
- "Multiplied" by NEEDTOBREATHE
- "Leaving The City" by Joanna Newsom in her 2015 album Divers
- "Am I Awake?" by They Might Be Giants, the theme to the TV series Resident Life, on the 2004 EP Indestructible Object
- "Anna Molly" by Incubus in the 2006 album Light Grenades
- "Lullaby" by Judy Henske (vocals) and Jerry Yester (toy zither and Marxophone)
- "She Is Still a Mystery" by The Lovin' Spoonful
- "When Girls Get Together" by The Beach Boys
- "Behold the Night" by The Beach Boys
- ”Class Clown” and “Eleven Eleven” from Wishbone by Conan Gray

== See also ==
- Autoharp
- Dolceola
- Celestaphone
