= Oscar Schmidt Inc. =

Musical instrument manufacturer

Oscar Schmidt, Inc.
- Company type: Private (1871–1939?); Brand (1939–present)
- Industry: Musical instruments
- Founded: 1871; 154 years ago in Jersey City, New Jersey
- Founder: Oscar & Otto Schmidt
- Fate: Rights to name acquired by Harmony Company in 1939; then by Fretted Industries Inc. in 1978
- Headquarters: United States
- Area served: Worldwide
- Products: List: Guitar zithers; Autoharps; Celtic harps; Marxophones; Bowed psalteries; Electric and acoustic guitars; Banjos; Mandolins; Ukuleles
- Parent: U.S. Music Corp.
- Website: oscarschmidt.com

Oscar Schmidt was a musical instrument manufacturing company established in 1871. During its long existence, Oscar Schmidt has produced a wide range of string instruments, not only guitars but also numerous models of parlour instruments such as autoharps, celtic harps, guitar zithers, the "guitarophone" (a zither/metal-disc playing hybrid), marxophones and bowed psalteries (or "ukelins").

Through its history, the company has changed its name several times, selling under the names "Oscar Schmidt Inc.," "Oscar Schmidt Musical House," "Manufacturers Advertising Company," "Oscar Schmidt-International Corporation," and "Oscar Schmidt-International, Inc.".

Products currently sold under the Oscar Schmidt brand are electric, acoustic and classical guitars, autoharps, banjos, ukuleles and mandolins. Oscar Schmidt is currently a brand of U.S. Music Corp, a subsidiary of Canadian corporate group Exertis | JAM.

== History ==
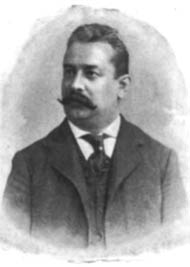
Oscar Schmidt, founder

Oscar Schmidt (1857–1929) was a German immigrant to the United States who was involved in selling musical instruments in Jersey City, New Jersey. Founded by Oscar and his brother Otto in 1871, the "Otto Schmidt Co." applied for dozens of patents in musical instruments and related equipment. The Oscar Schmidt Company was formally incorporated in 1911.

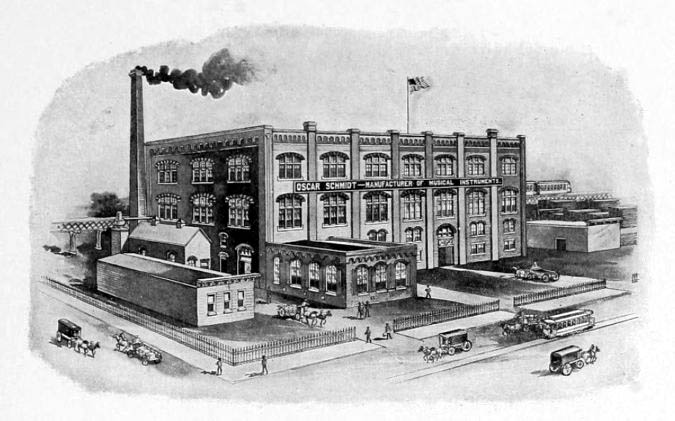
The Schmidt factory in Jersey City, 1910

At the same time, he was buying guitar zithers from another German immigrant and manufacturer, W.F. Menzenhauer, who had a factory in the same city and had developed a fretless guitar zither. Having realised the potential of Menzenhauer's invention, Schmidt partnered with him in 1896, forming together the Menzenhauer & Schmidt Company, therefore expanding the factory and enjoying commercial success.

The success of the guitar zithers by Menzenhauer & Schmidt spread not only throughout the US but worldwide. Schmidt established distributors in several cities of Europe and also in South Africa and Australia. In 1900, Schmidt bought out the company, taking total control. By 1903, the production of mandolins outstripped production of zithers. By those times, Schmidt expanded its range of products, also making banjo and guitars. In 1912, the factory had about 150 employees. At its peak in the early 1920s, the company operated manufacturing facilities in five cities.

The instruments were primarily sold door-to-door by travelling musical salesmen from the early 1880s until 1965. The company often employed current events as a marketing strategy. Each year, the company would offer new "special editions" of its products linked to newsworthy events likely to appeal to the sympathy of customers the salesforce would encounter. These special editions would include a small dedication commemorating the event and sheet music also written to commemorate the event. The company's salesmen kept detailed records of the buying habits of customers, and the selection of special editions was made annually with the intent to sell additional instruments to existing customers.

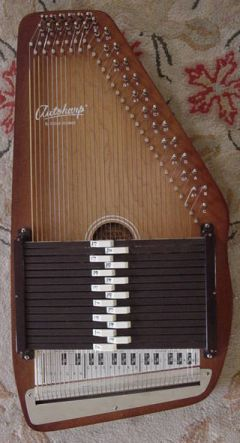
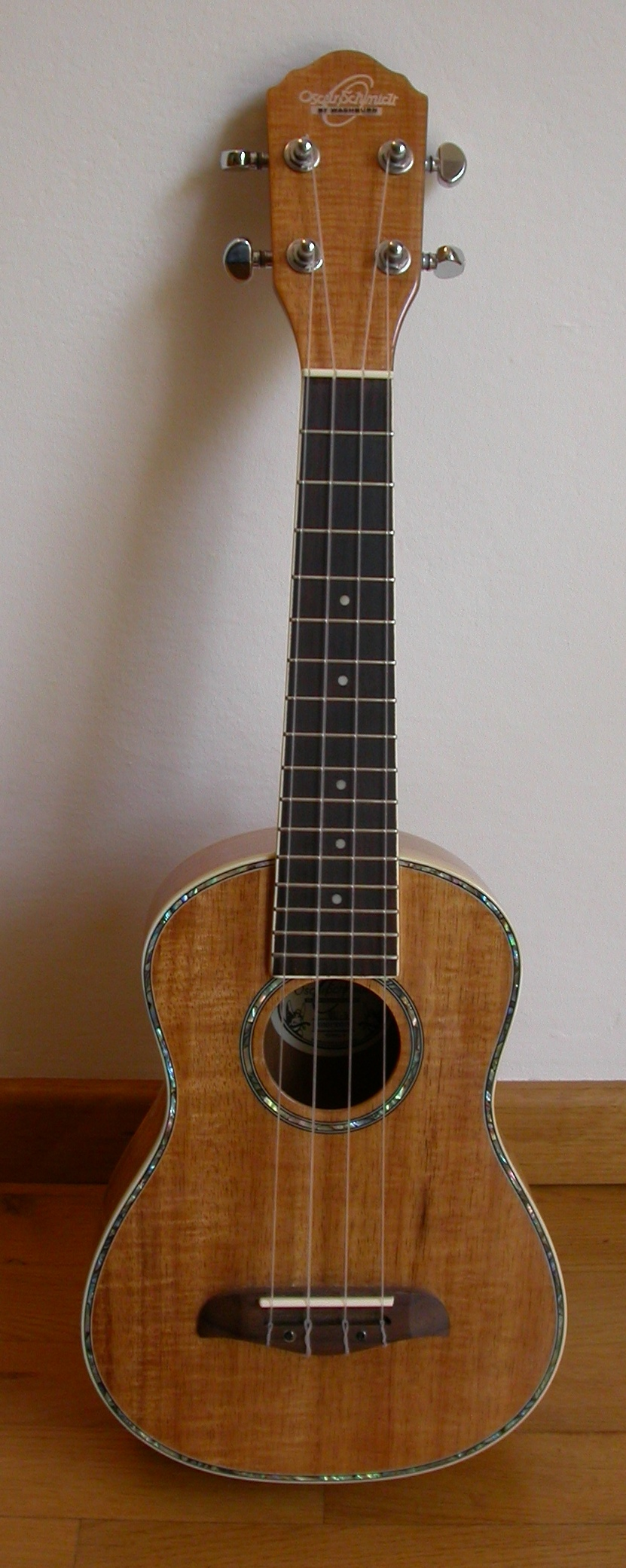
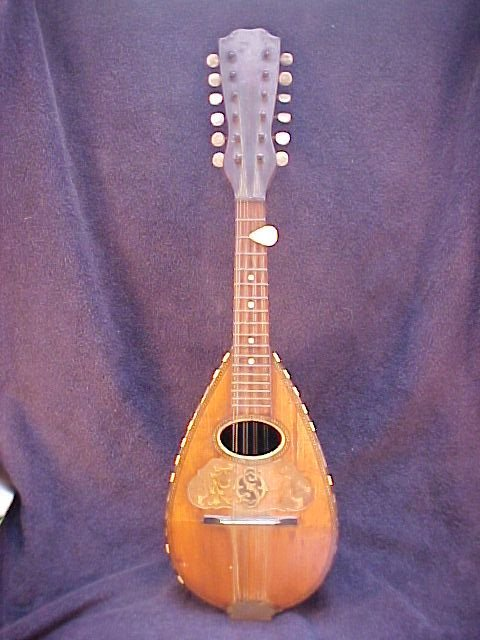
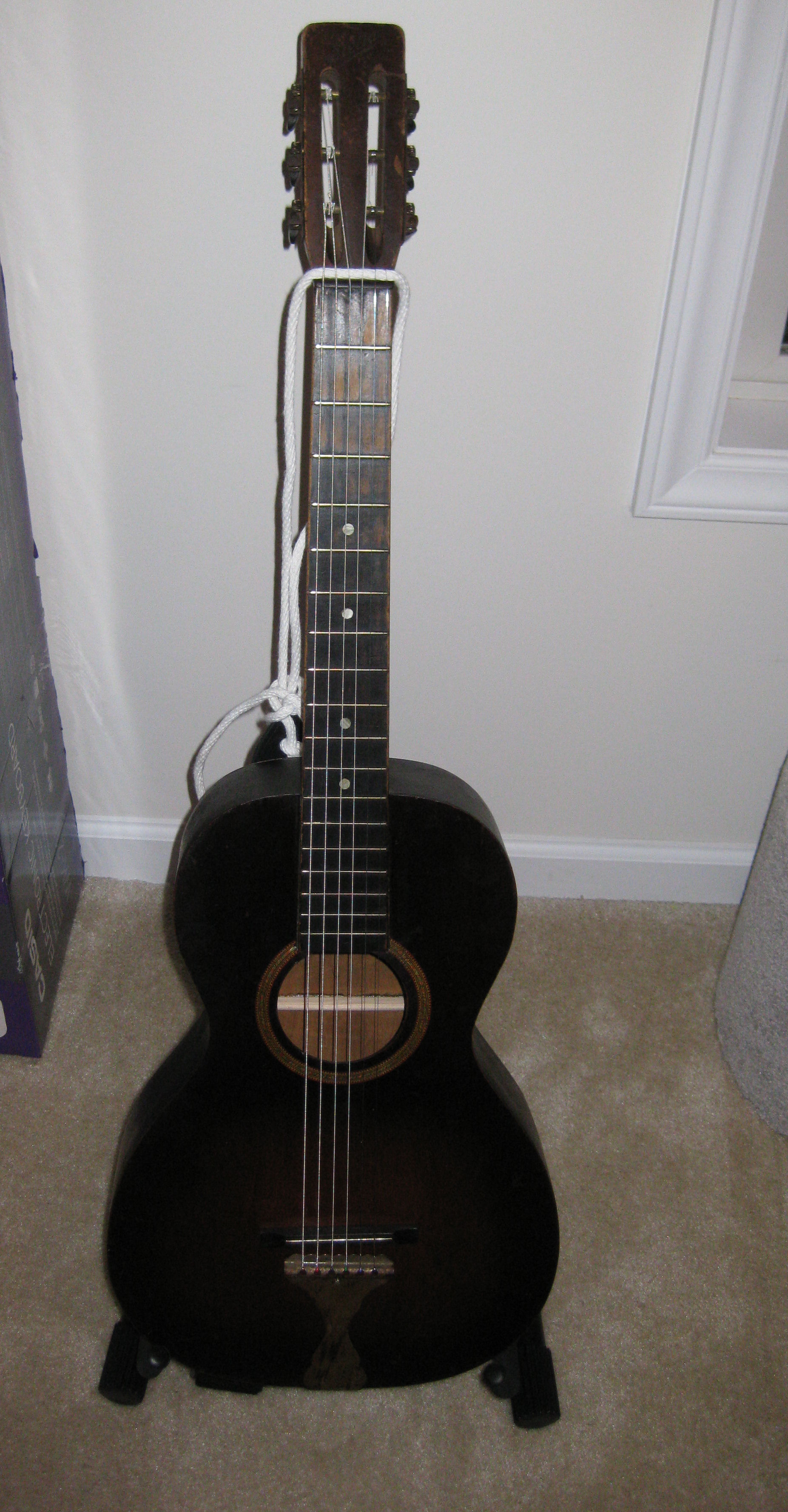
Autoharp, ukulele OU5, mandriola, 1930s Stella parlor guitar

The company continued to thrive and manufactured a large array of string instruments, with over 150 instruments exhibited at the 1926 Music Convention. The company also operated a wide number of guitar brands such as Stella, Sovereign, La Scala, Oahu, Bruno, Galiano, Miami, Reliance, Bluebird, Collegiate, Avalon, Marcia, Lyra, Victoria and Jewel, all the instruments manufactured by Schmidt.

The company's instruments were intended to be relatively easy to play for amateurs. Oscar Schmidt designed small, portable, durable instruments intended to be easy to learn, and useful for family entertainment in the decades between the Civil War and the emergence of radio and later television.

The company struggled during the early 1930s —following the death of Oscar Schmidt in 1929—and was finally dissolved on May 18, 1937. However, in October 1936 just prior to the company's dissolution, a new company had been formed—Oscar Schmidt-International Inc.—which thrived until the spring of 1978 when falling under Chapter 11 control it was purchased by the owners of Fretted Industries Inc., later renamed Washburn International.
