= J. C. Deagan, Inc. =

American musical instrument manufacturer (1880–1977)

Coordinates: 41.9578964°N 87.6733299°W

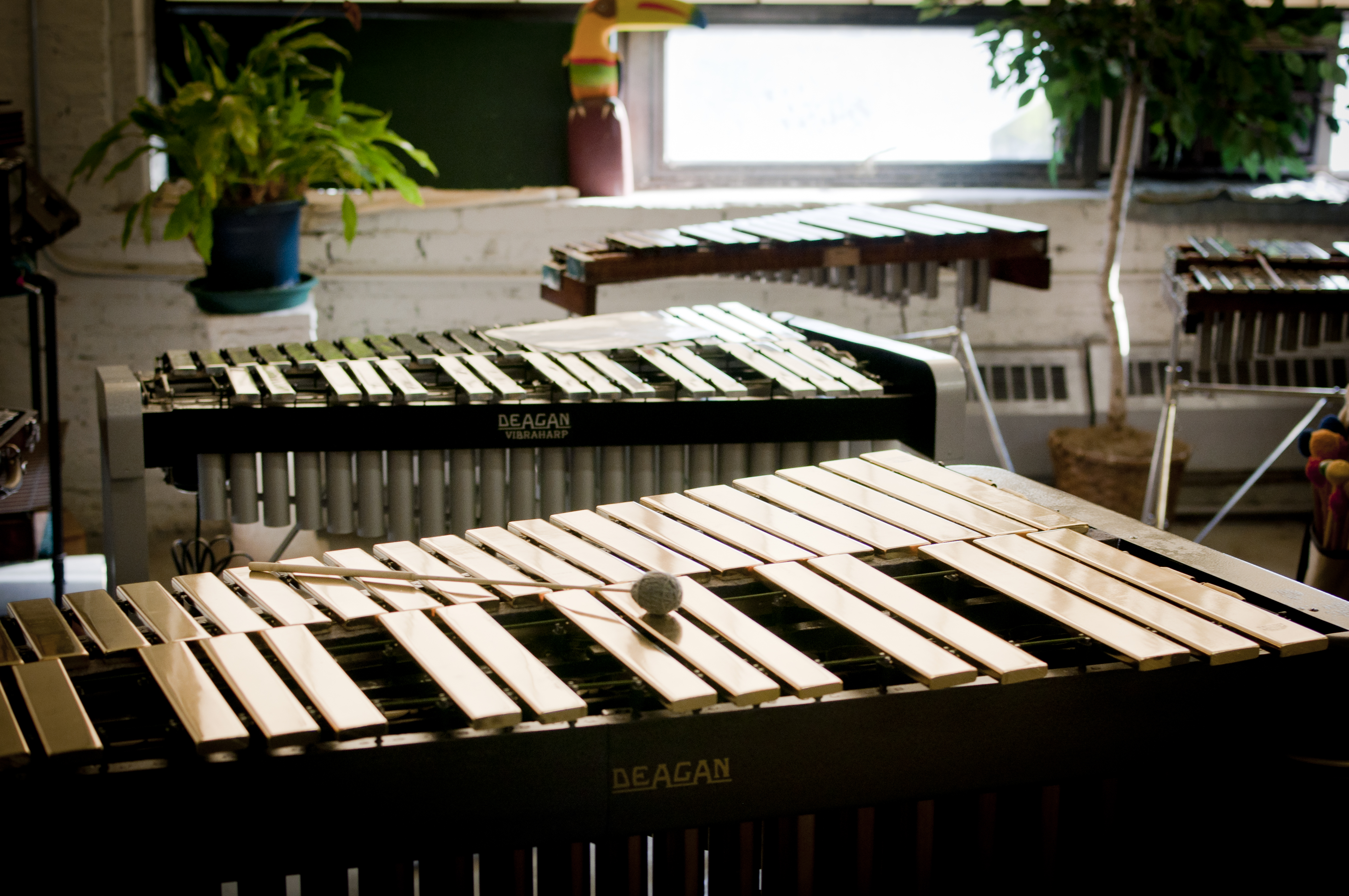
- Two vibraharps displayed at Century Mallet in Chicago, Illinois
- Formerly: List: J. C. Deagan Musical Bells, Inc. (1880-1894); J. C. Deagan Musical Bells (1894–1916); J. C. Deagan Musical Bells, Inc. (1916–19); J. C. Deagan, Inc. (1916–77); J. C. Deagan Div. Slingerland Drum Co. (1977–84)
- Type: Private (1880–1977); Brand (1977–present)
- Industry: Musical instruments
- Founded: 1880
- Founder: John Calhoun Deagan
- Headquarters: 1770 W Berteau Avenue, Chicago, Illinois, United States
- Parent: Slingerland (1977–84); Yamaha Corporation (1984–present)

J. C. Deagan, Inc. is a former musical instrument manufacturing company that developed and produced instruments from the late 19th- to mid-20th century. It was founded in 1880 by John Calhoun Deagan and initially manufactured glockenspiels. It was noted for its development of the xylophone, vibraphone, organ chimes, aluminum chimes, aluminum harp, Swiss handbells, the marimba, orchestra bells, and marimbaphone.

Church bells were revolutionized by Deagan through his design of tubular bells, and the NBC chimes were Deagan's creation. Railroad passengers were summoned to the dining car with "G-E-C" played on a Deagan chime.

The brand name ultimately was acquired by Yamaha, in 1984, and they distribute and sell products with the Deagan name. The tower of the former headquarters, still bearing the company name, is a landmark in the Ravenswood neighborhood of Chicago, Illinois.

== History ==
The company was founded by John Calhoun Deagan (1853–1934), a professional clarinetist, in 1880. The J. C. Deagan company originally headquartered in St. Louis, Missouri, until it moved to Chicago, Illinois, in the early 20th century. Deagan was unsatisfied with the intonation of the glockenspiels used in theater orchestras, with which he had performed. He experimented with the instrument's acoustics and tuning, and developed the first "scientifically tuned" glockenspiel. On the Sensations of Tone by German physician and physicist Hermann von Helmholtz was a strong influence on Deagan's advances. The company remained in the control of Deagan's descendants for two generations beyond.

In 1975 the tower chime and carillon division was sold to Verdin.

In 1977 the remainder of the Deagan company (instruments and mallets) was sold to Slingerland Drum Company, which added the Deagan instruments to its products. Slingerland then sold the Deagan company to the "Sanlar Corporation", a corporation set up by Slingerland accountant Larry Gasp and his wife Sandra, in 1984. Upon Sanlar's bankruptcy in 1986, the Deagan mark and assets were sold to Yamaha.

== Legacy ==
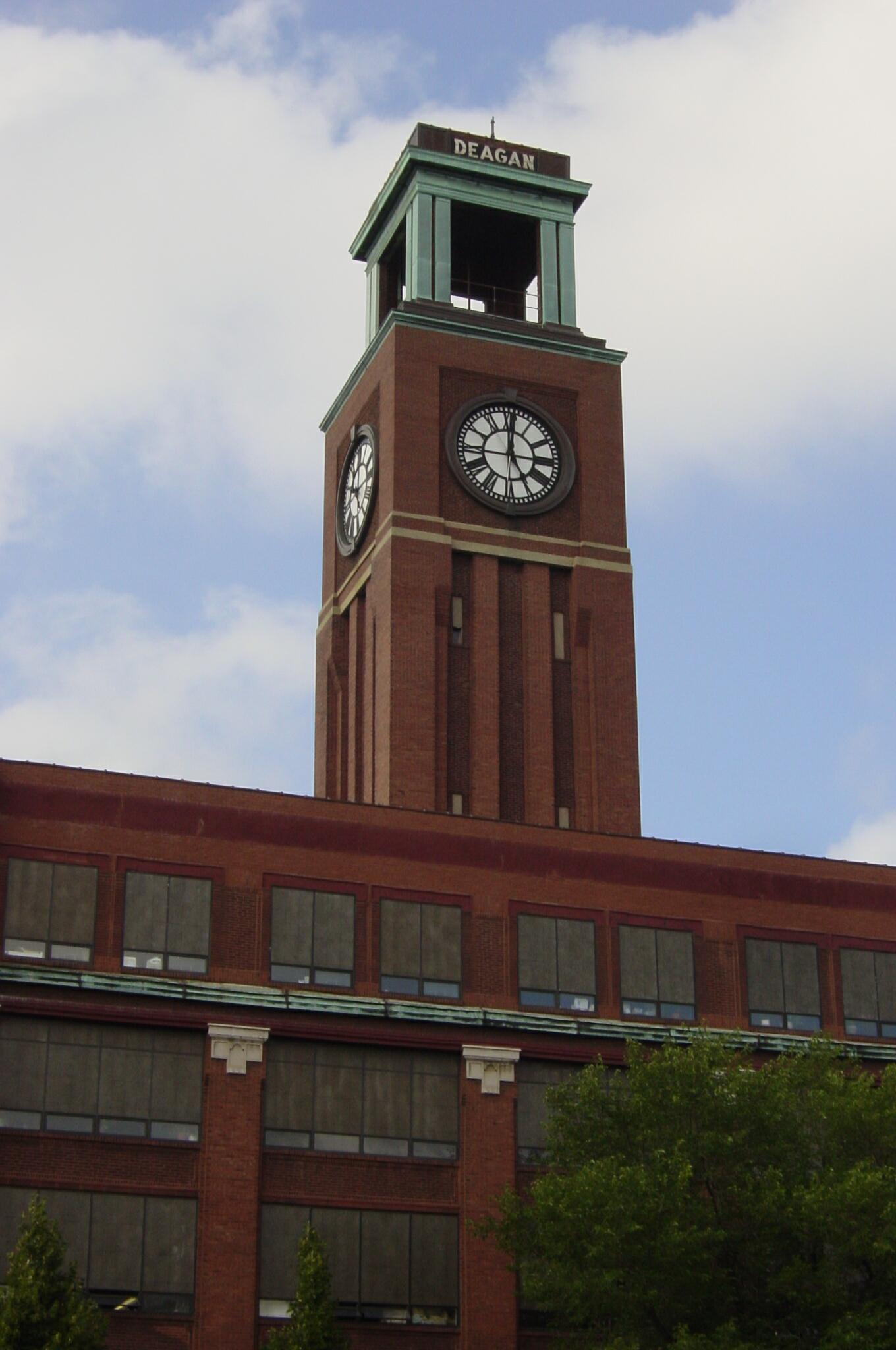
Former headquarters of J.C. Deagan, Inc., photographed in 2007

A 25 tubular bell set by Deagan is still in daily use at St. John Cantius Church of Chicago, using its original player rolls. It was originally at Laureldale Cemetery in Reading, Pennsylvania and relocated to St. John Cantius in 1999.

The 97-bell carillon at the Stephen Foster Folk Culture Center State Park has the most bells of any tubular-bell carillon. It was installed there during the summer of 1958, after first having been installed (with 75 bells) in the Florida exhibit building of the 1939 World's Fair. Deagan craftsmen required more than a year to build the huge set of bells, perhaps the greatest single manufacturing project in the firm's 78-year history.

== Notable employees ==
- Clair Omar Musser, engineer, conductor, and marimba virtuoso
- Henry Schluter, inventor of the Vibraphone
