= Harmony Company =

American guitar company and brand (1892–1975; 2018-)

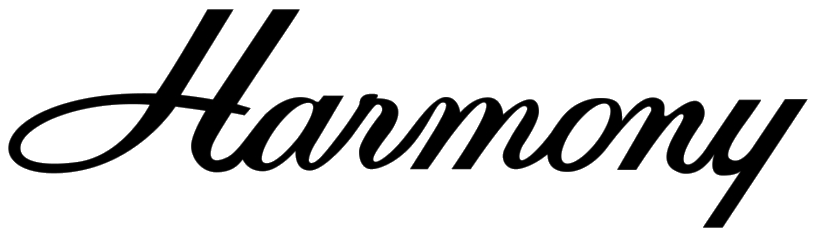
- Company type: Private
- Industry: Musical instrument
- Founded: 1892; 134 years ago
- Founder: Wilhelm Schultz
- Fate: closed in 1975; "Harmony" brand relaunched in 2018
- Headquarters: United States
- Products: Electric guitars and amplifiers; discontinued: Acoustic guitars, ukuleles, violins, banjos
- Owner: Vista Musical Instruments
- Website: harmony.co

The Harmony Company was a guitar manufacturer that has become a brand owned by Singapore-based BandLab Technologies. Harmony was, in its heyday, the largest musical instrument manufacturer in the United States. It made many types of string instruments, including ukuleles, acoustic and electric guitars and violins.

The company closed in 1975, with the "Harmony" brand being relaunched by BandLab in 2018 to produce electric guitars and amplifiers.

== History ==
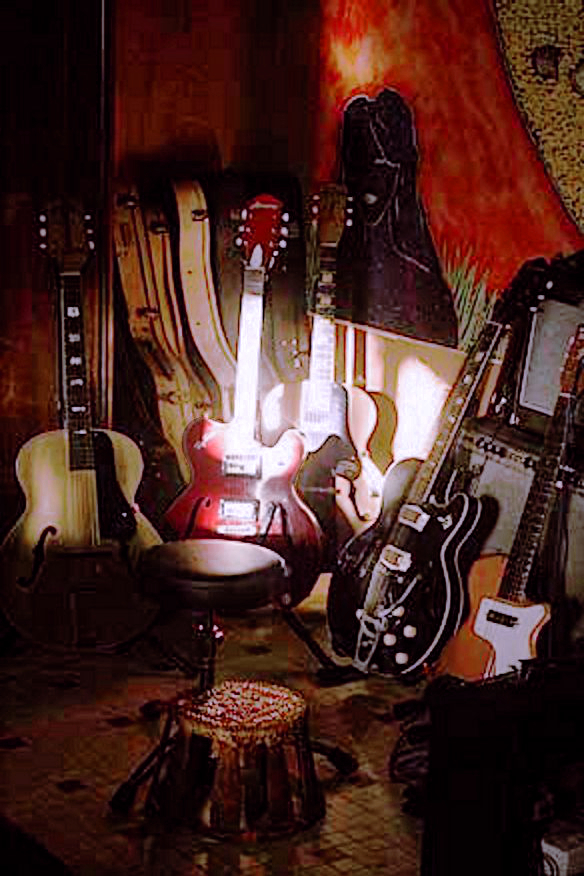
A collection of Harmony guitars: SS Stewart gold acoustic, H73 Roy Smeck, H37 Hollywood, Silvertone 1446, H44 Stratotone

Harmony was founded in 1892 by Wilhelm Schultz. In 1916, Sears, Roebuck and Co. purchased it, in part to corner the ukulele market. At the time Harmony was led by Joe Kraus, who was chairman until 1940.

In 1928, Harmony introduced the first of many Roy Smeck models, and went on to become the largest producer in the U.S. They sold 250,000 pieces in 1923 and 500,000 in 1930, including various models of guitars, banjos, and mandolins.

In the late 1930s, the firm began making violins again after a 19-year hiatus. They also bought brand names from the bankrupt Oscar Schmidt Co.—La Scala, Stella, and Sovereign. They sold not only Harmony products, but instruments under the Sears name, Silvertone, and a variety of trade names—Vogue, Valencia, Johnny Marvin, Monterey, Stella, and others. In 1940, after Kraus had a conflict with management, he left, but then bought enough stock to restart the company independently.

Between 1945 and 1975, the Chicago firm mass-produced about ten million guitars. The company reduced their output over the years, later focusing on student models sold through JCPenney. The Harmony brand peaked in 1964–1965, selling 350,000 instruments, but low-end foreign competition led to the company's demise 10 years later.

The pickups on almost all electric guitars and basses that Harmony produced were manufactured by Rowe Industries Inc. (later known as H.N. Rowe & Company, Rowe DeArmond Inc., and DeArmond Inc.) of Toledo, Ohio. Many of the instrument amplifiers badged with the Harmony name were manufactured by "Sound Projects Company" of Cicero, Illinois.

The Harmony Guitar Company ceased in 1975, and sold the Harmony name. In the early 2000s, an unrelated company, the Westheimer Corp., based in Lake Barrington, Illinois briefly imported "reissue" Harmony guitars.

In 2018, BandLab Technologies claimed to be "relaunching" the Harmony brand with a new series of electric guitars and guitar amps.

Since being bought by BandLab, USA made Harmony Guitars are built in Kalamazoo, Michigan by the Heritage Guitar Company. Heritage Guitars is also owned by BandLab. The brand has since been relaunched with American-made models such as the Rebel and the Jupiter.

== Gallery ==
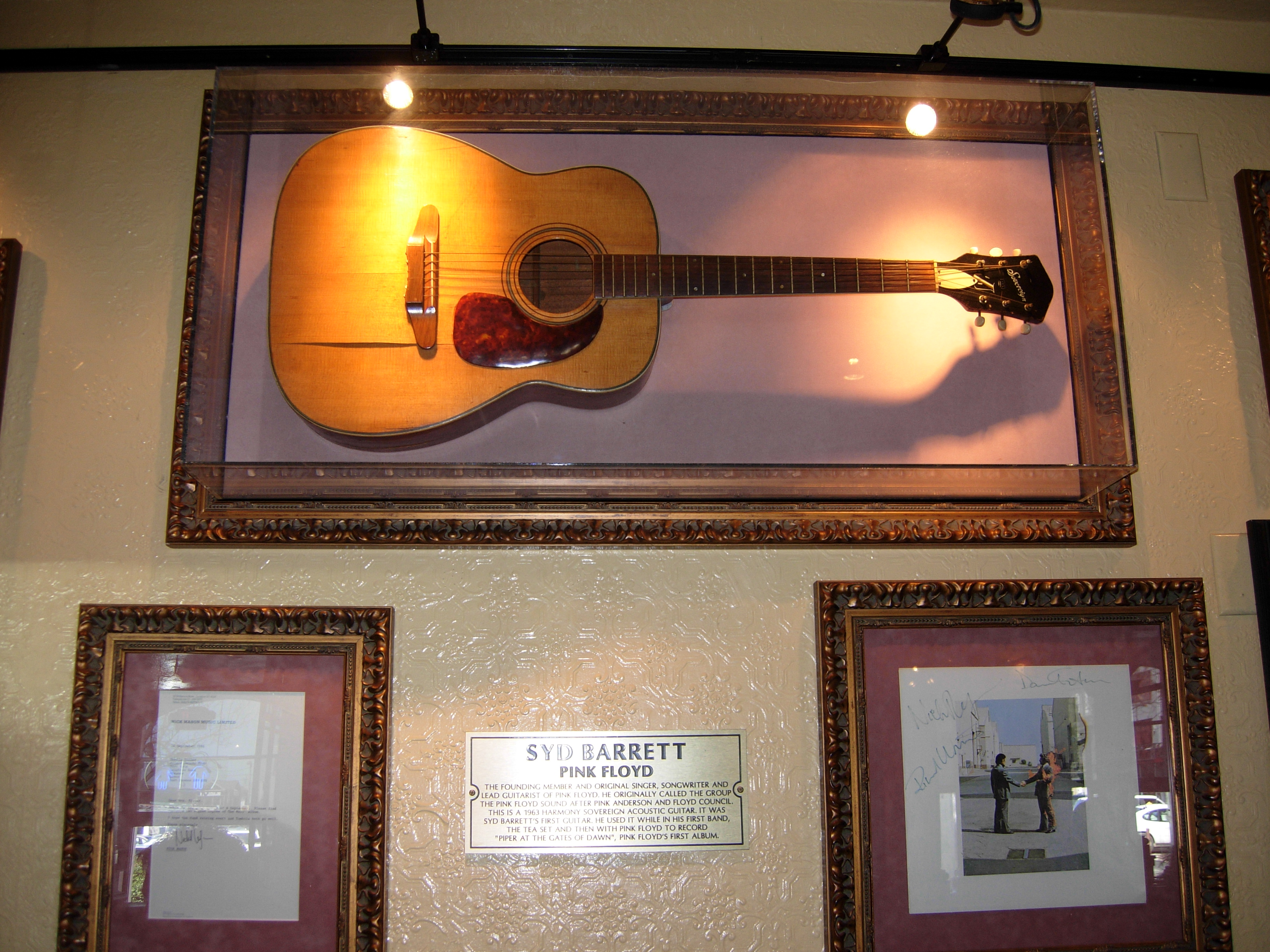
1963 Sovereign
(Syd Barrett's 1st guitar)

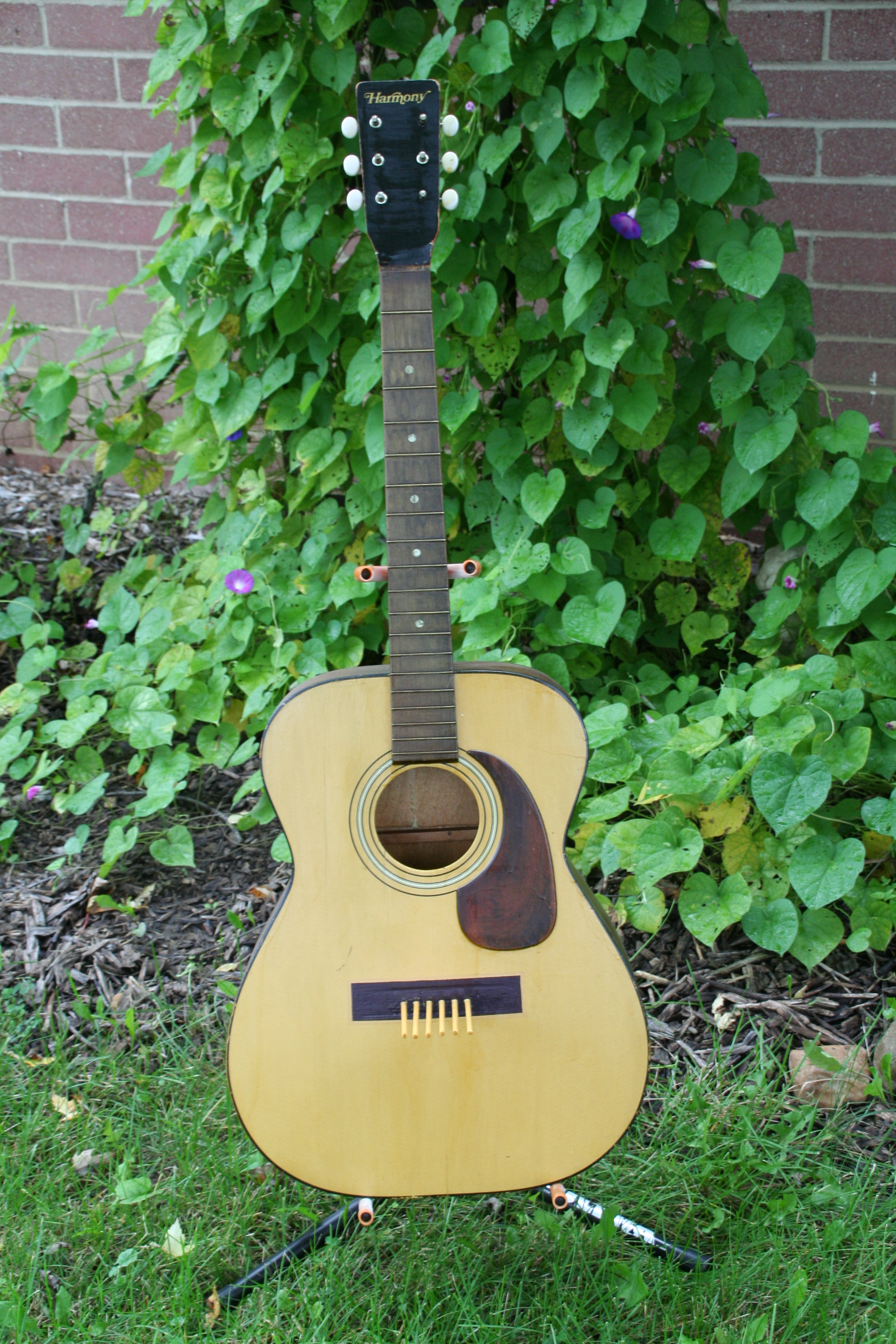
Harmony acoustic

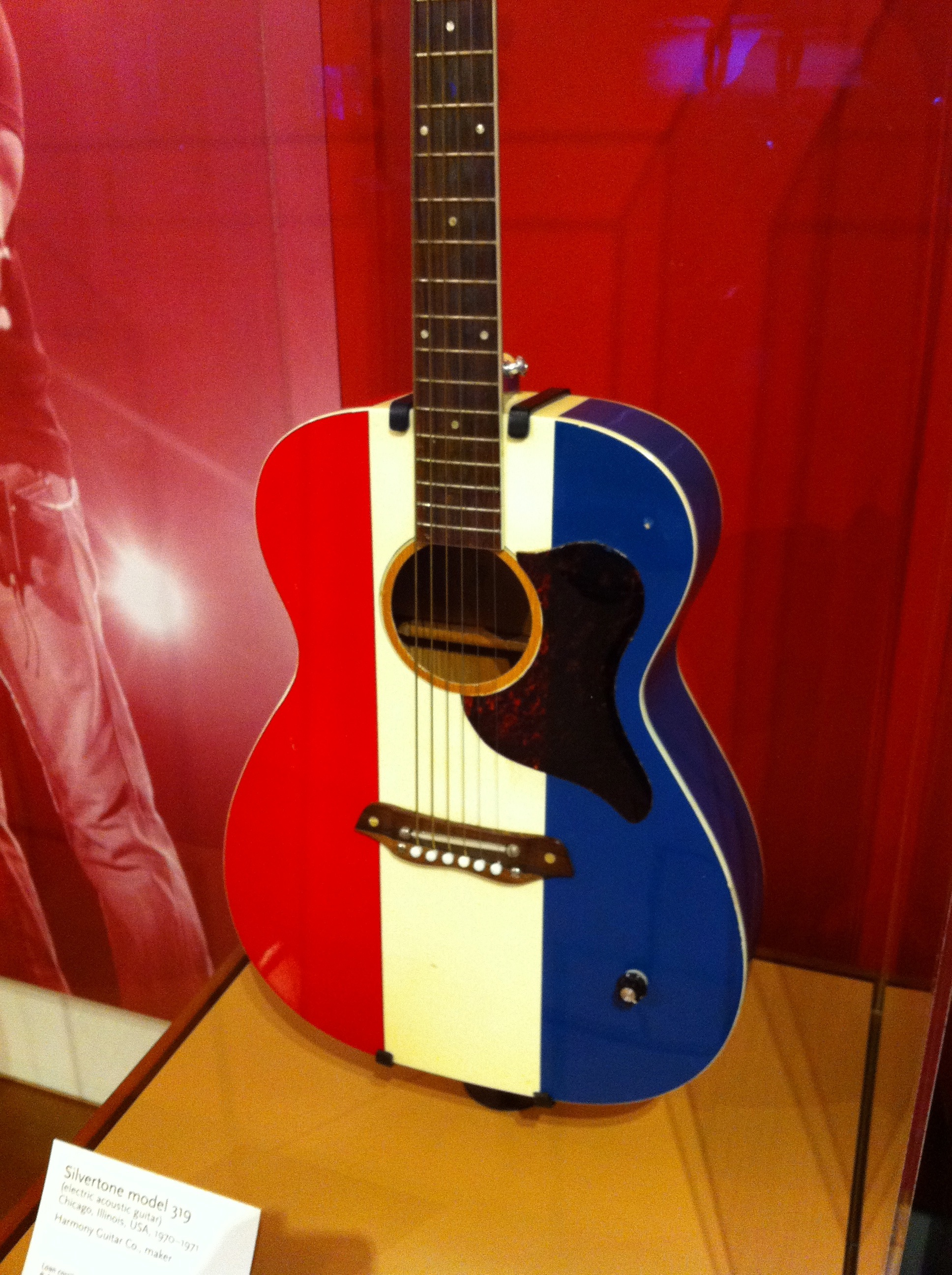
Silvertone model 1219 Buck Owens "American" (1971) by Harmony

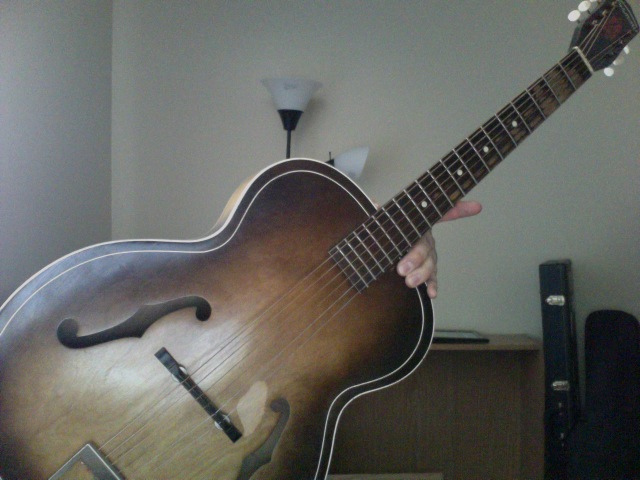
H1213 Archtone (c.1963)

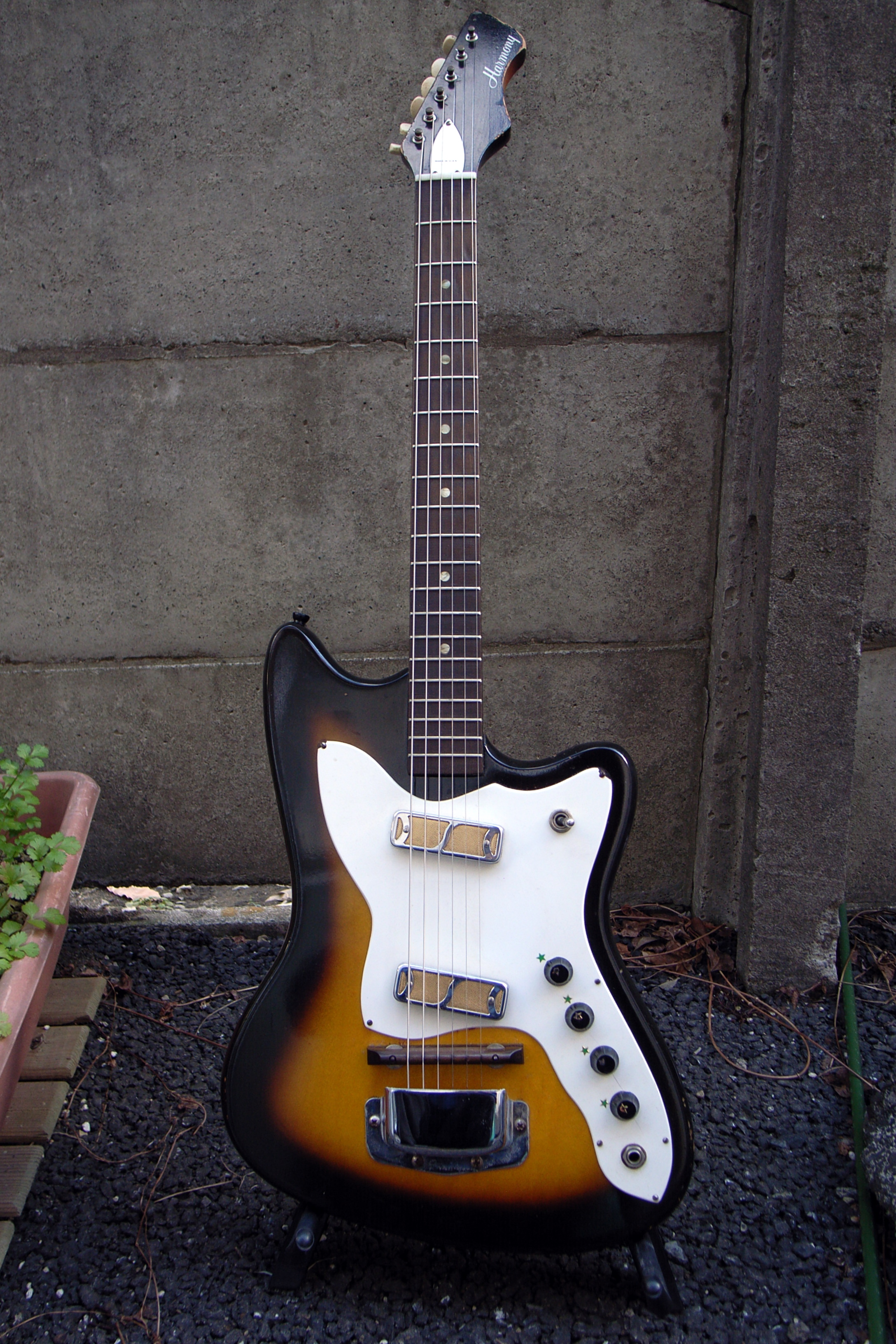
H15 Bobkat

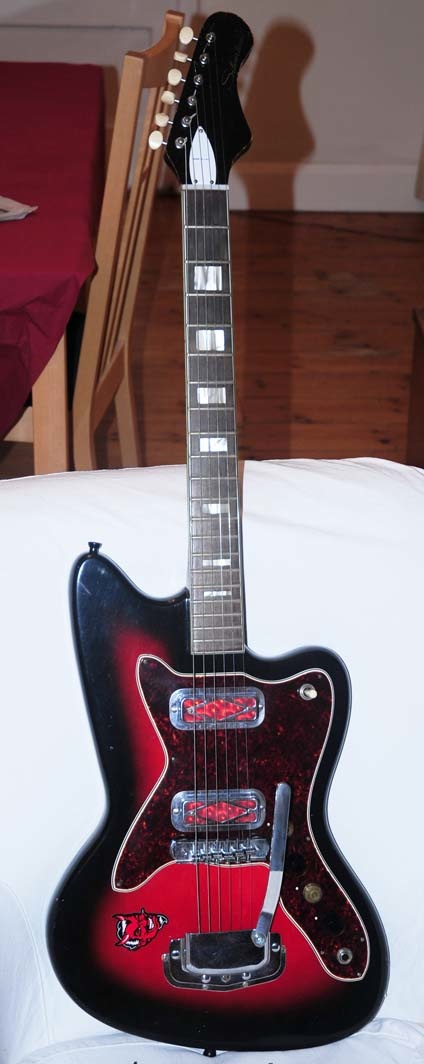
H19 Silhouette
(Silvertone 1480)

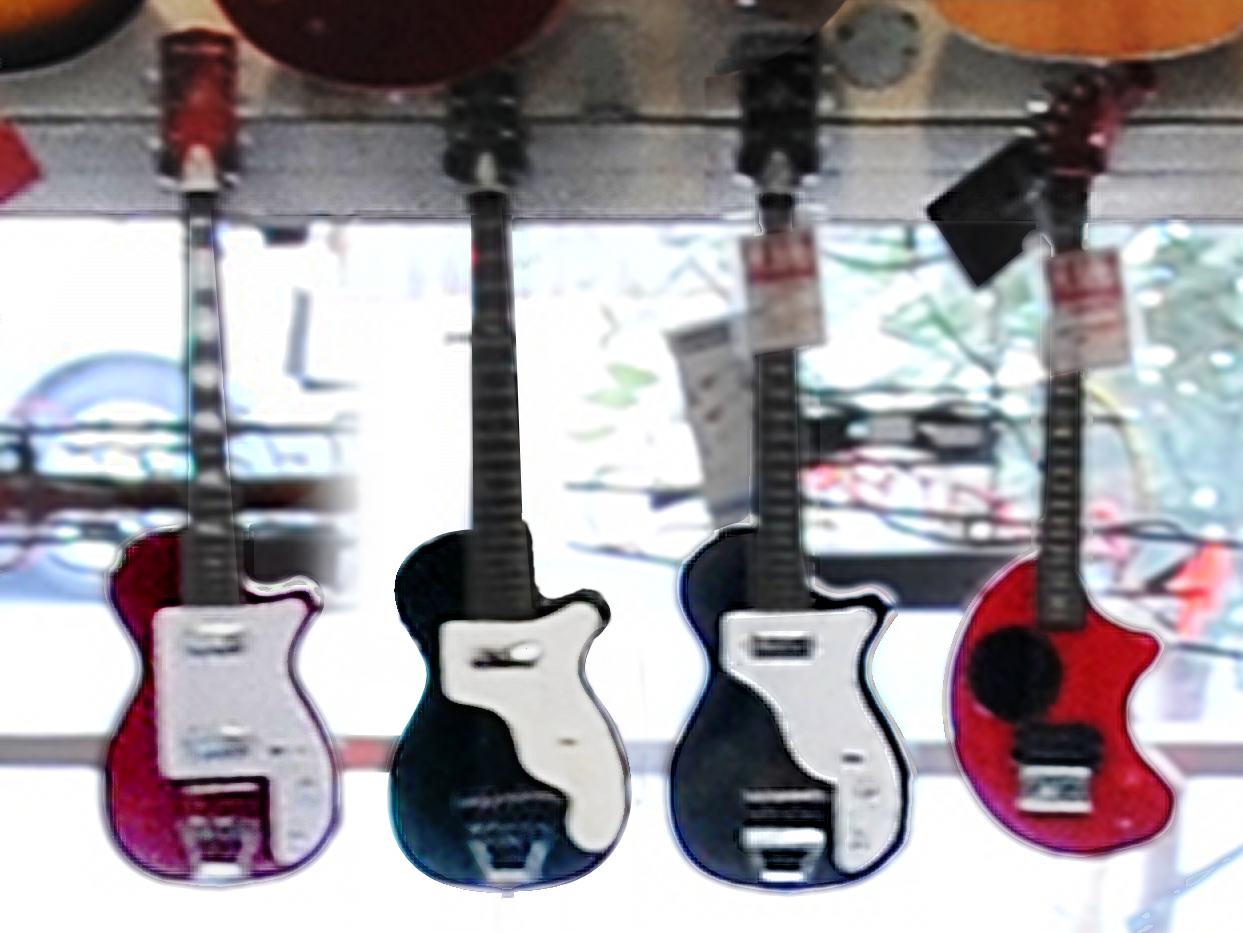
H88, H44 StratoTone, compared with travel guitar

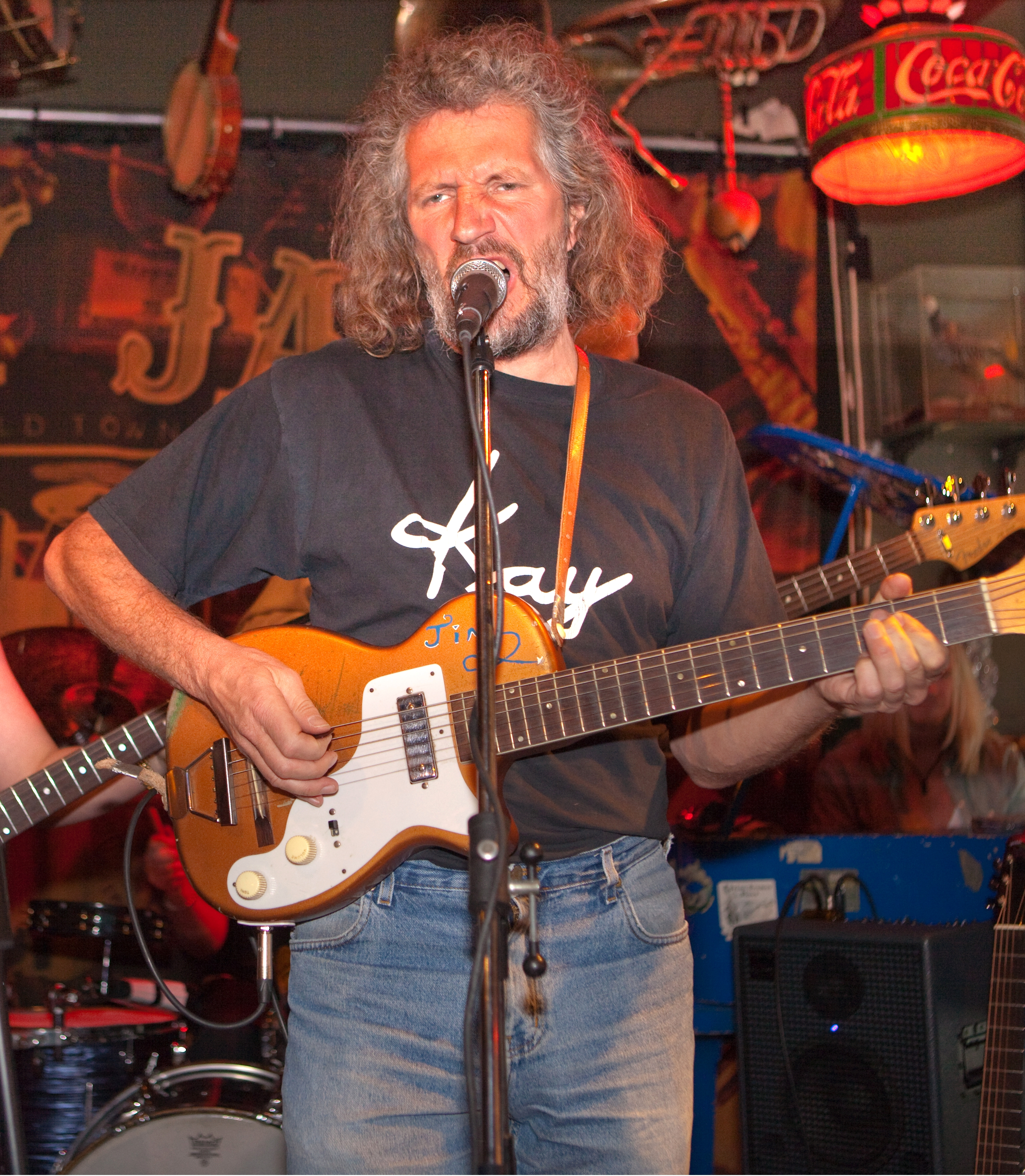
H44 StratoTone (played by Per Ängkvist)

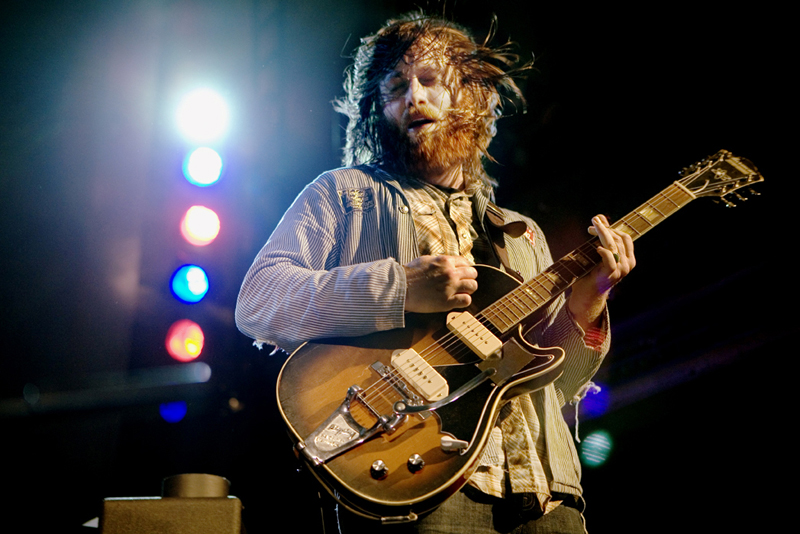
H47 StratoTone, modified by guitar tech of Dan Auerbach

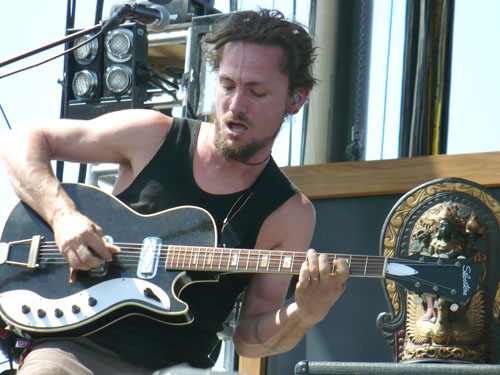
H49 StratoTone Jupiter (Silvertone 1423)

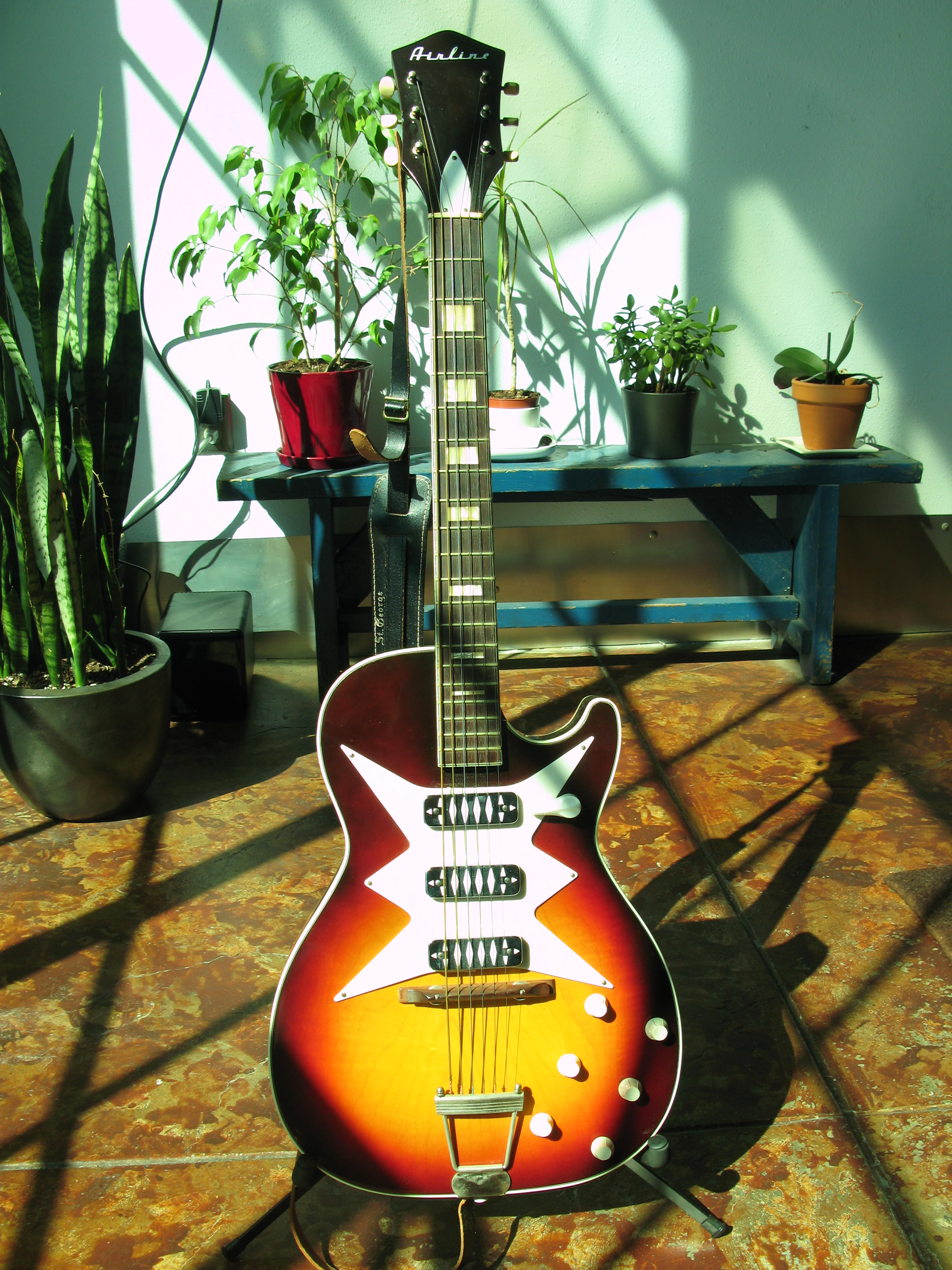
H7208 Roy Smeck StratoTone (Airline Roy Smeck StratoTone)

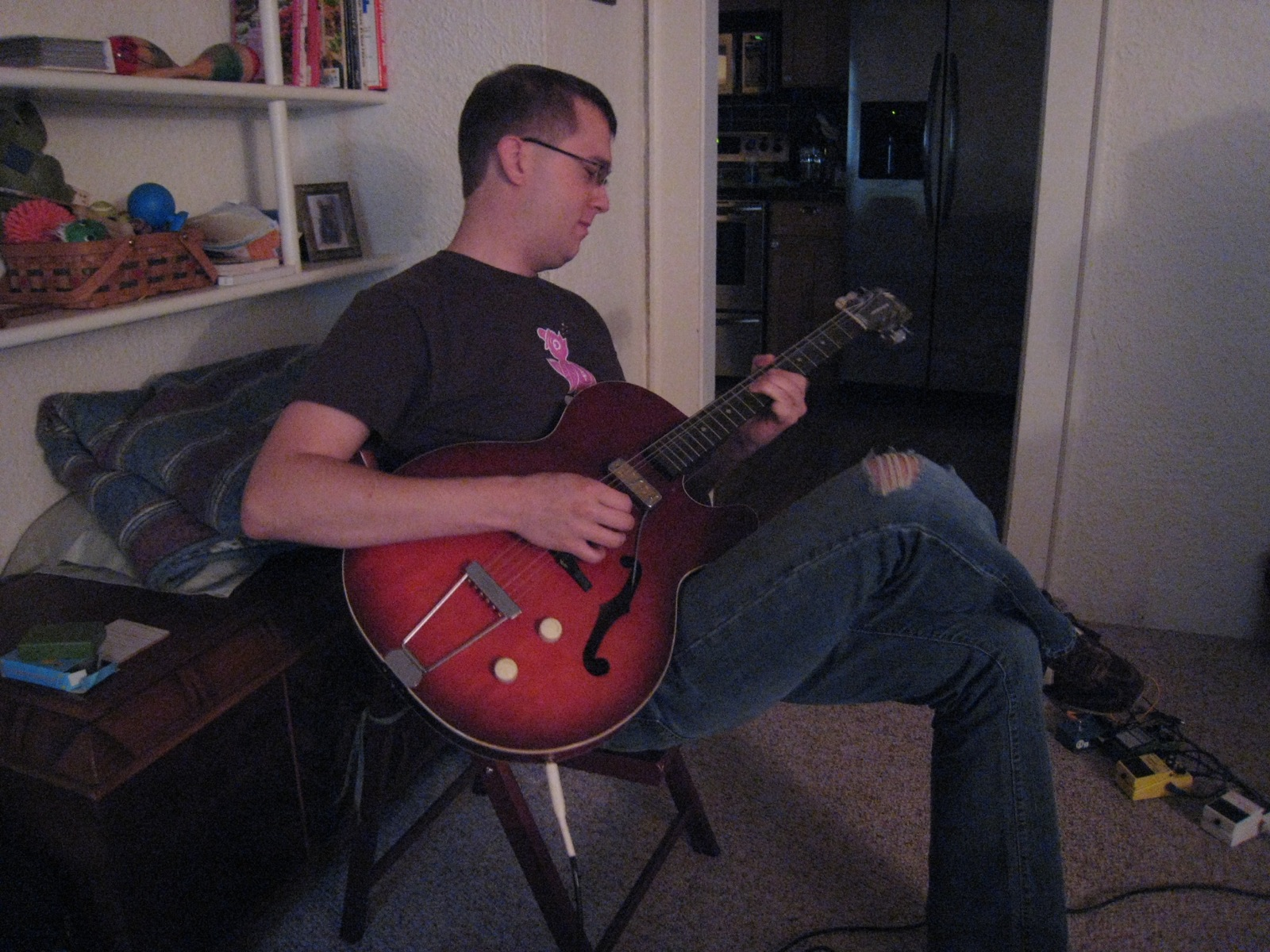
H53 Rocket

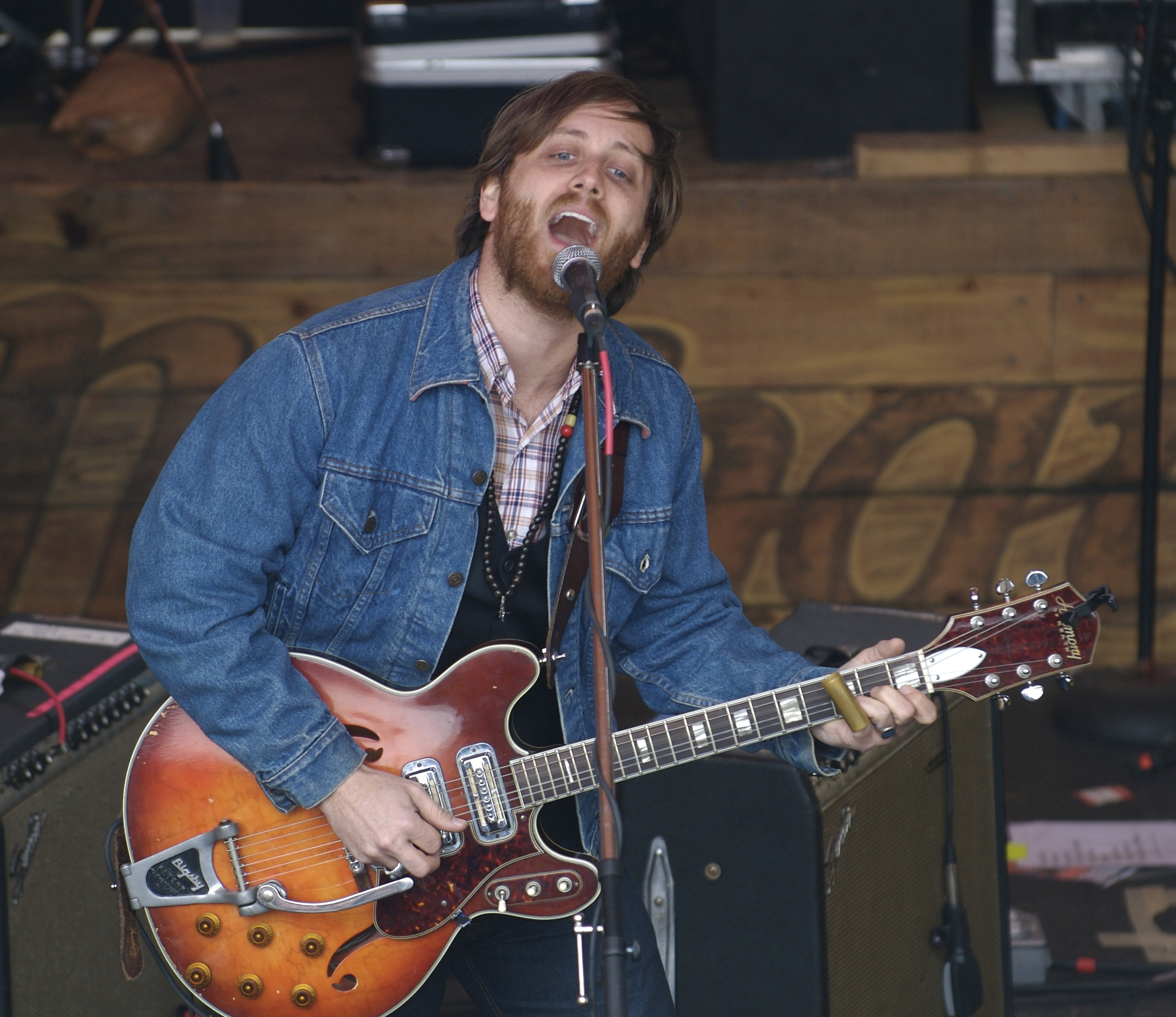
H78 3-pickups with Bigsby

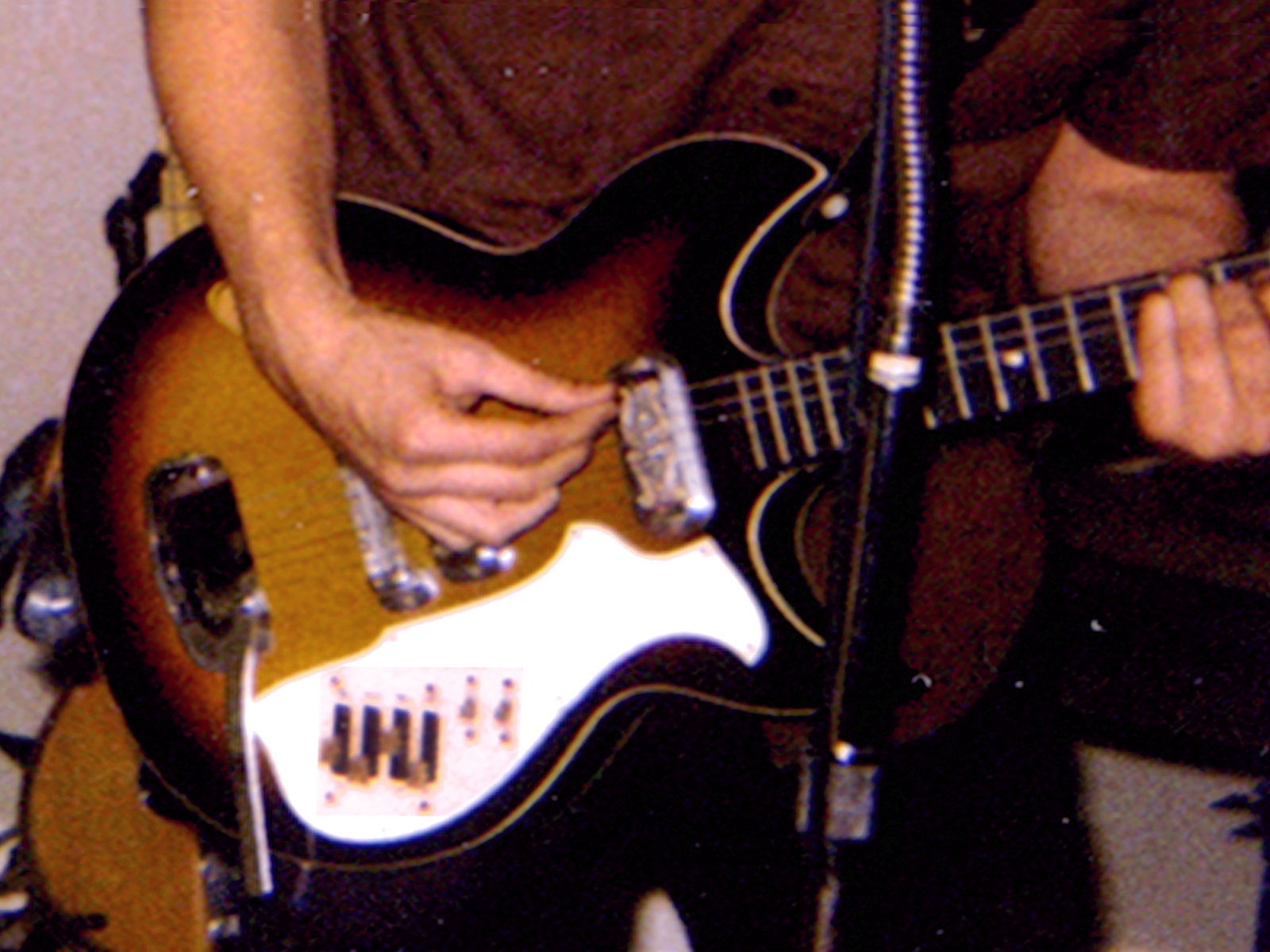
H82 Rebel
