= Stella (guitar) =

Type of guitar from the Oscar Schmidt Company

Stella Guitars
- Type: Private
- Industry: Musical instrument
- Founded: c. 1899
- Founder: Robert Godin
- Defunct: 1974; 52 years ago
- Headquarters: United States
- Area served: Worldwide
- Key people: Robert Godin
- Products: Acoustic guitars
- Parent: Oscar Schmidt Inc. (1899-1939); Harmony Company (1939-1974)

Stella was an American guitar brand owned by the Oscar Schmidt Company. It was founded around 1899. The Stella brand consists of low and mid-level stringed instruments.

Stella guitars were played by notable artists, including Elizabeth Cotten, Robert Johnson, Lead Belly, Charley Patton, Doc Watson and Willie Nelson who learned to play on one. Kurt Cobain of Nirvana played an acoustic Stella for the recordings of the songs "Polly" and "Something In The Way" from the Nevermind album, and Mason Williams with Classical Gas.

Stella was acquired by the Harmony Company in 1939. The brand was dissolved in 1974, and was later reintroduced by M.B.T. International, which is the corporate parent of the Harmony Company.

== History ==
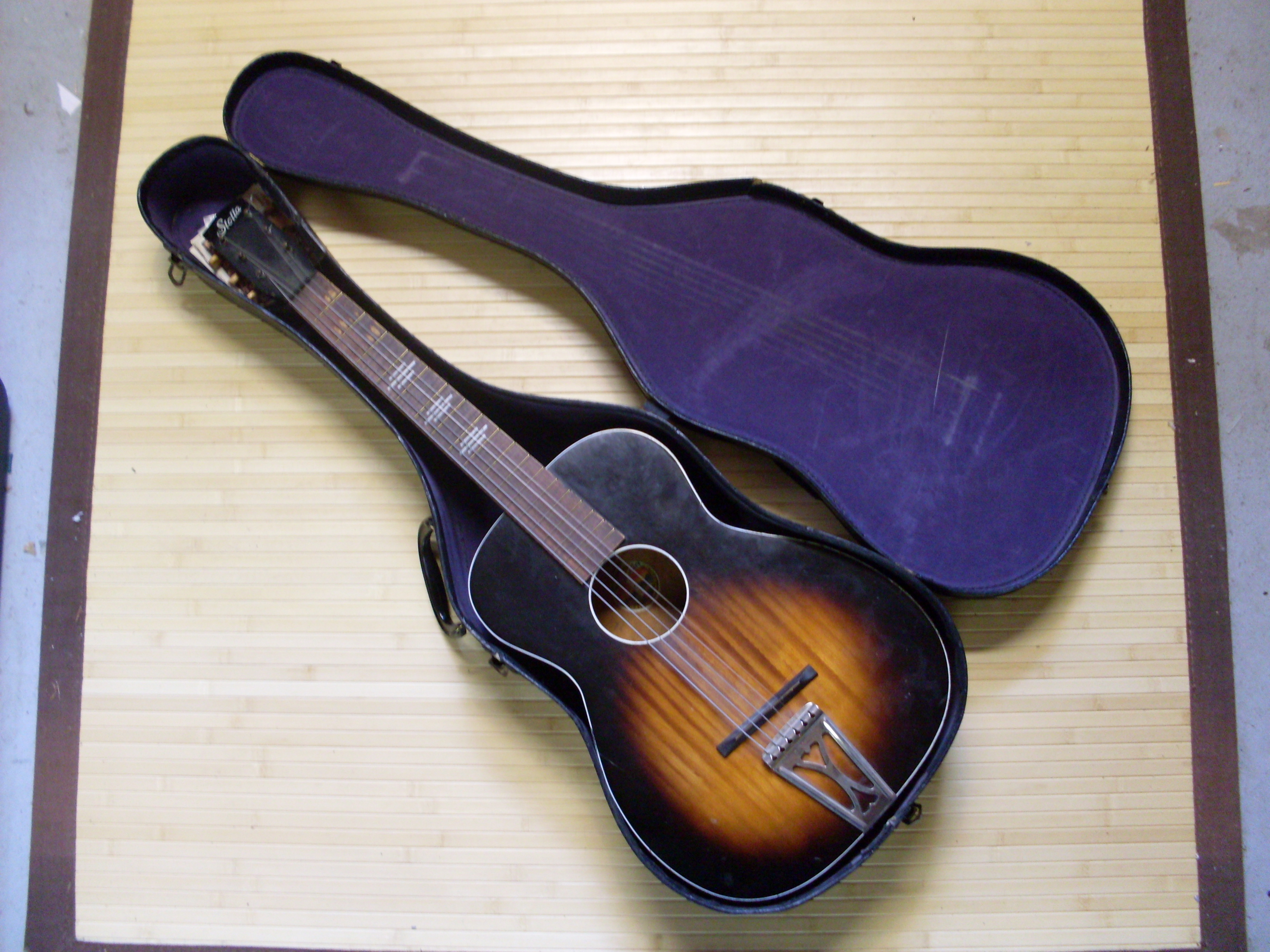
Stella guitar in its case

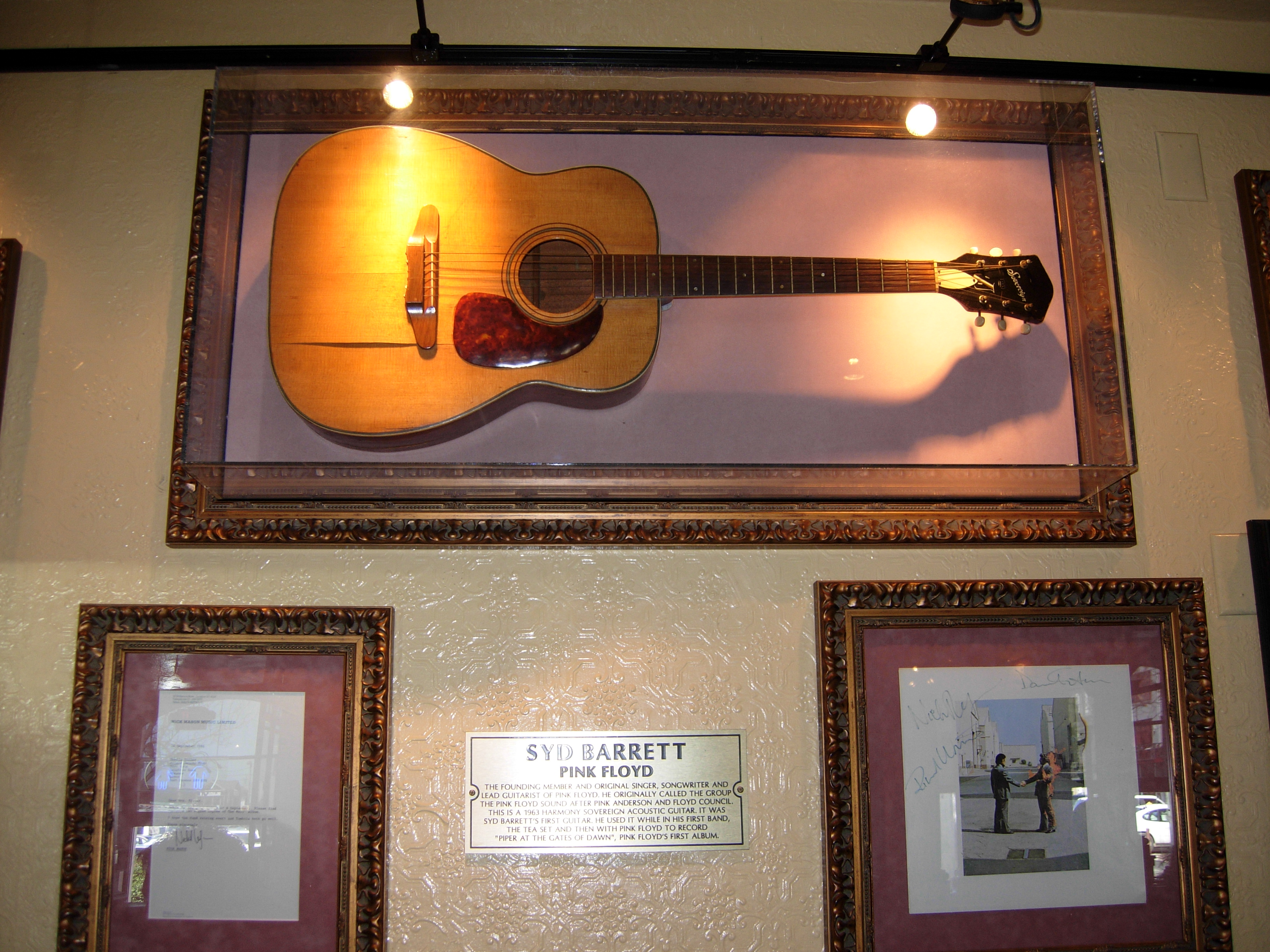
Sovereign guitar - Syd Barrett's first guitar

Stella was one of several musical instrument brands made in Jersey City, New Jersey, by the Oscar Schmidt Company. Other Schmidt brands included "Sovereign" and "La Scala". The company produced low and mid-level stringed instruments such as guitars, mandolins, banjos and autoharps.

The company thrived during the first quarter of the 20th century. In 1920, the company was said to be the world's largest manufacturer of stringed instruments. Stella instruments were noted for their good tone and relatively low price. Top-of-the-line Stella and Sovereign guitars cost a fraction of the lowest-end Gibson or C. F. Martin instruments.

After struggling through the Great Depression, the company sold their fretted instrument division in the late 1930s, but continued to make autoharps. Schmidt's Stella, Sovereign and La Scala brands were acquired by the Harmony Company of Chicago, Illinois in 1939. Harmony went on to produce student-grade Stella instruments, as well as mid-level Sovereign guitars and banjos.

== Notable users ==
- Leo Kottke
- Lead Belly
- R.L. Burnside
- Kurt Cobain
- Ben Gibbard
- Michael Hurley
- Skip James
- Robert Johnson
- Jimmy Buffett
- Justin Vernon
- Blind Willie McTell
- Charlie Patton
- Elvis Presley
- Tom Petty
- Doc Watson
- Leon Bridges
- Jesse Edwin Davis
- Mason Williams
- Neal Schon
- Willie Nelson
- Luke Doucet
- Son House
- Willie Brown
- Maybelle Carter
- B.B. King
- Kerry Livgren
- Howlin Wolf
- Mississippi John Hurt
- Hobo Jim
- Muddy Waters
- Jesse Welles

== See also ==
- Oscar Schmidt Inc.
- Harmony Company
