= Harmony Company models =

Musical instruments manufactured by the Harmony Company

The Harmony Company of Illinois, United States, manufactured a wide variety of musical instruments which were popular during most of the 20th century. This article is devoted to documenting these instruments.

== Numbering convention ==
Harmony's model numbers consisted of an 'H' followed by a 2 to 4 digit number. The 'H' stood for the name of the company.

== Model and date stamps ==
Harmony hollow-body instruments were marked with inkstamps within the body of the instrument. A model/batch number of the form nnnnHmmmm where 'nnnn' is a batch number and 'mmmm' is a model number ('6072H950' for example would be an H950 model). They were also date stamped using an 'F' for instruments manufactured during the first half of the year and an 'S' for those built in the second half, and a 2 digit year code. ('F-45' would indicate the instrument was manufactured in the first half of 1945).

== OEM models ==
Harmony was an original equipment manufacturer (OEM) for several other brands, most notably Silvertone. The OEM models were typically very similar to Harmony instruments but with cosmetic differences (e.g., finish color).

Pickups for almost all Harmony electric guitars and basses were manufactured by Rowe Industries in Toledo, Ohio, from the mid 1940s until the closure of Harmony in the mid 1970s.

== Stratotone ==
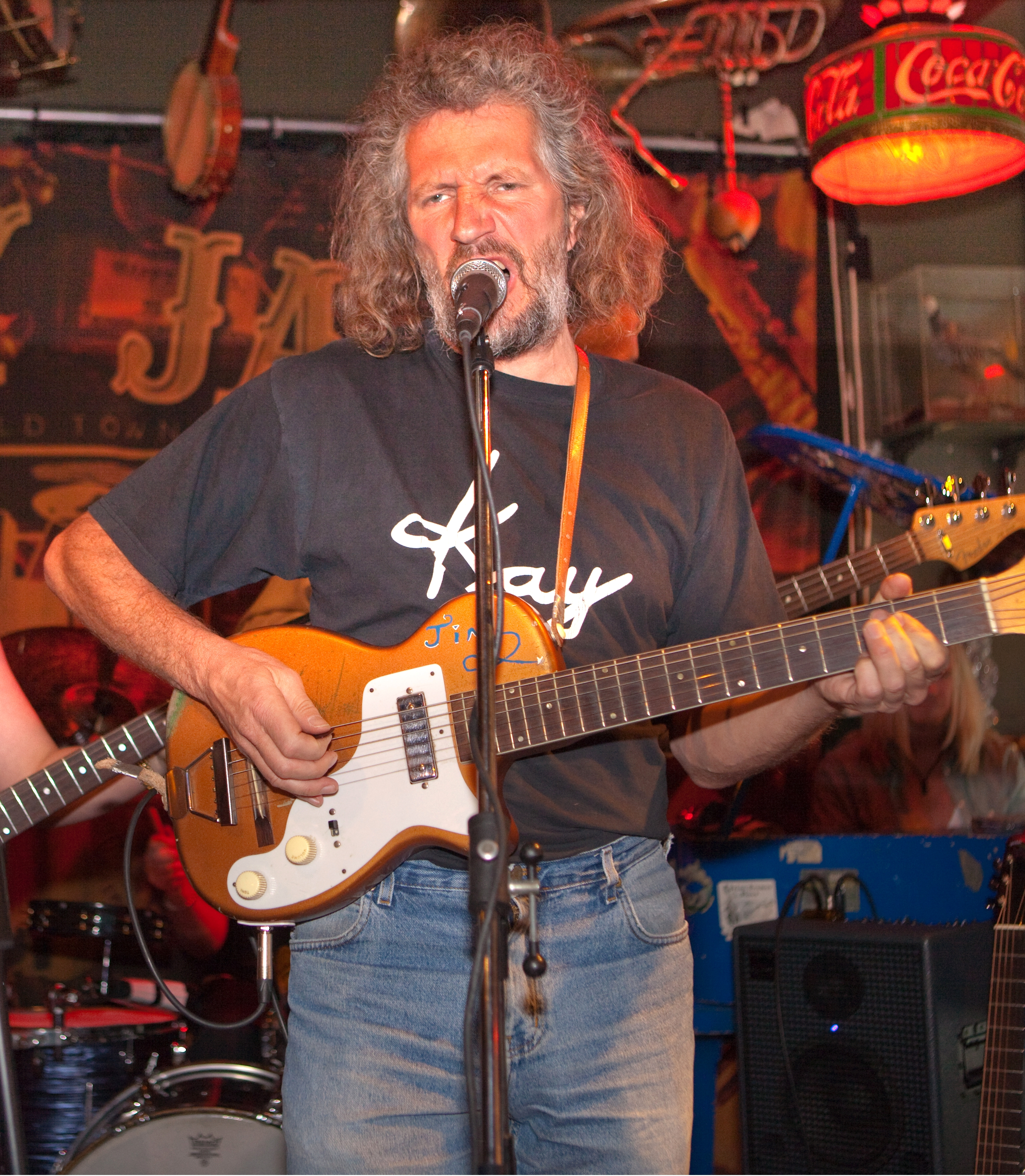
Stratotone H44 played by Per Ängkvist (2011 in Stockholm)

The Stratotone was a commercially successful family of solid body electric guitars which was produced from 1952 on. The headplate was adorned with a note symbol styled as an atom.

The name is a compound of stratosphere and tone. This predates the use of the prefix "strato" in the naming of the Fender Stratocaster by two years.

=== Stratotone H44 ===
The Stratotone H44 was a "thin body" "Spanish electric" (i. e. electric, as opposed to "Hawaiian electric" lap steel guitars) single-cutaway guitar with a "copper-bronze" finish. The single single-coil pickup in a neck position came with tone and volume controls and a switch between "rhythm" and "lead" characteristics. The neck with a rosewood fingerboard is 25 1/4" scale with 20 frets and the heel at the 14.th fret; it is a neck-through design with added "ears" at the body, but without a truss rod. It features a "fixed" (no-vibrato) trapeze tailpiece with a compensating bridge, which wasn't fixed to the body but held in place by the downward pressure of the strings. It was built 1952-7.

A H44 was Ritchie Valens' primary guitar.
