= Stephen Foster Folk Culture Center State Park =

State park in Florida, U.S.

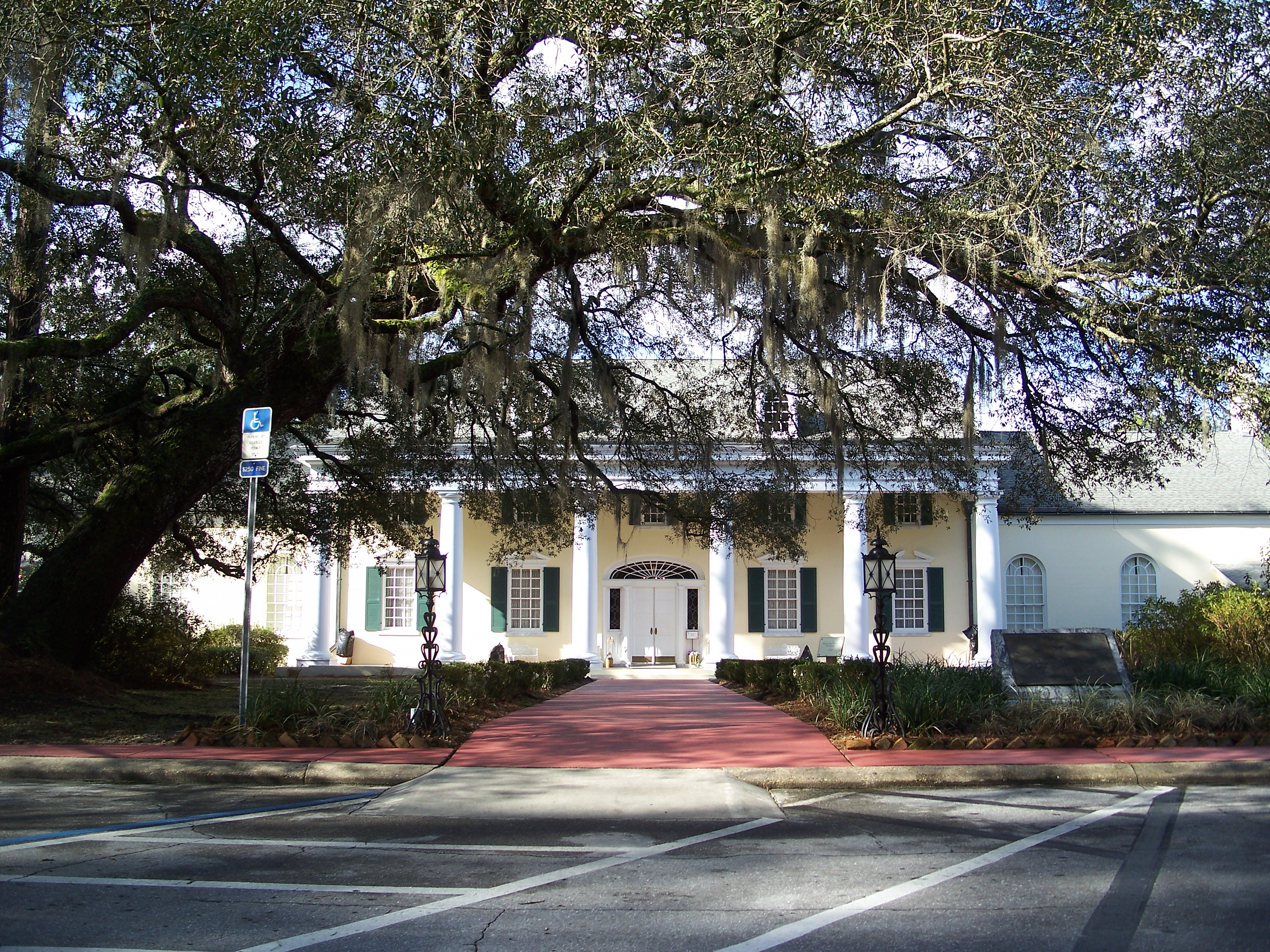
- A view of the front of the museum

- Location within Florida Location within the United States
- Interactive map of Stephen Foster Folk Culture Center State Park
- Location: Hamilton County, Florida, U.S.
- Nearest city: White Springs, Florida
- Coordinates: 30°19′52″N 82°46′01″W
- Established: 1950
- Governing body: Florida Department of Environmental Protection

Stephen Foster Folk Culture Center State Park is a Florida State Park located in White Springs off U.S. 41, along the Suwannee River in north Florida.

Stephen Foster is famous for having written the song "Old Folks At Home", also known as "Way Down Upon the Suwannee River". The song, referring nostalgically to "home far, far away", is Florida's state song.

== Stephen Foster Museum ==
The Stephen Foster Museum honors the accomplishments of American composer Stephen Foster and features dioramas and exhibits about his famous songs, including Old Folks at Home, more commonly known by the words of its first line as "(Way Down Upon the) Swanee River".

Honoring Foster, who never visited Florida, was the idea of Josiah K. Lilly Sr., the son of Eli Lilly. He proposed the memorial in 1931.

== Carillon ==
The carillon was originally constructed by J. C. Deagan, Inc. for the spire of the Florida exhibit building at the 1939 World's Fair. It had 75 bells, weighed 25 t (25,000 kg), and was the largest carillon in the world (by number of bells). It was a gift of Florida's Stephen Foster Memorial Association, who intended to place it at a new Foster memorial building in White Springs after the fair.

The installation in at the Stephen Foster Folk Culture Center State Park didn't occur until the summer of 1958; by which the bell count had increased to 97. More than a year was required by Deagan craftsmen to build the huge set of bells, perhaps the greatest single manufacturing project in the firm’s 78-year history.

The carillon plays Foster's songs throughout the day. A second museum area inside the tower also features exhibits about Stephen Foster and the carillon. The carillon was damaged by an electrical storm in 2017, repairs have begun to restore the bells.

== Gallery ==
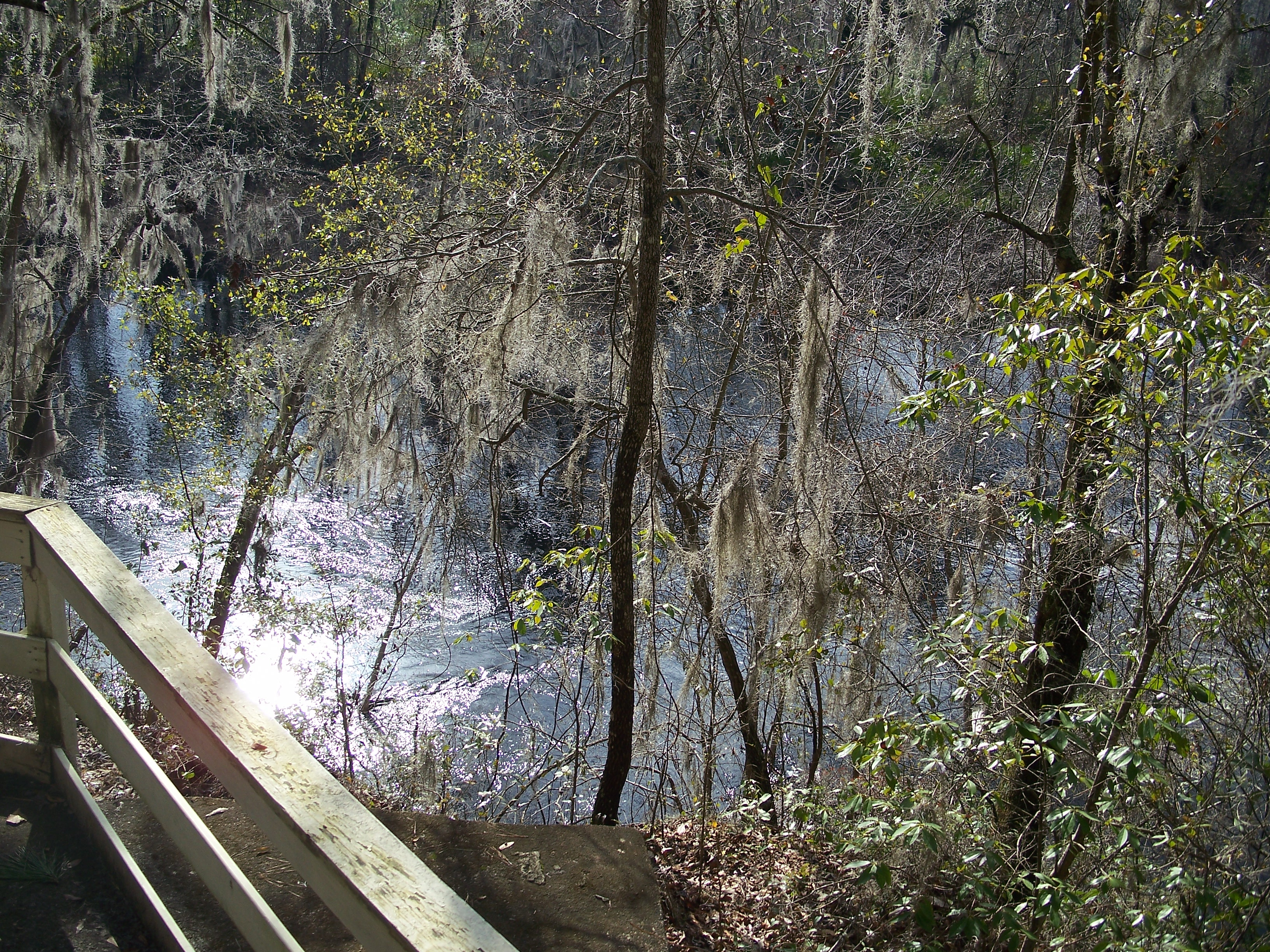
Suwannee River

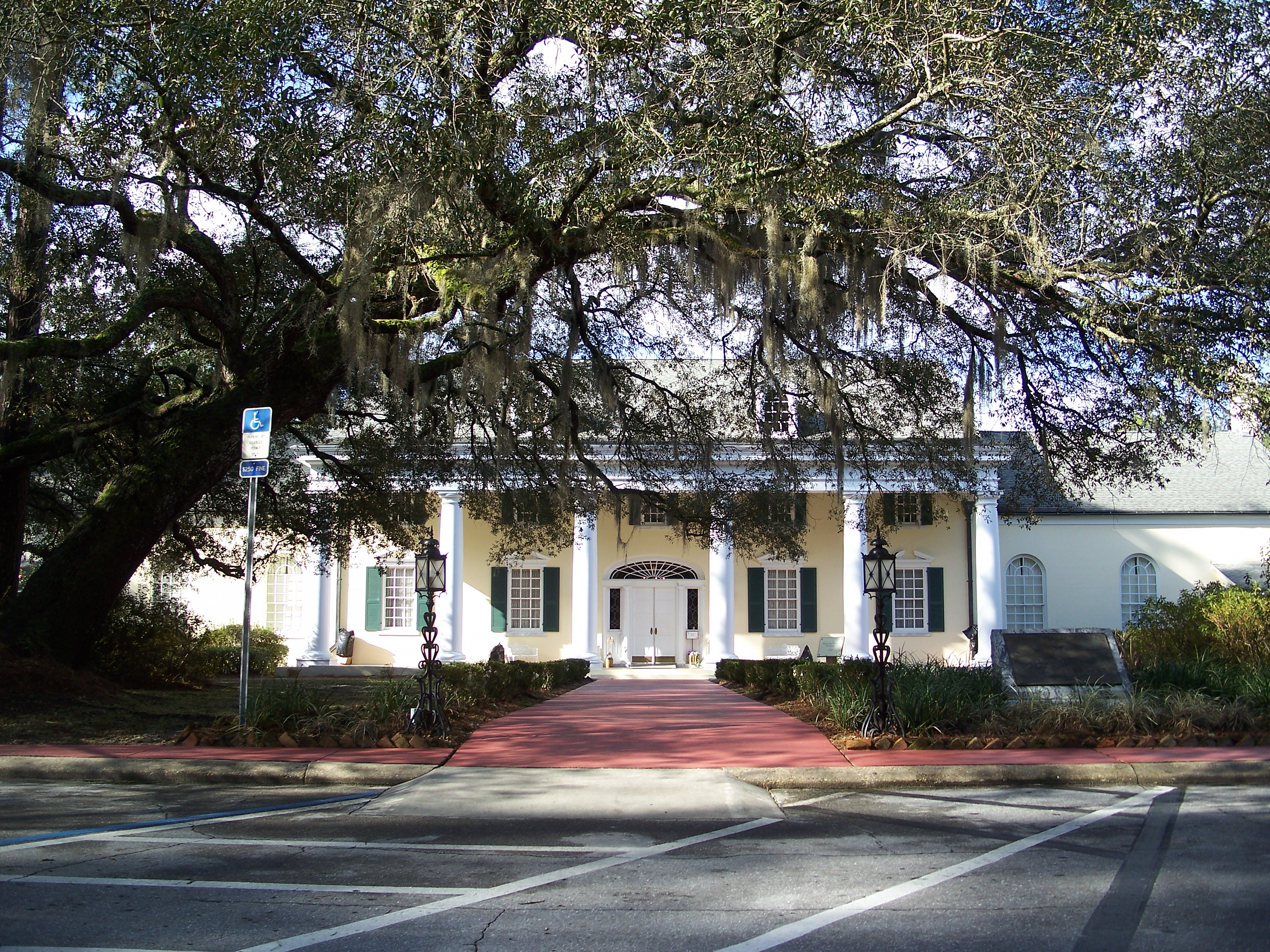
Stephen Foster Museum

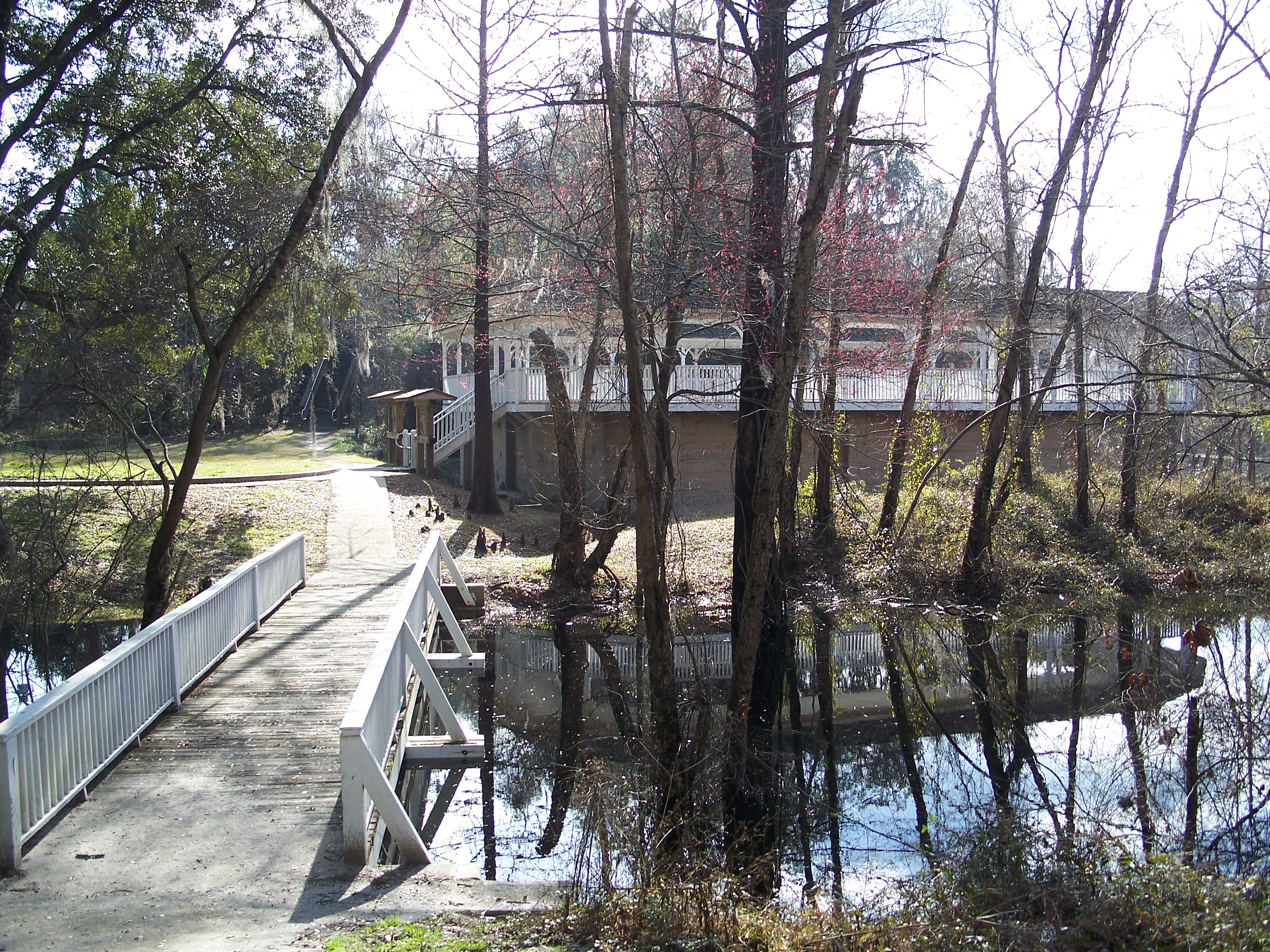
Spring House, from the historic health resort

== See also ==
- List of music museums
