= Phonoharp Company =

American musical instrument manufacturer

The Phonoharp Company (1892–1928) was an American manufacturer of musical instruments based in Boston, Massachusetts. Among the instruments the company was known for was the autoharp, whose design they acquired from Alfred Dolge in 1910; they later merged with Oscar Schmidt (who would become the primary American producers of autoharps) in 1926. The company was also known for producing other instruments, namely the guitar zither, mandolin zither, celestaphone, and the ukelin.

Among its employees who would go on to their own success was Henry Charles Marx, inventor of the Marxophone.
