= Celestaphone (instrument) =

Zither with sprung hammers

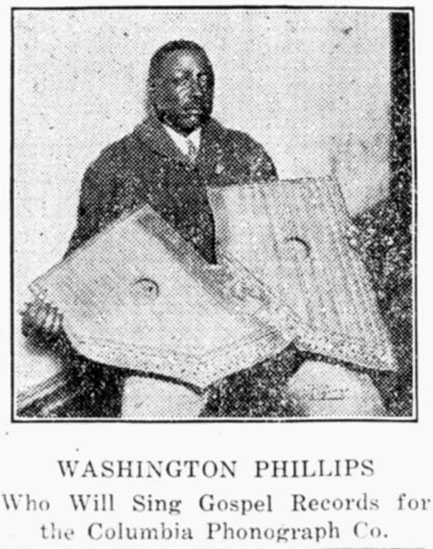

The celestaphone was a musical instrument of the zither family, which was played by pressing spring-levers to cause small hammers to strike the strings of the instrument.

The term celestaphone was also used for a glass-plate xylophone designed by Charles C. Weidman of Ohio State University around the 1930s. Yet another celestaphone was an instrument created by Clair Omar Musser, a glockenspiel-like instrument he constructed over the mid-20th century from meteorites.

== Players ==
The gospel musician Washington Phillips was thought to have played the dolceola on several of his recordings, but he actually played a compound instrument he fashioned out of two East Boston Phonoharp Company celestaphones, but with the hammer-keyboard removed. It consisted of two chord zithers, attached side by side, one of which had four chords, the other of which had five. He played them with his fingers, as other zither players do. Having nine chords to choose from, he also had fifteen courses of melody strings, which he contrived to tune in octaves rather than in unisons, thus giving him the "angelic" sound he was famous for. His sixteen extant sides (available on the Yazoo, Document, Agram and P-Vine labels) were cut between 1927 and 1929 in Dallas, Texas.

== See also ==
- Marxophone, a similar instrument with spring-hammers
