= Clair Omar Musser =

American marimba player (1901–1998)

Clair Omar Musser (1901–1998) was a marimba virtuoso, a conductor and promoter of marimba orchestras, a composer, a teacher, a designer of keyboard percussion instruments, an inventor, and an engineer for Hughes Aircraft.

== Early career ==
Musser was born on October 14, 1901, in Pennsylvania to Ezra Musser and Cora Weidman. He was raised with his brother Willoughby, as a member of the Mennonite Church in Lancaster, Pennsylvania. He died on November 7, 1998, in California, but was interred at the Erisman Mennonite Cemetery in Manheim, Pennsylvania. Omar began to study the xylophone in the 5th grade. Upon witnessing a performance of Teddy Brown playing marimba with the Earl Fuller's Rector Novelty Orchestra, Musser was inspired to study with Brown's former teacher, Philip Rosenweig. Musser soon became recognized as a virtuoso in his own right, performing as a soloist, with orchestras, and in an early Warner Bros. Vitaphone film. Musser joined the J.C. Deagan Company in 1930 as manager of the mallet instrument division.

== Design work ==
Musser's first major project as a designer was a unique instrument called the Marimba-Celeste, built at the J.C. Deagan factory in Chicago. Essentially, the instrument combined a marimba and a vibraphone, with a built-in amplification system for the lower marimba keys. Musser toured with this instrument between 1927 and 1930.

Some time between 1949 and 1950, Musser designed and built a predecessor to the drum machine, alliteratively called the "Musser Maestro Marimba Metron", or more simply the "Rhythm Machine." The machine, used by Musser to accompany performances and lessons, measures 1.5 feet wide and about 3 feet square. Manufactured using vacuum tube technology, it plays 13 electronically generated rhythmic accompaniments such as the bolero, waltz, rhumba, cha-cha, tango, samba, and beguine. In addition to the pre-set loops, percussion sounds can be activated using push-button controls, which show wear from Musser operating them with his mallets while playing.

Musser's final design project was the Celestaphone, an instrument which served to merge Musser's interests in outer space and music. The frame and the bars were forged from 678 pounds of meteorites from Musser's own collection, which he began gathering from all over the world in 1936. In design and appearance it most closely resembles a pedal glockenspiel.

== The Marimba Orchestra ==
One of the most notable of Musser's contributions to the world of percussion is his work as a conductor and promoter of large marimba orchestras. One of the first of such groups was a 25-piece, all-girl marimba ensemble for a Paramount Pictures event in Chicago. In 1933 at the Century of Progress International Exhibition in Chicago, Musser conducted a marimba orchestra of 100 players. A special marimba, the "Century of Progress Model" was designed by Musser and produced by the Deagan company. There was a similar project in 1935 with another special marimba, the "King George Model."The largest group Musser had ever assembled was an ensemble of 300 players appearing at the "Chicago Fair of 1950," though those were "Chicago area boys and girls who had never had a music lesson before July 12. They will have had a maximum of seven weeks of study by concert time" These students, age 7 to 15, had been offered free marimba lessons at various locations in Chicago by the Chicago Park District in cooperation with Northwestern University and Musser.

== Musser Marimbas ==
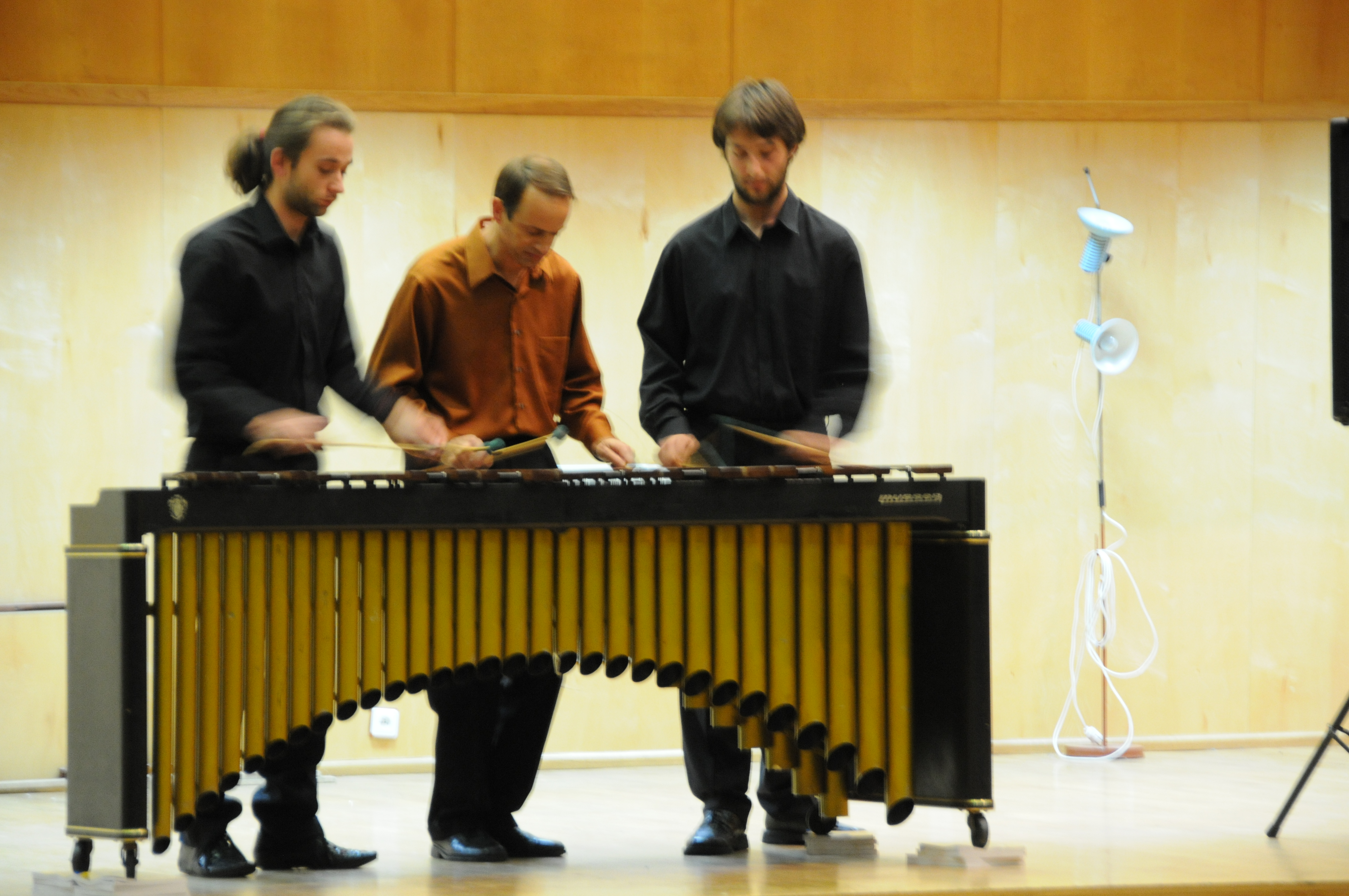
Musser marimba

Following World War II, Musser left the Deagan Company to start his own firm, Musser Marimbas. In addition to marimbas, the company made vibraphones, xylophones, glockenspiels and chimes. Business acumen was not one of Musser's strengths, and the company was sold to Lyons Band Instrument Manufacturers in 1956. The Musser company was sold to Ludwig Drum company in 1965; the latter was sold to Selmer in 1981. Musser's design work, from the bars to the frame, helped to refine and standardize the marimba, although Keiko Abe and Yamaha are largely responsible for the concert marimba as we know it today.

== Northwestern ==
As a teacher, Musser had an important influence on the many students who worked with him. According to Northwestern University (Evanston, Illinois) archival records, Musser served as a part-time instructor of music theory between 1944 and 1946 and a part-time instructor of marimba from 1946 to 1950.

== Compositions ==
Musser's work as a composer spanned his entire career, though much of that work has been lost. As of 1941 he had published fifty-three works, including piano solos, sacred music, and arrangements for marimba and vibraphone. The only Musser originals that survive today are:

- Etude in Ab, Op.6, No.2;
- Etude, Op.6, No.8 ("Nature Boy"/"Whole Tone");
- Etude, Op.6, No.9 (B Major);
- Etude in C Major, Op.6, No.10;
- Prelude, Op.11, No.3 (G Major);
- Etude, Op.11, No.4 (C Major);
- Prelude, Op.11, No.7 (D Major).

Two of Musser's other surviving works are arrangements from his marimba orchestras. Rosales' "Bolero" from the 1933 Century of Progress Orchestra, and Saint-Saëns' "Piano Concerto no. 2" from a 1942 performance by a 160-piece marimba orchestra at Soldier Field in Chicago.

== Musser Grip ==
Musser developed the Musser grip, a new technique for playing the marimba with four mallets that differed significantly from the already existing cross grip. The musser grip allowed for greater independence between individual mallets, and would later be modified into its modern form by Leigh Howard Stevens.

== Engineering and astronomy ==
Musser entered into a career as a scientist after leaving Northwestern in the early 1950s. He moved to Southern California where began to do work in astronomy for Hughes and for NASA. He also developed classroom planetaria and other teaching materials which can be found at Cape Kennedy, the Air Force Academy, Griffith Observatory, and many schools and universities. Later he earned a doctorate in engineering from Oxford University.
