= Guitar zither =

Musical instrument

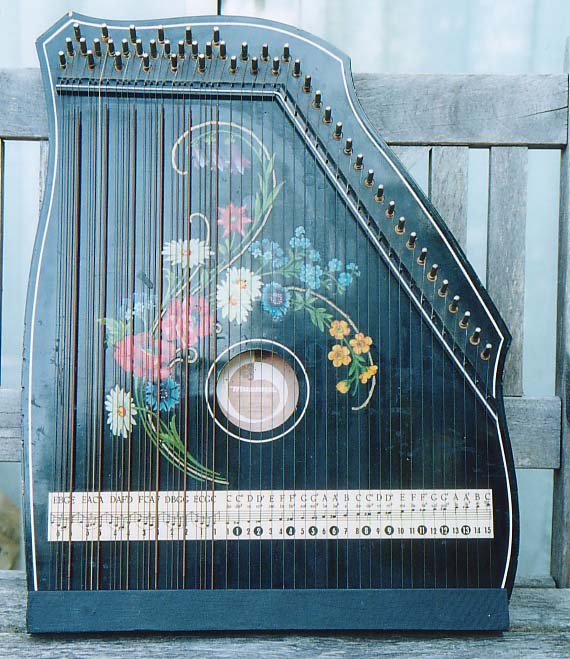
A Musima Guitar Zither with 25 melody strings and 24 chord strings. A 6/25 - 6 chord sets and 25 melody strings - fretless zither

The guitar zither (also chord zither, fretless zither, mandolin zither or harp zither) is a musical instrument consisting of a sound-box with two sets of unstopped strings. One set of strings is tuned to the diatonic, chromatic, or partially chromatic scale and the other set is tuned to make the various chords in the principal key of the melody strings.

First patented May 29, 1894 by Friederich Menzenhauer (1858-1937), the guitar zither came into use in the late 19th century and was widely mass-produced in the United States and in Germany by Menzenhauer and later by Oscar Schmidt Inc., the Phonoharp Company, and others'.

The 1902 Sears catalog touted the Deweylin Harp—a type of fretless zither—as "...the wonder of the age," and "...the greatest musical instrument that has ever been placed before the public." These mandolin-guitar-zithers purported to combine three instruments for the price of one.

A form of psaltery and member of the family of chordophones, the guitar zither is closely related to the Autoharp, first patented over 20 years earlier. It differs from it in not having damping bars for producing chords, and from the concert zither by the absence of a fretboard for melodic use.

The name guitar zither is apparently derived from its sound. The mandolin zither (or mandolin harp) has doubled strings in unison courses producing a more mandolin-like sound.
