= List of marimbists =

Particularly notable classical performers on the marimba include:

== A ==
- Keiko Abe
- Amampondo

== B ==
- Bogdan Bacanu
- Daniel Bolgar
- Gary Burton

== C ==
- Pedro Carneiro
- Vida Chenoweth
- Pius Cheung
- Musekiwa Chingodza
- Tom Collier
- John Chellis (Jack) Conner
- Colin Currie

== D ==
- Dave Danford
- Martin Denny
- François Du Bois

== E ==
- Claire Olivia Edwardes*

== G ==
- Evelyn Glennie
- Joseph Gramley

== H ==
- Roland Haerdtner
- Bobby Hutcherson

== I ==
- Jack Imel

== J ==
- Alex Jacobowitz
- Ruth Stuber Jeanne
- Brian Jones

== K ==
- Reg Kehoe and his Marimba Queens
- Spencer Krug

== L ==
- Joe Locke
- Arthur Lyman

== M ==
- Gillian Maitland
- Ed Mann
- Dumisani Maraire
- Hokoyo Marimba
- Linda Maxey
- Luigi Morleo
- Clair Omar Musser
- Katarzyna Mycka

== N ==
- Zeferino Nandayapa

== P ==
- Gloria Parker
- Robert Paterson
- Percujove
- Paco Pérez
- Dave Pike

== R ==
- John Rae
- Steve Reich
- Michael Rosen
- Emil Richards

== S ==
- Kathryn Salfelder
- Eric Sammut
- Dave Samuels
- Emmanuel Séjourné
- Leigh Howard Stevens
- Gordon Stout

== T ==
- Art Tripp

== U ==
- Ruth Underwood

== V ==
- Robert van Sice * Alexander Vichev

== Z ==
- Nancy Zeltsman

== In pop music ==
- Spencer Krug as Moonface
- Julius Wechter (with Herb Alpert's Tijuana Brass and Baja Marimba Band)
- Jack White of The White Stripes
- Jon Fishman of Phish
- Brian Jones of The Rolling Stones
