= Emmanuel Séjourné =

French composer

Emmanuel Séjourné (born 16 July 1961) is a French composer and percussionist, and head of percussion at the Conservatoire de Strasbourg. His music is influenced by Western classical music and by popular music (rock, jazz, extra-European music).

== Education ==
Séjourné was born in Limoges. After studying classical piano, violin, music history, acoustics and musical analysis at the Conservatoire de Strasbourg, Séjourné continued his education there, and in 1976 entered the percussion class of Jean Batigne, founder director of Les Percussions de Strasbourg. Under his guidance, Séjourné became interested in contemporary and improvised music. He won first prize (médaille d'or) in percussion in 1980, and then specialized in mallet percussion.

== Career ==
In 1984 he became professor of mallet percussion at the conservatory and won the European Audio-visual Grand Prix for his 1981 CD Saxophone et Percussion. As a player, he is considered one of the most prominent mallet percussionists and expanded vibraphone and marimba performance by introducing six-stick playing and the vibra-midi. He began to compose around the time he began teaching. While continuing his activities on stage and in teaching, Séjourné emphasized composition.

=== Teacher ===
In 1984 Séjourné began teaching mallet percussion at the conservatory and became head of the percussion department. He received his Certificat d'Aptitude in percussion in 1991. In 1994, he was appointed academic advisor to the French Ministry of Culture for the preparation of the Certificat d'Aptitude. He regularly sits on the juries of international competitions and gives master classes in the major music academies in Europe, Asia and North America. His educational compositions include a method of mallet percussion in 6 volumes. He is also co-author of 10 ans avec la percussion (2002).

=== Performer ===
In 1981 Séjourné and saxophonist Philippe Geiss founded the group Noco Music that recorded Saxophone et Percussion. The album was awarded the audiovisual European Grand Prix in 1984 by the Academie du Disque Français. In 1996, accompanied by the New London Chamber Choir, Séjourné premiered Séance for soprano, choir and MIDI vibraphone, by the English composer James Wood.

As a member of the contemporary ensemble Accroche-Note since 1988, he has premièred more than one hundred works by composers including Donatoni, Dillon, Aperghis, Manoury, Fedele, Mash and Pesson. His performance repertoire includes concertos, chamber music and solos.

He has given numerous recitals in Europe, Asia and North America and has performed with orchestras including the Orchestre Philharmonique de Luxembourg, with which he recorded Concerto for Marimba and Orchestra by Camille Kerger (1997). He has participated in many festivals, including "Archipelago" in Geneva, "Ars Musica" in Brussels, "Ultima" in Oslo and "Musica" in Strasbourg, the Huddersfield and Zurich festivals and the Venice and Zagreb Biennales. He has recorded for Universal, Fingerprint and Auvidis studios.

Séjourné has played improvised music and jazz, particularly with the Swiss guitarist Max Lasser, the Swiss percussionist Fritz Hauser and with Friedemann – the composer with whom he won the German Jazz Award Gold 2012 for The Concert, and in a mallet percussion duo with Sylvie Reynaert.

As a percussionist, Séjourné has specialised in marimba and vibraphone. He has been called "one of the world's best vibraphone players".

=== Composer ===
Séjourné began to compose around the time he became a faculty member at the conservatory, and focused increasingly on it while continuing to perform and teach.

In his works, Séjourné varies the ensembles, composing for orchestras, chamber ensembles and soloists. His music is eclectic. His compositions include incidental music and musicals, as well as dance and film music. He also works as a composer for France Culture, German television networks ARD and ZDF and the Franco-German cultural television channel ARTE.

His incidental music composed in 1984 won the award for Best Music at the Avignon Festival. In 1988, on the occasion of the 2000th anniversary of the City of Strasbourg, he was invited to compose the music for The Invaders for the Ballet du Rhin. He wrote Planet Claviers (1998) for the ensemble Percussions Claviers de Lyon on a commission from Grame Festival. The work was performed more than 120 times between 1998 and 2001. In 2001, returning to his preference for a mixture of forms of expression, he composed Famim, a piece combining improvised, contemporary and popular music, commissioned and premiered by the jazz pianist Michael Borstslap and the Amsterdam Percussion Group. In 2004, at the request of the Luxembourg National Theatre, he wrote the musical School Boulevard.

Séjourné composed concertos for percussion and orchestra, of which two attracted international attention. His Concerto for Vibraphone and String Orchestra, composed in 1999 and premièred by the Orchestra of the Auvergne, has been well received by critics. The Luxemburger Wort wrote: "[The concerto] provides living proof of the tremendous growth of the percussion and the emergence of the process of creation in contemporary music ...". The Concerto for Marimba and String Orchestra (2006), commissioned and performed by Bogdan Bacanu accompanied by the Salzburg Soloists, became a standard work in the marimba repertoire. Anne-Julie Caron, a Canadian percussionist, described it as "unique because it is one of the rare pieces to put the marimba in a romantic context". After a performance at the Washington Square Festival in New York, a reviewer called it "gorgeously composed". It was recorded on the album True Colors.

Séjourné is supported in his work by many sponsors, including the cities of Arras, Aurillac, Strasbourg and Luxembourg City, the General Council of Bouches du Rhone, the European Institute of Choral singing, and the Paris Opera. He was commissioned and recorded by Gary Cook, John Pennington, Ju Percussion Group, Robert van Sice, Nancy Zeltsman, Marta Klimasara, Katarzyna Mycka, Sylvie Reynaert, and Amsterdam Percussion Group. His works are often included in orchestral repertoires, including the Nagoya Philharmonic, Osaka Philharmonic, Sinfonia Toronto, Croatian Radio Television Symphony, Luxembourg Philharmonic, Orchestre de la Suisse Romande, Lausanne Chamber Orchestra, Orchestra of Italian Switzerland, Camerata de Bourgogne, Bochum Symphoniker, Württemberg Chamber Orchestra Heilbronn, Orchestre d'Auvergne, Cannes, Nice, and Pau.

== Works ==
Orchestra / Large Ensemble / Choir with soloist

- Concerto for vibraphone and string orchestra (1999) – commissioned by Vibraphone International Competition; also known as Concerto for Vibraphone and Piano
- Concerto for solo percussion and brass orchestra (2002) – commissioned by ADDIM 78
- Concerto for 3 percussions and brass orchestra (2002) – commissioned by ADDIM 78
- Concerto for vibraphone and 5 percussions (2002) – version for percussion group of the Concerto for vibraphone and string orchestra
- Book of Gemmes (2003) – for mixed choir, 2 percussions; Latin text of the bishop Marbode (1037–1125); commissioned by Gary Cook and John Pennington
- Concerto for Marimba and String Orchestra (2005) – commissioned by Bogdan Bacanu
- Ketsana (2006) – for symphonic orchestra; commissioned by Young Mondial World Orchestra
- Carmina 86 (2007) – for mixed choir, two pianos and five percussionists; commissioned by INECC
- America's Cup Concerto (2007) – for multi-percussion solo and orchestra; commissioned by Young Mondial World Orchestra
- Ta voix contre la pauvreté (2008) – suite for tenor, soprano, choir, synthesizer and 2 percussions, based on the "Declaration of Human Rights; commissioned by INECC
- ConCerto Fuoco (2009) – for marimba and brass orchestra – commissioned by Attilio Terlizzi
- Magellan Concerto (2010) – for percussion and string orchestra – five movements; commissioned by Concours International de Percussion Cannes
- Double Concerto for Vibraphone, Marimba and Orchestra (2012) – commissioned by Tatiana Koleva

Chamber Music

- African Songs Duo (1994) – for two marimbas
- African Songs Trio (1992) – for three marimbas
- Martian Tribes (1995) – for 4 percussions; commissioned by Rotterdam Percussion
- Losa (1999) – duo for marimba and vibraphone
- Famim (2001) – for piano and four percussions; commissioned by Amsterdam Percussion Group
- Famim 2 (2002) – duo for piano and percussion; commissioned by the group Pianosticks
- Resilience (2004) – visual music for eight percussionists; commissioned by Ju Percussion Group
- Departures (2005) – duo for 2 marimbas 5 octaves; premiered by Nancy Zeltsman and Ria Ideta
- Eluard 's Pieces (2006) – for marimba 5 octaves and baritone; commissioned by Doug Smith
- Sosso-Bala (2007) – for eight percussionists; commissioned by Ju Percussion Group
- Suite for marimba and percussion quartet (2007) – commissioned by Laurent Mariusse
- Attraction (2007) – for violin, marimba 5 octaves and tape; commissioned by the Opera of Paris
- Calienta (2009) – for guitar and marimba 5 octaves; commissioned by duo Berimba
- Abalone (2011) – for flute and two 5 octave marimbas; commissioned by Art, Culture and Tradition Association of St Paul de Vence
- Avalanche (2012) – for percussion (vibraphone, marimba) and piano; commissioned by A. Gerassimez
- Khamsin (2018) – for 2 percussion (marimba 5 octave, castanets); commissioned by Quey Percussion Duo

Solo

- Nancy (1989) – marimba 5 octaves
- African Songs (1991) – for marimba
- 6 Baguettes (1994) - for marimba
- Katamiya (1995) – for marimba
- Chandigarh (2007) – for marimba 5 octaves; commissioned by Guy Frisch
- Romantica (2007) – for marimba 5 octaves
- Prelude (2012) – for marimba 5 octaves; commissioned by Bogdan Bacanu

Performance

- Planète Claviers (1998) – performance for five percussionists; commissioned by Percussions Claviers de Lyon group
- Quarto para Quatro (2001) – performance for four percussionists; commissioned by the group Drumming (Portugal)
- Resilience (2004) – performance for 8 percussionists; commissioned by Ju Percussion Group (Taiwan)
- Comment on fait pour le soleil (2004) – commissioned by the regional council of Provence-Alpes-Côte d'Azur; texts/director Pierre-Jean Carrus
- School Boulevard (2005) – musical theatre; commissioned by the National Theatre of Luxembourg; music and scenario E. Séjourné; dialogues and scenario: C. Duguet; staging and choreography: G. Celestino

Music for young audiences

- Issa (2004) – for percussion ensemble, children choir, tenor and soprano; commissioned by the city of Arras
- La forêt (2006) – for percussion ensemble, jazz quartet, and narrator; commissioned by the town of Aurillac
- Kiga (2007) – for large percussion ensemble; commissioned by the association Ça Percute
- Esperanto (2010) – for wind ensemble, percussion, harp, children choir; commissioned by Communauté de communes Les Coteaux d'Azur
- Alcyan (2011) – for large percussion ensemble and mixed choir; commissioned by the association Percutemps/ the town of Arras

Dance

- Gwen (1985) – for magnetic tape; J. Garcia's choreography for the dance group the Opéra national du Rhin
- La saga des Rohan (1989) – historical fresco, commissioned by the city of Saverne and the Regional Council of Alsace
- Feu (1989) – commissioned by the city of Strasbourg on the occasion of the bicentenary of the French Revolution
- Syndrome 87 (1987) – for magnetic tape; choreography by Marie-Anne Thil
- Musicoregraphiline (1987) – trio for 2 percussions and saxophone; commissioned by Ludwigsburg Festival, choreography by Marianne Thil
- Les Envahisseurs (1988) – for percussion group, synthesizer, and 6 brass instruments; commissioned by the city of Strasbourg; choreography by Jean Sarelli for the Ballet du Rhin
- Fête Nationale (2002) – commissioned by Luxembourg City on the occasion of the Luxembourg National Day
- Metathesis (2014) – for 2 percussions and 2 dancers – commissioned by KrausFrink Percussion Duo

Theatre

- Schpaane und Scharwe (1983) – Drapiers Theatre
- La légende des siècles (1985) – Company MAL / TJP
- Jacques le peintre (1985) – Drapiers Theatre
- Dans la nuit (1987) – Drapiers Theatre
- Brel Abend (2001) – Wallgraben-Theater Freiburg (Germany)
- Blue Room (2001) – Wallgraben-Theater Freiburg (Germany)

Television and radio

- Deutschland im August (1985) – ZDF film (Germany)
- Schmutzohne Grenzen (1986) – ARD film (Germany)
- Le monastère hanté (1986) – France Culture serial
- Jeu de mort (1987) – Short film
- Le lutin aux rubans (1987) – France Culture serial
- Meingewissensagtnein (1988) – ZDF fiction (Germany)
- Null Bock in der Kunst (1989) – ARD film (Germany)
- Gleichnisse (1990) – ARD film (Germany)
- Paraboles (1991) – ARD / ORF / GIS film
- Gleichnisse (1997) – ARD film (Germany)
- Mississippi (2000) – ARTE film
- J'ai vu changer la terre (2010) – France 5 serial
- Des racines et des ailes (2011) – France 3
- Thalassa (2013) – France 3

== Discography ==
=== As performer ===
Contemporary music soloist

- Withered leaves – New Birth – for solo marimba and orchestra – works by Kerger, Manoury, Mash, Almada, Smith, Batistelli, and Takemitsu – with the Orchestre Philharmonique de Luxembourg, conductor: Paul Polivnick – Crystal / SCACD 54221
- Donatoni: Mari – Centre International de Percussion – Grammond Portrait / MGB CTS-M81

With the Accroche-Note ensemble

- Accroche-Note: Live in Berlin – MFP
- Georges Aperghis: Simulacres – Universal
- Ivan Fedele: Maja – Empreinte digitale 2004 (Coup de coeur Charles Cros, five diapason awards by Monde de la musique)
- Philippe Manoury: Chamber Music – Empreinte digitale 2007
- François-Bernard Mâche: Chamber Music – Empreinte digitale 2007

Jazz

- Friedemann: Indian Summer – Biber Records 1987
- Friedemann: Short stories – Biber Records 2002
- Friedemann: The Concert – Biber Records 2005 (German Jazz Award Gold 2012)

=== As composer ===
- "Sosso-Bala" – CD Moving On Ju Percussion Group – Windmusic.com
- "Famim" – CD Release Amsterdam Percussion Group – APG Music 2003
- "Departures" – CD Marimba Classica Katarzyna Mycka – SWR Stuttgart/MONS Records 2008
- Concerto for Marimba and Orchestra – CD True Colors Bogdan Bacanu – Classic Concert Records
- Concerto for Vibraphone – CD Vibraphone Concertos Alexandru Anastasiu and Bucharest National Radio Orchestra – Sniper Media 2009
- "Nancy" – CD Rhythm and Time Robert van Sice – Biber Records 66601
- "Katamiya" – CD See Ya Thursday Nancy Zeltsman – Equilibrium EQ 29
