= Roland Haerdtner =

German marimba player

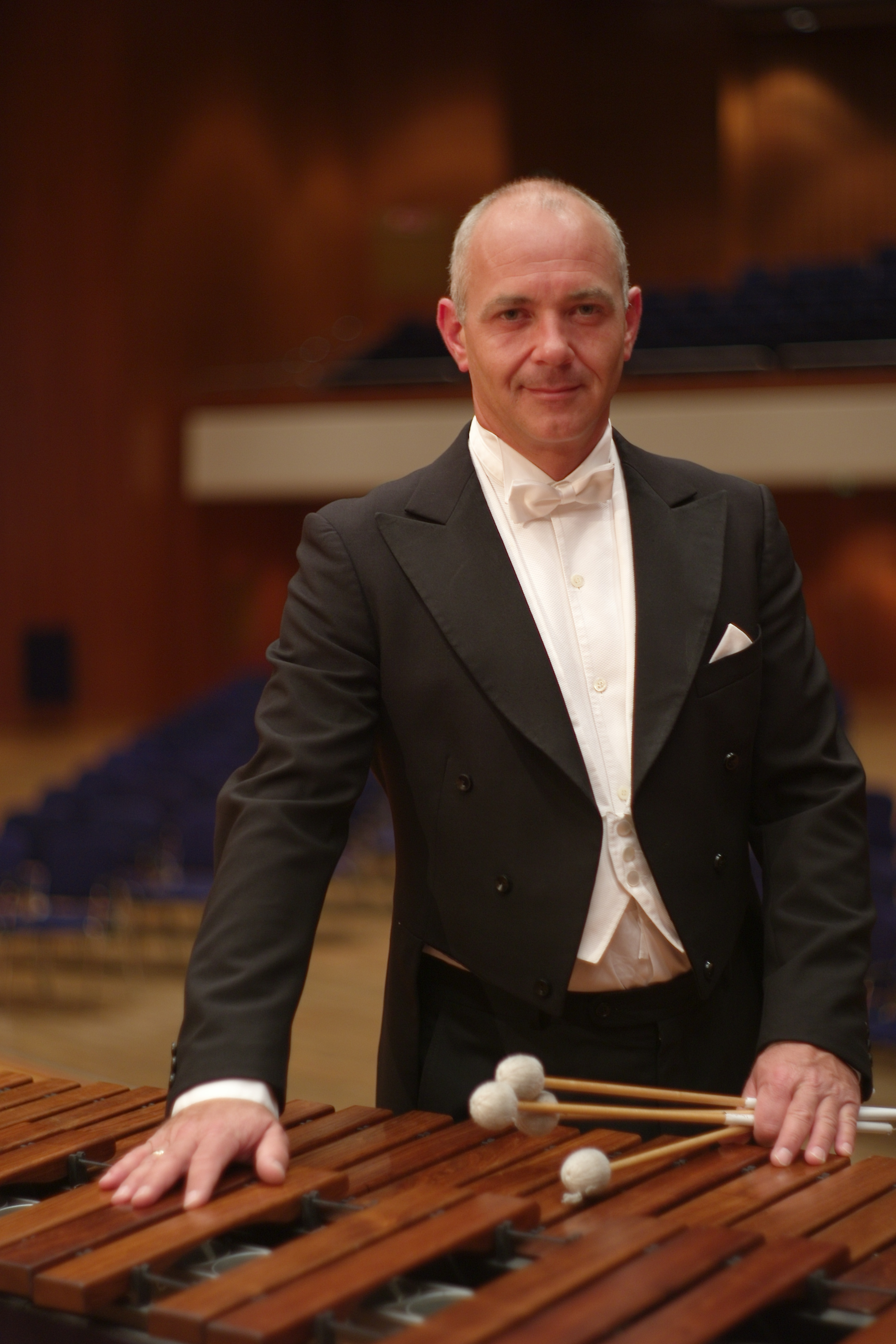
Roland Haerdtner 2009

Roland Haerdtner, orig. Härdtner (born 27 March 1964) is a German marimba player, a soloist for mallet instruments, percussion and timpani. Since 1993 he is principal timpanist and percussionist of the Badische Philharmonie Pforzheim.

== Biography ==
At the age of twenty, Haerdtner started his musical education at the Badisches Konservatorium in Karlsruhe. With the beginning of his studies at the Robert-Schumann-Hochschule Düsseldorf (1985–92), he concentrated on independent-minded interpretations of demanding concert literature (e.g. the Concerto pour Marimba, Vibraphone et Orchestre, op.278 by Darius Milhaud) and on the arrangement of western cultural sphere’s music for his instruments. Up to now he doesn’t commit himself neither to single epochs in concert literature nor to specific stylistic ways of play. Besides his work as an orchestra musician, he has established himself in the concert business as a soloist for the mallet instruments marimba, vibraphone and xylophone since the 1980s. Meanwhile, his repertoire with hundreds of works, especially in the field of the mallet arrangements, is considered as worldwide unique ^{[1]}.

The discography of Roland Haerdtner documents this with twelve CD-productions so far, on which he can be heard as a soloist. His repertoire includes various musical styles such as world music as well as pop music and jazz on the one hand, and is leading within classical music from baroque through romanticism up to the contemporary music, on the other hand. On these records he has worked together with the internationally well-respected djembe player Amadou Kienou from Burkina Faso, the Baden-Badener Philharmonie, the Württembergische Philharmonie Reutlingen, the Südwestdeutsches Kammerorchester and the Badische Philharmonie Pforzheim, to name but a few. Besides others, these CDs were created in cooperation with the major label EMI as well as various record labels (e.g. Virgin Classics, ebs, RBM) and broadcasting companies like the SDR - Stuttgart and the SWR Baden-Baden.

At the turn of the millennium, a main focus of his present work was the involvement with Johann Sebastian Bach’s musical works with arrangements of more than 40 compositions of the past master. Haerdtner shows on his CD Badinerie from 2000 a high rate of faithfulness to the text in his interpretations. To contrast with this, the jazz arrangements of his quartet Swinging Mallets from the CD AIRevolution (published in 2001) are merely guided, besides some quotations, by the harmonic framework of Bach’s reference.

Haerdtner’s arrangement of the Concerto for Violin and Orchestra No.1 by Philip Glass for marimba and vibraphone, which he published with the permission of the composer and his publisher Dunvagen Music Publishers for the 2010 CD Virtuos Mallets, received international attention.

Besides arrangements for his instruments, Roland Haerdtner also does recordings originally composed for the mallets which can be considered as a kind of a reference, due to a close cooperation with the composer. An example for this can be the most successful - measured on the number of its presentations - marimba concert of concert literature Concerto for Marimba and String Orchestra No.1 by the Brazilian Ney Rosauro, composed in 1986 ^{[2]}, which was also recorded for the CD Virtuos Mallets by Haerdtner and is described as “One of the best performances from my concerto that I ever heard.” by the composer himself ^{[1,3]}.

== Recorded CDs ==
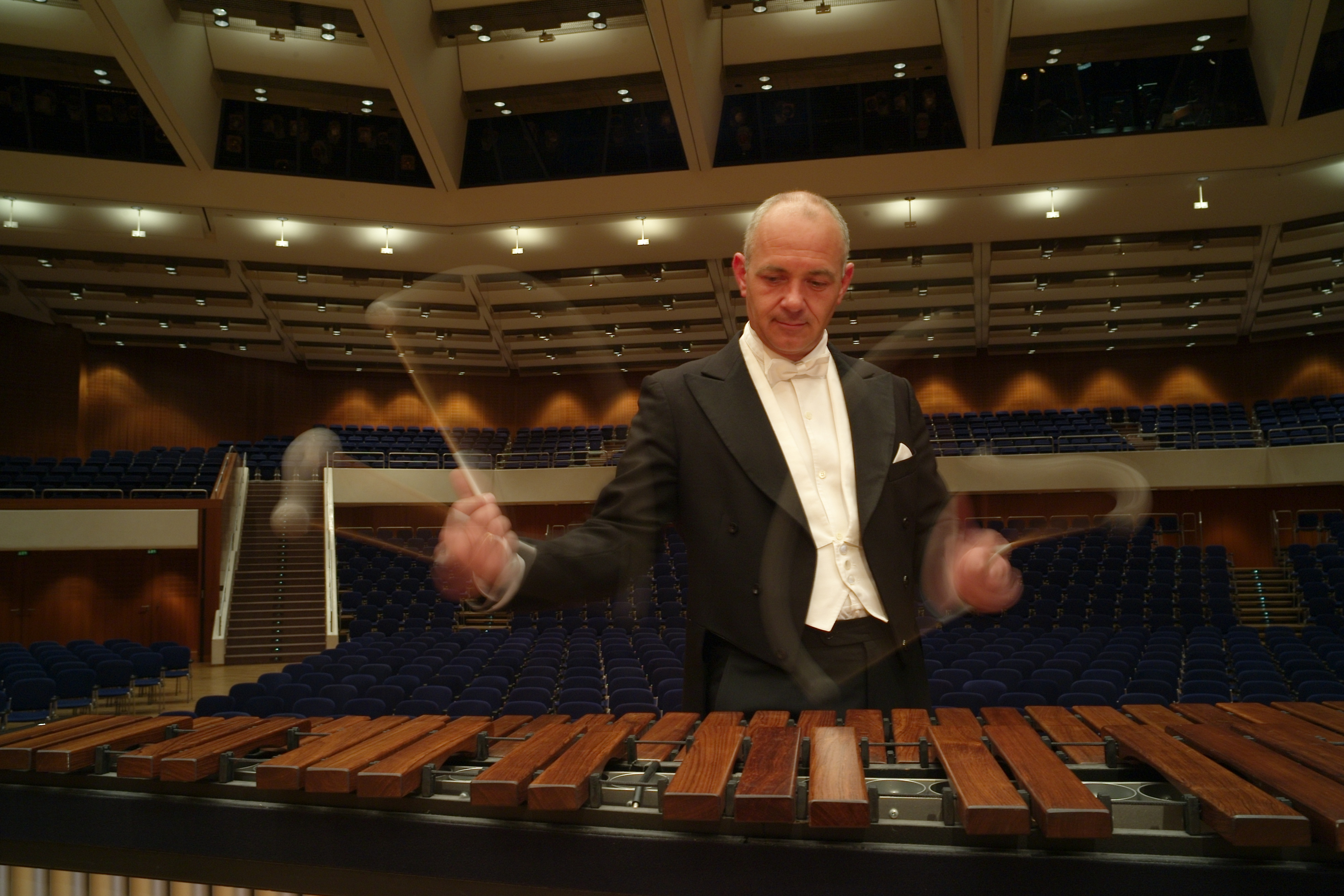
Roland Haerdtner on Marimba

- 1994 Swinging Mallets with Holger Engel (p), Klaus Dusek (b), Georg Schmid (dr)
- 1996 Swinging Mallets II with Swinging Mallets Trio, Nebojša Jovan Živković, u.a.
- 1997 Solo Mallets
- 1998 Classic Mallets with Badische Philharmonie Pforzheim, Jari Hämäläinen (Conductor)/ Süddeutscher Rundfunk (SDR - Stuttgart)
- 2000 Badinerie / Classic Mallets play Bach with Südwestdeutsches Kammerorchester Pforzheim, Rolf Schweizer (Conductor)
- 2001 AIRevolution / Swinging Mallets play Bach with Boris Ritter (p), Klaus Dusek (b), Lars Binder (dr)
- 2002 Teufelstanz with Baden-Badener Philharmonie, Werner Stiefel (Conductor)
- 2005 Percussion Mallets with Amadou Kienou, u.a.
- 2006 Mallets Mozartissimo with Badische Philharmonie Pforzheim, Jari Hämäläinen (Conductor) / Südwestrundfunk (SWR - Baden-Baden)
- 2007 Entertain Mallets with Boris Ritter (p), Klaus Dusek (b), Eckhard Stromer (dr)
- 2008 Mallets for Kids with Boris Ritter (p), Klaus Dusek (b), Eckhard Stromer (dr)
- 2010 Virtuos Mallets with Württembergische Philharmonie Reutlingen, Jari Hämäläinen (Conductor), Markus Huber (Conductor), Rolf Schweizer (Conductor)
