= Julia Drukh =

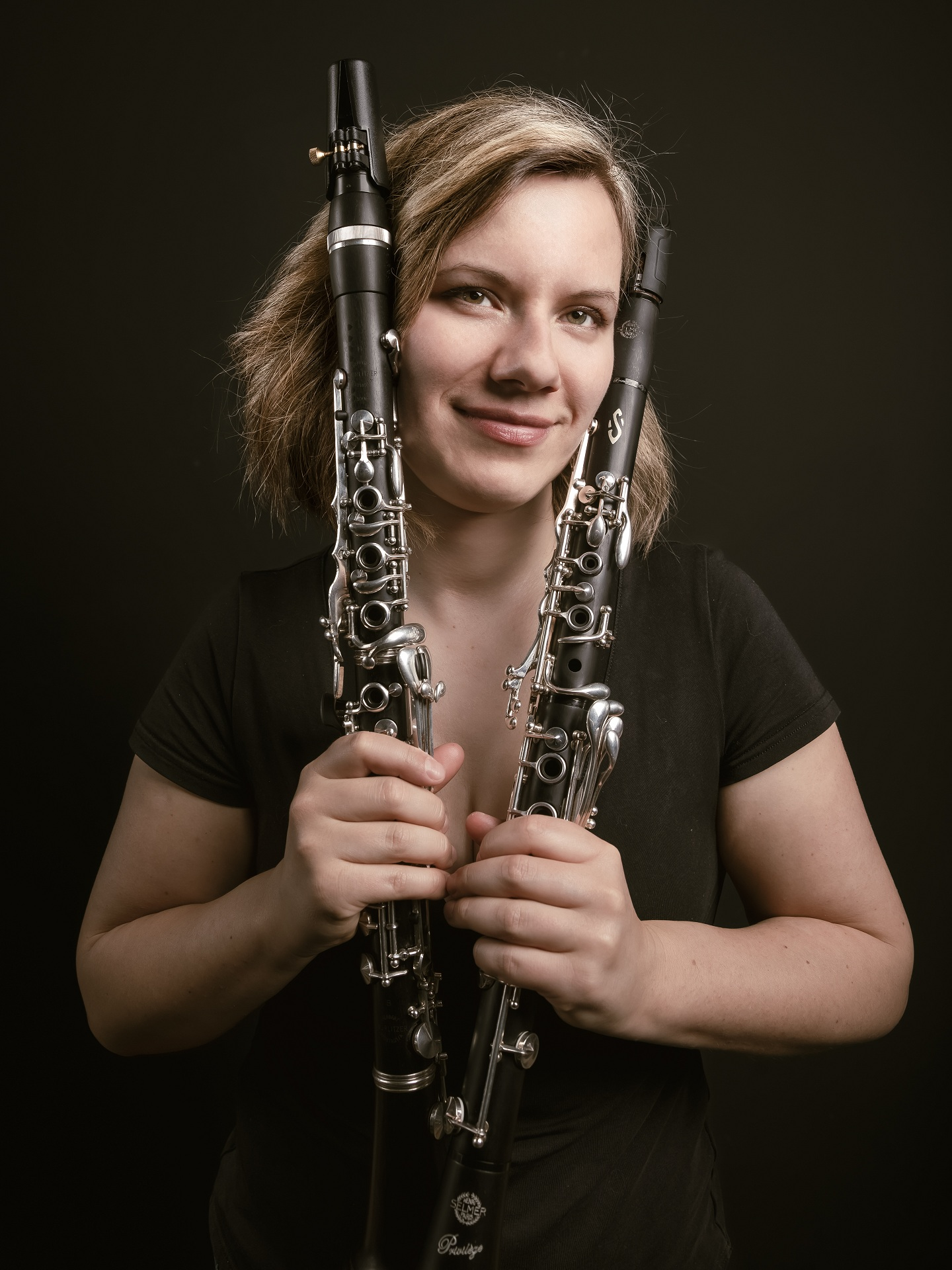
- Julia Drukh (2025)

Background information
- Born: 31 July 1990 (age 35); Saint Petersburg, Russia
- Genres: Classical, Contemporary music
- Occupations: Clarinetist, Arranger
- Instruments: Clarinet, Saxophone
- Years active: 2006–present
- Website: www.julia-drukh.com

Julia Drukh (also Yulia Drukh; Russian Юлия Друх, German transcription Julija Druch; born 31 July 1990 in Leningrad) is a German-Russian clarinettist and arranger.

== Life and artistic work ==
Julia Drukh comes from a family of musicians – her father is the composer Igor Drukh, her mother is a pianist and her twin sister is the violinist Elina Drukh. She first studied in her hometown at the Mussorgsky Musik College under Alexey Tikhonov and then at the Rimski-Korsakow-Konservatorium under Andrey Kazakov.

In Germany, she completed her master's degree at the College of music Karlsruhe under Wolfgang Meyer and then she passed her concert exam with distinction at the State University of Music and Performing Arts Stuttgart under Norbert Kaiser. She also studied saxophone as a minor subject under Ekkehard Rössle.

She was an intern at the SWR-Symphonieorchester, deputy principal clarinetist at the Düsseldorf Symphony Orchestra, worked as principal clarinetist at the Osnabrücker Symphonieorchester and as bass clarinetist at the Dortmunder Philharmoniker. She also performed as an orchestral musician in several projects with the symphony orchestras of NDR, WDR, WDR Funkhausorchester, and SWR, and has made guest appearances at the Karlsruher Barockorchester, Badischen Philharmonie Pforzheim, Württembergischen Philharmonie Reutlingen, Badische Staatskapelle Karlsruhe, Mannheim National Theatre, Württemberg Chamber Orchestra Heilbronn and Bochumer Symphoniker.

Since October 2024, she has been principal clarinetist at the Clara-Schumann-Philharmoniker. Drukh plays both the German and French clarinet systems on a professional level and is an official Wurlitzer Artist.

Parallel to her orchestral career, she also performs internationally as a soloist and chamber musician. She is or has been a member of chamber music ensembles such as Duo YuNiKa, Trio Y, Zeitlose Musik und Fin de Siècle. Additionally, she has performed as a chamber musician in several projects with the ensemble new music Klangforum Wien, including at impuls . 8. Festival for Contemporary Music and Festival d´Automne in Paris.

In the field of teaching, she was a lecturer for wood and brass instruments at the Landesjugendensemble Neu Musik in Baden-Württemberg (under Christof Löser) and between 2021 and 2022 she had a teaching position for Praxis Neue Musik at the State University of Music and Performing Arts Stuttgart.

Since 2025 she has been teaching wind instruments and contemporary music at the State University of Music and Performing Arts Stuttgart.

== Prizes and awards ==
Julia Drukh has won numerous national and international competitions as a soloist and chamber musician:

- 2024: Grand-prix „Crown of Stars“ bei Music & Stars Awards (Award for Poesie der Luft – Best CD-Performer)
- 2021: Finalist & Scholarship Recipient of the Deutschen Musikwettbewerbs with the Trio Y, Germany
- 2021: 1. Price „First Great Award“ at the 3rd Vienna International Music Competition, Austria
- 2020: Award winner of the DAAD-Price 2020 for international students, Germany
- 2018: 3. Price at International Clarinet Competition Saverio Mercadante in the Solo category, Italy
- 2017: Special prize at the International Chamber Music Competition with the Duo YuNiKa, Bulgaria
- 2017: Special prize at the Europäischen Kammermusikwettbewerb with the Duo YuKa, Germany
- 2015: Award winner at the International Interpretation Competition of Neue Musik Zeitgenuss, Germany
- 2015: Special prize in the category chamber music at the 22. International Brahms Competition with the Duo YuNiKa, Austria
- 2006: 1. Price at the 1. International Weber-Clarinet Competition in the Solo category, Russia

== Commitments ==
- 2025: jury member ath the 23th Chieri Internationalen Competition, Italien
- seit 2024: jury member at the International Music Online Competition Meistersingers, Russland
- 2010 bis 2015: Co-founding, organizing, and executing the festival Zeitlose Musik, Germany

== Discography ==
- Yulia Drukh: Poesie der Luft. for solo clarinet, Yulia Drukh (clarinet), GENUIN classics, Leipzig 2023, GEN 23831.
- Felix Treiber: Kammermusik 2005–2018. including with Julia Drukh (clarinet), ANTES Edition / Bella Musica, 2021, BM149009.
- Radoslaw Pallarz: Rapunzel. including with Julia Drukh (clarinet), Edition Farbig / Navis Musik, 2020.

== Publications (sheet music editions) ==
Julia Drukh is an arranger for a series of sheet music published by C.F. Schmidt Musikverlag and IKURO Edition Musikverlag. Her arrangements include:

- Isaac Albéniz: Asturias (Editing for solo clarinet)
- George Gershwin: Rhapsody in Blue (Editing for clarinet, saxophone and piano)
- Gustav Mahler: Adagietto aus der 5. Sinfonie (Editing for clarinet and piano)
