= Stadttheater Pforzheim =

Theatre in Baden-Württemberg, Germany

Coordinates: 48°53′22″N 8°42′09″E

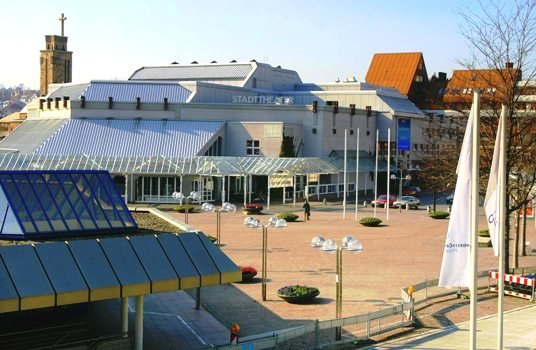
Stadttheater Pforzheim

Stadttheater Pforzheim is a theatre in Baden-Württemberg, Germany. It is home to the city of Pforzheim's ballet, theatre, and opera companies, as well as the Badische Philharmonie Pforzheim orchestra.
