= Pohoda (music festival) =

Music festival in Slovakia

Pohoda Festival
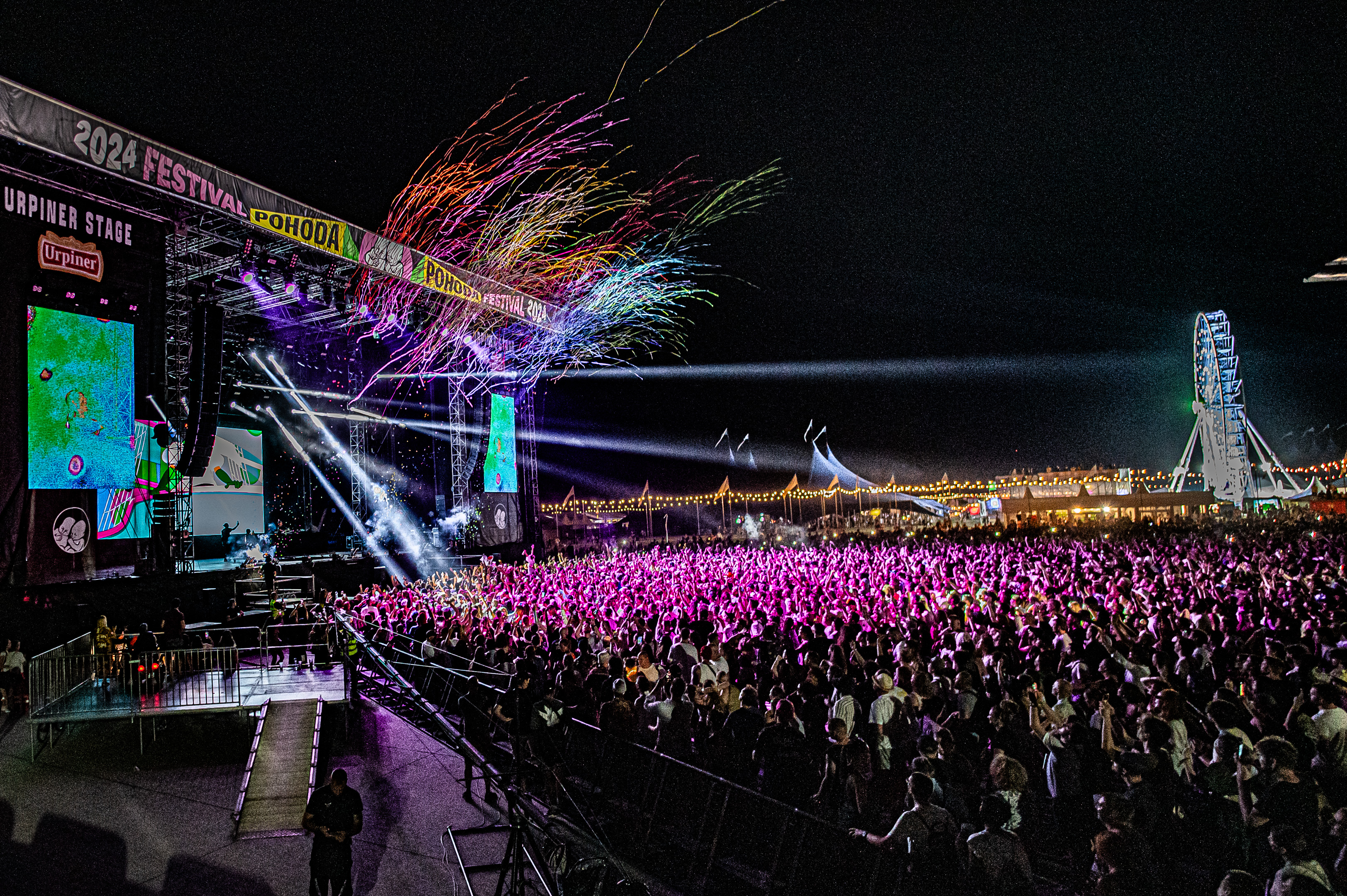
- Pohoda 2024
- Genre: Various
- Dates: First half of July (3 days)
- Locations: Trenčín, Slovakia: Štadión na Sihoti (1997); Pod Sokolicami (1998–2003); Trenčín Airport (2004–present)
- Years active: 1997–present
- Founders: Michal Kaščák, Mário Michna
- Attendance: 30,000 (2019)
- Website: Official website

The word "pohoda" means "relax" or "ease" in the Slovak and Czech languages.

Pohoda is an open-air summer music festival in Slovakia, first organized in 1997 in Trenčín. It is the biggest Slovak music event organized annually. The current venue is Trenčín Airport.

In addition to a variety of musical genres (rock, pop, indie, electronic, classical, experimental and folk), its programme is full of contemporary art – from visual art, theatre, literature, film, dance to stand-up comedy and various workshops, discussions and a zone of non-profit organizations.

Pohoda has been held at the Trenčín Airport since 2004, and the current maximum capacity of the festival is 30,000 visitors. The festival's programme takes place on 16 stages, which each year host over 130 musical performers from all over the world. Some of the most famous names in the festival's history to date include Liam Gallagher, The Chemical Brothers, Björk, The 1975, The Smashing Pumpkins, Lou Reed, The Prodigy, Pixies, The Roots, Mac DeMarco, The XX, Tame Impala, Sigur Rós, Nick Cave and the Bad Seeds, Fatboy Slim, James Blake, St. Vincent, Atoms for Peace, Kraftwerk, Portishead, Moby, Pulp and Suede.

Pohoda is one of the best known cultural brands in Slovakia, regularly winning various awards. In 2023, it was named one of the Top 10 Independent European Festivals by the UK's IQ Magazine and in the same year it won the prestigious Best Medium-Sized European Festival at the European Festival Awards.

The 29th edition of the festival will take place on 10–12 July 2025 and will be headlined by Massive Attack, Iggy Pop, Queens of the Stone Age, Fontaines D.C., Ashnikko and FERG, and co-headlined by Morcheeba, JPEGMafia, Marc Rebillet, Magdalena Bay, Action Bronson, The Kills, Kamasi Washington and Yousuke Yukimatsu.

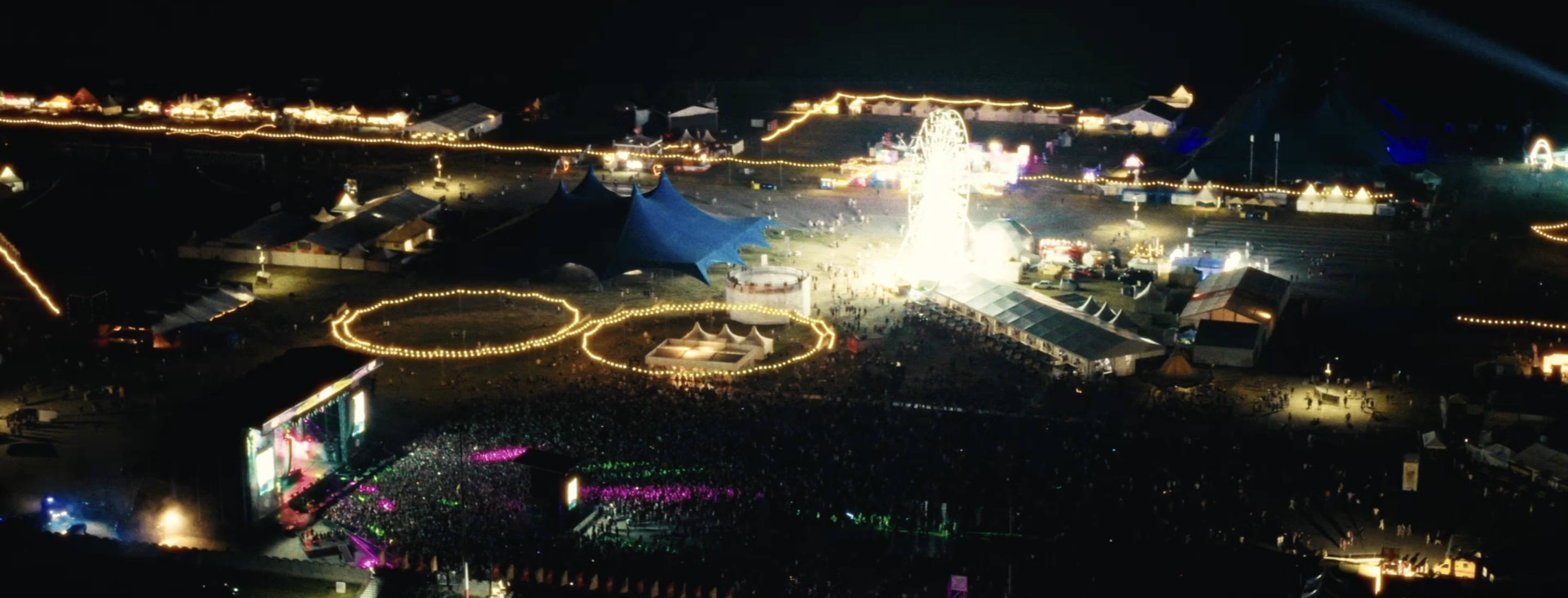
Pohoda's night panorama

== History ==
=== 1990s ===
==== 1997 ====
The first festival organized on 29 June 1997 was called "Kráľovská Pohoda". It took place at the Trenčín town stadium. About 2,000 people attended the event but only 140 tickets were sold. Four Slovak, three Czech and one Russian bands played there.

==== 1998 ====
The festival called "Dobre zvolená Pohoda" was organized on 5 September. The new location was Pod Sokolicami again in Trenčín, which hosted the event until 2003. The festival had two stages – main and dance. Musicians from Slovakia, the Czech Republic, Poland, Austria and Finland attracted about 3,000 people.

==== 1999 ====
The event was significantly larger than the previous ones. It was held on 16 and 17 July, contained two stages and accompanying activities, such as tattooing and balloon rides. The first American band, Skulpey, performed at Pohoda. 8,000 people attended the festival each day.

=== 2000s ===
==== 2000 ====
The festival organized on 21 and 22 July was significantly larger again. The venue was enlarged by the adjacent expo area. It contained four stages - main, dance 1 and 2 and rock and many accompanying activities and events. Notable performers included Bomfunk MC's and Propellerheads' Will White. 20,000 visitors were present each day.

==== 2001 ====
Organized on 20 and 21 July, the festival hosted 5 stages - main, rock/hip-hop, rock open-air, and three dance stages. Notable musicians included Fun Lovin' Criminals, and the event attracted 18,000 people each day.

==== 2002 ====
Seven stages offered a vast array of music genres on 19 and 20 July. Stereo MCs, Sneaker Pimps and Task Force were presented as headliners. Attendance was 20,000/day.

==== 2003 ====
The festival was organized on 18 and 19 July. Headliners included The Cardigans, Kosheen and Skatalites.

Attendance: 20,000/day

==== 2004 ====
The festival was moved to a new venue, Trenčín Airport and took place on 16 and 17 July. Notable musicians included Chumbawamba, Moloko, The Wailers, Asian Dub Foundation, and IAMX.

Attendance: 20,000/day

==== 2005 ====
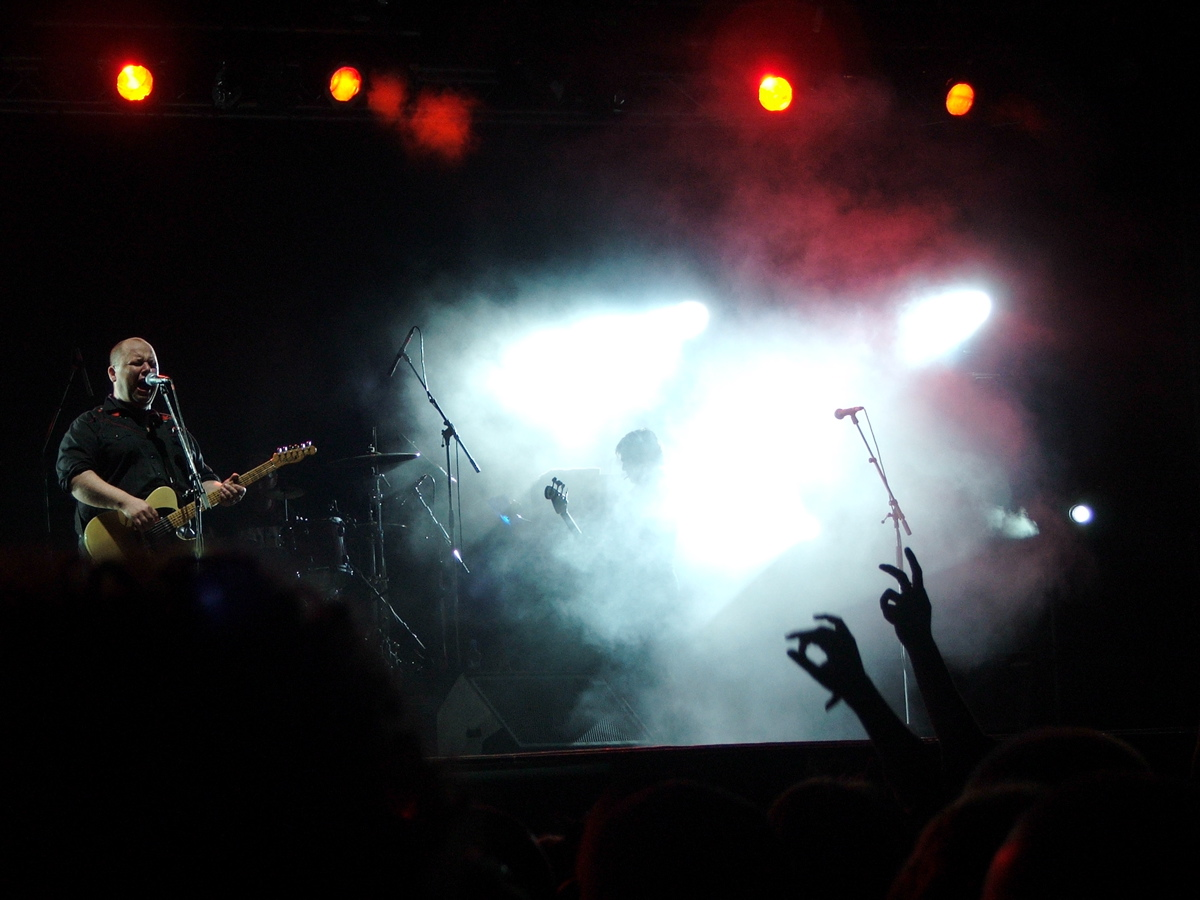
The Pixies at Pohoda 2006

Organized on 15 and 16 July, the event contained sitwo stages and 2 arena theatres. Headliners included The Prodigy, Garbage, Asian Dub Foundation, Little Louie Vega, Klezmatics, Roots Manuva, and Macka B. The festival attracted a record number of visitors - 25,000/day.

==== 2006 ====
On July 14 and 15, the headliners and notable musicians included Coldcut, Pixies, The Frames, Danko Jones, Dizzee Rascal, Gogol Bordello, Natacha Atlas, and Stereo MCs.

Attendance: 22,000/day

==== 2007 ====
The festival took place on 20 and 21 July, and headliners included The Hives, Wu Tang Clan, Basement Jaxx, and Mando Diao.

The event had a record-high attendance with about 27,000 visitors each day.

==== 2008 ====
The festival took place on July 18 and 19. Headliners for this year were Fatboy Slim, The Streets, Editors, Matthew Herbert Big Band, Unkle, Solomon Burke, Mnozil Brass, Richard Müller, Lou Rhodes, Blood Red Shoes and Audio Bullys. Other notable musicians were Joan Baez, The Royal Choral Society and Percujove, the Spanish percussion orchestra.

For the first time in the history of Pohoda Festival it reached an attendance of over 30 000 visitors.

==== 2009 ====
The 2009 festival took place on 16, 17 and 18 July. Percujove, the Spanish percussion orchestra opened the Festival this year. Acts included Basement Jaxx, Patti Smith, Pendulum, The Ting Tings, and High Contrast.

Saturday afternoon concerts of classical music at the main stage have become a tradition. After arias and choruses the Festival have prepared the symbolic fusion of two ensembles this year. A selection of Slavonic Dances (Dvořák), Hungarian Dances (J. Brahms) or Strauss's waltzes was performed by orchestras of the Opera of Slovak National Theatre and Hungarian State Opera.

Travis, the Klaxons and Lamb were scheduled to play, but did not, after the festival was cancelled on Saturday, 18 July after the O2 Aréna tent collapsed due to heavy winds during a thunderstorm. The tent fell on hundreds of people, who took refuge from the rain, killing two and severely injuring dozens.

The organizers of Pohoda Festival decided that despite the 2009 tragedy, the festival would still return in 2010.

=== 2010s ===
==== 2010 ====
The 2010 festival took place on 8, 9 and 10 July, on Trenčín Airport. The most notable artists included The xx, Klaxons, Crystal Castles, José González, Scissor Sisters, Friendly Fires, Digitalism (DJ set), The Stranglers, The Futureheads, New Young Pony Club, Does It Offend You, Yeah?, múm, Autechre, Jape, These New Puritans, Leftfield, Ian Brown and Collegium Musicum. Attendance was limited to 30,000 visitors.

==== 2011 ====
The Pohoda Festival 2011 took place from Thursday 7 until Saturday 9 July 2011. Most notable acts for 2011: Moby, Portishead, Madness, Pulp, Lamb, Peter Bjorn and John, Santigold, M.I.A., Public Image Ltd, Imogen Heap, Rusko, Magnetic Man, Beirut and Dirtyphonics.

==== 2012 ====
The Pohoda Festival 2012 took place from Thursday 5 until Saturday 7 July 2012. Most notable acts for 2012: Kasabian, Lou Reed, Kooks, Elbow, Two Door Cinema Club, Orbital, Anna Calvi, Emilíana Torrini, Aloe Blacc, Public Enemy, Yann Tiersen and Bat for Lashes.

==== 2013 ====
The Pohoda Festival 2013 took place from Thursday 11 until Saturday 13 July 2013. Most notable acts for 2013: Atoms for Peace, Kaiser Chiefs, Bloc Party, Nick Cave and the Bad Seeds, Smashing Pumpkins, Amon Tobin, Kate Nash, Justice and Django Django.

==== 2014 ====
The Pohoda Festival 2014 took place from Thursday 10 until Saturday 12 July 2014. Most notable acts for 2014: Kraftwerk, Suede, Kelis, Tame Impala, Travis, Tricky, Azealia Banks, Goldfrapp, Mogwai, Disclosure, Moderat.

==== 2015 ====
The Pohoda Festival 2015 took place from Thursday 9 until Saturday 11 July 2015. Most notable acts for 2015: Björk, Manu Chao, Die Antwoord, FFS, Einstürzende Neubauten, CocoRosie, Eagles of Death Metal, Of Montreal, Kae Tempest.

==== 2016 ====
Pohoda Festival 2016 took place from Thursday 7 until Saturday 9 July 2016. Most notable acts for 2016: The Prodigy, Sigur Rós, PJ Harvey, James Blake. Parov Stelar, Flying Lotus, The Vaccines, Savages, DJ Shadow. Róisín Murphy, Nina Kraviz, Gogol Bordello.

==== 2017 ====
Pohoda Festival 2017 took place from Thursday 6 July 2017 to Saturday 8 July 2017. Most notable acts for 2017: Solange, Alt-J, M.I.A., Ylvis, Birdy, The Jesus and Mary Chain, Jake Bugg, Boys Noize, Rodrigo y Gabriela, Slowdive, Future Islands.

==== 2018 ====
Pohoda Festival 2018 took place from Thursday 5 July 2018 to Saturday 7 July 2018. Most notable acts for 2018: The Chemical Brothers, St. Vincent, Jamie Cullum, Blossoms, Everything Everything, Ride, Jessie Ware, Ziggy Marley, Aurora, Rodriguez, LP, Danny Brown.

==== 2019 ====
Pohoda Festival 2019 took place from Thursday 11 July 2019 to Saturday 13 July 2019. Most notable acts for 2019: Liam Gallagher, The 1975, The Roots, Skepta, Charlotte Gainsbourg, Michael Kiwanuka, Mac DeMarco, Mura Masa, Little Big, Lola Marsh.

=== 2020s ===
==== 2020 ====
The twenty-fourth edition of Pohoda was postponed by a year due to the COVID-19 pandemic. Pohoda 2020 was replaced with Pohoda in the Air, a series of concerts and discussions streamed live from Trenčín Airport on 9–11 July 2020.

==== 2021 ====
Pohoda 2021 was originally supposed to take place from Thursday 8 July 2021 to Saturday 10 July 2021. Most notable acts confirmed for 2020 included FKA Twigs, The Libertines, Wolf Alice, Metronomy, Archive, Black Midi, Shame and Kokoroko. However, due to the ongoing pandemic and attendance limits on mass events, the event was replaced with a series of five one-day festivals titled Pohoda on the Ground, with the same headliners performing each day. The most notable acts included Dry Cleaning and Altın Gün.

==== 2022 ====
From Thursday 7 July 2022 to Saturday 9 July 2022. Headliners: Nick Cave & The Bad Seeds, The Libertines, Richie Hawtin, Flume, Metronomy, Wolf Alice, Black Pumas, Sigrid, Floating Points, Slowthai, Confidence Man, Paula Temple.

==== 2023 ====
In 2023, Pohoda took place for the 20th time at the airport in Trenčín. Date: from 6 to 8 July. Artists of the 26th edition of the festival: Central Cee, Jamie XX, Caroline Polachek, Ben Howard, Wet Leg, Arca, Suzanne Vega, Amelie Lens, Sofi Tukker, Shygirl, Perfume Genius, Sampa The Great, Dry Cleaning.

== External links and references ==
- Official website
