= Trenčín Airfield =

Trenčín Airfield Letisko Trenčín
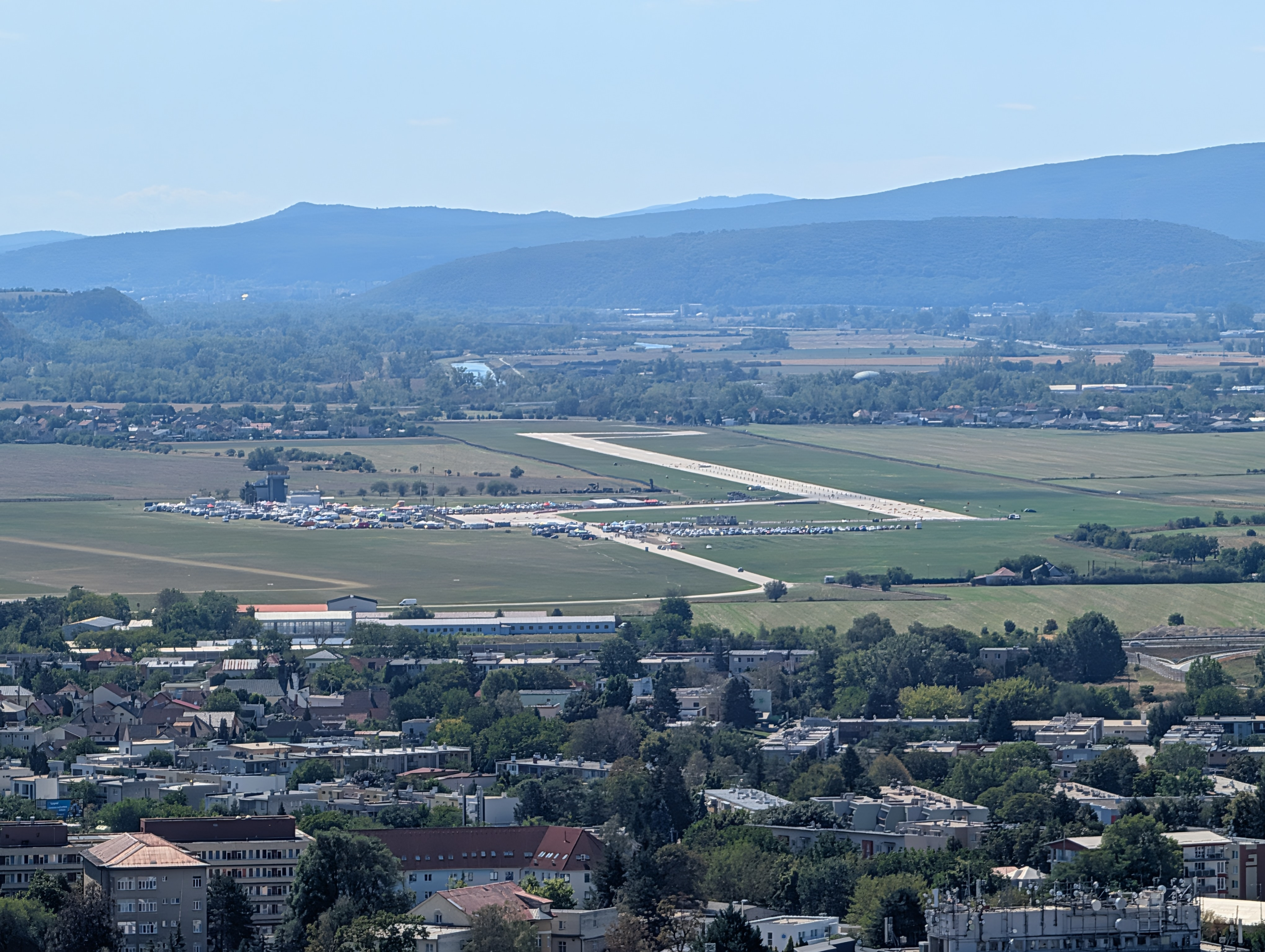
- IATA: QRN; ICAO: LZTN

Summary
- Airport type: non-public / Military
- Serves: Trenčín, Slovakia
- Elevation AMSL: 676 ft (206 m)
- Coordinates: 48°51′54″N 017°59′32″E
- Interactive map of Trenčín Airfield

Runways
Direction	Length		Surface
Direction	m	ft	Surface
04/22	2,000	6,562	Concrete
03/21	985	3,230	Grass/Dirt

Trenčín Airfield (ICAO: LZTN) serves Trenčín, a city in the Trenčín Region of Slovakia.

== Airlines and destinations ==
As of 20 June 2024, there are no scheduled passenger services to/from Trenčín Airfield.

== Festival Pohoda ==
Since 2004, Trenčín Airfield has been the site of the Pohoda music and culture festival.
