= Katarzyna Mycka =

Katarzyna Mycka (born 1972) is a Polish marimba player and percussionist.

== Biography ==
Mycka studied at the Stanislaw Moniuszko Music Academy in Gdansk with residencies in Stuttgart and Salzburg. She was the first female soloist at the First World Marimba Festival in Osaka in 1998 and at the International Marimba Festival in Linz in 2004. She has performed as a solo guest with the Stuttgart Philharmonic Orchestra, the Württemberg Chamber Orchestra Heilbronn, the Beijing Symphony Orchestra, the Vienna Chamber Orchestra, the Neubrandenburger Philharmoniker, the Philharmonischen Orchester Erfurt, the Slovak Philharmonic, with the Novosibirsk Philharmonic Orchestra, as well as with the Polish Baltic Philharmonic, Łódź Philharmonic, Szczecin Philharmonic, Opole Philharmonic of Poland, and the Sudecka Philharmonic.

In 1999 the Polish Percussive Arts Society conferred upon her the designation "Ambassador of Polish Percussive Arts" followed by an endowment from the Kunststiftung Baden-Württemberg as well as an invitation to international concerts and masterclasses in places such the US, Japan, China, Taiwan, and Mexico. Mycka's debut in America was at the Percussive Arts Society International Convention in Anaheim, Los Angeles. She received further invitations to their international conventions in 2001 and 2008 in the US. She has been the president of the German chapter of the Percussive Arts Societysince 2005.

Mycka has been an adjudicator at international percussion competitions since 1999. She has been a juror in 1999 and 2002 for the International Percussion Competition Luxembourg, in 2000 for the First World Marimba Competition Stuttgart in Warsaw, in 2001 at the percussion competition in Ostrava, in 2004 at the Jugend musiziert ("youth play music") German federal-state competition in Villingen-Schwenningen, in 2005 at the Pendim Foundation International Competition For Percussion Instruments in Plovdiv, Bulgaria, and in 2006 at the International Marimba Competition in Linz.

Since October 2006, Mycka has been teaching at the Ignacy Jan Paderewski Academy of Music in Poznań. It is the first academy in Poland that one can complete a major in marimba as the field of study. Every two years since 2003, she has put on the "International Katarzyna Myćka Marimba Academy". In 2003, 2005, and 2007 it was in Wrocław, in 2009 in Frankfurt, 2011 in Nuremberg, 2013 at the Conservatoire de Luxembourg, 2015 in Hannover, and in 2017 the well-known and successful academy scheduled to continue in Arcata, California, the home of the Marimba One instrument manufacturer.

== Competitions and prizes ==
- 1991 - First Prize, Opole Percussion Competition, Opole, Poland
- 1992 - Special prize (scholarship) to study abroad, from the Geneva International Music Competition
- 1995 - First Prize and Audience Prize at the „International Percussion Competition Luxembourg“
- 1996 - First Prize, „First World Marimba Competition Stuttgart“
- 1997 - Finalist ARD-competition in Munich
- 2006 - Soloist of the Year at the Neubrandenburg Philharmonic Orchestra's Concert Series

== Discography ==
- Marimba Spiritual (Süddeutscher Rundfunk Stuttgart, 1997)
- Marimba Dance (Südwestdeutscher Rundfunk, 1999)
- Marimba Concerto (Saarländischer Rundfunk, 2001)
- Marimba Sculpture (Südwestdeutscher Rundfunk, 2003)
- J. S. Bach - Marimba Concertos (Classic Concert Records, 2005)
- „Marimba Classica“ (Südwestdeutscher Rundfunk, 2008)
