= Reg Kehoe and his Marimba Queens =

Film still from A Study in Brown

Reg Kehoe and his Marimba Queens was an American musical group active from the late 1930s to the mid-1950s, which featured several female marimba players. They were based in Lancaster, Pennsylvania and toured extensively.

The lasting legacy of Reg Kehoe and his Marimba Queens is in A Study In Brown, a two-minute black-and-white film made in early 1940 (link below). One of hundreds of "Soundie" films, they were printed backwards (mirror image) so they could appear correct when played in a Panoram machine (an early film jukebox about the size of a refrigerator) which employed a series of mirrors to reflect an image from a projector onto a 27-inch, reverse-projection, etched-glass screen in the tight, enclosed cabinet.

"A Study In Brown" was also shown in movie houses as a bonus before the main feature. Reg Kehoe and His Marimba Queens played from about 1938 to 1955 and was a popular act, starting and ending each yearly tour with appearances at Hersheypark in Hershey, Pennsylvania. In between, the troupe played along the East Coast and throughout the Midwest, traveling by bus, making the rounds of the major dance halls—including in Chicago The Aragon, Willowbrook (Oh Henry Ballroom), Melody Mill, Midway Gardens and Trianon.

Stealing the show in "A Study In Brown" was 'hep-cat' bass player Frank DiNunzio, Sr., of Hershey, Pennsylvania, who played his standup–slap bass almost until his death in February 2005. The woman playing the marimba next to the maraca player, Grace Bailey, in the film is Reg's wife, Fern Marie, who died in July 2006. On the back marimba is Joyce Shaw on the upper, Ruth Hauser on the middle octave, and Janet Yonder on the lower. On the side marimba, Madee Greer is on the upper and Polly Weiser on the lower.

The reappearance of a grainy copy of the haunting "A Study In Brown"—which is now in the public domain—on Internet video sites has sparked a resurgence in curiosity and interest, and has rekindled the band's fame. Most viewers notice the sound is not necessarily synched to the video. This is because when making Soundies the artist first recorded an acceptable copy of the audio, then various camera takes were made using different camera angles and closeups as the performers lip-synched the lyrics and acted as though playing the instruments. The results were edited to create the appearance of several cameras doing the filming, when in most cases one camera was used. This films was shown at many Army Camps.

No other Panoram recordings made by Reg Kehoe and his Marimba Queens are known to exist. Thanks to their two-minute "soundie", the legacy of the Marimba Queens lives on.

The band played its last engagement at the Bedford Springs Hotel, Bedford, Pennsylvania in 1962.

NOTE: Reg Kehoe and his Marimba Queens did make additional recordings in the 1940s. There are 18 "glass" records of music and two "glass" records of live interviews with Kehoe and some of the band members.

== Personnel ==
- Madee Greer (left marimba)
- Polly Weiser (left marimba)
- Joyce Shaw (center marimba)
- Ruth Hauser (center marimba)
- Janet Yoder (center marimba)
- Fern Marie Kehoe (right marimba)
- Grace Bailey Ivanov (maracas)
- Reg Kehoe (marimba, electric vibraphone)
- Frank DiNunzio, Sr. (double bass)

(Note: Positions are reversed in the movie)
