= François Du Bois =

French composer, professor and writer

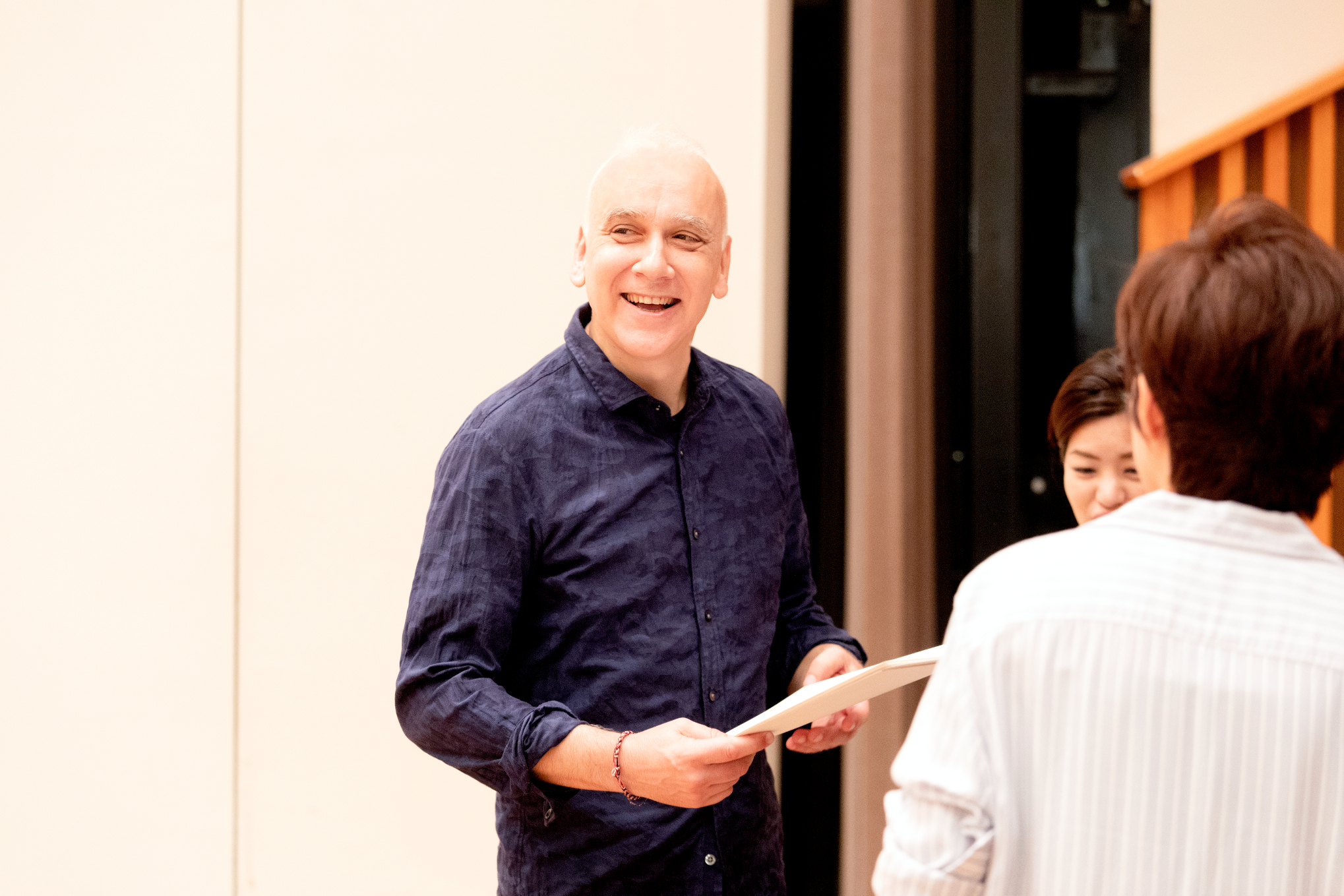
- Born: La Charité-sur-Loire, Burgundy, France
- Occupations: Composer, marimba virtuoso, professor, columnist, author

François Du Bois, born in La Charité-sur-Loire in Burgundy, France, is a composer, marimba virtuoso, as well as professor, columnist and author.

== Musical debut ==
Du Bois began to learn music when he was 8 years old. By the age of 17, he had already become a professional. At 16 years old, François Du Bois embarked upon a career path as a symphonic orchestra percussionist and a jazz drummer, which he pursued until he was 26. In the classical field, he has worked with Lorin Maazel, Olivier Messiaen, and Mstislav Rostropovich, and in the field of jazz, he has worked with Richard Galliano, Trilok Gurtu, Dominique Di Piazza, and Abbey Lincoln.

=== A detour ===
Dissatisfied with the lack of artistic substance in his music, Du Bois left France at the age of 20 for Africa, in search of experience and inspiration that would lend his music greater substance, a journey that led him to Burkina Faso. During his first year there, Du Bois caught malaria, but he fully recovered. Several years later, Du Bois' musical education had become complete after having studied under his mentor, Ray Lema. Lema is an African singer and composer who founded the National Ballet of Zaire (today Democratic Republic of the Congo).

== Career as a marimbist and composer ==
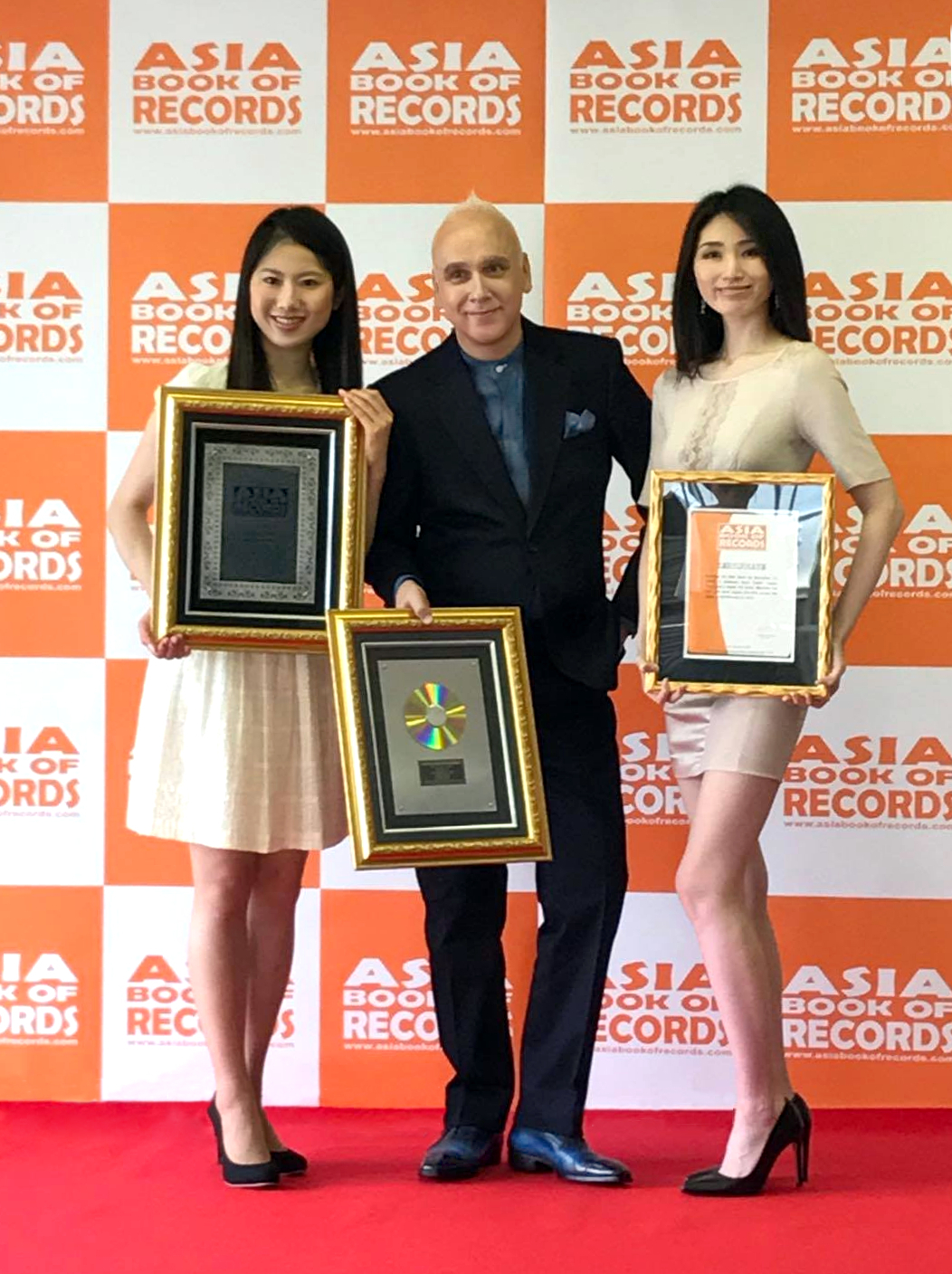
Francois Du Bois World Record Ceremony. Tokyo, June 2017.

Du Bois played in a duet with the Canadian violinist Hélène Collerette, who is currently the premier soloist of the Orchestre Philharmonique de Radio France. Later he played in a duet with the Australian violinist Jane Peters—winner of the Tchaikovsky Prize—in a concert tour through Germany. He also performed with the pianist Ludovic Selmi, in concert tours throughout Europe and Japan. The two of them collaborated with Les Tambours du Bronx, among other groups. After the dissolution of the duo, Du Bois began to concentrate on composing music and recording it.

=== Other duets created by François Du Bois ===
- Marimba /oboe — with François Leleux, virtuoso and former soloist of the Bayerischer Rundfunk (Symphonic orchestra of the Bavarian Radio station) / Lorin Maazel, Conductor.
- Marimba / clarinet — with Patrick Messina, virtuoso and soloist of the “Orchestre National de France” / Kurt Masur, Conductor.
- Marimba / cello — with Henri Demarquette, virtuoso.
- Marimba / shakuhachi (Japanese flute) — with Hōzan Yamamoto, virtuoso and professor at Tokyo Geijyutsu Daigaku “Tokyo National University of Fine Arts and Music”.
- Marimba / violin — with Jean-Marc Phillips-Varjabédian, virtuoso.

In 1998, Du Bois left Paris for Tokyo on a quest to discover new horizons in the field of music. Keio University invited Du Bois to create a special class in musical composition for the Political Science department. That same year, he created the “Orchestre d’autre part”, an ensemble that consisted of 14 marimbists and taiko players. Keiko Abe, a key person in the development of the marimba, introduced Du Bois to two of her former students with whom he would record the album “Origine”. Soon after the album's release, NHK broadcast a live 30-minute programme “Studio Park: François Du Bois Special” that reached 10 million viewers during primetime.

In 2013, François Du Bois composed a double album, recorded in October of that year at the Meguro Fudoson Buddhist temple, accompanied by the temple monks. Out of their collaboration arose a new sound to stimulate meditation. The music was inspired by the Chinese concepts of “Liu Zi Jue” and “Medita Music”. In September 2014, Columbia Records released the corresponding double CD Dive Into Silence.

In June 2017, "Dive into Silence - Eclaircie" was granted the world record for the world's most sold marimba CD (80,300 copies) by the Asian Book of Records.

His 2nd medita music album "Gunung Kawi" was released as an exclusivity for the purchasers of his book "The Science of Composition" published in September 2019 from Kodansha Bluebacks. This book has become a best seller.

He composed the music for the film "La Traversée", which received the Oumarou Ganda Prize in the FESPACO 2021 festival

In 2022, he released his new book in the Kodansha Bluebacks Editions (scientific collection) "The science of musical instruments" (multiple editions).

The same year, the album "La légende de la forêt" was released, a quartet of original compositions for meditation. Source of inspiration: the forests inhabited by the Tengu.

Following the best-selling editions of both "The Science of Composition" and "The Science of Musical Instruments, a combined edition was published on June 24, 2022.

== Awards and accolades ==
- City of Paris award in percussion music, first place by unanimous vote.
- Laureate of the Fondation de France.
- Ordre des Palmes Académiques: gold medal in music, presented at the Palace of the Senate, 1993.

== The Marimba Manuals ==
François Du Bois is the author of a complete three-volume manual of playing the marimba: The 4 Mallet Marimba, distributed by IMD. Keiko Abe remarked in the preface, “This method's pedagogical approach—a product of a certain creativity—is an invaluable contribution to the study of the marimba.” The method is available in French, English, and Japanese.

== Discography ==
- TBMT: 2 pianos / 2 percussions.
- Entre deux mondes: with Ray Lema, Richard Galliano, François Leleux, Dominique Di Piazza, and Daniel Goyone.
- L'Heure nuptiale: for the pipe organ of La Madeleine church in Paris, France.
- DP4: with the shakuhachi player Hōzan Yamamoto.
- Marimba night: Live performance with the Orchestre d'autre part.
- Origine: trio of 2 marimbas and 1 taiko.
- Dive into silence: Nippon Columbia, double CD 2014.
- Dive into silence-Premium (Éclaircie): Makino Shuppan/D-Project, single CD 2015.
- Invited to play on the albums "Lueurs bleue" and "Il y a de l'Orange dans le bleu" of Daniel Goyone, with Trilok Gurtu and Louis Sclavis.
- Gunung Kawi：D-Project/Kodansha 2019. Exclusive album for purchasers of the book "The Science of Composition" (see books), and not for sale.
- La légende de la forêt: D-Project/Joy Foundation 2022

== Films ==
- Lost in Translation (Du Bois in the role of the pianist), directed by Sofia Coppola.
- La Traversée (Du Bois composed the soundtrack) directed by Irène Tassembédo

== Du Bois Method ==
Capitalising on his experience in education, music, and martial arts, François Du Bois established the method of career management that bears his name. He first employed the Du Bois Method in the Personal Career Management class he was giving at Keio University, in which many people, including Carlos Ghosn, participated in order to share their knowledge.

In 2003, Du Bois began to lead a seminar called Personal Career Design — Du Bois Method at Academyhills, adapting his approach to suit a general audience. Since 2005 his company, D-Project, has managed the Du Bois Method seminars.

The Du Bois Method focuses on improving the creativity and energy of both entrepreneurs and employees through balancing the physical and mental condition, as well as intelligence and sensibility. Seminars are based on four steps: games; physical exercise based on Chinese martial arts and Chinese traditional medicine; discussion in a psychologically-controlled environment, and African music.

Du Bois's books cover the practical application of the Du Bois Method to everyday life.

Since 2012, Du Bois has taught a class on the Du Bois Method at "Attackers Business School", Kenichi Ohmae's prestigious business school based in Tokyo

== Martial arts ==
Du Bois is also well known for his practice of Kung-fu. He received the title of "first international successor of Wudangshan internal martial arts" in 2009, after undergoing training in the Wudangshan Mountains in 2008–2009. Du Bois created the first Wudang Kung-fu school in Tokyo. At the fourth World Kung-fu Championships in 2010, his team earned one gold medal, one silver medal and two bronze medals. For the 2012 competition, Du Bois was selected as the leader of the Japanese delegation that comprised 94 athletes; his own team of six competitors took home seven bronze medals.

== Journalism ==
- Yomiuri Shimbun — 2003–2004 Columnist for Asian culture with "Yomiuri Weekly".
- Asahi Shimbun — 2005–2006 Columnist specialising in career planning "AERA English".
- Japan Times — 2007 Columnist specialising in career planning.
- Nihon Keizai Shimbun — 2008–2009 Columnist for "Ecolomy".
- Asahi Shimbun — 2010–2011 Columnist for "Job Labo".
- Ie no Hikari — 2011–2012 Columnist.
- Nikkei Shimbun — January 12, 2015. Music critic on “Dive Into Silence”: “An art where Japan, France and China are molded into a singular personality".
- YUHOBIKA — February 19, 2015. Special 15-page feature on "Dive Into Silence" and its effects, explained by Dr. Nobuaki Shinohara. A special CD was enclosed “Dive Into Silence – Premium - Eclaircie”.
- Adomachic Tengoku — February 21, 2015. Documentary on TV Tokyo featuring the recording of "Dive Into Silence”.
- Japan Times — March 14, 2016. Article in the section of career development entitled "From marimba to careers"

== Books ==
- You Can Have A Much Better Life!, published by Mikasashobo in Japanese, ISBN 4837956688.
- How To Get Your Best Partner, published by Graph-sha in Japanese, ISBN 4766209788.
- The Book to Reform Yourself, published by WAVE Publishers in Japanese, prefaced by Kenichiro Mogi, physicist and brain researcher, with the official recommendation of Yoshito Hori, C.E.O. of Globis Group, and international director of the Harvard Business School alumni association, ISBN 4872902769.
- The Amazing Art of Management by Top Foreign Executives Never Revealed to the Japanese, published by Kodansha in Japanese, with Carlos Ghosn as the main guest contributor, ISBN 4062820498.
- How Du Bois Thinks, published by Diamond-sha in Japanese, ISBN 4478005958.
- The 1% Who Choose the Right Path, published by Seishunshuppan in Japanese, ISBN 4413036905.
- The Du Bois Method: How to Find Your Hidden Talent That Will Change Your Destiny, published by Magazine House in Japanese, ISBN 4838721676.
- Important Things to Consider And Things Not Worth Considering That Will Lead to a Rich Life, published by Diamond-sha in Japanese, ISBN 4478014213.
- Move Your Body And You Will Find the Answers to Your Questions, published by Seishunshuppan in Japanese, ISBN 4413037952.
- Life's Treasures, Taught by Taichi: 90 Days in the Wudang Mountains, published by Kodansha in Japanese, ISBN 4062770644.
- A French Master Teaches You 49 Key Points to Express Your Sensibility, published by GyeMyeongSa in Korean, ISBN 978-89-7256-105-7.
- How to Think, How to Live: Career Design Specialist François Du Bois Talks with International C.E.O.s, published by New World Press in Chinese, ISBN 978-7-5104-2549-3.
- The Science of Composition: Theories and rules to create beautiful music, published by Kodansha in Japanese (multiple editions), ISBN 4065172829
- The science of musical instruments: The structures and mechanics of instruments to give elaborated sounds, published by Kodansha in Japanese (multiple editions), ISBN 9784065264478
