= Ju Percussion Group =

Taiwanese percussion ensemble

Ju Percussion Group (JPG; Chinese: 朱宗慶打擊樂團; pinyin: jhuzongcìngdǎ jí yuètuán) is the first professional percussion ensemble in Taiwan, established on January 2, 1986.

With four main objectives: performance, education, research, and promotion, the group is committed to sustainable development. It has expanded its activities by establishing the Ju Percussion Group Foundation and the Ju Percussion Music School. Additionally, the group has hosted events such as the "Taiwan International Percussion Convention" and the "Taipei International Percussion Summer Camp".

To date, the group has performed in over 3,000 concerts and toured in many countries, including Europe, the Americas, Asia, and Australia, reaching 34 countries and regions around the world. Ju Percussion Music School has nourished more than 150,000 percussion learners.

== History ==
Ju Percussion Group, established on January 2, 1986, is recognized as Taiwan's first professional percussion ensemble. The group blends traditional and modern elements, drawing inspiration from local and international influences to create a unique style. Its operations are guided by four main objectives: performance, education, research, and promotion. Every year, the group showcases grand-scale performances, produces new works, and commissions ongoing compositions.

The founder and artistic director, Ju Tzong-Ching, established the ensemble to share the beauty of percussion art and promote international perspectives. To ensure sustainable growth, the group established the Ju Percussion Foundation and Ju Percussion Music School in 1989. The foundation introduced professional arts administration to provide dedicated support for the ensemble's development. In 1991, the Ju Percussion Music School was inaugurated to promote foundational percussion education. Currently, the school operates 21 teaching centers in Taiwan and an additional 24 teaching centers worldwide, serving a community of over 150,000 learners.

The “Jumping Percussion Group” was founded in 1999 and later renamed “Ju Percussion Group 2” in 2005, becoming the second ensemble of the JPG. The group, consisting of percussion majors from different Taiwanese universities and colleges, emphasizes experimentation and innovation. They engage in educational outreach and performances, regularly featuring children's concerts that visit numerous cities throughout Taiwan and China. The Jumping Percussion Group is the third ensemble, primarily dedicated to campus outreach performances.

The Juvenile Percussion Ensemble, founded in 2000 as a club-based ensemble for young students aged 10 to 18, has experienced remarkable growth over the years. It has expanded to over 100 ensembles across Taiwan as of 2023 and receives guidance from members of the JPG and dedicated instructors. In 2014, the ensemble formed the JUT Percussion Group, which composed of full-time instructors and regularly hosts concerts.

The first Taipei International Percussion Convention was founded in 1993 to promote Taiwan’s percussion music’s global presence. In 2011, the event expanded its scope to include performances in various cities throughout Taiwan and was officially renamed the Taiwan International Percussion Convention (TIPC). It invites internationally renowned ensembles and percussionists to perform in Taiwan, aiming to introduce percussion music to a broader Taiwanese audience and present world-class percussion groups. As of May 2023, the TIPC has organized 11 editions.

During the group's 30th-anniversary celebration in 2016, Ju Tzong-Ching, the founder and artistic director, received a prestigious honor by being selected for the PAS Hall of Fame. This award made Ju the first person from the Chinese-speaking community to receive this prestigious honor.

With the support of the ceramic brand "Cilin," the group established the "Ju Percussion Group Laboratory" Innovation Incubation Program. This program nurtures percussionists under 35 by offering guidance, resource connections, curriculum support, and financial assistance.

On the evening of December 25, 2022, a fire engulfed the warehouse rented by the JPG in Bali District, New Taipei City. The blaze destroyed all musical instruments, accessories, sets, historical documents, and commemorative archives stored inside. In response to the incident, the group promptly implemented contingency measures to ensure that performance and related activities proceeded as scheduled and maintained their expected quality. In the aftermath, the group is now developing a comprehensive plan for rebuilding and sustainable development.

== International performances and artistic reviews ==
The JPG has performed in numerous countries, including Europe, America, Asia, and Australia. In 2014, they embarked on a European tour, holding concerts in Austria, Germany, and Hungary, with a debut performance at the Vienna Musikverein. In 2016, during the group's 30th-anniversary, they took the stage at venues in Brussels, Amsterdam, Berlin, and London. In 2017, they were invited for the third time to participate in the Chekhov International Theatre Arts Festival in Moscow, where they performed the percussion theater piece "Mulan." In November 2022, marking its first international activity since the global COVID-19 pandemic, they traveled to the United States to participate in the Percussive Arts Society International Convention (PASIC) and held a special concert.

The ensemble has been invited to participate in various international events and festivals. They performed at the Paris Summer Arts Festival in France, the Budapest Spring Arts Festival in Hungary, the World Expo in Japan, the Chekhov International Theatre Arts Festival in Moscow, the Shanghai International Arts Festival in China, the National Centre for the Performing Arts Percussion Festival in Beijing, the Sarihara International Performing Arts Festival in Indonesia, the Huayi Festival in Singapore, the Bangkok International Dance and Music Festival in Thailand, and the Percussion Pulse Art Festival in Denmark.

Furthermore, they have also performed at renowned venues including the Twin Oaks Estate in Washington, D.C., and the Queen Elizabeth Theatre in Canada. Additionally, they have collaborated with orchestras such as the Shanghai Symphony Orchestra, the Guangzhou Symphony Orchestra, the China Philharmonic Orchestra, and the Shenzhen Symphony Orchestra to present full percussion concerto performances.

The JPG has received acclaim and recognized by various media outlets and organizations. The New York Times praised the group for its "high enthusiasm, vitality, and highly competitive members." The Lawrence Journal-World highlighted its "outstanding musicality and excellent performances... Their personality traits add a joyful atmosphere to their performances." The Percussive Arts Society acknowledged its "rapid expansion in music education and outstanding achievements in promoting percussion music." Channel One Russia featured a special report describing its percussion theater production "Mulan" as a blend of Chinese opera and modern European drama, symbolizing the emergence of a fusion of traditional and contemporary Asian art.
