= Bogdan Bacanu =

Bogdan Băcanu
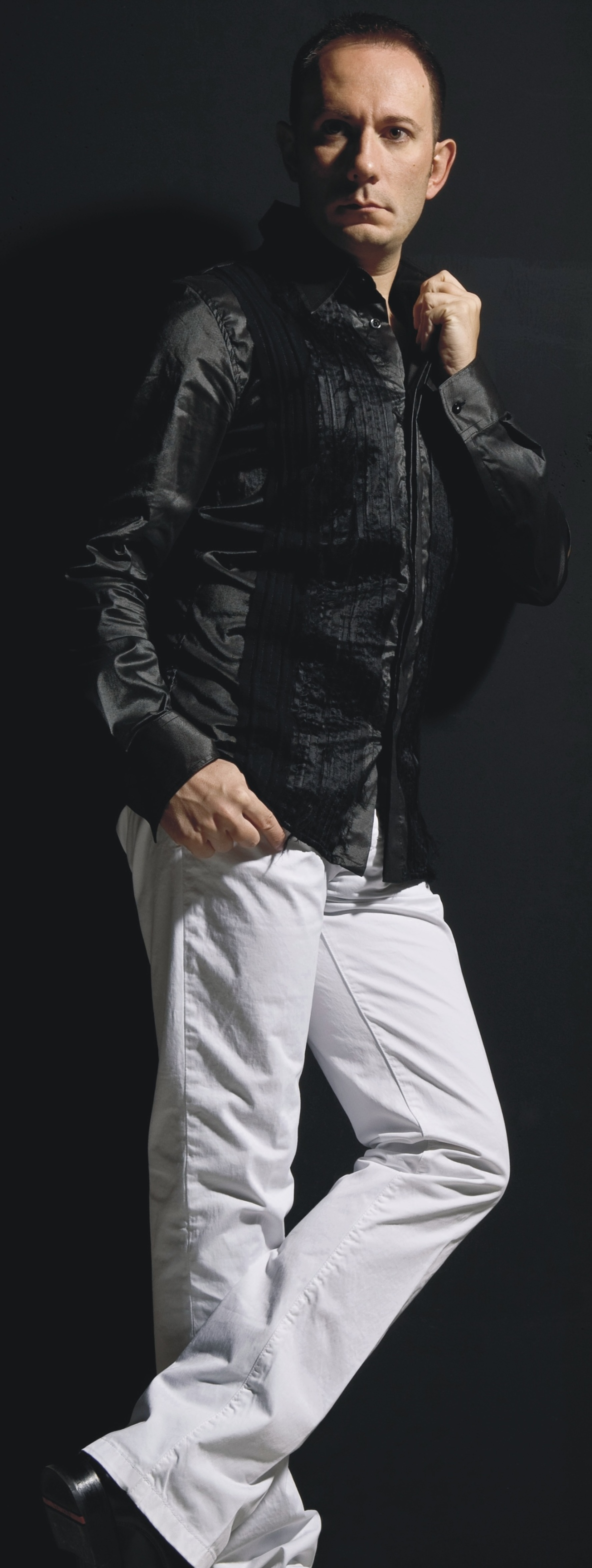
- Bogdan Băcanu

Background information
- Born: 1975 (age 50–51); Bucharest, Romania
- Occupations: Musician, professor
- Instrument: Marimba
- Years active: 1988-present
- Labels: CC Records
- Website: www.bogdanbacanu.com

International Marimba Soloist, Bogdan Băcanu (born 1975 in Bucharest, Romania) became a professor for marimba at the famous Anton Bruckner Private University in Linz (Austria) at just 23 years old of age.

== Biography ==
He has been professor of marimba at the famous Anton Bruckner Private University in Linz (Austria) starting when he was 23 and is thus the youngest professor of his kind, world-wide. He was given piano instruction at the age of five in Bucharest, his birthplace, and was already a percussionist with the George Enescu Bucharest Philharmonic at age 13. Bogdan Bácanu studied marimba at the Mozarteum University in his present hometown with his great mentor, Professor Peter Sadlo.

Since then, Bogdan Băcanu has given solo concerts and concertos with orchestra and ensembles, touring in Norway, Denmark, the Netherlands, England, Germany, France, Spain, Romania, Cyprus, Greece, Japan, Korea, China, Australia, Canada, Turkey, Switzerland, Mexico and the United States. He has performed with well-known artists like Keiko Abe, Gidon Kremer and Peter Sadlo. In a variety of concert projects, he has collaborated with conductors like Dennis Russell Davies, Cristian Mandeal and Horia Andreescu, among others, and orchestras like the Bucharest Philharmonic and various radio symphony orchestras like the RSO Bucharest. Renowned, international awards and exuberant concert reviews from around the world have continued to attend his career as soloist and educator in equal measure.

A close partnership teams him up with Momoko Kamiya, the Japanese marimba player, in concerts, master classes and CD recordings.

He has been invited repeatedly to renowned music festivals such as the Biennale in Brisbane (Australia), the Princeton Marimba Festival, the Percussion Festival of Salonika, the Lockenhaus Music Festival, Voices of Percussion Vienna, World Marimba Festival of Osaka, 'Les museiques' Festival Basel/Switzerland, Salzburg Festival Inaugural Concert, 2nd International Marimba Competition 2004 in Belgium, 2005 in Slovenia, International Percussion Competition PENDIM in Plovdiv / Bulgaria, Zeltsman Marimba Festival in the USA, International Marimba Festival in Tuxtla Gutiérrez, Mexico where he gave concerts to great critical acclaim.

Bogdan Bácanu is a lecturer at the International Summer Academy in Salzburg, and was guest professor at the Zeltsman Marimba Festival, USA, at the 4th International Marimba Festival 2004 in Tuxtla Gutiérrez, Mexico and was invited by distinguished universities and festivals to give master classes in The Netherlands, Germany, France, Spain, Switzerland, Romania, Cypress, Greece, Japan, Australia, Turkey, Mexico as well as the USA.

As the artistic director of the Linz International Marimba Festival, he has created a regularly recurrent cultural event.

Due to the resounding, continual success of his festivals, he then founded the International Marimba Competition in Linz in 2006, featuring a prestigious jury. From 2009 on, the competition is triannually held in cooperation with the Mozarteum University and the Mozarteum Summer Academy in Salzburg.

Composers like John Thrower (Canada/Germany), Alexander Mullenbach (Luxembourg/Austria) and Emmanuel Sejourne (France) have written pieces and concertos dedicated to him which he has released in part on his CDs.

Bogdan Bácanu himself loves and respects the compositions of Johann Sebastian Bach. His greatest desire is to see the marimba established in the music world as a solo instrument. His arrangements of the Concertos BWV 1060 to BWV 1062 for harpsichord demonstrate his respect for the original composition by absolute adherence to the text, shown on his newest CD release, in which he shares the stage with “The Wave Quartet”, Peter Sadlo (conductor) and the Salzburg Baroque Orchestra. Even Baroque music specialists were enthusiastic in regards to the perfection and the rich sounds of the marimba in works by J.S. Bach. Further arrangements by Bácanu like the Chaconne in d-minor BWV 1004 and the Concertos for Harpsichord, BWV 1052, 1054 and 1056 have been released on CD and also as music scores with the Norwegian edition, NORSK.

Bogdan Băcanu performs exclusively on ADAMS Artist Classic Custom Marimbas.

The renowned instrument manufacturer (Adams Musical Instruments)has developed a unique ‘Bogdan Bácanu Signature Series’ of marimba mallets with Bogdan Bácanu, named after him.

His highly successful cooperation with Classic Concert Records since 2004 is evidence to this artist’s versatility.

== Discography ==
=== Solo ===
- Marimba d’Amore (2004, CC Records)

=== with Guests ===
- J. S. Bach – Marimba Concertos (2005 with Katarzyna Mycka, Radio Orchestra Bucharest)
- Rhythms Of Life (2006 with Momoko Kamiya, Kassandra Dimopoulou, Salzburg Solisten Orchestra)
- True Colours (2006 with Salzburg Solisten Orchestra)
- Aurora Borealis (2008 with Vladimir Petrov, Emiko Uchiyama, Christoph Sietzen)
- Marimbas & Orchestra (2009 with Vladimir Petrov, Emiko Uchiyama, Christoph Sietzen, Peter Sadlo - Conductor, Salzburg Barock - Orchestra)

== Published works ==
- J. S. Bach – Harpsichord Concertos arranged for Marimba (2006 Norsk Musikforlag, Norway)
- True Colours - Composed by John Thrower (JT Music Publishing, Germany)
- Rhythms Of Life - for Marimba and Orchestra - Composed by John Thrower (JT Music Publishing, Germany)
- Rhythms Of Life - for Marimba Solo - Composed by John Thrower (JT Music Publishing, Germany)
- Love Songs - for Two Marimbas and Soprano - Composed by John Thrower (JT Music Publishing, Germany)
- Just One World - for Two Marimbas and Soprano - Composed by John Thrower (JT Music Publishing, Germany)
- Alone - for Solo Marimba composed by Keiko Abe (Xebec Music Publishing, Japan)
- Concerto for Marimba and String Orchestra - Composed by Emmanuel Séjourné (2006 Norsk Musikforlag, Norway)
- Familiar - Composed by Matthias Schmitt (2006 Norsk Musikforlag, Norway)

== Composers who worked for B. Bacanu ==
- John Thrower
- Keiko Abe
- Emmanuel Séjourné
- Alexander Müllenbach
- Matthias Schmitt
- Eckhard Kopetzky
