= Wallgraben-Theater =

Theatre in Baden-Württemberg, Germany

Coordinates: 47°59′46″N 7°50′55″E

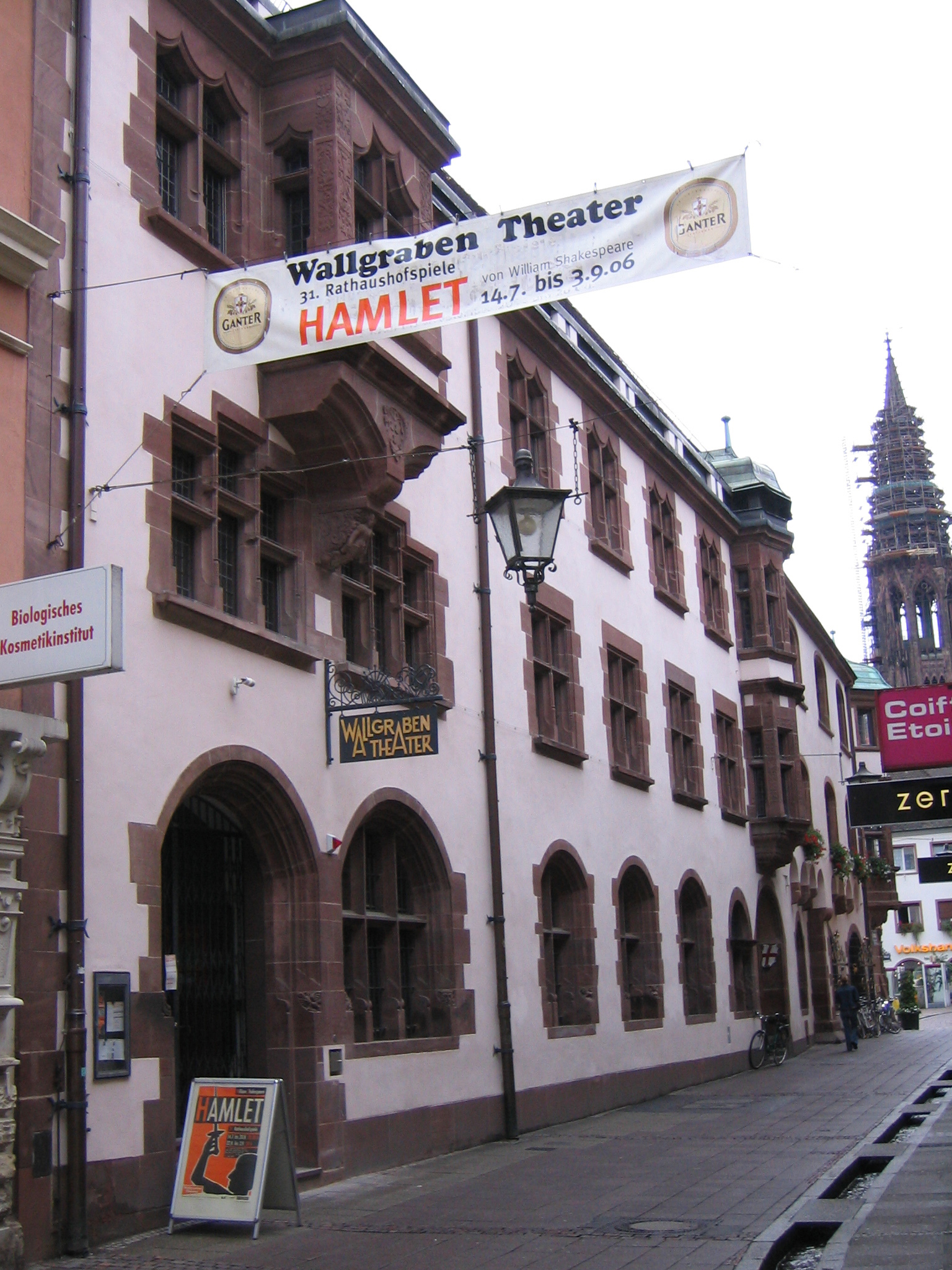
The Wallgraben-Theater

The Wallgraben-Theater (originally established as the Kleines Theater am Wallgraben) is a private cellar theatre company located in Freiburg im Breisgau, Baden-Württemberg, Germany. Holding a room seating capacity of around 60 to 100 people across rows of wooden benches, it is recognized as one of the oldest and most prominent independent private theatrical ensembles in Southwest Germany.

== History ==
The theatre group was first organized on June 16, 1953, by an independent collective of local university students. Its premiere performance was a production of Christopher Fry's stage drama A Sleep of Prisoners (German: Ein Schlaf Gefangner). The venue initially operated inside a converted historic wine cellar and fallout air shelter situated in a residential courtyard along Wallstraße 22. Due to high humidity conditions impacting production equipment and costuming, a replacement facility was negotiated with municipal authorities.

On April 11, 1973, the theater permanently moved its central operations into the sub-level vaulted basement cellars underneath the New Town Hall (Neues Rathaus) along Rathausgasse 5a in the old town center of Freiburg. Audience members access the basement hall by descending a characteristic 28-step entrance from the main street level.

For decades, the creative management of the stage was led by artistic director Ingeborg Steiert (1933–1997) alongside prominent comedic actor Heinz Meier (died 2013). In 1975, under Meier's influence, the Wallgraben-Theater became the first live performance venue to adapt the iconic comedic television sketch works of German humorist Loriot for an auditorium stage audience.

Meier's niece, Regine Effinger, took over operational management in 2003. Since 2008, the venue has been co-owned and jointly directed by Effinger and her husband, actor Hans Poeschl.

== Productions and Tourism ==
The underground stage focuses primarily on contemporary dramas, classic comedies, satire, and literary readings. During the summer season, the company transitions out of the cellar vaults to organize open-air courtyard theater festivals inside the inner courtyard of the surrounding Town Hall building (Rathausinnenhof). The theatre is situated close to historic landmarks like the Freiburg Minster, making it a key fixture for cultural tourism in the Black Forest region.

== See also ==
- Freiburg im Breisgau
