= Percujove =

Spanish youth percussion orchestra

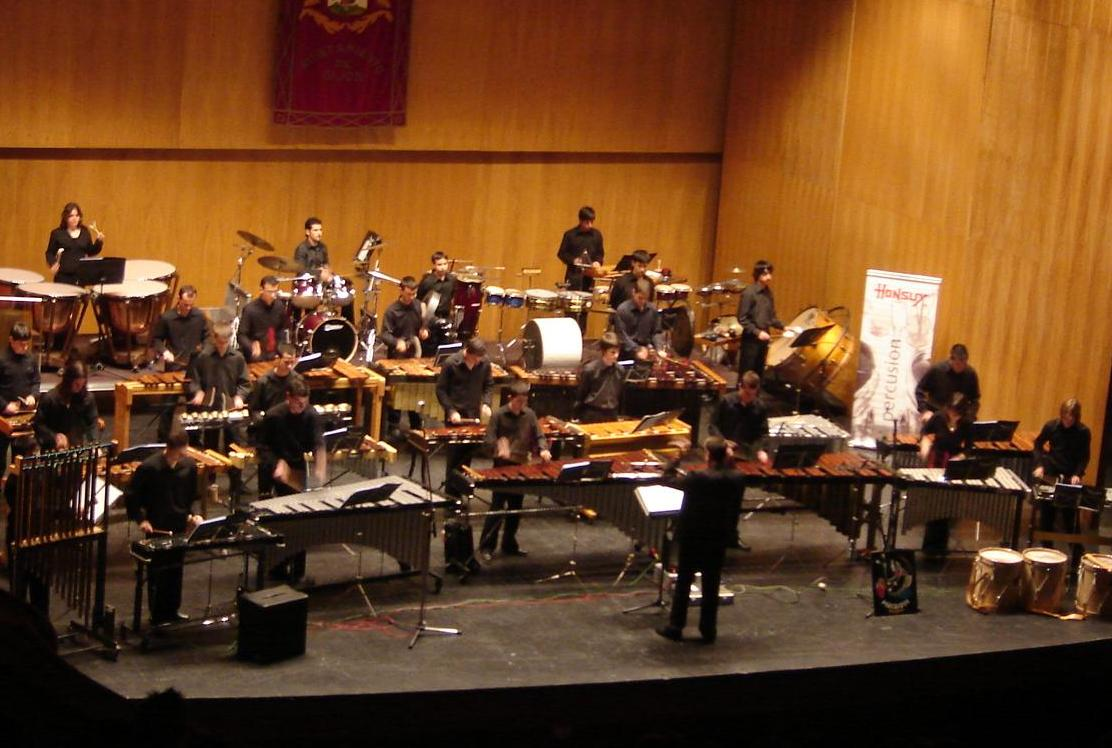
Concert at Jovellanos Theatre, Gijón (Spain), April 2006

Percujove (Valencian pronunciation: [ˌpeɾkuˈdʒove]) is a youth percussion orchestra. Created in June 2003, today it is composed of 25 young musicians, students of the José Iturbi Conservatorium of Valencia, Spain. The ensemble's conductor is Salvador Pelejero, of the Conservatorium.

Percujove is perhaps the only youth percussion orchestra in Europe.

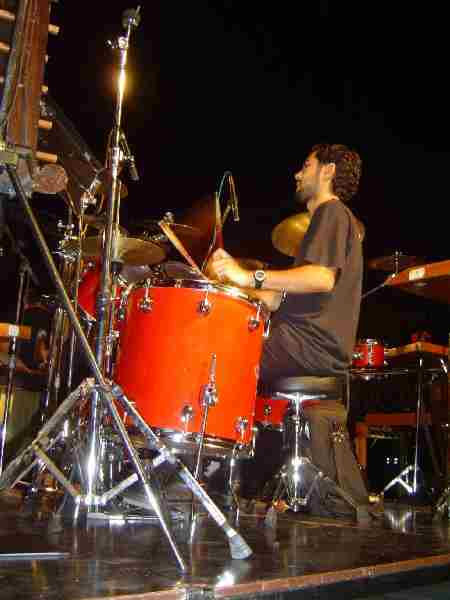
Sergi in concert: 26 July 2006 in Figueres, Spain

They have offered performances all around Europe, with concerts in Montpellier, Lyon, Copenhagen, Brussels, at the European Parliament in Strasbourg, at the European Space Agency in Noorwijk (Netherlands), and other concerts in Germany, France, Italy, Denmark, Norway, Slovenia, Slovakia, Belgium, Poland and Spain.

Percujove has also participated at the following music festivals:

- 14th Festival des Musiques d'Ici et d'Ailleurs de Châlons-en-Champagne (France).
- 11th Festival "Musique en vacances" de La Ciotat (France)
- "Les Dimanches de l'Ile Barbe" de Lyon (France)
- "Teatre, Música i Dansa a la Fresca" de Figueres (Girona, Spain) (2004–2006)
- 18th Setmana Internacional de Música (Setmana Jove) de Dénia (Alicante, Spain)
- Esbjerg Festuge Festival 2007 (Esbjerg, Denmark)
- Internasjornale Rytme & Dans Fest 2007 (Homborsund and Grimstad, Norway)
- 43rd Győr Summer - International Cultural Festival (Hungary)
- Summer Festival Velenje 2008 (Slovenia)
- Pohoda Festival 2008 and 2009 in Trenčín (Slovakia)
- Lipcowy Music Fest 2008 and 2009 in Katowice (Poland),
- 34th Summer of Culture Festival Bratislava 2009 (Slovakia)
- 15th Christopher Summer Festival 2009 in Vilnius (Lithuania)
- 3rd International Arts Festival 2009 in Mažeikiai (Lithuania)
- 8th Dainava music land festival 2009 in Alytus (Lithuania)

The ensemble performs pieces from many musical genres in its concerts, adapted by the group: baroque, vals, foxtrot, blues, and also zarzuela, pasodoble and other Spanish and Latino rhythms.
