= Kathryn Salfelder =

American classical composer

- Born: 1987
- Era: Contemporary

Kathryn Salfelder (born 1987 in Paterson, New Jersey) is a contemporary American composer, conductor and pianist, based in the Boston area. She has received commissions from the Albany Symphony, Boston Musica Viva, United States Air Force Band – Washington D.C., American Bandmasters Association, New York Virtuoso Singers, and Japan Wind Ensemble Conductors Conference (JWECC).

Awards include an ASCAP Morton Gould Young Composer Award, ASCAP/CBDNA Frederick Fennell Prize, Ithaca College Walter Beeler Memorial Composition Prize, and the USAF Colonel Arnald D. Gabriel Award. Her music has been performed by the Minnesota Orchestra, New England Philharmonic, Yale Philharmonia, and the Dallas Wind Symphony, and featured in over two hundred concerts at the nation’s leading universities and conservatories.

Salfelder was a Lecturer at MIT, and currently teaches composition and music history at the New England Conservatory

DMA, New England Conservatory. MM, Yale School of Music. BM, New England Conservatory. Studies with Michael Gandolfi, Aaron Jay Kernis, and David Lang.

== Compositions ==
=== Works for wind ensemble ===
- 2007 Cathedrals
- 2008 Laudate Dominum in Tympanis (an arrangement of a piece by Giovanni Pierluigi da Palestrina for 6 trumpets and 6 trombones)
- 2009 Crossing Parallels
- 2012 Ungrounded Base
- 2012 Stylus Phantasticus
- 2015 Shadows Ablaze (quoting Ockeghem's D'un autre amer)
- 2016 Prospect Hill (for brass ensemble)

=== Works for orchestra ===
- 2008 Dessin No. 1
- 2011 Lux Perpetua, for solo Soprano Saxophone and Orchestra

=== Solo and chamber music ===
- 2005 Two Etudes, for solo piano
- 2006 Three Fanfares, for brass quintet
- 2006 Permutations and iterations, for percussion duo
- 2008 Soliloquy, for solo flute
- 2009 Six Miniatures, for solo trumpet and wind quintet
- 2013 whispering into the night, for solo guitar
- 2013 Fanfare and Fugue, for trombone quartet
- 2013 Gold's Fool: A Tale of King Midas and the Golden Touch, for children's chorus, narrator, and chamber ensemble
- 2015 Stolen from Above, for saxophone quartet
- 2016 Disciples, for fl, cl, vln, vc, perc & pno

== Awards ==
- 2012 ASCAP Morton Gould Young Composer Award
- 2012 Tourjee Alumni Scholarship
- 2009 US Air Force Colonel Arnald D. Gabriel Award
- 2009 New England Conservatory Donald Martino Award for Excellence in Composition
- 2009 New England Conservatory George Chadwick Medal
- 2008 ASCAP/CBDNA Frederick Fennell Prize
- 2008 Ithaca College Walter Beeler Memorial Composition Prize
- Fifth Annual Andrew De Grado Piano Competition - Winner
- Japanese Society of Boston Toru Takemitsu Award
