= Nancy Zeltsman =

American marimba player

- Born: 1958 (age 67–68); Morristown, New Jersey, United States
- Occupations: Soloist, professor
- Instrument: Marimba
- Website: nancyzeltsman.com

Nancy Zeltsman (born 1958) is a marimba soloist who has taught at the Boston Conservatory and Berklee College of Music since 1993.

== Biography ==
Zeltsman was born in 1958 in Morristown, New Jersey.

In 1976, Zeltsman studied with Vic Firth at New England Conservatory of Music. Following her sophomore year (1978), she was a percussion fellow at Tanglewood. She then took a break, returning to NEC in 1980 to continue her studies and graduating with a Bachelor of Music (percussion performance) in 1982. With support from a National Endowment for the Arts Jazz Study Grant she then studied jazz improvisation with Dave Samuels for several years. She briefly led the Boston-based jazz octet, Counterparts.

Zeltsman performed regularly in the marimba and violin duo, Marimolin, with violinist Sharan Leventhal in the mid-1980s through the mid-1990s, and occasionally over the next decades including 40th anniversary recitals in early 2026 in Boston. She briefly performed in a marimba duo with Janis Potter in the mid-1990s; then with Jack Van Geem between 2000 and 2020.

In 1993, she started teaching marimba at The Boston Conservatory and Berklee College of Music.

Zeltsman directed Zeltsman Marimba Festival (ZMF), an annual traveling festival that brought together students and faculty for two weeks of concerts, master classes, lessons, and lectures, between 2000 and 2018. ZMF commissioned 24 intermediate compositions for the marimba ("Intermediate Masterworks for the Marimba"); sixteen were written by composers including Gunther Schuller, Lyle Mays, Robert Aldridge, Carla Bley, and Paul Simon. The other eight were chosen from entries in an international composition contest. All works were performed at ZMF 2009 in Appleton, Wisconsin.

== Recorded works ==
=== "Marimolin" (Marimba/Violin duo with Sharan Leventhal) ===
- Marimolin (1988, GM Recordings)
- Phantasmata (1995, GM Recordings)
- Combo Platter (1994, Catalyst/BMG)

=== with Jack Van Geem ===
- Pedro and Olga Learn to Dance (2004, self-issued)
- American Gifts for Marimba Duo (2020, Bridge Records)

=== solo ===
- Woodcuts (1993, GM Recordings)
- See Ya Thursday (1999, self-issued)
- Sweet Song (2005, self-issued)
- purple music (2023, self-issued)
- drinking water (2025, self-issued)

== Published works ==
- Four Mallet Marimba Playing: A Musical Approach for All Levels (2003 Hal Leonard Corporation) ISBN 0-634-03426-X.

Contributor to Percussive Notes magazine; Associate Editor of keyboard articles from 1999 through 2001; 2022 through present).
