= Robert van Sice =

American musician

Robert van Sice is an American marimba player. He currently teaches at the Yale School of Music and the Peabody Conservatory of Music, and the Curtis Institute of Music. Van Sice has his own line of marimba mallets by Vic Firth, and a line of signature marimbas by Adams Musical Instruments.

In Europe, Van Sice gave the first solo marimba recital at Amsterdam's Concertgebouw in 1989 and taught at the Rotterdam Conservatorium and Darmstädter Ferienkurse.

Among his former students are some of the four members of So Percussion.
