= Badische Philharmonie Pforzheim =

Badische Philharmonie Pforzheim is the concert and opera orchestra at the Stadttheater Pforzheim, in Baden-Württemberg, Germany.
