= Chautauqua (disambiguation) =

Chautauqua was an American social movement for arts and education in the 19th and 20th centuries.

Chautauqua, an Erie word, may also refer to:

== Businesses and organizations ==
- Chautauqua Airlines, a defunct American regional airline in Indiana
- Chautauqua Institution, an operational, New-York-based, non-profit center—which founded the movement

== Places in the United States ==
=== Illinois ===
- Chautauqua, Illinois, a private summer resort
- Chautauqua National Wildlife Refuge, on the Illinois River in Mason County

=== Kansas ===
- Chautauqua, Kansas, a city
- Chautauqua County, Kansas

=== Mississippi ===
- Chautauqua Lake (Copiah County, Mississippi)
- Lake Chautauqua (Tippah County, Mississippi)

=== New York ===
- Chautauqua County, New York
  - Chautauqua, New York, a town and lake resort
  - Chautauqua (CDP), New York, a census-designated place covering the Chautauqua Institution
  - Chautauqua Lake

=== Other states ===
- Chautauqua, Ohio, a town
- Chautauqua Park, a public space in Boulder, Colorado
- Chautauqua Park Historic District, a neighborhood in Des Moines, Iowa
- Chautauqua Lake, Pinellas County, Florida

== Sports ==
- Chautauqua (horse), a retired Australian racehorse (foaled 2010)

== See also ==
- 21st-century Chautauquas, a list of present-day Chautauquas
- Chadakoin River, an outlet of Chautauqua Lake (named with an alternate transliteration of the same Erie word)
- New Chautauqua, a music album by Pat Metheny
