= New Day =

New Day may refer to:

== Music ==
- "New Day" (50 Cent song), 2012
- "New Day" (Alicia Keys song), 2012
- "New Day" (Patti LaBelle song), 2014
- "New Day" (Tamar Kaprelian song), 2009
- "New Day" (Wyclef Jean song), 1999
- "New Day", also known as "You Are the New Day", a 1978 song by John David
- "New Day", a song by Hollywood Undead on their 2013 album Notes From The Underground
- "New Day", a song by Jay-Z and Kanye West from their 2011 collaborative album Watch the Throne
- "New Day", a song by Miz from her September 2004 album Say It's Forever
- "New Day", a song by Joe Satriani from his 1986 album Not of This Earth
- "New Day", a song by Take That from their album Wonderland

== Other uses ==
- The New Day (professional wrestling), a stable in professional wrestling formed in 2014
- The New Day (newspaper), a British newspaper published between 29 February and 6 May 2016
- New Day (novel), a 1948 novel by Jamaican writer V. S. Reid
- "New Day" (The White Lotus), a 2021 TV episode
- New Day (TV program), an American morning television show
- New Day (2016 TV program), the morning newscast of CNN Philippines

== See also ==
- Newday
- NewDay (company)
- A New Day (disambiguation)
- New Day Dawning (disambiguation)
