= A New Day =

A New Day can refer to:

== Music ==
- A New Day..., Céline Dion's 2003-07 Las Vegas show
  - A New Day... Live in Las Vegas, Céline Dion's 2004 album with the show
  - Live in Las Vegas: A New Day..., Dion's 2007 DVD with the show
- A New Day (Luciano album), a 2001 album
- A New Day (Four Letter Lie album), a 2009 album
- WWE The Music: A New Day, Vol. 10, a 2010 album put out by World Wrestling Entertainment
- "A New Day" (song), a 1984 song by Killing Joke
- A New Day (composition), a 2021 cello concerto by Joan Tower
- A New Day, a 2006 album by Sinamore
- "A New Day", a song by The Olivia Tremor Control from the 1999 album Black Foliage: Animation Music Volume One
- "A New Day", a 2007 song by Midnight Youth
- "A New Day", the main theme of the 2005 video game Sonic Rush

== Other ==
- "A New Day" (The Wire), an episode of the television series The Wire
- "A New Day" (The Walking Dead), an episode of Telltale Games' episodic video game
- A New Day, a private-label brand by Target

== See also ==
- A Nu Day, a 2000 album by Tamia
- New Day (disambiguation)
