= Eugene List =

American concert pianist and teacher (1918–1985)

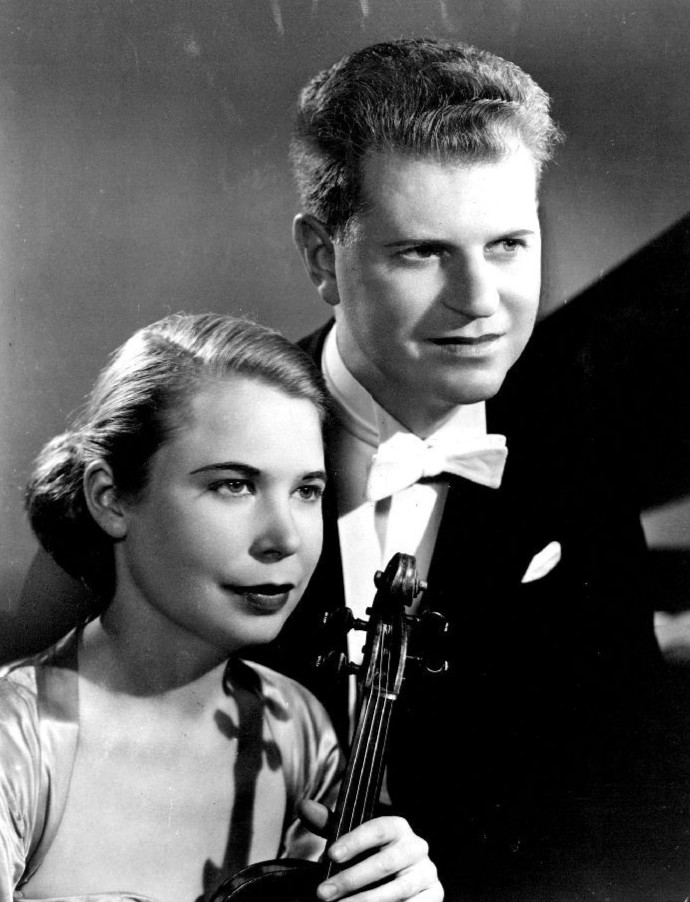
Eugene List (right) and Carroll Glenn in 1953

Eugene List (July 6, 1918 – March 1, 1985) was an American concert pianist and teacher.

== Early life ==
Eugene List was born in Philadelphia, Pennsylvania. He spent his formative years in Los Angeles, where his father Louis List (originally Lisnitzer) was a language teacher in the Los Angeles Unified School District and his mother, Rose, a pharmacist. Louis Lisnitzer had immigrated to America from Odessa, Ukraine and settled in Philadelphia, where he met and married Rose, whose family had also come from the same region. In 1937, Louis decided officially to change his name and that of his family to "List". The family soon relocated to California.

Showing early musical talent, young Eugene studied with Julius V. Seyler who soon proclaimed him a prodigy. His striking musical gifts were obvious. In 1929, at the age of 12, he performed with the Los Angeles Philharmonic under Artur Rodziński, playing Beethoven's 3rd Piano Concerto. Rodziński recommended that he go to Philadelphia to study with the renowned teacher Olga Samaroff. In 1932 she accepted young List with great enthusiasm. Too young for the Juilliard School, List first studied at the Philadelphia Conservatory under Samaroff's tutelage, transferring a few years later to Juilliard in New York.

During his second year with Madam Samaroff at Philadelphia (1934), List entered and won Philadelphia's annual piano competition, giving him the opportunity to perform with Philadelphia's celebrated orchestra. Although he had planned to perform the Schumann Piano Concerto in A minor, List was given the most stunning challenge of his career. Six weeks before the scheduled concert, Leopold Stokowski asked him to play the premiere of Piano Concerto No. 1 by Dmitri Shostakovich that he had just received from the Soviet Union. List accepted the challenge and learned the new concerto within the six-week time frame.

== Concert career ==
At the age of sixteen, Eugene List's official concert career began in December 1934 at Philadelphia's Academy of Music. Although under great stress, he delivered a dazzling performance and received rave reviews. He was declared the wunderkind and a mature artist almost immediately. List's performance as the young American who met Stokowski's challenge established him as a star, a status that would stay with him the rest of his fifty-year career. As the only pianist in America who knew Shostakovich's Piano Concerto No. 1, he received many more invitations to appear with major orchestras in the US, including the New York Philharmonic under conductor Otto Klemperer. His celebrity status spanned four continents, including Europe, South America and Asia. In the US, he performed with most all the nation's major orchestras, conductors and leading chamber ensembles. List's personality was known to be personable and unpretentious, uncommon qualities in the performing concert world. Everyone liked him. Conductors, composers, colleagues, students and even presidents valued his modest demeanour, his intellect, and his quick wit.

=== World War II ===
In December 1941, after the attack on Pearl Harbor, List enlisted in the Army without waiting for his formal call-up, asking only that he be allowed to finish the season, since he was committed to several concert dates. In March 1942, the Army assigned List, aged 26, to the New York Port of Embarkation, Brooklyn, where he was given an office job as a typist. In 1943, he married the well-known violinist, Carroll Glenn, in New York, whom he had met at Juilliard. Like her husband, Glenn was a prodigy. She had already won the prestigious Naumburg Competition, which gave her a New York debut and helped to launch her illustrious career. List was soon assigned to the Special Services, a post he had wanted since his enlistment. He performed concerts in the New York area, where all his fees went to the Army Emergency Relief. In 1945, he was sent overseas along with other enlisted entertainers. He was sent to the Paris suburb of Chatou, where he joined a collection of GI talent, including Mickey Rooney, violinist Stuart Canin, modern dancer José Limón, Bobby Breen and Josh Logan. Later, both Canin and List were ordered to start an orchestra. This eventually became the famous Seventh Army Symphony Orchestra. In June 1945, Canin and List were ordered to Potsdam, Germany where they were told to play for the President and his staff at the Potsdam Conference. Soon they learned the occasion was to play for President Harry S. Truman, Joseph Stalin and Winston Churchill, including their large entourage at the Big Three conference. Both musicians performed for the President and the conference members for the next few weeks, with President Truman even turning the pages for List when he was asked to play the Chopin Waltz in A-flat, Op. 42, a work he did not have memorized. Both musicians were astounded at the headlines in the papers and the star-studded celebrity status they had acquired. List soon became known as the "Pianist of the Presidents" or "The Potsdam Pianist." List would perform many more times at the White House, the last in 1980 for President and Mrs. Carter.

=== Post-war career ===
List's post-war concert career flourished, even gaining him a role in a movie, The Bachelor's Daughter. In 1964, he and his wife Carroll Glenn joined the faculty at Eastman School of Music in Rochester, New York. Both husband and wife would teach in Rochester until 1975 before they returned to New York, where Glenn taught violin at Queens College and the Manhattan School of Music. List joined the faculty at NYU as a part-time teacher, and for two years—1983–85—traveled by plane twice a month to teach at Carnegie Mellon in Pittsburgh. Like his former teacher Olga Samaroff, List guided his students to form their own sound and interpretation as long as it was valid to the score and intent of the composer. He stimulated their imagination and urged them to explore the vast piano repertoire. In addition to his advocacy for playing and recording American music, List also recorded the Carlos Chávez Concerto with the composer conducting. In 1975, he recorded Shostakovich's two concertos in Russia, with the composer's son, Maxim, conducting. List's great interest in Louis Moreau Gottschalk's music led to his recreation of the composer's Monster Concerts, where he featured many pianos and pianists playing together on stage. List recreated the Monster Concerts at Eastman in 1970. They were televised on The Ed Sullivan Show with 10 pianos, nine student pianists and List. He continued the Monster Concert agenda through the 1970s and into the early 1980s, including a performance at UCLA in collaboration with Henri Temianka and some 36 pianists, and a performance at Brooklyn College in 1980 in collaboration with students of Agustin Anievas. He served on the jury of the Paloma O'Shea Santander International Piano Competition in 1980.

== Death ==
In April 1983, Carroll Glenn's earlier bout with cancer suddenly returned. Several days later, she slipped into a coma. At that same time, List was scheduled to perform the Vincent Persichetti Concerto in Carnegie Hall. The next morning, after the Carnegie Hall concert, Carroll Glenn died. Only two years later, on March 1, 1985, while at home planning his own 50th anniversary concert in Carnegie Hall, List accidentally fell on the stairway of his New York brownstone and was killed. An autopsy revealed he died instantly of a broken neck. During their forty-two year marriage, Eugene List and Carroll Glenn raised two daughters, Rachel and Allison, while actively pursuing their respective concert and teaching careers.
