= Erie language =

Extinct Iroquoian language

Erie
- Native to: United States
- Region: south of Lake Erie
- Ethnicity: Erie people
- Extinct: 17th century
- Language family: Iroquoian ?: Northern; Erie

Language codes
- ISO 639-3: None (mis)
- Glottolog: erie1238
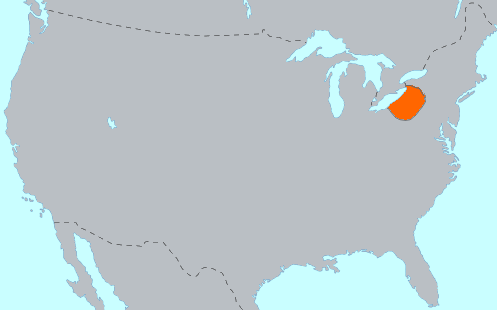
- Nation du Chat region

Erie is an extinct language formerly spoken around Lake Erie by the Erie people, believed to have been Iroquoian, similar to Wyandot. It was poorly documented, and linguists are not certain that this conclusion is correct.

The names Erie and Eriez are shortened forms of Erielhonan (Known to the Huron as /eɹiʔxehˈɹoːnõʔ/, most likely meaning, 'nation at the cherry trees'). The "Erie" part of the name means "long tail", referring to local panthers. The Erie were called the "Cat people" (Nation du Chat in French; Hodge 1910, (Note: Erie (Huron: yěñresh, 'it is long-tailed', referring to the eastern puma or panther; Tuscarora, kěn'räks, 'lion', a modern use, Gallicised into Eri and Ri, whence the locatives Eri'e, and Riqué, 'at the place of the panther', are derived. Compare the forms Erieehronon, Eriechronon, and Riquéronon of the Jesuit Relations, signifying 'people of the panther'. It is probable that in Iroquois, the puma and the wild-cat were originally referred to by the same generic name, and that the defining term has survived as the name of the puma or panther). It was a populous, sedentary Iroquoian-speaking tribe. In the 17th century, the Erie occupied territory extending south from Lake Erie probably to the Ohio River, east to the lands of the Conestoga along the east watershed of Allegheny River. Their language was thought to resemble that of the Hurons (Wyandot), known as an Iroquoian people. Smithsonian Institution Bureau of Ethnology Bulletin #30.) Swanton (Note: "Erie". Meaning in Iroquois, "long tail," and referring to the panther, from which circumstance they are often referred to as the Cat Nation. The Erie belonged to the Iroquoian language family. Also called: GA-quA'-ga-o-no, by Lewis Henry Morganal (1851))).

At least one term survives from the Erie language: Chautauqua, a place name of uncertain definition/translation.

== Geographical distribution ==
Erie territory apparently ranged from at least Presque Isle Bay in the west to the Genesee River toward the east, and from Buffalo Creek into northern Pennsylvania.

== Vocabulary ==
- Erie (Long Tail)
- Ronnongwetonwanca (Good Luck)
- Kahqua/Kahkwa (A name for the Haudenosaunee)
- Gùkulëáwo (Wolf)
- Chautauqua (Unknown, believed to be an Erie loanword)
- Gandeaktena (Personal surname for an Erie woman who was named Kateri Catherine Gandeaktena)
- Rigué/Riqué (Recorded name of one village of the Erie's, possibly served as their 'capital')
- Gentaienton (Another recorded name of an Erie village)
