= Chautauqua Auditorium (Boulder, Colorado) =

- U.S. National Register of Historic Places
- Colorado State Register of Historic Properties
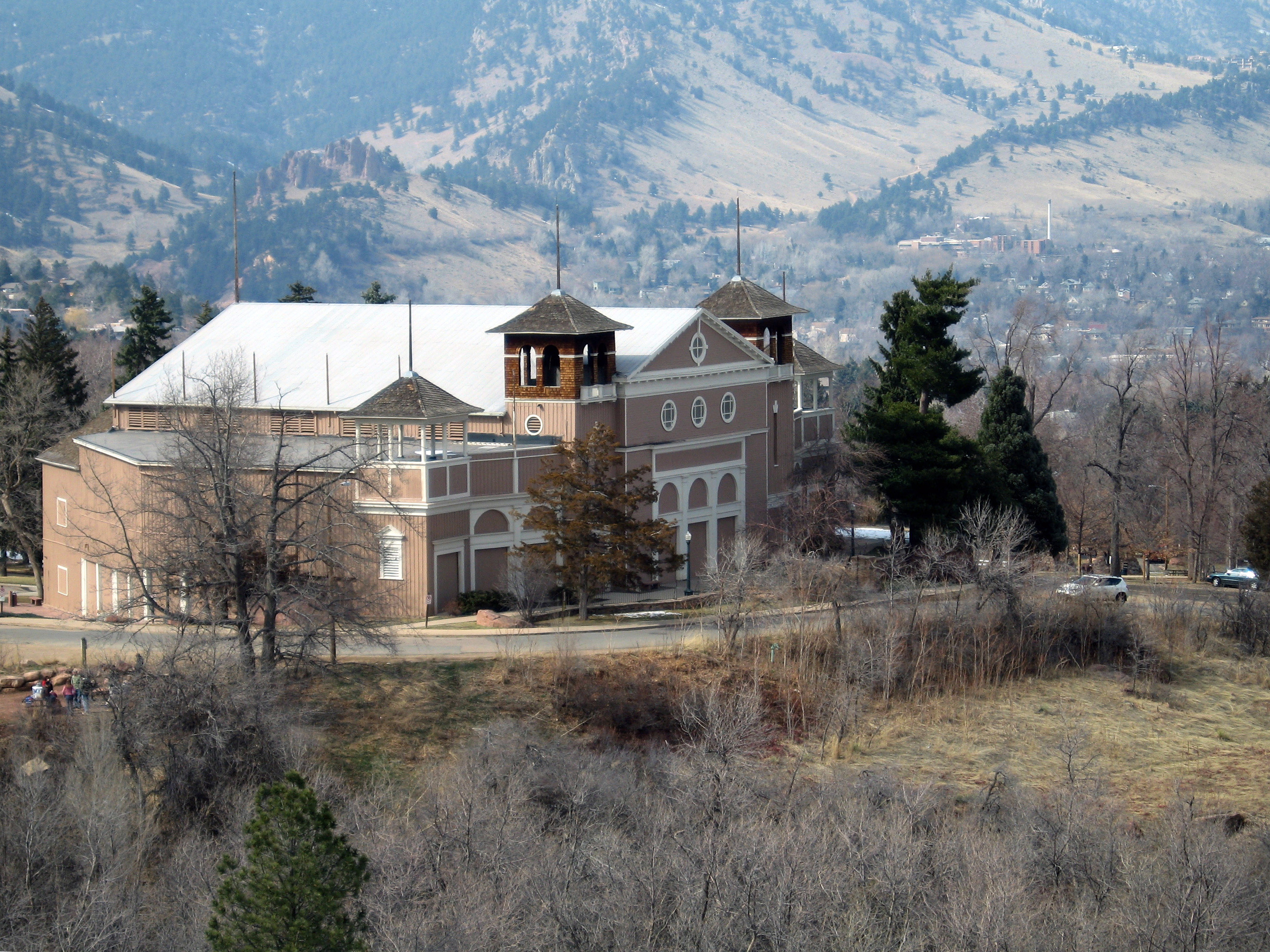
- The Chautauqua Auditorium
- Location: Boulder, Colorado
- Coordinates: 39°59′51.42″N 105°16′46.64″W
- Built: 1898
- Architects: F.E. Kidder and E.R. Rice
- NRHP reference No.: 74000562
- CSRHP No.: 5BL.362
- Added to NRHP: January 21, 1974

The Chautauqua Auditorium is a wooden building constructed for the first season of the Colorado Chautauqua in 1898, and through the years has been a venue for many lectures, musical performances, and motion pictures both primitive and modern.

Located at the Colorado Chautauqua in Boulder, Colorado, it was placed on the National Register of Historic Places in 1978. It then stood "almost as it was built and as it was dedicated on July 4, 1898."

== History ==
=== Construction and renovation ===
On May 12, 1898, construction of the Chautauqua Auditorium commenced; it was completed in time for the opening of the first Texas-Colorado Chautauqua season on July 4, 1898. The wooden building had dirt floors, covered with sawdust, and simple pine benches.

The center section of the dirt and sawdust floor was replaced with a concrete floor in 1918, and at the same time some of the original pine benches were replaced with opera chairs.

In the 1970s, about the time the building was placed on the National Register of Historic Places, it was in a dilapidated condition. A combination of two factors—the NRHP designation and the decision of the Colorado Music Festival to call the Chautauqua Auditorium its home—provided the impetus for a general renovation of the structure. Broken seats were replaced, the roof was repaired, and loose boards were reattached or replaced. The overall design of the building, however, remained unchanged. The acoustics of this wooden building remain as they have been.

As of 2024, it is still possible to see daylight through the cracks in the walls of the Auditorium. However, it is no longer possible to see the Moon and stars through cracks in the roof.

=== Notable early speeches and lectures ===
- Henry Watterson of Kentucky spoke on opening day, July 4, 1898.
- William Jennings Bryan first appeared at the Auditorium on July 12, 1899. He would return, with evangelist Samuel Porter Jones, for Jones/Bryan Day in 1905.
- Republican and Democratic orators were invited to give campaign speeches for their respective presidential candidates, William McKinley and William Jennings Bryan, in 1900. Jonathan P. Dolliver spoke on August 20, 1900 and Champ Clark the following week.
- Senators Robert M. La Follette and Benjamin Tillman appeared in 1907.
- The famed evangelist Billy Sunday spoke to large crowds at the Auditorium in 1909, 1924, 1925, and 1931.

=== Notable early musical performances ===
- The Kansas City Orchestra gave a number of evening concerts in the first year, 1898.
- Louis Richar's Band, from Chicago, played a number of concerts each year from 1903 to 1906.
- John Philip Sousa and his band appeared in the fall of 1904, after the Chautauqua season was over for that year.
- The 1910 program featured "costumed recitals from grand opera" presented by the Chicago Operatic Company on July 4.
- The Williams Jubilee Singers, called "the best troupe of colored singers in the world", gave very well received performances at the Auditorium every year from 1911 to 1917, then returned in 1922, 1924, 1926, and 1931.
- Madame Marie Rappold of the Metropolitan Opera in New York City drew the largest crowd of the 1917 season.
- Miss Frances Ingram, operatic contralto, was very well received in 1917 and 1920.
- Ernest Davis, tenor of the Boston Grand Opera Company, performed in 1920.
- Alberto Salvi, described as "the world's greatest harpist", performed every year from 1926 through 1932 except 1929.

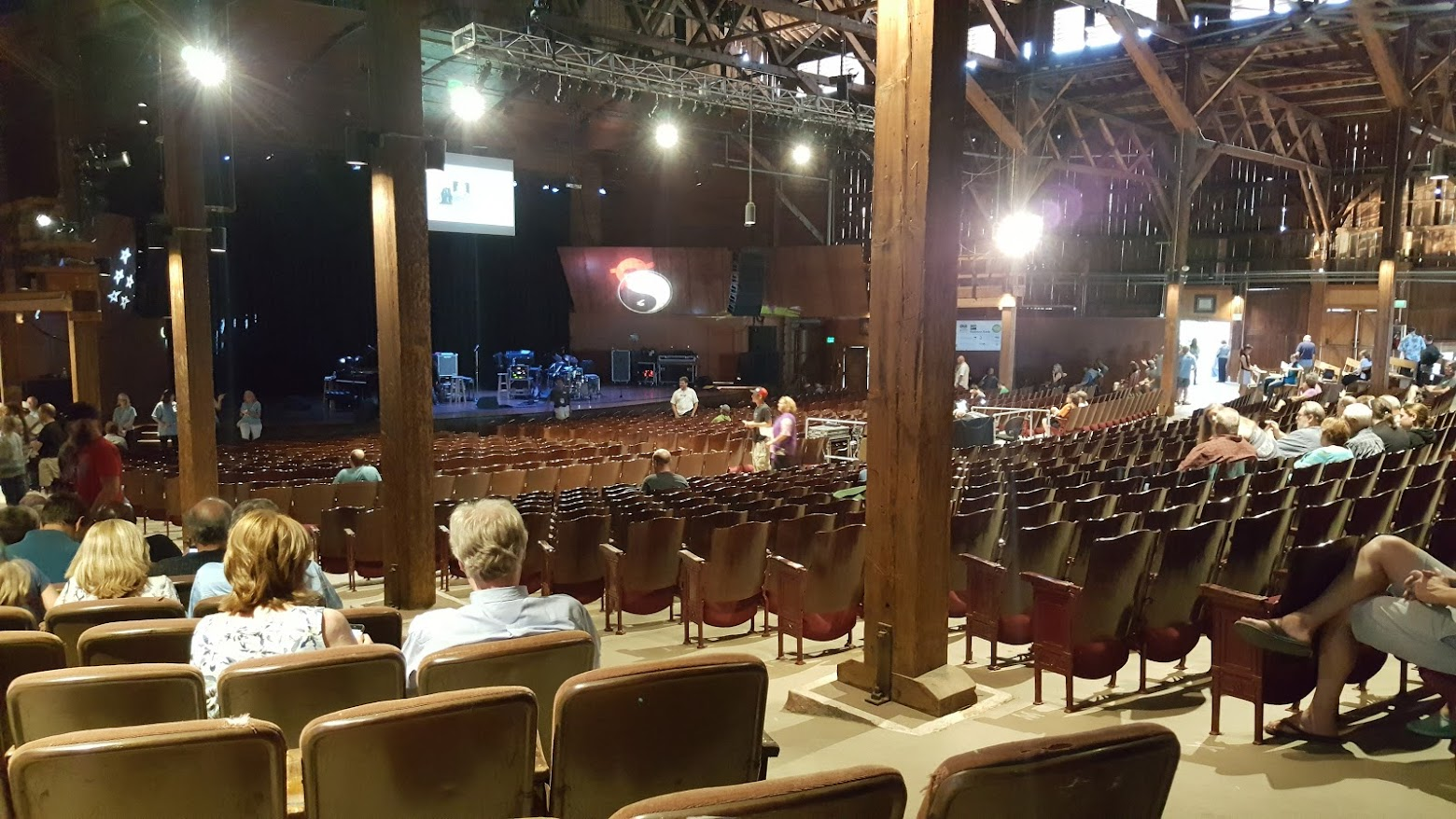
Chautauqua Auditorium Interior

=== Motion pictures ===
Although the Auditorium was mostly intended for lectures, sermons, dramatic readings, live musical performances, and variety acts similar to vaudeville, it was also a venue for motion pictures right from the beginning. In 1898, the film industry was in its experimental infancy. The evening Chautauqua program for July 21, 1898, was "Edison's Genuine Projectoscope, Colorscopic Diorama and Wargraph, with Music, reproducing scenes of the war with Spain." The exhibitor traveled with his own projection equipment, a practice that would persist at the Chautauqua Auditorium until 1918.

From the beginning, two or three motion pictures were presented at the Chautauqua Auditorium each year. The 1913 Chautauqua season was notable for the first use in Boulder of the Edison Kinetophone, an early attempt at a motion picture with synchronized sound.

In 1918, the Chautauqua Auditorium acquired its own motion picture projection equipment for silent film. The film industry had matured to the point that the investment in standardized projection equipment was deemed justified. The year 1918 also saw an abrupt increase in the number of movies shown at the Auditorium. Since the Chautauqua lacked the financial resources to compete for first run films with the commercial movie theaters, second-run movies suitable for family viewing were selected.

Talkies began in 1926, and all-talking pictures in 1929. In this regard the Colorado Chautauqua was a year or two behind the times because of its practice of scheduling second-run movies. The Auditorium upgraded its projection equipment to accommodate the new standard of motion pictures with sound. The number of movies shown at the Chautauqua Auditorium each summer was increasing.

Projection equipment at the Chautauqua Auditorium was once again updated in 1937, as Technicolor movies began to be shown. In 1948 a new movie screen was installed, twice the size of the previous screen. The new screen measured 16.5 feet by 22 feet.

By the early 1970s, projection and sound equipment at the Chautauqua Auditorium was seriously out of date. The equipment was upgraded in 1979, providing an improved viewing experience, but with the advent of home VCRs the second-run family films were discontinued in 1995.

In 2006, the only remaining motion pictures at the Colorado Chautauqua are the silent film series that started in 1986.

== Acoustical characteristics ==
As early as the Chautauqua Auditorium's first season in 1898, the acoustics of the all-wood building were being compared favorably to other venues such as the Mormon Tabernacle in Salt Lake City. Over the years, a variety of performers found the acoustics to their liking. In 1977, Giora Bernstein selected the Chautauqua Auditorium as his preferred venue for the Colorado Music Festival, even though it was in a poor state of repair, because he was enthusiastic about the reverberation offered by the wood structure.

Michelle Shocked is quoted as having described the wooden interior of the building by saying, "Now I know what my pick feels like when it falls in my guitar."
