= Vincent Dethier =

American physiologist and entomologist

Vincent Gaston Dethier
- Born: February 20, 1915; Boston, Massachusetts
- Died: September 8, 1993 (aged 78); Northampton, Massachusetts
- Education: BA, MA, PhD Harvard University
- Known for: Research in entomology and physiology

Vincent Gaston Dethier (February 20, 1915 – September 8, 1993) was an American physiologist and entomologist. Considered a leading expert in his field, he was a pioneer in the study of insect-plant interactions and wrote more than 170 academic papers and 15 science books. From 1975 until his death, he was the Gilbert L. Woodside Professor of Zoology at the University of Massachusetts Amherst where he was the founding director of its Neuroscience and Behavior Program and chaired the Chancellor's Commission on Civility. Dethier also wrote natural history books for non-specialists, as well as short stories, essays, and children's books.

== Biography ==
Vincent Dethier was born on February 20, 1915, in Boston, Massachusetts, one of the four children of Jean Vincent and Marguerite (Lally) Dethier. Before her marriage, his mother, who was of Irish extraction, was a school teacher in Boston. His Belgian-born father was a graduate of the Royal Conservatory of Liège who emigrated to the United States in the early 1900s. He was organist of the Church of the Immaculate Conception in Boston and later became Director of Music for the Norwood, Massachusetts, public school system, and the organist and choirmaster of St. Catherine's Church in Norwood. Vincent Dethier's uncles were noted musicians — Edouard Dethier was a violinist and Gaston Dethier was an organist and composer. Both taught at the Juilliard School for many years. Although Vincent Dethier was the first of his father's family to become a scientist, he retained a lifelong interest in Baroque music and played in a recorder quartet during his years at the University of Massachusetts.

In his 1989 autobiographical essay "Curiosity, Milieu and Era", Dethier attributed his interest in insects, which would become a central aspect of his research career, to a childhood encounter with a butterfly in a neighborhood park known as "the oval":

I had wandered up to the oval late one hot, humid, summer day. The long, slanting rays of the sun illuminated my white shirt. Suddenly, something rocketed across the street, made a few zigzags, and landed on my shirt, just above the pocket. I stood stock-still and slowly lowered my head to see what it was. There with its wings slowly expanding clung a brown butterfly with a red band extending down each wing. This red admiral was the first live butterfly I had ever seen at close range, and I was fascinated.

Dethier received his undergraduate degree from Harvard University and went on to obtain his PhD there in 1939. His research in the 1930s was on the feeding habits of swallowtail butterfly caterpillars. He became the first to prove that food is selected by caterpillars not for a plant's nutritional value but for its taste and smell. His first post-doctoral position was as a biology instructor at John Carroll University in Cleveland, Ohio, where he taught from 1939 to 1941. With the outbreak of World War II, he joined the Army Air Corps, serving part of his time in Africa and Middle East. He wrote his first book, Chemical Insect Attractants and Repellents, in the bomb bay of a B-25 on what he called a "liberated" Italian typewriter. He then worked in the Army Chemical Corps as a research physiologist until 1946. Towards the end of his time in the Army he worked with Leigh Edward Chadwick at the Edgewood Arsenal in Maryland (now the Aberdeen Proving Ground) in a long series of experiments analyzing the effects of chemicals on the chemosensors of flies.

After the war ended, Dethier taught briefly at Ohio State University before taking a teaching post at Johns Hopkins University, where he taught from 1947 to 1958. He was a professor of zoology and psychology at the University of Pennsylvania from 1958 to 1967 and then went to Princeton University, where for the next nine years he held the Class of 1877 Chair as Professor of Biology. In 1975, he returned to his native Massachusetts for his last appointment, the Gilbert L. Woodside Professor of Zoology at the University of Massachusetts Amherst. There he became the founding director of the Neuroscience and Behavior Program and chaired the Chancellor's Commission on Civility, publishing A University in Search of Civility in 1984.

Vincent Dethier was an active scientist and teacher until his death at the age of 78. On September 8, 1993, he had an apparent heart attack while teaching at the University of Massachusetts. He died later that day at the Cooley Dickinson Hospital in Northampton, Massachusetts, survived by his wife Lois (Crow) Dethier and their two sons, Jehan Vincent Dethier and Paul Georges Dethier.

After his death the University of Massachusetts established the Vincent G. Dethier Award for "the faculty member who best exemplifies the ideals to which Dethier aspired."

== Honors ==
Among the honors accorded to Vincent Dethier were election to the American Academy of Arts and Sciences (1960), United States National Academy of Sciences (1965), and the American Philosophical Society (1980). He was also a Fellow of the Royal Entomological Society and the recipient of the Entomological Society of America's 1967 Founders' Memorial Award. In 1993 he received the John Burroughs Medal for distinguished nature writing.

== Academic publications ==
Vincent Dethier wrote more than 170 scholarly papers and authored or co-authored several academic books. These include:

Books

- Vincent Dethier (1947) Chemical Insect Attractants and Repellents, Blakiston Press (8 editions published between 1947 and 1972)
- Vincent Dethier (1963) The physiology of insect senses, Methuen
- Vincent Dethier and Eliot Stellar (1961) Animal behavior: its evolutionary and neurological basis, Prentice-Hall (12 editions published between 1961 and 1970)
- Claude Alvin Villee and Vincent Dethier (1971) Biological principles and processes, Saunders
- Vincent Dethier (1976) Man's plague?: Insects and agriculture, Darwin Press

Papers

- Vincent Dethier (1937) "Gustation and olfaction in lepidopterous larvae", Biology Bulletin, 72:7-23
- Vincent Dethier and L. E. Chadwick (1947) "Rejection thresholds of the blowfly for a series of aliphatic alcohols", Journal of General Physiology, 30:247-253
- Vincent Dethier (1951) "The limiting mechanism in tarsal chemoreception", Journal of General Physiology, 35:55-65.
- Vincent Dethier (1954) "Evolution of feeding preferences in phytophagous insects", Evolution, 8:33-54
- Vincent Dethier (1957) "Communication by insects: physiology of dancing", Science, 125:331-336.
- Vincent Dethier and R. H. MacArthur (1964) "A field's capacity to support a butterfly population", Nature 201:729
- Vincent Dethier (1964) "Microscopic Brains" Science, 143:1138-1145
- Vincent Dethier (1973) "Electrophysiological studies of gustation in lepidopterous larvae II: Taste spectra in relation to food-plant discrimination", Journal of General Physiology, 82:103-134
- Vincent Dethier (1980) "Food-aversion learning in two polyphagous caterpillars, Diacrisia virginica and Estigmene congrua", Physiological Entomology 5:321-325
- Vincent Dethier (1993) "Food-finding by polyphagous arctiid caterpillars lacking antennal and maxillary chemoreceptors", Canadian Entomologist 125(1):85-92.

== Other publications ==
In addition to his academic publications, Vincent Dethier wrote books on natural history for non-specialists as well as essays, short-stories and children's books, several of which he also illustrated. These include:

Natural history

- To Know a Fly (1962) McGraw-Hill ISBN 0-07-016574-2
- The World of the Tent Makers (1980) University of Massachusetts Press ISBN 0-87023-300-9
- The Ecology of a Summer House (1984) University of Massachusetts Press ISBN 0-87023-422-6
- Crickets and Katydids, Concerts and Solos (1992) Harvard University Press ISBN 0-674-17577-8 (winner of the John Burroughs Medal)

Children's books

- Fairweather Duck (1970) Walker
- Newberry, The Life and Times of a Maine Clam (1981) Down East Books. ISBN 0-89272-085-9

Humor

- Buy Me a Volcano (1972) Vantage Press
- The Ant Heap (1979) Darwin Press ISBN 0-87850-034-0

Philosophical essays

- "Fly, rat and man: The continuing quest for an understanding of behavior" (1981) in Proceedings of the American Philosophical Society, Vol. 125
- Ten Masses: Impressions (1988) Alba House ISBN 0-8189-0537-9
- "Sniff, flick, and pulse: An appreciation of interruption" (1987) in Proceedings of the American Philosophical Society, Vol. 131

Short stories

- "Haboob" (1960) The Kenyon Review, Vol. 22, No. 2 (anthologized in Gallery of Modern Fiction: Stories From the Kenyon Review, Salem Press, 1966)
- "The Moth and the Primrose" (1980) The Massachusetts Review, Vol. 21, No. 2 (anthologized in The Best American Short Stories of 1981, Penguin Books, 1982)

== Sources ==
- Bowman, John S. (ed), "Dethier, Vincent G. (Gaston)", The Cambridge Dictionary of American Biography, Cambridge University Press 1995. ISBN 0-521-40258-1
- Calisher, Hortense (ed.) The Best American Short Stories 1981, Penguin Books, 1982. ISBN 0-14-006135-5
- Capinera, John L. (ed), "Dethier, Vincent Gaston", Encyclopedia of Entomology Vol. 3, Springer, 2008, pp. 1186–1187. ISBN 1-4020-6242-7
- Dethier, Vincent, "Curiosity, Milieu and Era" in Donald A. Dewsbury (ed.), Studying Animal Behavior: Autobiographies of the Founders, University of Chicago Press, 1989. ISBN 0-226-14410-0
- Gelperin, Alan, Hildebrand, John, G. and Eisner, Thomas, "Vincent Gaston Dethier 1915–1993", National Academy of Sciences, 2006 (also published in Biographical Memoirs: Volume 89, National Academies Press, 2008. ISBN 0-309-11372-5)
- Hanson, Frank, Schoonhoven, Louis and Prokopy, Ronald, "In memoriam: Vincent G. Dethier", Journal of Insect Behavior, Volume 8, Number 1, January 1995, pp. 139–148. ISSN 0892-7553
- New York Times, "Vincent Dethier, 78, Professor and Expert On Insects, Is Dead", September 11, 1993, p. 111
- Entomological Society of America, Winners of the Founders' Memorial Award
- University of Massachusetts Amherst, Neuroscience and Behavior Program, Vincent G. Dethier Award, 2009
