= Mark Grey =

American classical composer

Mark Grey is an American classical music composer, sound designer and sound engineer.

== Education and early career ==
Mark Grey attended San Jose State University in California, where he studied electroacoustic music and composition with Pablo Furman and Allen Strange. Grey received a Bachelor and Master of Arts in composition. Several years of teaching at the California State Summer School for the Arts allowed Grey to meet and establish ties with several contemporary composers and performers, including John Adams. Through Adams, Grey was introduced to Kronos Quartet in 1993. Kronos later recruited Grey to be one of their live performance sound designers.

== Composer ==
Grey made his Carnegie Hall debut as a composer with Kronos Quartet in 2003. His solo, ensemble and orchestra music has been performed in many venues including the Sydney Opera House Concert Hall, Théâtre de la Ville in Paris, Barbican Centre in London, Het Muziektheater in Amsterdam, Carnegie Hall's Zankel Hall, Philharmonie Hall in Warsaw, UNESCO Palacio de Bellas Artes in Mexico City, Symphony Hall in Phoenix, Royce Hall in Los Angeles, as well as at the Ravinia, Cabrillo, OtherMinds, Perth International, and Spoleto festivals.

Grey was commissioned by The National Opera of Belgium La Monnaie de Munt Opera to write an evening length grand opera that premiered during the spring of 2016 in Brussels. The subject of the opera was Mary Shelley's Frankenstein – to commemorate the novel's 200 year anniversary. The libretto was written by Júlia Canosa i Serra with stage direction by Àlex Ollé (La Fura dels Baus). In 2013–14, commissions were awarded from The Atlanta Symphony Orchestra and The Los Angeles Philharmonic, among others.

During a two-month period in the spring of 2011, Grey received three world premieres in three of the world's great concert halls. The first work was for soprano Jessica Rivera and The MEME Ensemble, titled Ātash Sorushān (Fire Angels), a Carnegie Hall, Cal Performances and Meet The Composer co-commission, which premiered at Carnegie's Zankel Hall. The libretto for this work was created by poet Niloufar Talebi. The second work, titled Mugunghwa (Rose of Sharon), for violinist Jennifer Koh, Los Angeles Master Chorale, and chamber orchestra premiered at Walt Disney Concert Hall in Los Angeles. Finally, Mr. Grey was commissioned by the Atlanta Symphony Orchestra to write a fanfare for orchestra celebrating Robert Spano's Tenth Anniversary as music director and Donald Runnicles’ Tenth Anniversary as principal guest conductor.

Grey was The Phoenix Symphony's composer in residence for their 2007/08 season. He composed a 70-minute oratorio, Enemy Slayer: A Navajo Oratorio, for baritone, chorus of 130 singers, and full orchestra, which premiered in February 2008. The story of the oratorio was based on a Navajo creation mythology story. The residency was funded by Meet The Composer and ASOL's program Music Alive! The oratorio was recorded for Naxos Records and released March 2009. Enemy Slayer was also performed at the Colorado Music Festival in July 2008 and in Salt Lake City in May 2009 with the Salt Lake Choral Artists. In September 2007, a 10-minute full orchestra work was premiered during the residency period, titled The Summons.

Other recent commissions include works for The Los Angeles Philharmonic's Minimalist Jukebox Festival, Kronos Quartet, Colorado Music Festival Orchestra, Leila Josefowicz, Paul Dresher Ensemble, The California EARUnit, and Joan Jeanrenaud.

Bertoia I and II, a two-movement composition, was included as part of Kronos' evening length program Visual Music which has been performed at Theatre de la Ville (Paris), Sydney Opera House, Perth International Music Festival (Australia), Barbican Centre (London), Het Muziktheater (Amsterdam), Carnegie Hall (New York City), Royce Hall (Los Angeles), Yerba Buena Center for the Arts (San Francisco), and several others.

During her 2005/2006 season, violin prodigy Leila Josefowicz toured Grey's San Andreas Suite for unaccompanied violin as part of her recital program. Performances have been worldwide, including Barbican Centre in London, Warsaw Philharmonic Hall, Carnegie Hall in November 2005 and Ravinia Festival in the summer of 2006. As well, she recorded the recital program for Warner Classics, released April 2005. In the summer of 2006, Ms. Josefowicz premiered Grey's violin concerto titled Elevation. At the Colorado Music Festival with conductor Michael Christie, and then at the Cabrillo Music Festival with conductor Marin Alsop.

In April 2009, Molly Morkoski premiered a new solo piano work titled A Rax Dawn at Symphony Space in New York City. In August 2009, Areon Flutes premiered a flute quartet titled The Alluring Wave at the 2009 U.S. National Flute Convention.

In July 2005, Michael Christie premiered Grey's new work for orchestra titled Pursuit as part of the Colorado Music Festival.

Grey's music can be heard on Naxos (Enemy Slayer), Joan Jeanrenaud's debut album Metamorphosis on New Albion Records, NPR/Nonesuch Records/Carnegie Hall radio series Creators at Carnegie, and Warner Classics (Josefowicz, San Andreas Suite).

During his tenure at San Jose State University, Grey performed with an experimental noise music ensemble called the Gas Chamber Orchestra, a group created in response to the California ruling in October 1994 that the gas chamber is cruel and unusual punishment and therefore unconstitutional.

Grey was listed in the Los Angeles Times Faces to Watch 2006 by classical music writer Mark Swed.

== Sound designer ==
Over two decades as a sound designer, professional relationships have led Grey to work with such organizations and artists as Boosey & Hawkes Music Publishers, John Adams, Steve Reich, Philip Glass, Terry Riley, Péter Eötvös, Kronos Quartet and The Paul Dresher Ensemble. He has premiered major concert and opera works for these composers.

Grey was the first sound designer in history to design for The New York Philharmonic at Avery Fisher Hall in 2002 (Adams’ On the Transmigration of Souls), The Lyric Opera of Chicago in 2007, Walt Disney Concert Hall in 2003 and was the first to design for The Metropolitan Opera in New York City, for Adams' Doctor Atomic in October 2008. His sound design creations have been seen and heard throughout most major concert halls, theatres and opera houses worldwide.

Grey continues to work as sound designer for John Adams. He was the recording engineer on Adams' Hoodoo Zephyr, and was the sound designer for El Niño, Doctor Atomic, and On the Transmigration of Souls. His design work with Adams has been viewed as "cutting edge" for the world of traditional Classical music; the sound design for Doctor Atomic marked the first time house amplification was used in concert halls such as the Lyric Opera of Chicago or the New York Metropolitan Opera.

In 2011 Grey provided the sound design for The Chicago Lyric's production of Jerome Kern's Show Boat with co-productions at Houston Grand Opera, San Francisco Opera, and Washington National Opera in D.C.

In 2008 Grey provided the sound design for Stewart Wallace's opera The Bonesetter's Daughter when it premiered at the San Francisco Opera.

From 1990 to 1996 Grey worked as the first ever editorial intern at Keyboard Magazine, publishing technical materials and a monthly column.

== Compositions ==
=== Stage ===
Frankenstein

Opera
Premiere: Le Théâtre Royal de la Monnaie | de Munt, Brussels, Belgium
Spring 2019
Co-commissioners to be announced
Music by Mark Grey
Libretto by Júlia Canosa i Serra
Stage Direction by Àlex Ollé Gol (La Fura dels Baus)
Set Design by Alfons Flores
Costume Design by Lluc Castells
Conducted by Bassem Akiki

Othello

for electronic surround soundscapes
Full-length theatrical production
Peter Sellars, director
Featuring Philip Seymour Hoffman, John Ortiz, and Jessica Chastain.
Premiered at the Wiener Festwochen (Vienna, Austria) in June 2009 German premiere: June 2009, K15 Festival in Bochum, Germany
U.S. premiere: September 2009, Public Theater in New York City

=== Orchestra ===
Leviathan

Overture for Orchestra
Premiere: The Green Bay Symphony Orchestra
Donato Cabrera, conductor
Date: March 9, 2013

AHSHA

Fanfare for Orchestra
Commissioned by The Atlanta Symphony Orchestra
Robert Spano, music director
In celebration of Robert Spano's 10th anniversary as music director and Donald Runnicles’ 10th anniversary as principal guest conductor
Atlanta Symphony Orchestra - Donald Runnicles, conductor
January 27–29, 2011, Atlanta Symphony Hall

The Summons

for orchestra
Premiered September 2007
The Phoenix Symphony
Michael Christie, conductor

Elevation

for solo violin and orchestra
Premiered on July 9, 2006
The Colorado Music Festival Orchestra
Leila Josefowicz, violin
Michael Christie, conductor
West coast premiere on August 12, 2006
The Cabrillo Music Festival Orchestra
Leila Josefowicz, violin
Marin Alsop, conductor

Pursuit

for orchestra
Premiered on July 3, 2005
The Colorado Music Festival Orchestra
Michael Christie, conductor

=== Vocal and choral ===
Ātash Sorushān (Fire Angels)

for soprano, tenor and full orchestra
The Atlanta Symphony Orchestra
Robert Spano, conductor
Premiere: March 2014, Atlanta Symphony Hall

Enemy Slayer: A Navajo Oratorio

for baritone, full chorus and large orchestra
Premiered February 2008
The Phoenix Symphony
Scott Hendricks, baritone
Michael Christie, conductor

Harvest of Rage

Three pieces for tenor, small choir and orchestra for John Duykers, 2000

==== With orchestra ====
Ātash Sorushān (Fire Angels)

for soprano and chamber orchestra
A Carnegie Hall co-commission with Cal Performances and others
World Premiere: March 29, 2011, Carnegie Hall's Zankel Hall, New York West Coast Premiere: April 03, 2011, Cal Performances, Hertz Hall, Berkeley, CA
Music by Mark Grey
Libretto by Niloufar Talebi
Jessica Rivera, soprano
Molly Morkoski, piano and the MEME ensemble
Donato Cabrera, conductor

Mugunghwa: Rose of Sharon

for solo violin, double chorus and chamber orchestra
A Los Angeles Master Chorale commission
Premiere: March 06, 2011, Walt Disney Concert Hall, Los Angeles
Los Angeles Master Chorale
Grant Gershon, conductor
Jennifer Koh, violin

=== Solo instrumental ===
A Rax Dawn

for solo piano
World Premiere on April 20, 2009
Symphony Space, Cutting Edge Concerts, New York, NY
European Premiere in February 2010, Le Concours International de Piano d'Orléans, Orléans, France
Molly Morkoski, piano

San Andreas Suite

for solo violin
Premiered October 2004 (performances worldwide)
Leila Josefowicz, violin

HÖLLENTAL (Hell's Valley)

for violin and piano
to premiere in London 2013
by Mili Leitner, violin

Sands of Time

for four celli and live computer processing
Premiere at OtherMinds Festival and recorded by Joan Jeanrenaud, 2002

Blood Red

for cello and live computer processing
Premiere at Opus415 Festival and recorded by Joan Jeanrenaud, 2001

Left for the Dogs

for solo violin
Premiered at The New World Symphony - Inside the Music Series, Miami 2007 (with several performances in the U.S.)
Piotr Szewczyk, violin

Hammerhead

for solo piano
Premiered by Marja Mutru, 2000

=== Chamber music ===
New Work for Violin and Piano

To be recorded in Vienna, Austria, November 2010 – supporting international performance dates will follow
Christian Scholl, violin
Eduard Kutrowatz, piano

The Alluring Wave

for flute quartet
Areon Flutes
May 2009, performances and recording to follow

Sparrow's Echo

for string quartet
Premiere recording (2004) by Leila Josefowicz (violin), Airi Yoshioka (violin), Nokuthula Ngwenyama (viola), Nina Lee (cello)

Grinder

for violin, cello, percussion and electronics
Premiered by The California EarUnit, 2001 premiere recording (2004) by Leila Josefowicz, violin; Sophie Shao, cello; David Cossin, percussion

Bertoia I and Bertoia II

for string quartet, eight infra-red sensors and live computer processing
Premiered by Kronos Quartet, 2003

The Sleepless Dream

for flute, bass clarinet, percussion, piano, violin and cello
Premiered on March 27, 2006
commissioned by the California EarUnit for the Los Angeles Philharmonic's Minimalist Jukebox Festival 2006

Kemi

for violin, bass clarinet, guitar, sampler, electronic percussion and MIDI marimba
Premiered by The Paul Dresher Ensemble, 2003

Spadefoot

for string quartet and live computer processing
Premiered by Kronos Quartet, 1999

== Sound design ==
=== Opera ===
Oklahoma!

Richard Rodgers and Oscar Hammerstein II
Lyric Opera of Chicago, May 2013
more info

Show Boat

Jerome Kern and Oscar Hammerstein II
Houston Grand Opera, January 2013
more info

Nixon in China

John Adams
San Francisco Opera, June 2012
more info

Show Boat

Jerome Kern and Oscar Hammerstein II
Lyric Opera of Chicago, February 2012
more info

=== Concert ===
Nixon in China

John Adams
Concert Version
BBC Symphony Orchestra, The BBC Proms, Royal Albert Hall, London, September 2012
more info

Nixon in China

John Adams
Concert Version
BBC Symphony Orchestra, Berlin Festspiele, Berlin Philharmonie, September 2012
more info
