= Édouard Dethier =

Edouard Dethier
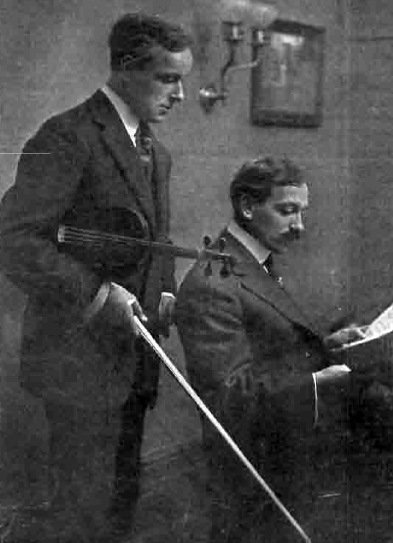
- Edouard Dethier (left) with his brother, Gaston
- Born: Édouard Charles Louis Dethier; 25 August 1885; Liège, Belgium
- Died: 19 February 1962 (aged 76); New York City
- Occupations: Violinist; Violin teacher
- Years active: 1902–1962

Edouard Charles Louis Dethier (25 August 1885 – 19 February 1962) was a Belgian classical violinist and teacher. He was a soloist with the New York Philharmonic and New York Symphony orchestras as well as extensively touring the United States and Canada as a recitalist. From 1906, he also taught violin at the Juilliard School. Amongst his many distinguished pupils there was Robert Mann. He was the brother of Gaston Dethier, a noted organist and pianist, and likewise a teacher at Juilliard for many years.

== Biography ==
Edouard Dethier was born in Liège in 1885 to Émile Jean Joseph Dethier (1849–1933), organist, composer, and teacher at the Royal Conservatory of Liège, and Marie (Donnay) Dethier. The couple had seven children, all of whom were musical, although Edouard and his older brother Gaston were the most famous. The four daughters all became pianists. The youngest son, Jean, was organist of the Church of the Immaculate Conception in Boston and later became Director of Music for the Norwood, Massachusetts public school system and the organist and choirmaster of St. Catherine's Church in Norwood. (Jean's son Vincent Dethier became a noted biologist.) Dethier was first introduced to the violin by his brother Gaston who originally trained as a violinist and was ten years older than Edouard. At the age of eight, he began his studies at the Liège conservatory, from which he graduated with the First Prize. He then entered the Brussels Conservatory where at the end of his first year (and still only sixteen) he was awarded "First Prize with great distinction" (Premier Prix avec grand distinction) in the Brussels Concours de Violon. Shortly after that he was invited to play in the palace of King Leopold II.

At seventeen Dethier already had a teaching post at the Brussels Conservatory and remained in the city for the next three years, living with his close friend and fellow violinist Paul Kochanski. During that time he was also appointed concertmaster of the orchestra of the Théâtre Royal de la Monnaie (the main opera house in Brussels) and played in Eugène Ysaÿe's symphony orchestra.

In 1905, Gaston suggested that his brother join him in the United States, where he was a solo recitalist and the organist of the Church of St. Francis Xavier in Manhattan. That same year Gaston had also been appointed the head of the organ department at the newly established Institute of Musical Art (later to become the Juilliard School). On his arrival in the United States, Edouard gave solo recitals in the United States and Canada, as well as sonata recitals with his brother on the piano. In 1907, he too joined the faculty of the Institute of Musical Art as a violin teacher. For his first eight years in the United States, Dethier toured extensively and was a soloist for both the New York Philharmonic and New York Symphony orchestras as well as the Montreal Symphony. In New York City, he performed Cécile Chaminade's Trio pour Piano, Violon et Violoncelle with the composer at the piano (1908) as well as partnering Olive Fremstad in a recital at the Brooklyn Academy of Music (1912) and Clara Butt in her first recital at Carnegie Hall (1913). Over the years, he increasingly devoted himself to teaching.

In 1911 Dethier married Avis Putnam (1884–1943), the daughter of Irving Putnam of the famous publishing house G. P. Putnam's Sons. The couple had three children – Richard Emile, who died in 1928 at the age of fourteen, a younger son, Charles, and a daughter, Margot. Dethier's second wife was the violinist Christine (Phillipson) Dethier who also taught at Juilliard. Edouard Dethier died in New York City on 19 February 1962 at the age of 76. He was survived by his widow Christine (who died in 1995) and two children from his first marriage, Charles Putnam Dethier and Margot Dethier Fogg, wife of noted railroad artist Howard L. Fogg.

== Students ==
The following violinists were students of Edouard Dethier:

- Giora Bernstein
- Julius Hegyi
- Robert Mann
- Paul Zukofsky
- Carroll Glenn
- Esther Rabiroff

== Sources ==
- Christopher, Robert, Robert and Frances Flaherty: Early Years and the Making of Nanook, McGill-Queen's Press, 2005. ISBN 0-7735-2876-8
- Crowthers, Dorothy, "Les Frères Dethier", The Baton, Vol. 1, No. 5, May 1922
- Dethier, Vincent, "Curiosity, Milieu and Era" in Donald A. Dewsbury (ed.), Studying Animal Behavior: Autobiographies of the Founders, University of Chicago Press, 1989. ISBN 0-226-14410-0
- Hall, Charles J., Chronology of Western Classical Music, Taylor & Francis, 2002. ISBN 0-415-94216-0
- Key, Pierre (ed.), "Dethier, Edouard", Pierre Key's Musical Who's Who , Pierre Key Inc., 1931, p. 145.
- Olmstead, Andrea, Juilliard: A History, University of Illinois Press, 2002. ISBN 0-252-07106-9
- Pratt, Waldo Selden (ed.), "Dethier, Edouard", Grove's Dictionary of Music and Musicians (Vol. 6: American supplement), The Macmillan Company, 1920, p. 91
