= Carroll Glenn =

American violinist (1918–1983)

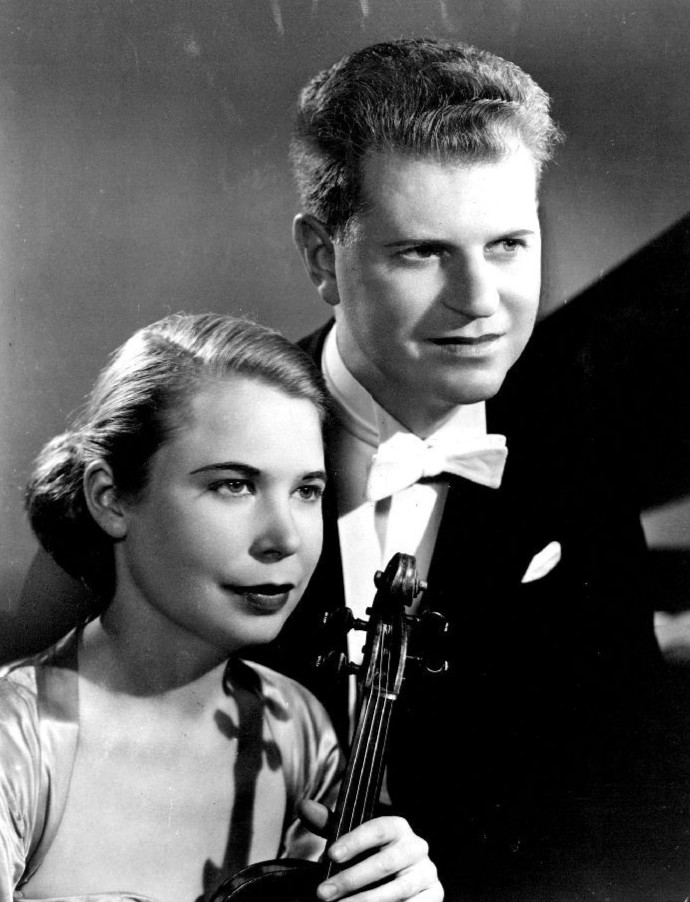
Carroll Glenn and Eugene List in 1953.

Elizabeth Carroll Glenn (October 28, 1918 – April 25, 1983) was an American violinist and music educator.

== Early years ==
Glenn was born in Richmond, Virginia in 1918. She began studying violin under her mother’s guidance when she was four and continued her studies in Columbia, South Carolina, with Felice de Horvath, who, at the time was teaching at the University of South Carolina. At age 11, Glenn moved to New York to study with Edouard Déthier at the Juilliard School through a cooperative program with the New Lincoln School, an experimental K-12 program operated by Teachers College, Columbia University. She graduated from Juilliard at age 15 with the faculty scholarship award, and subsequently continued graduate studies at Juilliard.

== Career ==
Carroll Glenn won the Naumburg Violin Competition in April 1938 and, as part of her prize, the Walter W. Naumburg Foundation sponsored her post-Juilliard New York debut recital at the Town Hall on November 7, 1938. Her performance at Town Hall resulted in her winning the Town Hall Young Artist Award on April 11, 1939 — presented annually by the Town Hall Endowment to an artist under thirty years of age who gave the most outstanding performance in the prior year. Two more awards followed: the National Federation of Music Clubs Award and the Schubert Memorial Award. In 1939, she was a soloist with the Naumburg Orchestral Concerts, in the Naumburg Bandshell, Central Park, in the summer series.

She debuted with the New York Philharmonic under Artur Rodziński on December 14, 1941, performing the Sibelius Violin Concerto, with critical success. Six days later, Glenn was soloist for the world premiere broadcast performance of Harold Morris' Violin Concerto with the National Orchestral Association and conductor Léon Barzin. During her 1942–1943 season, Glenn was featured in 21 orchestral concerts throughout North America.

She married pianist Eugene List in 1943, and they concertized together in 1946, when the U.S. State Department sponsored their first European tour. Glenn and List attracted vast audiences during the 1946 summer concerts of the Philadelphia Orchestra at the Robin Hood Dell and during 1948 and 1949 concerts of the New York Philharmonic at Lewisohn Stadium.

Glenn and List were strongly interested in offbeat, rarely performed, and contemporary music, including the double concertos of Giovanni Battista Viotti and Anis Fuleihan, and the Duo Sonata by Franz Liszt, which they rediscovered. Glenn gave the premiere of Andrew Imbrie's Violin Concerto (which she later recorded) and revived Eugène Ysaÿe's Sonata for two violins.

By 1961, Glenn had made over 90 appearances as soloist with major symphony orchestras, an all-time record for a soloist of her years.

In 1963, Glenn became Artist in Residence at the University of North Texas College of Music. From 1975 until her death, she divided her teaching between the Manhattan School of Music and Queens College. In 1974 she and List founded the Southern Vermont Music Festival in Manchester. Her last concert tour, in 1981, was to the People's Republic of China, where, in addition to performances, she gave master classes at the Peking and Shanghai conservatories.

She died in 1983 in New York, aged 64.

Glenn was admired as the foremost woman violinist of her generation. Her playing had “an ingratiating lyric quality and a communicative charm, though there was a core of strength and determination that belied her youthful appearance. Her tone was sweet and pure...; her technique was secure in a vast repertory.”

Glenn’s violin was the Dragonetti-Walton Guarneri "del Gesù", 1742. It was considered the "twin sister" of Heifetz’s famous Guarneri.

== Notable tours ==
- In the fall of 1962, Paul Freeman, conductor at the Eastman School of Music embarked on an extensive tour of Poland with Glenn. The tour, sponsored by the US State Department and the Polish Art Agency, had Freeman conduct concerts with the orchestras in Katowice, Bydgoszcz, Łódź, Poznań, Warsaw, and Kraków.

== Family ==
Eugene List and Carroll Glenn had two daughters, Ola Allison List (born 1950) and Norma Rachel List (born 1956). Allison was married to Joseph Gerard Werner, a pianist with the Rochester Philharmonic who had studied at Eastman with Eugene List. Rachel, a dance choreographer and university professor, is married to Michael Sansonia, also a musician.

== Selected discography ==
- Mendelssohn, Double Concerto in D minor (1969) — world premiere recording on YouTube

Eugene List, piano, Carroll Glenn, violin
Vienna Chamber Orchestra, Ernst Märzendorfer, conductor
Westminster WST-17166 OCLC 477414011
