= Howard L. Fogg =

American artist (1917–1996)

Margot Fogg and Howard Fogg. 1990 photo by Richard Fogg.

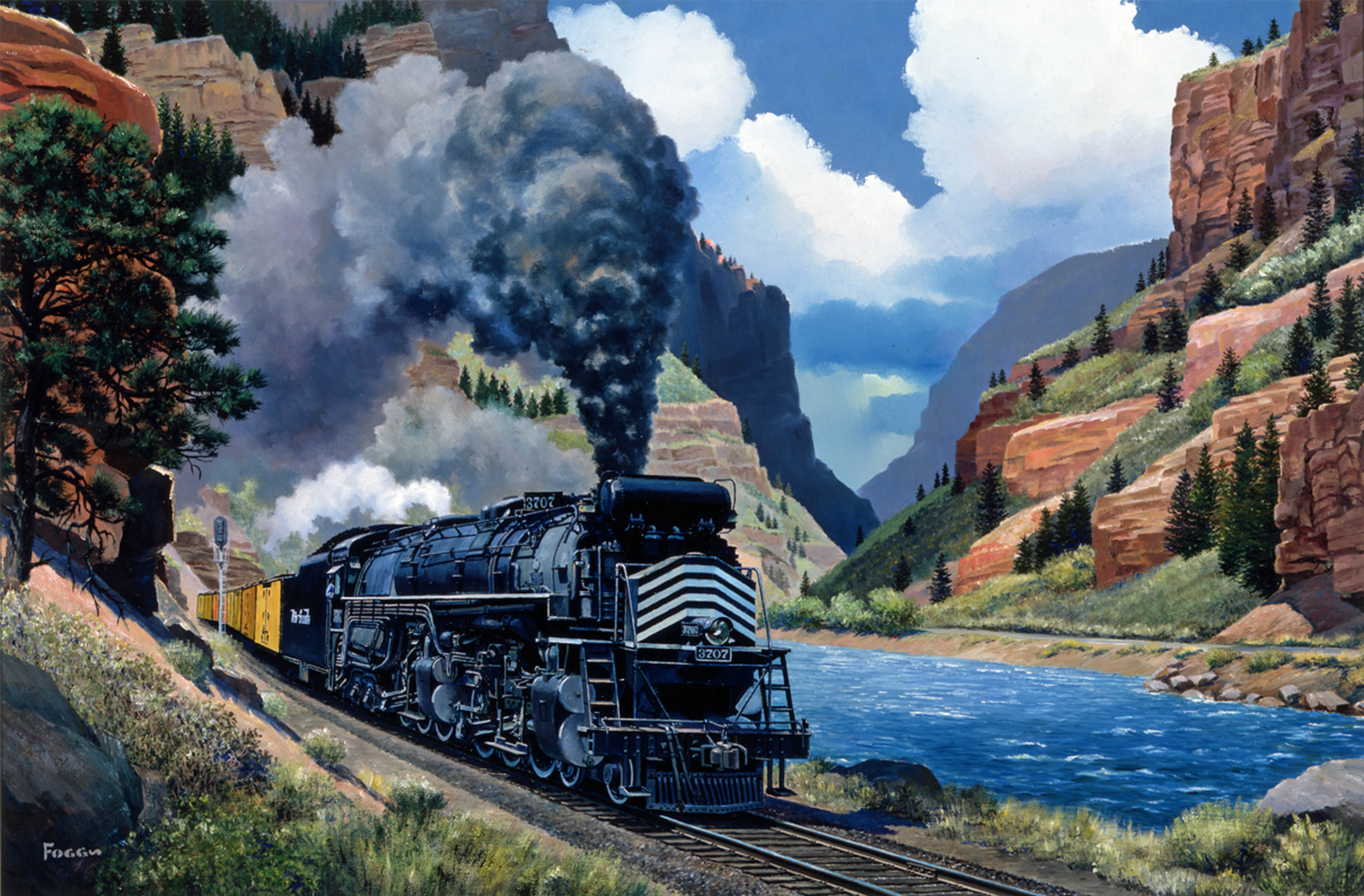
Denver and Rio Grande Western No. 3707 along the Colorado River in Glenwood Canyon, Colorado. Oil painting by Howard Fogg courtesy of Richard Fogg.

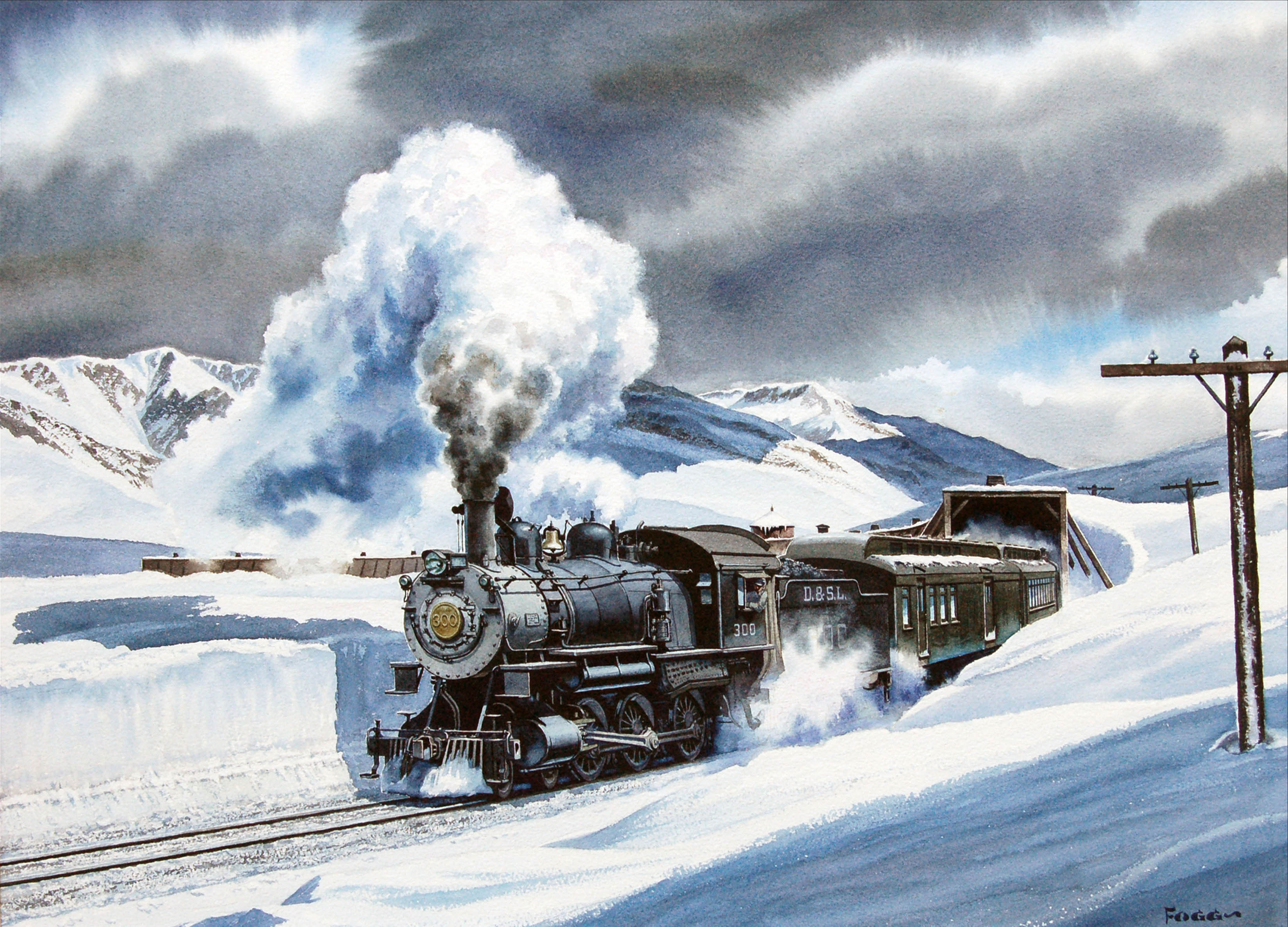
Denver & Salt Lake Railroad passenger train exiting a snow shed at the top of Rollins Pass, Colorado. Watercolor painting by Howard Fogg courtesy of Richard Fogg.

Howard Lockhart Fogg (April 7, 1917 – October 1, 1996) was an American artist specializing in railroad art.

== Early life ==
Howard Fogg was born in Brooklyn, New York, on April 7, 1917. Raised in Wilmette, Illinois, his love of railroading came from his father, a VP of the Litchfield & Madison Railway. After graduating from New Trier High School in 1934, and with honors from Dartmouth College in 1938 with a B.A. in English Literature, he enrolled in the Chicago Academy of Fine Arts, intending to pursue a career in political cartooning.

== Fighter Pilot ==
Drafted into the Army in 1941, Howard transferred to the Army Air Corps and received his commission as a 2nd Lieutenant with pilot's wings in November, 1942. On April 10, 1943, he married Margot Dethier, daughter of the Belgian classical violinist Edouard Dethier, and that October Howard sailed for England, assigned to the 359th Fighter Group, USAAF Station 133 in East Wretham. As chronicled in the book Fogg in the Cockpit, he flew 76 combat missions in P-47 Thunderbolts and P-51 Mustangs and was awarded the Air Medal with three clusters and the Distinguished Flying Cross with one cluster.

== Association with ALCO ==
After his Honorable Discharge in August, 1945, family friend and famed pollster Elmo Roper introduced Howard to Duncan Fraser, President of the American Locomotive Company (ALCO). Fraser hired Howard as company artist in March, 1946. That September, at an ALCO gala at the Waldorf Astoria Hotel in New York, Howard met Lucius Beebe, a journalist with the New York Herald-Tribune. Beebe planned to write a series of railroad books, and in 1947 his book, Mixed Train Daily, was the first of many to use a Fogg painting on the cover. Over the next 40 years, many other distinguished railroad authors also commissioned art from him.

Another attendee, John W. Barriger III, would prove to be even more influential in the development of Howard's career. Barriger, then President of the Monon Railroad, was renowned for his ability to turn around failing railroads. Barriger and Fogg established both a business relationship and a lifelong friendship. Barriger commissioned seventeen paintings while President of the Monon and continued to order paintings as he moved to the Pittsburgh & Lake Erie, the Rock Island, and other railroads. With an ever increasing number of commissions from railroads, authors, individuals and industrial firms, Fogg ended his formal agreement with ALCO in 1957, although he continued to receive commissions from them for a number of years.

== Move to Colorado and his later career ==
In 1955, Howard, Margot, and their three sons moved to Boulder, Colorado. Howard and Ed Trumble became close friends, and over the years he created more than 70 paintings for Trumble's Leanin' Tree Publishing line of greeting cards.

Howard produced four LP records of steam locomotives using recordings he made between 1955 and 1960, releasing them on his own imprint Howard Fogg Recordings. They were later reissued by another Boulder company, Owl Records, run by local conservationist Oakleigh Thorne II.

Over the decades magazines featured Fogg and his work. Limited edition prints were issued. Calendars and postcards as well as catalogues used his artwork. Books were written about him and his work, including Fogg and Steam by Frank Clodfelter, Howard Fogg and the Diesel Image by John J. Scala, The Railroad Artistry of Howard Fogg by Ronald C. Hill and Al Chione, and Fogg in the Cockpit by Richard and Janet Fogg.

Whereas his earlier work was almost exclusively in watercolor and primarily for corporations, in later years he worked in both watercolor and oil, with individuals becoming a significant source of commissions. As his fame and reputation grew he had a waiting list measured in years, and he continued to paint until his death in 1996. Per his request his sons scattered his ashes along the Union Pacific railroad tracks on Sherman Hill in Wyoming.

Howard Fogg is often referred to as the dean of American railroad artists. He said of himself that he wasn't an artist who painted trains, but a railroader with a paintbrush, and his love of trains is reflected in his work. Many of the artists that preceded him used exaggerated colors and proportions to emphasize the power and drama of a locomotive. Fogg broke with that tradition and became known for his startling accuracy and realism. He would ensure that every detail was correct, yet his work lost none of the drama and excitement of his predecessors.

== Bibliography ==
- Clodfelter, Frank, Fogg and Steam (A Regional Look At Steam In North America) Pruett Pub Co, May 1978 ISBN 978-0-87108-522-1
- Fogg, Richard & Janet, Fogg in the Cockpit: Howard Fogg-Master Railroad Artist, World War II Fighter Pilot. Casemate Publishers & Book Distributors, July 2011 ISBN 978-1-61200-004-6
- Hill, Ronald, and Chione, Al, The Railroad Artistry of Howard Fogg Cedco Publishing Company Sept 1999 ISBN 978-0-7683-2112-8
- Scala, John, Howard Fogg and the Diesel Image: A Color Compilation of Choice Diesel Locomotive Renditions from Americas Foremost Railroad Illustrator. Weekend Chief Pub Co May 1987 ISBN 978-0-9612814-1-0
