= Michael Christie (conductor) =

American conductor

Michael Christie (born June 30, 1974 in Buffalo, New York) is a Grammy-winning American conductor.

Christie graduated from the Oberlin College Conservatory of Music with a bachelor's degree in trumpet performance. His conducting teachers have included Peter Jaffe, Eiji Oue, and Robert Spano. He first came to international attention in 1995 when he received a special prize for "outstanding potential" at the First International Sibelius Conductor’s Competition in Helsinki at age 21. Following the competition, he became an apprentice conductor with the Chicago Symphony Orchestra and subsequently worked with Daniel Barenboim, conducting both in Chicago and at the Berlin State Opera. From 1996 to 1998, he was associate conductor of the Helsinki Philharmonic. Franz Welser-Möst named Christie assistant conductor at the Zurich Opera for the 1997–98 season.

Christie was the music director of the Colorado Music Festival in Boulder from 2000 to 2013. He is credited with nearly doubling attendance and revenue at the festival during his tenure. He then took the title of music director laureate of the festival.

In December 2004, Christie was appointed music director of the Phoenix Symphony. In August 2005, Christie was named the 5th music director of the Brooklyn Philharmonic, with his first concert in February 2006. His Brooklyn Philharmonic tenure concluded in June 2010. In January 2012, Christie was announced as the next music director of Minnesota Opera. In parallel, he concluded his Phoenix Symphony tenure in 2013, at which time he took the title of music director laureate, for a three-season term. With the Phoenix Symphony, Christie has recorded music of Mark Grey for Naxos Records.

Christie began his tenure as music director of the Minnesota Opera with the 2012–2013 season. In February 2014, Michael Christie's contract with the Minnesota Opera was extended to the 2017–2018 season. With the Minnesota Opera, Christie has conducted world premieres of new three operas, commissioned by the Minnesota Opera as part of its New Works Initiative: Kevin Puts' Silent Night (2011), which won the Pulitzer Prize in music; Puts' The Manchurian Candidate (2015); and Paul Moravec's The Shining (2016). Christie concluded his music directorship of Minnesota Opera at the close of the 2017-2018 season.

Christie won a 2019 Grammy Award (Best Opera Recording) for the world premiere recording of Mason Bates’ The (R)evolution of Steve Jobs with The Santa Fe Opera (PENTATONE). In 2017, he led the world premiere performances at The Santa Fe Opera.

In 2019, Christie was appointed music director of the New West Symphony, serving the greater Los Angeles area in Thousand Oaks and Oxnard, California.

Outside of the USA, Christie was chief conductor of the Queensland Orchestra from 2001 to December 2004. Whilst in Australia, Christie met his future wife Alexis, a medical doctor. The couple married in 2006, and they have two children. The family resides in Minneapolis.

Cultural offices
Preceded by Muhai Tang	Chief Conductor, The Queensland Orchestra; 2001–2004	Succeeded by Johannes Fritzsch
Preceded by Hermann Michael	Music Director, Phoenix Symphony; 2005–2013	Succeeded by Tito Muñoz
Preceded by Robert Spano	Music Director, Brooklyn Philharmonic; 2005–2010	Succeeded by Alan Pierson (artistic director)
Preceded by Giora Bernstein	Music Director, Colorado Music Festival; 2000–2013	Succeeded by Jean-Marie Zeitouni
Preceded by George Manahan (principal conductor)	Music Director, Minnesota Opera; 2012–2018	Succeeded by incumbent
