= A New Day (composition) =

A New Day is a cello concerto written in 2021 by the American composer Joan Tower. The work was commissioned for the cellist Alisa Weilerstein by the Colorado Music Festival, the Cleveland Orchestra, the Detroit Symphony Orchestra, and the National Symphony Orchestra. It was given its world premiere by Weilerstein and the Colorado Music Festival Orchestra conducted by Peter Oundjian at the Colorado Chautauqua on July 25, 2021.

== Composition ==
A New Day has a duration of roughly 24 minutes and spans four movements:

1. Daybreak
2. Working Out
3. Mostly Alone
4. Into the Night

The piece is inscribed "with love to Jeff—my partner of 48 years." In the score program note, Tower reflected, "While composing this piece, I realized that our long time together was getting shorter, becoming more and more precious with each new day..." The movement titles, she thus elaborated, were "suggestions, open to interpretation of what the music might refer to."

=== Instrumentation ===
The work is scored for solo cello and an orchestra comprising two flutes (2nd doubling piccolo), two oboes, two clarinets, two bassoons, two horns, two trumpets, bass trombone, timpani, percussion, and strings.

== Reception ==
Michael Andor Brodeur of The Washington Post highly praised the concerto, writing, "A New Day is one of the most exciting new works I've heard in concert all year." Charles T. Downey of the Washington Classical Review similarly declared it the "Best New Work" of 2022, writing, "Tower's command of the orchestra is unparalleled among American composers, now that Christopher Rouse has left us. The lush Ravelian harmony in the first movement of the piece, co-commissioned by NSO and premiered elsewhere in 2021, made it fit perfectly with the program of Debussy and Ravel."

Jeremy Reynolds Pittsburgh Post-Gazette had a more lukewarm response, however, remarking, "In four movements, soloist Alisa Weilerstein, one of today's most sought-after cellists, deftly explored a vast range of emotions, from dreamy and lucid to frustrated and snappy, with the orchestra weaving commentary throughout. Tower was deliberately vague with her program [...] to let listeners interpret the music for themselves, but with an unfamiliar musical language, a bit more guidance could help the work land."
