= Colorado Chautauqua =

Historic place in Boulder, Colorado, US

- U.S. National Register of Historic Places
- U.S. National Historic Landmark District
- Colorado State Register of Historic Properties
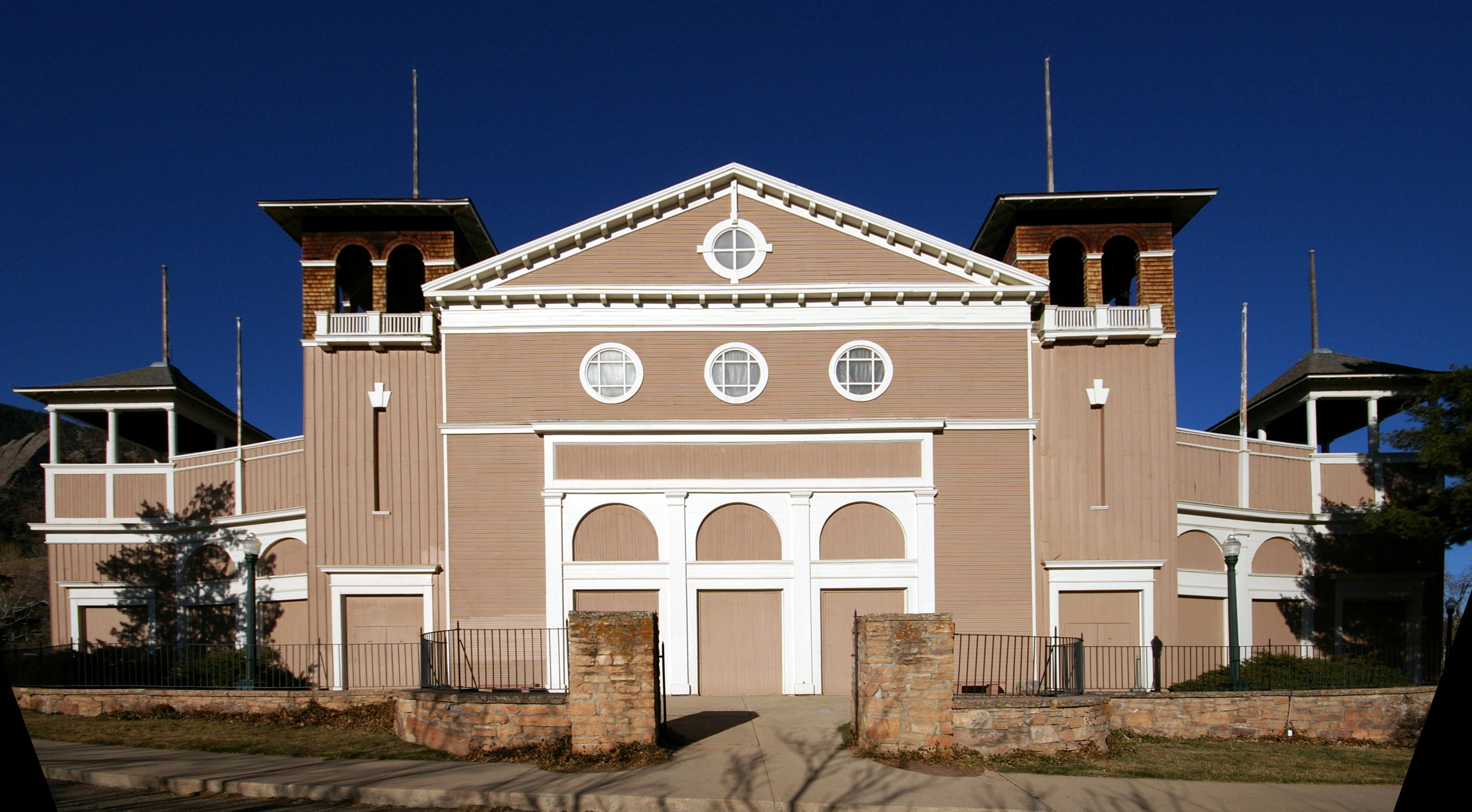
- The Chautauqua Auditorium

- Location within Colorado Location within the United States
- Location: 900 Baseline Road, Boulder, Colorado
- Coordinates: 39°59′52″N 105°16′50″W
- Area: 40 acres (16 ha)
- Built: 1898
- NRHP reference No.: 78000830
- CSRHP No.: 5BL.361

Significant dates
- Added to NRHP: March 21, 1978
- Designated NHLD: February 10, 2006

The Colorado Chautauqua, located in Boulder, Colorado, United States, and started in 1898, is the only Chautauqua west of the Mississippi River still continuing in unbroken operation since the heyday of the Chautauqua Movement in the 1920s. It is one of the few such continuously operating Chautauquas remaining in the United States, and was designated a National Historic Landmark in 2006. According to its governing body, the Colorado Chautauqua Association, it is also unique in that it is the only year-round Chautauqua.

== The Colorado Chautauqua in the 21st century ==
The Colorado Chautauqua Association, a 501(c)(3) nonprofit organization formerly known as the Texas-Colorado Chautauqua Association, presents a variety of lectures, live musical performances, and silent films on a year-round schedule, although the summer months are emphasized. The operation also includes the Chautauqua Dining Hall. Short-term lodging is also offered. The Association manages 26 acres (110,000 m^{2}) leased from the City of Boulder, including the historic Chautauqua buildings, all of which are still in regular use:

- the 1898 Chautauqua Auditorium (listed on the National Register of Historic Places on March 21, 1978)
- the 1898 Dining Hall
- the 1900 Academic Hall (now the Administration Building)
- the 1911 Missions House
- the 1918 Community House
- the 1919 Columbine Lodge
- 98 cottages, constructed between 1899 and 1954 (80 before 1915), some of which are owner-occupied and some of which are rentals offered by the Colorado Chautauqua Association.

Between these 26 acres (110,000 m^{2}) of Association land and Baseline Road lies a 14-acre (57,000 m^{2}) Boulder city park called Chautauqua Park. This area is marked "Chautauqua Green" on the map published by the Colorado Chautauqua Association. Both the park and the Association land are open to the public without an entry fee.

The entire 40-acre (160,000 m^{2}) site, including both the Association land and the adjacent Chautauqua Park, was designated a National Historic Landmark on February 10, 2006. The site is bounded on the north by Baseline Road, on the northeast by residential back yards on 10th Street, and on the southeast, south, and west by the City of Boulder Mountain Parks.

Residents of Boulder generally refer to the entire 40-acre (160,000 m^{2}) site by the single word Chautauqua. In the early years, the site was known as "Texado Park".

== History ==
=== 19th century ===
==== 1897 ====
The Texas-Colorado Chautauqua Association was incorporated in Austin, Texas in September 1897. This organization was for the purpose of conducting a summer school and lecture series for Texas school teachers at a Colorado location to be determined later. A cooler summer climate than Texas was desired.

==== 1898 ====
In February 1898, the Texas-Colorado Chautauqua Association and the City of Boulder entered into an agreement to locate the Chautauqua near Boulder, subject to the city providing sufficient area and suitable facilities. A city bond election was held on April 5, 1898 and the necessary bonds and expenditures were approved to purchase the land and build the first buildings.

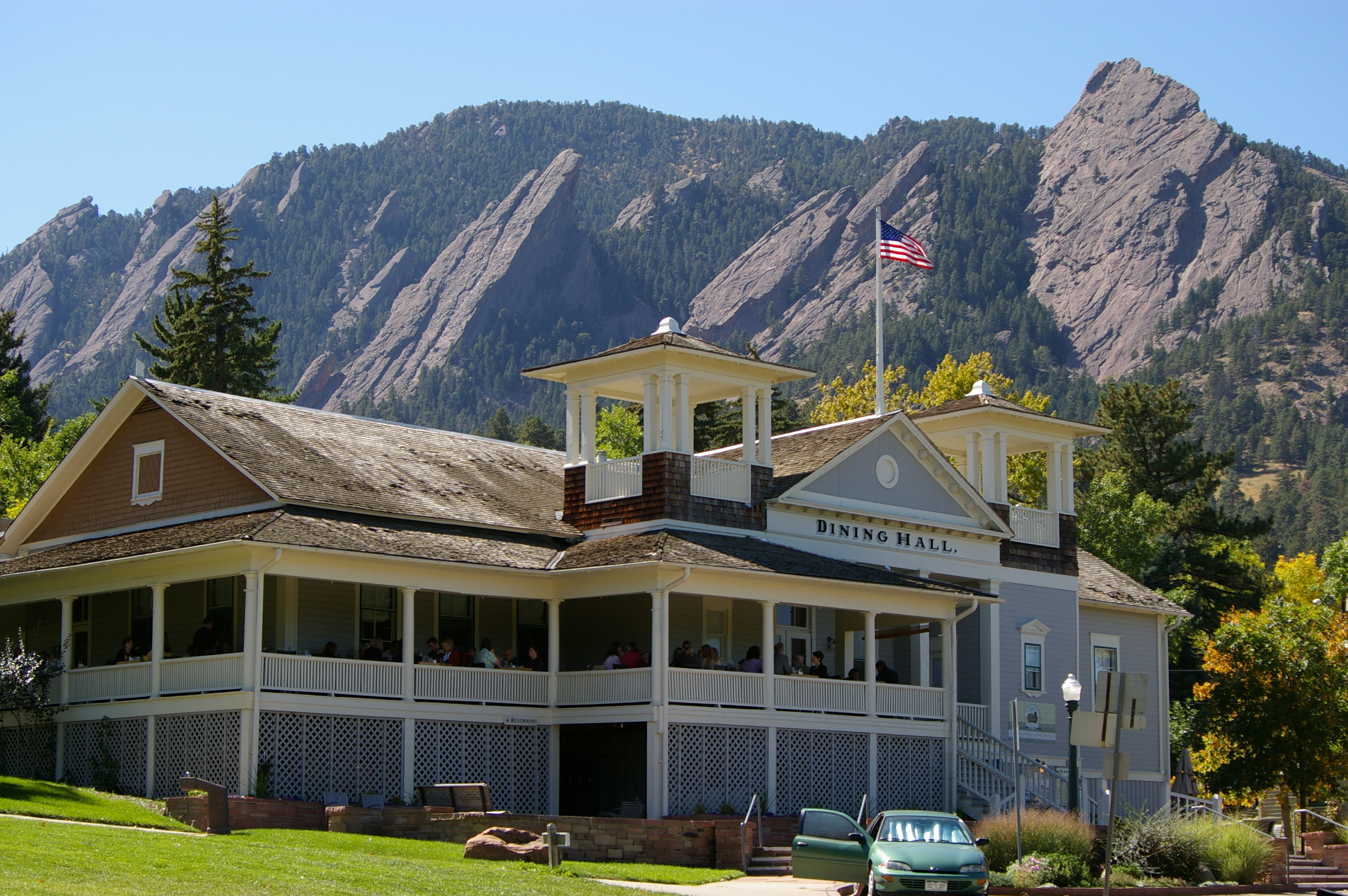
The Dining Hall in Chautauqua park

On April 18, 1898 the Boulder City Council appointed a "Committee on Parks," the earliest beginning of the city's Parks Department. Later in April, the Bachelder Ranch site was selected and purchased for the Chautauqua; the grounds, one mile (1.6 km) south of the city, were named Texado Park. On May 12, 1898 construction of the Chautauqua Auditorium commenced; the Dining Hall construction started one week later. Both buildings were completed in time for the opening of the first Chautauqua season on July 4, 1898.

However, the two greatest disappointments of the initial season were first, that no residential cottages had yet been constructed; and second, that the electric streetcar line from downtown Boulder to Texado Park had not been built in time for the opening. In the first season, Colorado Chautauqua attenders were housed entirely in tents. They traveled the 1.5 miles (about 2 km) from the Boulder railway station to the Chautauqua on foot or in horsedrawn vehicles, via dirt roads that were alternately dusty and muddy.

The 1898 fee was $75 for the entire six-week season, including tuition, admission to all lectures and entertainments, all boarding and lodging, and round-trip rail fare to Boulder from any location within a 100-mile (200 km) radius of Fort Worth, Texas.

The first year's six-week program featured no fewer than 94 scheduled speeches, including addresses from the well-known evangelist T. Dewitt Talmadge, the Kentucky orator Henry Watterson, the governors of Colorado and Texas, the mayor of Boulder, and the president of the University of Colorado. Various clergymen also delivered sermons each Sunday.

The Kansas City Symphony Orchestra was in residence for the entire season, and would return many times in future years. They played a sacred concert each Sunday, and incidental music as requested, often several times a day. Various bands, pianists, and vocalists also performed.

Music classes were offered including cello, guitar, mandolin, piano, singing and chorus. The Collegiate Department of the Chautauqua offered 51 different classes in mathematics, chemistry, botany, physics, psychology, education, as well as English, Latin, Greek, French, and German language and literature.

From that first season, the Colorado Chautauqua also presented motion pictures in the Auditorium. The evening program for July 21, 1898, was "Edison's Genuine Projectoscope, Colorscopic Diorama and Wargraph, with Music, reproducing scenes of the war with Spain."

Other activities included burro and horseback rides, hikes to the nearby Flatirons on Green Mountain, stagecoach rides to Boulder Falls and Eldorado Springs, and mountain railway excursions to destinations as far away as Ward.

The activities of the 1898 Chautauqua season were to continue and expand from that date to the 1920s, except for the Collegiate Department, which was largely supplanted by the summer session of the University of Colorado beginning in 1904.

==== 1899 ====
The Electric Street Railway from downtown Boulder to Texado Park was started in late April 1899 and completed on June 24, 1899, ten days ahead of the opening of the second Colorado Chautauqua season. Cars ran every 15 minutes from 6:30 a.m. to 11:00 p.m., and the fare was five cents.

The first cottages were built in the spring of 1899. At the opening of the second season, between 30 and 40 cottages were available, with the other attenders still residing in tents. Construction of additional cottages continued in later years, although some would stay in tents until 1916.

William Jennings Bryan, the biggest celebrity of the Chautauqua movement, first appeared at the Texas-Colorado Chautauqua on July 12, 1899, drawing a capacity crowd to the Chautauqua Auditorium, with thousands more thronging the adjacent hillsides. The total attendance was about 13,000.

==== 1900 ====
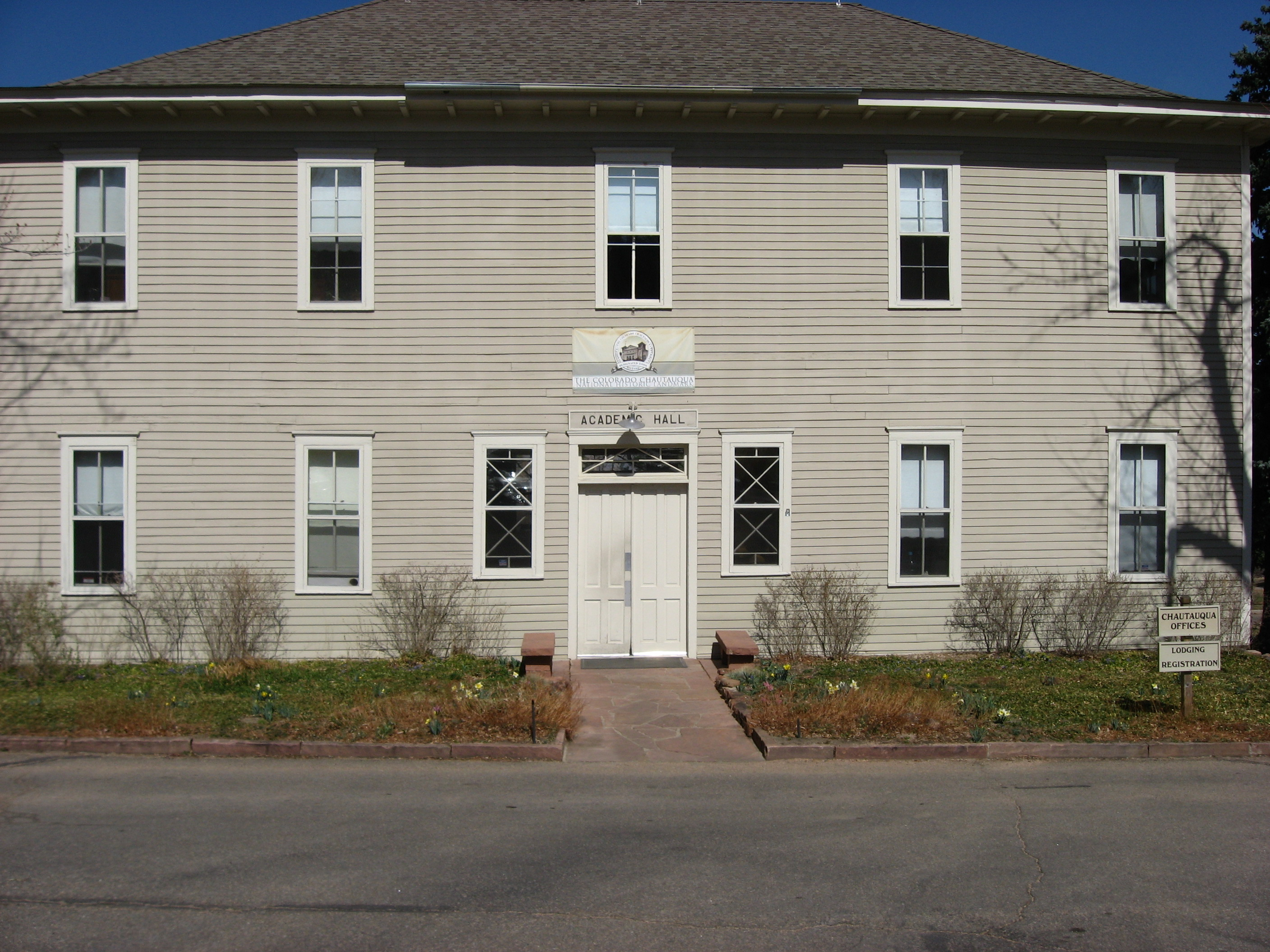
Academic Hall, now the Chautauqua's offices

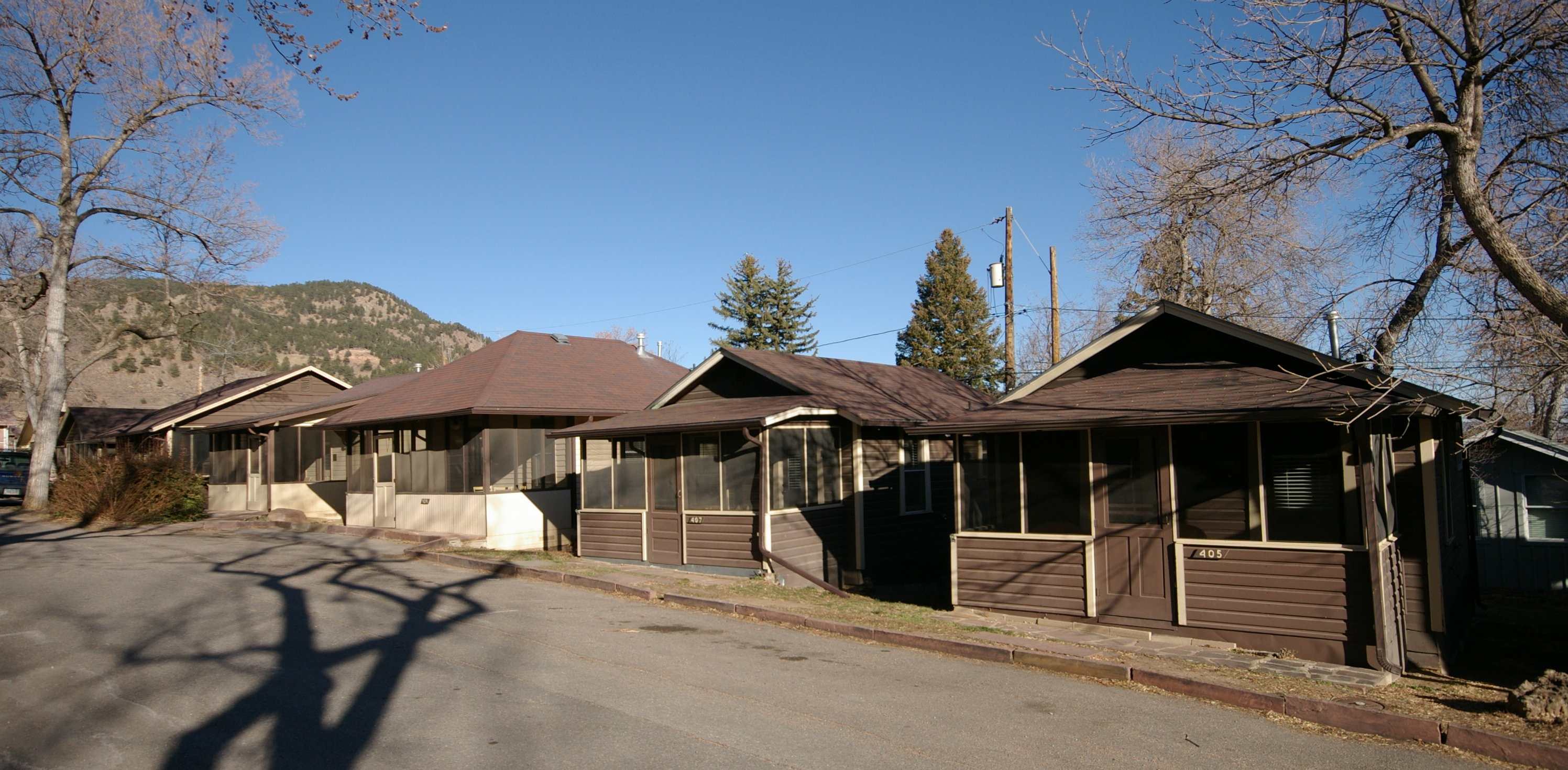
A couple of the cabins at Chautauqua

The Academic Hall was constructed in June 1900. Cottages built in 1900 included the Women's Christian Temperance Union cottage, which offered rooms to members at 50 cents per night. The prohibitionist cause was a continuing theme in the early days of Chautauqua lectures, as were women's suffrage, Populist politics, and a nondenominational Christian message of self-improvement.

Republican and Democratic orators were invited to give campaign speeches for their respective presidential candidates, William McKinley and William Jennings Bryan. Jonathan P. Dolliver spoke on August 20, 1900 and Champ Clark the following week. This experiment was not considered a success, and overtly partisan election-year speeches would not return until 1932.

On December 20, 1900, the Texas-Colorado Chautauqua was reorganized as the Colorado Chautauqua, with an entirely local board of directors. Title to the land remained with the city of Boulder, but the Colorado Chautauqua Association operated the Chautauqua under a long-term lease, since renewed several times.

The reorganization, partly prompted by financial deficits, had both a broadening and a narrowing effect. More emphasis was placed on wooing attenders from states other than Texas, but at the same time The Colorado Chautauqua had become Boulder's own enterprise. More townspeople attended the presentations in the ensuing years. More Boulderites were also directly involved in managing the Chautauqua programs.

=== Early 20th century ===
The early years of the 20th century saw continuing growth and development of the Colorado Chautauqua. One highlight was the appearance of John Philip Sousa and his band at Chautauqua Auditorium in the fall of 1904, after the Chautauqua season was over for that year.

In the first two decades of the Colorado Chautauqua, an average of 40 full evening musical programs were presented each season, which is to say each summer. Dramatic readings from Shakespeare and Ibsen were also staples of the early 20th century Chautauqua experience in Boulder, as were operatic arias. The 1910 program featured "costumed recitals from grand opera" presented by the Chicago Operatic Company on July 4.

The famed evangelist Billy Sunday spoke to large crowds in 1909, 1924, 1925, and 1931. Other evangelists also delivered their message of fire and brimstone to the Chautauquans. According to Chautauqua tradition, all religious observance and preaching was nondenominational, but the growing tide of Fundamentalism made its influence felt through a number of Chautauqua orators as the 20th century progressed.

From the beginning of the Colorado Chautauqua, two or three motion pictures had been presented each year. But starting with the 1918 season, in the face of higher costs for lecturers and entertainers, the Colorado Chautauqua Association decided to increase the number of movies. The Association expressed the intention to maintain the quality of the live stage presentations, although those events would be fewer. They also pledged that the motion pictures selected would be the "best productions on the screen" and would be limited to films that were morally uplifting and suitable for family viewing. Since the Chautauqua lacked the financial resources to compete for first run films with the commercial movie theaters, second-run movies were selected. The 1918 Colorado Chautauqua movie menu included Oliver Twist, The Bluebird, Rebecca of Sunnybrook Farm, and The Vicar of Wakefield, among others.

From 1918 forward, about half of the evening presentations were motion pictures, the other half continuing to be lectures and live entertainment. That formula held for about ten years, after which the movies came to occupy a steadily increasing percentage of the Chautauqua presentations.

=== Middle 20th century ===
Eventually the effects of two world wars, one Great Depression, and the development of many competing entertainment opportunities (especially movies, radio, television, and the automobile) would greatly impact the nature of events held at the Colorado Chautauqua. Under financial pressure, the presentations decreased in variety. Although the Colorado Chautauqua Association continued to schedule a few lectures and musical performances (including annual appearances by groups representing SPEBSQSA and the Sweet Adelines, which persist into the 21st century), by the 1950s the vast majority of activities at the Chautauqua consisted of second-run movies in the Auditorium, presented with marginal projection and sound equipment. The Colorado Chautauqua had entered a dormant period, although some traditions continued, such as the nondenominational summer Sunday School program.

The built-up area of the city of Boulder gradually expanded, reaching the boundaries of the Chautauqua site by the 1940s. Chautauqua became part of the city, although it was still at the edge of the City of Boulder Mountain Parks. Over the years many of the cottages were winterized for year-round use. The Colorado Chautauqua became, in part, a residential district for Boulderites.

=== Late 20th century ===
The 1970s saw a crisis in the history of the Colorado Chautauqua. Attendance and revenue were declining. The buildings were deteriorating. The Chautauqua Association's 1941 lease on the land was scheduled to expire in 1981. The city of Boulder was entertaining various ideas for the Chautauqua grounds including demolition in favor of building a new convention center on the site.

In 1974, Daily Camera editor Laurence Paddock completed an application to list the Chautauqua Auditorium on the National Register of Historic Places. When this listing came about in 1978, the city shifted its planning from demolition to restoration. The historic preservation designation of the Auditorium was the turning point for The Colorado Chautauqua as it exists today.

The Colorado Chautauqua gradually returned to its roots in the late 20th century, scheduling much more live music and a modest number of additional lectures. Jazz and bluegrass concerts were introduced, with good popular success. Guest performers have included composer-pianist Peter Kater, Native American flutist R. Carlos Nakai, Doc Watson, Hot Rize, George Winston, Bill Monroe, Lyle Lovett, Randy Newman, Bobby McFerrin, Bruce Cockburn, Suzanne Vega, Bela Fleck, Roger McGuinn, Loudon Wainwright III, Michelle Shocked, and the Boulder Philharmonic Orchestra, among others.

The biggest positive impact on the Chautauqua was the arrival, in 1978, of the Colorado Music Festival including the Festival Orchestra under the direction of Giora Bernstein, in residence each summer for dozens of performances. The Colorado Music Festival remains an annual summer fixture at Chautauqua (more recently under the direction of Michael Christie) into the 21st century, presenting a variety of music with the most commonly featured composers being Mozart, Stravinsky, and Beethoven.

Chautauqua audiences of the late 20th century have enjoyed lectures from Hunter S. Thompson, Al Gore, Jesse Jackson, Colorado governor Roy Romer, and Congressman David Skaggs of Colorado, among others. Political campaign speeches were brought back to the Chautauqua in the 1996 season for the first time since 1932.

In response to competition from home VCRs, the second-run family films were discontinued in 1995. The Chautauqua film tradition continues, however, with a silent film series that began in 1986 and persists into the 21st century, featuring live piano accompaniment by Hank Troy and other students of Photoplay music.

The Dining Hall was refurbished in 1979 and the food service contracted out. For the first time, the Chautauqua Dining Hall became a destination restaurant (which it still is in the 21st century) and ceased to be a financial drain on the Colorado Chautauqua Association. The Dining Hall's license to serve wine and beer, however, represents something of a break with Chautauqua's prohibitionist past.

From a near-collapse in the early 1970s, The Colorado Chautauqua recovered to become a permanent part of the Boulder community and a piece of living history.

=== 21st century ===
Currently, during the summer months, The Colorado Chautauqua hosts the Colorado Music Festival (CMF) in the Chautauqua Auditorium. The festival is six weeks long and showcases the Colorado Music Festival Orchestra. Due to its programming by national and international musicians, the festival recently earned recognition from the League of American Orchestras and the National Endowment for the Arts. During the summer 2020 season, the Colorado Music Festival held a series of online concerts due to the Covid-19 global pandemic.

== See also ==
- National Register of Historic Places listings in Boulder County, Colorado
