= Niloufar Talebi =

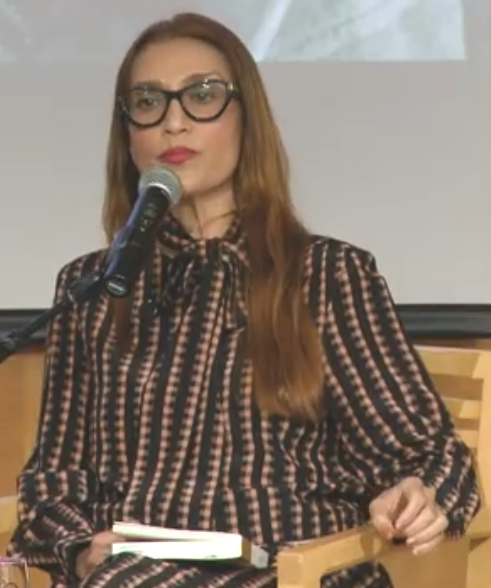
- In a 2025 interview
- Born: London, England
- Education: University of California, Irvine, Bennington College
- Occupations: Author, Librettist, Literary Translator, Multidisciplinary artist, Producer
- Notable work: Elegies of the Earth, Self-Portrait in Bloom, Abraham in Flames opera, Belonging: New Poetry by Iranians Around the World, Atash Sorushan (Fire Angels), Epiphany, The Plentiful Peach, The Persian Rite of Spring, ICARUS/RISE
- Website: www.niloufartalebi.com

Niloufar Talebi (Persian: نیلوفر طالبی) is an author, literary translator, librettist, multidisciplinary artist, and producer. Her work moves between original writing, literary translation, and large-scale interdisciplinary collaborations. She is a TEDx speaker and founder of Creative Intelligence.

Talebi is the editor and translator of Elegies of the Earth: Selected Poems by Ahmad Shamlou (World Poetry Books, 2025), a bilingual edition presenting new English translations of one of Iran's most influential modern poets. She is also the author of the hybrid memoir Self-Portrait in Bloom (l’Aleph, 2019) and the editor and translator of the anthology Belonging: New Poetry by Iranians Around the World (North Atlantic Books, 2008).

Her work includes a body of projects in sustained dialogue with Shamlou's life and work, including Elegies of the Earth, Self-Portrait in Bloom, her 2019 TEDx talk, "On Making Beauty After Agony", and the opera Abraham in Flames.

Her performance works have been commissioned and presented by, and/or performed at Carnegie Hall, Cal Performances, Atlanta Symphony Orchestra, American Lyric Theater, Hammer Museum, Los Angeles County Museum of Art, Craft and Folk Art Museum, Riverside Theatre, Royce Hall, ODC/Dance Theater, Berkeley Repertory Theatre, Magic Theatre, Intersection for the Arts, SOMArts Cultural Center, John F. Kennedy Center for the Performing Arts, Stanford University, and Brooklyn Academy of Music.

In addition to her artistic practice, Talebi has taught creative writing and creativity-based courses for over a decade, working with students and professionals across disciplines to awaken process-driven approaches to creative work.

== Works ==
=== Elegies of the Earth: Selected Poems by Ahmad Shamlou (2025) ===
This centennial bilingual edition of Ahmad Shamlou's poetry, edited and translated by Niloufar Talebi, presents a representative selection of his work in English translation.

=== Funeral Address (2020) ===
Funeral Address is a videopoem based on Ahmad Shamlou's poem "خطابه ی تدفین".

=== Self-Portrait in Bloom (2019) ===
A lyrical exploration of the self and a literary portrait of Ahmad Shamlou, the memoir is told in fragments of prose, poetry, photographs, and Talebi's English translation of 30 poems by Ahmad Shamlou. Author Amy Tan says of Self-Portrait in Bloom: "Brilliant writers can have brilliant debuts..." The Rumpus praises it as "a hybrid wonder" in an epistolary review that The Poetry Foundation calls a "fan letter."

=== Abraham in Flames (2019) ===
An opera for girls chorus inspired by the life and writings of Iranian poet, Ahmad Shamlou, conceived and co-created by Talebi with composer Aleksandra Vrebalov and director Roy Rallo. Abraham in Flames world premiered as an immersive performance on 9–12 May 2019 at San Francisco's Z Space to critical acclaim. The title of the opera is adapted from the title of Shamlou's 1974 book of poems, Abraham in Flames (Ebrahim dar Aatash, Persian: ابراهیم در آتش, elsewhere translated under the title, Abraham in the Fire). Joshua Kosman of the San Francisco Chronicle listed Abraham in Flames as a Best in 2019 in classical and new music performances. The project was commissioned, produced, and presented by Niloufar Talebi Projects.

In October 2019 The Knight of Illumination Awards USA announced that Abraham in Flames production and lighting designer Heather Carson was shortlisted in its "Lighting Award for Opera" category.

=== Vis & I (2017) ===
Translation of the 1998 Novel of the Year (Persian Literature Award) by Farideh Razi. The International Journal of Persian Literature wrote, "This book serves as a testament to how a translation can bring alive a work of brilliant prose by keeping intact vivid images...Farideh Razi’s depiction of the classically ingrained ideas and ideals of the Iranian mind as pertains to romance and its epic proportions is NOT lost in translation...Talebi deserves recognition for being a new resounding—and resonating—voice for Persian creative writing through her insightful translation."

=== Epiphany (2015) ===
Talebi was the librettist for an immersive requiem inspired by the Latin Mass and Tibetan Book of the Dead, with composer-impresario and Visionintoart founder, Paola Prestini, and visual artist Ali Hossaini and the Young People's Chorus of New York City founded by MacArthur Fellow Francisco J. Núñez. World premiere at the BAM Next Wave Festival of the Brooklyn Academy of Music, 4–7 November 2015, and was performed as a concert at the Brooklyn-based venue, National Sawdust as part of the VIA Ferus Festival on 15 January 2016.

=== The Plentiful Peach (2015) ===
Adaptation of a children's story (Persian: یک هلو هزار هلو) by the Iranian writer Samad Behrangi with composer Mark Grey for the Los Angeles Children's Chorus. World premiere at Stanford University's Bing Theater (Stanford Live), 19 April 2015, and was performed during the LACC summer 2015 USA tour.

=== The Investment (2014) ===
Talebi is librettist for a one-act opera, with composer John Liberatore, set in Silicon Valley, and commissioned by the Washington National Opera's American Opera Initiative, (premiered at the John F. Kennedy Center for the Performing Arts, November 2014).

=== The Disinherited (2014) ===
Talebi is librettist of a one-act opera with composer Clarice Assad, during her Artist Residency in the American Lyric Theater Composer Librettist Development Program (2013–2014). The Disinherited is set in 1983 Tehran during the Iran-Iraq war, when the fate and safety of a young boy who could be forced to walk over and clear minefields lies between tightly held family secrets. It had a workshop performance at Symphony Space Thalia theater in New York City with mezzo-soprano Sarah Heltzel as Mina Safavi, bass-baritone Adrian Rosas as Bahram Safavi, and tenor Glenn Seven Allen as Shayan Safavi (16 June 2014).

=== Ātash Sorushān (Fire Angels) (2011) ===
Talebi wrote the libretto for this song cycle reflecting on the decade since 9/11 with composer Mark Grey for Soprano Jessica Rivera and tenor Stuart Skelton. The chamber version of Ātash Sorushān (Fire Angels) was co-commissioned by Meet the Composer, Carnegie Hall (World premiere, 29 March 2011), and Cal Performances, (West Coast-premiere, 3 April 2011). The expanded and orchestral version was commissioned by the Atlanta Symphony Orchestra (ASO) (World premiere, 20–21 March 2014).

=== The Persian Rite of Spring: the story of Nowruz (2010) ===
The Persian Rite of Spring: the story of Nowruz world premiered at the Los Angeles County Museum of Art, on 14 March 2010. The multimedia performance that brings to life the mythology, poetry, music, and folklore of Nowruz/Norouz from Winter Solstice through 13-bedar: یلدا جشن سده چهارشنبه سوری نوروز سیزده بدر. Created and narrated by Niloufar Talebi, with music and video by Bobak Salehi.

=== Belonging: New Poetry by Iranians Around the World (2008) ===
Talebi is the Editor and Translator of the anthology, Belonging: New Poetry by Iranians Around the World (North Atlantic Books, 2008), featuring 18 contemporary Iranian poets living outside of Iran since the 1979 Iranian Revolution.

=== ICARUS/RISE (2007) ===
ICARUS/RISE (World premiere, Theatre Artaud, 15–17 November 2007) is a multimedia theatrical performance of 17 poems from Belonging: New Poetry by Iranians Around the World woven together to tell the 30-year story of the Iranian migration. Created and recited/performed by Niloufar Talebi, with dramaturgy by poet/translator Zack Rogow, music by Bobak Salehi, dance and video by Alex Ketley.

=== Midnight Approaches (2006) ===
A collection of several short videopoems including some footage from the performances of Four Springs. Select video-poems were published by Rattapallax magazine and have screened at festivals internationally, including at the Berlin Zebra Poetry Film Festival, and Visible Verse Festival in Canada.

=== Four Springs (2004) ===
A multimedia and theatrical performance dramatizing 10 poems from Belonging: New Poetry by Iranians Around the World. Performances were at the ODC Theater, and the Mexican Heritage Plaza in the San Francisco Bay Area. Talebi recited/performed the poems in collaboration with composers Hafez Modirzadeh and Mohamad Nejad, and dance artists from Ballet Afsaneh.

== Honors and awards ==
- 2026 The Academy of American Poets Harold Morton Landon Translation Award
- 2024 National Endowment for the Arts Translation Fellowship
- 2022 San Francisco Arts Commission SF Artist grant
- 2021–2022 Fulbright U.S. Scholar Fulbright Program
- 2017 California Arts Council
- 2017 New Music USA
- 2016 Creative Work Fund
- 2008 Belonging: New Poetry by Iranians Around the World nominated for the Northern California Book Award
- 2006 PEN American Center/New York State Council on the Arts Anthology grant
- 2006 Willis Barnstone Translation Prize
- 2004 International Center for Writing and Translation Prize

== Selected Publications ==
- "Among the Eternal Suns: An Interview". Asymptote. 12 March 2026.
- "from Elegies of the Earth". Asymptote. July 2025.
- "Home Proxy Home & Preface". Evergreen Review. 2023.
- "Iran's Master Poet of Freedom: On Ahmad Shamlou". Los Angeles Review of Books. 12 December 2022.
- "To Be or Not To Be, That is Not the Question: Reflections on Ahmad Shamlou at 95". The Markaz Review. 12 December 2020.
- "100 Essential Books by Iranian Writers". The Margins. 2020.
- Ahmadi, Fereshteh (28 March 2019). The Book of Tehran, edited by Fereshteh Ahmadi, Comma Press. Comma Press. ISBN 978-1910974247. Translator contributor
- "So You Want to Make an Opera". San Francisco Classical Voice. 2018.
- Talebi, Niloufar (July–August 2009). "Memory of a Phoenix Feather: Iranian Storytelling Traditions and Contemporary Theater". World Literature Today. 83 (4): 49–53. doi:10.1353/wlt.2009.0306. JSTOR 20621658. S2CID 160657511.
- "The Art and Politics of Translation". PBS. 23 January 2009.
