= 21st-century Chautauquas =

List of present-day Chautauquas

The Chautauqua adult education movement flourished in the late 19th and early 20th centuries, then declined. However, some Independent Chautauquas still operate today, and these are the 21st century Chautauquas. They are divided into two categories, Continuously Operating Chautauquas and Revival Chautauquas.

== Continuously Operating Chautauquas ==
All references agree that at least these five Chautauquas have continued operations, without missing a year, from the heyday of the Chautauqua Movement (1920s or earlier) into the 21st Century:

- Chautauqua Institution (the original Chautauqua in New York State).
- Lakeside Chautauqua in Lakeside, Ohio
- Monteagle Sunday School Assembly in Monteagle, Tennessee
- Colorado Chautauqua in Boulder, Colorado
- New Piasa Chautauqua Chautauqua, Illinois

In addition, several other entities self-report that their activities constitute Continuously Operating Chautauquas:

- Bay View Association in Bay View, Michigan
- State of New Mexico Chautauqua program, operated by NM Humanities Council
- Martha's Vineyard Camp Meeting Association in Oak Bluffs, Massachusetts
- Ocean Grove Camp Meeting Association in Ocean Grove, New Jersey
- Miami Valley Chautauqua Association in Miamisburg, Ohio
- Fountain Park Chautauqua in Fountain Park, Indiana
- Ocean Park Association in Ocean Park, Maine
- Pennsylvania Chautauqua in Mt. Gretna, Pennsylvania
- various other Sunday School Assemblies

== Revival Chautauquas ==
Some other organizations have honored the Chautauqua tradition by starting (or restarting) similar operations in the late 20th and early 21st centuries. Examples include the following:

- Muskoka Chautauqua in Windermere, Ontario (1916–1932, 1997–present)
- Lake Superior Big Top Chautauqua near Bayfield, WI Bayfield, WI
- Chautauqua-by-the-Sea at Ocean Park, Old Orchard Beach, Maine
- The annual Chautauqua Festival held in Wytheville, Virginia since 1985
- Chautauqua Andrews Valley Experience in Andrews, North Carolina
- The Florida Chautauqua Assembly held in DeFuniak Springs, Florida since 1996
- The New Piasa Chautauqua in Chautauqua, Illinois
- The Waxahachie Chautauqua held in Waxahachie, Texas since 2000
- The New Old Time Chautauqua touring the Pacific Northwest since 1981
- The Greenville Chautauqua Society
- Chautauqua-Wawasee Primarily operates from Oakwood Park in Syracuse, Indiana, on the shores of Lake Wawasee since 2011.
