= Chautauqua Lake (Copiah County, Mississippi) =

- Location within Mississippi Location within the United States
- Location: Copiah County, Mississippi
- Coordinates: 31°59′53″N 90°21′55″W
- Type: reservoir
- Basin countries: United States
- Surface elevation: 390 ft (120 m)

Chautauqua Lake is a reservoir in the U.S. state of Mississippi.

The lake's name is a transfer from Chautauqua Lake, in New York.
