= Giora Bernstein =

Violinist and conductor

Giora Bernstein (Hebrew: גיורא ברנשטיין; born 1933) is a conductor, classical violinist, and Professor Emeritus of Music at the University of Colorado. He was the founder of the Colorado Music Festival and its Artistic Director for 24 years.

== Biography ==
Giora Bernstein was born in Vienna in 1933 and emigrated to Palestine (now Israel) in 1938, arriving there in 1939. He began his music education in Israel, where he studied violin from 1953 to 1955 at the Tel Aviv Music Academy, as well as music history with Leo Kestenberg. In 1955, he went to the United States, where he studied violin with Edouard Dethier at the Juilliard School, and later received a Master of Fine Arts in composition from Brandeis University. He went on to study for his Doctorate in Music at Boston University, graduating in 1967. His PhD thesis was on the influence of oriental music idioms on Israeli contemporary music.

Bernstein was a violinist with the Boston Symphony Orchestra from 1963 until 1967 and then moved to California to become a professor at Pomona College. During his time at Pomona College, he founded the Claremont Music Festival and served as its Music Director from 1968 to 1975. In 1975, Bernstein was appointed Professor of Music and head of the conducting program at the University of Colorado. The following year, he founded the Colorado Music Festival and became its first Artistic Director, a post he held until 2000. Under his directorship the festival was the venue for several world and North American premieres, and won five ASCAP Adventurous Programming Awards.

A champion of contemporary music, Bernstein has played in or conducted several world premieres. New works were a feature of his programming at both the Claremont Music Festival which originally commissioned Paul Chihara's Grass, and the Colorado Music Festival, where both Tōru Takemitsu's Dreamtime and Krzysztof Penderecki's Concerto for viola and orchestra received their North American premieres.

Since his retirement, Giora Bernstein has been based in Vienna, where he plays violin in chamber concerts, although he has periodically returned to the Colorado Music Festival as a guest conductor.

== Premieres ==
Giora Bernstein has played in or conducted the world premieres of the following works:

- Peter Pindar Stearns' String Quartet No. 3 in A minor (Giora Bernstein and Sheila Manuel, violins; Jesse Levine, viola; Joanne Manuel, cello), New York City, 21 February 1958.
- John Bavicchi's Sonata for violin and piano No. 2 (Giora Bernstein, violin; George Zilzer, piano) Boston, Massachusetts, 26 July 1959
- Malloy M. Miller's Poem (Giora Bernstein, violin; George Zilzer, piano) Brookline, Massachusetts, 16 November 1960
- William Thomas McKinley's Concerto for clarinet and orchestra (Richard Stoltzman, clarinet; Colorado Music Festival Orchestra; Giora Bernstein, conductor) Boulder, Colorado, 5 July 1980

== Sources ==
- Boston Symphony Orchestra, Concert Bulletins, Issues 1-12, 1963
- Blotner, Linda Solow, The Boston Composers Project: A bibliography of contemporary music, MIT Press, 1983. ISBN 0-262-02198-6
- Bernstein, Giora G., The influence of oriental music idioms on the contemporary music of Israel, Boston University, 1966.
- Chihara, Paul, Liner notes: Chihara Guitar Concerto, Albany Records, 2005 (accessed 13 December 2009)
- International Leo Kestenberg Society, Biography: Giora Bernstein (accessed 13 December 2009)
- Siddons, James, Toru Takemitsu: a bio-bibliography, Greenwood Publishing Group, 2001. ISBN 0-313-27237-9
- Sigma Alpha Iota, Pan Pipes, Volume 50, Issue 2, 1958
- Shulgold, Marc (June 12, 1996). "20 Years of High Notes, Giora Bernstein Ignores Naysayers to Build the Award-winning Colorado Music Festival". Rocky Mountain News. Denver, CO. Archived from the original on November 2, 2012 – via HighBeam Research.
- Shulgold, Marc, "Building a better fest", Rocky Mountain News, 22 June 2006 (accessed 13 December 2009)
- University of Colorado at Boulder, Faculty - College of Music (accessed 13 December 2009)
