= New Day Dawning =

New Day Dawning may refer to:

- New Day Dawning (Cherish the Ladies album) (1996)
- New Day Dawning (Wynonna Judd album) (2000)
