= Colorado Music Festival =

American classical music festival

Coordinates: 39°59′51.42″N 105°16′46.64″W

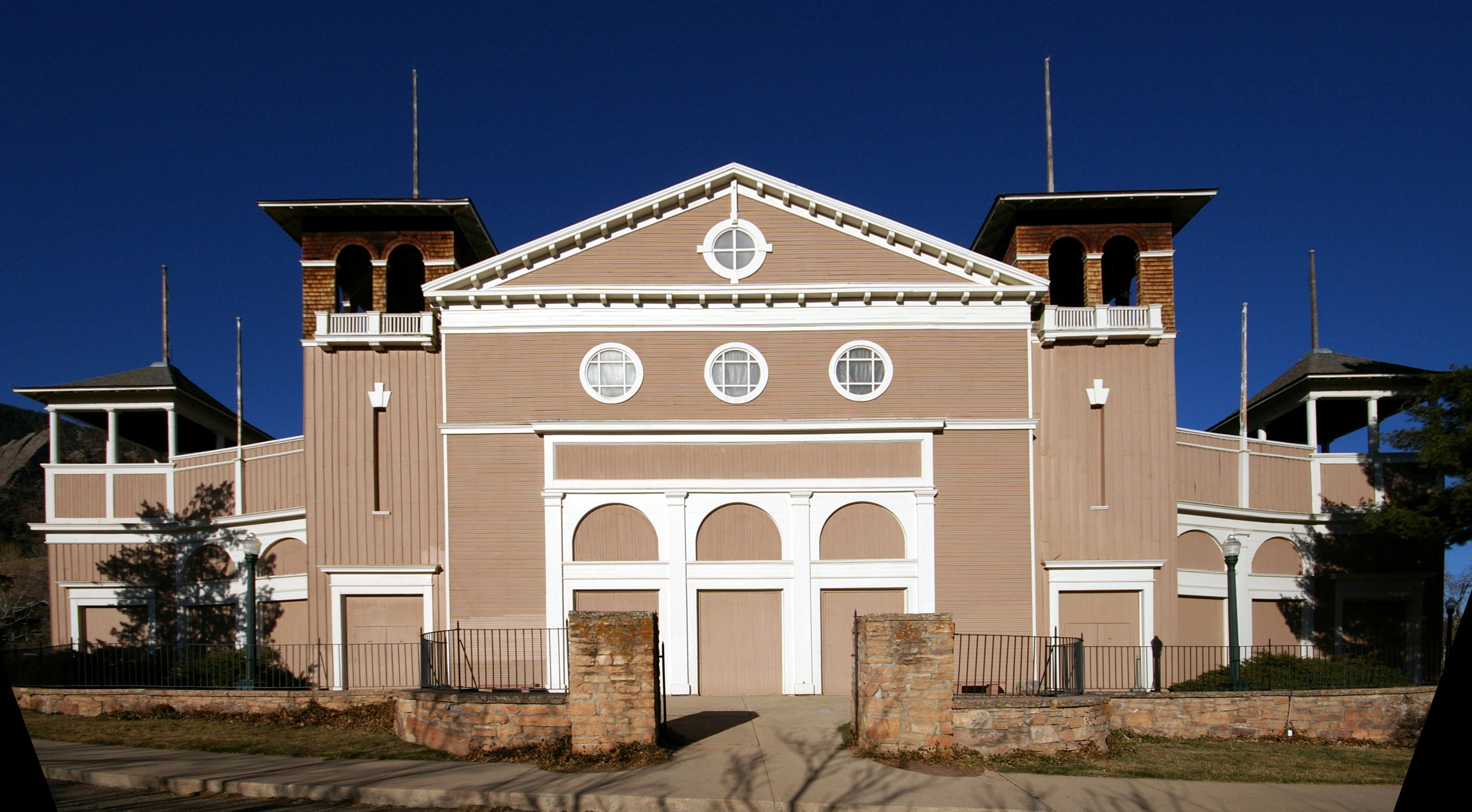
The Chautauqua Auditorium (Boulder, Colorado) Colorado Music Festival's principal performance venue

The Colorado Music Festival is a classical music festival in Boulder, Colorado. It was founded in 1976 by the Vienna-born conductor and violinist, Giora Bernstein and presents an annual summer season of concerts in Boulder's Chautauqua Auditorium performed by the Colorado Music Festival Orchestra as well as visiting artists and ensembles. The festival runs from late June to early August with a focus on orchestral and chamber music. Orchestra members representing many of North America's best professional orchestras come to Colorado to participate. Its current music director is Peter Oundjian.

== History ==
The festival began life as the Colorado Chamber Orchestra founded in 1976 by Giora Bernstein, the newly appointed head of the conducting program at University of Colorado. In 1977, its first series of concerts were given in Boulder's First Presbyterian Church. Guest soloists in the five-concert initial season included the soprano Judith Raskin, clarinetist Richard Stoltzman, cellist Leonard Rose and violinist Sidney Harth.

Following restoration work in 1978, the Chautauqua Auditorium, a national historic landmark, became the festival's home. Its inaugural Chautauqua season brought the festival the first of five ASCAP Adventurous Programming Awards. On Giora Bernstein's retirement in 2000, the American conductor, Michael Christie was appointed music director. After he stepped down, Jean-Marie Zeitouni was appointed to the position in 2014.

Under Christie's directorship, the festival's ticket sales increased by 42 percent and more new works were added to the programming such as the 2005 world premiere of Mark Grey's Pursuit. He also initiated Intermission Insights, where guest artists come back onstage after the first half of their performance for a ten-minute conversation with Christie about their performance followed by questions from the audience.

In 2009, the Rocky Mountain Center for Musical Arts merged with the Colorado Music Festival to become its Education Division.

As of January 2019, Peter Oundjian is the music director for the Colorado Music Festival. In 2024, Oundjian renewed his contract through 2029.

== Premieres ==
Regional and world premieres at the festival include:

- William Thomas McKinley's Concerto for clarinet and orchestra (world premiere, 1980)
- Tōru Takemitsu's Dreamtime (North American premiere, 1983)
- Krzysztof Penderecki's Concerto for viola and orchestra, (North American premiere, 1995)
- Mark Grey's Pursuit (world premiere, 2005)
- Terry Riley's Sun Rings (Colorado premiere, 2006)
- Mark Grey's Elevation (world premiere, 2006)
- Mark Grey's Enemy Slayer: A Navajo Oratorio (Colorado premiere, 2008)
- Behzad Ranjbaran's Seven Passages, the third part of his Persian Trilogy (Colorado premiere, 2009)
- Tan Dun's Pipa Concerto (Colorado premiere, 2009)
- Aaron Jay Kernis's Elegy (for those we've lost), (world premiere, 2021)
- Hannah Lash's Forestallings (world premiere, 2021)
- Joan Tower's A New Day (world premiere, 2021)
- Joel Thompson's To Awaken the Sleeper (world premiere, 2021)
- Timo Andres' Dark Patterns (world premiere, 2022)
- Wang Jie's Flying on the Scaly Backs of Our Mountains (world premiere, 2022)
- Wynton Marsalis' Herald, Holler and Hallelujah! (Colorado premiere, 2022)
- Jordan Holloway's Flatiron Escapades (world premiere, 2023)
- Carter Pann's Dreams I Must Not Speak (world premiere, 2023)
- Adolphus Hailstork's JFK: The Last Speech (world premiere, 2023)
- Gabriela Lena Frank's Kachkaniraqmi (world premiere, 2024)

== Sources ==
- Blotner, Linda Solow, The Boston Composers Project: A bibliography of contemporary music, MIT Press, 1983. ISBN 0-262-02198-6
- Colorado Music Festival, Press release: "Colorado Music Festival and Rocky Mountain Center for Musical Arts Announce Plans to Merge", 13 April 2009.
- MacMillan, Kyle, "Christie's back at home helming Colorado Music fest", Denver Post, 30 June 2008
- Siddons, James, Toru Takemitsu: a bio-bibliography, Greenwood Publishing Group, 2001. ISBN 0-313-27237-9
- Shulgold, Marc (June 12, 1996). "20 Years of High Notes, Giora Bernstein Ignores Naysayers to Build the Award-winning Colorado Music Festival". Rocky Mountain News. Denver, CO. Archived from the original on November 2, 2012 – via HighBeam Research.
- Fantz, Christy, , Daily Camera, 31 January 2019
- Allen, David (2022-08-05). "A Road Trip to Sample America's Many, Many Music Festivals". The New York Times. ISSN 0362-4331.
