= Chautauqua Park Historic District =

Historic district in Iowa, United States

- U.S. National Register of Historic Places
- U.S. Historic district
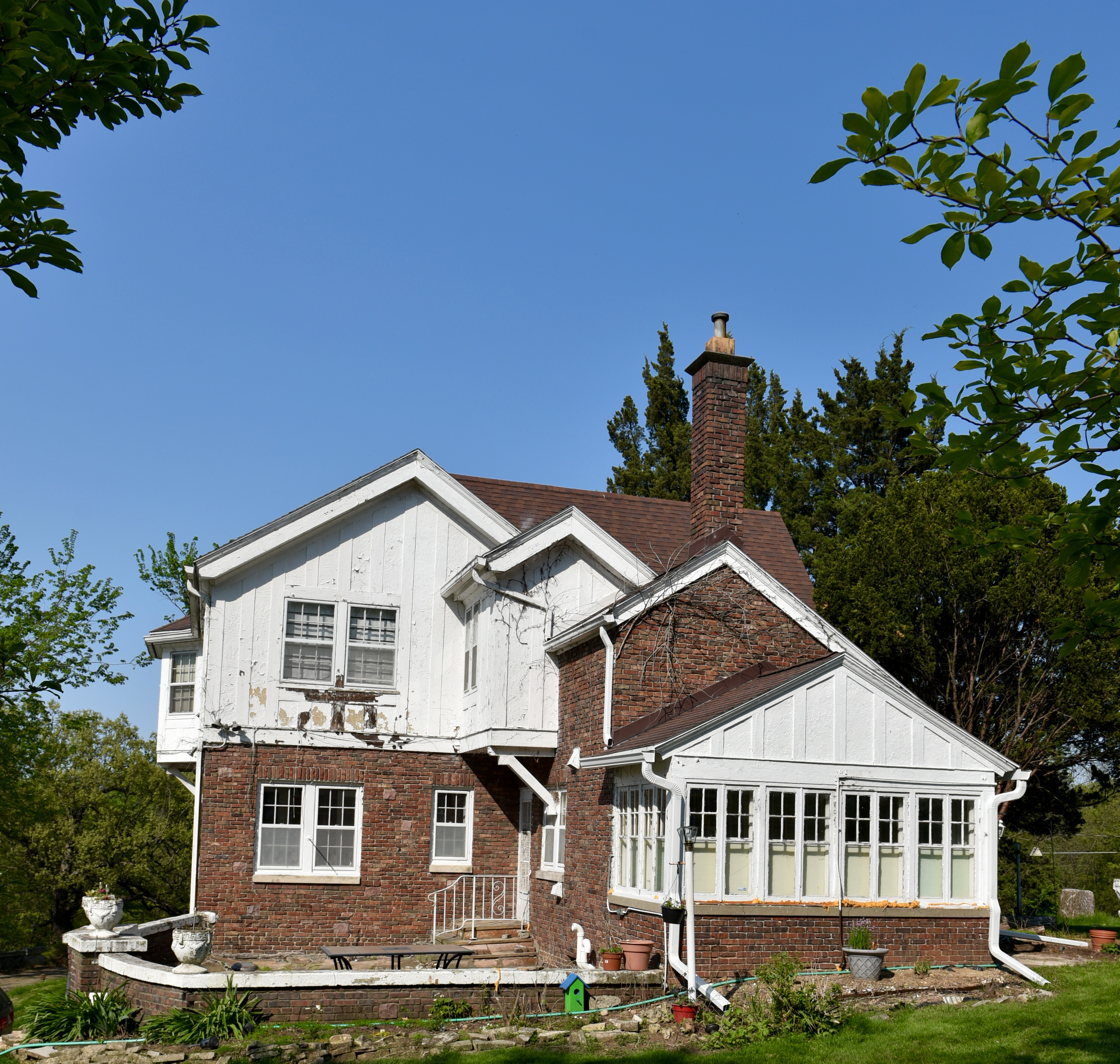

- Location within Iowa Location within the United States
- Location: Roughly bounded by 16th St., Hickman Rd., and the Chautauqua Parkway; Des Moines, Iowa
- Coordinates: 41°36′46″N 93°38′06″W
- Area: 67 acres (27 ha)
- Architect: L. Earl Foglesong, et al.
- Architectural style: Tudor Revival
- MPS: Suburban Development in Des Moines Between the World Wars, 1918--1941 MPS
- NRHP reference No.: 89001776
- Added to NRHP: March 22, 1990

The Chautauqua Park Historic District is located on the north side of Des Moines, Iowa, United States. It has been listed on the National Register of Historic Places since 1990. It is part of the Suburban Development in Des Moines Between the World Wars, 1918--1941 MPS.

== History ==
The name Chautauqua Park refers to the Chautauqua assembly grounds that occupied the property from 1896 to around the turn of the 20th century. The assembly hall, which was said to hold 3,000 people, was located at the present intersection of Nash Drive and Chautauqua Parkway. Senators Robert La Follette and Jonathan P. Dolliver as well as Booker T. Washington lectured in the pavilion.

Des Moines University acquired the property after it was no longer used for Chautauqua gatherings. They planned to build a new campus on the site, but financial problems prevented them carrying out their plans. The school merged with Highland Park College in 1918 and later ceased its operations. In 1923 they decided to develop the roughly 60 acres (24 ha) site as a residential subdivision. Original plans for the subdivision included Douglas Park. The park is seven acres (2.8 ha) and features a heavily wooded hillside. The creek that ran through the park is now mostly dry.

== Architecture ==
Des Moines landscape architect L. Earl Foglesong, who was responsible for the Iowa State Capitol grounds and the Iowa State Fairgrounds, designed Chautauqua Park. Chautauqua Park's plat features narrow curved roadways that follow the topography of the land. There are no sidewalks in the neighborhood. The district contains 166 properties, of which 118 are houses, 45 are garages and an object (entry posts). Seventy-five houses, 24 garages and the entry posts are contributing properties. The properties that are not contributing were either built after 1941 or have been significantly altered in the years since they were built.

Twenty-nine houses were built in the subdivision between 1925 and 1930. Building slowed during the Great Depression when 12 houses were built. Between 1938 and 1941 another 51 houses were built. The houses are generally 1½ stories, constructed of brick and feature intersecting gables. They are primarily Tudor Revival in style. There are also some in a local style of based on the Tudor style known as "Beaverdale Brick." Because Chautauqua Park was built as a commuter suburb, many of the houses were built with attached garages.

There are two entry posts at 13th Street and Chautauqua Parkway that were constructed around 1929. They were constructed of brick with stone trim and concrete gabled tops. Neighborhood donations paid for their construction.
