= Lake Chautauqua (Tippah County, Mississippi) =

- Location within Mississippi Location within the United States
- Location: Tippah County, Mississippi
- Coordinates: 34°45′55″N 89°02′28″W
- Type: reservoir
- Basin countries: United States
- Surface elevation: 469 ft (143 m)

Lake Chautauqua is a reservoir in the U.S. state of Mississippi.

The lake's name is a transfer from Chautauqua Lake, in New York.
