= Chautauqua (CDP), New York =

Chautauqua, New York
- Census-designated place
- Location within the state of New York
- Coordinates: 42°12′35″N 79°28′0″W
- Country: United States
- State: New York
- County: Chautauqua
- Town: Chautauqua

Area
  - Total: 0.43 sq mi (1.11 km^{2})
  - Land: 0.43 sq mi (1.11 km^{2})
  - Water: 0 sq mi (0.00 km^{2})
- Elevation: 1,350 ft (410 m)

Population (2020)
  - Total: 218
  - Density: 508.9/sq mi (196.49/km^{2})
- Time zone: UTC-5 (Eastern (EST))
  - Summer (DST): UTC-4 (EDT)
- ZIP code: 14722
- Area code: 716
- FIPS code: 36-14058
- GNIS feature ID: 0946459

Chautauqua is a hamlet and census-designated place (CDP) in the town of Chautauqua in Chautauqua County, New York, United States. It corresponds to the area of the Chautauqua Institution, a historic district, adult education center, and summer resort on the southwest shore of Chautauqua Lake in far western New York. The permanent residential population was 191 at the 2010 census.

== Geography ==
The CDP is bordered on the northeast by Chautauqua Lake and on the southwest by New York State Route 394, West Lake Road. Mayville, the primary settlement in the town of Chautauqua, is 4 miles (6 km) to the northwest, at the north end of the lake. Interstate 86 is 5.5 miles (8.9 km) to the southeast, at its crossing of the lake at Bemus Point.

According to the United States Census Bureau, the Chautauqua CDP has a total area of 0.42 square miles (1.1 km^{2}), all land.

== Demographics ==
Historical population
Census	Pop.	Note	%±
2010	191		—
2020	218		14.1%
U.S. Decennial Census
