= 1750 Arch Records =

American record label

- Founded: 1974
- Founder: Thomas Buckner
- Defunct: 1984
- Genre: experimental, avant garde, jazz, classical music.
- Country of origin: United States
- Location: Berkeley, California

1750 Arch Records was an independent record label that focused on experimental and avant garde music, jazz, and classical music.

== History ==
The label, named after the company's address in Berkeley, California, was founded in 1974 by vocalist Thomas Buckner, who was also responsible for starting 1750 Arch Concerts, which presented over a hundred concerts a year for eight years, and the Arch Ensemble, which performed and recorded music by 20th century composers. Over the course of roughly ten years, it released over fifty albums in a wide range of styles, including the complete player piano music of Conlon Nancarrow. In the early 1980s, 1750 Arch began to wind down its operations, closing in 1984, at which time the master recordings were returned to the composers and musicians. A number of albums were reissued on other labels, including Buckner's Mutable Music.

== Releases ==
Contemporary music

- S-1752 Various Artists: 10+2: 12 American Text Sound Pieces
- S-1760 Janet Millard: 20th Century Flute
- S-1765 Various Artists: New Music for Electronic and Recorded Media
- S-1768 Conlon Nancarrow: Complete Studies for Player Piano, Vol. #1
- S-1771 Joseph Bacon: Guitar Music of Villa-Lobos
- S-1772 Oakland Symphony Youth Orchestra: Lou Harrison: Elegiac Symphony; Robert Hughes: Cadences
- S-1774 David Rosenboom and Don Buchla: Collaboration in Performance
- S-1775 Stuart Dempster: In the Great Abbey of Clement VI
- S-1777 Conlon Nancarrow: Complete Studies for Player Piano, Vol. #2
- S-1779 Charles Amirkhanian: Lexical Music
- S-1780 Mel Graves: Three Worlds
- S-1781 Gardner Jencks: Selected Works for Piano, 1942-1980
- S-1782 Various Artists: The Music of Luigi Dallapiccola
- S-1784 John Adams: Shaker Loops; Phrygian Gates
- S-1785 Thomas Buckner, Gerald Oshita, Roscoe Mitchell: New Music for Woodwinds and Voice
- S-1786 Conlon Nancarrow: Complete Studies for Player Piano, Vol. #3
- S-1787 Susan Allen: New Music for Harp
- S-1789 Katrina Krimsky: Villa-Lobos: The Baby's Family
- S-1792 Oakland Symphony Youth Orchestra: Daniel Kobialka: Echoes of Secret Silence; Charles Shere: Nightmusic
- S-1793 Neil B. Rolnick: Solos
- S-1794 Peter Dickson Lopez: The Ship of Death
- S-1795 Henry Brant: Solar Moth; Daniel Kobialka: Autumn Beyond
- S-1797 Jon English, Candace Natvig: Triptych
- S-1798 Conlon Nancarrow: Complete Studies for Player Piano, Vol. #4
- S-1800 Michael McNabb: Computer Music
- S-1801 Anna Carol Dudley, Ronald Erickson, Earle Shenk: The Music of Charles Seeger (1886-1979)
- S-1806 Roscoe Mitchell, Gerald Oshita, Tom Buckner: Space: An Interesting Breakfast Conversation

Classical music

- S-1754 Martial Singher: Opus 70
- S-1761 Renee Grant-Williams, Dorothy Barnhouse, Alden Gilchrist: Brahms Duets
- S-1762 Jeanne Stark: Claude Debussy: Preludes, Book I
- S-1763 Jeanne Stark: Claude Debussy: Preludes, Book II
- S-1766 Martial Singher, Dorothy Angwin: An Album of French Songs
- S-1767 Bernhard Abramowitsch: Schubert: Sonata in B Flat Major; Klaviersuck II
- S-1783 San Francisco String Quartet: A Night in the Garden Court
- S-1796 Dennis Russell Davies, Charles Holland: My Lord What a Mornin'

Early music

- S-1751 Musica Mundana: Dufay: Fifteen Songs
- S-1753 Music for a While: Transformations: Dufay and His Contemporaries
- S-1756 Paul Hersh, Laurette Goldberg: J.S. Bach: The Leipzig Sonatas
- S-1757 Tom Buckner, Joseph Bacon: Wandering in This Place: Elizabethan Lute Songs
- S-1764 Joseph Bacon: Dowland: Fantasies and Dances for the Lute
- S-1773 Music for a While: La Fontaine Amoureuse: Poetry and Music of Guillaume de Machaut (1300-1377)
- S-1776 Anna Carol Dudley: Henry Purcell: Songs and Grounds

Jazz

- S-1755 Infinite Sound: Contemporary African-American Music
- S-1758 Denny Zeitlin with George Marsh and Mel Graves: Expansion
- S-1759 Denny Zeitlin, Ratzo B. Harris, George Marsh: Syzygy
- S-1769 Art Lande: The Eccentricities of Earl Dant
- S-1770 Denny Zeitlin: Soundings
- S-1778 Art Lande: The Story of Ba-Ku
- S-1790 Big Black (Danny Rey): Ethnic Fusion
- S-1791 George Marsh: Marshland
- S-1802 Randy Weston: Blue
- S-1804 George Marsh, John Abercrombie: Drum Strum
