= Polytempo =

The term polytempo or polytempic is used to describe music in which two or more tempi occur simultaneously.

In the Western world, the practice of polytempic music has its roots in the music theory of Henry Cowell, and the early practices of Charles Ives. Later on, composer Elliott Carter, in the fifties, began polymetric experiments in his string quartets that inevitably amounted to polytempic behavior by nature of several competing lines at different surface speeds. At around the same time, composer Henry Brant expanded on Ives's The Unanswered Question to create a spatial music in which entire ensembles, separated by vast distances, play in distinct simultaneous tempi.

Some types of African drumming exhibit this phenomenon.

Today's composers are employing polytempi as a compositional strategy to create total and complete independence of line in polyphonic music. Composers such as Conlon Nancarrow, David A. Jaffe, Evgeni Kostitsyn, Kyle Gann, Kenneth Jonsson, John Arrigo-Nelson, Brian Ferneyhough, Karlheinz Stockhausen, Frank Zappa, and Peter Thoegersen have used various methods in achieving polytempic effects in their music.

Polytempic music also harkens to the rhythmic practices of some Renaissance and medieval composers (see hemiola).

== Multitemporal music ==
Multitemporal music is composed using sound streams that have different internal tempi or pulse speed, for example one part at 115 bpm and at 105 bpm at the same time. This particular ratio between two tempos was proposed by Valerio Camporini Faggioni in a series of recordings and documented in 'Polimetri, Poliritmi and Multitemporal Music'. Multitemporal music was first heard in US-Mexican composer Conlon Nancarrow's work, discovered by Hungarian György Ligeti, who undertook the task of bringing Nancarrow's music to the fore.

To overcome the limits posed by a human performer in playing a multitemporal score Nancarrow used two modified player-pianos, punching the rolls by hand. One of the few recordings of this composer's work is found in Wergo's "Studies for Player Piano" series. The idea was then proposed by Iannis Xenakis in the early seventies and more recently by Italian born composer Valerio Camporini Faggioni using synthetic and software devices.

A similar technique, with the tempi similar to each other is rhythm phasing – a technique introduced by Steve Reich and used especially in minimalist and post-minimalist music.

== See also ==
- Polyrhythm and polymeter
- Tuplet for Zappa's and Ferneyhough's preferred notation for this concept.
- Rhythm phasing
