= Space Is the Place (disambiguation) =

Space Is the Place may refer to:

- Space Is the Place, Afrofuturist science fiction film
- Space Is the Place (soundtrack), an album by Sun Ra and His Intergalactic Solar Arkestra
- Space Is the Place (Sun Ra album), 1973
- Space Is the Place (Dahl/Andersen/Christensen album), 2012
- "Space Is the Place," a song by Spacehog from their album Resident Alien
- Song from Jonzun Crew's 1983 studio album Lost in Space.
