= Contiguglia =

Contiguglia is a surname. Notable people with the surname include:

- Robert Contiguglia (born 1941), American nephrologist and soccer executive
- Richard and John Contiguglia, classical piano duo
