= Circus Galop =

Song for player piano

Circus Galop is a galop in F major written for player pianos by Marc-André Hamelin. It was composed between the years 1991 and 1994 and is dedicated to Beatrix and Jürgen Hocker, piano roll makers. Its duration is approximately 4–5 minutes. Piano rolls of this piece are available from Wolfgang Heisig and Jürgen Hocker, who have recorded all three of Hamelin's player piano pieces on the MDG label, which were released in April 2008.

This piece is sometimes considered a precursor to Black MIDI, due to its complexity, rendering it impossible to play solo. Circus Galop oftentimes has upwards of 15 notes played at the same time, far too many for one person to play on a piano, with the notable exception of the central "balancing act" section in F-sharp minor. Human performances of the piece require multiple players responsible for different areas of the piano, creating an apparently seamless performance of the piece.
