= Neil Rolnick =

American classical composer

Neil Burton Rolnick (born October 22, 1947) is an American composer and educator living in New York City.

== Life ==
Rolnick was born in Dallas, Texas, and studied English literature at Harvard University where he received a BA in 1969. He then turned to music, studying composition first at the San Francisco Conservatory in 1973–74), then with Richard Felciano, and finally with Andrew Imbrie and Olly Wilson at the University of California, Berkeley, where he received an MA in 1976 and a PhD in 1980. Concurrently he also studied computer music with John Chowning at Stanford University and was a visiting researcher at IRCAM in Paris from 1977 to 1979 (Marshall 2001). Rolnick also studied composition with Darius Milhaud (Oteri and Rolmick 2013) and John Coolidge Adams, and computer music with James A. Moorer. He has lived in New York City since 2002.

== Teaching ==
From 1981 to 2013 Rolnick taught at the Rensselaer Polytechnic Institute, where he founded the iEAR Studios (Marshall 2001). In 1991, as head of Rensselaer's Arts Department he led the establishment of the nation's first MFA program in Integrated Electronic Arts.

== Musical production ==
Rolnick's compositions have appeared on 18 records and CDs, and he was a pioneer in the use of computers in performance. Much of Rolnick's musical output involves the use of computers and digital media, but it is generally notable for its accessibility and good humor. His music has been characterized by critics as "sophisticated" (Ken Smith, Gramophone), "hummable and engaging" (Steve Barnes, Albany (NY) Times Union), and as having "good senses of showmanship and humor" (Kyle Gann, The Village Voice).

== Discography ==
- Lockdown Fantasies (2023) (Other Minds Records OM-1035-2)
- Orchestra Underground: Tech & Techno (includes The iFiddle Concerto) (2014) (digital release by American Composers Orchestra)
- Neil Rolnick: Gardening At Gropius House (2013) (Innova Recordings 877)
- Neil Rolnick: Extended Family (2011) (Innova Recordings 782)
- The NYFA Collection: 25 Years of New York New Music (includes The Gathering from Extended Family) (2010) (Innova Recordings 233)
- Neil Rolnick: The Economic Engine (2009) (Innova Recordings 724)
- Neil Rolnick: Digits (2006) (Innova Recordings 656)
- Neil Rolnick: Shadow Quartet (2005) (Innova Recordings 631)
- Neil B. Rolnick's Fish Love That (2002) (Deep Listening Records DL 18-2002CD)
- Neil B. Rolnick: Requiem Songs: For the Victims of Nationalism (1996) (Albany Records Troy188)
- Transforms: The Nerve Event Project (includes NerveUs) (1993) (Cuneiform Records 55011)
- Neil B. Rolnick: Macedonian Air Drumming (1992) (Bridge Records BCD9030)
- Neil B. Rolnick: ElectriCity (1992) (OO Discs #8)
- CDCM Computer Music Series Vol. 11 (includes The Persistence of the Clave) (1992) (Centaur Records CDC2133)
- CDCM Computer Music Series Vol. 7 (includes Vocal Chords and A Robert Johnson Sampler) (1990) (Centaur Records CRC2047)
- Imaginary Landscapes (includes Balkanization) (1989) (Nonesuch Records 9 79235-2)
- CDCM Computer Music Series Vol. 2 (includes What Is the Use?) (1988) Centaur Records CRC2039)
- Neil B. Rolnick: Real Time/A La Mode (1987) (Composers Recordings, Inc. CRI SD 540)
- Neil B. Rolnick: Solos (1984) (1750 Arch Records S-1793)
