= Renee Grant-Williams =

American singer (1943–2021)

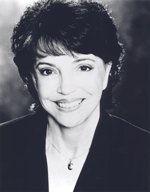

Background information
- Origin: Nashville, Tennessee United States
- Occupations: vocal coach, author, conductor, communication skills expert
- Formerly of: Miley Cyrus, Faith Hill, Tim McGraw, Christina Aguilera, Kenny Chesney, Bob Weir (Grateful Dead), Martina McBride, Keith Urban, Ben Folds, etc. For full list, see her website.
- Website: Myvoicecoach.com

Renee Grant-Williams (January 8, 1943 – November 11, 2021) was an American vocal coach living in Nashville, Tennessee, United States. She is also an active classical singer, conductor, communication skills expert, and published author. Grant-Williams was considered one of the most effective voice coaches in the business and has been a consultant to nearly every major record label. Her client roster includes Faith Hill, Tim McGraw, Miley Cyrus, Christina Aguilera, Kenny Chesney, Bob Weir (Grateful Dead), Martina McBride, Keith Urban, Dixie Chicks, Carrie Underwood, Linda Ronstadt, Carole Simons, and more.

== Biography ==
A full scholarship brought her a Bachelor of Music degree from the San Francisco Conservatory of Music. Additional studies include work at Carnegie-Mellon University (Pittsburgh, PA), the Music Academy of the West (Montecito, CA), the American Institute of Musical Studies (Graz, Austria), and the conducting and opera divisions of the Banff School of Fine Arts (Alberta, Canada).

Grant-Williams has held a variety of positions, including Director of the Division of Vocal Music at the University of California Berkeley, Music Director at the Actors Studio of New York City, adjunct voice faculty at the San Francisco Conservatory of Music, Artist-in-Residence with the San Mateo Chamber Music Society in California, co-founder of the new music ensemble KOTEKAN, and national sales director for the New York music production company David Horwitz Music.

Grant-Williams founded and conducted the San Francisco Community Chorus, as well as the recently formed Music City Community Chorus in Nashville, and directs the Excelsior Chamber Orchestra.

She draws upon a diverse musical background. She has been featured in several recordings, including a recording of Brahms Duets for 1750 Arch Records, KOTEKAN Percussion ensemble recordings for Reference Recordings, and a featured solo in the movie The Good Old Boys starring Sissy Spacek and Tommy Lee Jones. Although trained in opera, she sang lead for the Timms Brothers, a country band. She was cast as the lead in an Off-Broadway show produced by Dream Girls' creator, Tom Eyen, and was musical director and lyricist for a production at the Actors Studio. She was also the lyricist and music director for the original musical play Hillbilly Women based on the eponymous book by Kathy Kahn, and directed by Arthur Penn (Bonnie and Clyde, Little Big Man).

Grant-Williams' book Voice Power: Using Your Voice to Captivate, Persuade, and Command Attention has been published by AMACOM Books NY and endorsed by Paul Harvey, legendary ABC News radio commentator, as well as US Senator Fred Thompson. This book has been described as the "Dress For Success" equivalent for the speaking voice.

Voice Power was chosen by SoundView Executive Book Summaries as one of the best books of the year, as well as one of the top books of the decade.

A professional speaker herself, Grant-Williams provides coaching to business leaders, attorneys, public speakers, and politicians. A 10-year member of the National Speakers Association, she also presents communication skill training programs to associations and business organizations throughout the United States.

In addition to her communication skills book, Grant-Williams offers products that include a three-part DVD Vocal Master Class, a warm-up CD for singers, and a speech training CD Speaking with Emphasis and Conviction. She was also asked to create and teach a course for public speakers for Barnes & Noble's now defunct Online University.

She has been quoted or appeared in Business Week, The New York Times, The Tennessean, The Boston Globe, Chicago Tribune, San Francisco Chronicle, New York Post, Associated Press, UPI, TV Guide, US Weekly, Cosmopolitan, Elle, Southern Living, Singer Universe, Country Weekly, Pro Sound News, American Songwriter, MusicRow Magazine', and Mix Magazine. She is also a featured monthly writer for the national publication InTune Magazine. She has been seen on many broadcast outlets including ABC, CBS, NBC, Fox, Bravo, USA, MTV, CMT, GAC, BBC, PBS, and NPR.

Grant-Williams' skills were used in a recent Country Music Association, Closeup Magazine article, where she explained, "Emergency repairs are often what bring singers to me. But the goal is to keep accidents...from happening." She died from Parkinson's disease on November 11, 2021, at the age of 78.
