= Syndell Studio =

Former art gallery in Los Angeles, California

Coordinates: 34.053°N 118.467°W

Syndell Studio was an art gallery located in the Brentwood neighborhood of Los Angeles, California, between 1954 and 1956.

== History ==
Syndell Studio was founded in 1954 by Walter Hopps and Jim Newman, with Michael Scoles, poet Ben Bartosh and his wife Betty Brunt. It was located at 11756 Gorham Avenue, Brentwood, in a (no longer extant) building constructed from used pier pilings and remnants from a demolished Santa Monica beach club. According to oral history interviews with Hopps, Newman, and artist Edward Kienholz, the gallery was named after Maurice Sindel, a Midwestern farmer who died on the highway in Ohio on 6 June 1953. The accident was witnessed by Newman as he drove from Oberlin to Los Angeles. Hopps stated, "It's just too absurd, that this man dies in obscurity. We're going to make him an artist. We're going to create work for him. We're going to put him in group shows. We're going to name our place after him, as though it had been his studio".

Between 1955 and 1956, Shirley Neilsen Hopps was involved with the last years of the gallery.

The gallery's business cards were created by poet and printmaker Robert Alexander. Alexander and Wallace Berman designed invitations to exhibitions.

== Exhibitions ==
On 21 October 1956, Los Angeles Times art critic Jules Langsner wrote, "For a glimpse of avant-garde art in Los Angeles, the place to go is Syndell Studios".

Exhibitions held at Syndell Studio included:

- Children's Art from Southern California Nursery Schools, August–September 1955
- Edward Kienholz wooden constructions
- Arthur Richer paintings, 1956
- Sonia Gechtoff, 1956

In 1955 Syndell Studio co-organised with Gallery 6, San Francisco, the exhibition Action of abstract painting, which was held at the merry-go-round building on Santa Monica Pier. Syndell also co-organised the follow-up Action2 (Action Squared) exhibition, held in 1956 at Edward Kienholz's Now Gallery. In 1956, Syndell Studio was featured in the Los Angeles All-City Outdoor Art Festival at Barnsdall Park.
