= Ice Field =

Ice Field is a musical composition by Henry Brant, for large orchestral groups and organ, commissioned by Other Minds for a December 2001 premiere by the San Francisco Symphony. It was awarded the 2002 Pulitzer Prize for Music, and premiered on December 12 at Davies Symphony Hall in San Francisco. A, "'spatial narrative,'" or, "spatial organ concerto," and thus an example of Brant's use of spatialization, the work utilizes more than 100 players.

It was the strong feeling of the Jury that the Brant score was an extraordinarily powerful statement, the culmination of a life's work. His control of diverse instrumental groups in a spatial environment coalesces into powerful and coherent musical expression. Here, Brant, in his ninth decade, has refined his techniques of spatial music, embracing all of his experience to produce a remarkable vision, with increased vitality and creative imagination.

— The Pulitzer Prize Board

The piece was, "inspired by his experience, as a 12-year-old in 1926, of crossing the Atlantic by ship, which navigated carefully through a large field of icebergs in the North Atlantic."
