= Studies for Player Piano (Nancarrow) =

Group of compositions by Conlon Nancarrow

- by Conlon Nancarrow
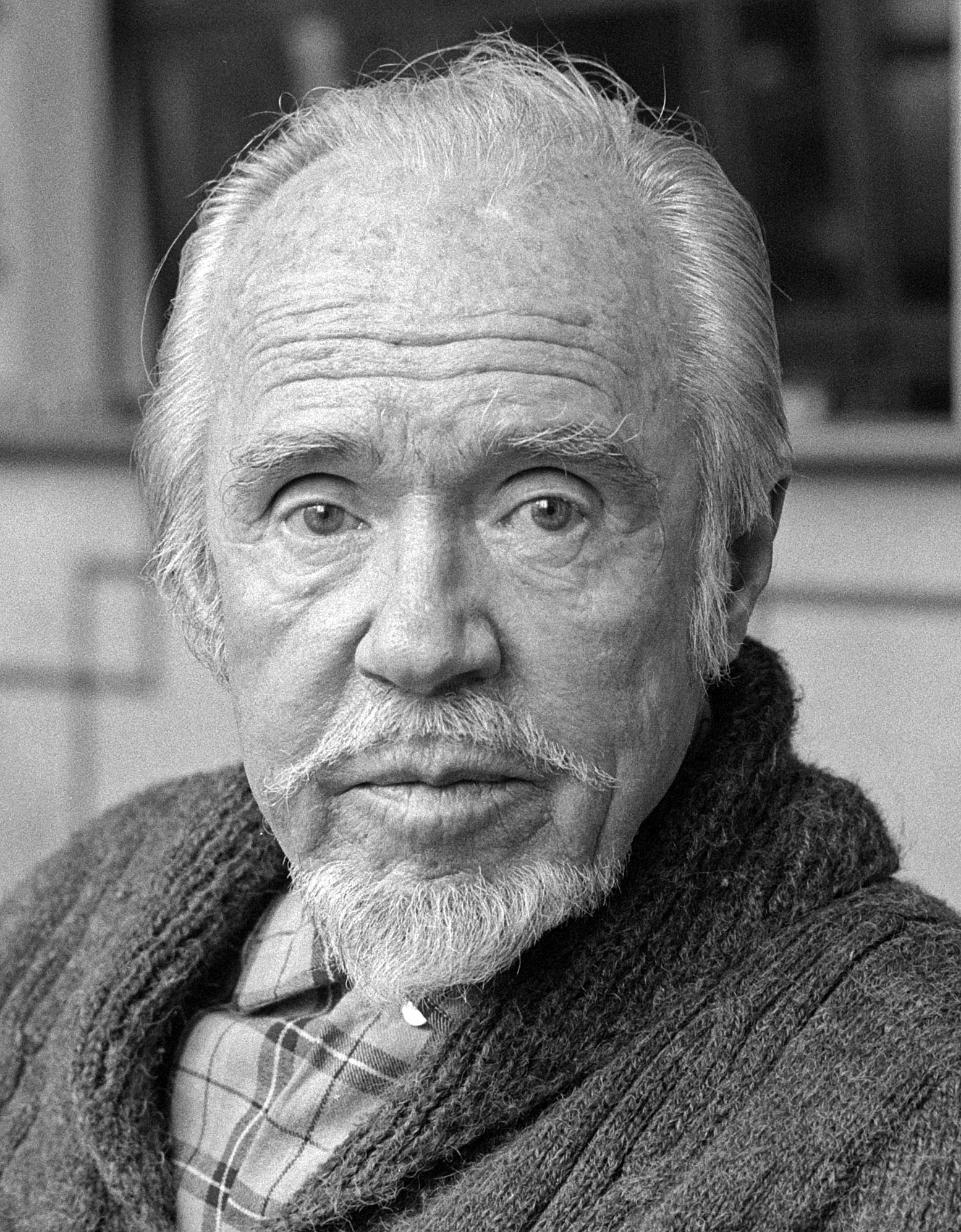
- Conlon Nancarrow
- Composed: 1948–1992
- Movements: 49
- Scoring: Player piano, sometimes computer-run player piano or two player pianos

The Studies for Player Piano is a series of 49 études for player piano by American composer Conlon Nancarrow. Often exploring complex rhythmic variations beyond the ability of a human pianist, these compositions are some of the best-known and celebrated compositions by Nancarrow, even though they are generally not considered a set of compositions, but rather individual compositions that were given the same title and status. The dates of composition are unknown, but approximate ranges have been given according to best evidence.

== Composition ==
Nancarrow's Studies for Player Piano were started when Nancarrow himself was first experimenting with the possibilities of the player piano. Most of these studies were never given a formal premiere and, given that Nancarrow lived his life in relative isolation, his studies became better known after the 80s. Furthermore, most of his studies were arranged for many different ensembles and instruments, including two pianos, small orchestra, string quartet, xylophone, vibraphone and celesta, synthesizers and computers.

=== 1948: Boogie-Woogie Suite ===
It is suspected that the Study No. 3 was Nancarrow's first composition for player piano composed between 1948 and 1949. This study was later compiled from the three initial parts into a five movement suite entitled Boogie-Woogie Suite in 1962. Its fourth movement included fragments of the second movement of Nancarrow's Suite for Orchestra, composed in 1945. It was arranged for piano, piano four-hands, chamber orchestra and small orchestra. This study was expanded and finished as Nancarrow's Piece for Ligeti, in an hommage to György Ligeti on 17 October 1988, at the Hamburgische Staatsoper. Of the two available versions of the third study, the Boogie-Woogie Suite remains the better known and more recorded one. A photocopy of the first version of the study is available at the Lincoln Center Library. The suite was first performed in Mexico City's Palacio de Bellas Artes on 30 July 1962.

The suite consists of five movements featuring different music styles. The first movement features a hasty boogie-woogie in which up to seven layers of melodic and rhythmic structures are superimposed. The second movement features a blues, with a twelve-bar ostinato in the bass line which is repeated ten times. The third movement also has a blues character with canonic passages. The fourth movement features a jazz style, whereas the fifth movement comes back to an even more rushed boogie-woogie.

=== 1949 to 1950 ===
The first study came right after, entitled Rhythm Study No. 1 for Player Piano and finished between 1949 and 1950. It was published in New Music Edition, a quarterly of modern composition, in Los Angeles in October 1951. The study has more than two hundred tempo changes. It was premiered together with Studies Nos. 1 and 2, in Mexico City's Palacio de Bellas Artes on 30 July 1962.

Front page of the Study No. 1. The word rhythm was dropped in the rest of the studies.

Nancarrow's Study No. 2 was composed circa 1950 and premiered together with Nos. 1 and 2. It is a slow blues with two melodic bass parts in tempo ratio of 3:5. However, Nancarrow also composed three additional version of the same study, entitled by himself Didactical Study No. 2x, Didactical Study No. 2y and Didactical Study No. 2z. These versions are also known as 2b, 2c and 2d, respectively, 2a being the main study. This way, 2x (2b) has a tempo ratio of 5:9, 2y (2c) has a tempo ratio of 4:7 and 2z (2d) has a tempo ratio of 5:7.

Some publishers and record companies use the title Study No. 2a in order to differentiate it from Nancarrow's Study No. 2A (sometimes also erroneously entitled Study No. 2b, as it would lead to confusion), an extended version of the fourth movement of his 1945 Suite for Orchestra. This extended version arranged for player piano was also composed in 1950 and was later included in the set decades later as an afterthought.

=== 1951 to 1960 ===
Between 1951 and 1965, Nancarrow wrote the studies nos. 4 to 30. Some of these compositions have been dated according to evidence, but Nancarrow never left a date in any of his originals. In these studies, Nancarrow explored the possibilities of polyrhythm, prolation canons and the usage of irrational numbers, such as the square root of two. However, he still used different musical styles, including jazz or blues.

The Study No. 4 is a study with jazzy melody lines which features canonlike elements. However, it is not a strict canon, as the rhythmic patterns are not followed. It was premiered in a performance at Ann Arbor, Michigan, at the ONCE Festival of New Music, on 18 February 1962. It was arranged for the ballet Crises, by Merce Cunningham and John Cage, and again for piano four-hands. The Study No. 5 was premiered in the same festival as the Study No. 4. It is a study of repeated and rapid runs and chordal motifs, superimposed over two ostinato rhythmic and melodic lines in the bass at tempos 5:7. It starts with only two voices but ends up with thirteen. It was also arranged for Crises and, later on, for chamber orchestra. The Study No. 6 has a rather bluesy style, with a tune on top of a quasi-ostinato bass line, which tempo ratios of 4:5:6, shifting back and forth every four notes along the whole movement. It was first performed in Kassel, in Summer 1982, and has since been arranged for a Marantz computer-piano, chamber orchestra, piano four-hands, two pianos and small orchestra. Amongst the arrangers is British composer Thomas Adès.

Of all of Nancarrow's early compositions for player piano, Study No. 7 is probably one of the longest. It takes 6 minutes to perform. According to American music scholar Kyle Gann, it is one of the few studies approaching the sonata form. One of the most complex early compositions, the study features striking rhythmic pattern together with melodic lines. The eight-part composition ends with racing arpeggios. It was originally presented with a longer beginning and a shorter ending. It was first performed together with the first three studies in Mexico City, on 30 July 1962 and has been arranged for a Marantz computer-piano, chamber orchestra, piano four-hands, two pianos and two disc-pianos.

The Study No. 8 is probably one of the most important early studies, because it features some of the most representative traits of Nancarrow's music: canons and continual tempo changes. These techniques were further developed along his musical career. The study is in three parts and is considered the first acceleration study. It was also the first time Nancarrow used bar lines and conventional notation. The first performance of the work was the one in 1962 in Mexico City. The following studies would continue to explore varied meters and tempos. Among them, the Study No. 9, which can be described as a collage with three repeating loops at different tempos. As his previous studies, the bass line is in ostinato and the ratios used in the study are 3:4:5. It was also premiered in the performance of the studies 7 and 8, in Mexico City and was arranged for chamber orchestra, piano four-hands and two pianos.

The last study to feature jazz characteristics is Study No. 10. It has a blues melody and complex rhythmic patterns, given the continually changing time signature. The first version of this study was in ABA form. However, in Nancarrow's circa-1980 revision of the study, the first section was dropped. This later revision is now considered authoritative. The Study No. 11 is an isorhythmic study which uses a technique from the 14th century motets. It uses conventional notation and features a sequence of repeating 120 chords. There are up to thirty tempo changes in the first page alone. The Study No. 12 is the first one to receive an unofficial subtitle: the flamenco study, because of its influence by Spanish flamenco. The study imitates the guitar arpeggios used in flamenco music. This study was arranged for chamber orchestra in 1995. These three studies were first performed at the Mexico City event in which most of his other studies to date were performed.

==== Seven Canonic Pieces ====
The studies 13 to 19 constitute a cycle of canons composed before 1960 entitled Siete piezas canónicas (Spanish: Seven Canonic Pieces). The whole cycle of canons was first performed in the Mexico City's Palacio de Bellas Artes, on 30 July 1962. All of these canons have at least one characteristic in common: the prolation of the different parts.

The Study No. 13 is the preliminary study for the whole set. Nancarrow became displeased with the result and decided to withdraw it and to never publish it. However, he made it available as a recording. The rest of the canons were published, starting with Study No. 14 which is a canon 4/5, in which the first part begins at a tempo of ♩ = 88, followed shortly thereafter by the second part, two octaves and a fifth higher at tempo ♩ = 110. The Study No. 15 is a canon 3/4, in which the two parts are three octaves apart and the faster meter alternates in a way that both parts begin and end simultaneously. The Study No. 16 explores deeper into the concept of two-part prolation canons. It is a sketch of a canon 3/5. There are two sections, the second 5/3 as fast as the first, and then the two are played simultaneously as a third section. The Study No. 17 is a three-part canon with ratios 12/15/20. The Study No. 18 is, again, a two-part canon with ratios 3/4. The second voice begins when the first has gone 1/3 of its way, but it is played 1/3 faster, so it catches up and finishes together with the first part. It is largely seen as a precursor of Study No. 40b. Finally, the Study No. 19 has the same tempo ratios than Study No. 17. It is a three-part canon with ratios 12/15/20, and its second and third part entries are set in a way that all three parts end up simultaneously.

=== 1961 to 1965 ===
Chronologically, the next composition to be finished was the Study No. 21, the canon X. It is an acceleration study where one voice progressively slows down while the other speeds up. The study starts with a bass line playing a 12-tone row at about 4 notes per second, immediately followed by the other voice, playing thirty-nine notes per second. Then the bass line starts to speed up and the treble line slows down progressively, reaching the same tempo halfway through the piece. The piece ends up with one of the lines playing 120 notes per second. It was presumably written in 1961 and was first performed in the Mexico City performance in 1962. The X alludes to the tempo acceleration and deceleration of both parts in the canon. It was also arranged for synthesizer, Marantz computer-piano, two disc-pianos and two voices. Following, Study No. 22, a canon with ratios of 1%/1½%/2¼%; this means that the lowest voice starts at a given tempo and accelerates 1% over time, the second voice does so at 1½% and the third voice at 2¼%. The three voices accelerate until the middle of the piece, where they decelerate at the same rate and get to the end of the piece at the same initial speeds. This canon was first performed in Kassel, Germany, in Summer 1982.

The Study No. 23 is a two-part composition which turns three-part halfway in the study. As in Study No. 21, Nancarrow also experimented with constant acceleration and deceleration changes. The treble accelerated part is considered to be "unplayable". The study was also first performed in Kassel in 1982. The Study No. 24 is a three-part canon 14/15/16 which, unlike other pieces by Nancarrow, is predominantly tonal. It features rapid repetitions, chains of trills and glissandi. It has been called a "masterpiece" by American scholar Kyle Gann. It was first performed on 30 May 1964, in Ojai, California. Study No. 25 is one of Nancarrow's most elaborate studies. It features many "idiomatic" traits of the player piano: glissandos, arpeggios, lightning-fast zagged patterns and rapid sequences. Its ending is a 12-second section in which 1028 notes are played with the sustain pedal held down, sometimes even getting to two hundred notes per second. However, even though it has canonic elements, it is mostly a rhapsodic piece. It was premiered at the Pro Musica Nova festival in Bremen, on 15 May 1976.

The Study No. 26 is actually the only study where all voices have no rhythmic differentiation. The canon is 1/1, which means that all the notes have the same tempo. It starts with one voice and ends up with seven. The study has been arranged for 7 hands on two to four pianos, piano four-hands, small orchestra and chamber ensemble. It was first performed at the Kassel event in 1982. In the Study No. 27, Nancarrow came back to the acceleration canons. This study is a canon 5%/6%/8%/11%/, and consists of an ostinato bass line at a constant speed, with up to eight voices accelerating and decelerating at different speeds. Nancarrow himself saw the study as "the ticking of an ontological clock (world clock) with events running along beside it at different speeds". This study was premiered at the Pro Musica Nova festival in Bremen, on 15 May 1976, just like Study No. 25.

The Study No. 28 is another one of those complex pieces by Nancarrow. It is one of the few pieces which have actual rules and correlations between tempo and pitch. To serve as a guide for listeners, Nancarrow also added chords at regular intervals to provide a temporal orientation. It was first performed in the National Autonomous University of Mexico, in Mexico City, on 23 October 1990. The Study No. 29 is the first piece in which Nancarrow tried to work on a prepared piano, in the style of John Cage. However, Nancarrow dismissed the idea of putting preparations in a piano for this study. It has up to eight parts and resembles the ticking of clocks at different speeds. The study is in ABABABABABABAB form with different acceleration ratios interacting with each other. Nancarrow never liked the piece and was initially willing to withdraw it. He commented: "I should have thrown it away a long time ago, but I never had the heart." The study was first performed in Köln, on 15 October 1988.

Finally, the Study No. 20 was among the last studies from this period to be composed. With this study, Nancarrow started to use characteristics in notation other than the traditional ones. Sometimes unofficially subtitled Cloud, it features a style that is very closely related to that of Iannis Xenakis and György Ligeti. This study is a study on note durations, with eight voices being very close together. It was presumably composed around 1965, and is strikingly similar to Ligeti's Monument for two pianos, written in 1976. This study was first performed in Aptos, California, on 27 August 1977 and has been arranged for two pianos and for piano four-hands. The last study from 1965 is Study No. 30, which was rejected by the composer for him having problems with the preparations, because the preparations did not stay with the strings of an upright piano. After this study, Nancarrow decided to go back to the unprepared piano. Nancarrow recorded the piece, but never published the score and discarded it, for he was not pleased with the result. This study was first performed in public in the same even as Study No. 28, in the National Autonomous University of Mexico, in Mexico City, on 23 October 1990.

=== 1966 to 1969 ===
The Study No. 31 is a canon 21/24/25. It has three differentiated parts, called "movements" by Kyle Gann, which follow a sequence of "fast-slow-fast". However, these movements are not marked in any way in the original score. This study was arranged for string quartet in 2003. The Study No. 32 is a canon 5/6/7/8, in which all the different voices are not assigned a particular speed for the whole movement, but rather each voice is played at different speeds. This study was arranged for piano four-hands and chamber ensemble. From Study No. 33 on, Nancarrow became more and more fascinated by irrational tempos. This is a canon √2/2, which means that the different layers have no common denominator. As in the previous study, the different speeds are alternated between the parts of the composition. Considered one of the most important studies by Nancarrow himself, this study was completed circa 1968 and was arranged for string quartet in 2003. All of these three studies were given a first performance at the Kassel event, in Summer 1982.

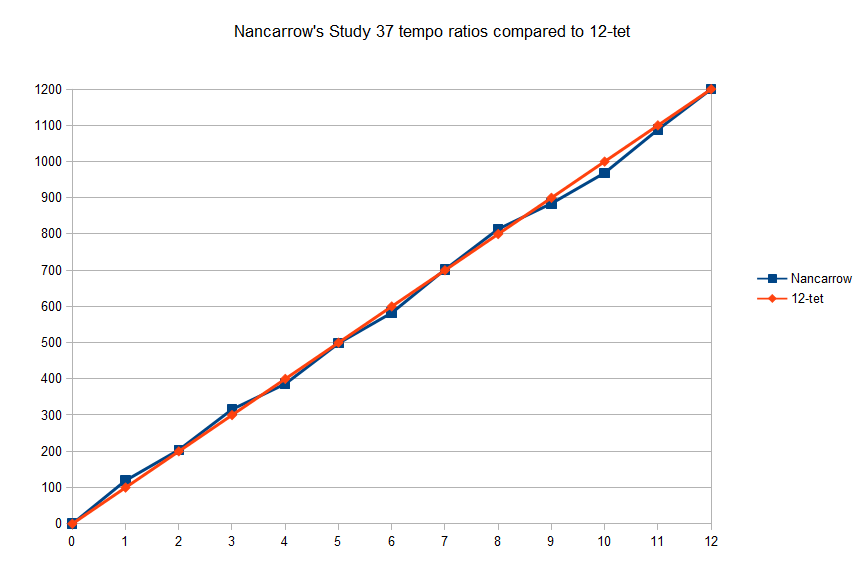
Nancarrow's tempo ratios compared to 12-tet frequency ratios

The longest and most important study by Nancarrow, Study No. 37 was initially conceived in 1965 and was finished in 1969. It takes up to 10 minutes to perform. It is a complex canon 150/160 5/7/168 3/4/180/187 1/2/200/210/225/240/250/262 1/2/281 1/4, that is, a twelve-part canon. These twelve different speeds correspond to the ratios of the vibrations in the notes of a 7-limit just chromatic scale. It was first performed in Graz on 31 October 1982 and has since been arranged at least four times: for twelve synthesizers, for computer, xylophone and vibraphone, for computer and xylophone installation and for 12 spatially distributed stereo channels.

The other three studies were begun between 1966 and 1969, but were completed between 1969 and 1976. The Study No. 34, which was completed circa 1969, is a canon $\tfrac{9}{4/5/6}$/$\tfrac{10}{4/5/6}$/$\tfrac{11}{4/5/6}$. This means that it is a 9/10/11; however, each part is also subdivided into 4/5/6. It was premiered in Mexico City on 23 October 1990 and was arranged for string trio in 2004. The Study No. 36 is a canon 17/18/19/20 in which all of its four voices have exactly the same score with different fixed speeds: its first voice plays at tempo 85, its second at 90, its third at 95 and its fourth at 100. The four parts meet in the middle of the composition. Therefore, the fourth voice ends first, then the third, then the second and, finally, the first. It was finished in 1970. Finally, the Study No. 35 is a comeback by Nancarrow to a rather jazzy style. It was finished between 1975 and 1978, even though it was performed before it was finished. These two studies were first performed in the Bremen event, on 15 May 1976.

=== 1970 to 1982 ===
Front page of the Study No. 41. Here, Nancarrow gives broad indications regarding how 41c must be played.

From here, Nancarrow started to work on other creative ways to develop his compositions. The Study No. 40 is a study for two player pianos. It is divided into two parts: 40a and 40b. The study a is a canon ^{e}/_{π} for only one player piano, which makes a profuse use of glissandi. The study b, however, is a canon $\tfrac{^e/_\pi}{^e/_\pi}$, for two synchronized player pianos. This means that the two pianos play the same score, but the second piano starts approximately 20 seconds away from the first, but a bit faster, in a way that both pianos end up simultaneously. It has been unofficially subtitled Transcendental, after transcendental numbers. It was completed in 1975 and was first performed in the Pro Musica Nova event, in 1976. The Study No. 41, again for two player pianos, is divided into three parts: 41a, 41b and 41c. The first canon is $\tfrac{1}{\sqrt\pi}/\sqrt{^2/_3}$ for the first piano, the second canon is $\tfrac{1}{3\sqrt\pi}/\sqrt[3]{^{13}/_{16}}$ for the second piano, and the third is $\tfrac{\tfrac{1}{3\sqrt\pi}/\sqrt[3]{^{13}/_{16}}}{\tfrac{1}{\sqrt\pi}/\sqrt{^{2}/_{3}}}$ for both pianos, in the proportions marked in the first page of the score. A complete version of the piece was first performed at Kassel in Summer 1982.

From now on, Nancarrow started to fulfill commissions. This is the case of the Study No. 42, commissioned by Betty Freeman. It is a study with ten different tempos, in which 12/8/9/10/7 predominate. It was first performed in Los Angeles, on 2 November 1981. The Study No. 43, which was initially entitled Study No. 38, was commissioned by Sterischer Herbst, for the ISCM World Music Days in Graz, on 31 October 1982, where it was indeed first performed. The study is a simple two-part canon 24/25 and was completed in 1975. The Study No. 44 was again commissioned by Betty Freeman. It is unofficially subtitled Aleatoric Canon or Aleatoric Round, given that it is a composition for two player pianos, but the voices in the canon can be played at any tempo relationship. It was completed in 1981 and first premiered on 6 December 1982, in Los Angeles.

==== Betty Freeman Suite (or Second Boogie-Woogie Suite) ====
The last commission from Betty Freeman was the Study No. 45, sometimes also called Betty Freeman Suite or, unofficially, the Second Boogie-Woogie Suite, in allusion to the Study No. 3. It was initially thought to be a five-movement suite, which would take up to 20 minutes to perform. However, Nancarrow thought it was too long and decided to discard three of the five movements and write another one. The final composition is a three-movement composition: 45a, 45b and 45c. All of them were composed between 1982 and 1983, and were first premiered on 30 January 1984, in Los Angeles, even though the shortened version was finished in 1986. The first movement is a boogie-woogie which what Nancarrow called a "spastic rhythm". The second movement is a complicated canon of 3/4/5/7 with bluesy styles. In the third movement, Nancarrow uses a technique first known to have been used by Henry Cowell, in which the piano makes a very fast glissando only sustaining a few notes of a chord. Two of the other three discarded parts were finished and assigned the numbers 46 and 47. An abandoned part of the study, later entitled 45d or Discard, is now under the protection of the Paul Sacher Stiftung.

=== 1983 to 1992 ===
The Study No. 46 is the first part of the discarded version of the Betty Freeman Suite. It is a complex study with tempo ratios 3/4/6, finished between 1984 and 1987. It was first performed in Boulogne-Billancourt, on 21 October 1991. The Study No. 47 is, in turn, a Canon 5/7 and the discarded finale from the Betty Freeman Suite, which was first performed as an individual study on 14 June 1997. The Study No. 48 is actually the Study No. 39, only it was given a new title to fulfill a commission by the European Broadcasting Union. It is a complex canon 60/61 for two player pianos, divided into three sections, one for each piano and the final one for the two of them playing simultaneously. The final two-piano version was finished between 1975 and 1977 and was premiered on 17 October 1997, in Donaueschingen.

The Study No. 49 was first conceived as a three-movement suite composed by Nancarrow for the application for the Grawemeyer Grant. It was composed in 1987. The tempo ratios for the three movements of this composition (49a, 49b and 49c) are relatively simple, which is why Nancarrow first planned to arrange it into a Concerto for Pianola and Orchestra planned for Rex Lawson, but he never realized it. The whole suite as a jazz influence, and the structure falls into the scheme of "fast-slow-fast". The three canons in the suite are 4/5/6.

Finally, the Study No. 50 is a canon 5/7 which introduces a third voice later into the piece. It is a transcription for player piano of the second movement of the Piece for Small Orchestra No. 2, completed between 1987 and 1988. The final study was jokingly entitled Study No. 3750 by Nancarrow, but is now known as the Study No. 51. It is a pseudo-canon with tempos 12/16/20, punctured by Carlos Sandoval.

=== Other related compositions ===
Nancarrow also created other similar compositions for player piano, including Para Yoko (Spanish: For Yoko), a pseudo-canon 4/5/6 dedicated to his wife, For Ligeti, dedicated to György Ligeti on his 65th birthday, and Contraption No. 1, a composition for Trimpin's IPP, "Instant Prepared Piano". Among Nancarrow's papers, up to five abandoned studies were found, all being reductions of other works for ensemble or orchestra.

== Structure ==
The whole list of studies were not numbered in chronological order. All the studies were initially titled Rhythm Study. However, after Study No. 35, Nancarrow decided to drop the word "Rhythm" in the titles. Nevertheless, the first study was published with the original title. Studies 38 and 39 were later numbered as 43 and 48 in order to fulfill commissions. The list of studies is as follows:

- Study No. 1 (published as Rhythm Study No. 1)
- Study No. 2 (also entitled Study No. 2a. There are three more versions: 2x, 2y and 2z. Not to be confused with Study No. 2A, an additional arrangement of a movement from Nancarrow's Suite for Orchestra, generally not included in the set)
- Boogie-Woogie Suite
  - Study No. 3a
  - Study No. 3b
  - Study No. 3c
  - Study No. 3d
  - Study No. 3e
- Study No. 4
- Study No. 5
- Study No. 6
- Study No. 7
- Study No. 8
- Study No. 9
- Study No. 10
- Study No. 11
- Study No. 12 (unofficially subtitled Spanish)
- Seven Canonic Pieces
  - Study No. 13
  - Study No. 14 (Canon 4/5)
  - Study No. 15 (Canon 3/4)
  - Study No. 16 (Canon 3/5)
  - Study No. 17 (Canon 12/15/20)
  - Study No. 18 (Canon 3/4)
  - Study No. 19 (Canon 12/15/20)
- Study No. 20
- Study No. 21 (Canon X)
- Study No. 22 (Canon 1%/1.5%/2.25%)
- Study No. 23
- Study No. 24 (Canon 14/15/16)
- Study No. 25
- Study No. 26 (Canon 1/1)
- Study No. 27 (Canon 5%/6%/8%/11%/)
- Study No. 28
- Study No. 29
- Study No. 30 (for prepared player piano)
- Study No. 31 (Canon 21/24/25)
- Study No. 32 (Canon 5/6/7/8)
- Study No. 33 (Canon √2/2)
- Study No. 34 (Canon $\tfrac{9}{4/5/6}$/$\tfrac{10}{4/5/6}$/$\tfrac{11}{4/5/6}$)
- Study No. 35
- Study No. 36 (Canon 17/18/19/20)
- Study No. 37 (Canon 150/160 5/7/168 3/4/180/187 1/2/200/210/225/240/250/262 1/2/281 1/4)
- Study No. 40
  - Study No 40a (Canon ^{e}/_{π})
  - Study No 40b (Canon $\tfrac{^e/_\pi}{^e/_\pi}$)
- Study No. 41 (Canon $\tfrac{\tfrac{1}{3\sqrt\pi}/\sqrt[3]{^{13}/_{16}}}{\tfrac{1}{\sqrt\pi}/\sqrt{^{2}/_{3}}}$)
  - Study No. 41a (Canon $\tfrac{1}{\sqrt\pi}/\sqrt{^2/_3}$)
  - Study No. 41b (Canon $\tfrac{1}{3\sqrt\pi}/\sqrt[3]{^{13}/_{16}}$)
  - Study No. 41c (A and B together in approximately the proportions indicated in the score)
- Study No. 42
- Study No. 43 (Canon 24/25)
- Study No. 44 (also unofficially subtitled Aleatory Canon)
- Study No. 45 (Second Boogie-Woogie Suite)
  - Study No. 45a
  - Study No. 45b
  - Study No. 45c
- Study No. 46
- Study No. 47
- Study No. 48 (Canon 60/61)
- Study No. 49
- Study No. 50 (Canon 5/7, arrangement for player piano of the second movement of the Piece for Small Orchestra No. 2)
- Study No. 51 (Pseudo-canon 12/15/20, entitled Study No. 3750 by the composer)
