= Richard and John Contiguglia =

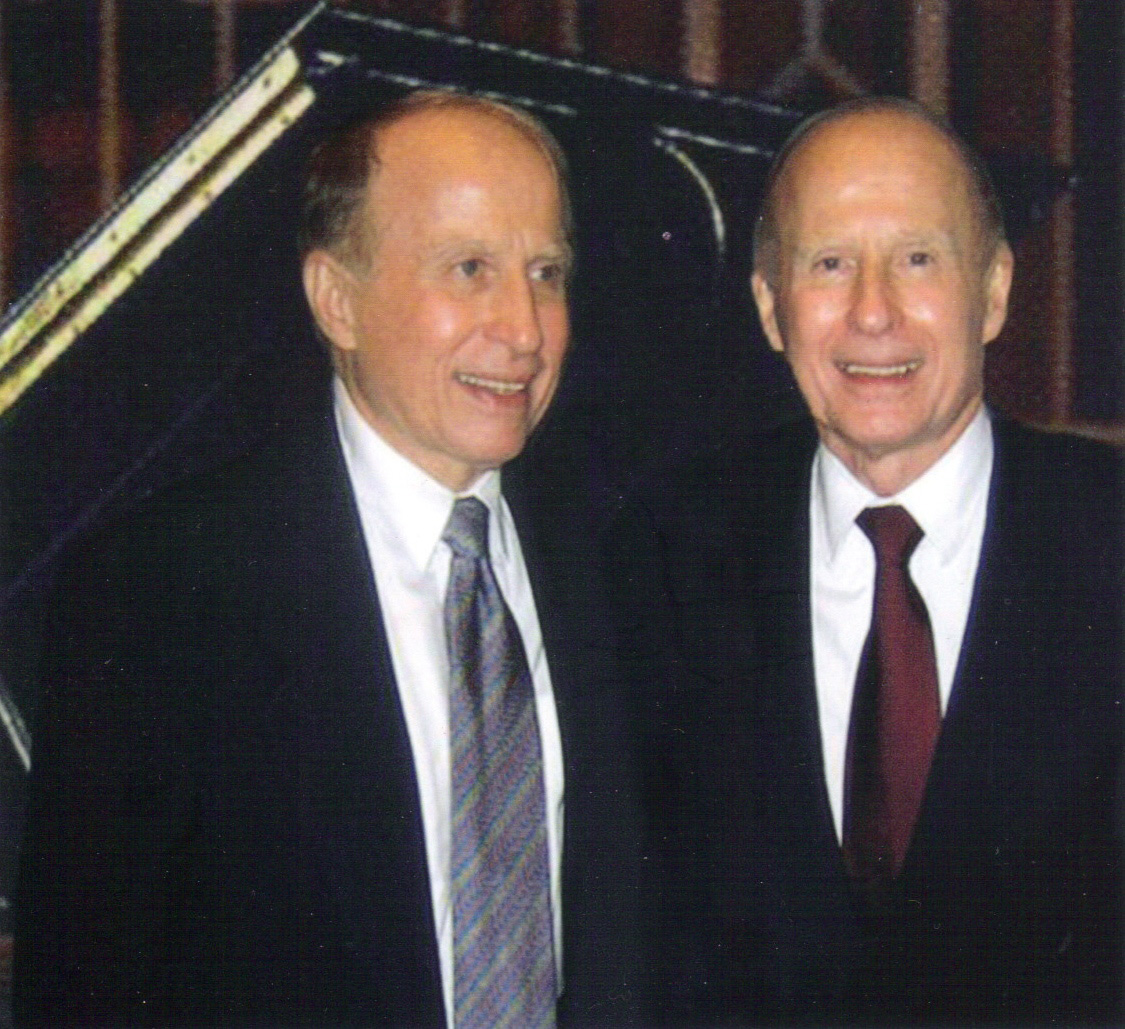
- Richard and John Contiguglia at the National Gallery in London, November 2008

Background information
- Born: Richard and John Contiguglia; April 13, 1937 (age 89); Auburn, New York
- Genres: Classical
- Occupations: Musicians; Authors
- Instrument: Piano
- Years active: 1962–2015
- Labels: Connoisseur Society; CRI; Helicon Records; MCA Classics; Gemini CD Classics
- Website: duopianistscontiguglia.com

Richard and John Contiguglia were American identical twin duo-pianists. They were born on April 13, 1937, Auburn, New York, and frequently performed together before John's death on March 18, 2025.

== Biography ==
Richard and John Contiguglia were born on April 13, 1937, to Italian immigrant parents, the second set of twins and the youngest of seven children. At the age of five, they started piano lessons and at six, gave their first public performance together.

At the age of twelve, they performed a group of two-piano pieces on a recital in their hometown by the composer-pianist Percy Grainger. Grainger was so impressed with the twins' talent that a few months later he sent them much of his four-hand music, which they championed throughout their career.

Their first important teacher was Jean Wilder, a pupil of Tobias Matthay, then on the faculty of Wells College in Aurora, New York.

After graduating first and second in their class from public high school in Auburn, the twins attended Yale College. They were elected to Phi Beta Kappa in their junior year, an honor extended to the top 1% of their class of 1000, and received BA degrees in 1959, summa cum laude, with philosophical orations, and were awarded the Seymour Prize for the highest numerical average of a graduating student in Berkeley College, their residential college. They achieved identical 4-year averages of 91, a coincidence that received national attention.

In 1961, they received MMus degrees from the Yale Graduate School of Music. During their 6 years at Yale, the twins studied piano with Bruce Simonds.

From 1961 to 1965, Richard and John studied in London with the English pianist, Dame Myra Hess, who prepared them for their professional debut in London's Wigmore Hall on October 27, 1962. Its success led to recitals on the Continent, especially in the Netherlands, where they received enthusiastic critical acclaim, and to a contract to tour in the United States under the aegis of impresario Sol Hurok.

Richard and John taught piano for six years at Syracuse University School of Music from 1966 to 1972. They also taught for 6 years at the Horace Mann School in New York.

Since 1974, Richard and John have made their homes in New York City. John died on March 18, 2025.

== Bartok and Liszt recordings ==
Excerpt from Liszt's 1850 transcription of Beethoven's Ninth Symphony, 1st Movement, for two pianos, four hands. Performed by Richard and John Contiguglia, August 1972.

Excerpt from Liszt's 1850 transcription of Beethoven's Ninth Symphony, 2nd Movement.

Excerpt from Liszt's 1850 transcription of Beethoven's Ninth Symphony, 4th Movement.

During the 1970s, the Contiguglias recorded and performed much little-known repertoire of Bartók and Liszt. Connoisseur Society Records released Bartók's Suite, Op. 4b and 14 Pieces from Mikrokosmos in 1970.

"A good deal of the impact of this music must, I think, be attributed to the way the Contiguglia brothers play it. Frankly, they are an amazing duo, possessed of extraordinarily magnificent pianism, precise ensemble, an acute sense of rhythm and timing, and a fullness of tone which is quite glorious in the Suite." (Ates Orga, Records and Recording, Feb. 1975)

It was followed in 1971 by Liszt's two-piano and piano, four-hand versions of 4 Operatic Transcriptions (Réminiscenses de Mozart's 'Don Juan', Réminiscences de Bellini's Norma, Réminiscences de Bellini's 'La Sonnambula', and the Tscherkessenmarsch from Glinka's 'Russlan und Ludmila').

"If somewhere in the world, there were a music lover about 130, he might – were he very fortunate – have heard these works played by Liszt and Tausig. Asked to describe the manner in which these two great and legendary virtuosos played, it would not be surprising were he to put this record on his turntable and say, 'They played like that.'" (Keith Fagan, The Liszt Society, Limited)

Finally, in 1972, Connoisseur Society released their performance of Liszt's monumental transcription for two pianos of Beethoven's 9th Symphony, coupled with his transcription for one piano, four-hands of his 1845 Festkantate for Orchestra, Soloists and Chorus.

"Here is the all-around finest two-piano recording I have ever heard, bar none." (Edward Tatnall Canby, Audio Magazine)

Honors poured in. In 1975, The Liszt Society of Budapest, Hungary awarded them a Grand Prix in the first record competition in the Society's history for the "Liszt-Beethoven 9th". Gramophone magazine selected two of the Liszt releases as its choices for Top 10 Record Releases of the Year. The Beethoven-Liszt "9th" was a Billboard Best Seller and a best seller in Japan.

All of the performances on these Bartók and Liszt discs were first recorded performances.

== Other notable recordings ==
- Schubert-Brahms Connoisseur Society recording: Schubert's Fantasy in F minor and Marche Militaire, Brahms's Waltzes, Op. 39 and Hungarian Dances, Nos. 5 & 6
- John Corigliano's Kaleidoscope and Gazebo Dances, on the CRI label, recorded at the composer's request.
- Two-piano Music of Percy Grainger and William Bolcom for Helicon Records: Lincolnshire Posy, Hill Song No. 1, Children's March (Over the Hills and Far Away, all by Grainger, and Recuerdos and Two Rags: The Serpent's Kiss and Through Eden's Gates by Bolcom.
- Gershwin-Grainger CD and LP for MCA Classics: "The Legendary Transcriptions of Percy Grainger: Fantasy on George Gershwin's 'Porgy and Bess', the solo-piano transcriptions of Gershwin's Love Walked In and The Man I Love, the piano 4-hand version of Embraceable You and the original Gershwin duos of Rhapsody in Blue and Cuban Overture.
- In 1982, Grainger's centennial year, Richard and John recorded for NPR several programs of Grainger's chamber music, including the Trios for piano, violin and cello, My Robin is to the Greenwood Gone and Colonial Song, as well as other works for strings and piano, besides many compositions for two pianists. The previous year they presented an all-Grainger program at The Caramoor Festival.

== Gemini CD Classics ==
In 2000 The Contiguglias formed their own recording company, Gemini CD Classics, LLC. Under this label they issued five CDs: Schubert Duets - The Final Year; Live From the Holland Liszt Festival; Beethoven/Liszt '9th Symphony'; Gershwin-Grainger; and Liszt (Operatic Fantasies) and Bartok Suite, Op. 4b. The Contiguglias were awarded a second Grand Prix by the Liszt Society of Budapest for the last recording.

== Performances of note ==
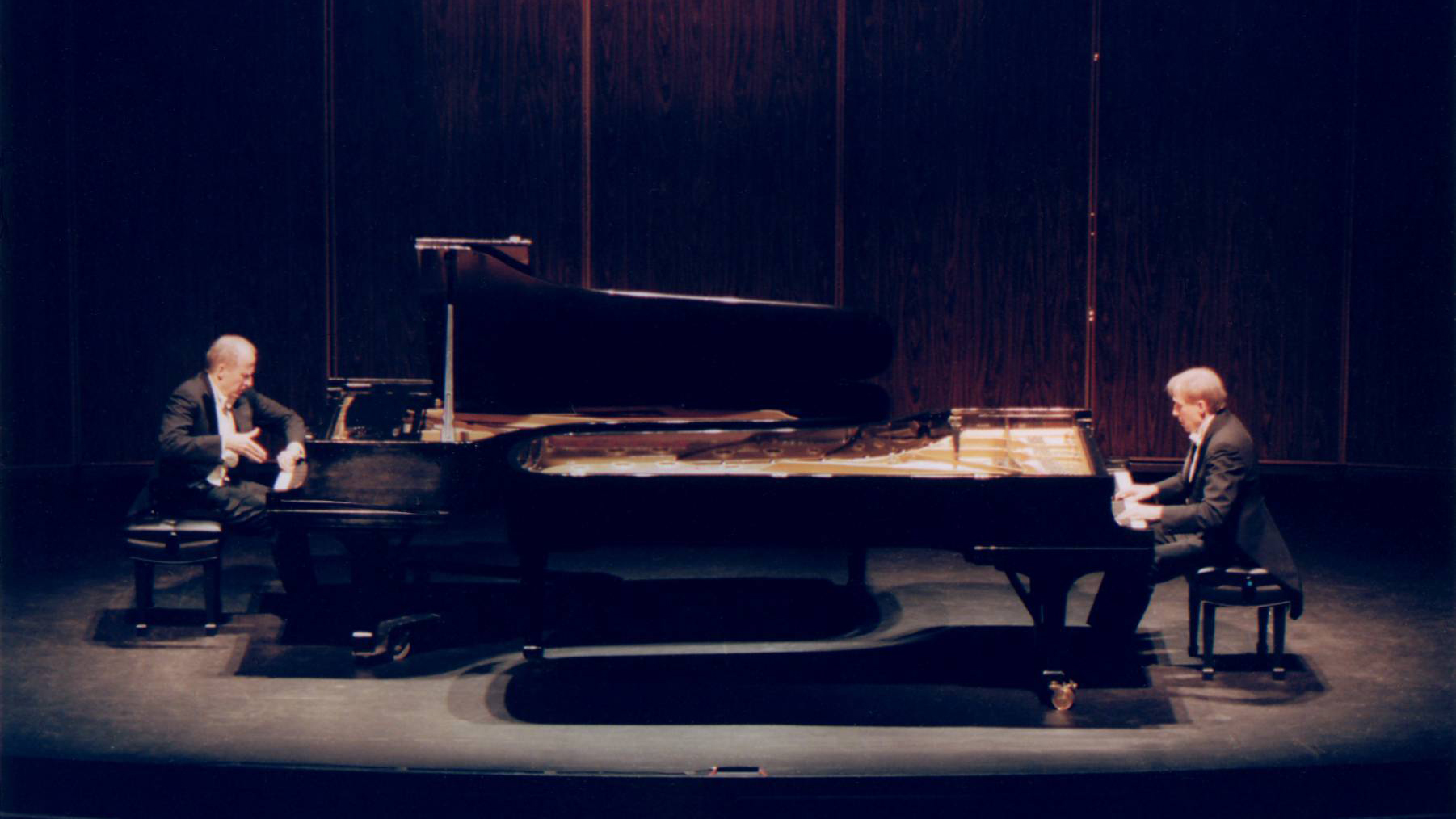
John and Richard Contiguglia performing at the Lobero Theater, Santa Barbara, California, 2000.

Performances of Bartók and Liszt works by the Contiguglias, many of which were modern-day premieres, were presented in London's Queen Elizabeth Hall in 1971 and 1972, one of which featured Bartók's complete works for two pianos. In 1970 they participated in Bartók commemorative concerts in Amsterdam and Rotterdam, organized by Bartók pupil and composer, Geza Frid. They performed a Liszt Marathon Recital in New York's Carnegie Hall in 1974. They were frequent guests of the Holland Liszt Festivals in Utrecht and Amsterdam during the 1980s.

On November 14, 1986, in Utrecht, Netherlands, under the auspices of the Holland Liszt Festival, they gave the first complete public performance ever of Liszt's unpublished, and almost forgotten, Grosses Konzertstück über Mendelssohn's 'Lieder ohne Worter' after reconstructing the music from manuscript copies. At what was to have been the Konzertstück's debut in Paris by Liszt and a pupil in 1835, Liszt collapsed at the piano in the middle of the performance and was carried off the stage. Many years later, Busoni announced an upcoming performance in London with a colleague, Egon Petri, but died before the concert could take place. There is no record of this work being publicly performed before the Contiguglias' world premiere in Holland in 1986. Its American premieres followed in Chicago and New York the following weeks.

Richard and John appeared with many orchestras in Europe and North and Central America, often playing unusual repertoire. They were soloists with the Cleveland Orchestra in a 1978 revival of Victor Babin's Concerto for Two Pianos and Orchestra; with the Syracuse Symphony in Tibor Serly's Double Concerto; with the Honolulu Symphony in Quincy Porter's Concerto Concertante for 2 Pianos and Orchestra; with the American Symphony Orchestra in New York's Carnegie Hall, in Max Bruch's Concerto for Two Pianos and Orchestra; with the Des Moines Symphony and with the Seattle Symphony in the orchestrated version, commissioned by the Contiguglias from Tom Kochan, of Percy Grainger's Fantasy on George Gershwin's 'Porgy and Bess'. Other orchestras with which they have collaborated include the Boston Pops under Arthur Fiedler, the Toronto Symphony, the National Symphony, the Atlanta Symphony, the Pittsburgh Symphony, the Baltimore Symphony, the Colorado Symphony, the Phoenix Symphony, the Netherlands Chamber Orchestra, the Amsterdam Philharmonic, the Rotterdam Philharmonic, and the Nordelich Philharmonic Orkest of Groningen, Netherlands.

Their interest in 'new' music was not limited to works by modern composers. On March 21, 1993, Richard and John were an important part of the annual Schubertiade, Schubert and the Piano, at the 92nd St. Y in New York, during which they focused on Schubert's Piano Duets, described by the Schubertiade's program director, Joseph Horowitz, as "arguably, the most comprehensively varied body of music ever created by a single composer in a single genre," works which are "rarely performed, or recorded." After their extensive illustrated traversal, the twins gave complete performances of the three masterpieces from 1828, Schubert's final year, Allegro (Lebensstürme), Fantasy in F minor and Grand Rondo in A major. Schubert duets were an important part of their recital repertoire throughout their career.

Perhaps the most important concert in their final years of concertizing was their performance at the National Gallery in London for Myra Hess Day in 2008. The day honored the great pianist and national hero, and the Contiguglias' beloved teacher. Their program comprised Howard Ferguson's Partita for Two Pianos, Schubert's Variations in A-flat on an Original Theme and the Finale of the Beethoven-Liszt 9th Symphony. Ferguson had worked closely with Dame Myra on the wartime National Gallery Concerts; Richard and John studied the Schubert Variations with Dame Myra in preparation for their London debut recital.

As part of their early touring, the Contiguglias often visited nursing homes and hospitals to share their music. Under the auspices of Hospital Audiences. Inc., they teamed up with Glenn Close and Jeremy Irons in a performance of Saint-Saens' Carnival of the Animals, with the famous actors reciting the Ogden Nash poems. The performance was recorded and videotaped by Video Artists International.

== Publications ==
- Hunting for Liszt Treasure - Music Journal, vol. xxxiii, No. 2, Feb. 1975.
- Grainger The Modernist - A Review - NABMSA Reviews, Vol. 2, No. 2 (Autumn 2015).
- Some Thoughts on the Performance of a Schubert Duet - Keyboard Classics/Piano Stylist, March/April 1993, P. 54 ff, Vol. 13/ No. 2.
- Duo Pianists as Chamber Musicians - Chamber Music, April 1997, Vol. 14, No. 2, P.16ff.

== Adams Piano Recital Series ==
The Adams Foundation Piano Recital Series, formed in 2001, arranged piano recitals by American pianists throughout the United States under the sponsorship of the Adams Family Foundation. During the thirteen years of its operation the program made possible 261 piano recitals in 40 different communities in 25 different states by 18 different American pianists. When the end of the program was announced, Richard and John received tributes from many of the pianists who participated, including Simone Dinnerstein, Jon Nakamatsu, Joseph Kalichstein, Steven Mayer, Ursula Oppens, Soyeon Kate Lee, Frederic Chiu, Ann Schein and Jeanne Stark-Iochmans.

== Sources ==
- Contiguglia website: Home
- Contiguglia website: Biography
- Contiguglia website: Repertoire
