= Black MIDI =

Experimental music genre

- Stylistic origins: MIDI technology; player piano enthusiasts; experimental music by Frank Zappa
- Cultural origins: Late 2000s – early 2010s, Japan (arguably)

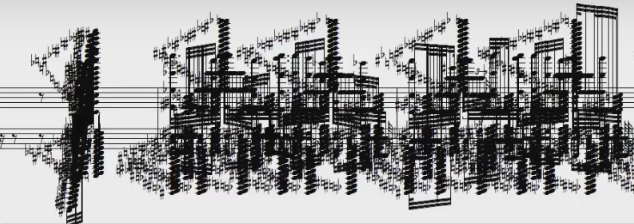
A section of Black MIDI music. Large numbers of notes are layered in proximity to one another, meaning that a traditional musical score appears almost completely black—hence the name "Black MIDI".

Black MIDI is a music genre consisting of compositions that use MIDI files to create a song or a remix containing a large number of notes. People who make black MIDI files are known as blackers.

== Origins and early history ==
Though the two are unrelated in origin, the concept of impossible piano existed long before Black MIDI, manifesting itself for example within Conlon Nancarrow's work involving player pianos, in which he punched holes in piano rolls, creating extremely complex musical compositions in the same impossible, unplayable spirit of Black MIDI. Another precursor to Black MIDI is Circus Galop, a player piano composition written by Canadian virtuoso Marc-Andre Hamelin, featuring complex and impossible arrangement with up to 21 notes played simultaneously. Frank Zappa also wrote a dense and extremely difficult composition called "The Black Page".

Black MIDI was first employed in Shirasagi Yukki @ Kuro Yuki Gohan's rendition of "U.N. Owen Was Her?", an extra boss theme from the Touhou Project shooter video game The Embodiment of Scarlet Devil. It was uploaded to the Japanese video-sharing site Nico Nico Douga in 2009, and public awareness of Black MIDI spread from Japan to China and Korea in the following two years. In its early years, Black MIDI compositions were represented visually with traditional, two-stave piano sheet music, containing a number of notes only in the thousands. They were created with MIDI sequencers such as Music Studio Producer, and Singer Song Writer, and played through MIDI players such as MAMPlayer and Timidity++. The Black MIDI community in Japan vanished and, according to Jason Nguyen, the group was "analogous to those TV shows where there's a mysterious founder of a civilization that is not really known throughout the course of the show".

== Popularity outside Japan ==
The popularity of Black MIDI spread to Europe and the United States due to a video of a composition uploaded to YouTube by user kakakakaito1998 in February 2011 and the major impulse of YouTube user John L. Sinnesloschen who versioned kakakakaito's sheets and elaborated his own compositions and sheets. Shortly thereafter, blackers from around the world began pushing limits of the style by making compositions with notes increasing into the millions, and using an enormous number of colors and patterns to match the complexity of the notes.

The first of these tracks to reach the million-note mark was "Necrofantasia" from Touhou Project video game Perfect Cherry Blossom, arranged by TheTrustedComputer. The end of the title of many Black MIDI videos displays how many notes are in the piece. The number of notes and file sizes that could be played back has grown as the computational power of consumer hardware has increased, and while Black MIDIs of Japanese video game music and anime are still common, the genre has also spilled into compositions based on contemporary pop songs.

English-language blackers have formed collaboration groups, such as the Black MIDI Team, where they make MIDI files and visuals together so they can be uploaded online sooner. Blackers around the world have used software such as Synthesia, FL Studio, SynthFont, Virtual MIDI Piano Keyboard, Piano From Above, MIDITrail, vanBasco's Karaoke Player, Ultralight MIDI Player (a Java program), Zenith, MAMPlayer, Music Studio Producer, Singer Song Writer, Tom's MIDI Player, TMIDI, Timidity++, and Kiva, to create and play Black MIDIs. Some of them, like Jason, record the MIDI files at a slow tempo and then speed the footage up in video editing to avoid RAM and processing issues.

== Analysis and reception ==
The term "Black MIDI" is derived from the appearance of the sheet music representation of the music, in which there are so many notes in proximity that the page looks nearly entirely black. According to California-based blacker TheTrustedComputer, Black MIDI was intended as more of a remix style than an actual genre, and derived from the idea of "bullet hell" shoot 'em up games, which involved "so many bullets at a time your eyes can't keep up". Black MIDI has also been considered the digital equivalent, as well as a response, to composer Conlon Nancarrow's use of the player piano which also involved experimenting with several thick notes to compose intricate pieces without hands. The Guide to Black MIDI, however, denies this influence: "We believe that references to Conlon Nancarrow and piano rolls are too deep and Black MIDI origins must be found in digital MIDI music world [sic]."

Black MIDI received some early coverage from Michael Connor, a writer for the non-profit arts organization Rhizome, in September 2013, leading to attention from publications and bloggers including Aux, Gawker's Adrian Chen, Jason Kottke, and The Verge. It has garnered acclaim from journalists, bloggers and electronic musicians, with many noting it as a distinctive and engaging genre thanks to how regular piano notes are combined to make new, abstract sounds not heard in many styles of music, as well as the visuals representing the notes. Hackaday's Elliot Williams spotlighted the style as ironic, given that the fast-paced arpeggios and "splatter-chords" that are developed with a restricted number of voices come together to make other tones that leads to a piano sounding more like a chiptune and less like an actual piano.
