= Other Minds (organization) =

Contemporary music organization

Logo

Other Minds (OM) is an American nonprofit organization based in San Francisco. It was founded In 1992 by Charles Amirkhanian and Jim Newman. According to their mission statement, the organization is dedicated to the "encouragement and propagation of contemporary music."

The name "Other Minds" has been attributed by Jim Newman to an anonymous obituary that ran in The New Yorker in 1992 which stated that John Cage "...composed music in other people's minds." Other Minds has achieved wide recognition and acclaim including the ASCAP award in 2009 for adventurous programming, the American Music Center's 2005 letter of distinction for service to American composers, and the American Composers Forum 2017 Champion of New Music award for Other Minds Executive and Artistic Director Charles Amirkhanian.

== Concerts ==
Other Minds Festival
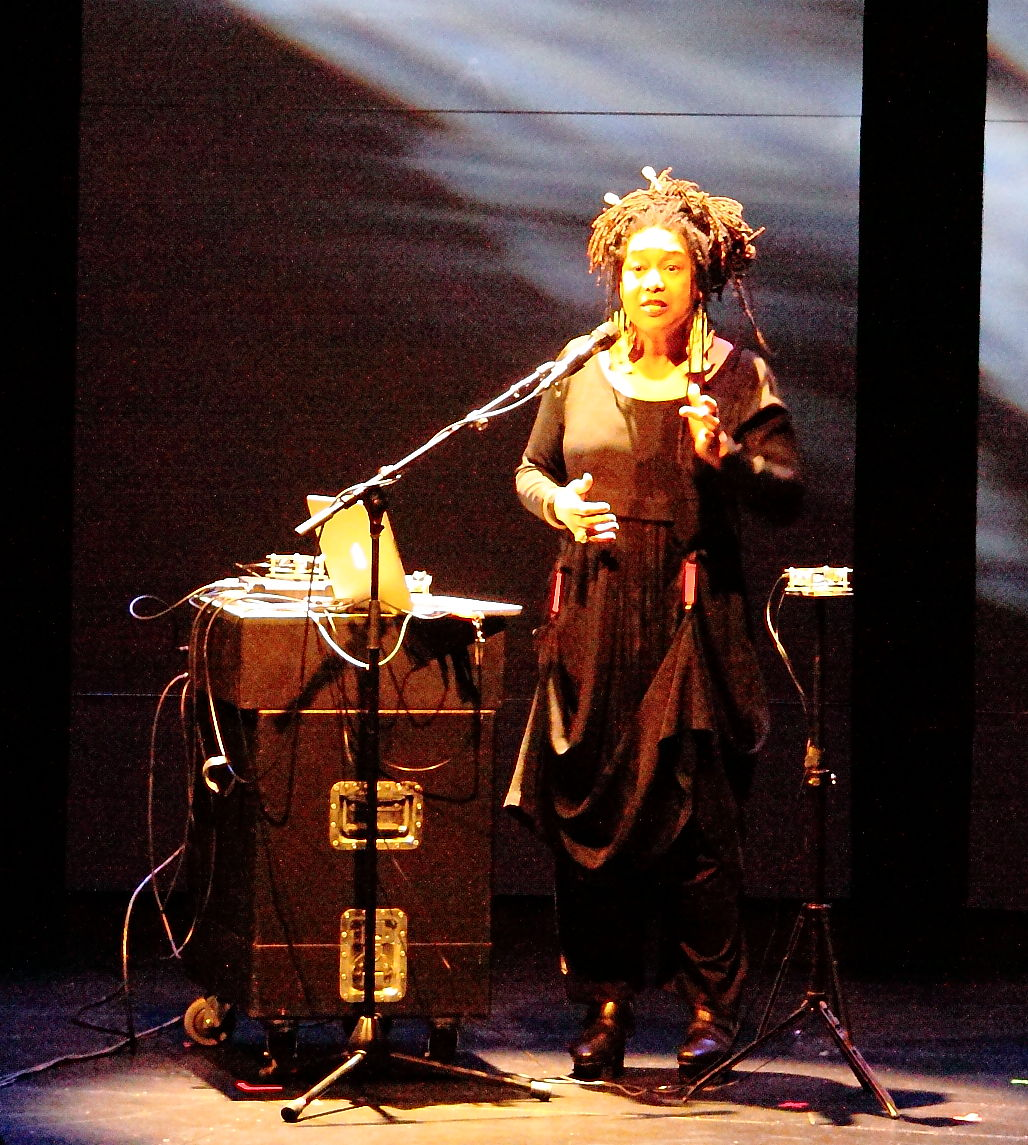
- Genre: Experimental music, contemporary classical music
- Locations: Taube Atrium Theater, The Great Star Theater, ODC Theater, Mission Dolores Basilica, SFJAZZ Center, Kanbar Hall, Yerba Buena Center for the Arts, Palace of Fine Arts Theater, Cowell Theater, Theater Artaud, Gray Area, Brava Theater
- Years active: 1993-present
- Founders: Charles Amirkhanian and Jim Newman
- Website: Website for Other Minds

Since 1993, Other Minds has presented an annual festival featuring a wide range of international composers. These concerts were previously produced in conjunction with an artist residency retreat held at the Djerassi Resident Artists Program in Woodside, California south of San Francisco in which that year's artists had an opportunity to share their work with each other prior to the festival performances.

In addition, Other Minds organizes concerts and events in various venues in the Bay Area throughout the year, including the series "The Nature of Music" and "Latitudes." "New Music Seances" feature live performances with local artists of music by lesser known past masters such as Henry Cowell, Ruth Crawford, Dane Rudhyar, Alan Hovhaness, and Lester Bowie. Special concerts have been held celebrating the centennials of composers Morton Feldman, Alan Hovhaness, and Conlon Nancarrow, the piano music of Philip Glass, and the 50th anniversary of Fluxus.

The annual festival was held at the Brava Theater in San Francisco in 2025.

Composers represented in the annual festival have included such artists as Meredith Monk, Muhal Richard Abrams, Terry Riley, Philip Glass, Frederic Rzewski, Margaret Leng Tan, Henry Brant, Conlon Nancarrow, Robert Ashley, Pauline Oliveros, Lou Harrison, Laurie Anderson, Julia Wolfe, Natasha Barrett, LaMonte Young, Tigran Mansurian, Leroy Jenkins, Ben Johnston, Janice Giteck, Kyle Gann, Olly Wilson, William Parker, Gavin Bryars, Michael Nyman, Brian Eno, Øyvind Torvund, Raven Chacon, Mary Kouyoudmjian, Carl Stone, and many others. Henry Brant's Pulitzer Prize winning Ice Field from 2001 was an Other Minds commission. Grawemeyer Award winner Louis Andriessen was featured in 2011 as were MacArthur Fellows Jason Moran in 2011 and Ikue Mori and Tyshawn Sorey in 2021.

== Preservation & Online Archives ==
radiOM logo

Since 2000, Other Minds has been involved in preserving audiovisual materials which includes an extensive audio collection from the KPFA Music Dept. Archives, as well as the organization's own programming collection. In 2002 Other Minds inaugurated a free online archive called radiOM, where users could access hundreds of hours of archival audio material including interviews with prominent composers of our time, past OM festival performances, examples of sound poetry, and much more. On January 26, 2024, Other Minds relaunched its archive as the Other Minds Archives with additional collections of audio interviews, musical recordings, photographs, and ephemera.

The organization's physical archives have been housed at UC Santa Cruz since 2016. This includes approximately 4,000 reel-to reel, cassette, DAT, and video tapes of interviews and live performances from the Berkeley-based radio station KPFA.

== Broadcasts ==
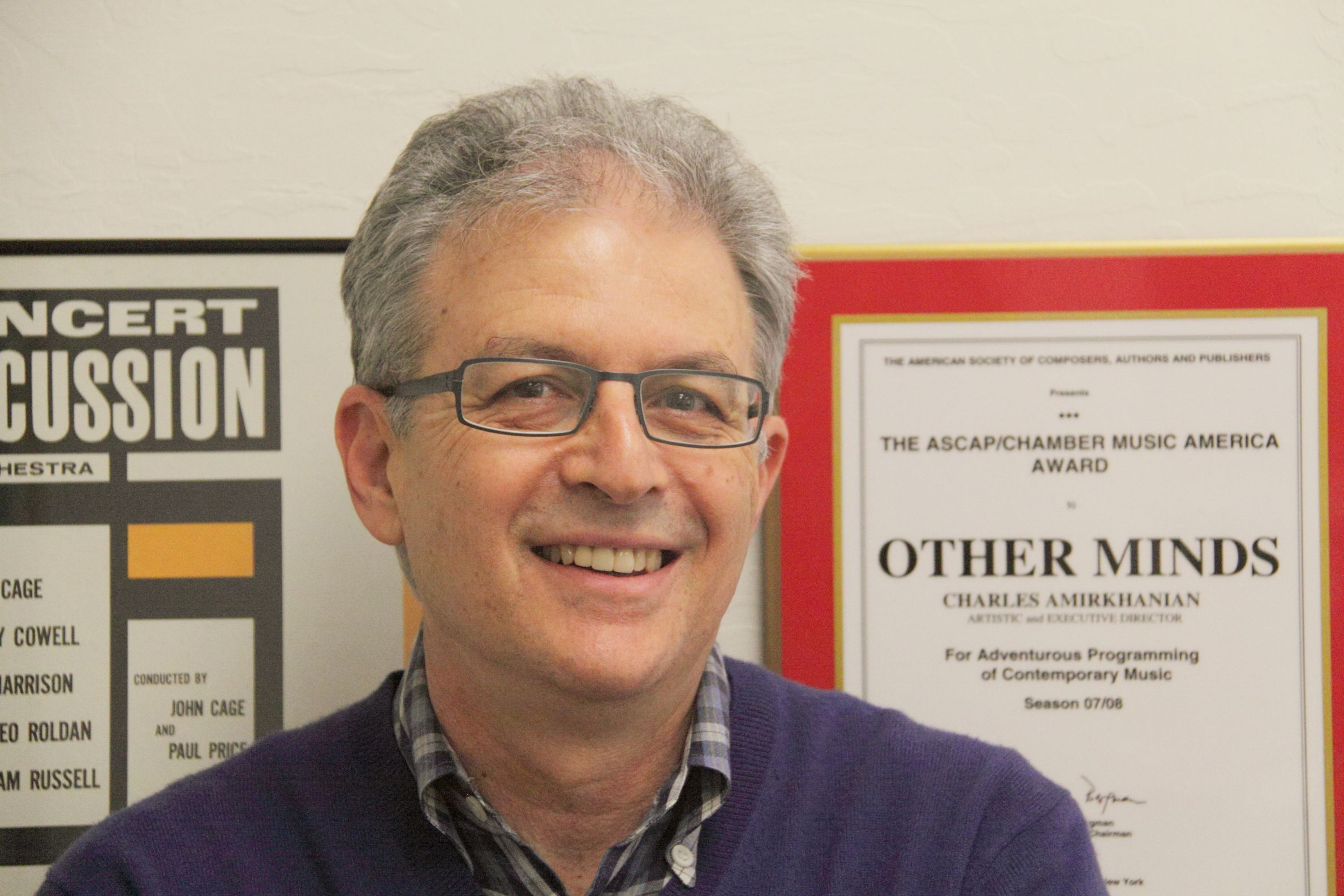
Executive Director Charles Amirkhanian in his office with ASCAP award in background

Music from Other Minds is a weekly program produced and hosted by Charles Amirkhanian and Other Minds staff since 2005. It is broadcast on San Francisco radio station KALW and features a wide variety of international new music common to the mission of Other Minds. Weekly programs are also accessible via streaming from the program website following the broadcast.

The Other Minds Podcast was launched in 2022 and features interviews with composers and performers of contemporary music such as Raven Chacon, Pamela Z, Theresa Wong, Lars Petter Hagen, Morton Subotnick, and Mari Kimura.

== Record Label ==
Original vinyl release of Nancarrow's Player Piano Studies autographed by the composer. From the collection of Charles Amirkhanian.

World Premiere recordings of music by Marc Blitzstein

Other Minds also has a record label, with a continually expanding catalog of CDs, LPs, and DVDs. Some of the releases are of recordings from the now defunct 1750 Arch Records such as '10+2:12 American Text Sound Pieces' and the first complete recording (and the only recording done on his own instruments in his Mexico City studio) of Conlon Nancarrow's Player Piano Studies. Other releases include new recordings like 'FIRST LIFE The Rare Early Works' (world premieres of music by Marc Blitzstein), the music of Ezra Pound, and a reissue of Michael Tilson Thomas' The Complete Music of Carl Ruggles with the Buffalo Philharmonic Orchestra.

They also stock a selection of contemporary music CDs and related books and scores from other publishers.

Other Minds also has a digital release series called Modern Hits which is focused on unearthing archival works by the unsung pioneers of electronic music from the Bay Area and beyond.

Recent releases have featured music by Bay Area composers including Cheryl E. Leonard, Brian Baumbusch, Christopher Luna-Mega, Tom Bickley, and Joseph Bohigian, as well as Pulitzer Prize winner Raven Chacon performing with Tatsuya Nakatani and Carlos Santistevan.

== See also ==
- List of experimental music festivals
