= Space Is the Place (soundtrack) =

Soundtrack album by Sun Ra and His Intergalactic Solar Arkestra
- Released: mid-/late 1993
- Recorded: early 1972, Oakland, California
- Genre: Jazz
- Length: 74:21
- Label: Evidence Music
- Producer: Ihnfinity Inc. (music), Jerry Gordon (CD)

Space is the Place is an album by Sun Ra and His Intergalactic Solar Arkestra. The music was recorded in early 1972 in San Francisco, California, for the film Space Is the Place. However, the music remained unreleased until Evidence Music issued a compact disc in 1993.

During the late-1960s and early-1970s, Sun Ra and his ensemble made several forays to California. In 1971, Sun Ra taught a course, "The Black Man in the Cosmos", at University of California, Berkeley. Over the course of these California visits, Sun Ra came to the attention of Jim Newman, who produced the film Space Is the Place starring Sun Ra and his Arkestra, and based, in part, on Sun Ra's Berkeley lectures. The soundtrack CD compiles 16 tracks that Sun Ra recorded for the film.

The soundtrack was reissued as an expanded edition in 2023 with an unreleased album titled The Mathematics of the Altered Destiny which was recorded during the same recording sessions.

== Critical reception ==
Professional ratings
Review scores
Source	Rating
All Music Guide to Jazz	4.5/5 stars
The Penguin Guide to Jazz	3.5/4 stars

The Penguin Guide to Jazz describes the album as "a brisk montage of Arkestra music....[I]t works remarkably well and the playing is tight and enigmatic." The Penguin editors also note that "Mysterious Crystal" is of particular interest, with the track "combining a huge array of elements into something that simply cannot be characterized by reference to any other music." Ron Wynn of the All Music Guide to Jazz describes the tracks as being "among Sun Ra's most ambitious, unorthodox, and compelling compositions."

== Track listing ==
All compositions and arrangements by Sun Ra.

No.	Title	Length
1.	"It's After the End of the World"	3:25
2.	"Under Different Stars"	3:55
3.	"Discipline 33"	3:22
4.	"Watusa"	7:11
5.	"Calling Planet Earth"	3:04
6.	"I Am the Alter-Destiny"	1:08
7.	"Satellites Are Spinning"	2:33
8.	"Cosmic Forces"	3:09
9.	"Outer Spaceways Incorporated"	3:00
10.	"We Travel the Spaceways"	2:28
11.	"The Overseer"	3:04
12.	"Blackman/Love in Outer Space"	16:53
13.	"Mysterious Crystal"	5:53
14.	"I Am the Brother of the Wind"	5:54
15.	"We'll Wait for You"	4:11
16.	"Space Is the Place"	4:23

2023 reissue bonus tracks - The Mathematics of the Altered Destiny
No.	Title	Length
17.	"The Mathematics of the Altered Destiny"	13:18
18.	"Listen Intently to the Things I Do Not Say"	7:10
19.	"Creation Is a Fabrication"	13:45
20.	"My World Is the Space Way"	6:30
21.	"The Idea of the Greater Age"	4:08

== Personnel ==
- Sun Ra – piano, Minimoog, Farfisa organ, Clavinet, Rocksichord, declamation
- Kwame Hadi – trumpet, conga, vibraphone
- Wayne Harris – trumpet
- Marshall Allen – alto saxophone, flute, oboe, bassoon, kora, cowbell, percussion
- Danny Davis – alto saxophone, flute, bass clarinet, percussion
- Larry Northington – alto saxophone, conga, percussion
- John Gilmore – tenor saxophone, drums, percussion, vocals
- Eloe Omoe – bass clarinet, bongos, percussion
- Danny Ray Thompson – baritone saxophone, percussion
- Lex Humphries – drums
- Ken Moshesh – conga
- June Tyson – vocals, bells

== Release history ==
Region	Date	Label	Format	Catalog
Worldwide	1993	Evidence Music	CD	ECD 22070-2
