= Pro Musica Nova =

- Genre: Electronic music, etc.
- Location: Germany (Bremen)
- Years active: 1958 to 2001
- Founders: Hans Otte, Radio Bremen

Pro Musica Nova was a biennial festival for contemporary music sponsored by Radio Bremen from 1958 to 2001. It was founded by Hans Otte. A number of experimental and electronic composers contributed.

== History ==
From 1960 it was held in alternate years to the Pro Musica Antiqua festival of the same radio station, which also ceased in 2001. The two festivals took their name from Pro Musica Antiqua founded by Safford Cape in the 1930s which had influenced the creation of Archiv Produktion by Deutsche Grammophon.

Pro Musica Nova introduced the public to the music of composers including Karlheinz Stockhausen, John Cage, Mauricio Kagel, György Ligeti, Terry Riley, La Monte Young, Conlon Nancarrow and Hans-Joachim Hespos. Otte also commissioned many new works for the festival.

== See also ==
- List of electronic music festivals
