= Hans Otte =

German composer (1926–2007)

Hans Günther Franz Otte

Hans Günther Franz Otte (3 December 1926 – 25 December 2007) was a German composer, pianist, radio promoter, and author of many pieces of musical theatre, sound installations, poems, drawings and video art. From 1959 to 1984 Otte served as music director for Radio Bremen. Beginning in the early 1960s, he frequently presented experimental American minimal music composers in his Bremen radio festival Pro Musica Nova, including John Cage, David Tudor, Terry Riley, and La Monte Young.

Otte was born in Plauen. He studied in Germany, Italy, and at Yale University in the United States. His teachers included the composer Paul Hindemith and the pianist Walter Gieseking. From 1959 on, Otte lived and worked in Bremen, Germany. His catalogue of compositions contains more than 100 works.

Some of Otte's works, especially his extended suites for solo piano, are characterized by very minimal means but are nevertheless quite subtle and sophisticated in their architecture and expression. For his work, Otte drew significantly on European and Asian spirituality, integrating various prayers into the fabric of the music.

Das Buch der Klänge (The Book of Sounds, 1979–82) and Stundenbuch (Book of Hours, 1991–98) are his best-known pieces in this genre, and Otte often performed them himself. His last public recital was given in Amsterdam in 1999. Recordings of these works, with Otte as performer, are available on CD.

In 1991 his work "KlangHaus" became a permanent interactive sound installation in the Neues Museum Weserburg Bremen in Bremen, Germany, where he died.

A book, Hans Otte : Klang der Klänge = Sound of sounds, by Ingo Ahmels (de), was published in 2006. An accompanying DVD contained excerpts from a conversation with Otte by Ahmels in 1999, and further excerpts from conversations with Herbert Henck from 2001, and with Hans-Joachim Hespos from 2004. It also contained the Otte-Werkeverzeichnis (OWV), a complete catalogue of Otte's works compiled by Ahmels, and authorized by Otte.
