= Space Is the Place =

- Region 1 DVD cover
- Directed by: John Coney
- Written by: Sun Ra; Joshua Smith
- Produced by: Jim Newman
- Starring: Sun Ra; Raymond Johnson; Seth Hill (uncredited)
- Cinematography: Seth Hill
- Edited by: Barbara Pokras
- Music by: Sun Ra
- Release date: November 1974
- Running time: 85 minutes
- Country: United States
- Language: English

Space Is the Place is an Afrofuturist science fiction film made in 1972 and released in 1974. It was directed by John Coney, written by Sun Ra and Joshua Smith, and features Sun Ra and his Arkestra. A soundtrack was released on Evidence Records.

== Background ==
During the late-1960s and early-1970s, Sun Ra and his ensemble made several forays to California. In 1971, Sun Ra taught a course, "The Black Man in the Cosmos", at University of California, Berkeley. Over the course of these California visits, Sun Ra came to the attention of Jim Newman, who produced the film Space Is the Place starring Sun Ra and his Arkestra, and based, in part, on Sun Ra's Berkeley lectures.

== Plot ==
Sun Ra, who has been reported lost since his European tour in June 1969, lands on a new planet in outer space with his crew, known as "the Arkestra", and decides to settle African Americans on this planet. The medium of transportation he chooses for this resettlement is music. He travels back in time and returns to the Chicago strip club where he used to play piano with the name "Sonny Ray" in 1943, where he confronts the Overseer (Ray Johnson), a pimp-overlord, and they agree on a game of cards for the fate of the Black race.

In present time (the early 1970s), Ra disembarks from his spaceship in Oakland and tries to spread word of his plans. He meets with young African Americans at an Oakland youth centre and opens an "Outer Space Employment Agency" to recruit people eager to move to the planet. He also agrees with Jimmy Fey (Christopher Brooks) — an employee of the Overseer — to arrange radio interviews, a record album, and eventually a concert that will help him dictate his message.

As the card game between Ra and the Overseer is played, and it becomes clear that the Overseer is winning, Ra's plans to recruit local black youth for his new utopian space colony suffer setbacks. Many of them are suspicious of Ra, accusing him of faking his outer-spatial origin as a gimmick to boost his record sales. He is kidnapped by a team of white NASA scientists who threaten him with violence, desperate to learn the secrets to his space-travel technology. As Ra's concert rapidly approaches, he is saved by three local teenagers, who escort him to the music hall just in time.

At the concert, as the Arkestra play their signature free jazz, the NASA scientists appear and attempt to assassinate Ra with a pistol. One of the teenagers jumps in front of the bullet, saving Ra's life, and as he is bleeding out on the stage, Sun Ra waves his hand and the teenager, his friends, and Ra himself all disappear from the music hall. One by one, black people across Oakland vanish into thin air and reappear on Ra's spaceship.

Jimmy Fey resists leaving Earth on Ra's spaceship, but Ra doesn't let Fey leave; Ra takes Fey's "black parts" with him onto the spaceship, leaving his "white parts" behind on Earth. Fey, now acting white, leaves the Overseer, who loses the duel. As Ra's spaceship launches off into the cosmos and music begins playing, a montage implies that Earth is destroyed in its wake.

== Production and release ==
Space Is the Place emerged from Dilexi, an "experimental art series" produced by Jim Newman and directed by John Coney. Wishing to build on his forays into filming avant-garde music, Newman recruited Coney to film concert footage of Ra and His Arkestra; Coney then hired Seth Hill to act as cinematographer. Filming of Arkestra performance footage was followed shortly by a scant number of loosely scripted dramatic scenes. Hill was then asked to create "a story to tie all the disparate elements together." To this end, Hill enlisted the help of Joshua Smith, a friend from film school whose fascination with "the culture of pimps and whores" would result in the blaxploitation themes underpinning those scenes in the film not involving Sun Ra. According to assistant director Tom Bullock, the "seemingly death-defying existential leaps in logic and continuity" that resulted from the film's fragmented production were resolved in post-production by editor Barbara Pokras.

Two cuts exist of the film. The first, sometimes referred to as "Sun Ra's edit", is abridged to 64 minutes; for decades following its limited initial release, Space is the Place could only be found on VHS in this form. The second, uncut version runs 82 minutes, and was made available for the first time in 2003, when the film was re-released by Plexifilm. Following another lapse out of print, both cuts of Space is the Place were released together for the first time by Harte Recordings in 2015.

The film inspired The Bright Light Social Hour's album Space Is Still the Place (2015).

== Interpretation ==
It has been suggested that Space Is the Place can be interpreted as Sun Ra's response to the Black Panther Party for Self-Defense, with whom Ra was engaged in a performative struggle for the imagery of the future of the black race. Daniel Kreiss writes:

While he does not condemn the party by name, Sun Ra ultimately finds limited value in terrestrial community programs, an allusion to the Panthers, and posits that only the band's use of technology and music will liberate the people by changing consciousness.

== See also ==
- List of Afrofuturist films
- Africanfuturism
- List of American films of 1974
