= Charles Amirkhanian =

American composer (born 1945)

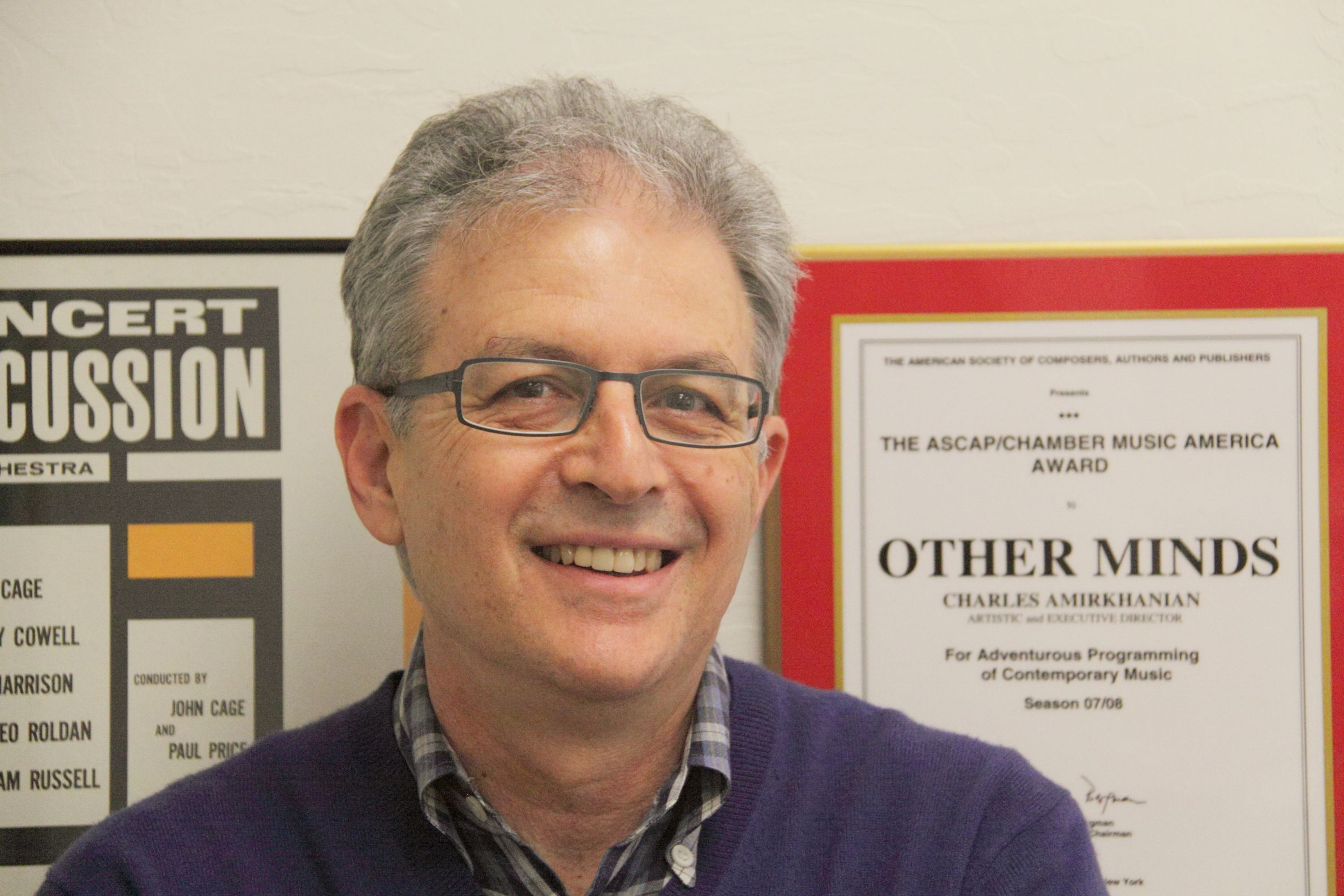
Charles Amirkhanian

Charles Benjamin Amirkhanian (born January 19, 1945; Fresno, California) is an American composer. He is a percussionist, sound poet, and radio producer of Armenian origin. He is mostly known for his electroacoustic and text-sound music.

== Career ==
Amirkhanian received his Master of Fine Arts from Mills College in 1980, where he studied electronic music and techniques of sound recording. He was music director of Pacifica Radio's KPFA-FM in Berkeley, California, from 1969 to 1992, where he initiated the long-running program dedicated to avant-garde music, Ode to Gravity. He was also a lecturer in the Interdisciplinary Creative Arts Department at San Francisco State University from 1977 to 1980. He co-directed the Telluride Institute's Composer to Composer festival in Telluride, Colorado, between 1988 and 1991. Amirkhanian is the executive director and artistic director of the Other Minds Music Festival in San Francisco, which he co-founded with Jim Newman in 1992. He has played a key role in recording and championing the work of Conlon Nancarrow and George Antheil, among others.

In 1984, the American Music Center awarded him its Letter of Distinction for service to American composers through his work at KPFA FM in Berkeley, California. This was followed in 2005 by another for his co-founding and directing the Other Minds Festival in San Francisco. From ASCAP in 1989 he received the Deems Taylor Award, also for service to American composers. Amirkhanian received a 1997 Foundation for Contemporary Arts Grants to Artists Award. In 2009, Chamber Music America and ASCAP honored him for his Adventurous Programming of Contemporary Music with Other Minds. In 2017, the American Composers Forum honored him with its Champion of New Music award.

== Discography ==
- 10+2: 12 American Text-Sound Pieces (1975). 1750 Arch Records S-1752 (LP) reissued in 2003 on Other Minds/CD 1006-2 compilation which includes Amirkhanian's 'Just (1972)' and 'Heavy Aspirations (1973)
- Lexical Music (1979). 1750 Arch Records S-1779 (LP), reissued in 2017 on Other Minds Records OM 1023-2 (CD).
- Polipoetry Issues Numero 3: American Sound Poetry (1983). 3Vitre – EM 00383 (limited edition 7" LP) Compilation containing Amirkhanian's 'The Putts'
- Mental Radio: Nine Text-Sound Compositions (1985). CRI-SD 523 (LP); reissued in 2009 on New World Records NWCRL 523 (CD)
- Perspectives of New Music (1988). Compilation CD accompanying volume 26 issue. Contains: Pas de Voix (Portrait of Samuel Beckett)
- Charles Amirkhanian and Noah Creshevsky: Auxesis: Electroacoustic Music, Centaur Records (1995) – CRC 2194
- Walking Tune (1998). Starkland ST-206. "One of the Year's 20 best CDs," according to the Electronic Music Foundation.
- Charles Amirkhanian: Loudspeakers (2019). New World Records 80817 (2-CD set).
- Miatsoom (2021). Other Minds Records OM 1029-2 Contains: Dzarin Bess Ga Khorim, Roussier (not Rouffier), Three Armenians, & Miatsoom
- Charles Amirkhanian & Carol Law Hypothetical Moments—Collaborative Works 1975-1985 (2022). Other Minds Records OM 4001 DVD. Video works by Carol Law, music by Amirkhanian.
