= Wolfgang Heisig =

German pianist and composer

Wolfgang Heisig (born in 1952) is a German pianist and composer who is known for his contemporary application of piano rolls.

== Life and career ==
Born in Zwickau, Heisig studied piano and composition at the Hochschule für Musik Carl Maria von Weber in Dresden between 1972 and 1978. Since 1980 he has composed short aphoristic piano pieces, which form the collection Klaviertöne. He also worked for the Duo Sonnenschirm, on whose debut album he participated in 1989. Furthermore, he was involved in the composition of the film music for the feature film Der Junge mit dem großen schwarzen Hund.

Since 1990, Heisig has been intensively engaged with the music of the composer Conlon Nancarrow, who often punched his compositions into paper rolls that were played with player pianos. Since Nancarrow was hardly interested in the duplication and distribution of these rolls, Heisig not only acquired a Phonola to interpret the works through nuanced pedalling and actuation of dynamic and tempo levers. He also had a PC-controlled punching machine built to produce and perform Nancarrow's compositions on a music roll. In the meantime, this has resulted in the world's only music roll edition of Nancarrow's works.

Heisig also duplicates his own compositions with the roll technique. In his concerts he interprets Nancarrow as well as his own and other contemporary works. In 2011 he published an album with contemporary phonola music with the Musikproduktion Dabringhaus und Grimm; he also wrote a volume of poetry which was published by Frankfurter Verlagsgruppe in 2018. With Michael Wollny, Émile Parisien, Max Stadtfeld and Leafcutter John, he played at the ceremony "100 Years Bauhaus" at the Academy of Arts, Berlin. In 2007 Heisig received the Gellert Prize.

== Compositions ==
- Sprachfachübungen.
- Phonola.
- Methodenenwicklungen zur Identitätsprüfung pflanzlicher Drogen : mit weiterführenden Untersuchungen an den Infloreszenzen von 'Calendula officinalis' L.
- Mars saugt Mut : for phonola and sampler.
- List of 13 Compositions in the German National Library.
