= Conlon Nancarrow =

American-Mexican composer

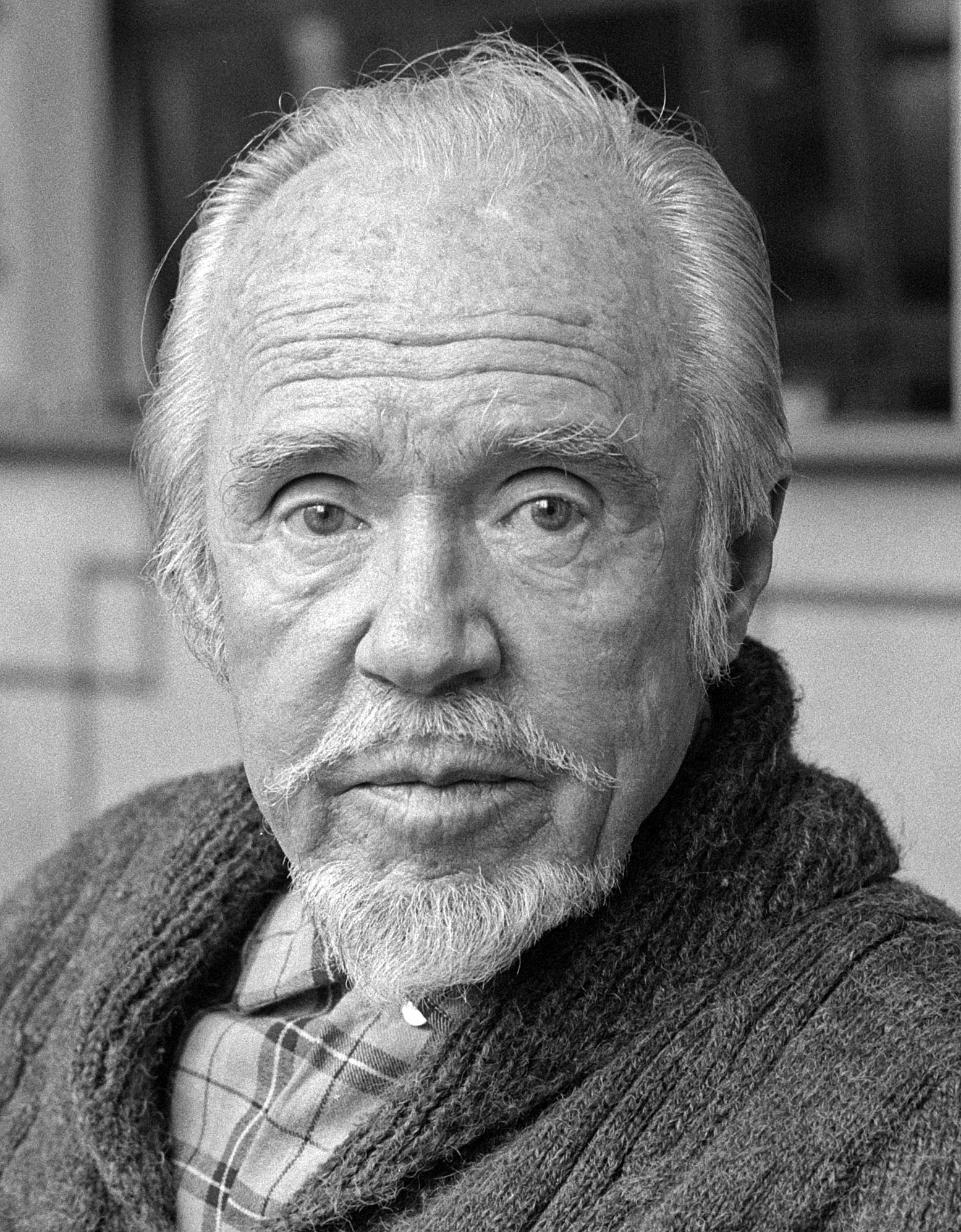
- Nancarrow in 1987
- Born: Samuel Conlon Nancarrow; October 27, 1912; Texarkana, Arkansas, U.S.
- Died: August 10, 1997 (aged 84); Mexico City, Mexico
- Occupation: Composer
- Known for: Studies for Player Piano

Samuel Conlon Nancarrow (/nænˈkæroʊ/; October 27, 1912 – August 10, 1997) was a US-born Mexican composer. Nancarrow is best remembered for his Studies for Player Piano, being one of the first composers to use auto-playing musical instruments, realizing their potential to play far beyond human performance ability. He lived most of his life in relative isolation and did not become widely known until the 1980s.

== Biography ==
=== Early years ===
Nancarrow was born in Texarkana, Arkansas, United States. He played trumpet in a jazz band in his youth before studying music, first in Cincinnati and later in Boston, with Roger Sessions, Walter Piston and Nicolas Slonimsky. He attended the National Music Camp and later met Arnold Schoenberg during that composer's brief stay in Boston in 1933. At the age of 15, Nancarrow enrolled at Vanderbilt University School of Engineering at the insistence of his father.

In Boston, Nancarrow joined the Communist Party USA. When the Spanish Civil War broke out, he traveled to Spain to join the XV International Brigade, which fought on the Republican side. He was interned at the Gurs internment camp in France in 1939. Upon his return to the United States in 1939, he learned that his Brigade colleagues were finding it difficult to renew their US passports. After spending some time in New York City, Nancarrow moved to Mexico in 1940 in order to escape similar harassment.

He visited the United States briefly in 1947 and became a Mexican citizen in 1956; his next appearance in the US was in San Francisco for the New Music America festival in 1981. He traveled regularly in the following years and lived in the current Casa Estudio Conlon Nancarrow (designed by Juan O'Gorman) in Las Águilas, Mexico City, until his death at 84 on August 10, 1997. He was friends with some Mexican composers but was largely unknown in the local music establishment.

=== As a composer ===
It was in Mexico that Nancarrow did the work for which he is best known. He had already written some music in the United States, but the technical demands of his compositions were such that satisfactory performances were rare. According to Annette Nancarrow, Nancarrow in Mexico was still frustrated by the "technical difficulties involved with two human hands playing his compositions on a piano," which he discussed with Arthur Gregor, a friend who was a school principal. They found a shop where Nancarrow bought a device that could create player piano rolls, and "worked with the owner to learn technical details, such as how to record loud and soft, and different types of notes, and improve the machine." They were following a suggestion from Henry Cowell's book New Musical Resources, which Nancarrow bought in New York in 1939. The player piano could produce complex rhythmic patterns at a speed beyond the abilities of humans.

Cowell had suggested that just as there is a scale of pitch frequencies, there might also be a scale of tempi. Nancarrow undertook to create music which would superimpose tempi in cogent pieces and, by his twenty-first composition for player piano, he had begun "sliding" (increasing and decreasing) tempi within strata. (See William Duckworth, Talking Music.) Nancarrow later said he had been interested in exploring electronic resources but that the piano rolls ultimately gave him more temporal control over his music.

Temporarily buoyed by an inheritance, Nancarrow traveled to New York City in 1947 and bought a custom-built manual punching machine to enable him to punch the piano rolls. The machine was an adaptation of one used in the commercial production of rolls, and using it was very hard work and very slow. He also adapted the player pianos, increasing their dynamic range by tinkering with their mechanism and covering the hammers with leather (in one player piano) and metal (in the other) so as to produce a more percussive sound. On this trip to New York, he met Cowell and heard a performance of John Cage's Sonatas and Interludes for prepared piano (also influenced by Cowell's aesthetics), which would later lead to Nancarrow's modestly experimenting with prepared piano in his Study No. 30.

Nancarrow's first pieces combined the harmonic language and melodic motifs of early jazz pianists like Art Tatum with extraordinarily complicated metrical schemes. The first five rolls he made are called the Boogie-Woogie Suite (later assigned the name Study No. 3 a-e). His later works were abstract, with no obvious references to any music apart from his own.

Many of these later pieces (which he generally called studies) are prolation canons. While most canons using this device, such as those by Johann Sebastian Bach, have the meters of the various parts in simple ratios such as 2:1, Nancarrow's canons are in far more complicated ratios. The Study No. 40, for example, has its parts in the ratio e:pi, while the Study No. 37 has twelve individual melodic lines, each one moving at a different tempo.

Having spent many years in obscurity, Nancarrow benefited from the 1969 release of an album of his work by Columbia Records as part of the label's "Music of Our Time" series.

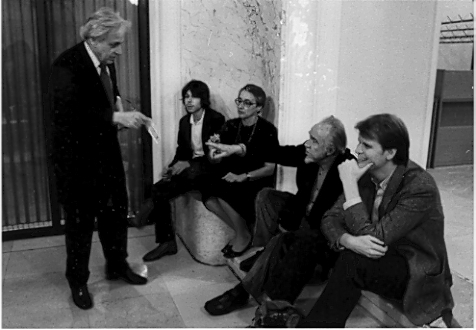
From left to right: György Ligeti, Lukas Ligeti, Vera Ligeti (György Ligeti's wife), Conlon Nancarrow, and Michael Daugherty at the ISCM World Music Days in Graz, Austria, 1982

=== Later life ===
In 1976–77, Peter Garland began publishing Nancarrow's scores in his Soundings journal, and Charles Amirkhanian began releasing recordings of the player piano works on 1750 Arch Records. Thus, at age 65, Nancarrow started coming to wide public attention. He became better known in the 1980s and was lauded by many, including György Ligeti, as one of the most significant composers of the century.

In 1982, he received a MacArthur Award which paid him $300,000 over 5 years. This increased interest in his work prompted him to write for conventional instruments, and he composed several works for small ensembles.

In 1987, a composer and instrument builder named Trimpin would work with Nancarrow to preserve his pieces in an early MIDI format using his piano roll reader. Then, from that data, the music could be converted into relevant mediums such as the cassette tape and the floppy disk.

Nancarrow was married to artist Annette Margolis Nancarrow, the grandmother of American journalist Bret Stephens.

On March 2, 1971, Nancarrow married Yoko Sugiura Yamamoto in Mexico City.

Nancarrow died in 1997 in Mexico City. The complete contents of his studio, including the player piano rolls, the instruments, the libraries, and other documents and objects, are held by the Paul Sacher Foundation in Basel, Switzerland.

== Reception ==
György Ligeti described the music of Conlon Nancarrow as "the greatest discovery since Webern and Ives ... something great and important for all music history! His music is so utterly original, enjoyable, perfectly constructed, but at the same time emotional ... for me it's the best music of any composer living today."

== Legacy ==
In 1995, the composer and critic Kyle Gann published a full-length study of Nancarrow's output, The Music of Conlon Nancarrow (Cambridge University Press, 1995, 303 pp.). Jürgen Hocker, another Nancarrow specialist, published Begegnungen mit Nancarrow (neue Zeitschrift für Musik, Schott Musik International, Mainz 2002, 284 pp.)

Some of Nancarrow's studies for player piano have been arranged for musicians to play on other instruments.

The German musician Wolfgang Heisig has long given live performances of Nancarrow's rolls, as did Jürgen Hocker until his death in 2012. Both used acoustical instruments similar to Nancarrow's.

Other performers of Nancarrow's works (often in arrangement for live musicians) include Thomas Adès, Alarm Will Sound, and ensemble Calefax from the Netherlands who also recorded the Studies for player piano, hailed as 'Best CD of 2009' by Dutch newspaper Het Parool. American clarinetist and composer Evan Ziporyn has adapted a number of Nancarrow's player piano studies for the Bang on a Can All-Stars to perform live.

Nancarrow's work has also been seen as a predecessor to Black MIDI, a genre of experimental electronic music.

Nancarrow was an early inspiration to the American computer scientist and composer Jaron Lanier.

In 2012, Other Minds in collaboration with Cal Performances and the Berkeley Art Museum and Pacific Film Archive held a three-day festival of films and music celebrating Nancarrow's centennial in Berkeley, California.

In 2024, composer and sound artist Dario Acuña Fuentes-Berain ("Dario Afb") used a collection of objects contributed by artist Lenka Clayton to prepare the late Conlon Nancarrow's historic piano, then composed and performed a new work on the altered instrument in Nancarrow's Mexico City studio.

== Recordings ==
Columbia Records MS 7222 (released 1969, deleted 1973) Studies Nos. 2, 7, 8, 10, 12, 15, 19, 21, 23, 24, 25, 33. Recorded at the composer's studio under his supervision. Includes the original version of Study #10.

New World Records "Sound Forms for Piano" (LP released 1976, CD released 1995) includes Studies Nos. 1, 27 and 36, which were recorded at the composer's studio in 1973 using his two Ampico player pianos, and recording equipment described as "antiquated but well maintained".

1750 Arch Records (recorded 1977) produced by Charles Amirkhanian and originally released on 4 LPs between 1977 and 1984. These are the only available recordings using Nancarrow's original instruments: two 1927 Ampico player pianos, one with metal-covered felt hammers and the other with leather strips on the hammers, representing the most faithful reproduction of what Nancarrow heard in his own studio.

Nancarrow's entire output for player piano has been recorded and released on the German Wergo label in 1989–91.

In 1993, BMG released a CD (090262611802) of works by Nancarrow (Studies for Player Piano, Tango, Toccata, Piece No.2 for Small Orchestra, Trio, Sarabande & Scherzo) played by Ensemble Modern, conducted by Ingo Metzmacher.

In March 2000, Other Minds Records released a CD of largely forgotten works by Nancarrow, Lost Works, Last Works, including previously unrecorded works such as Piece for Tape and Nancarrow's own recording of his study for prepared player piano, in addition to an interview with the composer himself.

In July 2008, Other Minds Records released a newly remastered version of the 1750 Arch Records recordings on 4 CDs. The 4-CD set includes a 52-page booklet with the original liner notes by James Tenney, an essay by producer Charles Amirkhanian and 24 illustrations.

A recording of "Study #7", arranged for orchestra, was performed by the London Sinfonietta and included on their 2006 CD Warp Works & Twentieth Century Masters.

An arrangement of "Player Piano Study #6" for piano and marimba was recorded by Alan Feinberg and Daniel Druckman on Feinberg's 1994 album Fascinating Rhythm. Feinberg also recorded the pre-Player Piano era piece "Prelude" on the 1995 album The American Innovator on Argo / Decca.

== List of works ==
- Note: For a detailed listing of the player piano studies, see: Kyle Gann's Conlon Nancarrow: Annotated List of Works.
- Note: For an updated list (Jan 2008) of ALL the works, arrangements and editions included, see: Monika Fürst-Heidtmann "Dated and commented list of the works, premieres and arrangements of the music of Conlon Nancarrow".

=== Player piano ===
- Studies #1–30, (1948–1960) (#30 for prepared player piano)
- Studies #31–37, #40–51, (1965–1992) (#38 and #39 renumbered as #43 and #48)
- For Yoko (1990)
- Contraption #1 for computer-driven prepared piano (1993)

=== Piano ===
- Blues (1935)
- Prelude (1935)
- Sonatina (1941)
- 3 Two-Part Studies (1940s)
- Tango? (1983)
- 3 Canons for Ursula (1989)

=== Chamber ===
- Sarabande and Scherzo for oboe, bassoon and piano (1930)
- Toccata for violin and piano (1935)
- Septet (1940)
- Trio for clarinet, bassoon and piano, #1, (1942)
- String Quartet #1 (1945)
- String Quartet #2 (late 1940s) incomplete
- String Quartet #3 (1987)
- Trio for oboe, bassoon and piano, #2 (1991)
- Player Piano Study #34 arranged for string trio

=== Orchestral ===
- Piece #1 for small orchestra (1943)
- Piece #2 for small orchestra (1985)
- Study for Orchestra, canon 4:5:6, (1990–91), Original C.N. orchestration: 3 flute, 3 oboes, 3 clarinets, abass clarinet, 2 bassoons, 3 French horns, 3 trumpets, 3 trombones, 2 vibraharps, 2 xylophones, marimba, one computer-controlled piano, piano, 6 violins, 2 cellos, 3 double basses. In two movements. Based on the Study 49 a-c.
