= Jim Newman (television producer) =

American film and television producer, musician

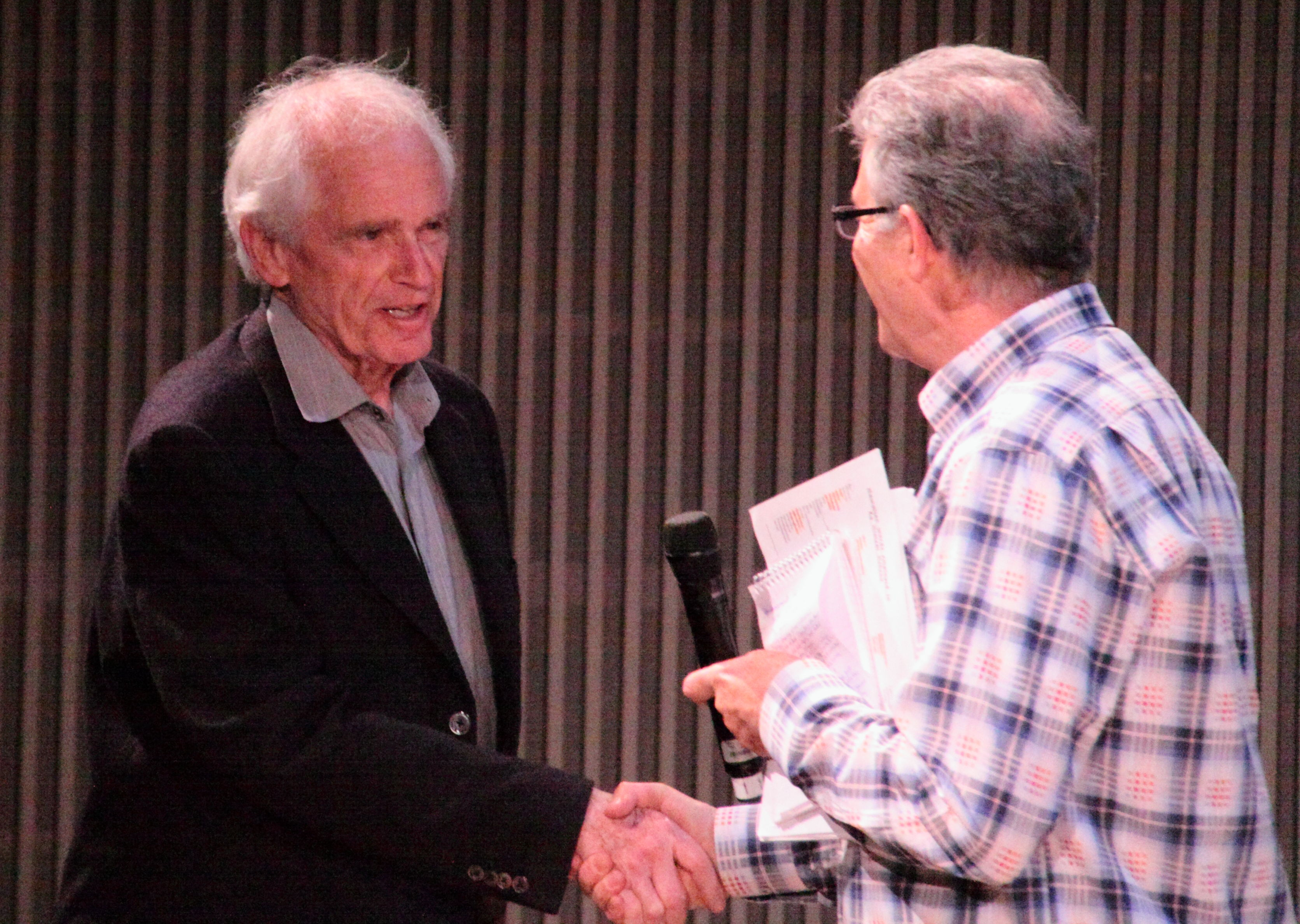
Jim Newman (film and television producer, gallerist)

Jim Newman (born 1933 in Omaha, Nebraska) is a film and television producer, contemporary art curator, gallerist and musician.

== Musical career and festival management ==
Discovering bebop as a teenager and trained as a saxophonist, Newman attended Stanford University and Oberlin College, where he received his bachelor's degree in music in 1955. While at Oberlin he started a jazz club and was also a founding member, with Walter Hopps and Craig Kauffman, of Concerthall Workshop. In addition to his activities as a musician, Newman has had extensive experience as a jazz presenter, having staged numerous concerts at Oberlin and in Los Angeles, presenting such artists as Dave Brubeck, Teddy Charles, Count Basie, Chet Baker, Charles Mingus, Terry Gibbs, and Gerry Mulligan.

In 1978 Newman resumed active music making, studying flute performance. From 1982 to 2013 he held the baritone saxophone chair with the Junius Courtney big band in the San Francisco area. With filmmaker William Farley he produced a video documentary, In Between the Notes, on the life and career of master Indian vocalist Pandit Pran Nath, working closely with Pran Nath's disciples Terry Riley, La Monte Young and Marian Zazeela.

In 1992, along with Charles Amirkhanian, Newman co-founded the new music festival organization Other Minds, based in San Francisco. He designed its website from 1995 until 2005 as well as its concert programs and CDs. He served as President of Other Minds (formerly the California College of Performing Arts) from 1992 to 2004. He resigned from the Other Minds Board in 2016. He currently curates a film series for the Upper Ashbury Cinema Club (UACC), a private, by invitation, group of film lovers.

== Gallery management and curating ==
Jim Newman co-founded Syndell Studio in the Brentwood area of Los Angeles in 1955, with Ben and Betty Bartosh, Walter Hopps and Craig Kauffman. In that same year they presented "Action I," the first major survey of California abstract expressionist painting, at the Santa Monica Pier merry-go-round.

In 1956 he moved to San Francisco where he co-founded the Dilexi Gallery with Robert Alexander in 1958 and directed its operations until it closed in 1969. Exhibitors at the gallery included: Alan Lynch, Jeremy Anderson, Hassel Smith, Alvin Light, Leslie Kerr, Craig Kauffman, Irving Petlin, Deborah Remington, Jay DeFeo, Roy De Forest, Ed Moses, H.C. Westermann, Jess (1958), Sidney Gordin, Gary Molitor, Ron Nagle, Richard Shaw (artist), Robert Morris (artist), Joe Goode (1962) and Charles Ross.

In 1993 Newman began a collaboration with conceptual artist Lowell Darling on a project called Hollywood Archaeology. They began making Cibachrome prints of discarded movie film found by Darling in the streets and dumpsters of Hollywood in the early '70s. More recently the project has expanded and found a home on the World Wide Web, under the sponsorship of the Whitney Museum of American Art.

== Film and television production ==
In his capacity as a film and television producer, Newman worked with KQED-TV on production of the Dilexi Series, featuring twelve original TV programs by artists including Terry Riley, Arlo Acton, Anna Halprin, Yvonne Rainer, Robert Nelson, Frank Zappa, Andy Warhol, The Living Theater, Philip Makanna, Robert Frank, Edwin Schlossberg, Walter De Maria, and Ken Dewey. From 1971 to 1974 he produced two feature films, Phil Makanna's Shoot the Whale and Space Is the Place, featuring jazz bandleader Sun Ra. In 1976 he produced a video documentary on Philippine psychic surgery, Miracles and Metaphors.

== Arts Projects from the 1980s, 1990s and 2000-2021 ==
In 2017 Newman began collaborating with curator and art historian Laura Whitcomb in a series of projects documenting his career in the arts. In November 2021 Whitcomb authored and published a book titled DILEXI: a Gallery & Beyond. It covers the entire history of Dilexi Gallery and other projects, including the Dilexi TV series of artist commissions, films Newman produced, including Shoot the Whale and Space is the Place, his documentary In Between the Notes on the Indian classical vocalist Pandit Pran Nath, and the new music festival Other Minds, which Newman co-founded with Charles Amirkhanian.
