= Henry Brant =

American classical composer

- Born: September 15, 1913; Montreal, Quebec, Canada
- Died: April 26, 2008 (aged 94); Santa Barbara, California, United States
- Occupations: Composer, orchestrator, instrumentalist

Henry Dreyfuss Brant (September 15, 1913 – April 26, 2008) was a Canadian-born American composer. An expert orchestrator with a flair for experimentation, many of Brant's works featured spatialization techniques.

== Biography ==
Brant was born in Montreal, to American parents (his father was a violinist), in 1913. Something of a child prodigy, he began composing at the age of eight, and studied first at the McGill Conservatorium (1926–29) and then in New York City (1929–34). He played violin, flute, tin whistle, piano, organ, and percussion at a professional level and was fluent with the playing techniques for all of the standard orchestral instruments.

As a 19-year-old, Brant was the youngest composer included in Henry Cowell's landmark book from 1933, American Composers on American Music; and Cowell realized that Brant had already demonstrated an early identification with the American experimental musical tradition. He was represented in Cowell's anthology by an essay on oblique harmony, an idea which presaged some of the techniques used in his mature spatial compositions.

Thereafter Brant composed, orchestrated, and conducted for radio, film, ballet, and jazz groups. The stylistic diversity of these early professional experiences would also eventually contribute to the manner of his mature output. Starting in the late 1940s, he taught at Columbia University, the Juilliard School and, for 24 years, Bennington College. His students included American composer Patsy Rogers.

During the mid-1950s Brant came to the conclusion that (as he himself put it) "single-style music … could no longer evoke the new stresses, layered insanities, and multi-directional assaults of contemporary life on the spirit." In pursuit of an optimal framework for the presentation of a music which embraced such a simultaneity of musical textures and styles, Brant made a series of experiments and compositions exploring the potential for the physical position of sounds in space to be used as an essential compositional element.

As well as producing works for the concert hall, Brant worked as an orchestrator for many Hollywood productions, including the Elizabeth Taylor movie Cleopatra (1963), one of many collaborations with composer Alex North. Brant helped with the orchestration of North's score for 2001, and due to North's stress-induced muscle spasms, Brant had to conduct the recording session for the film score. Other composers whom he assisted as orchestrator included Virgil Thomson, Aaron Copland, George Antheil, Douglas Moore, and Gordon Parks. Brant's work as an orchestrator was not limited to film and stage: his long-term affinity for the music of Charles Ives — whose The Unanswered Question was an acknowledged inspiration for Brant's spatial music — was ultimately found in the premiere of Brant's arrangement of Ives' Second Piano Sonata, "Concord, Mass 1840–60" as A Concord Symphony in 1996. A Concord Symphony was recorded by the San Francisco Symphony on its SFS Media label.

From 1981, Brant made his home in Santa Barbara, California. There he died on April 26, 2008, at the age of 94.

== Music ==
Beginning with the 1953 score Rural Antiphonies (predating Stockhausen's Gruppen of 1955–57 but coming thirty-five years after Charles Ives's Fourth Symphony of 1912–18 and Rued Langgaard's Music of the Spheres of 1916–18), Brant developed the concept of spatial music, in which the location of instruments and/or voices in physical space is a significant compositional element. He identified the origins of the concept in the antiphonal music of the late renaissance and early baroque, in the antiphonal use of four brass ensembles placed in the corners of the stage in the Requiem of Hector Berlioz and, most importantly, in works of Charles Ives, in particular The Unanswered Question. Henry Brant was America's foremost composer of acoustic spatial music. The planned positioning of performers throughout the hall, as well as on stage, was an essential factor in his composing scheme and a point of departure for a radically expanded range and intensity of musical expression. Brant's mastery of spatial composing technique enabled him to write textures of unprecedented polyphonic and/or polystylistic complexity while providing maximum resonance in the hall and increased clarity of musical detail for the listener. His catalogue comprises over 100 spatial works.

In keeping with Brant's belief that music can be as complex and contradictory as everyday life, his larger works often employ multiple, contrasting performing forces, as in Meteor Farm (1982) for symphony orchestra, large jazz band, two choruses, West African drum ensemble and chorus, South Indian soloists, large Javanese Gamelan ensemble, percussion orchestra and two Western solo sopranos. Brant's spatial experiments convinced him that space exerts specific influences on harmony, polyphony, texture and timbre. He regarded space as music's "fourth dimension," (after pitch, time and timbre). Brant experimented with new combinations of acoustic timbres, even creating entire works for instrumental family groups of a single timbre: Orbits for 80 trombones, organ and sopranino voice, Ghosts & Gargoyles for 9 flutes, and others for multiple trumpets and guitars. This predilection for ensembles of a single tone quality dates from Angels and Devils (1932) for an ensemble of 11 flutes. His experimentation was not always successful however. His 1972 piece Immortal Combat staged outside Lincoln Center was drowned out by traffic noise and a thunderstorm. With the exception of pieces composed for recorded media (in which he used over-dubbing or acoustical sound sources), Brant did not use electronic materials or permit amplification in his music.

He is perhaps best known for his compositions Verticals Ascending (conceptually based on the architecture of the Watts Towers in Los Angeles) and Horizontals Extending. A "spatial opera", The Grand Universal Circus (Libretto: Patricia Gorman Brant) was premiered in 1956. Brant won the Pulitzer Prize for Music in 2002 for his composition Ice Field. In addition to composing, he played the violin, flute, tin whistle, percussion, piano, and organ and frequently included soloistic parts in his large works for himself to play.

Later premieres included Wind, Water, Clouds & Fire, for 4 choirs and instrumentalists, commissioned by Present Music and premiered on November 19, 2004, at The Cathedral of St. John the Evangelist, Milwaukee, Wisconsin. Tremors, for 4 singers and 16 instrumentalists, commissioned by the Getty Research Institute, premiered on June 4, 2004, at the Getty Center in Los Angeles. Tremors was repeated in a Green Umbrella concert at LA's Walt Disney Concert Hall on November 1, 2004. Ghosts & Gargoyles, a concerto for flute solo with flute orchestra, for New Music Concerts, Toronto had its premiere on May 26, 2002. Ice Field, for large orchestral groups and organ, was commissioned by Other Minds for a December 2001 premiere by the San Francisco Symphony.

Brant's handbook for orchestration, Textures and Timbres, was published posthumously.

=== Orchestra/chamber orchestra ===
- An Adventure
- Ballad (The Half Songs)
- Decision
- Dedication in Memory of a Great Man
- Downtown Suite
- Symphony in B-flat (The Nineteen-Thirties)
- Symphony No. 2 (Promised Land)
- Variations on a Canadian Theme
- Whoopee in D (1972)
- Whoopee in D major: (Overture for a Fine Orchestra)

=== Solo instrument with orchestra/chamber orchestra ===
- Concerto for Clarinet and Orchestra
- Concerto for Saxophone and Orchestra
- Fantasy and Caprice, for violin and orchestra
- Concerto for Alto Sax and Orchestra (1941)
- Concerto for Alto Saxophone Solo Or Trumpet Solo (1996)

=== String orchestra ===
- Saraband
- Two Choral Preludes
- Two Lyric Interludes

=== Band/wind ensemble ===
- Millennium I
- Signs and Alarms
- Street Music (Three Places in Montreal)
- Whoopee in D major

=== Solo instrument with band/wind ensemble ===
- Concerto for Alto Sax or Trumpet with Nine Instruments
- Concerto for Clarinet and Dance (Jazz) Orchestra
- Statesmen in Jazz: Three Portraits

=== Solo instrument with chamber ensemble ===
- Violin Concerto with Lights

=== Vocal quartet with chamber ensemble ===
- Four Skeleton Pieces
- The Scientific Creation of the World

=== Chamber music ===
==== With soloist ====
- Divinity, with solo harpsichord
- Feuerwerk, with solo female speaker
- Newsflash, with narrator
- Piri

==== Two instruments ====
- Ballad, for violin and piano
- Duo, for cello and piano
- Partita, for flute and piano
- Two Rush Hours in Manhattan, for violin and piano

==== Three instruments ====
- Ice Age, for clarinet, glockenspiel, and piano (1954)
- Imaginary Ballet, for piccolo, cello, and piano
- Music for a Five and Dime
- Strength through Joy in Dresden: Introduction and Coda to a Theater Piece

==== Four instruments ====
- Conversations in an Unknown Tongue
- Four Mountains in the Amstel
- Fourscore
- From Bach's Menagerie
- Funeral Music for the Mass Dead
- Galaxy I
- Handorgan Music (1933 Version)
- Handorgan Music (1984 Version)
- A Requiem in Summer
- Variations on a Theme by Robert Schumann

==== Five to nine instruments ====
- All Souls Carnival
- American Commencement
- Aria with Thirty Variations
- Galaxy II
- Hieroglyphics II
- Kitchen Music
- The Marx Brothers
- A Requiem in Summer
- Stresses

=== Percussion ensemble ===
- Origins (Symphony for Percussion)

=== A cappella chorus ===
- December Madrigal
- Peace Music for U.N. Day
- The Three-Way Canon Blues

=== Two pianos ===
- Four Choral Preludes
- Toccata on "Wachet Auf"

=== Solo instrument ===
- The Big Haul, for cello
- Confusion in the Salon, for piano
- Country Tunes in Jazz, for piano
- Four Traumatics, for piano
- Mobiles 1, for flute
- Oases, for cello
- Two Conclusions, for piano
- Two Sarabandes, for keyboard instrument

=== Spatial works ===
- Orbits: A Spatial Symphonic Ritual (for 80 trombones, organ and sopranino voice) (1979)
- Autumn Hurricanes, A Spatial Cantata for Widely Separated Vocal and Instrumental Groups (1986)

==== Orchestra/chamber orchestra ====
- Antiphony I
- Antiphony I (chamber version)
- Antiphony One
- Curriculum ll: Spatial Tone Poem
- Desert Forests (2000)
- Ice Field
- On the Nature of Things (1956)
- Plowshares and Swords
- Prisons of the Mind
- Trinity of Spheres

== Awards ==
A member of the American Academy of Arts and Letters, Brant was awarded the 2002 Pulitzer Prize in Music for Ice Field (2001), commissioned by Other Minds and premiered by the San Francisco Symphony under the direction of Michael Tilson Thomas. He received two Guggenheim Fellowships, in 1946 and 1955, and was the first American composer to win the Prix Italia. Among other honors were Ford Foundation, Fromm Foundation, National Endowment for the Arts and Koussevitzky awards and the American Music Center's Letter of Distinction. In conjunction with Brant's 85th birthday concert, Wesleyan University conferred upon him the honorary degree of Doctor of Fine Arts (1998). The Paul Sacher Foundation in Basel acquired Brant's complete archive of original manuscripts, including over 300 works, in 1998.
