= Jeanne Stark-Iochmans =

- Born: Belgium
- Genres: Classical
- Instrument: Piano

Jeanne Stark-Iochmans was a Belgian classical pianist.

== Early life ==
Stark-Iochmans was born in Belgium and graduated from the Royal Conservatory of Brussels with the highest marks in the previous twenty years. She was awarded le Prix de Virtuosité a l'unanimité avec Grande Distinction and a gold medal from the Belgian government.

She won the Laure Van Cutsem prize, appeared as soloist with her country's national orchestra, and was selected to represent Belgium at an international festival of modern music in Bayreuth, Germany. An International Queen Elizabeth Competition scholarship brought Jeanne Stark-Iochmans to the United States for a period of advanced study with Mieczysław Horszowski and Edwine Behre.

== Professional career ==
Following a highly acclaimed debut at Carnegie Recital Hall, Stark-Iochmans has performed in France, Canada, Mexico, Belgium and the United States. She gave solo performances in venues from San Francisco's Masonic Auditorium and Herbst Theater to New York's Carnegie Recital Hall and Alice Tully Hall at Lincoln Center. She was featured as a soloist with the Belgian National Orchestra under the direction of Léon Jongen and Edouard van Remoortel, the National Radio Orchestra of Belgium conducted by René Defossez, the New Haven Symphony, the Boston Civic Orchestra, and the Berkeley Symphony conducted by Kent Nagano.

For more than fifteen years, Stark-Iochmans was featured in the Distinguished Artists concert series of Today's Artists and Four Seasons Concerts. They presented her in major venues nationally and as a performer and lecturer during their music festival in Yachats, Oregon. Stark-Iochmans also taught and performed at the Montauroux summer music festival in southern France. She served as a faculty member of the Adamant Music School in Vermont, as well as serving as a guest lecturer at Bryn Mawr College on the works of Olivier Messiaen.

Jeanne Stark-Iochmans was esteemed, in Europe and in America, for her musicianship and interpretations of classical music's most challenging repertoire for the piano. Her artistry earned her the praise of composers Darius Milhaud, Olivier Messiaen and Lou Harrison.

== Reviews ==
Reviews on the music of:

Ludwig van Beethoven "Each note is a jewel chiseled with perfect mastery and emotion." Le Parisien

Claude Debussy "Portrays the music ideally." Los Angeles Times

Frédéric Chopin "Her felicitous touch and mastery brought...infinite coloristic possibilities." Le Parisien

Wolfgang Amadeus Mozart "Stark-Iochmans' performance was so moving as to be a spiritual comment on the composer's life." San Francisco Chronicle

Johannes Brahms "..We gave one of those deeply moving profound concerts and the vehicle was Johannes Brahms and your wonderful, playing." Kent Nagano, Conductor

Olivier Messiaen "Revelatory" New York Times

Jeanne Stark-Iochmans can be heard on Arch Records' label with Debussy's Preludes, Books I and II. Her CD recordings include Bach's Goldberg Variations; Beethoven's Last Three Sonatas, Op. 109, 110 and 111; and Debussy's Etudes and Preludes, Book II.

== Death ==
She died on 30 September 2020, aged 94.
