= Michael Harrison (musician) =

American classical composer (1958-2026)

Michael Harrison (October 24, 1958 – April 17, 2026) was an American contemporary classical music composer and pianist who lived in New York City.

== Early years ==
Born in Bryn Mawr, Pennsylvania, Harrison grew up in Eugene, Oregon, where his father, David Kent Harrison was a professor of mathematics at the University of Oregon and a Guggenheim Fellow for the academic year 1963–1964. As a child and teenager, he spent summers in both Chatham and Concord, Massachusetts, with his grandfather, George R. Harrison, a professor of experimental physics at the Massachusetts Institute of Technology (1930), and Dean of Science (1942–64). He graduated from the University of Oregon with a B.M. in Composition, where he later received the Distinguished Alumnus of the Year Award, and then moved to New York City to study with La Monte Young through a Dia Art Foundation Apprenticeship-in Residency. He later received an M.M. in composition from the Manhattan School of Music, studying with Reiko Fueting.

== Career ==
In 1986, Harrison designed and produced the "harmonic piano", an extensively modified grand piano with the ability to play 24 notes per octave. Critic Kyle Gann referred to it as "an indisputable landmark in the history of Western tuning". The instrument is described in the second edition of the Grove Dictionary of Musical Instruments.

Harrison had been a serious student of Indian music, first as a disciple of master Indian vocalist Pandit Pran Nath (1979–1996), and then a protégé of Ustad Mashkoor Ali Khan (1999–2026). He was also the co-founder and president of the American Academy of Indian Classical Music (AAICM).

Harrison was a protege of minimalist composer, La Monte Young, serving as Young's exclusive tuner for The Well Tuned Piano, a semi-improvised several hour long piano piece, learning the piece by sitting at the piano with Young every time he played it. He became the only person to ever play the piece other than the composer.

== Later life and death ==
Harrison died on April 17, 2026, at the age of 67.

== Academic appointments ==
Harrison had been on faculty at the Rhode Island School of Design, Manhattan School of Music’s Contemporary Performance Program, and the Bang on a Can Summer Institute at MASS MoCA. He was music director at Arts, Letters & Numbers. He was a Guggenheim Fellow for the academic year 2018–2019.

== Discography ==
- 2026 Evening Light: Raga Cycle I (Cantaloupe Music 21221)
- 2022 Christina Vantzou, Michael Harrison, and John Also Bennett (Séance Centre, 2LP)
- 2021 Seven Sacred Names (Cantaloupe Music 21157)
- 2020 Just Constellations, Roomful of Teeth (New Amsterdam Records)
- 2018 For this from that will be filled, Clarice Jensen (Miasmah Recordings 041)
- 2017 Histories, Sophia Subbayya Vastek (Innova Recordings 974)
- 2016 Harmonic Constellations, Mari Kimura (New World Records 80776–2)
- 2012 Time Loops with cellist Maya Beiser (Cantaloupe Music 21086)
- 2012 Rumi: Lovedrunk (remastered)
- 2009 The Harmonic Series – A Compilation of Works in Just Intonation (Important Records 272)
- 2007 Revelation: Music in Pure Intonation (Cantaloupe Music 21043)
- 2001 Windham Hill 25 Years of Piano (Windham Hill Records)
- 1992 From Ancient Worlds (New Albion Records 042)
- 1987 In Flight (Fortuna Records 17042–2)
- 1985 Windham Hill Records Piano Sampler (WH 1040)

== Compositions ==
- Passage Installation with nine hours of music in 6-channel surround sound, composed and recorded with Elliot Cole, Ina Filip, Benoit Rolland, and lighting by Nina Elder, commissioned by Turchin Center for the Visual Arts, Boone, NC, 2023
- A New Well commissioned and premiered by Young People's Chorus of New York City, Francisco Núñez, director, 2021
- Time Cycles commissioned and premiered by Alarm Will Sound, Alan Pierson, conductor, Sheldon Hall, St. Louis, MO, 2019
- Mureed for string quartet (commissioned and premiered by Del Sol Quartet, Pacific Pythagorean Music Festival), 2019
- Tone Rooms installation with media artist Jonathan Turner, McColl Center for Art + Innovation, 2019
- Constitution, versions for string quartet, cello and piano, violin and piano, clarinet and piano, and solo piano (premiere: Bechtler Museum of Modern Art), 2019
- Just Ancient Loops (cello octet) commissioned and premiered by Cello Octet Amsterdam, Singelkerk, Amsterdam, the Netherlands, 2018
- Cello Constellations for cello with 21 pre-recorded cello tracks and electronics (commissioned and premiered by Clarice Jensen, The Kitchen), 2017
- Bairagi Bhairav for just intonation piano, Indian vocals, tabla, and optional tanpura (premiere: Carnegie Hill Concerts, Church of Advent Hope), 2017
- Harmonic Constellations for violin with 13 pre-recorded violin tracks and electronics (commissioned and premiered by Mari Kimura, National Sawdust), 2016
- Chorale (from Just Ancient Loops) for string orchestra (premiere: String Orchestra of Brooklyn, Roulette), 2016
- Malkauns: Polyphonic Alap for Indian vocalist and pre-recorded media (commissioned by Payton MacDonald for the Sonic Divide Project and Film), 2016
- Hijaz Prelude for piano with optional tabla and tanpura (premiere: Sophia Vastek, Nitin Mitta and Michael Harrison, Queens New Music Festival), 2016
- Kind of Glass for piano (premiere: Michael Harrison, Queens New Music Festival), 2016
- Tarana for male Indian vocalist, soprano, piano, tabla and optional tanpura, 2016
- Just Constellations for vocal octet (commissioned and premiered by Roomful of Teeth at MASS MoCA), 2015, revised 2016
- Radians Phase II for flute, clarinet, violin, cello and electronics (premiere: Third Sound, Havana Contemporary Music Festival), 2015
- Orchestral Modules for symphony orchestra (premiere: Manhattan School of Music Composers Orchestra), 2015
- Radians Phase for string quartet, two flutes and electronics (premiere: Tactus, Manhattan School of Music), 2015
- Jaunpuri (Rendition of a Raga) for piano, Indian vocals, tabla and tamboura (premiere: Kimball Gallagher, Mashkoor Ali Khan, Anirban Chowdhury, Michael Harrison; Carnegie Hall), 2015; version for cello, piano and tabla, 2014
- Yaman Alap for vocal octet (commissioned by Roomful of Teeth, (premiere: MASS MoCA), 2014
- Yaman Tarana for vocal octet (commissioned by Roomful of Teeth, (premiere: MASS MoCA), 2014
- Tessellations for chamber orchestra, countertenor, tenor, tabla and tamboura (premiere: Contemporaneous, Park Avenue Christian Church, NYC), 2014
- Orchestral Modules for chamber orchestra (premiere: Contemporaneous, Park Avenue Christian Church, NYC), 2014
- Piano Modules for duo piano (premiere: Allison Franzetti & Benita Meshulam) 2014; version for solo piano, 2012
- Harmonic Studies in Just Intonation for computer generated sine tones, 2014
- Raga Prelude No. 2 (Hijaz Bhairav) for cello and guitar (premiere: Ashley Bathgate and Mak Grgic), 2014; version for cello and piano (premiere: Maya Beiser and Michael Harrison, Atlas Center for Performing Arts), 2013
- Hijaz for SATB chorus, cello, piano, tabla & percussion (commissioned by Francisco Núñez, premiere: American Choral Director's Association Director's Choir, Florida Theatre), 2013
- Revelation Remix for electronics with prepared piano in just intonation, 2013
- Bhimpalasi (Rendition of a Raga) for Indian vocals, just intonation piano, cello, vibes, and tabla, 2013
- Just Ancient Loops for multi-track cellos with film by Bill Morrison (commissioned by MELA Foundation, premiere: Maya Beiser, Bang on a Can Marathon), 2012
- Chant for string quartet (premiere: JACK Quartet, Metropolitan Museum of Art), 2012
- Bragdon's Pavillion – multi media installation with artist Loris Greaud, Centre Pompidou, 2011
- Raga Prelude No. 1 (Yaman Kalyan) for cello and piano (premiere: Maya Beiser and Michael Harrison, Atlas Center for Performing Arts); versions for violin and piano; viola and piano, 2011
- Hijaz for youth or women's chorus, cello, piano, tabla & percussion (commissioned by Young People's Chorus of New York City, Francisco Núñez, director; premiere: Maya Beiser, Michael Harrison, Payton MacDonald; Kaufmann Concert Hall), 2011
- Tone Clouds for string quartet and just intonation piano (Revelation tuning) (premiere: Del Sol Quartet and Michael Harrison, Other Minds Festival), 2009
- Revelation: Music in Pure Intonation for just intonation piano (Revelation tuning) (premiere: Michael Harrison, Klavier-Festival Ruhr), completed 2007
- Wedding Song for voice and piano (premiere: Theo Bleckmann and Joshua Pierce), 2004
- From Ancient Worlds for just intonation piano ("From Ancient Worlds" tuning) (premiere: Michael Harrison, Quattro Pianoforti Festival, Rome), 1992, revised 1999
- Blue Camel for piano (premiere: Michael Harrison, Quattro Pianoforti Festival, Rome), 1999
- For My Father for flute, violin, cello and piano, 1994
- Song of the Rose for cello and piano, 1993
- Symphonic Cortege for symphony orchestra (premiere: Eugene Symphony Orchestra, Marin Alsop, conductor), 1990
- Birds of Paradise for jazz ensemble, 1990
- 1001 Nights for jazz ensemble, 1990
- African Child for world music ensemble, 1988
- Tactus for trumpet, piano and percussion, 1984–85
- In Flight for piano, 1984
- The Swan Has Flown to the Mountain Lake for flute, harp and cello, 1984; version for piano, 1983
- Ecstatic poems of Rumi for soprano and piano, 1983–84
- For Oboe for oboe, 1983
- Reminiscent Dances for string Orchestra, 1982
- Choral Work No. 1 for vocal quintet, 1981
- Choral Work No. 2 for vocal quintet, 1981
- Crystal Kyrie for two sopranos and 13 tuned crystal goblets (premiere: American Festival of Microtonal Music), 1979
- Zikr for SATB chorus with soprano soloist, 1979
- Atlantis for flute, clarinet, piano and tabla, 1979
- Call of the Beloved for soprano, flute, harp and piano, 1979
- Dance of the Sorcerers for flute, cello, piano, tabla and tamboura, 1978
- Sonnet XVIII for alto and piano, 1977
