= Spellling & the Mystery School =

Studio album (re-recorded) by Spellling
- Released: August 25, 2023
- Studio: Tiny Telephone, San Francisco
- Length: 51:00
- Label: Sacred Bones
- Producer: Spellling

Spellling chronology
| The Turning Wheel (2021) | Spellling & the Mystery School (2023) | Portrait of My Heart (2025) |

Singles from Spellling & the Mystery School
- 1. "Cherry / Under the Sun" Released: July 11, 2023; 2. "Hard to Please (Reprise)" Released: August 2, 2023

Professional ratings
Aggregate scores
| Source | Rating |
|---|---|
| Metacritic | 81/100 |
Review scores
| Source | Rating |
| AllMusic | 4/5 stars |
| The Line of Best Fit | 8/10 |
| Paste | 8.5/10 |
| Pitchfork | 7.2/10 |
| Slant Magazine | 4/5 stars |

Spellling & the Mystery School ("Spellling" stylized in all caps) is the fourth studio album by American experimental pop musician Spellling. It was released on August 25, 2023, and contains re-recordings of various selected songs from all of her previous albums.

== Track listing ==
All tracks are written by Tia Cabral.

Spellling & the Mystery School track listing
| No. | Title | Originally from | Length |
|---|---|---|---|
| 1. | "Walk Up to Your House" | Pantheon of Me (2017) | 4:14 |
| 2. | "Under the Sun" | Mazy Fly (2019) | 4:57 |
| 3. | "They Start the Dance" | Pantheon of Me | 3:20 |
| 4. | "Cherry" | Pantheon of Me | 3:47 |
| 5. | "Haunted Water" | Mazy Fly | 4:30 |
| 6. | "Hard to Please (Reprise)" | Mazy Fly | 3:17 |
| 7. | "Phantom Farewell" | Pantheon of Me | 4:13 |
| 8. | "Boys at School" | The Turning Wheel (2021) | 8:01 |
| 9. | "Always" | The Turning Wheel | 5:34 |
| 10. | "Revolution" | The Turning Wheel | 5:23 |
| 11. | "Sweet Talk" | The Turning Wheel | 3:58 |
| Total length: | | | 51:15 |

== Personnel ==
Musicians

- Spellling – vocals, synthesizer
- Giulio Xavier Cetto – bass
- Wyatt Overson – guitar
- Patrick Shelley – percussion
- Jaren Feeley – piano
- Dharma Moon-Hunter – backing vocals
- Toya Willock – backing vocals
- Del Sol Quartet – strings
- Divya Farias – violin

Technical

- Spellling – production
- Joe Lambert – mastering
- Drew Vandenberg – mixing
- Maryam Qudus – engineering
- Nicole Rowe – engineering assistance
