= Steven Schick =

American musician

Steven Schick (born May 8, 1954) is a percussionist and conductor from the United States, specializing in contemporary classical music. He teaches at the University of California, San Diego and was the music director and conductor of the La Jolla Symphony Orchestra from 2007 to 2022.

In February 2011, Schick was named director of the San Francisco Contemporary Music Players. He replaces Maestro David Milnes, who stepped down in 2009.

In 2012, he became the first artist-in-residence with the International Contemporary Ensemble (ICE).
