= Anthony Fantano =

American music critic and YouTuber (born 1985)

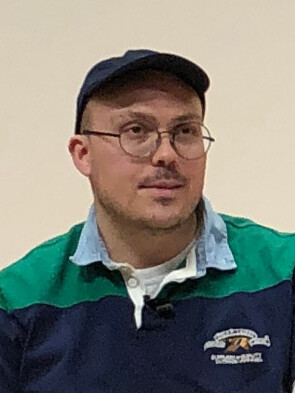
- Fantano in 2023
- Born: Anthony Nicholas Fantano; October 28, 1985 (age 41); Wolcott, Connecticut, U.S.
- Other names: Melon; Cal Chuchesta; The Internet's Busiest Music Nerd
- Education: Southern Connecticut State University
- Occupations: Music critic; YouTuber; streamer; influencer

YouTube information
- Channel: theneedledrop
- Genre: Music
- Subscribers: 3.09 million
- Views: 1.23 billion
- Last updated: August 17, 2026
- Website: theneedledrop.com

Anthony Nicholas Fantano (/fænˈtænoʊ/ fan-TAN-oh; born October 28, 1985) is an American music critic and internet personality who runs The Needle Drop, a YouTube channel with a tie-in website and Twitch streaming channel. Self-billed as "the internet's busiest music nerd", as a social media influencer Fantano discusses and reviews music from a variety of genres online. He also runs the channel Fantano where he talks about events in the music industry solo or with guests and conducts interviews.

== Early life ==
Anthony Nicholas Fantano was born on October 28, 1985, and was raised in Wolcott, Connecticut. As a teenager, he became interested in politics through the work of the musician Jello Biafra, former lead singer of the punk band Dead Kennedys, calling him "pretty much [his] political idol". Fantano graduated from Southern Connecticut State University in 2008, earning a liberal arts degree concentrated in journalism, communications, and political science.

== Career ==
Fantano started his career in the mid-2000s as a music director for the Southern Connecticut State University college radio station.

=== The Needle Drop ===
Fantano's setup for his review (2016)

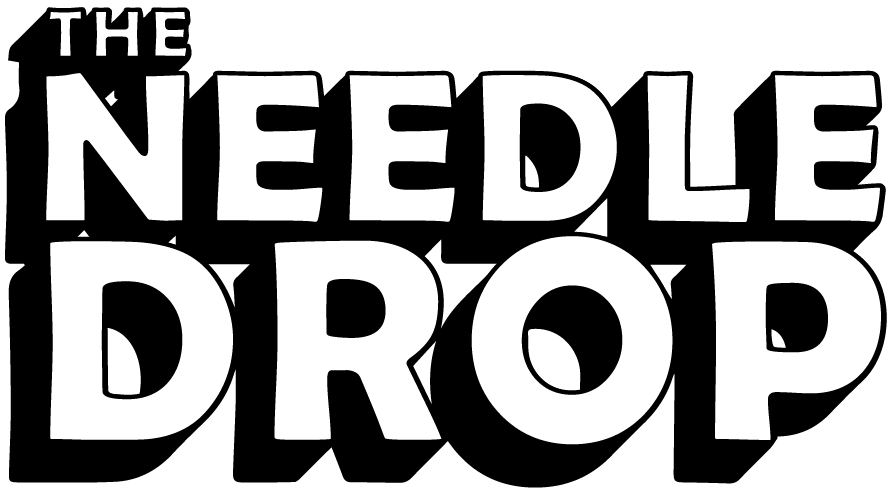
Logo used for the web series

In 2007, Fantano started working at Connecticut Public Radio (WNPR), where he hosted The Needle Drop. That same year, he launched The Needle Drop in the form of written reviews, eventually launching his series of video reviews on the YouTube channel of the same name in January 2009, starting with a Jay Reatard record. In 2010, Fantano removed older reviews that contained music clips in order to avoid violations of the Digital Millennium Copyright Act. At the time, he was working on The Needle Drop at his college radio station, as well as at a pizza restaurant. In late 2011, he decided to pursue The Needle Drop full-time, but kept affiliation with WNPR until 2014. Fantano was offered an album review show on Adult Swim but declined. By the end of 2017, Fantano had reached a million subscribers and diversified his content to include weekly "track roundup" videos, livestreamed Q&As, and video think-pieces alongside his album reviews. To earn enough money to pay his editor Austen Walsh, by November 2016, Fantano was recording more regularly on a secondary YouTube channel, "thatistheplan", on which he reviewed memes and recorded "often irreverent videos that don't fall into the record review format", according to Spin. Outside of the YouTube channel, The Needle Drop also has a tie-in website and Twitch streaming channel.

In October 2017, an article by Ezra Marcus in The Fader accused Fantano of promoting alt-right and anti-semitic sentiments in videos on his meme channel, "thatistheplan". Marcus criticized Fantano for the use of Pepe memes (which had recently been labeled an alt-right symbol by the Anti-Defamation League) and targeting feminists. After the article was released, multiple scheduled dates of The Needle Drop U.S. tour were canceled, with at least one ticket booking site for a Brooklyn tour date stating that their cancellation was due to the Fader article. Fantano produced a video response calling the article a "dumbass hit job". He disputed accusations of sympathizing with the alt-right and stated that the videos in question were satirical and that he was not a conservative. The article was deleted by The Fader in March 2018, with both parties saying that the claims were settled. In a later interview by The New York Times, Fantano acknowledged that there had been some "grubby, closed-minded, young, aggressive male" viewers on the "thatistheplan" channel and stating that the incident had led him to be more vocal in his advocacy for social justice issues.

Fantano garnered attention for his video on Kanye West and Ty Dolla Sign's album Vultures 1 in February 2024 titled "unreviewable 1". Declaring the record "unreviewable trash," he talked about West's antisemitic views, particularly those expressed in his music, and general attitude preventing him from fully critiquing the record; he also delved into discourse regarding West's fan base being generally hostile to criticism and negative reviews. The video subsequently received backlash from West's fans on social media.

=== Albums rating scale ===
Outside the standard zero to ten rating scale, Fantano will also occasionally give a score outside of the standard scale, such as NOT GOOD (pictured).

Albums are rated on a standard zero to ten scale, with Fantano deeming an album score of a five as "indifference", with scores above a five as him enjoying the record to varying degrees, and below five mostly disliking it. There are also additional qualifiers ("light", "decent", or "strong") with each number besides ten and typically zero. Fantano will also occasionally give a score outside of the standard scale, such as "NOT GOOD" for albums he deems unworthy of reviewing in full, believing the album to simply be "not good". Rarely, he gives unique scores to specific albums such as "NOT BAD" for The Future Bites by Steven Wilson and xperiment by Ken Carson, highlighting his exceeded expectations, and "NOT MUSIC" for Starface by Tyga, criticizing the album's use of artificial intelligence. Fantano also uses the color of his flannel to show his rating, such as the red flannel for bad albums and a yellow/golden one for great albums.

==== Albums rated 10 on release ====
Artist	Title	Year	Ref.
Death Grips	The Money Store	2012	
Swans	To Be Kind	2014	
Kendrick Lamar	To Pimp a Butterfly	2015	
Kids See Ghosts	Kids See Ghosts	2018	
Daughters	You Won't Get What You Want	2018	
Spellling	The Turning Wheel	2021	
Lingua Ignota	Sinner Get Ready	2021	
Charli XCX	Brat	2024	
Clipse	Let God Sort Em Out	2025	

==== Albums rated 0 on release ====
Artist	Title	Year	Ref.
Kid Cudi	Speedin' Bullet 2 Heaven	2015	
Chance the Rapper	The Big Day	2019	
Green Day	Father of All Motherfuckers	2020	
Tones and I	Welcome to the Madhouse	2021	
Ken Carson	X	2022	
MGK and Trippie Redd	Genre: Sadboy	2024	
Yuno Miles	Album	2025	(Note: The score and review are semi-satirical; Fantano features on the album.)
Avenged Sevenfold	Statica	2026	
Nine Vicious	Sedition	2026	

== Other ventures ==
=== Charity ===
In 2019, Fantano curated a charity compilation, The Needle Drop LP, which consists of tracks performed by "artists that have either been featured on the site or reviewed favorably in the past". Profits from the album were donated to The Immigrant Legal Resource Center non-profit.

=== Collaborations and media appearances ===
In July 2019, Fantano made a cameo appearance in Lil Nas X's animated music video for the Young Thug and Mason Ramsey remix of "Old Town Road", appearing as a security guard for the Area 51 military installation (a reference to the "Storm Area 51" meme).

In October 2025, Fantano collaborated with the American comedy rapper Yuno Miles on the song "Take Me Back", also appearing in its music video. Fantano made cameo appearances in the films Nirvanna the Band the Show the Movie (2025) and The Moment (2026). In the former film he discusses the (fictional) career of musician Jay McCarrol in a (fictional) episode of The Needle Drop.

=== A Perfect Interview ===
On November 10, 2026, Fantano announced the launch of A Perfect Interview, a long-form interview series created in collaboration with Talkhouse. Fantano co-developed the series with music journalists Emilie Friedlander and Drew Millard, who also serve as co-producers alongside Sam Blumenfeld.

== Feuds ==
=== Drake ===
On September 15, 2022, Fantano uploaded a video on his second channel jokingly claiming that Drake had sent private messages to him on Instagram, specifically recommending Fantano a vegan cookie recipe. In response, Drake posted his genuine messages to Fantano on Instagram Stories, which stated that Fantano's existence is a "light 1" and that the "1 is cause [he is] alive". Fantano later spoke about the exchange on an Instagram livestream, stating that the video was a "shitpost" and that he had no "hard feelings" toward Drake.

=== Halsey ===
On October 29, 2024, Fantano uploaded a review for Halsey's 2024 album The Great Impersonator which he awarded a 1 out of 10 and said that the album had "the worst case of 'main character syndrome' I've heard on any pop album in 2024". Halsey defended the album, stating it was inspired by her battle with cancer, writing on X, "Being a woman dealing with serious health issues often means being afraid of telling the truth about the pain you're in because you're afraid of not being believed or seeming attention seeking. He validated that fear to thousands of women." In 2026, Fantano responded on his YouTube page doubling down on his review, explaining that his criticisms were targeted towards the album's music instead of her personal struggles.

=== Julian Casablancas ===
In a 2024 podcast with The Gatekeepers, The Strokes lead vocalist Julian Casablancas criticized Fantano, saying, "He should stick to analysis when he's methodically and scientifically describing things. He does a good job of like, 'he used this studio and did this.' So he's good at that. When it comes to art taste, he's trash and knows nothing." In 2026, Casablancas referenced Fantano in the song "Lonely in the Future" from the Strokes album Reality Awaits. He was later included in the song's music video, portrayed as a puppet critiquing Johann Sebastian Bach.

== Public image ==
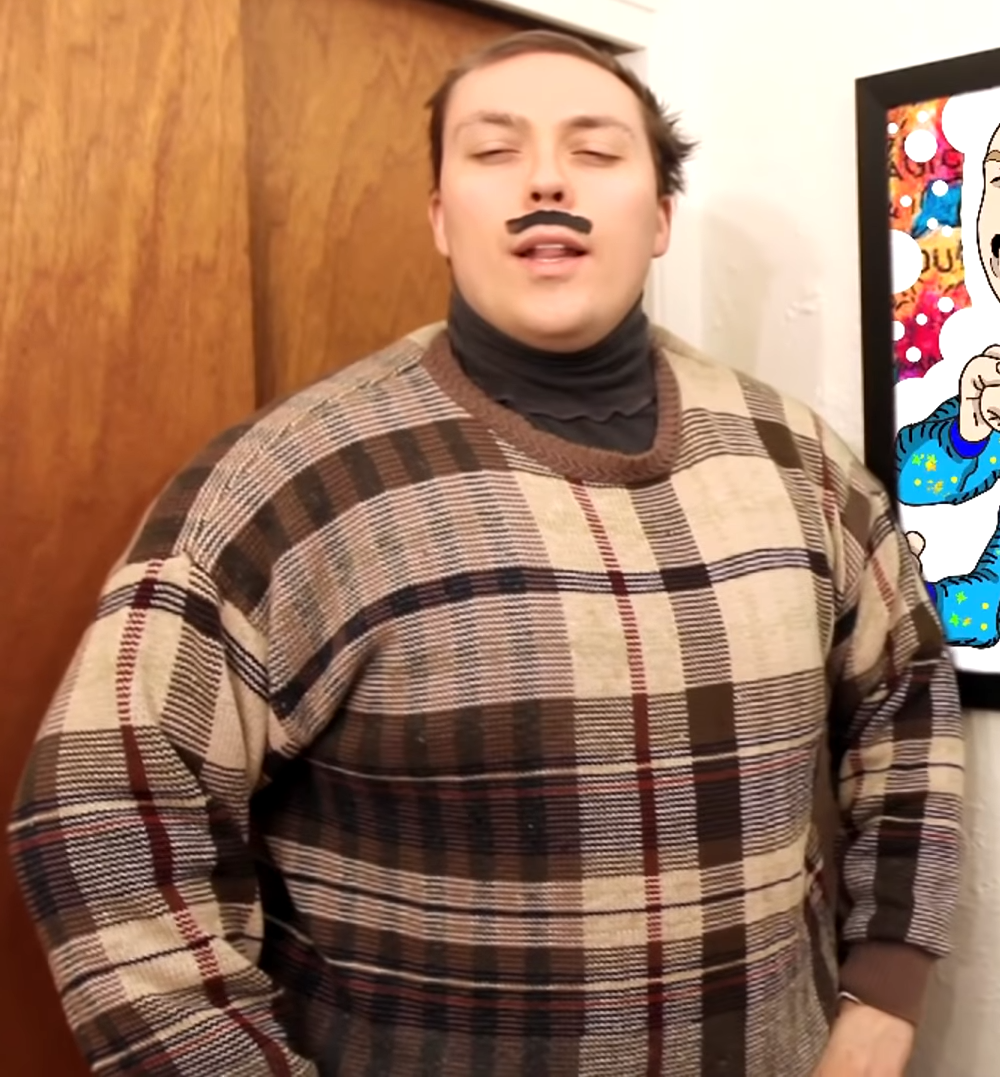
Fantano as his alter-ego, "Cal Chuchesta"

The Needle Drop won the 2011 O Music Awards in the "Beyond the Blog" category. Rolling Stone included Fantano in their list of the 25 most influential content creators of 2024. On Complex's "Hip-Hop Media Power Ranking: The 2026 Edition", Fantano was ranked at #6 out of #25. In 2014, Nick Veronin of Wired said of Fantano: "Instead of deploying ten-dollar words to describe a riff or synth tone, Fantano relies on gestures, clenching his fists or contorting his elastic, expressive face. It gets at some of the more ephemeral qualities of music that written words can't begin to touch".

When asked about the merits of Fantano's reviews, veteran music critic Robert Christgau said in 2019:

[Fantano] seems to have arrived at a plausible brand of 21st-century rockcrit taste that runs toward what I'll call dark prog [...] Nowhere near as insensible to hip-hop/r&b as dark proggers tend to be, but note that very few female artists crack his top 10s, which in 2018 was really missing the action. Fantano seems to have figured out a way to make some kind of living by disseminating his own criticism in the online age.

In his 2019 book Perfect Sound Whatever, comedian James Acaster called Fantano's best albums of 2016 list "a real music fan's Top 50" and said of Fantano: "Perhaps more than anybody else, he appreciates how the reviewer's role has changed since the internet became a thing [...] The job of a reviewer used to be telling people what's worth their money but now it's telling people what's worth their time." In September 2020, New York Times culture correspondent Joe Coscarelli described Fantano as "probably the most popular music critic left standing". According to Coscarelli, Fantano has successfully brought an "old art to a new medium" and has revitalized the record review format for a younger generation of music consumers. Writing for The New Yorker in 2025, Kelefa Sanneh described Fantano as "the most critical major music critic of the current era" at a time when music critics rarely gave negative reviews, and his taste was "fond of noisy rock and feisty hip-hop, and deeply skeptical of the contemporary music industry".

== Personal life ==
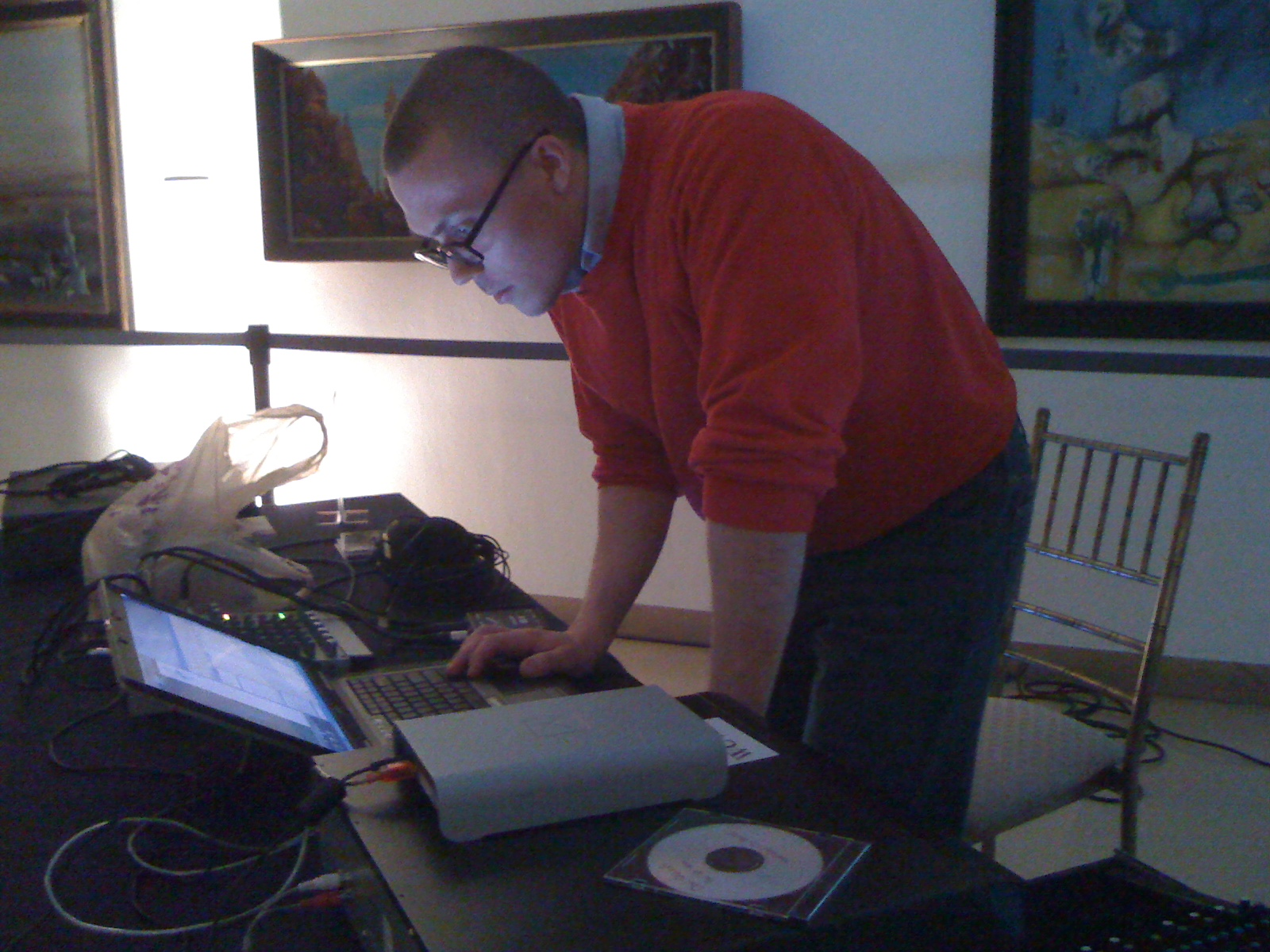
Fantano in 2010

Fantano resides in Connecticut. He is a vegan, having swapped after initially going vegetarian in his late teens. In March 2018, Fantano told Polygon that he is a "free speech purist". He identifies as a leftist, endorsed Bernie Sanders in the 2020 United States presidential election, supports Zohran Mamdani, and has accused Israel of committing genocide in the Gaza Strip.

=== Legal disputes ===
On July 24, 2023, Fantano was named as a defendant in a lawsuit from video game developer Activision over a viral audio clip he had recorded on TikTok about pizza slices. Activision claimed that Fantano had asked for "substantial monetary damages" for the company's use of the audio in an advertisement for custom Crash Bandicoot trainers, or to be "prepared to defend a lawsuit". On August 10, Activision dropped the lawsuit with prejudice, meaning it could not be refiled.

Falling in Reverse frontman Ronnie Radke filed a defamation lawsuit against Fantano on August 20, 2024, claiming that the latter had "acted in malice" and "engaged in fraud" in posting commentary about the singer in a 2023 video titled "This Guy Sucks" about Radke's rape allegations. The case was dismissed on May 12, 2025, with Radke being ordered to pay Fantano's legal fees.
