= The Turning Wheel (album) =

Studio album by Spellling
- Released: June 25, 2021
- Genre: Art pop; chamber pop
- Length: 57:32
- Label: Sacred Bones
- Producer: Spellling

Spellling chronology
Mazy Fly (2019)	The Turning Wheel (2021)	Spellling & the Mystery School (2023)

Singles from The Turning Wheel
- 1. "Little Deer" Released: 2021; 2. "Boys at School" Released: 2021; 3. "Turning Wheel" Released: 2021

The Turning Wheel is the third studio album by American experimental pop artist Spellling, released on June 25, 2021, by Sacred Bones Records. The album received generally positive reviews from music critics.

== Composition ==
The Turning Wheel has been noted for fewer elements of dark wave and gothic and more of progressive pop compared to Mazy Fly, Spelling's previous release. For instance, album opener "Little Deer" pulls from jazz pop and "plush" 1960s lounge pop, while "Emperor with an Egg" takes on chamber pop.

The album itself is divided into two parts, subtitled Above and Below. Above, beginning with "Little Deer" and ending with "Emperor with an Egg", has an overall brighter sound while Below, beginning with "Boys at School", has a darker tone.

== Critical reception ==
Professional ratings
Aggregate scores
Source	Rating
AnyDecentMusic?	7.5/10
Metacritic	79/100
Review scores
Source	Rating
AllMusic	3.5/5 stars
Beats Per Minute	76%
The Line of Best Fit	9/10
Loud and Quiet	6/10
Louder Than War	4.5/5 stars
musicOMH	4/5 stars
NME	4/5 stars
Pitchfork	7.5/10
Uncut	7/10
Under the Radar	7.5/10 stars

The Turning Wheel was met with positive reviews from critics. At Metacritic, which assigns a normalized rating out of 100 to reviews from professional publications, the release received an average score of 79, based on nine reviews, indicating "generally favorable reviews". Aggregator AnyDecentMusic? gave the album a 7.5 out of 10, based on their assessment of the critical consensus. Online music critic Anthony Fantano gave the album a 10/10.

== Track listing ==
All songs written by Spellling.

Above

1. "Little Deer" – 5:39
2. "Always" – 5:14
3. "Turning Wheel" – 3:33
4. "The Future" – 3:27
5. "Awaken" – 4:31
6. "Emperor with an Egg" – 3:09

Below

7. "Boys at School" – 7:28
8. "Legacy" – 3:51
9. "Queen of Wands" – 5:21
10. "Magic Act" – 5:40
11. "Revolution" – 5:59
12. "Sweet Talk" – 3:33

== Personnel ==
Credits adapted from Tidal.

Musicians

- Noor Al-Samarrai – choir
- Rita Andrade – viola
- Monica Benson – flugelhorn, trumpet
- Calliope Brass Quintet – brass
- Ted Case – string arrangements
- Jennifer Hinkle – bass trombone
- Donia Jarrar – piano
- Milo Jimenez – acoustic guitar
- Nick Marchione – brass arrangement
- Sara Mayo – trombone
- Jinty McTavish – violin
- Dharma Mooney – choir
- Macgregor Munson – banjo
- Brijean Murphy – conga drum
- Erin Paul – horn
- Lidia Rodriguez – baritone saxophone
- Javier Santiago – piano
- Rebecca Steinberg – flugelhorn, trumpet
- Sabrina Tabby – violin
- Ezra Teshome – choir
- Carolyn Walter – bassoon, clarinet, bass clarinet
- Del Sol Quartet – strings

Technical

- Spellling – producer
- Drew Vandenberg – additional production, mixing
- Adrian Morgan – mastering
- Jonny Esser – mastering
- Mike Johnson – mastering
- Aleks Ozolins – engineer
- John Finkbeiner – engineer
