= Brooklyn Philharmonic =

Various American symphony orchestras

There have been several organizations referred to as the Brooklyn Philharmonic. The most recent was the now-defunct Brooklyn Philharmonic Symphony Orchestra, an American orchestra based in the New York City borough of Brooklyn, in existence from the 1950s until 2012. In its heyday it was called "groundbreaking" and "one of the most innovative and respected symphony orchestras of modern times".

== Organizations ==
Philharmonic Society of Brooklyn
- Orchestra
- Founded: 1857
- Disbanded: 1891 (sponsor until the 1980s)
- Location: Brooklyn, New York City, U.S.
- Concert hall: Brooklyn Academy of Music
- Principal conductor: Theodore Eisfeld (1857–1861); Theodore Thomas (1861–1891)

=== Philharmonic Society of Brooklyn ===
The Philharmonic Society of Brooklyn was formed in 1857 under Theodore Eisfeld, who served as its inaugural conductor until 1861. The Philharmonic Society of Brooklyn held concerts at the Athenaeum in Brooklyn Heights, then the largest concert venue in the borough, until it moved to the newly opened Brooklyn Academy of Music (BAM) in 1861, which the orchestra was a driving force in establishing, remaining there until 1891. In 1861, the orchestra was conducted once by Johann Strauss II, who is said to have impulsively snatched a violin from one of the other players to join in during "The Blue Danube".

After the departure of Eisfeld, Theodore Thomas served as conductor until 1891, a celebrated tenure. After the departure of Thomas, the Philharmonic Society of Brooklyn no longer sponsored its own orchestra, choosing instead to sponsor the Boston Symphony at BAM, which it did from 1891 onwards and from 1895 in conjunction with the Brooklyn Institute of Arts and Sciences. After the first BAM burned down on November 30, 1903, the Boston Symphony series was held at the Baptist Hall of the Pilgrim church until the new BAM opened in 1908. After 1938, the Philharmonic Society of Brooklyn was "almost nonexistent", and the Brooklyn Institute of Arts and Sciences continued to present the Boston Symphony by itself through the 1972–73 season, although the Philharmonic Society of Brooklyn continued to sponsor modest chamber music concerts at the BAM and elsewhere until the early 1980s.

=== Brooklyn Philharmonia ===
Between 1941 and 1943 a new orchestra was formed called the Brooklyn Symphony Orchestra, an offshoot of the earlier Brooklyn Civic Orchestra, but it was not able to sustain itself and expired after 1943.

=== Brooklyn Philharmonic ===
Brooklyn Philharmonic
- Orchestra
- Former name: Brooklyn Philharmonia
- Founded: 1954, by Julius Bloom
- Disbanded: 2013
- Later name: Brooklyn Philharmonic Orchestra
- Location: Brooklyn, New York City, U.S.
- Concert hall: Brooklyn Academy of Music
- Music director: Siegfried Landau (1955–1971); Lukas Foss (1971–1990); Dennis Russell Davies (1991–1996); Robert Spano (1996–2004); Michael Christie (2005–2010); Alan Pierson (2010–2013)

In 1954, the Director of BAM, Julius Bloom, led the incorporation of another new orchestra, also known as the "Brooklyn Philharmonia", in concert with the noted conductor Siegfried Landau and the arts impresario Marks Levin. Landau gave the orchestra a focus on contemporary and infrequently-performed classical music. In the late 1970s, the Brooklyn Philharmonia was one of seven subcontractors of the Cultural Council Foundation Artists Project, with 20 positions being funded by the federal government through the Comprehensive Employment and Training Act (CETA).

In 1982, the Brooklyn Philharmonia changed its name to the "Brooklyn Philharmonic Orchestra" while under the direction of American composer Lukas Foss, who was well-noted for his "Meet the Moderns" series, having received permission to adopt the name from the then still extant but much diminished Philharmonic Society of Brooklyn. Although it sometimes claimed to be "one of the oldest living orchestras in the New World", it had no organizational connection to the earlier Philharmonic Society of Brooklyn, with which it existed concurrently for almost thirty years.

Foss's successor, Dennis Russell Davies, expanded the orchestra's programming to encompass festival-themed weekend programs.

Robert Spano, the orchestra's next music director, was credited with markedly improving the sound of the group while continuing its focus on unique programming. Spano's successor, Michael Christie, added the concept of thematic programming to the orchestra's schedule. Christie's first Brooklyn Philharmonic concert as music director was in February 2006.

In 2007 and 2008, the orchestra performed with the Naumburg Orchestral Concerts, in the Naumburg Bandshell, Central Park, in the summer series.

In September 2007, the Brooklyn Philharmonic announced the extension of Christie's contract with the orchestra through the 2009–2010 season, with an evergreen clause to allow for yearly renewal. His contract with the Brooklyn Philharmonic expired in June 2010. According to one critic, "the orchestra saw its overall quality fall off drastically under music director Michael Christie." Faced with daunting deficits and declining subscribership, as well as with board retirements and resignations, the organization was forced to cancel the 2010–11 season entirely.

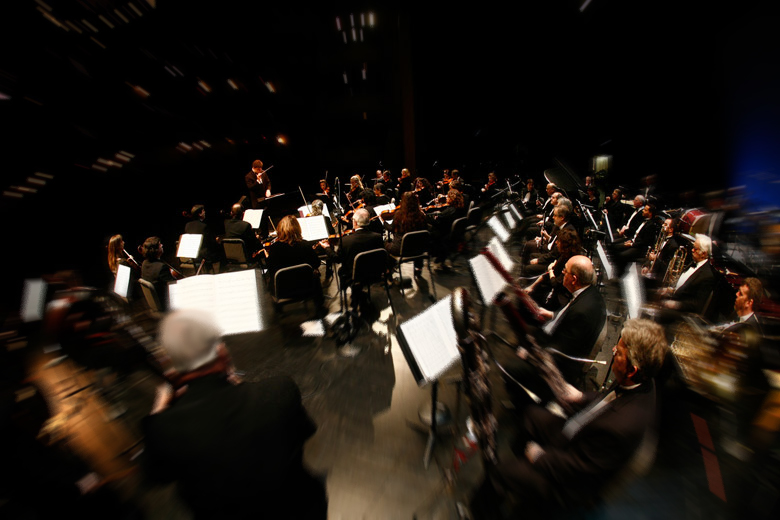
The Brooklyn Philharmonic Orchestra in 2010

In 2010, despite these fiscal challenges, the Brooklyn Philharmonic Board and management committed to attempting a rebirth with the hiring of conductor Alan Pierson as Artistic and music director. Pierson is a founder of the Alarm Will Sound ensemble and a graduate of the Massachusetts Institute of Technology and the Eastman School of Music. The orchestra's new focus was to be on Brooklyn itself, its diversity, and the excitement of its new status in the world imagination.

For his first season in 2011–12, Pierson conceived three series of programs, each developed with and performed in a specific Brooklyn community: the Downtown Brooklyn series focused on that neighborhood's history, the Brighton Beach series delved into that community's Russian roots and traditions, and the Bed-Stuy series drew on the legacy of rap and DJ artists whom that neighborhood had produced. Critics responded enthusiastically to the philharmonic's rebirth, its programming, and its performances: Alex Ross described the orchestra's "first season under Alan Pierson" as "remarkably innovative, perhaps even revolutionary", and The New York Times praised Pierson's and the Philharmonic's "remarkable", "brilliant" performance, and wrote that on its new path, the Philharmonic "has the potential to be not just a good orchestra but also an important one." The orchestra's performances around Brooklyn were well attended by enthusiastic audiences, and the 2012–13 season culminated in two sold-out shows at the Brooklyn Academy of Music. In spite of the Brooklyn Philharmonic's popular and critical success in its two seasons under Pierson, the orchestra was unsuccessful in attracting donor and institutional funding sufficient to maintain its business model. A WQXR blog post about the philharmonic's financial difficulties noted that "several Philharmonic musicians blame the orchestra's current troubles on the radical shift away from its traditional symphonic formats." The orchestra again suspended performances in late 2013.

The orchestra's administrative offices were located in the artistic enclave of Dumbo in downtown Brooklyn.

==== Music directors ====
- Lukas Foss (1971–1990)
- Dennis Russell Davies (1991–1996)
- Robert Spano (1996–2004)
- Michael Christie (2005–2010)
- Alan Pierson (artistic director, 2010–2013)

==== Legacy ====
Like the London Symphony Orchestra and the Orpheus Chamber Orchestra, the Brooklyn Philharmonic was considered "freelance" in that its musicians were not employed full-time, but rather paid on a per-performance basis. The philharmonic long enjoyed a reputation for championing new music and for ambitious, innovative programming.

In addition to performing classical standards, the Brooklyn Philharmonic commissioned and 65 new works from living composers as well, and debuted 166 world premieres. Guest performers with the Brooklyn Philharmonic have, among others, included Yehudi Menuhin, Aaron Copland, Leonard Bernstein, Itzhak Perlman, Lorin Maazel, Peter Serkin, Michael Tilson Thomas, Jessye Norman, Robert Merrill, Alicia de Larrocha, James Galway, Victoria de Los Ángeles, Roberta Peters, Claudio Arrau, Richard Stoltzman, Leonard Rose, Byron Janis, Laurie Anderson, Elvis Costello, Lynn Harrell, Tania León, Yasiin Bey, Erykah Badu, and André Watts.

The philharmonic garnered 21 ASCAP awards for innovative programing. It was routinely reviewed by critics and journalists from The New York Times, The Wall Street Journal, the New York Post, the Brooklyn Eagle, and The Brooklyn Paper, as well as radio stations WQXR and WNYC, among other media outlets.

During the tenure of Executive Director Gregg Gustafson, the Brooklyn Philharmonic appeared multiple times on the television show Late Night with David Letterman. Brooklyn Philharmonic recordings are widely available for download on iTunes, among other places.

The Brooklyn Philharmonic developed, financially supported and staffed some of the largest educational programs specifically aimed at financially disadvantaged children in New York City. The Philharmonic's "Smart Arts Academy", for example, provided free daily music, arts, dance, theater, sports, movie making, and enrichment activities to about 250 students per school annually, totaling some 6,000 students from New York's most financially challenged public schools. The philharmonic's educational programs were supported by funds obtained by and for the orchestra.

==== Concert halls ====
The earliest Philharmonic Society of Brooklyn was one of the principal founders of the Brooklyn Academy of Music (BAM). The last Brooklyn Philharmonic (then the Brooklyn Philharmonia) was in turn founded under the auspices of BAM in 1954, where it had its first home. The two institutions were not legally separated until 1971, although the Philharmonia/Philharmonic continued to perform at BAM. Over time the relationship between the Brooklyn Philharmonic and BAM was sufficiently intertwined that it had once again become "practically speaking a subdepartment of BAM."

In 1990 this relationship was formalized to a greater degree, and the Brooklyn Philharmonic served as resident orchestra for BAM from then until 2005, performing frequently in BAM's Howard Gilman Opera House, with 2,109 seats, as well as in the same institution's Harvey Lichtenstein Theater, with 874 seats. A 1998 article in The New York Times observed, "the association with BAM has been a mixed blessing. It has helped define the orchestra's artistic personality, but it is also the root of several current problems." The president of the philharmonic's board at the time remarked, "our relationship with BAM has gone through its ups and downs. There is confusion among the public as to whether we are part of BAM, or independent, and over time we've tried closer and looser affiliations. We find that decentralization works better. But the orchestra also likes the alignment with BAM and its image of being willing to try new things." Harvey Lichtenstein, then director of BAM and the driving force in the 1990 agreement, asserted, "basically, I think the institution has to stand on its own two feet, artistically, financially and administratively."

The BAM residency ended in 2005, and while the Brooklyn Philharmonic did continue to perform there on occasion, for the most part it "evaporated ... to a trickle of community-oriented chamber-music events" around Brooklyn. With the hiring of a new director, the Philharmonic "intend[ed] to establish enduring bases throughout the borough." The philharmonic performed at the Brooklyn Public Library in the 189-seat Stevan Dweck Center for Contemporary Culture as well as in the Brooklyn Museum in the 460-seat Iris and B. Gerald Cantor Auditorium. In 2010, it was "squeezed financially out of BAM" altogether. In 2011, it announced plans to focus on Bedford-Stuyvesant, Brighton Beach, and Downtown Brooklyn. Pierson remarked, "We really want to go back to BAM. I know the orchestra players miss it terribly."

Starting in 1974, the philharmonic began performing in Prospect Park in the summer and performed annually at many of New York's longest running art festivals, including Celebrate Brooklyn! as well as at New York's largest church, Cathedral of St. John the Divine. The Brooklyn Philharmonic first performed at Lincoln Center in 1964, just two years after the opening of 2,738-seat Philharmonic Hall (now David Geffen Hall). The orchestra premiered in Carnegie Hall in 1973 and continued to appear in Carnegie Hall's main Isaac Stern Auditorium, with 2,804-seats, periodically, with the final such concert at Carnegie in 2011.
