= Caleb Burhans =

American composer, singer, and musician

- Born: 1980 (age 45–46)
- Genres: Modern/contemporary
- Occupations: Composer, conductor, singer, multi-instrumentalist

Caleb Burhans is an American composer, singer, and multi-instrumentalist in the contemporary/modern music scene. He has been commissioned by Lincoln Center, Carnegie Hall, the Library of Congress, and the Kronos Quartet. His works have been performed by ensembles such as the JACK Quartet, Roomful of Teeth, and eighth blackbird. He is a founding member of Alarm Will Sound, Ensemble Signal, and the Wordless Music Orchestra. He has worked with a diverse array of artists from Arcade Fire, The National, and Paul McCartney to Max Richter, Jóhann Jóhannsson, George Crumb, and Steve Reich.

== Early years and personal life ==
Born in 1980, Burhans is a native of Monterey, California. He began composing in 1990. He was then a boy soprano who just started taking violin and piano lessons. In an article written for the WQXR Editorial, Burhans stated that his early musical influences were varied, ranging from Mozart to Philip Glass and Steve Reich, to the Beatles and Sam and Dave. He also said that listening to rock’n’roll growing up had a profound impact on the music that he would later write. During his teenage years, he sang in various choirs, played in professional orchestras, and was involved with several punk and jazz bands.

Burhans attended the Interlochen Arts Academy and the Eastman School of Music, where he received a bachelor’s degree in composition and viola performance in 2003. At Eastman, he was involved with the student-run new music ensemble Ossia; performed with the early music ensemble Collegium Musicum; wrote works for Musica Nova and St. Paul’s Episcopal Church; was a substitute in the Rochester Philharmonic Orchestra; and sang with the Brockport Symphony Orchestra.

Burhans resides in New York City with his wife, Martha Cluver, and their daughter.

== Career ==
In 2001, Alan Pierson formed the contemporary music ensemble Alarm Will Sound, where Burhans was a founding member.

In 2003, Burhans graduated from the Eastman School and moved to NYC. Together with Grey McMurray, they formed the ambient rock duo itsnotyouitsme. In the same year, Burhans’ “Amidst Neptune” was commissioned by Brad Lubman and premiered by Eastman’s Musica Nova. The work was later performed as part of Steve Reich’s 70th birthday celebration in 2006 at the Whitney Museum.

In 2006, Burhans’ arrangement of John Adams’ “Coast” from Hoodoo Zephyr, commissioned by Carnegie Hall and Alarm Will Sound, was premiered at Carnegie Hall.

In 2008, Burhans’ setting of Psalm 118 (for mixed choir, children’s choir, brass and organ) was performed for Easter at Trinity Church Wall Street. “In a distant place”, commissioned by the Bloomingdale School of Music, was premiered on June 20 at Christ & Saint Stephen’s Episcopal Church.

In 2009, Burhans' “Oh Ye of Little Faith (Do You Know Where Your Children Are?)” was premiered by Alan Pierson and Alarm Will Sound on March 3 for the reopening of Alice Tully Hall, commissioned by Lincoln Center. In the same year, he was awarded the Leonore Annenberg Fellowship in the Performing and Visual Arts, which included a two-year grant totaling $153,000.

Burhans’ debut album, Evensong, was released in 2013 on Cantaloupe Music. It was listed as one of NPR Classical’s 10 Favorite Albums of 2013. A compilation of seven of his choral and instrumental pieces, the album title alludes to Burhans’ roots in church music. His setting of the Magnificat and Nunc dimittis, recorded by the Trinity Wall Street Choir, opens and closes the album respectively in the same manner as a choral evensong. The instrumental, secular works were performed by Alarm Will Sound and Tarob Cello Ensemble. The album could be seen as Burhans’ statement of his complex connection to the church and his struggle with religion.

In 2015, Burhans contracted Alarm Will Sound for 8 performances with Björk at Carnegie Hall and Kings Theatre to kick-start her Vulnicura world tour.

Burhans’ second album, Past Lives, was released in 2019 on Cantaloupe Music. The opening track, “A Moment for Jason Molina”, was on the list of NPR’s Best Songs of 2019, alongside works by major pop artists such as Billie Eilish, Lizzo and Carly Rae Jepsen. Burhans described his four-track album as a collection “reflecting on years lost to addiction and fallen friends.”

== Musical style ==
While many people categorize Burhans’ music as indie classical or alternative classical, he is rather skeptical of the term. He once said in an interview, “People need to have labels for record stores—oh, wait, record stores don’t exist anymore.” He believed that avant-garde classical music had considerable links with avant-garde rock music, further claiming that he composes in an “emo-classical” style – a poignant and devotional mode of composition that draws equally from sacred and secular source material.

As a musical polyglot and a contemporary musician who defies categorization, Burhans is drawn to most musical styles. His compositions consist of a diverse blend of styles – from early music to minimalist, to ambient rock. They embrace a wide range of sonorities, from solo acoustic instruments to orchestras, to pure electronics.

== Compositions and projects ==
Solo

- 2 Preludes, for organ
- A Moment in the Rothko Chapel, for piano or guitar
- A Moment for Nick Drake, for piano or electric guitar
- Anything You Say Is Going to Sound Like Goodbye, for cello
- Becoming Autumn, for harp or piano
- By Way of Force, for piano
- Down to Earth, for cello
- Escape Wisconsin, for solo instrument
- Glimpses of Mars, for bass
- In a Space between Time, for violin or piano
- In Time of Desperation, for piano
- Leid mit Mut, for piano
- Lullaby for Madeline, for marimba
- Lullaby for Maia, for marimba
- Remembrance, for violin
- Time Well Spent, for singing marimba (5 octave)
- Tuba mirum (in tempore belli), for trombone
- You Could Hear It Touch the Viking, for viola

Solo with electronics

- A Moment for Elliott Smith, for flute and backing track
- A Moment for Jason Molina, for electric guitar and backing track
- Caprices 1-8, for solo electric guitar and Line 6 DL4
- Pluckbro’s Little Ditty, for violin and looping pedal
- Unspeakable Truths, for viola and backing track
- The Winter of Our Discontent, for clarinet and backing track
- Walk Through the Valley of Dead Flowers, for violin and backing track

Chamber (2-5 players)

- As Desperation Sets In, for clarinet and piano
- Contritus, for string quartet
- December 08, for four hands piano
- Escape New York, for two violins
- Gatekeeper, for horn, trombone and tuba
- Harbinger of Sorrows, for bassoon and piano
- Hereafter, for trombone quartet (ATTB)
- In the Dark of the Night, for oboe, clarinet, horn and bassoon
- Jahrzeit, for string quartet
- Keymaster, for flute, viola and harp
- Once in a Blue Moon, for harp and marimba (5 octave)
- On the Wings of Mercury, for oboe and viola
- Orange, for piano quintet
- Phantasie, for trombone and piano or cello/piano or viola/piano
- Secrets in the World, for piano quintet
- Time to Spare, for clarinet, cello and vibes
- Until the Sunset Knows No Morrow, for flute, cello, violin and percussion
- Where the Wind Blows, for string quartet

Large ensemble (6-12 players)

- A Moment for Jason Molina, for eleven electric guitars
- In a Distant Place, for recorder, two flutes, vibes, four hands piano and strings
- The Things Left Unsaid, for cello octet

Solo voice with instruments

- A Poem Written for the Concrete Beneath the Bridge, for mezzo soprano and piano
- Ave Maria, for mezzo-soprano and alto saxophone
- Excelsior, for soprano and chamber ensemble
- No, for mezzo-soprano and backing track
- Requiem for a General Motors in Janesville, WI, for soprano, violin, cello, bass, clarinet, electric guitar, keyboard, percussion and drum set

Choral (a capella)

- Beneath
- No
- Tired Tropes for Battered Souls

Choral with instruments

- An Advent Song
- I Will Lift Up Mine Eyes Unto the Hills
- Life Is Nothing
- Magnificat
- May You Know Almighty Grace
- Nunc dimittis
- Psalm 23
- Prepare for Death and Follow Me
- Psalm 118
- Super Flumina Babylonis
- Why Must You Leave Me Now When You’re So Far Way

Orchestral

- OM
- Psalm 23

Chamber Orchestra

- Amidst Neptune
- Escape Wisconsin (alarm remix)
- Glimmer
- Iceman Stole the Sun
- Oh Ye of Little Faith… (Do You Know Where Your Children Are?)

Electronics

- 1960 #1 & #2
- A Moment for Kurt Cobain
- Early Music for a Saturday
- Lost Hope

== Discography ==
Albums

- Evensong (2013) featuring Alarm Will Sound, Trinity Wall Street Choir and Tarab Cello Ensemble
- Past Lives (2019) featuring Simon Jermyn, JACK Quartet and Duo Harpverk

Collaborations

- walled gardens (2008) with itsnotyouitsme
- fallen monuments (2010) with itsnotyouitsme
- sweet light crude (2010) with contemporary music ensemble Newspeak
- i am not (2010) with flute, viola, and harp trio janus
- everybody's pain is magnificent (2011) with itsnotyouitsme
- Roomful of Teeth (2012) with Roomful of Teeth
- This I (2013) with itsnotyouitsme
- Render (2015) with Roomful of Teeth
