= Ken Ueno =

American composer (born 1970)

Ken Ueno (born January 11, 1970) is an American composer.

== Career ==
Ueno was born in Bronxville, New York, and pursued initial studies in music at the United States Military Academy in West Point, NY, but soon transferred to Berklee College of Music, where he earned a B.M. in Film Scoring/Composition Summa Cum Laude (1992); his graduate studies at Boston University and Yale School of Music earned him master's degrees; he later completed a doctorate at Harvard University.

Ueno has taught at the University of Massachusetts Dartmouth, and now teaches at the University of California, Berkeley. He has served as co-director of Minimum Security Composers Collective, and has earned the distinction of having earned the American Academy prizes for both the Berlin and Rome fellowships, and has worked with premier ensembles internationally to considerable critical acclaim.

== Works ==
Ken Ueno has composed for modern orchestra, jazz 'big band', chamber ensembles including woodwind quintet, choreographed dance pieces, and in a variety of other genres.

As a performer, Ueno has performed at the Flea, New York City, collaborated with violist Kim Kashkashian and percussionist Robyn Schulkowsky on the works Hypnomelodiamachia for viola, percussion, and electronics (2007), and Two Hands, a Kashkashian commission, for viola and percussion (2009). A monograph compact disc of three works for soloist(s) and orchestra, Talus for viola and orchestra, On a Sufficient Condition for the Existence of Most Specific Hypothesis for solo throat-singer and orchestra, and Kaze-no-Oka for biwa, shakuhachi, and orchestra, was released by the Boston Modern Orchestra Project in 2010. Ueno has also written for such ensembles as the So Percussion Group, Bang on a Can All-Stars, San Francisco Contemporary Music Players, Del Sol String Quartet, Prism Quartet, and eighth blackbird.

Ueno's compositional approach frequently involves extra-musical modeling, including using images, cultural phenomena, or architecture as the basis for structural decisions, somewhat analogous to the use of architectural proportions in Renaissance music. Kaze-no-Oka, for example, reflects in part the structure of the Japanese architect Fumihiko Maki's like-named project. His Talus is, in a manner of speaking, a biography of a traumatic event in the life of its soloist, violist Wendy Richman, who shattered her ankle in a ten-foot fall. He is keenly interested in the process of exploring unique, in some sense irreproducible, sonic events linked to the performers for which his music is written.

As a performer, Ueno is active as a throat-singing vocalist and performing with live electronics. He is an accomplished guitarist.

In 2010, he was awarded the Berlin Prize residential fellowship in Music Composition at the American Academy in Berlin.

== Awards ==
- 2010 Berlin Prize
- 2007 Rome Prize
- Fromm Music Foundation grant
- Aaron Copland House grant
- Aaron Copland Fund for Music Recording grant
- National Endowment for the Arts grant
- Belgian-American Education Foundation
- First Prize in the 25th "Luigi Russolo" competition
- Harvard University grant

== Discography ==
- "Ken Ueno: Talus", BMOP/sound, BMOP1014
- "I screamed at the sea until nodes swelled up, then my voice became the resonant noise of the sea", in New Dialects, Centaur CRC 3038, Gregory Oakes, 2009
- "Synchronism Six-Zero", in One Minute More, Transatlantic Foundation for Music and Art B001J54A8S, Guy Livingston, 2008
- "Scrapyard Exotica," by Del Sol String Quartet, Sono Luminus (2015) (featuring "Peradam" (2012)
