= San Francisco Contemporary Music Players =

Performing arts organization and chamber orchestra

- Chamber orchestra
- Short name: SFCMP
- Founded: 1974
- Music director: Eric Dudley
- Website: sfcmp.org

The San Francisco Contemporary Music Players (SFCMP) is a performing arts organization and unionized chamber orchestra that nourishes the creation and dissemination of new music through world-class performances, commissions, and community and education programs. The Players perform the music of composers from across cultures and stylistic traditions who are creating a vast and vital 21st-century musical language featuring the work of iconic and emerging composers, while shining a spotlight on works for large ensemble and Californian artists. The Contemporary Music Players incorporated in 1974 to give voice to the burgeoning genre of contemporary music in the Bay Area. They are solely devoted to contemporary repertoire, particularly the work of living composers and large ensemble works. The current artistic director is Eric Dudley.

The Contemporary Music Players are a 2018 awardee of the Fromm Foundation Ensemble Prize and a ten-time winner of the national ASCAP / Chamber Music America Award for Adventurous Programming of Contemporary Music. The San Francisco Contemporary Music Players have performed more than 1,400 contemporary works, including many U.S., West Coast, and world premieres. The ensemble has commissioned over 70 new pieces from such composers as John Adams, Olly Wilson, John Cage, Earle Brown, Du Yun, Tyshawn Sorey, Myra Melford, Samuel Adams, Pamela Z, and Julia Wolfe.

The Contemporary Music Players have been presented by leading cultural festivals and concert series including San Francisco Performances, Los Angeles Monday Evening Concerts, Cal Performances, the Stern Grove Festival, the Festival of New American Music at CSU Sacramento, the Ojai Festival, and France's MANCA Festival.

== Artistic collaborations ==
In 1983, Frank Zappa led the ensemble in performing music by Edgard Varèse. The concert, which was emceed by Jefferson Airplane vocalist Grace Slick and held in the San Francisco Opera House, attracted an audience of more than 2,000 people. In 1997, electric guitarist Bill Frisell and drummer Joey Baron appeared as soloists with the ensemble, performing Steven Mackey’s concerto, Deal. Later the same year, soprano Dawn Upshaw appeared with the ensemble in a performance of George Crumb’s Ancient Voices of Children.

In 2023, San Francisco Contemporary Music Players began a collaboration with ARTZenter Institute to manage and serve as the performing ensemble for that organization's Emerging Composer Completion Grants. Over the first three years of the project, the partners have provided 63 grants to 46 composers currently enrolled in degree-granting programs across the U.S. and presented 24 world premieres at San Francisco's Herbst Theatre.

In 2024, the Contemporary Music Players presented the Pierrot RE:Wind Mini Festival in celebration of the 150^{th} anniversary of Arnold Schoenberg’s birth. The two concerts featured music by Kevin Day, Andrew Norman, Katherine Balch, Massimo Lauricella, Mason Bates, Joan Tower, and Jessie Montgomery. The mini-festival culminated in a performance of Schoenberg's iconic Pierrot Lunaire with an animated video by Simona Fitcal utilizing imagery from Schoenberg's own paintings and drawings. The video was created with resources provided by the Arnold Schoenberg Institute (Vienna).

== Members and staff ==
=== Current musicians ===
- Tod Brody, flute
- Kyle Bruckmann, oboe
- Sarah Rathke, oboe
- Jeff Anderle, clarinet
- Peter Josheff, clarinet
- Jamael Smith, bassoon
- Alicia Telford, horn
- Adam Luftman, trumpet
- John Freeman, trumpet
- Brendan Lai-Tong, trombone
- Peter Wahrhaftig, tuba
- Haruka Fujii, percussion
- Divesh Karamchandani, percussion
- James Beauton, percussion
- Kate Campbell, piano
- Allegra Chapman, piano
- Keisuke Nakagoshi, piano
- David Tanenbaum, guitar
- Hrabba Atladottir, violin
- Susan Freier, violin
- Kevin Rogers, violin/viola
- Stephen Harrison, cello
- Douglas Machiz, cello
- Richard Worn, contrabass

=== Executive directors ===
- Marcella DeCray (1974–1988)
- Susan Munn (1988–1991)
- Adam Frey (1991–2009)
- Christopher Honett (2009–2010)
- Carrie Blanding (2010–2012)
- Rozella Kennedy (2012–2015)
- Lisa Oman (2015–2021)
- Richard Aldag (2021–present)

=== Artistic Directors and Principal Conductors ===
- Jean-Louis LeRoux (1974–1988)
- Stephen L. "Lucky" Mosko (1988–1997)
- Donald Palma (1998–2000)
- David Milnes (2002–2009)
- Steven Schick (2011–2018)
- Eric Dudley (2018–present)

=== Board presidents ===
- Jean-Louis LeRoux (1974–1978)
- Jane Roos (1978–1986)
- Paul R. Griffin (1986–1996)
- T. William Melis (1996–2000)
- Roy C. (Bud) Johns (2000–2001)
- Anne Baldwin (2002–2005)
- Susan Hartzell (2005–2009)
- Richard D. Lee (2009–2013)
- Donald Blais (2010–2021)
- Kit Sharma (2021–2024)
- Peter Witte (2024–present)

=== Founders ===
SFCMP evolved from concerts begun in 1971 by Charles Boone and was incorporated as a nonprofit in 1974 by Marcella DeCray and Jean-Louis LeRoux. The San Francisco Contemporary Music Players is a unionized ensemble based out of San Francisco, California.

== Selected discography ==
- 1991/1993: Morton Feldman, For Samuel Beckett (Newport Classics)[CD]
- 1992: Wayne Peterson, Sextet (New World)[CD]
- 1993: Lou Harrison, The Perilous Chapel (New Albion)[CD]
- 1993: John Cage, Music for... (Newport Classic)[CD]
- 1993: Steven Mackey, Indigenous Instruments (Newport Classic)[CD]
- 1995/2000: James Newton, As the Sound of Many Waters (New World)[CD]
- 1996: John Thow, Songs for the Earth (Music and Arts Programs of America, Inc.)[CD]
- 1998: Earle Brown, Centering (Newport Classic)[CD]
- 1999: Hyo-shin Na, Music for Piano and Strings (Transcription) (Seoul)[CD]
- 2002: Andrew Imbrie, Spring Fever: Chicago Bells, Songs of Then and Now (Albany)[CD]
- 2005: Jorge Liderman, The Song of Songs (Bridge)[CD]
- 2006: Pablo Ortiz, Oscuro (Albany)[CD]
- 2007: Kui Dong, Pangu's Song (New World)[CD]
- 2008: Edmund Campion, Outside Music: Music of Edmund Campion (Albany)[CD]
- 2024: Brian Baumbusch, Polytempo Music (Other Minds)[CD]
