= Nigel Maister =

British art director

Nigel Maister is the Russell and Ruth Peck Artistic Director of the University of Rochester's International Theater Program and has been the director of the theater program since 2002. In addition to his work in theater at the university, he is also a librettist, a founding member and staging director for the ensemble Alarm Will Sound, as well as a noted collector of vernacular photography.
