= Volti =

- Origin: San Francisco, CA, United States
- Genres: classical, contemporary
- Years active: 1979-present
- Website: www.voltisf.org/

Volti is a professional vocal ensemble consisting of 16 to 24 singers based in San Francisco, focused on the commissioning and performance of new music.

In 2018, Volti became the first vocal group ever to have been awarded the Chorus America/ASCAP Award for Adventurous Programming seven times. Volti has released four CDs on the Innova Recordings label: Turn the Page, House of Voices, This is What Happened, and The Color of There Seen From Here. Volti also appeared with the Kronos Quartet on their Grammy Award–winning recording of Sun Rings by American minimalist composer Terry Riley.

== History ==
=== The San Francisco Chamber Singers ===
Founded by Robert Geary in 1979 as the San Francisco Chamber Singers, the group quickly developed a mission: "to foster and showcase contemporary American music and composers, and to introduce contemporary vocal music from around the world to local audiences." In celebration of the 25th anniversary of the group's founding, in 2003 it changed its name to Volti, a reference to the Italian musical instruction "volti subito" meaning "turn quickly."

=== Present Day ===
Volti performs two to three concert series each season in venues throughout the Bay Area. Volti has appeared at the Switchboard and SoundWave festivals of new music, has collaborated with many Bay Area new music groups including the Kronos Quartet, Left Coast Chamber Ensemble, and ODC/Dance, and has supported major orchestras in the performance of new music, including the Seattle Symphony and Philharmonia Orchestra under Esa-Pekka Salonen. The group celebrated its 40th anniversary in 2019.

Volti also sponsors the Choral Arts Laboratory, a commissioning and residency program for American composers under age 35, and the Choral Institute for high school students.

== Outreach ==
=== Choral Arts Laboratory ===
Started in 2003, Volti's Choral Arts Laboratory is a commissioning and residency program aimed at composers under 35. Each year, the composer selected for the program takes part in workshops to develop a piece, then works directly with the Volti singers in rehearsal, hearing how the piece sounds and getting feedback from the singers. The composer may then consult with Robert Geary (Volti's artistic director) and Mark Winges (Volti's resident composer) throughout the year as they finish perfecting the piece, which is then premiered at a Volti concert during the regular season.

=== Choral Institute ===
Volti's Choral Institute program brings together high school choir singers from around the Bay Area for weekend-long workshops at the CYO-McGucken Center in Occidental. The high school singers work with Volti singers, Volti conductor Robert Geary, and their own conductors to improve upon their choral technique and to prepare pieces for performance as a massed choir. The Choral Institute is offered twice during the school year; once for mixed choirs in October, and once for treble choirs in January. In 2009, Volti added a resident composer to the Choral Institute program. Morten Lauridsen worked with the students for the weekend intensive, and returned in May 2010 to play the piano accompaniment to his "Nocturnes" song cycle, sung by the massed choir of 120 voices. Other composers in residence have included Kirke Mechem, Stacy Garrop, Eric Tuan, Melissa Dunphy and LJ White.

== World Premieres ==
=== 2002 ===
- The Mystery - Tamar Diesendruck (Volti Commission)

=== 2003 ===
- American Shape-Note Tunes - Mark Winges (Volti Commission)
- American Trio - Kirke Mechem
- Shui Diao Ge Tou / Song - Kui Dong
- Songs for Dancing - Mark Winges (Volti Commission)
- Two Yeats Choruses - Alan Fletcher (Volti Commission)
- When Summer Shines - Jacob Avshalomov (Volti Commission)
- While I Was Walking, I Heard a Sound - Miya Masaoka

=== 2004 ===
- Image & Motion: A Choral Symphony - Mark Winges (Volti Commission)
- Songs of Love and Loss (revised version) - Paul Chihara
- Sonnets of War & Mankind - Stacy Garrop (Volti Commission)
- Tautology - Peter Knell (Volti Commission)

=== 2005 ===
- Ccollanan María - Gabriela Lena Frank (Volti Commission)
- The Essence of Gravity - Robert Paterson (Volti Commission)
- No More to Hide - Alan Fletcher (Volti Commission)
- Sonnets of Desire, Longing & Whimsey - Stacy Garrop (Volti Commission)
- Subandi - Carlos Sanchez-Gutierrez (Volti Commission)

=== 2006 ===
- Blessings - Jacob Avshalomov (Volti Commission)
- O the Flesh Is Hot But the Heart Is Cold - Eric Moe (Volti Commission)
- Open the Book of What Happened - Mark Winges (Volti Commission)
- Sound Explanations - Eric Lindsay (Volti Commission)

=== 2007 ===
- A Cricket Needs a Queen - Mark Winges
- In the Black - Amy Beth Kirsten (Volti Commission)
- Let Evening Come - Howard Hersh
- The Locust Tree - Richard Festinger (Volti Commission)
- Only One Great Thing - Cindy Cox (Volti Commission)
- Phoenix Songs, Op. 28 - Toon Vandevorst (Volti Commission)
- Sonnets of Beauty and Music - Stacy Garrop (Volti Commission)
- Two Poems of Delmore Schwartz - Wayne Peterson

=== 2008 ===
- Dancing in the Wind - Elliott Gyger (Combined Volti & Piedmont Choirs Commission)
- Endless - Kurt Rohde (Volti Commission)
- Words Become Unlatched - George Lam (Volti Commission)

=== 2009 ===
- The Assembling Landscape - Mark Winges (Volti Commission)
- The Ballad of James Parry - Ruby Fulton (Volti Commission)
- Daglarym / My Mountains - Donald Crockett (Volti Commission)
- On the Day the World Ends - Robert Paterson (Volti Commission)

=== 2010 ===
- Where Everything is Music - Mark Winges (Volti Commission)
- The Poetry of Earth - Joshua Fishbein (Volti Commission)
- Zeteo - Jean Ahn (Volti Commission)
- Being (Two Poems of Billy Collins) - Yu-Hui Chang (Volti Commission)
- Luna, Nova Luna - Mark Winges (Volti Commission)
- Paghahandog - Robin Estrada (Volti Commission)
- privilege - Ted Hearne (Volti Commission)

=== 2011 ===
- Delusional Paths - Tom Flaherty (Volti Commission)
- Painted Lights - Kui Dong (Combined Volti and Piedmont Choirs Commission)
- after stephen foster - David Lang (West Coast Premiere)
- Other Floods - Tamar Diesendruck (Volti Commission)
- voice (and nothing more) - Elliott Gyger (Volti Commission)
- Genesis - Matthew Barnson (Volti Commission)

=== 2012 ===
- Canticles of Rumi - Mark Winges (Volti Commission)
- Songs of Lowly Life - Stacy Garrop (Volti Commission)
- . . . is knowing . . . - John Muehleisen (Volti Commission)
- The day on Which the World Didn't End - Francisco Cortés-Álvarez (Volti Commission)
- A Lettrist Bottle, a Fountain of Everything I've Ever Intended to Say, May it Reach You on Your Desert Island, That We Might Start Anew - Ken Ueno (Volti Commission)

=== 2013 ===
- Cancionero Amoroso - Armando Bayolo (Volti Commission)
- Wear Flowers in Your Hair - Dan Visconti (Volti Commission)
- Pacific Beach - Harold Meltzer (Volti Commission)
- Battle Hymns - David Lang (West Coast Premiere) (with The San Francisco Choral Society, The Leah Stein Dance Company, The Piedmont East Bay Children's Choir)

=== 2014 ===
- Scenes from "Unremembered" - Sarah Kirkland Snider (World Premiere of chamber chorus version)
- All Night - Mark Winges (Volti Commission)
- Gratitude Sutra - Forrest Pierce (Commissioned by the Barlow Endowment for Music Composition for the BBC Singers, the Latvian Radio Choir, and Volti)
- Paradise - Shawn Crouch (World Premiere of the Revised Version)
- A*R**T ACT - David Smooke
- The Oath of Allegiance - Melissa Dunphy (Volti Commission)
- Sound From the Bench - Ted Hearne (Volti Co-Commission with The Crossing)

=== 2015 ===
- Death With Interruptions - Kurt Rohde (a chamber opera adapted by Thomas Laqueur from the novel by José Saramago, presented in collaboration with the Left Coast Chamber Ensemble)
- Pandora's Gift - Mark Winges (Volti Commission, made possible by a grant from the Gerbode-Hewlett Foundations Music Commissioning Awards Initiative)
- Bone - Ryan White (Volti Commission)
- Digression on No. 1, 1948 - LJ White (Volti Commission)

=== 2016 ===
- It Is Possible These Things Do Not Exist - Amy Beth Kirsten (Volti Commission)
- Graffiti Canons - Robert Paterson (Volti Commission)
- From Ivory Depths - Tonia Ko (Volti Commission)
