= Siegfried Landau =

German-American conductor and composer (1921–2007)

Siegfried Landau (September 4, 1921 – February 20, 2007) was a German-born American conductor and composer.

He was born in Berlin, the son of Ezekiel Landau, an Orthodox rabbi, and Helen (Grynberg) Landau. He was a music student at the Stern and Klindworth-Scharwenka Conservatories in Germany. His family emigrated to London in 1939. In 1940, Landau came to New York City and was a pupil of Pierre Monteux. In 1943, he became a faculty member of the New York College of Music (after 1968 absorbed into New York University's Steinhardt School of Culture, Education and Human Development). In 1948, he conducted the Naumburg Orchestral Concerts, in the Naumburg Bandshell, Central Park, in the summer series. Landau joined the Brooklyn Philharmonic (then called the Brooklyn Philharmonia) in 1955, an orchestra comprised at that time of freelance musicians in the New York City area with a focus on contemporary or infrequently performed classical music. His tenure as the orchestra's music director was from 1955 to 1971, when he resigned after the orchestra had reduced its season and programming opportunities during a period of financial difficulty. From 1961 to 1981, he was the conductor of the Music for Westchester Symphony (later the White Plains Symphony), until he left the orchestra over disputes with the board of directors regarding programming. He led the Chattanooga Opera Association from 1960 to 1973. In Europe, he was Generalmusikdirektor of the Westphalian Symphony Orchestra from 1973 to 1975.

Landau's compositions included music for a dance drama, The Dybbuk, by Anna Sokolow. Landau was also a teacher at the Jewish Theological Seminary and the music director for Shearith Israel Synagogue, Manhattan.

Landau married Irene Gabriel in 1954, and they had two sons, Robert and Peter. Landau often conducted the music for Gabriel's dance company in the 1950s and 1960s. Landau and Gabriel moved into their Brushton home in upstate New York in the 1980s. They died in a fire which destroyed the residence. Their sons survived them.

Preceded by no predecessor	Music Director, Brooklyn Philharmonia; 1955–1971	Succeeded by Lukas Foss
Preceded by no predecessor	Music Director, White Plains Symphony; 1961–1981	Succeeded by Paul Dunkel
