= Del Sol Quartet =

American string quartet

- Origin: San Francisco, CA
- Genres: Contemporary classical, minimalism, just intonation
- Occupation: String Quartet
- Years active: 1992–present
- Labels: Bright Shiny Things, Sono Luminus, Other Minds, New World, Sacred Bones, Innova, Navona
- Members: Hyeyung Sol Yoon, violin; Benjamin Kreith, violin; Charlton Lee, viola; Kathryn Bates, cello
- Past members: Kate Stenberg, violin; Rick Shinozaki, violin; Hannah Addario-Berry, cello; Samuel Weiser, violin
- Website: https://www.delsolquartet.com/

The Del Sol Quartet is a string quartet based in San Francisco, California that was founded in 1992 by violist Charlton Lee.

Del Sol has commissioned and premiered thousands of works from a diverse range of international composers, including Terry Riley, Frederic Rzewski, Tania León, Mason Bates, Gabriela Lena Frank, Huang Ruo, Michael Harrison, Ben Johnston, Chinary Ung, Daniel Bernard Roumain, Kui Dong, Mohammed Fairouz, Theresa Wong, Erberk Eryilmaz, Ken Ueno, Peter Sculthorpe, Pamela Z, Reza Vali, Per Nørgård.

As of 2023, quartet members are Benjamin Kreith (violin), Hyeyung Sol Yoon (violin), Charlton Lee (viola), and Kathryn Bates (cello). Hyeyung Sol Yoon, formerly of the Chiara String Quartet, succeeded violinist Samuel Weiser.

== Founding ==
Founded in 1992, the Del Sol String Quartet began its life in residence at the Banff Centre for the Arts, followed by residency at San Francisco State University in association with the Alexander String Quartet. In 2002, Del Sol released its CD Tear. Del Sol was named winner of the Chamber Ensemble/Mixed Repertory category for 2005-2006 by Chamber Music America and ASCAP, and also received an ASCAP award for Adventurous Programming of Contemporary Music Other early appointments included the 2003 "Emerging Quartets and Composers Residency" with the Muir String Quartet and Joan Tower in Park City, Utah; Quartet-in-Residence at University of New Mexico; residencies at The Walden School and Tahoe Music Festival; and Northeastern University in 2007. Del Sol appears on programs presented by Other Minds, San Francisco Performances, Montalvo Arts Center and Santa Fe New Music/Santa Fe Opera. (from website)

== Interest in Just Intonation ==
The quartet demonstrates a particular interest in string quartet writing in just intonation, particularly in the work of American composer Ben Johnston, along with composers such as Michael Harrison, Theresa Wong and Mathew Rosenblum. They are currently the only string quartet touring multiple quartets by Ben Johnston, which are notoriously difficult, and were the first group to premiere Johnston's music at the Library of Congress in Washington, D.C., in 2016. In 2019, the quartet launched the "Pacific Pythagorean Music Festival", a music festival dedicated to works of just intonation. They were highlighted performers at the Pittsburgh "Beyond 2020: Microtonal Music Festival". They premiered "One-Footed" by composer Taylor Brook with the Partch Ensemble at REDCAT in 2022.

== Amplifying Asian Voices ==
The Quartet's repertoire has always been chosen from the vantage point of San Francisco, looking across the Pacific Ocean, with a dedicated interest in the Pacific Rim and Asia. With the launching of the Angel Island Project in 2017, alongside the increase in violence and hate crimes against Asian-Americans, the Quartet deepened its commitment to champion the musical and artistic voices of both Asian and Asian-American composers. This work includes majors projects, commissioning of composers, and community work.

In 2021, the Quartet premiered Huang Ruo's ANGEL ISLAND – Oratorio with Volti inside the Angel Island Immigration Station as well as San Francisco's Presidio Theatre. They previewed excerpts at Bard College's China Now music festival. Since the premiere, the Quartet has performed a new version at the Santa Fe Opera and with the UC Berkeley Choir, which launched an entire year of curriculum and events based on Angel Island. Subsequent performances included the Smithsonian National Museum of Asian Art with the US Air Force Band Singing Sergeants.

In 2022, the Quartet recorded The Resonance Between with Alam Khan (sarode/composer) and Arjun Verma (sitar/composer). This album is set to release in 2023-2024, with a world premiere performance.

The Quartet has an ongoing relationship with the Last Hoisan Poets (Genny Lim, Flo Oy Wong, Nellie Wong), who work to preserve their native dialect through poetry. The first collaborative performance focused on keeping Angel Island In Sight, with recent performances at the De Young Museum.

== Podcast ==
Sounds Current a Del Sol Podcast was launched in June 2024. Co-hosted by Quartet founding member Charlton Lee, the inaugural season follows the creation and journey of Del Sol with Huang Ruo's Angel Island Oratorio. From its premiere at the Presidio Theater of San Francisco in 2021 to its recent sold-out performances in New York in 2024, The Angel Island Project has brought the history and poetry of Angel Island’s detainees to audiences across the US and overseas.

Alongside Lee, the podcast is co-hosted by Del Sol’s cellist Kathryn Bates and violinists Benjamin Kreith and Hyeyung Sol Yoon. Season one guests include composer Huang Ruo, Angel Island Immigration Station Foundation’s Executive Director Ed Tepporn, poet Genny Lim, Angel Island descendent Andi Wong, and Angel Island State Park interpreter Casey Dexter-Lee. Additional featured guests include Sid Chen, Emiko Ono, Susan Moffat, Senior Master Sergeant Taylor Armstrong, and Matthew Ozawa.

Sounds Current was also one of four podcasts nominated for the 2024 Tribeca Festival's Independent Audio Nonfiction Award. It was previewed before its release at the Tribeca Festival's Official Selection Previews by Lee and Sounds Current producer Andrea Klunder.

== Environmental Work ==
The Quartet explores the intersection between environment and music. They are known for their nature performances, including roaming concerts at the Albany Bulb, pop-up concerts in Mendocino's redwoods, and their annual white water rafting trip on the Yampa River with Holiday Expeditions.

They also work in the intersection of artists and climate change activism, including a current project with Gabriela Lena Frank Creative Academy of Music's "Composing Earth" program.

== Joy Project ==
During the COVID-19 lockdown, the Quartet commissioned over 20 works known as the Joy Project, which they began performing outdoors in September 2020 to inspire joy in the community. The performances occurred in pop-up locations of street corners, closed movie theatres, coffee shops, and parks. Composers include: Pamela Z, Lisa Mezzaccappa, Andy Akiho, Mark Orton, and more. In 2022-2023, the performances continued through partnerships, including performances at the Salesforce Park and different branches of the San Francisco Public Library. In 2022, the Quartet was the closing act to the Atlantic Magazine's Pursuit of Happiness Conference.

== Outreach ==
The Quartet has given lectures/performances by invitation from presenters including the San Francisco Symphony Adventures in Music series, San Francisco Libraries, Music at Kohl Mansion, Young Audiences of the Bay Area, American Composers Forum and San Francisco Performances. The Quartet has an ongoing relationship with the Gabriela Lena Frank Creative Academy of Music in Boonville, CA.

== Recordings ==
Del Sol has released 12 full-length CDs since 2002 garnering international praise from publications including the New York Times, Gramophone, The Strad, Chamber Music, and the San Francisco Chronicle.

- The Resonance Between (2023): Collaborative album by artists Alam Khan, Arjun K. Verma, and Del Sol Quartet, fusing the cultural genres of Indian classical and European classical music. Sarod master Khan and acclaimed sitarist Verma composed the work in collaboration with distinguished cross-cultural composer Jack Perla.
- A Dust in Time (2021): World premiere recording of Huang Ruo's hour long meditation, released in conjunction with a coloring book by Felicia Lee (Bright Shiny Things)
  - debuted at #3 on Billboard Classical charts
  - GRAMMY award for Producer of the Year - Classical (Judith Sherman)
- Kooch-e Khamân (2021): Live concert recording of music by young Iranian composers (Gity Razaz, Adib Ghorbani, Elnaz Sayadi, Hesam Abedini, Nasim Khorassani, Niloufar Shiri and Iman Habibi)
  - debuted at #5 on Billboard Classical charts
- Dark Queen Mantra (2017): World premiere recordings including Terry Riley's "Dark Queen Mantra" & Stefano Scodanibbio "Mas Lugares"(with guitarist Gyan Riley)
- Scrapyard Exotica (2015): World premiere recordings of music by Ken Ueno, Mohammed Fairouz, and Mason Bates (Sono Luminus)
- Peter Sculthorpe Complete String Quartets with Didjeridu (2014) (Sono Luminus) (featuring Stephen Kent, didjeridu)
- Complete String Quartets of Robert Erickson (2014) (New World Records)
- Split EP (digital download): Del Sol with ZOFO, 4 hands piano duo
- ZIA (2013) features contemporary works with influences from Peru, Turkey, Spain, Iran and Uzbekistan. (Sono Luminus)
- Since When Has the Bright Moon Existed? (2011): A collection of world premiere recordings of pieces by Chinese-American composer Kui Dong, performing her seasons cycle with Melody of China.
- First Life (2009), a world premiere recording of the complete string quartets of American composer Marc Blitzstein (Other Minds)
- Ring of Fire: Music of the Pacific Rim (2008): compilation of works by eight composers from around the Pacific Rim (Other Minds)
- The Complete Works for String Quartet by American composer George Antheil (2005) (Other Minds: OM 1008-2.)
- Tear (2002), featuring a rendition of Ástor Piazzolla's "Libertango", as well as music by Lou Harrison, Earle Brown, Silvestre Revueltas, Ruth Crawford Seeger, Alberto Ginastera, and John Harbison.

They are also featured on:

- Lisa Mezzacappa and Beth Lisick: The Electronic Lover
- Gamelan Pacifica: Vessel
- SPELLLING: SPELLING & the Mystery School
- SPELLLING: The Turning Wheel
- Matt Robidoux: Music for Aluminum Corn
- Anthony Brandt: Maternity / Ulysses, Home
- D.J. Sparr: Hard Metal Cantus

== Film ==
They were featured on the soundtrack for the film Lovelace.

== Quartet personnel ==
=== Current members ===
- Hyeyung Sol Yoon - violin (2023-present)
- Benjamin Kreith - violin (2015-present)
- Charlton Lee - viola (1992-present)
- Kathryn Bates - cello (2010-present)

=== Former members ===
- Sam Weiser - violin (2018-2023)
- Rick Shinozaki - violin (2003-2018)
- Kate Stenberg - violin (1995-2015)
