= UC Berkeley Symphony Orchestra =

Orchestra at the University of California, Berkeley

- symphony orchestra
- Short name: UCBSO
- Founded: 1923 (103 years ago)
- Location: University of California, Berkeley; Berkeley, California, U.S.
- Concert hall: Hertz Hall
- Music director: David Milnes
- Website: orchestra.berkeley.edu

The UC Berkeley Symphony Orchestra is a symphony orchestra of the University of California, Berkeley, located in Berkeley, California, United States.

== History and operations ==
It was founded in 1923, and is under the direction of David Milnes. Its home concert hall is Hertz Hall on the university's campus.

The orchestra has been party to masterclasses with conductors, including Marin Alsop, Gustavo Dudamel, Valery Gergiev, Riccardo Muti, and Esa-Pekka Salonen. The orchestra has premiered many pieces by Berkeley composers.

== See also ==
- Arts and culture in Berkekey, California
- List of symphony orchestras in the United States
