= Mazy Fly =

Studio album by Spellling
- Released: February 22, 2019
- Recorded: 2018
- Studios: Antiquity Records (Oakland, CA)
- Genres: Experimental; neo soul; psychedelia; techno
- Length: 42:31
- Label: Sacred Bones
- Producer: Tia Cabral

Spellling chronology
Pantheon of Me (2017)	Mazy Fly (2019)	The Turning Wheel (2021)

Singles from Mazy Fly
- 1. "Hard to Please" Released: 2018; 2. "Haunted Water" Released: 2018; 3. "Under the Sun" Released: 2019

Mazy Fly is the second studio album by American experimental pop musician Spellling, released in February 2019. It is her debut recording with Sacred Bones Records.

== Composition ==
Kareem Ghezawi for The Quietus noted its songs as "experimental neo-soul", as well as comparing Spellling's avant-garde leanings to lauded musicians Björk, FKA twigs and Zola Jesus. He also called the record a “psychedelic circus of one". Tiny Mix Tapes noted its styles as experimental, R&B, and techno.

== Critical reception ==
Professional ratings
Aggregate scores
Source	Rating
Metacritic	84/100
Review scores
Source	Rating
AllMusic	4/5 stars
Exclaim!	9/10
Paste	8.2/10
PopMatters	9/10
Pitchfork	8.0/10
Tiny Mix Tapes	4/5 marks
Under the Radar	8/10

Mazy Fly was released to critical acclaim from music reviewers. On Metacritic, it has a score of 84/100, based on 10 reviews, indicating "universal acclaim".

Eric R. Denton for Paste called its songs "at once spacious and intimate" and the record as "remarkably cohesive". Concluding the review for AllMusic, Paul Simpson declared, "the album is a delightful trip from an unmistakably original artist."

=== Accolades ===
Publication	List	Rank	Ref.
Bandcamp Daily	The Best Albums of 2019	27	
Metacritic	Best Music and Albums for 2019	51	

== Track listing ==
All songs written by Spellling.

No.	Title	Length
1.	"Red"	2:13
2.	"Haunted Water"	4:50
3.	"Hard to Please"	2:08
4.	"Golden Numbers"	2:44
5.	"Melted Wings"	1:52
6.	"Under the Sun"	5:55
7.	"Real Fun"	3:32
8.	"Hard to Please (Reprise)"	3:34
9.	"Afterlife"	5:24
10.	"Dirty Desert Dreams"	2:32
11.	"Secret Thread"	5:06
12.	"Falling Asleep"	2:45
Total length:		42:31

== Personnel ==
Spellling

- Tia Cabral – vocals, Roland Juno-106

Additional musicians

- Divya Farias – violin, saxophone
- Andrea Genevieve – guitar (7)
- Janak Preston – percussion (10)
- Jacob Richards – percussion (7–9)
