= Kui Dong =

Chinese musician (born 1966)

Kui Dong (董葵, born 1966, Beijing, China) is a Chinese-American composer, musician, and teacher. She is known for her music which has often incorporated traditional Chinese music into contemporary contexts, and is currently Professor of Music at Dartmouth College. She has released two albums on the Other Minds record label: Hands Like Waves Unfold (2008) and Since When Has the Bright Moon Existed? (2011).

== Background in China ==
After being told at the age of 15 by a teacher that she would never become a successful pianist or conductor because of her physical stature, Dong applied to the composers program at the Central Conservatory of Music in Beijing. She was too young to be accepted and was sent to the high school program affiliated with the conservatory to study composition and theory rather than performance. After graduating from high school, she enrolled at the Central Conservatory. Here, the main focus of her studies was Western art music, from Mozart through Ravel and Debussy. Students were also required to play a traditional Chinese instrument, as well as take classes on Chinese folk music and opera. Every summer, the school also gave composition students a small amount of money to collect folk songs in remote villages. Dong says that hearing and collecting these songs would form a lasting impression on her and her music.

After four years at the Conservatory, Dong continued with the master's degree program. During these years Dong composed (with co-author Duo Huang) music for the three-act ballet Imperial Concubine Young, commissioned by the Central Ballet Group of Beijing. The music and choreography was completed for the piece in 1989, and it was premiered with full production and continued for the following two-year season. The reactions to the music of this ballet were a mix, ranging from rave reviews to being criticized as "too symphonic and complicated to function as traditional ballet music", "not Chinese enough", and "violent". Dong and many of her classmates were encouraged to continue their studies abroad, and she chose Stanford University.

== Compositional periods while in the US (1991–present) ==
During her years studying at Stanford from 1991 to 1994, Dong did not compose much. Her idea of modernity, which was Stravinsky, Bartók, and Prokofiev, was being bombarded with new forms of music she was being newly exposed to. One of these forms was computer music. The first computer piece that Dong composed, Flying Apples (1994), experiments with algorithms. There is one main timbre in the piece, which sounds something like a metallic piano. Dong says she was attracted to the visual, abstract patterns of sound that the algorithms created. Moments in her later computer music would mirror this aesthetic.

When Dong began to compose more regularly again, she deems the pieces during this time as her "Chinese music" period. Being exposed to so many new types of music, Dong held on to the musical language she knew well to keep from becoming disoriented. Most of her pieces of this time use heterophonic imitation rather than western counterpoint, are inspired by folk songs or tales, or are written for traditional Chinese instruments. One example of this is Pangu's Song (1998) written for alto flute/flute and percussion. Pangu is the giant in Chinese mythology who separated heaven and earth with a great swing of his axe. He held them separate for eighteen thousand years, then was laid to rest, his breath becoming the wind, his eyes the moon and the sun, his body the mountains, his veins the rivers, his sweat the rain, and the creatures carried by the wind over his body became human beings. The piece is not a narrative of the myth, but evokes an earthy sound with use of the alto flute and frequent fluttertongue, which has a breathy timbre closer to a bamboo flute. The percussion also evokes the natural world with use of woodblock, Chinese bass drum, and Tibetan singing bowl. Other pieces during this period include Blue Melody (1993), written for flute, clarinet, violin, cello, and piano, and inspired by a folk song collected in a remote village; and Three Voices (1998), written for zheng, erhu, and xiao. In these pieces, there is a conscious effort to sound Chinese, even within the framework or orchestration of Western art music.

In 1998 Dong met the composer György Ligeti. Stanford was hosting a reception for Ligeti's visit to campus, which Dong attended. She remembers Ligeti walking up to her and asking directly and immediately, "How many students died during the student movement in China?" Dong answered, "Isn't one enough?", and walked away from him. Ligeti must have been moved or at least interested in her reply, because later in the day he found her and said that they should have lunch together. Although Dong admits that it is difficult to pin-point the direct influence of Ligeti on her musical compositions, she says that Ligeti affected her life in a more philosophical way on a deeper level. At the time, Dong's English was poor, but she never felt that the two had trouble communicating with one another. Although 40 years her senior, Ligeti's experiences in Romania and Hungary during the Soviet invasion of Czechoslovakia were similar to Kui's in China during the student movements, and when sharing their experiences, they often felt that "history was repeating itself."

Dong does admit one conversation with Ligeti that did directly affect her identity as a composer. When Ligeti asked her what kind of composer she wanted to be known as, she replied "a Chinese composer". He then asked her why she wanted to be a Chinese composer. Dong could not provide a clear reason or justify herself. After that conversation, Dong began questioning her identity as a composer and why she felt the need to make her music recognizably Chinese. This marked the beginning of Dong's compositions that began testing the boundaries of what was Chinese and what was Western in her music. In these pieces, she creates a clash between sounds of each culture rather than limit herself to writing "Chinese" music within a Western art music context. Dong's computer piece Crossing is representative of this period. In this piece, the jarring juxtaposition between rock 'n roll slap bass guitar and a well-known Beijing opera character is in no way subtle. The timbres in Crossing are varied, unpredictable, and dissonantly opposed with one another, very different from her earlier computer piece Flying Apples, which is largely a single timbre.

In 1999 Dong began to improvise with Christian Wolff and Larry Polansky, and they formed an ensemble called Trio. This would add another element to her compositions that we see in her work Earth, Water, Wood, Metal, Fire (2001), which were based on Dong's piano improvisations. In these pieces, Dong takes inspiration from the five elements that make up the material world according to traditional Chinese beliefs, but is not seeking to write a programmatic piece. For example, Dong says that the piece Earth does not refer literally to soil, but rather is a spiritual representation of mankind that inhabits the earth. The movements Wood and Metal refer to pencils and metal rods placed in the piano strings that create distinct timbres. Fire, the last movement, is the longest and most energetic not because of the element fire's importance in mythology, but because compositionally its length allowed previous themes to return and bring the work to a close. The prepared piano shows influences of John Cage, the clusters of dissonant chords are suggestive of Henry Cowell, and repeated, stagnantly moving sections could be described stylistically as minimalist music. However, there are also fragmentary moments of pentatonic melodies as well as heterophonic passages which create the flavor of Chinese music, but in a more subtle manner than previous works. In these pieces, after being in the US for ten years, Dong finally seems to be able to amalgamate the influences that she has been exposed to and bring them together in a balanced way.

Another piece that Dong considers part of this "Fusion" period is Shui Diao Ge To & Song. The texts for this work were the 11th century poem Shui Diao Ge by Su Shi and a contemporary poem, Song, by a friend of the composer named Denise Newman. Dong felt that these two texts balanced each other within the composition, and that her work would not be complete without one or the other. Written for mixed chorus and percussion, the piece was commissioned by the Dale Warland Singers but was deemed too difficult to perform by their conductor and was eventually premiered by Volti (then known as the San Francisco Chamber Singers) in 2003. Dong views this piece as a "cultural amalgam of all her life's experiences".

In 2004, Dong wrote the piece Ludamus Denuo, which she still considers part of her "Fusion" period, but is moving in a new direction. The text of the piece is a 20th-century English poem written for children, which Dong has translated into medieval Latin and set for children's choir. Here, Dong is attempting to create a sense of timelessness and stylistic anonymity in the piece. At certain sections the piece is motet-like and at other instances evokes more of a twentieth-century harmony. When it was suggested to Dong that the piece did not sound stylistically "Chinese", she replied by saying that she is Chinese herself and asked how anything written by herself could possibly not be Chinese.

== Cultural influences ==
Although Chinese music and Western art music are strong influences, her iTunes listening spans everything from classical Indian music, to Rachmaninoff, to James Blunt (popular for his song "You’re Beautiful"), to Japanese opera.

== Analysis of The Seasons ==
One of Dong's latest pieces, entitled The Seasons or Spring, Summer, Autumn and Winter, also is from her "fusion period". The first movement, "Spring", is included on an album Ring of Fire released by the Del Sol String Quartet on the Other Minds label, which includes composers, including Dong, who have worked extensively on the Pacific Rim. The piece is written for string quartet and four Chinese musicians, who play the zheng (Chinese harp), dulcimer, sheng (mouth organ), and Chinese percussion (bass drum, tom-tom, cymbal, opera gongs, temple blocks). Dong says that the work is an homage to John Cage and Antonio Vivaldi, who both wrote music inspired based on the four seasons, solo piano in the case of John Cage, and a violin concerto in the case of Vivaldi. The first movement, "Spring", is based on a symmetrical chord structure based on the third (C, E) and gradually moving outward in thirds to expand the chord (A, C, E, G, then F, A, C, E, G, B). The entire piece basically moves from an Am7 chord to a F11 chord.

== Selected Discography ==
- Hands Like Waves Unfold (Other Minds Records, 2008)
- Since When Has the Bright Moon Existed? (Other Minds Records, 2011)
- Painted Lights (Kairos, 2022)
