= David Milnes =

American conductor and instrumentalist (born 1956)

David Milnes (born October 21, 1956) is an American conductor and instrumentalist. He is a professor at the University of California, Berkeley Department of Music and also serves as music director of the UC Berkeley Symphony Orchestra and the Eco Ensemble.

== Biography ==
Milnes was born in Long Island, New York to a musical family and attended Half Hollow Hills West High School in Dix Hills. From early childhood, Milnes played a variety of instruments, including piano, clarinet, saxophone, cello, flute, violin, and organ. He received his BA in Music (concentrating in conducting and clarinet performance) from Stony Brook University in 1978, and went on to receive a Masters and Doctorate in conducting from the Yale School of Music under the tutelage of Otto-Werner Mueller. Milnes also studied with esteemed conductors as Leonard Bernstein, Erich Leinsdorf, and Herbert Blomstedt.

== Career ==
Milnes began his professional career after receiving his Masters at Yale by winning a conducting position with the Exxon Conducting Program. His conducting debut with the San Francisco Symphony Youth Orchestra in November 1983 involved conducting a side-by-side performance of the Overture to Richard Wagner's Die Meistersinger von Nürnberg with the San Francisco Symphony. He became the music director of the Youth Orchestra in 1984.

Milnes went on to become a frequent conductor in Eastern Europe and Russia. As principal guest conductor of the Latvian National Symphony Orchestra, Milnes conducted a wide breadth of repertoire, including the works of Hector Berlioz and Steve Reich. Following several conducting engagements, Milnes went on to join the faculty at SUNY Purchase and Southern Methodist University, at which he conducted the school's symphony orchestras and lectured on the symphonic repertoire. In 1994, David Milnes was nominated for a Grammy Award for his recording of Zingari by John Anthony Lennon. Milnes also conducted extensively at the Curtis Institute of Music (most notably a production of Idomeneo by Mozart).

In 1996, Milnes joined the faculty at UC Berkeley with an intent to increase performance of the twentieth century repertoire, including the works of Stravinsky, Shostakovich, and Prokofiev. The Symphony under Milnes' direction also heavily emphasizes the performance of new music, frequently composed by Berkeley graduate students in composition. From 2002 to 2009, Milnes was also the music director of the San Francisco Contemporary Music Players.

== Partial Conducting Discography ==
- 2000: James Newton, "As the Sound of Many Waters" (CD) New World Records.
- 2002: Andrew Imbrie, Spring Fever: Chicago Bells, Songs of Then and Now (CD) Albany Records.
- 2004: Kui Dong, Pangu’s Song (CD) New World Records.
- 2005: Jorge Liderman, The Song of Songs (CD) Bridge Records.
- 2006: Pablo Ortiz, Oscuro (CD) Albany Records.
- 2008: Edmund Campion, Outside Music (CD) Albany Records.
