= Francisco Núñez (conductor) =

- Born: April 23, 1965 (age 61); New York City
- Occupations: Conductor
- Website: franciscojnunez.com
- Awards: MacArthur Fellowship, 2009 ASCAP Concert Music Award, 2009 New York Choral Society’s Choral Excellence Award, 2005 Liberty Award

Francisco J. Núñez (born 1965 New York City) is an American conductor, composer, and the Director of the Young People’s Chorus of New York City. Núñez founded the Young People's Chorus in 1988 "to provide children of all ethnic, religious, and economic backgrounds with a safe haven for personal and artistic growth." He is a 2011 MacArthur Fellow.

== Life ==
Núñez was born in New York City, and grew up in the Dominican Republic and New York's Washington Heights neighborhood. He graduated from New York University in 1988 with a B.S. in piano performance.

Núñez is the recipient of numerous awards in addition to the MacArthur Fellowship, including a 2009 ASCAP Concert Music Award, the 2009 New York Choral Society’s Choral Excellence Award, and the 2005 Liberty Award from the New York Post. He is a member of ASCAP.

Núñez founded an annual festival called Transient Glory in 2001. Transient Glory features original compositions created expressly for YPC by award-winning composers such as Paquito D'Rivera. The Transient Glory festival has been performed at leading New York City music venues such as Carnegie Hall.

Núñez also leads the University Glee Club of New York City, its fifth conductor since the all-men’s choir was established in 1894. He served as the director of choral activities at New York University from 2003 to 2010.

Núñez served as conductor of the 2011 North Carolina Middle School Honors Chorus. Núñez wrote a piece entitled 'Forever Is My Song' for the event.

On May 19, 2014, Núñez was awarded the NYU Steinhardt Distinguished Alumni Award (and received a tie custom designed for NYU by Salvatore Ferragamo).

Núñez is married to Elizabeth McKinney and has two children, Sebastian and Sabrina.
