= Alan Fletcher (composer) =

American classical composer

Alan Fletcher (born 1956) is president and CEO of the Aspen Music Festival and School and a music administrator and composer. He came to Aspen in March 2006 from the positions of Head of the School of Music and Professor of Music at Carnegie Mellon University in Pittsburgh, Pennsylvania, where he had been since 2001, and before that from leadership and faculty positions including provost and senior vice president at the New England Conservatory, where he was engaged for 16 years. He holds doctorate and master's degrees from The Juilliard School and a bachelor's degree from Princeton University, and has studied with distinguished composers such as Roger Sessions, Milton Babbitt, Edward T. Cone, and Paul Lansky.

He has won numerous composing awards and commissions, including recent commissions for the Pittsburgh Symphony and the National Gallery of Art. He lectures nationally and internationally on music and music administration, has a blog for Gramophone, and has written Op/Ed pieces for newspapers such as the Wall Street Journal, Pittsburgh Post-Gazette, Symphony, and Baltimore Sun. In addition, he sat on some of the field’s most prestigious committees such as The Gilmore Prize Artistic Board and Jury, on which he served with former AMFS artistic administrator Ara Guzelimian.

He lives in Aspen, Colorado with his partner Ronald Schiller.
