= Alarm Will Sound =

American chamber orchestra

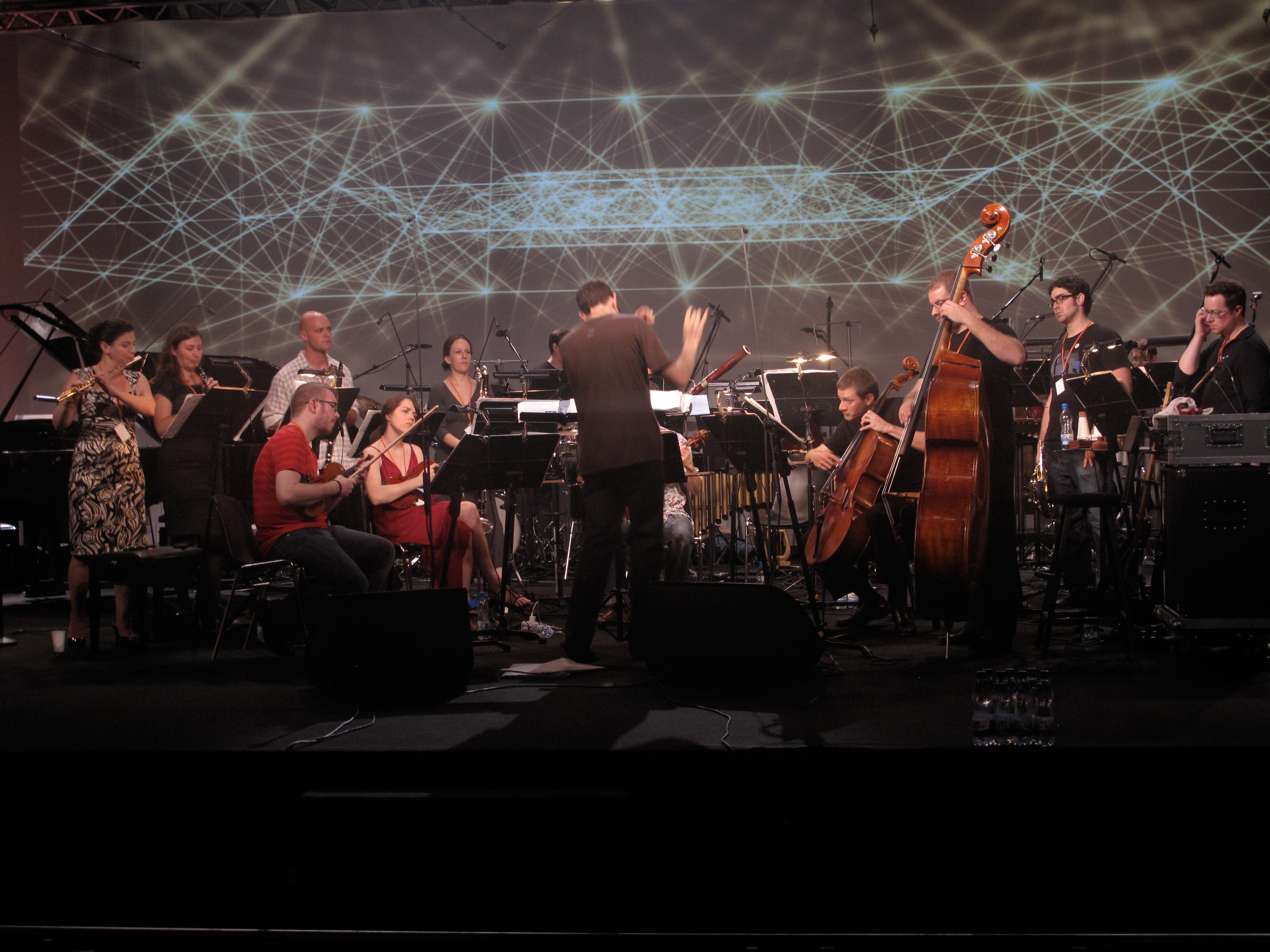
- Alarm Will Sound at Sacrum Profanum 2011

Background information
- Origin: Rochester, New York
- Genres: Classical, experimental, IDM
- Years active: 2001–present
- Labels: Cantaloupe, Nonesuch
- Website: alarmwillsound.com

Alarm Will Sound is a 20-member chamber orchestra that focuses on recordings and performances of contemporary classical music. Its performances have been described as "equal parts exuberance, nonchalance, and virtuosity" by the Financial Times and as "a triumph of ensemble playing" by the San Francisco Chronicle. The New York Times said that Alarm Will Sound is "one of the most vital and original ensembles on the American music scene."

Alarm Will Sound's repertoire ranges from European to American works, from the arch-modernist to the pop-influenced. The group has worked with contemporary composers, premiering pieces by Steve Reich, John Adams, John Luther Adams, Tyondai Braxton, David Lang, David T. Little, Michael Harrison, Cenk Ergün, Aaron Jay Kernis, Michael Gordon, Scott Johnson, Augusta Read Thomas, Stefan Freund, John Orfe, Caleb Burhans, Dennis Desantis, Wolfgang Rihm, and Tyshawn Sorey.

== History ==
Alarm Will Sound was founded at the Eastman School of Music in 1996 by graduating members of Eastman's new music ensemble, Ossia. The group's first concert was on May 24, 2001, when they performed Steve Reich's pieces Tehillim and The Desert Music with Ossia.

From 2004 to 2007, they were musical artists-in-residence at Dickinson College. ASCAP recognized Alarm Will Sound with its Concert Music Award in 2006 for "the virtuosity, passion and commitment with which they perform and champion the repertory for the 21st century."

After two recordings of music written by Steve Reich in 2001 and 2002, Alarm Will Sound's 2005 album Acoustica features acoustic arrangements of music by Aphex Twin.

Their 2009 album a/rhythmia, released on Nonesuch Records is an eclectic mix of rhythmically complex music by Benedict Mason, Michael Gordon, György Ligeti, Mochipet, Johannes Ciconia, Conlon Nancarrow, Harrison Birtwistle, Josquin des Prez, and Autechre.

In 2010, the group collaborated with Dirty Projectors to develop and perform The Getty Address in its new identity as a live performance piece at Lincoln Center, Disney Hall and the Barbican Centre. Music that Dirty Projectors front-man Dave Longstreth created on a computer by meticulous and complicated sampling, looping and layering was translated and arranged by Matt Marks, Alan Pierson, and Chris Thompson for 23 musicians of both bands.

Since 2010, the group has been the ensemble in residence at the Mizzou International Composers Festival in Columbia, Missouri, hosted by the University of Missouri School of Music. As the resident ensemble, they have premiered 8 works each year by the festival's resident composers and works by the festival's guest composers, including Derek Bermel, Oscar Bettison, Martin Bresnick, Anna Clyne, Donnacha Dennehy, Erin Gee, Daniel Kellogg, Zhou Long, Nico Muhly, Roger Reynolds, Steven Stucky, and Augusta Read Thomas.

In 2011 at Carnegie Hall, the group presented 1969, a multimedia event that uses music, images, text, and staging to tell the compelling story of great musicians—John Lennon, Karlheinz Stockhausen, Luciano Berio, and Leonard Bernstein—striving for a new music and a new world amidst the turmoil of the late 1960s. 1969's unconventional approach combining music, history, and ideas has been critically praised by The New York Times ("...a swirling, heady meditation on the intersection of experimental and commercial spheres, and of social and aesthetic agendas.... a consistent wonder."), and the LA Times ("They exploded musical genres, made history come alive and demonstrated that art—original, vivid, reckless—can lift the grim clouds of current events, if only for two hours.")

Canzonas Americanas, their 2012 release on Cantaloupe features music by Derek Bermel whose eclectic approach draws on the musical traditions of Europe, North and South America, and Africa. The San Francisco Classical Voice says about Alarm Will Sound, "It's hard to imagine another ensemble that could handle the vast range of musical ingredients – including rock, Conlon Nancarrow–style layered rhythms, jazz, and especially world music influences ranging from Brazilian choros to West African balafon – that inform this wildly eclectic new document…" The Guardian says, "Bermel tends to build his music layer by layer, creating exhilaratingly complex instrumental textures, which Alarm Will Sound realise with great panache."

Alarm Will Sound began their St. Louis Season in 2013 to complement their existing touring schedule and bring to the midwest the work they do around the country and abroad. The goal being to grow a local audience for contemporary performing arts. In St. Louis, AWS has presented concerts at The Sheldon Concert Hall, the Touhill Performing Arts Center and The Pageant.

In the 2013–2014 season, Alarm Will Sound partnered with The Metropolitan Museum of Art and became artists-in-residence at the institution. Their season at the museum includes a performance entitled "The Permanent Collection," a concert of integral works for the sinfonietta; "All Steve Reich," featuring the NY premiere of Radio Rewrite; "Twinned," a collaboration with John Heginbotham, a Brooklyn-based choreographer who worked with Mark Morris; and "I Was Here I Was I," an opera with music by Kate Soper, and libretto by Nigel Maister, performed in and around the Temple of Dendur.

The ensemble performed with Björk in March, 2015 at Carnegie Hall to kick-off her world tour for her album Vulnicura.

In 2014 Alarm Will Sound kicked off Alarm System a program that brings musical artists from a variety of backgrounds together with Alarm Will Sound to create new work. In the 2014–2015 season the ensemble worked with Medeski Martin & Wood, Valgeir Sigurðsson, and Adult Fur (St. Louis-based producer). AWS presented two concerts in Colorado with Medeski Martin & Wood presenting new pieces by John Medeski, Billy Martin, Payton MacDonald, and Miles Brown (AWS bassist) as well as arrangements of MMW originals like "End of the World Party" and "Anonymous Skulls." A live album of this cooperation "Omnisphere" was released on 14 September 2018. In the 2015–2016 season Alarm Will Sound worked with Mira Calix, Rashad Becker and Tyondai Braxton.

Alarm Will Sound first presented Ligeti, a concert in radio play format. Alarm Will Sound's production tells György Ligeti's story through a blend of music, text and imagery. Centered on his Chamber Concerto and Piano Concerto, the performance makes connections between biography and music, explores the relationship of politics and art, and sheds light on his unique artistic imagination.

Band member Matt Marks, who performed horn, keyboards and electronics, died on May 11, 2018. He was 38 years old.

During the COVID-19 pandemic Alarm Will Sound remained active, recording remotely utilizing software that allowed for real-time musical interaction as well as presenting performances of works like Ten Thousand Birds by John Luther Adams that allow for physical distancing among the audience. The remote recording projects culminated with a series entitled Video Chat Variations that featured new works by Meredith Monk, Tyshawn Sorey, John Fitz Rogers, Jlin, and Daniel Neumann.

In addition to the Video Chat Variation, Alarm Will Sound embarked on other musical projects with Tyshawn Sorey including For George Lewis, a through-composed composition scored for sinfonietta commissioned by the ensemble in 2019, as well as several versions of autoschediasms, spontaneous compositions led by Sorey drawing on the improvisational abilities of the instrumentalists. For George Lewis was premiered in 2019 at Washington University in St Louis and released on an album with two versions of autoschediasms in 2021.

In 2026, Alarm Will Sound, along with Alan Pierson, won the Grammy Award for Best Chamber Music/Small Ensemble Performance for their recording of Donnacha Dennehy's Land Of Winter.

== Current members ==
- Erin Lesser – flute
- Christa Robinson - oboe
- Elisabeth Stimpert – clarinet, saxophone
- Bill Kalinkos – clarinet, saxophone
- Michael Harley – bassoon, contrabassoon, voice, keyboards
- Tim Leopold – trumpet
- Laura Weiner – French horn
- Michael Clayville - trombone
- Christopher Thompson - percussion
- Matt Smallcomb - percussion
- John Orfe – keyboards, composer
- Courtney Orlando – violin, voice, keyboards, accordion
- Patti Kilroy - violin
- Stefan Freund – cello, composer
- Miles Brown – bass
- Alan Pierson – artistic director, conductor, keyboards
- Gavin Chuck – managing director, composer
- Nigel Maister – staging director
- Jason Varvaro – production manager

== Past members ==
- Caleb Burhans – violin, viola, voice, electric guitar, composer
- Jessica Johnson – flute
- Payton MacDonald – percussion
- Matt Marks – French horn
- Yuki Numata Resnick – viola
- Jason Price – trumpet
- John Pickford Richards – viola
- Nadia Sirota – viola

== Discography ==
=== Albums ===
- 2001. Steve Reich, Music for Large Ensemble (CD) Nonesuch Records
- 2002. Steve Reich, Tehillim/The Desert Music (CD) Cantaloupe Music
- 2005. Acoustica: Alarm Will Sound performs Aphex Twin (CD) Cantaloupe Music
- 2006. Reich at the Roxy (CD/DVD) Sweetspot Music
- 2007. Michael Gordon, Van Gogh (CD) Cantaloupe Music
- 2009. a/rhythmia (CD) Nonesuch Records
- 2012. Derek Bermel: Canzonas Americanas (CD) Cantaloupe Music
- 2014. "Radio Rewrite" with Jonny Greenwood performing Electric Counterpoint and Vicky Chow performing Piano Counterpoint (CD) Nonesuch Records
- 2016. Modernists (CD) Cantaloupe Music
- 2018. Omnisphere (with Medeski Martin & Wood) Indirecto Records
- 2019. The Hunger (by Donnacha Dennehy), with Katherine Manley and Iarla Ó Lionáird (CD) Nonesuch Records
- 2021. For George Lewis / Autoschediasms, with Tyshawn Sorey, composer (CD) Cantaloupe Music

=== Guest appearances ===
- 2013. Caleb Burhans: Evensong (CD) Cantaloupe Music
- 2013. Neil Rolnick: Gardening at Gropius House (CD) Innova Recordings
