= Young People's Chorus of New York City =

- Choir
- Origin: New York City
- Founded: 1988
- Founder: Francisco J. Núñez
- Website: www.ypc.org

Young People's Chorus of New York City (YPC) is a children's chorus based in New York City. YPC provides children of all ethnic, religious and economic backgrounds with a program of music education and choral performance and seeks to enrich the community. YPC was founded by Francisco Nunez in 1988 "to provide children of all ethnic, religious, and economic backgrounds with a safe haven for personal and artistic growth."

Beyond its New York City performances, YPC has performed in Brazil, Argentina, Sweden, Japan, China, the Dominican Republic, Wales, Germany, Bulgaria, Spain, the Czech Republic, Austria, Canada and France. It has also performed on Good Morning America, and at Lincoln Center, Carnegie Hall, the United Nations and the White House.

Among YPC's awards and honors are Chorus America's Education Outreach Award and two Chorus America/ASCAP Awards for Adventurous Programming. YPC was one of the first inductees in the WNET/Thirteen Community Hall of Fame and has been recognized for its work with urban at-risk youth by the New York State Assembly, the Mayor of the City of New York, the Manhattan Borough, and the President's Committee on the Arts and Humanities as “a national model of artistic excellence and diversity” under the administrations of Presidents Bill Clinton, George W. Bush, and Barack Obama. In 2011, the Young People's Chorus received the 2011 National Arts and Humanities Youth Program Award from the first lady, Michelle Obama, at a White House ceremony.
