= Spellling =

American experimental pop musician

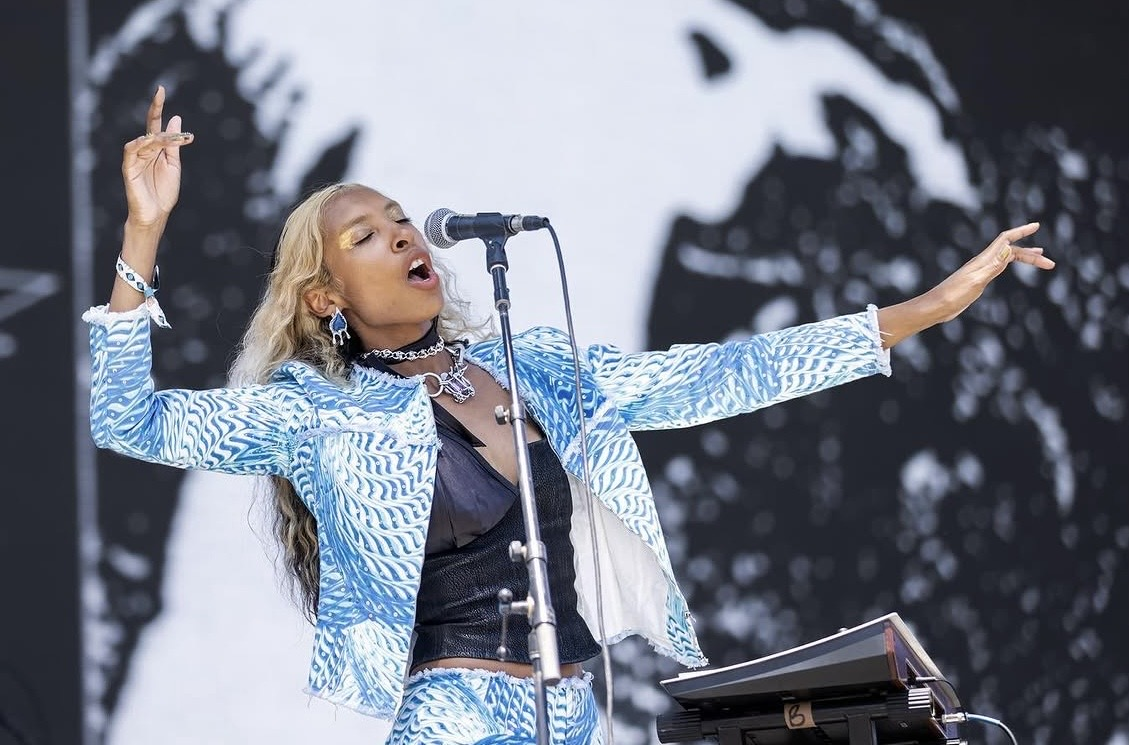
- SPELLLING performing at This Ain't No Picnic in 2023.

Background information
- Also known as: Tia Cabral
- Born: Chrystia Cabral; May 18, 1991 (age 35); Sacramento, California, U.S.
- Origin: Oakland, California, U.S.
- Genres: Progressive pop; experimental pop
- Occupations: Musician; singer; songwriter; producer
- Instruments: Vocals; synthesizer
- Years active: 2015–present
- Label: Sacred Bones
- Website: spelllingmusic.com

Chrystia "Tia" Cabral (born May 18, 1991), known professionally as Spellling (stylized in all caps), is an American experimental pop musician based in Oakland, California. Cabral released her debut album, Pantheon of Me, in September 2017. Signing to Sacred Bones Records in 2018, she followed up in February 2019 with Mazy Fly. It was met with universal acclaim by music critics, who enjoyed the dark and eerie qualities of Spellling's sound. Cabral released the third full-length Spellling album, The Turning Wheel, on June 25, 2021. She followed that up with Spellling & the Mystery School in 2023 and Portrait of My Heart in 2025.

== Early life ==
Cabral was born in Sacramento, California. She was raised in the Catholic Church, which would later influence her music.

Cabral attended the University of California, Berkeley, studying philosophy for two semesters before changing her major to English literature after feeling "shamed out of the [philosophy] department" as the only femme person and person of color. She remained at Berkeley to pursue a Master of Fine Arts, which she completed in 2019.

== Career ==
Cabral started her musical career in 2015, influenced by two events: watching a fellow San Francisco artist performing looped vocals; and the death of a close friend. At the time she was working as an elementary school teacher, and being around crayons inspired her to release a handmade CD called Crayola Church. Cabral said of the project: “I took a Crayola box and made a record based on every color in the box… I would wrap the CDs in children’s drawings and write the track listing, so some people have those [editions].”

In 2017, she self released her debut album, Pantheon of Me. In 2019, she released a follow-up, Mazy Fly, to positive reviews. In 2021, she released her third album, The Turning Wheel, to similarly positive reviews. In 2023, she announced her fourth album, Spellling & the Mystery School, which would contain re-recordings of past material.

In 2025, Cabral supported Japanese Breakfast in their Melancholy Tour across North America.

== Artistry ==
=== Influences ===
When asked about her favorite albums, Cabral named Minnie Riperton's Come to My Garden, Kraftwerk's Computer World, and Iggy Pop's The Idiot.

== Discography ==
=== Albums ===
- Pantheon of Me (2017)
- Mazy Fly (2019)
- The Turning Wheel (2021)
- Spellling & the Mystery School (2023)
- Portrait of My Heart (2025)

=== Singles ===
- "Hard to Please" (2018)
- "Little Deer" (2021)
- "Boys at School" (2021)
- "Turning Wheel" (2021)
- "Cherry / Under the Sun" (2023)
- "Hard to Please (Reprise)" (2023)
- "Portrait of My Heart" (2025)
- “Alibi” (2025)
- “Destiny Arrives” (2025)
