= Alan Pierson =

American conductor

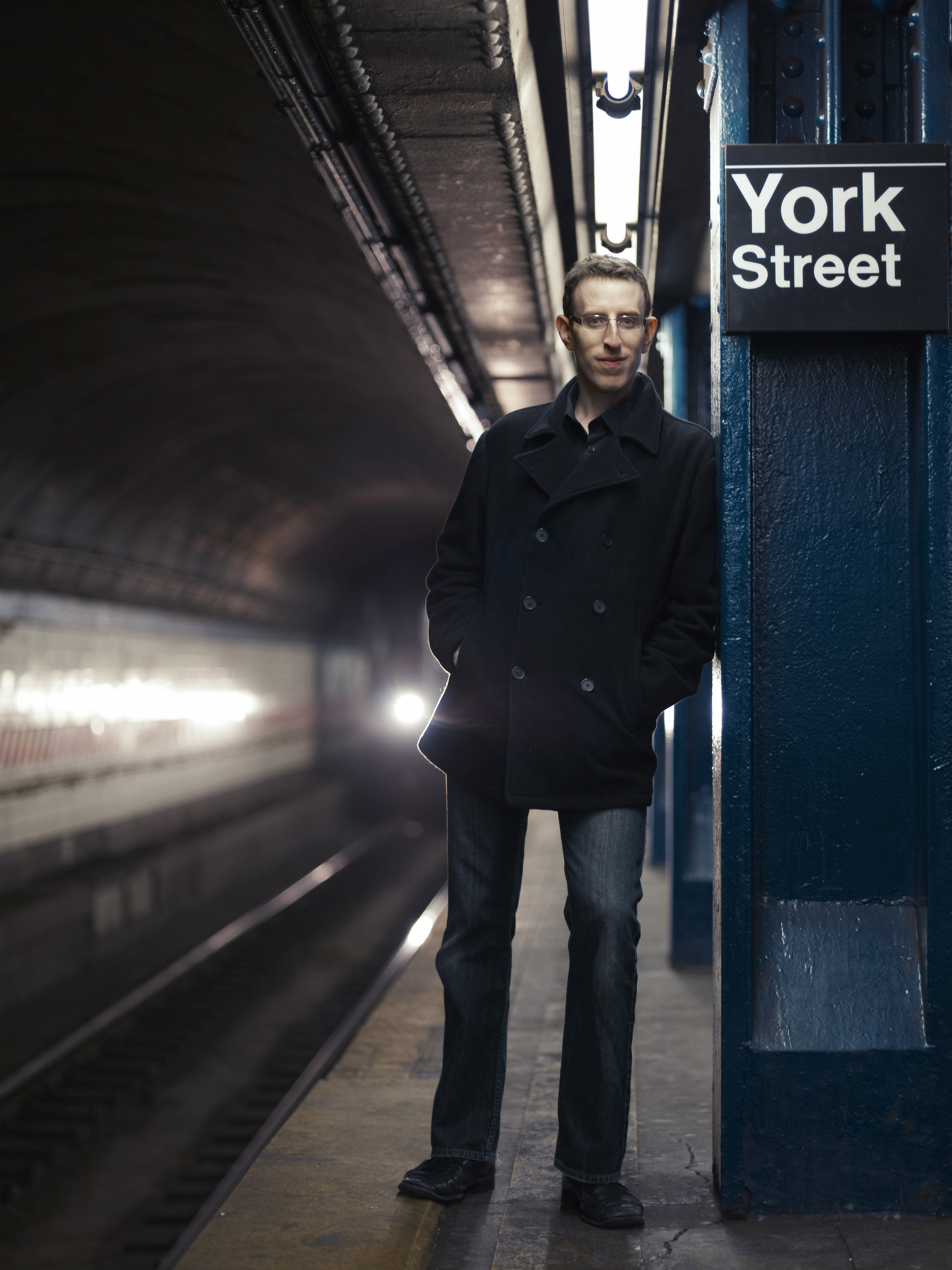
Alan Emanuel Pierson

Alan Emanuel Pierson (born May 12, 1974, Chicago, Illinois) is an American conductor and producer. His parents are Elaine Pierson and Edward S. Pierson, the latter an engineering professor at Purdue University Calumet. In Chicago Pierson took piano and composition lessons at the People's Music School, graduating high school at Francis W. Parker. Pierson is a 1996 graduate of the Massachusetts Institute of Technology with degrees in music and physics. At MIT, he was a timpanist and an assistant conductor with the MIT Symphony Orchestra, and also a composer.

Pierson continued his studies in music at the Eastman School of Music, where he was a co-founder of the new music ensemble Ossia. Subsequently, he was a co-founder of the related new music ensemble Alarm Will Sound, which gave its first concert in 2001. Pierson became the first music director of Alarm Will Sound in the same year, and continues to serve in the post.

In January 2011, Pierson was named the artistic director of the former Brooklyn Philharmonic. When the orchestra suspended operations in 2013 his contract was not renewed. Pierson also serves as principal conductor of the Crash Ensemble in Ireland, and has guest conducted with the Los Angeles Philharmonic, Chicago Symphony, Los Angeles Opera, New World Symphony, Orchestra of St. Luke's, Beth Morrison Projects, Symphoniker Hamburg, and Nationaltheater Mannheim. He is the conductor for the orchestral version of Taylor Mac's 24-Decade History of Popular Music.

Pierson has resided in New York City since 2002. He is currently on faculty at Northwestern University.

In February 2013, Pierson was featured on the Radiolab episode "Speedthoven".

In 2022, the Eastman School awarded Pierson its Centennial Award. In 2026, he received the Grammy award for Best Chamber Music/Small Ensemble Performance for his recording of Donnacha Dennehy's Land Of Winter. He has also received a Grammy nomination for Best Opera Recording for his recording of Mary Kouyoumdjian's Adoration.

Pierson's immersive and durational Steve Reich staging, Music for 18 Musicians: Staged Variations, premiered at The Park Avenue Armory on October 14, 2026.

Preceded by (no predecessor)	Music Director, Alarm Will Sound; 2001–present	Succeeded by incumbent
Preceded by Michael Christie (music director)	Artistic Director, Brooklyn Philharmonic; 2011–2012	Succeeded by Orchestra dissolved
