= The Return of the Spirit =

The Return of the Spirit may refer to:

- The Return of the Spirit (miniseries), a 1977 Egyptian television miniseries, based on the novel
- The Return of the Spirit (novel), a 1927 novel by Tawfiq Al Hakim
