= Crosstalk: American Speech Music =

Compilation album by Various artists
- Released: 2008
- Recorded: 2008
- Genre: Avant-garde
- Length: 70:59
- Label: Bridge Records
- Producer: Mendi Obadike and Keith Obadike

Professional ratings
Review scores
Source	Rating
Allmusic	4/5 stars

Crosstalk: American Speech Music is a compilation album of speech-based music by various composers, poets, visual artists and DJs.

== Track listing ==
1. "Declaratives in First Person" (Pamela Z) – 5:04
2. "Electroprayer 5.0" (Guillermo E. Brown) – 3:27
3. "Africa(n)" (Tracie Morris) – 3:30
4. "In the Basement" (Shelley Hirsch) – 3:08
5. "Chatter of Pins" (Paul Lansky) – 11:19
6. "The Pink of Stealth" (Mendi Obadike, Keith Obadike) – 6:18
7. "Being Black" (DJ Spooky) – 1:15
8. "Blimp/Sky [From One Loss Plus]" (Daniel Bernard Roumain) – 5:02
9. "The Society Architect Ponders the Golden Gate Bridge" (Peter Gordon/Lawrence Weiner ) – 13:40)
10. "Rodeo Red" (Mendi Obadike, Keith Obadike) – 3:10
11. "Morning Blues for Yvan" (George Lewis) – 6:12
12. "Life Studies, Movement #1" (John Link) – 5:12
13. "Redemption Chant 2.0" (Vijay Iyer) – 3:38
