= John Link =

John Link may refer to:

- John Link (composer), American composer
- John "Jack" Link, founder of Jack Link's Beef Jerky
- John F. Link Sr. (1901–1968), American firm director and editor
- John F. Link, son of John F. Link Sr., American film editor
- John Gustave Link, an architect in Montana, United States, who was a partner in Link & Haire
- John Link (runner) (born 1946), American runner, 1966 and 1967 All-American for the USC Trojans track and field team
