= Pamela Z =

American singer (born 1956)

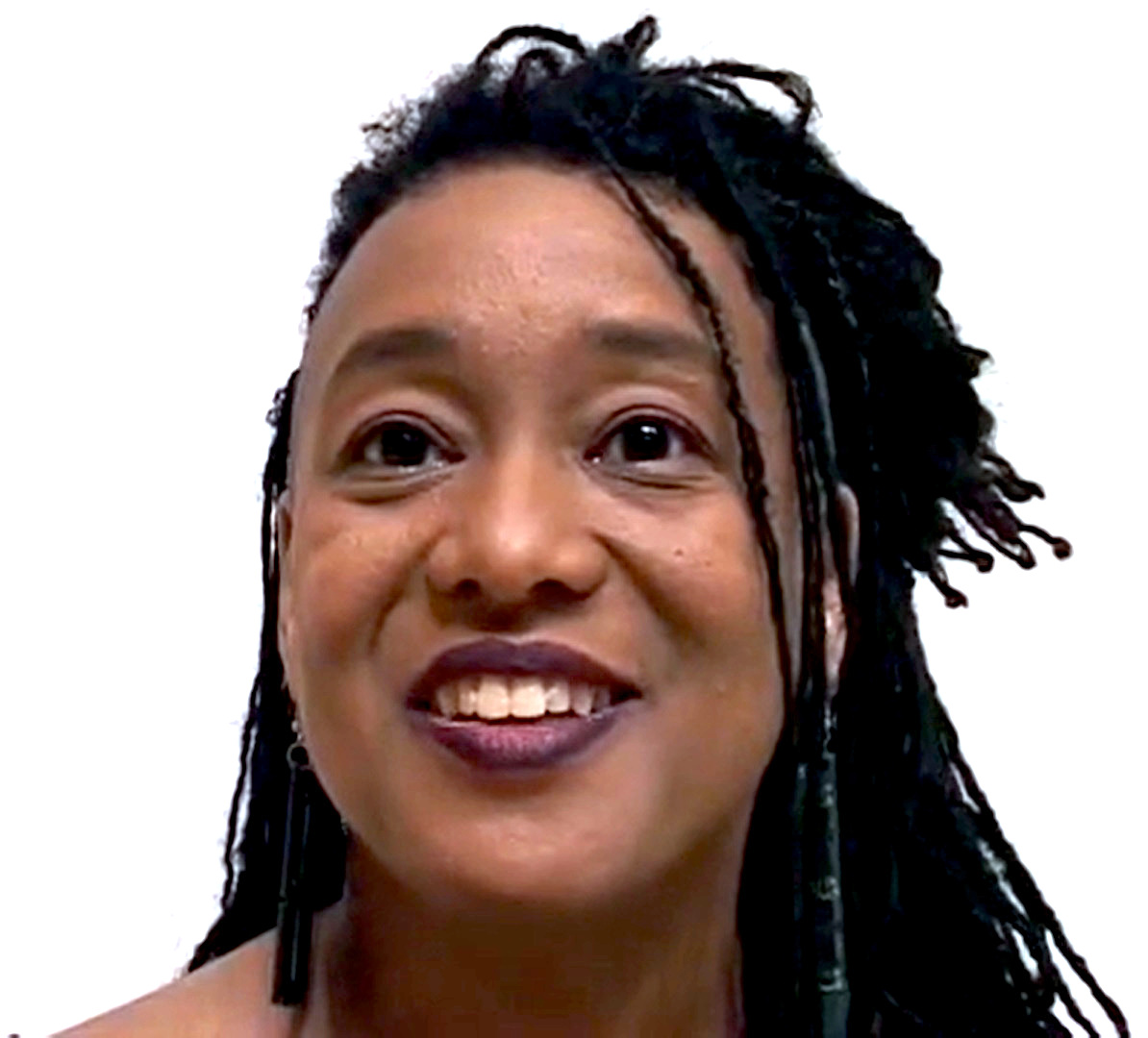
- Pamela Z (c. 2003)

Background information
- Born: 1956 (age 69–70); Buffalo, New York
- Genres: Avant-garde, contemporary classical, experimental, electroacoustic
- Occupations: Composer, performer
- Instruments: Voice, electronics
- Labels: Starkland, Innova, Bridge
- Website: pamelaz.com

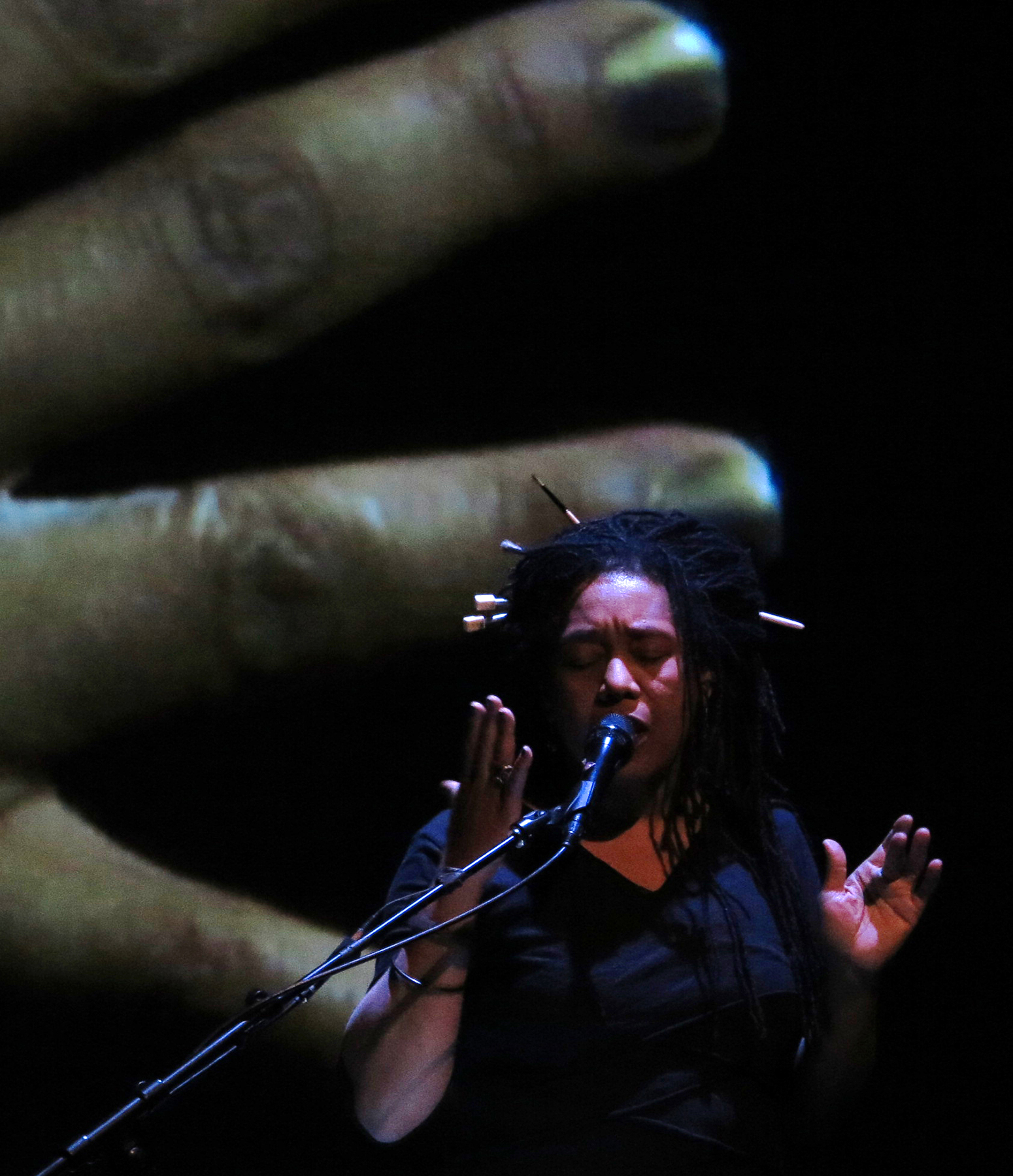
Pamela Z performing at the University of Colorado's ATLAS Institute, Boulder in 2012

Pamela Z (born 1956) is an American composer, performer, and media artist best known for her solo works for voice with electronic processing. In performance, she combines various vocal sounds including operatic bel canto, experimental extended techniques and spoken word, with samples and sounds generated by manipulating found objects. Z's musical aesthetic is one of sonic accretion, and she typically processes her voice in real time through the software program Max on a MacBook Pro as a means of layering, looping, and altering her live vocal sound. Her performance work often includes video projections and special controllers with sensors that allow her to use physical gestures to manipulate the sound and projected media.

Z's solo albums are Echolocation (1987), and A Delay is Better (2004), and A Secret Code (2021). Her fixed-media sound works for radio and new media installations for art galleries have manifested in solo exhibitions at the Museum of Modern Art (MoMA, New York), the Krannert Art Museum (Champaign, Illinois), Savvy Contemporary (Berlin), Trondheim Elektroniske Kunstsenter (Trondheim, Norway), the Fine Arts Center Galleries at Bowling Green State University, and the Chico University Art Gallery (Chico, California), and in group exhibitions in the Dakar Biennale, Sénégal, the Whitney Museum of American Art, San Francisco Arts Commission Gallery, Erzbischöfliches Diözesanmuseum, Cologne, and the McColl Center for Visual Art, Charlotte, North Carolina.

In addition to being a Robert Rauschenberg Foundation Artist in Residence, Z has received a United States Artists fellowship, the American Academy of Arts and Letters Walter Hinrichsen Award, the Rome Prize, a Guggenheim Fellowship, the MIT McDermott Award in the Arts, the Doris Duke Performing Artist Award in theater, the CalArts Alpert Award in the Arts, the Creative Capital Fund, the ASCAP Music Award (for 17 years), the MAP Fund (twice), and an NEA, and Japan/US Friendship Commission Fellowship. Her work and performances have been reviewed in the New York Times, the San Francisco Chronicle, East Bay Express, the Wire, and the Washington Post, among other places.

== Early life and education ==
Born in Buffalo, New York, and raised in the Denver Metro area, Pamela Z received her bachelor's degree in music from the University of Colorado at Boulder in 1978, where she studied classical voice. In the late 1970s and early 1980s, she worked as a singer-songwriter on voice and guitar throughout Colorado under the name Pam Brooks.

== Career ==
After beginning to experiment with digital delay and reverb for live vocal processing in the 1980s and composing new works involving live looping, she relocated to San Francisco in 1984, where she legally changed her last name to Z and became active in the San Francisco Bay Area contemporary music and performance art scene. Throughout the late 1980s and the '90s, she continued to create solo voice and electronics performances, and gained visibility through her appearances in area new music performance venues, theaters, and art galleries. She began touring her work nationally and internationally and, by 2000, she was performing regularly in New York City, Europe, and Japan. Z has performed in such festivals as Bang on a Can at Lincoln Center in New York City, the Interlink Festival in Japan, Other Minds in San Francisco, La Biennale di Venezia in Venice, and Pina Bausch Tanztheater's Festival in Wuppertal, Germany.

In addition to her solo voice and electronics works, Z has composed chamber works commissioned by contemporary music soloists and ensembles such as Kronos Quartet, the Bang on a Can All Stars, Eighth Blackbird, flutist Claire Chase, the New York string quartet ETHEL, Del Sol Quartet, the California EAR Unit, the San Francisco Contemporary Music Players, the Left Coast Chamber Ensemble, and Orchestra of St. Luke's.

In 2013 she was commissioned by the Kronos Quartet to produce a new work, "And the Movement of the Tongue," at the Yerba Buena Center for the Arts. San Francisco Chronicle's music critic Joshua Kosman described the work as "witty and beautifully touching" and "encapsulat[ing] the vivacity" of San Francisco.

The next year she created the soundscape for Jo Kreiter's “Multiple Mary and Invisible Jane,” a free 30-minute show that took place on an 80-foot wall of University of California College of the Law, San Francisco. Z sampled and processed voices of homeless women telling their personal stories. Z has also composed scores for modern choreographers Stephan Koplowitz, Brenda Way (ODC Dance), and Mary Armentrout.

In 2022 Z was one of several composers commissioned by soprano Julia Bullock to create new work for her History's Persistent Voice for the San Francisco Symphony.

In addition, she has composed and recorded film scores for independent filmmakers including Barbara Hammer, Lynne Sachs, Jeanne C. Finley and John Muse.

== Recordings ==
Studio recordings of several of Pamela Z's signature pieces appear on her 2004 solo CD, A Delay is Better on the Starkland label. In addition, a number of her works have been released on various experimental music and sound art compilations including her "Declaratives In First Person" on Crosstalk: American Speech Music a 2008 Bridge Records compilation produced by Mendi + Keith Obadike, and ‘’Geekspeak’’, which appears both on Sonic Circuits IV, a 1996 Innova Recordings compilation and on Bitstreams, a Whitney Museum collection of works from a 2001 sound exhibition curated by Stephen Vitiello. Z also recorded a track for Meredith Monk’s 2012 tribute CD Monk Mix– performing a voice and electronics arrangement of Monk’s ‘’Scared Song’’.

In 2021, her reissue of ‘Echolocation’ was included in the New York Times's list of "5 Classical Music Albums to Hear Right Now." Seth Colter Walls wrote, "Given her skill at live looping and solo concertizing, it’s a treat to hear her in bandleader mode.... Bridging ... diverse reference points, as ever, is Z’s own virtuosic vocal technique, which incorporates both her bel canto training as well as her eclectic listening, across genres."

== Visual art work ==
Pamela Z has created fixed-media sound works for radio and new media installations for art galleries. Her 21-channel sound installation, Simultaneous, and performances of the accompanying multimedia chamber work were presented at the Museum of Modern Art (MoMA, New York) as part of her 2023 Studio Residency. She had a solo exhibition at the Krannert Art Museum in Champaign, Illinois in 2010, the performance component of which she played at Theater Artaud in San Francisco the same year. Other exhibition spaces include Savvy Contemporary (Berlin), the annual New Music Festival at the Fine Arts Center Galleries at Bowling Green State University in 2013, and the Chico University Art Gallery (Chico, California).

Z's installations have been shown in group exhibitions including Walkmen at the Erzbischöfliches Diözesanmuseum in Cologne, Germany in 2000 for which she composed "…and on your left…" to be experienced on headphones, and she presented "Sonic Gestures," a six-channel video installation at TEKS Trondheim Elektroniske Kunstsenter in Trondheim, Norway in 2019. She was included in Bitstreams at the Whitney Museum of American Art in 2001, Dak’Art (Dakar Biennale, Sénégal), side by side/in the world, a 2019 exhibition of California artists addressing the concept of sanctuary at the San Francisco Arts Commission Gallery, and she was an artist-in-residence at the McColl Center for Visual Art, Charlotte, North Carolina in 2002 and 2012.

== Narration work ==
Z is also known for her narration work in independent film and television. Her voice appears in several documentaries including Sam Green's The Weather Underground (2002), Hrabba Gunnarsdottir's Alive in Limbo, and the Bay Area PBS affiliate KQED's 2003-2016 weekly arts television program, Spark.

== Honors and awards ==
Z has received the United States Artists fellowship, the American Academy of Arts and Letters Walter Hinrichsen Award (both 2020), the Rome Prize (2019), the Guggenheim Fellowship (2004); Doris Duke Performing Artist Award in theater (2015); the CalArts Alpert Award in the Arts (1998); the Creative Capital Fund (2002); the ASCAP Music Award (2000-2017); the MAP Fund (2009 and 2012); a SEAMUS Lifetime Achievement Award (2016), and the NEA and Japan/US Friendship Commission Fellowship (1998). In 2008 she was honored as Alumna of the Year by the University of Colorado at Boulder College of Music, and she received a Prix Ars Electronica (Linz, Austria) honorable mention in the Digital Musics Category. In 2017, she was a Robert Rauschenberg Foundation Artist in Residence.

In 2018, the New Interfaces for Musical Expression (NIME) conference established the “Pamela Z Award for Innovation”, an annual prize for recognition of “researchers who are positively contributing to bringing more diversity to the NIME community”.

== Discography ==
=== Solo albums ===
- Echolocation, 1987, ZED, cassette only, out-of-print
- A Delay is Better, 2004, Starkland, CD ST-213
- A Secret Code, 2021, Neuma Records CD 143
- Echolocation (reissue, 2021), Freedom to Spend Vinyl LP FTS-024
- Simultaneous, 2025, Other Minds Records, LP OM3005

=== Compilations ===
- Pearls, the Gem of the Sea on " Komotion International Vol. 11", compilation, 1991, Spirit Records, LP, CD, CS
- State on "State of the Union", compilation produced by Elliott Sharp, 1992, Arrest, CD
- In Tymes of Olde (Z) and Obsession, Additiction and the Aristotelian Curve (Z and Imhoff) on "From A to Z" compilation, Starkland, 1993, CD
- Bald Boyfriend performed by The Qube Chix on "Dice" compilation, 1993, Ishtar, CD
- Geekspeak on "Sonic Circuits IV" compilation, 1996, Innova Recordings, CD
- Parts and Questions/Trip on "Dice 2" compilation, 1996, Ishtar, CD
- Caught on "Emergency Music" compilation, CRI, 1998, CD
- Live/Work on "IMMERSION" compilation, Starkland, 2000, 5.1 surround DVD-audio ST-2010
- Geekspeak on "Bitstreams", compilation curated by Stephen Vitiello, Whitney Museum of American Art, 2001, CD
- 50 for Charles Amirkhanian on "Homo Sonorus" compilation, Kunstradio, 2001, CD
- No. 3 on "Visions", compilation, (2002) EMIT Series, CD
- Pop Titles 'You' on "Deep Wireless 2: New Adventures in Sound Art," 2005, CD
- Declaratives In First Person on "Crosstalk: American Speech Music" compilation produced by Mendi & Keith Obadike, Bridge Records, 2008, CD

=== Tribute CDs ===
- Movements I, II, & III (Peter Kowald), Kowald, Gottschalk, and Z on "Global Village Trio", Free Elephant, 2004, CD
- Postcard From Heaven (John Cage), Victoria Jordanova: harps, Z: voices, Arpaviva, 2006, CD
- Scared Song (Meredith Monk), composer, Monk, arr. & performer, Z on "Monk Mix", House Foundation for the Arts, 2012, CD

=== On others' albums ===
- Ethel, Ethel Dreams of Temporal Disturbances (Z) on "Light", Cantaloupe, 2006, CD CA20137
- Vijay Iyer and Mike Ladd, Still Life with Commentator, Savoy Jazz, 2007
- Lisle Ellis, Sucker Punch Requiem (Ellis: bass, Z: voice & electronics, Oliver Lake: saxophones, George Lewis: trombone, Holly Hoffman: flutes, Mike Wofford: piano, Susie Ibarra: drums & percussion), Henceforth, 2008, CD
- Vijay Iyer and Mike Ladd, Holding It Down: The Veterans' Dreams Project, 2013

== Bibliography ==
- Gann, Kyle American Music in the Twentieth Century (Schirmer Books, 1997) ISBN 002864655X, p. 383
- Borger, Irene. (1999). “The Force of Curiosity” (Interview with Pamela Z). California Institute of the Arts. pp. 299–323.
- Harris, Craig, ed. (1999). “Art and Innovation” (Michael Black, David Levy, and Pamela Z "Artscience Sciencart"), MIT Press, Cambridge, MA/London, England. ISBN 0-262-08275-6. pp. 210–247
- Wilson, Stephen. (2002). Information Arts: Intersections of Art, Science, and Technology (Gesture: Pamela Z). MIT Press, Cambridge MA/ London, England. ISBN 0-262-23209-X. pp. 745–746
- Bulatov, Dmitry, ed. (2001). Homo Sonorus An International Anthology of Sound Poetry . (Pamela Z, USA), the National Center for Contemporary Art, Kaliningrad Branch, Russia.
- Malloy, Judy, ed. (2003). Women in New Media. (Pamela Z: “A Tool is a Tool”) MIT Press, Cambridge MA/London. ISBN 0-262-13424-1. pp. 343–361
- Gray, Herman S. (2004). Cultural Moves: African Americans and the Politics of Representation. American Crossroads. ISBN 0520241444.
- Rothenberg, David. (2005). Why Birds Sing . Basic Books. ISBN 0-465-07135-X. pp. 203–204
- Uitti, Francis-Marie. “Pamela Z”, Contemporary Music Review: IMPROVISATION , Routledge (Taylor & Francis), Edinburgh, Vol. 25, Nos. 5/6 (October/December 2006), pp. 587–589.
- Lewis, George. “The Virtual Discourses of Pamela Z ” Journal of the Society for American Music , Cambridge University Press, Cambridge, MA, Vol. 1, No. 1, (February 2007), pp. 57–77.
- Lane, Cathy (2008). Playing with Words, The spoken word in artistic practice. CRISAP, RGAP, distributed in the U.K. and Europe by Cornerhouse Publications. ISBN 978 0 955 8273 3 4, pages 34–36
- Rodgers, Tara. (2010). Pink Noises: Women on Electronic Music and Sound (Pamela Z, Language, Machines, Embodiment) Duke University Press, ISBN 0822346737.
- Garrett, Charles Hiroshi, ed. (2013). The Grove Dictionary of American Music (Pamela Z). Oxford University Press. ISBN 9780195314281.
- Kelly, Jennifer. (2013). In Her Own Words: Conversations with Composers in the United States . University of Illinois Press, Urbana, Chicago, and Springfield. ISBN 978-0-252-03759-7. pp. 210–227
- Raines, Robert. (2015). Composition in the Digital World: Conversations with 21st Century American Composers . Oxford University Press, New York, NY. ISBN 978-0199357031. pp. 306–316
- Da Rin, Renate (author), Parker, William (author/editor). (2015). giving birth to sound - women in creative music . Buddy's Knife, Köln, Germany. ISBN 978-3000492792. pp. 271–280
- Rutherford-Johnson, Tim (author). (2017). Music after the Fall: Modern Composition and Culture since 1989 . Simpson Imprint in Humanities-University of California Press, Oakland, CA. ISBN 9780520283152.
- Chiriacò, Gianpaolo. (2018). Voci Neri. Mimesis/Eterotopie, Sesto San Giovanni, MI. ISBN 9788857548050. pp. 195–201
- Voegelin, Salomé. (2018). Fragments of Listening: The Political Possibility of Sound. Bloomsbury Academic, London. ISBN 9781501312151.
- Gaston-Bird, Leslie. (2020). Women in Audio. Routledge, New York, NY. ISBN 978-1-138-31601-0. pp. 131–135
