= Mendi & Keith Obadike =

Married Igbo Nigerian American couple

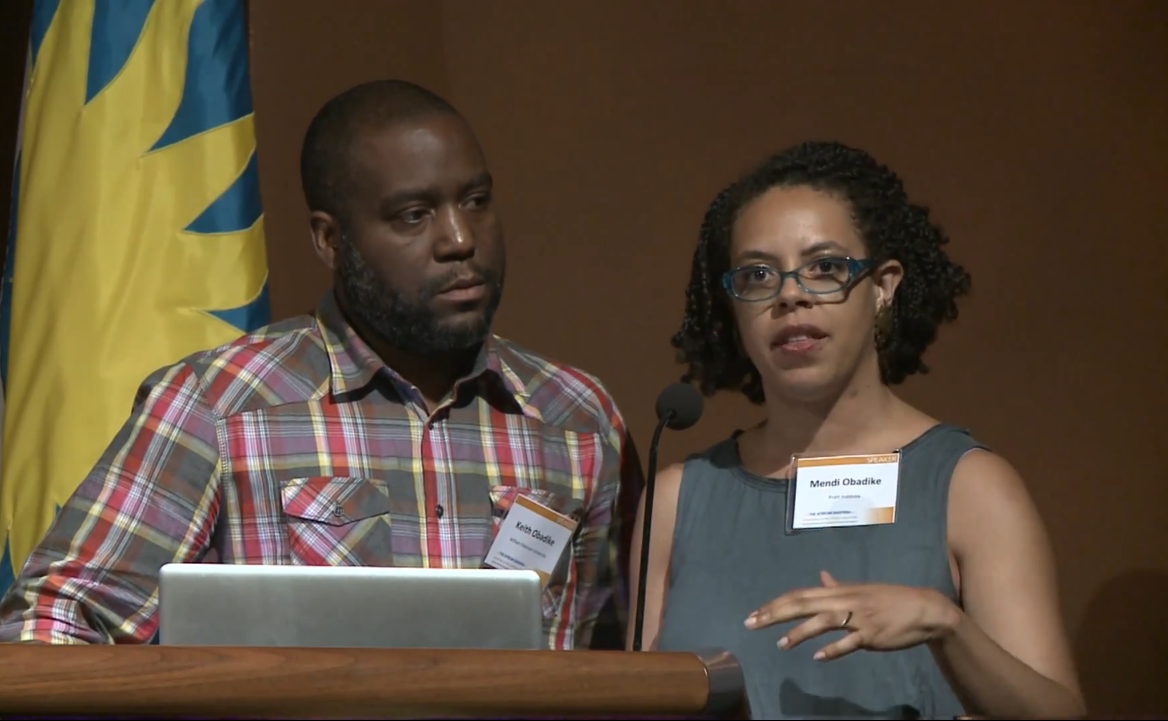
Mendi and Keith Obadike in 2013

Mendi Obadike (née Lewis; born 1973) and Keith Obadike (born 1973) are a Black American couple who are artists and educators, of Igbo Nigerian heritage. They create music, writing, and art. Their music, performance art, and conceptual internet artwork have been exhibited internationally. They are both professors at Cornell University.

Mendi is a poet and Keith is a composer and sound artist, they are married. Their writing and art projects have been featured in Art Journal, Artthrob, Meridians, Black Arts Quarterly, El País and Tema Celeste, in books such as Internet Art (2004) by Rachel Greene, Sound Unbound (2008), edited by DJ Spooky, and featured several times on WNYC's New Sounds since 2007.

== Early lives and educations ==
=== Mendi Lewis Obadike ===
Mendi Lewis Obadike was born in 1973 in Palo Alto, California, while her parents were completing graduate work at Stanford University. She was raised in Nashville. Her mother is Shirley A. R. Lewis, a former president of Paine College with an education background; and her father Ronald McGhee Lewis, was a social worker, professor, and the first director of Black Studies at UC Berkeley. Early on, she experimented making songs with cassette overdubs of her Casio keyboard and computer graphics on a Commodore computer. Later Mendi studied Latin, became fluent in Spanish.

Mendi wrote her first play and edited Focus literary journal while living in Atlanta and studying at Spelman College. She graduated with highest honors in English and was awarded a fellowship to pursue a Ph.D. in Literature and Sound Theory at Duke University, and joined the Cave Canem Poetry Collective. Her poetry book Armor and Flesh (2004) was awarded the Naomi Long Madgett prize from her publisher Lotus Press (now Broadside Lotus Press). She was faculty at Pratt Institute for many years.

=== Keith Obadike ===
Keith A. L. Townsend Obadike was born in 1973 in Nashville, Tennessee. His mother worked as an administrator at the post office and his father (who studied briefly with inventor Buckminster Fuller) was an electrical engineer from Nigeria. While growing up in Nashville, Keith studied classical piano, woodwinds and began programming BASIC on a TRS-80 computer, and worked as a sound designer and producer on the local hip-hop scene. He was subsequently discovered by Kedar Massenburg (Motown Records president) and was signed to MCA records where he worked with R&B artists such as D'Angelo and Angie Stone as well as performed in concert with Lauryn Hill/the Fugees and P-Funk. He later met and was influenced by electronic music composers like Paul Lansky and Olly Wilson while working at Duke University. Keith went on to study painting and digital art at North Carolina Central University and later became the first African-American to earn an MFA in Sound Design from Yale University.

== Career ==
In 1996 Mendi and Keith started making conceptual Internet art and sound art works together with the goal of creating Internet operas. In 1998 they studied the art and conducted interviews with artists in Ghana on electronic media. After requesting sound submissions from friends by email, they created the Uli Suite a sound art piece based on the Igbo abstract art form.

In 2000 they created "My Hands/Wishful Thinking", an Internet art memorial for Amadou Diallo. This work, exhibited at the MIT List Visual Arts Center in the 2001 group show "Race in Digital Space," generated much discussion both online and off when they offered Keith's Blackness for sale on eBay in 2001 as an Internet performance. Mendi also created the minimalist hypertext piece Keeping Up Appearances, the first Black feminist net.art work.

In 2002 Mendi and Keith premiered their Internet opera The Sour Thunder (Bridge Records, Inc.) which featured hypertext writings by literary critic Houston Baker, performance artist Coco Fusco and musician DJ Spooky among others. This was the first new media work commissioned by the Yale Cabaret, and the Obadikes launched The Interaction of Coloreds (commissioned by the Whitney Museum of American Art).

In 2003 Keith worked with playwright Anna Deavere Smith as sound designer and composer for her play Twilight: Los Angeles, 1992 at the Lincoln Center Institute, and Mendi's poetry was featured at the Studio Museum in Harlem in response to an exhibition of visual artist Gary Simmons’ work. Also in 2003 they launched "The Pink of Stealth", an Internet/ DVD surround sound work commissioned by the New York African Film Festival and Electronic Arts Intermix, and The Sour Thunder was broadcast internationally from 104.1 FM in Berlin and was released on CD from Bridge Records in 2004. Keith was also awarded a Connecticut Critics’ Circle Award for his sound design work at the Yale Repertory Theater.

They received a Rockefeller Media Arts Fellowship to develop an installation and album entitled TaRonda Who Wore White Gloves. Their Internet opera, entitled Four Electric Ghosts, was developed for Toni Morrison's Atelier at Princeton University in 2005 and The Kitchen in New York in 2009. They've curated the sound art exhibition "Ya Heard: Sounds from the Artbase" for Rhizome.org and the New Museum of Contemporary Art. Mendi's 2004 book Armor and Flesh (Lotus Press) won the Naomi Long Madgett Poetry Award.

They contributed a chapter to the 2008 Sound Unbound: Sampling Digital Music and Culture (The MIT Press, 2008) edited by Paul D. Miller a.k.a. DJ Spooky. The same year they produced a compilation CD entitled Crosstalk: American Speech Music on Bridge Records. The album features music by Vijay Iyer, Guillermo E. Brown, Shelley Hirsch, George E. Lewis, Pamela Z, John Link, Paul Lansky, Tracie Morris, DJ Spooky, Daniel Bernard Roumain and Peter Gordon/Lawrence Weiner.

== Selected works ==
=== Black.Net.Art Actions ===
Black.Net.Art Actions is a suite of new media works the Obadikes produced between 2001 and 2003 published in re : skin at MIT Press and available at their then-website blackartnet.com. The works include Blackness for Sale (2001), Keeping Up Appearances (2001), The Interaction of Coloreds (2002), and The Pink of Stealth (2003).

==== Blackness For Sale ====
Created in 2001, Keith Obadike's Blackness for Sale was an eBay page advertising the sale of his blackness. An item for sale on the platform typically includes a title or name of the product, a description of its uses, a starting price, and a photograph. For Blackness for Sale, Obadike followed this format replacing the description with a litany of pros and cons of being Black. He gave selling points juxtaposed with “warnings” of the drawbacks of owning a Black identity. The piece furthered the notion that Black people have been homogenized to the point where their experiences have become indistinguishable; to the outside world and the buyer, there is one Black experience. Part of a person is advertised and valued much higher while systematically omitting the other elements that define their personhood. A Black person's most profitable aspect is no longer their physical body but rather other things that encompasses their existence. Black culture has become a new form of capital, the internet where it is exchanged. Black culture can be taken from the internet without having to interact with or acknowledge the Black body, thus erasing Black people. Whereas before, Black people were only valued in capitalist societies for their physical abilities, they are now more so valued for their cultural capital.

==== The Pink of Stealth ====
This six-minute sound piece references the English foxtrot tradition (its title, references the term In the pink) and uses African thumb pianos. The artwork was commissioned as an interactive Web and DVD project by the New York African Film Festival and Electronic Arts Intermix for the 2003 exhibition Digital Africa. It became part of their 2009 album Crosstalk on Bridge Records and was featured on WNYC's New Sounds in 2010.

=== Praise songs and installations ===
A series of Mendi + Keith's works dedicated to other artists.

==== If the Heavens Don't Hear/The Earth Will Hear (2008) ====
This two-song project was originally created for a benefit for the arts center Denniston Hill, founded by Paul Pfeiffer, Julie Mehretu, Lawrence Chua, Beth Stryker, Robin Vachal and kara lynch. For this event Mendi + Keith created their first two praise songs. If the Heavens Don't Hear (A Roller Skating Jam for Marian Anderson) is an R&B song created in honor of the opera singer Marian Anderson. The song was remixed by Gordon Voidwell/WILLS. The Earth Will Hear (for Audre Lorde and Marlon Riggs) was created in honor of the poet Audre Lorde and filmmaker Marlon Riggs.

==== The Good Hand (for Toni Morrison) (2010) ====
The Good Hand is a song written and performed in the style of a folk ballad. In this work the Obadike's set writer Toni Morrison's historic Nobel Prize Lecture to music. The work was included in the book Toni Morrison: Forty Years in The Clearing.

==== Albedo (for Angela Davis) (2014) ====
Albedo is a four-channel sound installation. In the audio recording, a fable is told by a lone voice about an ogre and his battle with the moon. The story is underscored with a droning bassline, the chirping of nocturnal insects and the distant cry of loons. The central wall of the installation is printed with a quote from philosopher and activist Angela Davis on freedom.

==== Blues Speaker (for James Baldwin) (2015) ====
Blues Speaker is a large-scale 24-channel, 12-hour sound work installed in The New School in New York. The piece wraps around the building turning the glass facade of the University Center into a speaker. The artists used their own field recordings from Harlem mixed with original music and excerpts of their performance of James Baldwin's short story "Sony's Blues."

==== Ring Shout (for Octavia Butler) (2016) ====
Ring Shout is a four-channel work made for a gallery context. It uses text from an unpublished story by science fiction writer Octavia Butler combined with swirling atmospheric recordings made by the Obadikes to create a circular sound reminiscent of the African-American folk dance, the ring shout.

=== Americana suites ===
In Big House/Disclosure (2007) Mendi + Keith created an 8-channel sound-installation in Northwestern University's Kresge Hall. It featured an original house song interwoven with oral interviews with 100 Chicago-area citizens about family history, architecture, slavery and house music. The music in the installation was driven by the real-time changing stock prices of contemporary American companies with historical ties to the transatlantic slave trade, discovered under the ordinance required by the city.

In American Cypher the Obadikes use a small bell that belonged to Sally Hemings as a sound source. They recorded Hemings’ bell and used it to create an immersive sound and video installation. The exhibition included a series of letterpress prints and a book of poems and a live performance.

Free/Phase (2014–15) has three components. Part 1: Beacon is a sound installation that played from the rooftop of the Chicago Cultural Center and Stony Island Arts Bank. The piece used a large parabolic speaker to project a narrow beam of sound like a spotlight into the streets of Chicago. It played phrases of freedom songs morning, noon and evening like a church bell or call to prayer. Part 2: Overcome is a video and four-channel sound work. This piece uses sounds from the Edmund Pettus Bridge (the site of 1965's Bloody Sunday) in Selma, Alabama to create a haunting version of the civil right anthem We Shall Overcome. Part 3: In Dialogue with DJs Mendi + Keith invited the public to sit with popular Chicago DJs and have a guided conversation and private listening session using a playlist of freedom songs.

Sonic Migration (2015–16) Part 1: Homes is a video and four-channel sound work. The video shows slow moving imagery of the internal architecture of Tindley Temple, a historic Black Philadelphia church against ambient recording of the structure and Mendi + Keith's remix of the Tindley composition "A Better Home."

Utopias: Seeking For A City (2018-2019) was inspired by free African-American towns created from the early 1800s to the late 1960s in America. Mendi + Keith researched and visited a few of these historic towns across the U.S. making audio and video recordings. This material became the basis for an installation in a mid-19th century house in at Weeksville Heritage Center in Crown Heights, Brooklyn. The installation featured Mendi + Keith's rendition of the African-American spiritual "I am Seeking for A City" playing through the walls, floors and ceiling of the house against a series of Mendi + Keith's framed hand-drawn maps of African-American towns and a video landscapes the towns.

== Books ==
- Mendi Lewis Obadike, Armor and Flesh Detroit: Lotus Press, 2004
- Sound Unbound: Sampling Digital Music and Culture, Paul Dennis Miller also known as DJ Spooky, ed., Boston: MIT Press, 2008, ISBN 9780262633635
- re:skin, Mary Flanagan and Austin Booth, eds., Boston: MIT Press, 2009, ISBN 9780262512497
- Mendi + Keith Obadike, Big House/Disclosure, Berkeley, CA: 1913 Press, 2014
- Mendi + Keith Obadike, Four Electric Ghosts, Berkeley, CA: 1913 Press, 2014
- “Conversations and Utopias: Holger Schulze in Conversation with Mendi + Keith Obadike” in The Bloomsbury Handbook of Sound Art, Sanne Krogh Groth and Holger Schulze, eds., Bloomsbury, 2020
