= A Delay Is Better =

Studio album by Pamela Z
- Released: October 26, 2004
- Recorded: 1986–1997
- Genre: Avant-garde classical
- Length: 1:01:36
- Label: Starkland

A Delay Is Better is a solo album by Pamela Z and was released on the Starkland label in 2004. It has received rotation on WNYC, been the subject of review by an academic journal, speciality music magazines, and included for coverage in a chapter devoted to Pamela Z in a textbook. The album liner notes were written by Pauline Oliveros.

== Musical style and compositions ==
As Pamela Z's first album, A Delay Is Better summarizes her work and development of the preceding two decades. The album contains a variety of explorations of vocal performance utilizing delay effects, found objects, and extended vocal techniques. The music itself, being built around live performance with digital tools such as Max/MSP and the Bodysynth, lead an academic reviewer to suggest the work encompasses an "exocentric body/instrument relationship."

The album features works for voice and delay, found text, and voice with additional processing. Additionally, Feral was written as part of a dance score for Hoist by choreographer Jo Kreiter.

== Track listing ==
All music written by Pamela Z

1. "Bone Music" – 7:14
2. "Badagada" – 3:41
3. "Number 3" – 6:50
4. "Pop Titles 'You'" – 3:10
5. "In Tymes of Olde" – 5:48
6. "The MUNI Section" – 3:52
7. "NEMIZ" – 4:51
8. "Geekspeak" – 7:31
9. "Questions" – 5:30
10. "50 (for Charles Amirkhanian)" – 2:03
11. "Feral" – 5:24
12. "Obsession, Addiction, and the Aristotelian Curve" – 5:08
