= Witch (film) =

1971 film

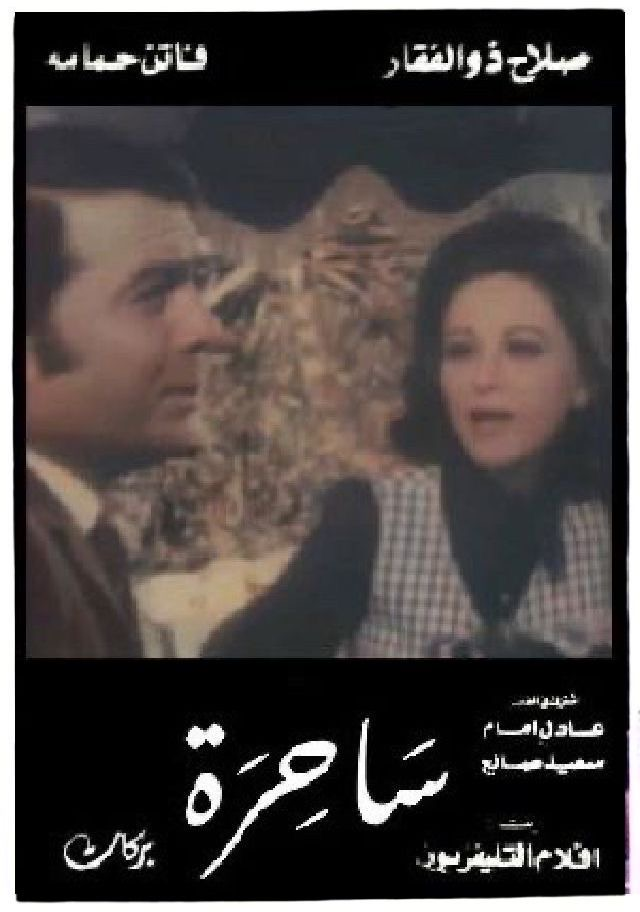
- Film poster
- Directed by: Henry Barakat
- Written by: Tawfiq al-Hakim
- Screenplay by: Ahmed Saleh
- Produced by: Adel Sadek
- Starring: Salah Zulfikar; Faten Hamama
- Cinematography: Abdel Aziz Fahmy
- Edited by: Kamal Abu El-Ela
- Production company: Egyptian Television Network
- Distributed by: Egyptian Television Network
- Release date: 1971
- Running time: 26 minutes
- Country: Egypt
- Language: Egyptian Arabic

Witch (Arabic: ساحرة, translit. Sahira) is a 1971 Egyptian television short film written by Tawfiq al-Hakim and directed by Henry Barakat. It stars Salah Zulfikar and Faten Hamama. The film is produced by Egyptian Television Network.

== Synopsis ==
The events take place in the year 1948, where delusions dominate the mind of Souad and she believes that she can be linked to Ezz El-Din, the man she loves through magic, so she puts a piece of sugar that she brought from one of the impostors in his cup of tea for her lover, Ezz El-Din. She manages to marry him, but the magic turns against the magician, as Ezz El-Din suffers severe pain in his stomach and learns about it.

== Cast ==
- Salah Zulfikar as Ezz El-Din
- Faten Hamama as Souad
- Adel Emam as Waiter
- Saeed Saleh as Waiter
