= Mohammed Fairouz =

Emirati-American composer (born 1985)

- محمد فيروز
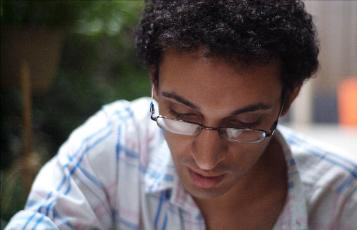
- Fairouz at work on his second symphony in New York City, 2009
- Born: November 1, 1985 (age 41)
- Occupation: Composer
- Years active: 2002–present

Mohammed Fairouz (born November 1, 1985) is an Emirati-American composer.

He is one of the most frequently performed composers of his generation and has been described by Daniel J. Wakin of The New York Times as an "important new artistic voice".

Fairouz began composing at an early age and studied at the New England Conservatory of Music and the Curtis Institute of Music. His teachers included Gunther Schuller, Halim El-Dabh, and John Heiss.

Fairouz lives in New York City.

== Vocal music ==
Fairouz says that he first set the poem "The True Knowledge" by Oscar Wilde to music at the age of 17 and has gone on to write hundreds of art songs and over a dozen song cycles. In Poets & Writers Magazine, he described himself as being obsessed with text.

Three Fragments of Ibn Khafājah was commissioned by the Cygnus Ensemble and sets poetry by Arab Andalucian poet Ibn Khafaja.

Musicians for Harmony commissioned the song cycle Furia for baritone Randall Scarlata together with the Imani Winds and the Borromeo String Quartet and sets Western texts about the Middle East.

Jeder Mensch, was written for Kate Lindsey with texts set from the diaries of Alma Mahler. Lindsey is also the soloist in a 2014 recording of Fairouz's 2012 cycle, Audenesque (in memory of W. B. Yeats), with the LPR Ensemble conducted by Evan Rogister, released in 2015 on the Deutsche Grammophon label (catalog no. B0022417). The disc also features Fairouz's 2013 instrumental work, Sadat.

Fairouz has also collaborated extensively with living poets. Bonsai Journal, on texts by Judson Evans, was released on Albany Records.

Fairouz's theatrical song cycle, written with Wayne Koestenbaum, titled Pierrot was commissioned by the Da Capo Chamber Players.

The Pierrot ensemble, Lunatics at Large commissioned the cycle Unwritten on texts by David Shapiro.

Fairouz has also written an oratorio entitled Zabur, which was premiered by the Indianapolis Symphonic Choir and the Indianapolis Symphony Orchestra in April 2015. Staying true to his focus on text, the work sets a libretto by Najla Said and features text in both Arabic and English. Zabur is scored for a full orchestra, mixed choir, children's mixed choir, tenor soloist, and baritone soloist.

== Operas ==
Sumeida's Song is Fairouz's first opera and is based on the play Song of Death by the Egyptian playwright Tawfiq al-Hakim The opera follows the return of the protagonist Alwan to his Upper Egyptian peasant village, and his attempts to bring modernity to darkness in an effort to break a never ending cycle of violence. The opera also clearly depicts the grave consequences of this pioneering energy. The opera is recorded on Bridge Records.

In May 2015, MSNBC's Morning Joe announced that Mohammed Fairouz would be teaming up with best-selling American author David Ignatius to create a political opera called 'The New Prince' based on the teachings of Niccolò Machiavelli. The opera was commissioned by the Dutch National Opera Speaking with The Washington Post, Ignatius described the broad themes of the opera in terms of three chapters: "The first chapter is about revolution and disorder. Revolutions, like children, are lovable when young, and they become much less lovable as they age. The second lesson Machiavelli tells us is about sexual obsession, among leaders. And then the final chapter is basically is the story of Dick Cheney [and] bin Laden, the way in which those two ideas of what we’re obliged to do as leaders converged in such a destructive way."

Fairouz is also currently at work on a new opera about the lives and deaths of Zulfikar Ali Bhutto and Benazir Bhutto. The opera features Nathan Gunn and Kate Lindsey in the lead roles and the libretto is being written in collaboration with the prominent Pakistani author Mohammed Hanif.

== Orchestral music ==
=== Symphonies ===
Fairouz has written four symphonies. His Third Symphony, Poems and Prayers was commissioned by Northeastern University's Middle East Center for Peace, Culture, and Development and is cast for solo voices, mixed chorus and orchestra. The Symphony sets the texts of Arab poets such as Fadwa Tuqan and Mahmoud Darwish, the Israeli poet Yehuda Amichai, as well as prayers such as the Aramaic Kaddish. The Third Symphony was premiered on February 16, 2012, by conductor Yoon Jae Lee, mezzo-soprano Rachel Calloway, Baritone David Kravitz, Ensemble 212 and The Young New Yorkers Chorus at the Miller Theater at Columbia University.

Fairouz's Fourth Symphony In the Shadow of No Towers is scored for wind ensemble and is inspired by Art Spiegelman's graphic novel of the same title. The symphony explores American life in the aftermath of 9/11. It was described by The New York Times as "technically impressive, consistently imaginative and in its finest stretches deeply moving". The symphony has been recorded on Naxos Records by the University of Kansas Wind Ensemble, under the direction of Dr. Paul Popiel.

The final movement of Fairouz's First Symphony Homage to a Belly Dancer is based on an essay by Edward Said about the Egyptian belly dancer Tahia Carioca.

=== Concertos ===
Fairouz's Cello Concerto was written for Israel-born cellist Maya Beiser for the Detroit Symphony Orchestra. It was premiered by the Orchestra under the direction of Leonard Slatkin.

Fairouz has written a violin concerto called Al-Andalus for Rachel Barton Pine and the Alabama Symphony Orchestra. The concerto was praised at its premiere for containing "some of the most melancholy and nostalgic writing heard yet among ASO's new music projects".

Fairouz's Double Concerto for Violin, Cello and orchestra States of Fantasy was commissioned by New York-based orchestra Ensemble 212. It is inspired by Jacqueline Rose's book of the same title and was written for violinist Nicholas Kitchen and cellist Yeesun Kim of the Borromeo String Quartet.

Fairouz has also written a clarinet concerto, Tahrir, for David Krakauer. The work takes its title from Tahrir Square in Cairo, Egypt. This piece was commissioned by a group of alumni of NYC's Wagner Junior High School in memory of teacher Herb Greenhut. Krakauer is also a Wagner alum.

Akhnaten, Dweller in Truth, a dance scene for cello and orchestra, takes its name from Naguib Mahfouz's book of the same title.

== Chamber and solo music ==
Fairouz's Wind Quintet, Jebel Lebnan, written for the Imani Winds, musically chronicles events from the Lebanese Civil War. The Imani Winds recorded the work for Naxos Records.

His Lamentation and Satire for string quartet was recorded by the Borromeo String Quartet for release on GM/Living Archive Recordings.

His string quartet, The Named Angels, was also written for the Borromeo String Quartet. The work, about the mythology of angels in Middle Eastern Folklore, has been recorded by the Del Sol Quartet on the Sono Luminus record label.

Fairouz has written a sonata for unaccompanied violin (2011) called Native Informant for Rachel Barton Pine. Native Informant is the title work of a Naxos Records album of Fairouz's chamber music.

== Recordings ==
- 2008 – Boston Diary (Albany Records TROY1176)
- 2010 – As It Was, Is, and Will Be (GM Recordings GM 2080) by Borromeo String Quartet
- 2011 – Critical Models (Dorian Sono Luminus DSL 92146)
- 2012 – Sumeida's Song (Bridge Records Bridge 9385)
- 2013 – Native Informant (Naxos Records Naxos 8.559744)
- 2013 – In the Shadow of No Towers (Naxos Records Naxos 8.573205)
- 2014 – Poems and Prayers (Dorian Sono Luminus DSL 92177)
- 2015 – Follow, Poet (Deutsche Grammophon B0022417)
- 2015 – Scrapyard Exotica (Sono Luminus DSL-92193) by Del Sol String Quartet

== Works ==
- Duo for Piano and Violin (2002), for piano and violin
- The True Knowledge (2002), for soprano and violin
- Elegy for Edward Said (2003), for violin and cello
- Piano Prelude no. 1 (2003), for piano
- Piano Prelude no. 2 (2003), for piano
- Piano Prelude no. 3 (2004), for piano
- Naaman's Song (2004), for soprano, tenor and chamber orchestra
- Four Haiku Poems (2004), for tenor and piano
- Memoriam (2004), for string orchestra
- The 89th Street Rag (2004), for clarinet and piano
- Cello Sonata "Elegiac Verses" (2005), for cello and piano or piano, cello, actor, singer and dancer
- Two Sonnets and a Closing Couplet (2005), for harp
- Piano Miniature no.1 "Nocturnal Snapshot" (2005), for piano
- Piano Prelude no.4 (2005), for piano
- Piano Miniature no. 2 (2005), for piano
- Piano Miniature no. 3 (2005), for piano
- Elegy for David Diamond (2005), for violin and cello
- Piano Miniature no. 4 (2005), for piano
- The Stolen Child (2005), for baritone and piano
- Canto (2005), for violin, viola, cello, double bass and piano
- Chamber Symphony no. 1 "Sabra" (2005), for chamber orchestra and actors
- Panopticon (2006), for tenor and piano
- Requiem Mass (2006), for mixed chorus
- Piano Miniature no. 5 (2006), for piano
- Elegy for Naguib Mahfouz (2006), for violin and cello
- Three Shakespeare Songs (2006), for clarinet, bassoon, trumpet, trombone, harp, mezzo-soprano, violin and double bass
- Two Short Diversions (2006), for saxophone and harp
- Piano Sonata "Reflections on Exile" (2007), for piano
- Lan Abkee (2007), for mezzo-soprano and piano
- Litany (2007), for flute, oboe, clarinet, bassoon and double bass
- Collisions (2007), for percussion ensemble
- Symphony no. 1 "Symphonic Aphorisms"" (2007), for orchestra
- Bonsai Journal (2007), for high soprano and piano
- Lamentation and Satire (2008), for string quartet
- Three Novelettes (2008), for alto saxophone and piano
