= Poems and Prayers =

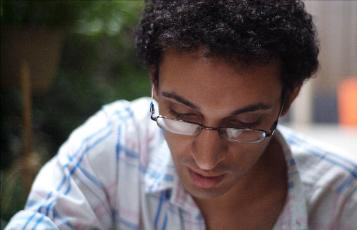
Mohammed Fairouz in 2009

Poems and Prayers is Mohammed Fairouz's third symphony. It sets texts in Arabic, Aramaic and Hebrew for choir, solo voices and orchestra and explores the Arab-Israeli Conflict. The symphony was commissioned by the Middle East Center for Peace, Culture and Development at Northeastern University. It was completed in 2010.

== Instrumentation ==
The symphony is scored orchestra, a mixed choir and two soloists (mezzo-soprano and baritone).

Woodwinds

2 flutes
2 oboes
2 clarinets
2 bassoons

Brass
4 French horns in F
2 trumpets
3 trombones

Percussion

Voices
mezzo-soprano solo
baritone

mixed chorus

Strings
harp

violins I and II
violas
violoncellos
double basses (with low C extension)

== Form ==
The piece consists of four movements and two interludes:

1. Kaddish
2. Lullaby
  Minyan
3. Night Fantasy
  Oseh Shalom
4. Memorial Day for the War Dead

== Composition and premiere ==
Poems and Prayers lasts 60 minutes. The symphony sets poetry by Israeli poet Yehuda Amichai alongside Palestinian poets Mahmoud Darwish and Fadwa Tuqan against the backdrop of the Kaddish,.

The work was given its world premiere at Columbia University's Miller Theatre.

== Recording ==
A recording of Poems And Prayers was released together with Fairouz's clarinet concerto "Tahrir" on the Sono Luminus record label in May 2014.
