= John Link (composer) =

American composer

John Link is a New York composer and is one of the founders of Friends and Enemies of New Music.

Link received a Ph.D. in music from the Graduate Center of the City University of New York, a master's degree from The Ohio State University, and B.M. and B.A. degrees from the University of Nebraska–Lincoln. He studied composition with David Olan, Thomas Wells, and Randall Snyder.

In 1989 he and a group of composers – Tom Cipullo, Nancy Gunn, Cynthia Miller, Gregory W. Pinney, and Ben Yarmolinsky — formed Friends & Enemies of New Music, a composers group that put on a series of contemporary music concerts in New York City and sponsored an annual competition.

In 2007 his composition For Irving Lippel, performed by Jeffrey Irving and Daniel Lippel appeared on the album Sustenance (New Focus Recordings) and in 2008 an excerpt of his work Life Studies was included on the compilation album Crosstalk: American Speech Music (Bridge Records) produced by Mendi + Keith Obadike.

In 2009 his composition Around the Bend appeared on the album FM by Flexible Music (New Focus Recordings).

He is currently a Professor of Music at William Paterson University directing the Center for Electroacoustic Music.

Link has also published several articles and two books on the music of the American composer Elliott Carter (1908-2012). In 2000, his book Elliott Carter: A Guide to Research was published by Garland Press (now Taylor and Francis). In 2012 his essay Elliott Carter's Late Music was published in the collection Elliott Carter Studies, which he co-edited with Marguerite Boland, published by Cambridge University Press.

He also participated in several events surrounding the Elliott Carter centenary in 2008, including panel discussion at the Tanglewood Music Center and the Chamber Music Society of Lincoln Center. In 2011 Link was invited to present an international workshop: "Elliott Carter's Tempo e tempi," at the University of Slovenia in Ljubljana, as part of the 2011 Festival Slowind.

== Discography ==
- Around the Bend on the album Flexible Music
- Life Studies, movement 1 on the album Crosstalk presented by Mendi + Keith Obadike
- For Irving Lippel on the album Sustenance
- Clarinet Fantasy on the album 60x60 2004-2005
