= Sumeida's Song =

2008 opera

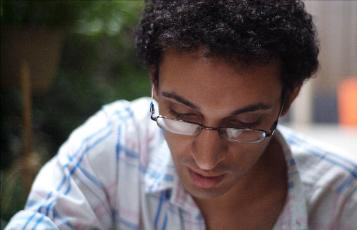
Mohammed Fairouz in 2009

Sumeida's Song is an opera in three scenes by Mohammed Fairouz adapted from the play Song of Death by Egyptian playwright Tawfiq al-Hakim. It is Fairouz's first opera, completed in 2008 when he was 22 years old.

== Performance history ==
The first staged production of the opera opened the 2013 Prototype: Opera/Theater/Now festival in New York City and was billed as "the first Arab-American opera to be fully produced on an American stage." The opera was co-produced by Beth Morrison Projects and Here Arts Center.

Sumeida's Song received concert performances at Carnegie Hall and the New York Society for Ethical Culture before its first staging.

== Roles ==
Role	Voice type	Premiere cast, 9 January 2013 (Conductor: Steven Osgood)
Mabrouka	soprano	Amelia Watkins
Alwan	baritone	Daniel Kempson
Asakir	mezzo-soprano	Rachel Calloway
Sumeida	tenor	Edwin Vega

== Synopsis ==
The three scenes of Sumeida's Song are set in a peasant house in a peasant village in Upper Egypt.

== Recording ==
A recording of Sumeida's Song was released on Bridge Records on October 29, 2012.

== Reception ==
Reviewing the first staged performance for The New York Times, Anthony Tommasini described Sumeida's Song as "an intensely dramatic 60-minute four-character opera with a searing score that deftly draws from Arabic and Western contemporary musical sources.". He went on to note that "Mr. Fairouz’s multilayered music catches the complexities and crosscurrents of this family and the grim realities of their lives" and described Fairouz as having "hints of various Western contemporary idioms in his musical language: American neo-Romanticism; stretches of near-atonality that evoke Berg; astringent washes of sounds that seem inspired by Ligeti, who was one of Mr. Fairouz’s teachers. Yet the Arabic elements of his style — microtonal modes, spiraling dance rhythms, plaintive melodic writing — give fresh, distinctive jolts to the Western elements."

On disc, Sumeida's Song was noted by WQXR-FM as "a lushly scored chamber opera, (completed when Fairouz) was only 22. Its concerns with peace and communal healing place it in the humane tradition of such works as Verdi’s Simon Boccanegra and Don Carlos."
