= A Sparrow from the East =

1938 novel by Tawfiq al-Hakim

- Author: Tawfiq al-Hakim
- Language: Arabic
- Genre: Novel
- Publication date: 1938
- Publication place: Egypt

A Sparrow from the East (Arabic: Usfur min Sharq) is a novel written by Egyptian author Tawfiq al-Hakim in 1938. It narrates the life of Muhasin, an Arab, in Paris, France, and his encounter with the Western modernity. It can be argued that the persona of Muhsin is similar to those of Tawfiq when he was in Paris in 1925 for doing his PhD.

== Themes ==
The word Usfur means sparrow, which can be interpreted as a traveler between the East (Egypt) to the West (France). As argued by Al-Ajrami and Al-Muhiesen, "The setting of the novel takes place before the Second World War to portrait the status of France at that time when poverty and unemployability spread wide in France so it presents a true reflection of the French society at that time. We cannot limit the scope of the novel on a failed love relationship between the narrator and the heroine of the novel as the main theme of it revolves around the eastern boy’s perplexity in Paris and the conflict between the eastern and western cultures, imagination and reality, heart and mind, spirituality and materialism. By the end of the novel, Al-Hakim criticizes the consequences of industrialism in the west, slavery, and turning humans into machines".

== Review ==
According to Hassan, "In this novel, al-Hakim exposes the conflict, collision and division between East and West, as a culture and as a civilization. It depicts the cultural interaction between them, as it depicts the influence of the ancient civilization of the East on Europe and the modern civilization of the West on the East... In sum, Tawfiq al-Hakim represents among the dialogues between these two characters in his novel A Sparrow from the East the cultural distance between the East and the West and proves that whatever the good deeds, found in western culture are taken from the East, but in fact, the East has lost most of its identity in the modern era after the West‟s occupation in it. The reality is that the cultural colonialism occurred alongside imperial colonialism".
