= Arab television drama =

Arabic-language TV melodrama

An Arab television drama or Arab soap opera (also known as musalsal (Arabic: مسلسل), plural musalsalat (Arabic: مسلسلات) is a television form of melodramatic serialized fiction. The musalsalat are similar in style to Latin American telenovelas. They are often historical epics about Islamic figures or love stories involving class conflict and intrigue. The word musalsal literally means "chained, continuous".

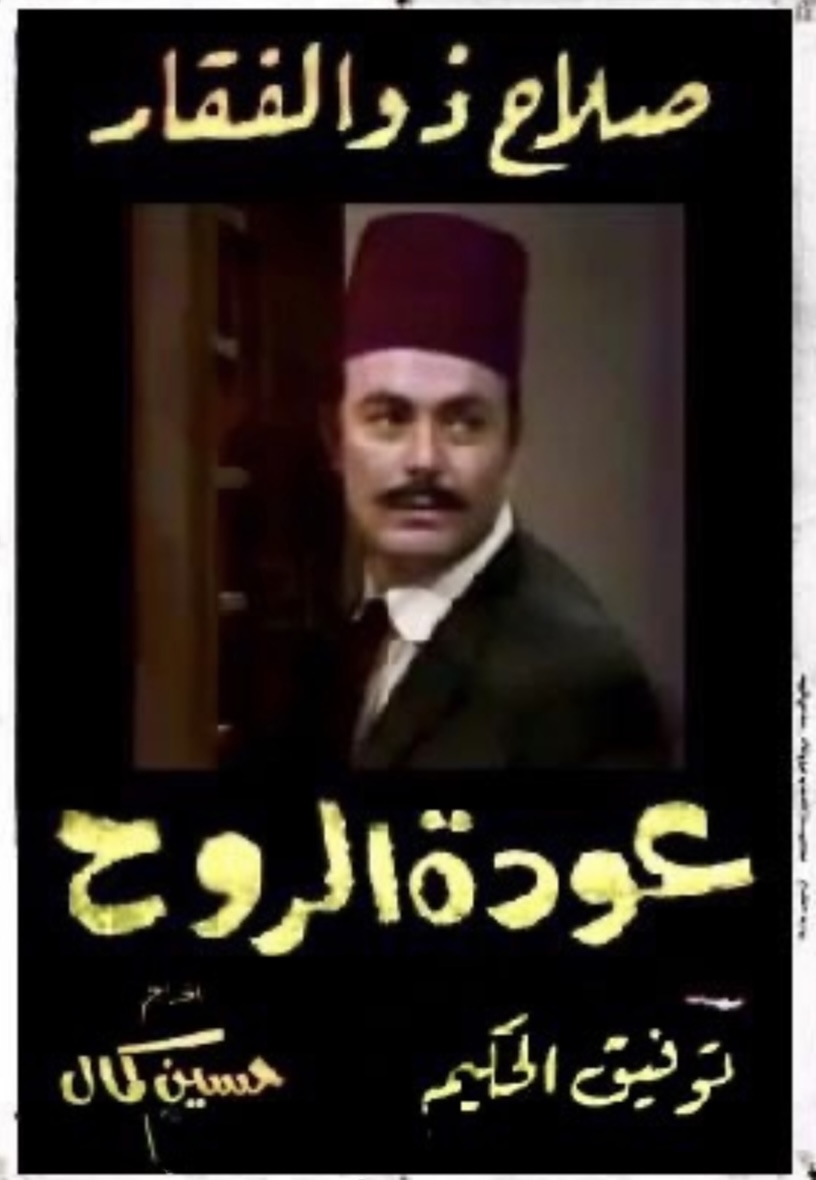
Publicity photo for the Egyptian miniseries The Return of the Spirit (1977)

During the evenings of the month of Ramadan, after the Iftar meal is eaten to break the day's fast, families across much of the Arab world watch these special dramas on television. Arab satellite channels broadcast the programs each night, drawing families who have gathered to break their fast. Most musalselat are bundled into about 30 episodes, or about one episode for each night of Ramadan. These television series are an integral part of the Ramadan tradition, the same way the hakawati, the storyteller who recounted tales and myths, was part of Ramadan nights in the past.

According to the market research firm Ipsos, during the first two weeks of Ramadan 2011 television figures rose across the Middle East by 30%, and as many as 100 Arab soap operas and shows broadcast on state and private channels. The Ramadan season has been compared to a month-long Super Bowl for its importance in the Arab world's television market. During this period, television ratings remain high well into the night, and the cost of a 30-second advertisement during peak Ramadan viewing hours can be more than double the normal rate. According to the Pan Arab Research Center, the amount spent in 2012 for Ramadan television advertising exceeded a forecast of US$420 million, out of an estimated $1.98 billion for the total Arab television advertising market for the same year.

In 2012, YouTube announced a new online channel specifically dedicated to showing Ramadan shows.

== Egypt ==
=== Ramadan and Egyptian TV dramas ===
In Egypt, musalsalat are designed to air for the first time during Ramadan, and to last for the entire month. As a result, television stations wind up rerunning musalsalat throughout the year, as barely any other musalsalat are produced. As such, Egyptian TV Dramas play a major role in Egyptian society, in that it heavily shapes and influences the culture, by curating both religious and modern content. This mixture of conservative thinking with contemporary business approaches proves controversial to critics. On the one hand, the content of programs does not align with the religious tone of Ramadan. Critics argues that the commercialization of Ramadan turned the holy month into "a month of self-denial" – where audiences are not spiritually in touch with God – rather than a month of self-awareness and deep reflection. On the other hand, the commercialization of Ramadan and TV programming is seen to be a natural process as Egyptians are increasingly adopting more Westernized lifestyles due to Egypt's developing economy. Because the Ramadan lifestyle guarantees the penetration of a large audience, prominent advertisers produce specific campaigns to air for the first time, despite the doubled advertising rates during that period. Additionally, the ads are seen to promote consumption, which goes against the spirit of Ramadan: which is to share and to be charitable. The commercials usually provide unattainable or unrealistic dreams for the urban and rural poor.

=== History of Egyptian TV programming ===
Television programming has continuously shaped the Egyptian national identity and the role of audiences. In the 1960s and 1970s, Egyptian TV programming was largely tied to the nationalist and developmentalist agenda of the government under President Nasser. Beginning the 1990s, TV programming witnessed a shift from developmentalist values – including social welfare and national progress – to capitalist values. The discourse of national development was challenged by globalization as the Egyptian government began to espouse privatization and market reform. Private corporations began to provide funds for the production of serials and advertisements, including but not limited to the salaries of stars, extravagant sets, props, and location shoots. Competition between brands was encouraged and thus, commercials began gaining larger time slots on television that that granted to serials. Instead of treating audiences as "citizens", Egyptian media began to treat audiences as "consumers". Today, there are two ways through which consumerism relates to Egyptian melodramas: the first being the fascination with and admiration of actors and actresses – referred to as "stars" by viewers; and the second being television commercials. In 2012, Egyptian television channels had more than 50 soap operas on offer, for a combined production cost estimated at a record E£1.18 billion.

=== Egyptian Musalsalat: A Social Construction of Reality ===
Egyptian serials are well placed at the heart of Egyptian society, examining all areas of the society. They tackle prevalent social and political issues – such as corruption and oppression – in a way that allows individuals and families to relate to the events or characters of the musalsal. In their crafting of being relatable, but also distant, drama serials serve as a medium to spread information among and to educate the masses. They allow for the construction of a multifaceted understanding of the current social reality. They invite the audience to evaluate current issues, from different viewpoints, as they can relate to certain aspects, while also being entertained, as the serials provide a certain distance between viewers and actors. That being said, television serials have a social responsibility, especially in a developing country, to teach its viewers on the different ways one can achieve happiness.

==== Common themes ====
Egyptian soap operas usually follow a main character as he or she struggles to gain recognition and his or her position in society. As such, excessive consumption and desire for money at any cost are themes that appear in storylines, usually leading characters to engage in illegal and corrupt practices, such as bribery, embezzlement, and drug dealing. Storylines typically emphasize the vulnerability of the younger generation to obtaining financial security through marriage, engaging in illegal or demeaning work, or turning to drug dealing and addictive consumption. In these cases, serials serve as tools to teach Egyptian society of the financial burden the youth carries. Another representation in relation to money that has dominated in Egyptian cinema and television drama is marking the contrast between rich and poor, often portrayed as corrupt versus noble. Egyptian television programming provides a paradox between attempting to teach society of the realities of gaining money through immoral and illegal means, while constantly being exposed, and subjected to luxurious and extravagant lifestyles.

==== International recognition ====
On 15 March 2018, Netflix added the first Egyptian series Grand Hotel under the name "Secret of the Nile", with English, French, German, Italian, and Spanish subtitles. It is also the first Arabic series released on the online streaming service. Produced by Egypt's CBC, the TV series is an Egyptian equivalent of the Spanish drama television series "Gran Hotel" and was aired during Ramadan 2016.

== Kuwait ==
Kuwait's television drama industry tops other Gulf drama industries and produces a minimum of fifteen serials annually. Kuwait is the production center of the Gulf television drama and comedy scene. Most Gulf television drama and comedy productions are filmed in Kuwait. Kuwaiti soap operas are the most-watched soap operas in the Gulf region. Soap operas are most popular during the time of Ramadan, when families gather to break their fast. Although usually performed in the Kuwaiti dialect, they have been shown with success as far away as Tunisia.

== Lebanon ==
Lebanese drama series lag significantly behind the more popular Syrian or Egyptian productions, a lack of popularity thought to be caused primarily by weak scripts. Lebanese television tends to focus on reality television, shows with interviewing/talks shows, comedy, and so on rather than soap operas. Lebanese series also face challenges because of low budgets and an absence of government support. Because of the war in Syria, some Syrian production companies have relocated their projects to Lebanon.

== Syria ==
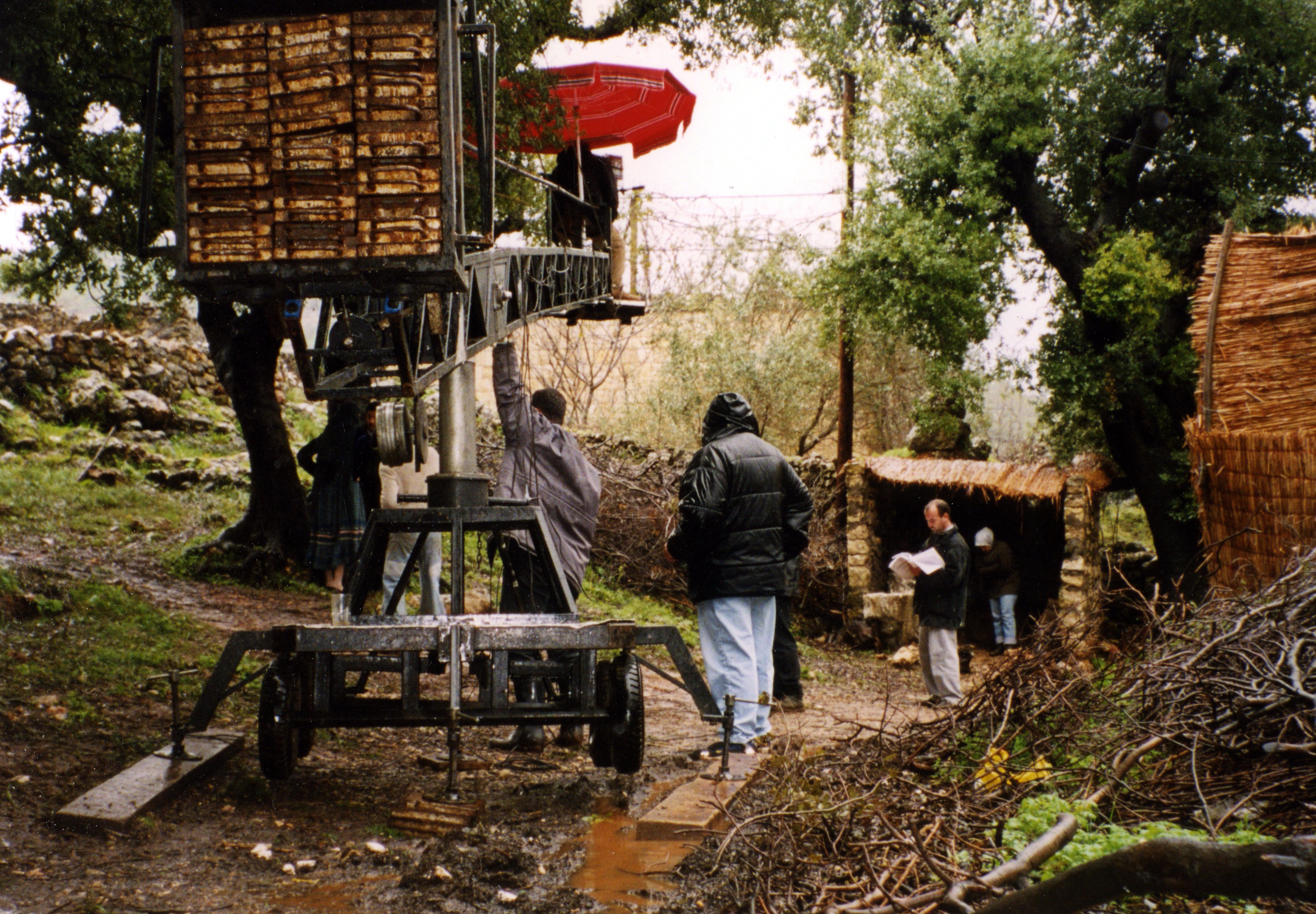
Film set of the series Unshoodat Al Matar

Syrian soap operas took off in the 1990s, when satellite-television access increased across the Arab world, and were watched by tens of millions of people from Morocco to the Persian Gulf. As a consequence of the Syrian Civil War, Syrian production companies have shelved new shows and viewers throughout the Arab world have called for a boycott of Syrian satellite channels. A tax break issued by the government has failed to revive the industry. In 2010, some 30 Syrian soaps were aired during Ramadan, some only in Syria, but most on pan-Arab satellite channels.

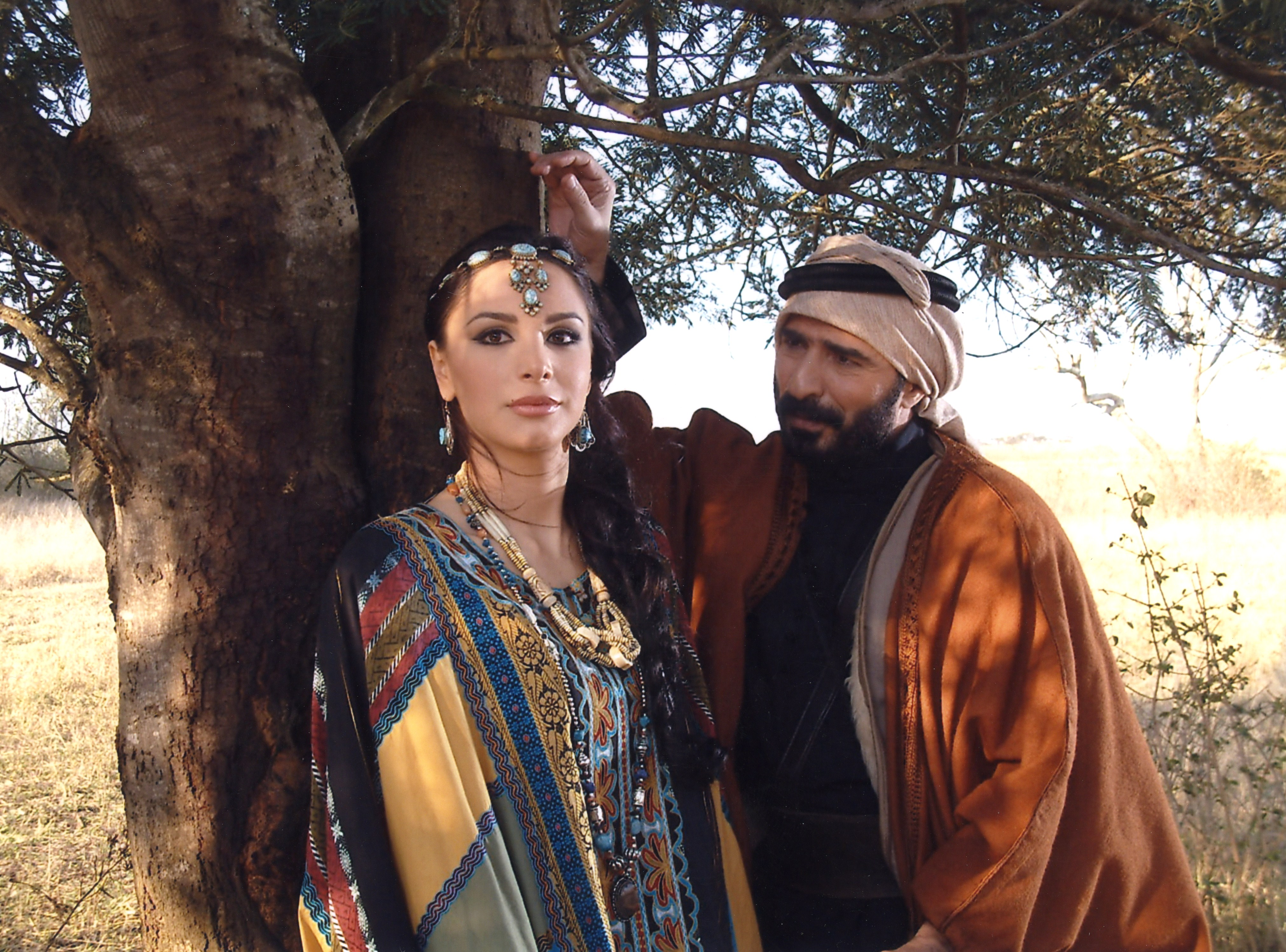
Joelle Behlok and Rasheed Assaf in the drama series The Last Cavalier

Syrian series have become one of the country's most prized exports, and are very popular in the Persian Gulf countries.

Many Syrian actors, producers and directors left the country; many film sets have been destroyed or made inaccessible by the fighting. By 2014 only 20 Syrian series were being made, compared to the 40 produced in 2010.

== Jordan ==
Jordan produces a number of "Bedouin Soap Operas" that are filmed outdoors with authentic props. The actors use Bedouin-accented Arabic to make the story feel more authentic. These musalsalat have become popular in Saudi Arabia and Iraq.

In musalsalat that center around traditional village life during the time period just before World War II. Oftentimes, these dramas are permeated by themes of tension between the traditional and modern ways of life with specific emphasis on the patriarchal systems and the role of women within them. Unique to this particular type of musalsal is the willingness of the shows' creators to confront sensitive issues such as honor killing. Another musalsal genre is that of the historical drama. Topics of these shows range from pre-Islamic poets to the Soviet invasion of Afghanistan. Many of these are joint productions by Jordanian, Syrian, and Persian Gulf region television producers. According to a survey of Jordan's television viewers, 92.5% prefer watching Syrian dramas while 61.6% prefer Egyptian ones. This is compared to 26.6% who prefer watching Jordanian drama series.

While the aforementioned musalsalat target a broader, Arabic-speaking audience, certain programs target Jordanians specifically. These shows tend to deal with social and political issues particular to present-day Amman. Acting in these programs, as well as Jordanian musalsalat in general, is often lauded as being superior to that of many Egyptian-produced soap operas.

== See also ==
- The Return of the Spirit
- List of Egyptian television series
- List of Lebanese television series
- List of Syrian television series
