= Paul Dresher =

American composer

Paul Joseph Dresher (born January 8, 1951, in Los Angeles) is an American composer.

Paul Dresher was born and raised in Pacific Palisades, Los Angeles. From an early age, he was surrounded by music, deeply influenced by the sounds of Elvis Presley, as well as the folk and blues revivals that defined the 1960s. Rock and roll was an integral part of his formative years, and he began immersing himself in music in 1965–1966.

Dresher's musical upbringing was diverse. In addition to popular music, he was exposed to classical and contemporary classical music. His father, a mathematics professor at UCLA, was a passionate music enthusiast who often took his son to concerts and operas in Los Angeles, particularly at Schoenberg Concert Hall.

Classically trained in piano from a young age, Dresher later developed a keen interest in world music during his teenage years. He began studying Indian music and listening extensively to music from Indonesia and other global traditions. Concurrently, he explored the technical side of music by experimenting with home tape recorders—reversing tape, overdubbing, manipulating speeds—and later delved into feedback after being influenced by Jimi Hendrix. These explorations marked the beginning of his interest in electronic music and manipulating sound beyond conventional performance techniques.

During his high school years, Dresher made a significant shift in focus, abandoning math classes to pursue woodworking. In 1968, he built his first musical instrument, crafting psychedelic guitars and sitars. This marked the start of his lifelong interest in instrument-building, later inspired by figures such as Harry Partch and Lou Harrison, as well as global musical traditions.

Dresher's intellectual curiosity extended into avant-garde and experimental music. He became aware of composer John Cage during his teenage years but did not develop a strong interest in Cage’s work until the age of 18, after reading Silence, Cage’s influential collection of writings. While the book had a profound impact on him, it also posed intellectual challenges, particularly concerning intentionality and harmonic preference. It took several years for Dresher to navigate Cage’s ideas and establish his own artistic perspective.

Though his early musical path did not include opera or music theater, these would later become central to his career. Dresher credits his involvement in opera and music theater—initially through collaborations with Rinde Eckert—as a key factor in his professional success. Unlike the more limited audiences for concert music, these theatrical forms allowed him to reach broader audiences and sustain a composing career outside the confines of academia.

Dresher moved to the San Francisco Bay Area in 1973, to learn from Terry Riley at Mills College. He received his B.A. in music from the University of California, Berkeley and his M.A. in composition from the University of California, San Diego, where he studied with Robert Erickson, Roger Reynolds, Pauline Oliveros, and Bernard Rands.

He also studied Ghanaian drumming with C. K. and Kobla Ladzekpo, Hindustani classical music with Krishna Bhatt and Nikhil Banerjee, and Balinese and Javanese music.

Dresher's music has been variously described as minimalist and postminimalist. Dresher himself, poking fun at the latter term (which he perceives as fairly meaningless), has referred to himself as a "pre-maximalist," hence the name of his record label, MinMax.

Dresher served on the board of directors for the American Music Center from 1994 through 2000.

Recordings of Dresher's works are available on the Lovely Music, New World, CRI, Music and Arts, O.O. Discs, BMG/Catalyst, MinMax, Starkland, and New Albion labels.

He was the recipient of a 2006 Guggenheim fellowship.

With his Paul Dresher Ensemble, Dresher plays such newly built instruments as the Quadrachord (2000) and Hurdy Grande (2008).
