= Phillip Bimstein =

American composer

Phillip Kent Bimstein (born 1947 in Chicago, Illinois) is an American alternative classical music composer and politician.

== History ==
After majoring in music theory and composition at the Chicago Conservatory of Music, in the 1980s Bimstein led the new wave band Phil 'n' the Blanks, whose three albums and six videos were featured on college radio and MTV. After further studies at UCLA in composition, orchestration, and conducting, he moved to southern Utah.

Bimstein has served two terms as Mayor of Springdale, Utah, where he currently resides. As Mayor, he was an outspoken advocate for protection of the environment and he has testified twice before Congress in support of Utah's wilderness. Bimstein has served as chair of the Utah Humanities Council, chair of the art and humanities residency center The MESA, vice-president of the American Music Center in New York City, and is profiled in Who's Who in America. He is a frequent guest speaker on creativity, community, and collaboration. He has been described by Outside Magazine as "America's only all-natural politician-composer." In a 1997 feature article PARADE magazine called Bimstein, "The Man Who Brought Civility Back to Town."

As a composer, Bimstein has received grants and awards from the National Endowment for the Arts, Meet The Composer, American Composers Forum, and Austria’s Prix Ars Electronica. His music has been performed at Carnegie Hall, Lincoln Center, the Kennedy Center, the Bang on a Can Festival, the Aspen Music Festival, and London’s Royal Opera House.

His Garland Hirschi’s Cows CD was released by Starkland in 1996. It received favorable reviews in such publications as Stereo Review, Wired, Fanfare, and Stereophile.

In 1997 Bimstein was awarded Meet The Composer's largest grant, the three-year New Residencies, during which he composed music that explores the intimate relationship between the landscapes of the desert southwest and the many cultures that have inhabited the area.

Ensembles who have performed Bimstein's works include Relâche, Turtle Island String Quartet, Modern Mandolin Quartet, Present music, Abramyan String Quartet, Sierra Winds, Equinox Chamber Players, The California EAR Unit, and Corky Siegel's Chamber Blues.

In 2000, Bimstein received a Continental Harmony grant from the American Composers Forum, the National Endowment for the Arts, and the White House Millennium Council to write The Bushy Wushy Rag, a work celebrating baseball and the city of St. Louis. It was featured in a nationally broadcast PBS special in October 2001. Bimstein also performs and writes for the chamber folk quartet blue haiku.

The all-Bimstein CD Larkin Gifford's Harmonica was released by Starkland in 2006. In The New York Times review of the CD, Steve Smith wrote of "the irresistible charm of Mr. Bimstein's music" and "his uncanny knack for finding the music of everyday life."
