= Shelley Hirsch =

American vocalist, composer, improviser and writer (born 1952)

Shelley Hirsch (born June 9, 1952 in Brooklyn, New York) is an American vocalist, performance artist, composer, improviser, and writer. She won a DAAD Residency Grant in Berlin 1992, a Prix Futura award in 1993, and multiple awards from Creative Capital, the Foundation for Contemporary Arts, the New York State Council for the Arts, four from NYFA and six from Harvestworks Digital Media Arts Center. She was a recipient of the Guggenheim Fellowship in Music Composition .

== Life ==
Born and raised in Brooklyn, New York, Hirsch, who is of Jewish heritage, dropped out of high school and moved to San Francisco, California, where she performed with The Theater of Man under Cecile Pineda, explored extended vocal techniques, and began composing pieces for voice. In Berlin she had her first totally free improvised music concert with Sven-Åke Johansson.

Several of Hirsch's works were commissioned by New American Radio, including #39 and The Vidzer Family (1991), and O Little Town of East New York, which was originally staged at Dance Theater Workshop in New York City (1991). As a radio play, O Little Town won first prize at the Prix Futura International Media Competition in Berlin. Hirsch performed her solo composition, States, at Alice Tully Hall in 1999, recorded it for Roulette TV, and expanded it to include a chorus at the Golden Mask Festival in Moscow, Russia (2016).

Hirsch has appeared at festivals and concert halls and museums on five continents and has performed at the Kitchen, Roulette, BAM, and many other venues around and beyond New York City. She appears on the recordings of John Zorn, Elliott Sharp, Jim Staley, among 60 others, and has improvised with artists including Christian Marclay, Ikue Mori, David Weinstein and Anthony Coleman. She released the LPs Singing, mostly solo and duos with David Simons and Sam Bennett (Apollo, 1987) and the CD album Haiku Lingo (Review, 1989) with David Weinstein. She created the role of Cassandra in the opera Agamemnon (1993), performing with Robert Ashley. In 1995, O Little Town of East New York was released on compact disc as part of the "Radical Jewish Culture" series on the record label Tzadik, followed by The Far In/Far Out Worlds of Shelley Hirsch (Tzadik 2002) and Where Were You Then? with Simon Ho (Tzadik 2012). In 2008 her piece, "In the Basement," was included on the compilation album Crosstalk: American Speech Music (Bridge Records) produced by Mendi + Keith Obadike.

Other Hirsch collaborators include Fred Frith, Greetje Bijma, Chantal Dumas, David Moss, Jerry Hunt, Toshio Kajiwara, Jin Hi Kim, Marina Rosenfeld and Ned Rothenberg, as well as visual artists Barbara Bloom and Jim Hodges, choreographer Noémie Lafrance, and filmmakers Nina Danino (Temenos soundtrack with Sainkho Namtchylak, 2001), Zoe Beloff, Abigail Child, and Lee Sachs. She recorded with September Band (Rüdiger Carl, Hans Reichel and Paul Lovens) and with X-Communication (Butch Morris, Martin Schütz and Hans Koch), and she has recorded interpretations of works by other composers, such as Cathy Berberian's, Stripsody, and Alvin Curran's, Philharmonie.

In 2018, New York University Special Collections acquired her archive.

Hirsch also sang in the soundtrack to the 2025 film The Testament of Ann Lee, alongside Josephine Foster, Phil Minton, Maggie Nicols, Alan Sparhawk, and others.

== See also ==
- Vocal extended technique
