= Starkland =

- Founded: 1991
- Founder: Thomas Steenland
- Distributor: Naxos of America
- Genre: electro-acoustic, avant-garde, electronic, Experimental music, contemporary, classical
- Country of origin: United States
- Location: Boulder, Colorado
- Official website: http://www.starkland.com

Starkland is an independent record label based in Boulder, Colorado that specializes in alternative classical music. It was founded in 1991 by Thomas Steenland.

Starkland's first two CDs offered all the principal 1960s music from the "organized sound" pioneer Tod Dockstader. These releases led to major acclaim for the composer and increased recognition for his music, which stimulated Dockstader's return to composing and further releases of his music in recent years.

Most of Starkland's recordings are devoted to the music of single composers, including Charles Amirkhanian, Phillip Bimstein, Martin Bresnick, Jay Cloidt, Paul Dolden, Paul Dresher, Robert Een, Roger Kleier, Guy Klucevsek, Elliott Sharp, and Pamela Z.

Starkland's two most ambitious projects have focused on surround sound. For the label's Immersion DVD (released in 2000), Steenland commissioned 13 leading-edge composers to create pieces for high-resolution surround sound. The recording is playable at standard resolution on standard DVD players, and at high resolution on DVD-Audio players. Sources such as Pro Sound News and Billboard have recognized Immersion as the first such recording in history. The commissioned composers, all of whom created their first high-resolution surround-sound pieces, are: Paul Dolden, Paul Dresher, Ellen Fullman, Phil Kline, Lukas Ligeti, Ingram Marshall, Merzbow, Meredith Monk, Bruce Odland, Pauline Oliveros, Maggi Payne, Carl Stone, and Pamela Z. Immersion has been praised in such major publications as Stereophile and Sound & Vision, and at times has been the #1 bestselling DVD-Audio at Amazon.com.

For Starkland's other surround sound project, Steenland commissioned a major, 65-minute surround sound composition from Phil Kline. Released in 2009, Around the World in a Daze is a ten-movement work, presented in four audio formats along with 80 slides from the composer, found on the first disc of the double-DVD release. The second disc offers an extended 34-minute interview with Kline about this music (conducted by John Schaefer) and a music-video MEDITATION (run as fast as you can) with music and video by Kline. The New Yorker described the release as "A special-project disk in which Kline created, out of extravagant electronic means... an audio-visual feast that balances hipster zen with the seriousness of Bach and Wagner." The release was also praised in The New York Times, Stereophile, and New York Magazine.

Musicians on Starkland's recordings include: The Kronos Quartet, JACK Quartet, Ethel (string quartet), Turtle Island String Quartet, Either/Or, California EAR Unit, Paul Dresher Ensemble, Modern Mandolin Quartet, Todd Reynolds, Lisa Moore, Ashley Bathgate, Robert Black, Jenny Lin, and the Janáček Philharmonic Orchestra. Starkland also distributes CDs from other labels, including Paul Dresher's Slow Fire, Steven Mackey's Ravenshead and Erling Wold's A Little Girl Dreams of Taking the Veil.

John Adams, Laurie Anderson, Kyle Gann, David Lang, Meredith Monk, Bill Morrison, Eric Salzman, John Schaefer, and Elliott Sharp have written introductions for Starkland's releases.

Publications praising Starkland's releases include The New York Times, Gramophone, The Washington Post, The New Yorker, Los Angeles Times, Stereophile, Wired, Boston Globe, Sound & Vision, New York Magazine, Billboard, and England's The Wire. Starkland's recordings have been featured on such major radio programs as National Public Radio's All Things Considered and Weekend Edition.

Starkland became a nonprofit, tax-exempt organization in 2011.

== See also ==
- List of record labels
