= The Return of the Spirit (novel) =

Novel by Tawfiq Al Hakim

- Author: Tawfiq Al Hakim
- Original title: The Return of the Spirit
- Language: Egyptian Arabic (dialog) and Literary Arabic
- Genre: Novel
- Publication date: 1933
- Publication place: Egypt
- Media type: Print (hardback)

The Return of the Spirit, also known as The Soul Return, is a novel by an Egyptian writer Tawfiq Al Hakim, as he finished writing it year 1927 while he was a student in France and published it in the year 1933.

The novel was the result of a set of literary and political factors that Al Hakim was influenced by as writers of his generation in Egypt, in a period between the two wars. However, among the most important of them is 1919 revolution, which constituted a victory national idea in the political field as it gave the thinkers hope for achieving the Egyptian character.

== Plot ==
Mohsen leaves Damanhur, where his wealthy family live, as he enrols in a Cairo school. He lives a simple life with his three uncles and an aunt who takes care of them after she misses the chance of getting married. However, all the males fall in love with their neighbor Suniyah, a modern girl who plays the piano, but she disappoints them all, as she falls in love with their neighbor Mustafa. Mustafa, a well-off young man, leaves his shop, which he inherited from his father Kafr El Zayat. Next, he comes to Cairo in search of jobs for ten pounds, as Suniyah encourages him to return to his father's shop. Suniyah collides with aunt Zanouba, who dreams of marrying Mustafa and uses magic to win his heart, but she fails. The 1919 erupts for the return of Saad Zagloul and his comrades who were exiled from their homeland. Mohsen, his uncles and his servants participate in the demonstrations that support the revolution. As the novel begins of them being sick in bed in one room, it ended up in one cell in prison and in one room in a hospital.

== Translations ==
It was published in Russian in Leningrad in 1935, in French in Paris by Vaskill Publishing in 1937, and in English in Washington, D.C. in 1984.

== Adaptation ==
The novel was adapted twice:

- The Return of the Spirit (play), starring Saeed Saleh, directed by Galal Al-Sharqawi in 1963
- The Return of the Spirit (miniseries), starring Salah Zulfikar, directed by Hussein Kamal in 1977
