= The Return of the Spirit (miniseries) =

Egyptian television miniseries

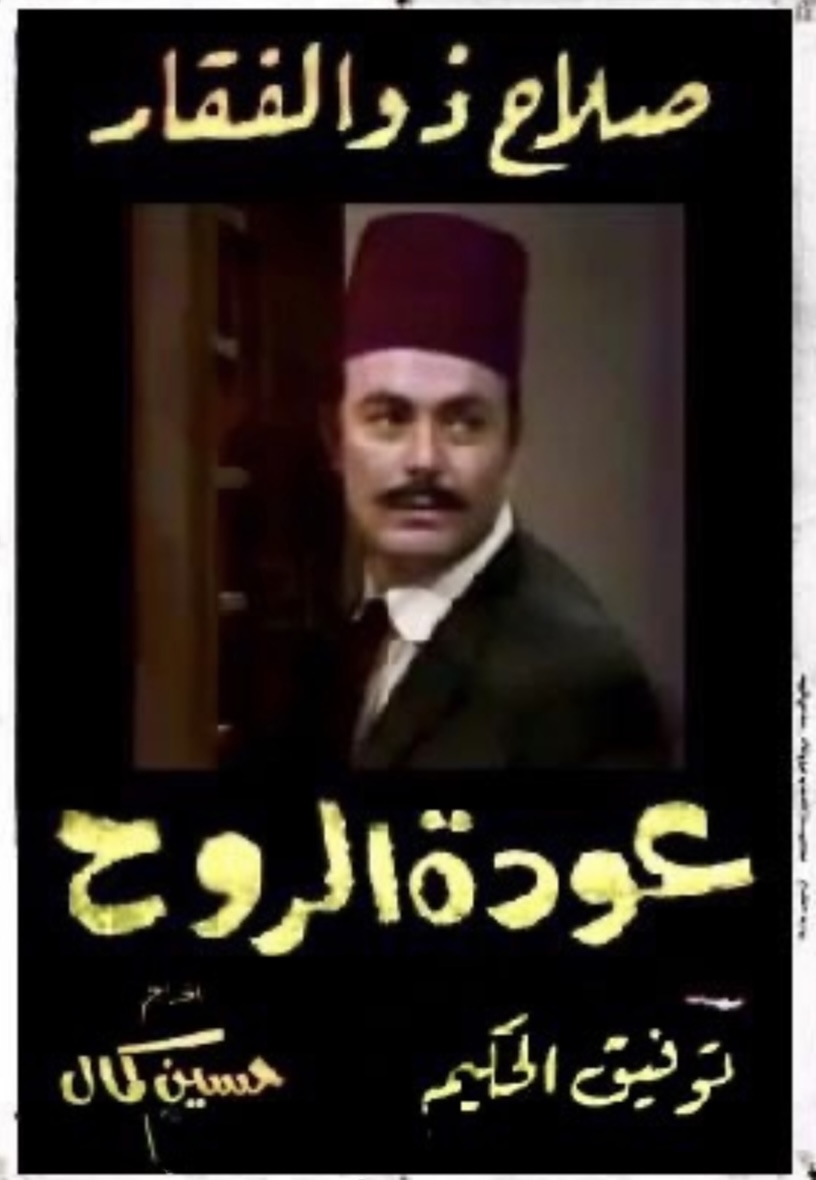
- Arabic: عودة الروح
- Genre: Drama
- Based on: The Return of the Spirit
- Written by: Tawfiq al-Hakim
- Screenplay by: Salah Tantawy
- Story by: Tawfiq al-Hakim
- Directed by: Hussein Kamal
- Starring: Salah Zulfikar
- Music by: Ammar El Sherei
- Country of origin: Egypt
- Original language: Egyptian Arabic
- No. of episodes: 26

Production
- Cinematography: Wahid Farid
- Camera setup: Multiple-camera
- Running time: 45 minutes per episode
- Production company: Egyptian Television

Original release
- Network: Egyptian Television Network
- Release: 1977 – 1977

The Return of the Spirit also known as The Soul Return (Arabic: عودة الروح, aliases: Return of the Spirit or Return of Soul or The Return of Consciousness, translit: Awdat Al-Roh, French: Retour de l'Esprit) is an Egyptian television miniseries starring Salah Zulfikar and directed by Hussein Kamal. The series is based on the 1933 novel written by Tawfiq al-Hakim under the same name.

== Plot ==
A young man who lives with his father's family of three uncles, who all fall in love with their neighbor who does not care about one of them, but she loves a neighbor in the same house, which makes one of the women do black magic to separate them, and suddenly Egyptian Revolution of 1919. The neighbors' situation changes and they decide to participate in the revolution, but they are arrested and they are all placed in one prison, then they fall ill and are taken to the hospital in one room, and each one begins to recall his memories.

== Novel adaptation ==
The novel inspired by the series, which takes place during the Egyptian Revolution of 1919, is considered one of the most important literary works in the first half of the 20th century and was presented also in the theater. Critics say that this series is the best work of art that conveys the spirit of the original literary work of the Egyptian author Tawfiq al-Hakim.

== Cast and characters ==
=== Primary cast ===
- Salah Zulfikar as Selim
- Ihsan Al-Qalawi as Zanouba
- Layla Hamada as Saneya
- Ali Al-Ghandour as Hanafi
- Ibrahim Saafan as Mabrouk
- Widad Hamdi as Bassiounieh
- Mohammed Reda as the teacher Kamel
- Wagdi Al-Arabi as Mustafa
- Issam Al-Ashri as Mohsen

=== Supporting cast ===
- Muhammad Al-Arabi as Abdo
- Younes Shalaby as Aliwa
- Malak El Gamal as Nana'a
- Abdul Rahim Al-Zarqani as Uncle Hassan
- Nazim Shaarawy as Dr. Helmy
- Sabri Abdel Aziz as Rizk
- Ibrahim Al-Shami as Hamed
- Nahed Samir as Dawlat Hanim
- Abdullah Farghali as Bustami
- Mohamed Shawky as Maimoon Gaber Maimon
- Gamalat Zayed as Umm Sahloul
- Saifullah Mukhtar as Nazaka
- Etidal Shaheen as Safinaz Hanim
- Mohammed Farhat Omar as Al-Sabilji
- Jamil Ezz El Din as Kazuli
- Ali Gohar as Mr. Black
- Medhat Ghaly as Monsieur Fox
- Ahmed Salah El-Din as Jamil Al-Hallaq
- Yahya Tawfik as the family barber

== See also ==
- Soap opera
- List of Egyptian television series
- Salah Zulfikar filmography
