= Bridge Records =

American record label

- Founded: 1981
- Founder: David Starobin
- Genre: Classical
- Country of origin: U.S.
- Location: New Rochelle, New York
- Official website: www.bridgerecords.com

Bridge Records is an independent record label that specializes in classical music located in New Rochelle, New York.

== History ==
A classical guitarist, David Starobin recorded the Boccherini Guitar Quintet in E minor in the 1970s. This was his first experience observing the process of recording. After starting Bridge Records in 1981, the first album issued was his New Music with Guitar.

Starobin's wife Becky is president of the company, while their son Robert is vice president. The catalog includes albums by Elliott Carter, George Crumb, Henri Dutilleux, Hans Werner Henze, Paul Lansky, Joaquin Rodrigo, Fred Lerdahl, Poul Ruders, Stephen Sondheim, Toru Takemitsu, and Stefan Wolpe. A series of historical recordings coordinated with the Library of Congress includes works by Samuel Barber, Budapest String Quartet, Aaron Copland, Nathan Milstein, Leontyne Price, Leopold Stokowski, George Szell, and Cecil Taylor. The label recorded Mohammed Fairouz's first opera, Sumeida's Song and operas by William Bolcom, Tod Machover, John Musto, and Allen Shawn. Bridge has received thirty nominations in the Grammy and Latin Grammy Awards.

== See also ==
- List of record labels
