= Michael Gochanour =

American director, producer and composer

Mick Gochanour
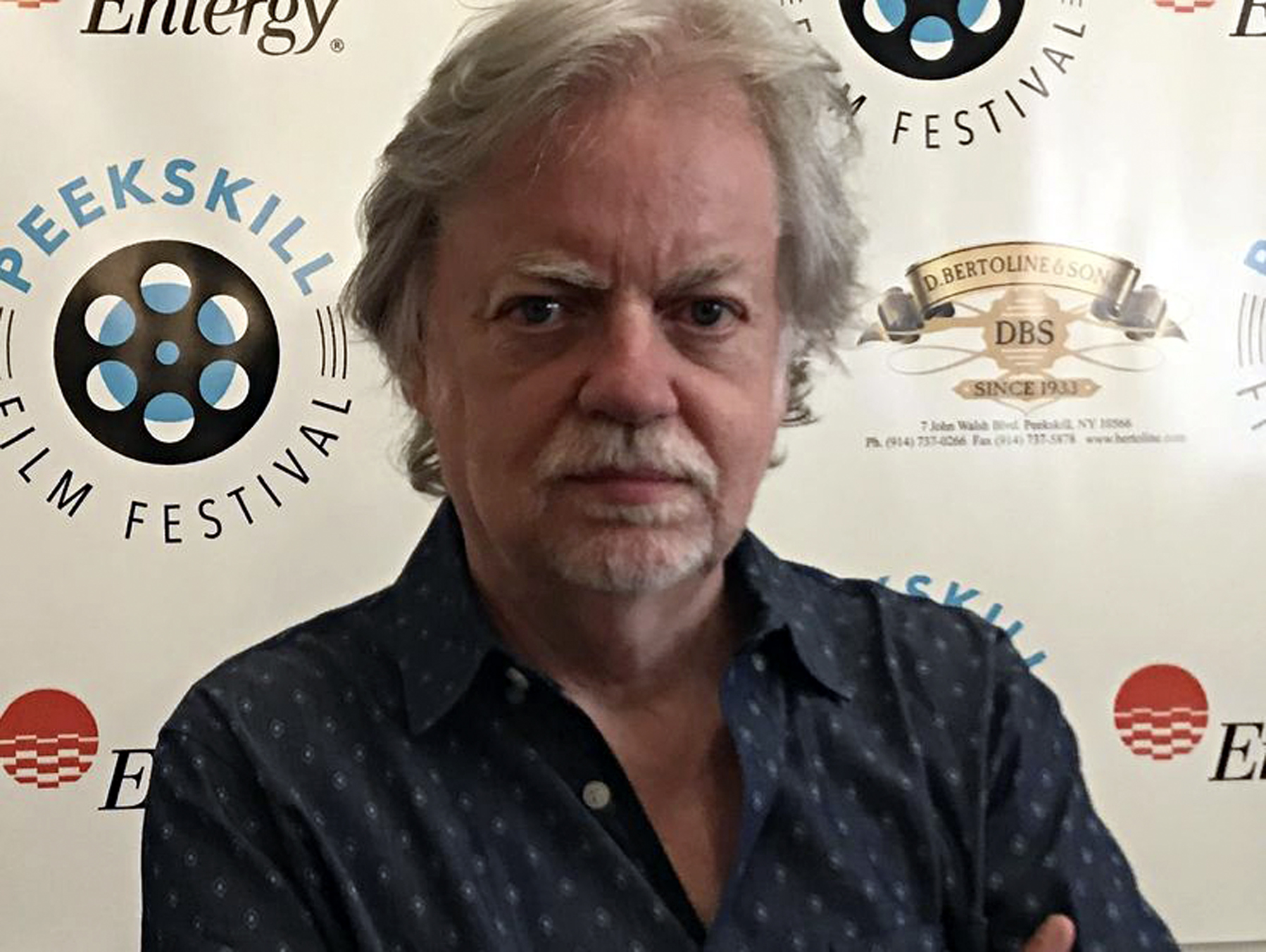
- Gochaour in 2022
- Born: Michael Gochanour; Moline, Illinois, U.S.
- Occupations: Film director; film producer; film restoration; composer
- Years active: 1975–present
- Style: Documentary; rock and roll
- Awards: Grammy Award

Michael "Mick" Gochanour is a Grammy Award-winning American film director, producer, composer, and entertainment executive. He is best known for his filmmaking and film restoration with The Rolling Stones, Alejandro Jodorowsky and Sam Cooke. As a sound designer, composer, and music supervisor, he specialized in nature videos for Turner Broadcast, World Wildlife Organization and the Discovery Channel. He has toured with such acts as Peter Gabriel and David Bowie, among others.

== Career ==
Gochanour began his production career providing assistance and tour support for Peter Gabriel (Secret World Live), David Bowie (Black Tie, White Noise), and others. His long association with ABKCO Records began in 1993 with his most notable works on films; The Rolling Stones, Alejandro Jodorowsky and Sam Cooke. Gochanour also produced or directed music videos, commercials and promotional films for The Animals, The Herman's Hermits, Metric, Virgin Air, and others.

== The Rolling Stones ==
- Rock and Roll Circus

In 1993 Gochanour was hired by ABKCO Records to produce a trailer for Jean-Luc Godard's newly restored film, Sympathy for the Devil. Allen Klein, former manager of The Rolling Stones, Sam Cooke and The Beatles, asked him to research and complete the unfinished, never released The Rolling Stones Rock and Roll Circus. In London, Gochanour and co-producer of the project Robin Klein found missing footage of the Rolling Stones in a storage vault owned by the rock group, The Who. This footage became an important part of the film and soundtrack. Rock and Roll Circus premiered at the 1996 New York Film Festival.

For the DVD release in 2004, Gochanour directed the music video for the Fatboy Slim remix of "Sympathy for the Devil".

In 2019 Gochanour and Klein restored and enhanced the film again. This time they produced the soundtrack in Dolby Atmos - which was the first Stones' project done in the new sound technology.

- Get Yer Ya Ya’s Out

In 2008 Gochanour co-produced the short documentary Get Yer Ya Ya’s Out for Albert Maysles and ABKCO Records, which featured cameos by Jimi Hendrix, Janis Joplin and The Grateful Dead.

- Charlie is My Darling - Ireland 1965

While researching archives for the upcoming 50th anniversary of The Rolling Stones, Gochanour visited the Stone's vault in London and discovered several hours of unprocessed film shot by Peter Whitehead during their 1965 promotional tour. "I almost had a heart attack when I saw it," said Gochanour, "The collaboration they used to have, which Keith talks about in his book, is right there", he told Rolling Stone. In an interview with Billboard, Gochanour said, "We did some pretty serious science on this", when talking about the painstaking restoration process, which found them working with completely un-synched, often unlabeled separate soundtracks and film. In 2012 he wrote, produced (uncredited) and directed Ireland 1965 (aka Charlie is My Darling) and also restored Whitehead's original 35-minute unreleased film. The soundtrack won a Grammy in 2014.

== Alejandro Jodorowsky ==
In 2002, Gochanour and Jodorowsky co-produced Fando y Lis, El Topo, and The Holy Mountain for ABKCO Records. Gochanour subsequently won The American Graphics award in 2013 for the design of the movie poster for Jodorowsky's The Dance of Reality, which featured the on-set photography of artist Pascal.

== Sam Cooke ==
In 2004, Gochanour won a Grammy Award for his work on Sam Cooke Portrait of a Legend 1951-1964, the first film/video biography of the artist, based on the Peter Guralnick book, Dream Boogie.

== Independent works ==
As a sound designer, composer and music supervisor, Gochanour has specialized in nature documentaries for Turner Broadcast, World Wildlife Organization and the Discovery Channel. He composed the soundtrack for T-Rex: New Science, New Beast (2007) for Emmy-winning director Ann Johnson-Prum.

He was post-producer for the documentary, Let It Fall: Los Angeles 1982 - 1992, which won the Alfred I. duPont–Columbia University Award and News & Documentary Emmy Award. As a visual artist Gochanour directed and animated a series of visual works for multi-media artist and composer Svjetlana Bukvich which included the program at the Metropolitan Museum of Art with the Ethel (string quartet) as part of Balcony Bar From Home - Ethel and Friends.

== Film & TV ==
- 2020 - A to Z of the Holy Mountain (Video short documentary) (producer)
- 2017 - Let It Fall: Los Angeles 1982-1992 (Documentary) (post producer)
- 2016 - Nature (TV Series documentary) (sound designer - 1 episode)
- 2016 - Super Hummingbirdss (sound designer)
- 2012 - The Rolling Stones: Charlie Is My Darling - Ireland 1965 (Documentary)
- 2009 - Get Yer Ya Ya's Out (Video documentary short) (producer)
- 2006 - T-Rex: New Science, New Beast (TV Movie documentary) (composer: theme music)
- 2004 - A Tale of Two Turtles (sound designer)
- 2003 - The Rolling Stones: Sympathy for the Devil (Fatboy Slim Remix) (Music Video) (producer)
- 2002 - Border (Short) (sound designer)
- 2001 - VH1 Legends (TV Series documentary) (producer - 1 episode)
- 2001 - Sam Cooke: Legend (producer)
- 2000 - Wild Life Adventures: Pollinators in Peril (TV Series) (sound designer - 1 episode)
- 1996 - The Rolling Stones Rock and Roll Circus (Documentary) (associate producer) (producer)
- 1993 - David Bowie: Black Tie White Noise (Video documentary) (midi production & playback)
- 1970 - El Topo (producer)

== Early life ==
Michael Gochanour was born in Moline, Illinois to parents Caroll and Loretta (née Lange) Gochanour. He studied film and music at Black Hawk College and played in local rock bands; he also worked in an alternative record shop in Galesburg, IL and was a founding member of The Pine Street Persuaders Blues Band before moving to New York City in 1981.
