= ...Until We Felt Red =

Studio album by Kaki King
- Released: 8 August 2006
- Label: Velour
- Producer: John McEntire

Kaki King chronology
Legs to Make Us Longer (2004)	...Until We Felt Red (2006)	Dreaming of Revenge (2008)

...Until We Felt Red is the third album by American guitarist Kaki King, released in 2006.

== Reception ==
Professional ratings
Review scores
Source	Rating
Allmusic	4/5 stars

Writing for Allmusic, critic Jeff Tamarkin noted King's change in direction on the album, commenting "...those seeking the imaginative, intricate acoustic playing that characterized King's earlier work need not, well, fret. Every track—notably "Ahuvati," "First Brain," "Second Brain," and the title track—is rich with gleaming guitaristry. What's different is that King, whose first notices came when she entertained New York subway riders, can no longer be described simply as a guitarist. From here on, she'll be watched as a complete artist.."

== Track listing ==
All tracks are written by Kaki King.

No.	Title	Length
1.	"Yellowcake"	2:51
2.	"...Until We Felt Red"	4:54
3.	"You Don't Have to Be Afraid"	8:10
4.	"Goby"	3:26
5.	"Jessica"	3:41
6.	"First Brain"	3:40
7.	"I Never Said I Love You"	4:30
8.	"Ahuvati"	3:42
9.	"These Are the Armies of the Tyrannized"	5:19
10.	"Second Brain"	3:04
11.	"Soft Shoulder"	2:52
12.	"Footsteps Die out Forever"	2:15
13.	"Gay Sons of Lesbian Mothers"	4:07
14.	"Brazilian" (iTunes bonus track)

== Personnel ==
- Kaki King – guitars, vocals and things
- John McEntire – drums and things
- Dan Brantigan – flugelhorn
- Katie Cassidy – harp
- Matt Hankle – drums
- Fred Lonberg-Holm – cello
- Dan Mintzer – drums
- Kelli Rudick – array mbira

== Production ==
- John McEntire – producer
