= DOJ =

DOJ, doj, or DoJ may refer to:

- Department of justice, also known as a ministry of justice
  - United States Department of Justice
  - Department of Justice (Canada)
  - Department of Justice (Philippines)
- Double open-jaw, a kind of open-jaw ticket used for calculating airfares

== See also ==
- Dojo (disambiguation)
