= Harry Smith (poet) =

American poet (1936–2012)

Harry J. Smith
- Born: October 15, 1936
- Died: November 23, 2012 (aged 76)
- Education: Brown University
- Occupation: Editor
- Writing career
- Genre: Poetry
- Notable work: Pushcart Prize
- Notable awards: Medwick Award
- Literary movement: Small press

Harry Joseph Smith (October 15, 1936 – November 23, 2012) was a poet, editor, and founder of the American small press movement of the later twentieth century.

== Biography ==
He was born on October 15, 1936. Educated at Brown University (class of 1957) Smith first became known in the small press world as the founder of The Smith, a literary magazine and journal of experimental writing that was in publication from 1964 to 1974. Later he established a second magazine, Pulpsmith, and a small press, The Smith-Publishers. He is recognized as a mover and a shaker in the burgeoning small press scene of the 1960s and 1970s. Typical prose can be found in The Word and Beyond: Cosmologists of the Word with Dick Higgins, Richard Morris, and Donald Phelps published in 1982 and The Sexy Sixties (2002), poetry in Trinity (1975), Sonnets to P.L.A. (1979), and Ballads for the Possessed (1987).

His magazine, The Smith and press featured among others James T. Farrell, H.L. Van Brunt, Stanley Nelson, Sidney Bernard, Seymour Krim, Tuli Kupferberg, Stephen Dwoskin, Bill Rane, Alicia Ostriker, Jana Harris, Karen Swenson, Terry Kennedy, Les Whitten and Richard (Ward) Morris. From 1968 to 1980, Smith edited The Newsletter (On the State of the Culture), which reported on both mainstream and underground publishing scenes. As editor, he was quickly cited as

a new and remarkable phenomenon. He's a literary muckraker. . . . Harry Smith has demonstrated the value of a muckraker in the cosy New York literary world.

An anthology of avant-garde poetry Inside the Outside features a selection of his poetry. Smith was a founding editor along with Anaïs Nin, Buckminster Fuller, Hugh Fox, Ishmael Reed, Joyce Carol Oates, Len Fulton, et al. of the annual Pushcart Prize for small press writing. Following the publication of his epic poem, Trinity, he was awarded PEN's 1976 Medwick Award for 'his poetry, his commitment to human values, and his achievements as an editor.'" Smith and Marion Petschek Smith were married in 1959; they had three children. After Marion's death in 1995, he was married to Clare Melley Smith. Smith died on November 23, 2012.

Ralph Farris, of the string quartet ETHEL, originally set Smith's poem Solstice People to music and it was featured in the 2007 In the House of ETHEL: Solstice concert at the World Financial Center's Winter Garden. Three of Smith's poems, including Solstice People, have now been set by Mr. Farris for SATB choir and string quartet, and have been incorporated into ETHEL's Music of the Sun program with Native American flutist Robert Mirabal.
