= Glow (Kaki King album) =

Studio album by Kaki King
- Released: October 9, 2012
- Genres: Rock, Jazz Fusion, Acoustic Music
- Label: Velour
- Producer: D. James Goodwin

Kaki King chronology
Junior (2010)	Glow (2012)	The Neck Is a Bridge to the Body (2015)

Glow, the sixth full-length album by American guitarist Kaki King, was released October 9, 2012. On Glow King returns to her instrumental roots and is accompanied by the string quartet ETHEL. “This is a guitar record,” King says to describe this album. The first single, "Great Round Burn", is available to download at RollingStone.com.

== Track listing ==
No.	Title	Length
1.	"Great Round Burn"	3:12
2.	"Streetlight in the Egg"	3:43
3.	"Bowen Island"	2:50
4.	"Cargo Cult"	3:56
5.	"Kelvinator, Kelvinator"	2:55
6.	"Fences"	3:23
7.	"No True Masterpiece Will Ever Be Complete"	3:34
8.	"Holding the Severed Self"	3:20
9.	"Skimming the Fractured Surface to a Place of Endless Light"	3:30
10.	"King Pizel"	2:49
11.	"The Fire Eater"	5:47
12.	"Marche Slav"	3:02
Total length:		41:57

== Critical reception ==
Professional ratings
Review scores
Source	Rating
Allmusic	3.5/5 stars

Writing for Allmusic, music critic Thom Jurek wrote "The sound on these pieces is crystalline, they are structured as brief, tightly constructed songs, with catchy, often ethereal melodies of varying tempo... The pristine sound is easy on the ear and easily appreciated. That said, it can sometimes detract from more organic surprises inherently written into these songs. But it's a small complaint given how much there is to enjoy here."

The album currently has a Metacritic rating of 68% based on six reviews from professional critics, indicating generally favorable reviews.

== Personnel ==
- Kaki King – guitars
- ETHEL - string quartet (strings arranged and orchestrated by Ralph Farris and ETHEL)
- Richmond Johnston - bagpipes

== Production ==
- D. James Goodwin – producer
