= Dreaming of Revenge =

Studio album by Kaki King
- Released: March 11, 2008
- Label: Velour
- Producer: Malcolm Burn

Kaki King chronology
...Until We Felt Red (2006)	Dreaming of Revenge (2008)	Mexican Teenagers EP (2009)

Dreaming of Revenge is the fourth album by the American guitarist Kaki King, released in 2008.

The album was leaked on February 22, 2008, less than a month before its official release.

On March 4, 2008, iTunes released a full version of Dreaming of Revenge featuring the bonus track "I Need a Girl Who Knows a Map".

On March 11, Amoeba Records released a version of Dreaming of Revenge that included a Vinyl 33' copy of "Pull Me Out Alive" with the unreleased B-Side "Zeitgeist".

In early April, The Japanese Edition of Dreaming of Revenge was released with Both "Zeitgeist" and "I Need a Girl Who Knows a Map" on the same disc, along with full lyrics to all songs sung on the album.

== Critical reception ==
Professional ratings
Review scores
Source	Rating
Allmusic	3.5/5 stars
The A.V. Club	(A−)
Billboard	(Favorable) link
Crawdaddy!	(Favorable) link
Detour	(Favorable)
Entertainment Weekly	(A−)
The New York Times	(Favorable)

Writing for Allmusic, music critic Thom Jurek wrote "This is not a remarkable album by any stretch, although its packaging is — it contains a punch-out mobile as a booklet — but it is a further step in the development of a singular and ever elusive artist who possesses a truckload of talent, but is still unsure of which direction to head to realize it all." Leah Greenblatt of Entertainment Weekly called it King's most "sophisticated release yet."

== Track listing ==
All tracks are written by Kaki King.

No.	Title	Length
1.	"Bone Chaos in the Castle"	2:28
2.	"Life Being What It Is"	4:00
3.	"Sad American"	3:07
4.	"Pull Me Out Alive"	3:45
5.	"Montreal"	4:27
6.	"Open Mouth"	4:41
7.	"So Much for So Little"	3:32
8.	"Saving Days in a Frozen Head"	3:08
9.	"Air and Kilometers"	4:24
10.	"Can Anyone Who Has Heard This Music Really Be a Bad Person?"	5:10
11.	"2 O'Clock"	5:50

== Personnel ==
- Kaki King – Vocals, Guitar (Electric/Acoustic), Slide Guitar, Bass, Drums, Piano
- Malcolm Burn – Keyboards, Bass, Percussion, Electric Guitar, Harmonica
- Craig Santiago – Bass Drums (Track #3)
- Dan Brantigan – Analog EVI (Track #4)
- Yuval Semo – Keyboards (Track #6)
- Elissa Cassini – First Violin (Track #6, 10)
- Funda Cizmecioglu – Second Violin (Track #6, 10)
- Youyoung Kim – Viola (Track #6, 9, 10)
- Jane O'Hara – Cello (Track #6, 9, 10)
- Dave Treut – Clarinet, Drums (Track #7, 10)
- Bora Yoon – Viola (Track #9)
- String Arrangements by Yuval Semo (Track #6) and Kyle Sanna (Tracks #9 and 10).

== Production ==
- Malcolm Burn – Producer; recorded at Le Maison Bleue Studios
- Jeff Krasno – Executive Producer
- Sean Hoess – Executive Producer
- Christen Greene – Project Coordinator
- Louis Teran – Photos
- Seb Jarnot – Design and Layout
- All songs written by Kaki King for Kaki King Music (BMI). Administered by Domino Music Publishing.
