= Native American Composers Apprenticeship Project =

Founded in 2001, the Native American Composers Apprenticeship Project (NACAP) is an outreach program of the Grand Canyon Music Festival that is dedicated to teaching Native American young people to compose concert music. Each year, young musicians work with a Native American composer and a string quartet in residence in partnership with their school's music program. For the 2011 season, the Sphinx Organization's Catalyst Quartet participated as NACAP's first Fellowship Ensemble.

In 2007 New York's WNYC aired a feature about the project on its program Soundcheck, narrated by Ralph Farris of the string quartet ETHEL.

NACAP is a winner of Arizona Governor's Arts Award for Arts in Education and in 2011 was presented with a National Arts and Humanities Youth Program Award by First Lady Michelle Obama.

== Composers-in-residence ==
- 2004–2019 - Raven Chacon (Navajo)
- 2006 - Adam Overton
- 2003 - Jerod Impichchaachaaha' Tate (Chickasaw)
- 2003 - David Mallamud
- 2001–2002 - Brent Michael Davids (Mahican)

== String Quartets-in-residence ==
- 2015 - present - Sweet Plantain Quartet: Eddie Venegas, Joe Deninzon, Edward W. Hardy (2015), Orlando Wells, and Leo Grinhauz.
- 2012 - present - Catalyst Quartet
- 2005 - 2012 - ETHEL
- 2004 - Calder Quartet
- 2003 - Avalon Quartet
- 2002 - Corigliano Quartet
- 2001 - Miró Quartet

== See also ==
- First Nations Composer Initiative
- Native American music
