= Everybody Loves You =

Studio album by Kaki King
- Released: April 22, 2003
- Genre: Instrumental rock
- Length: 38:21
- Label: Velour
- Producer: Kaki King

Kaki King chronology
Everybody Loves You (2003)	Legs to Make Us Longer (2004)

Everybody Loves You is the debut album by American guitarist Kaki King, released in 2003 (see 2003 in music).

== Reception ==
Professional ratings
Review scores
Source	Rating
Allmusic	4.5/5 stars

In his review for Allmusic, critic Thom Jurek wrote that "Simply put, Kaki King possesses the most original voice on the acoustic guitar in a generation. Her sound, full of gorgeous tapped melodies and popping basslines, is as deeply emotional as John Fahey's, as technically savvy as Preston Reed's, and as energetic as Leo Kottke's (à la 6- and 12-String Guitar, Greenhouse, and Mudlark). Citing these legendary players is not for the sake of comparison in style or approach, but in metaphor only for she sounds only like herself... Everybody Loves You is the most auspicious, tender, and tough instrumental debut by any guitarist in a decade at least. It is singular in approach and peerless in execution; and in its poetic, raggedly graceful manner, it is simply a treasure of individuality and idiosyncratic virtuosity, visceral truth, and verve."

== Track listing ==
All tracks written by Kaki King

1. "Kewpie Station" – 2:14
2. "Steamed Juicy Little Bun" – 2:01
3. "Carmine St." – 3:15
4. "Night After Sidewalk" – 3:33
5. "Happy as a Dead Pig in the Sunshine" – 3:22
6. "The Exhibition" – 3:09
7. "Close Your Eyes & You'll Burst into Flames" – 3:19
8. "Joi" – 4:36
9. "Everybody Loves You" – 3:16
10. "Fortuna" – 9:36

Bonus Tracks:

1. "The Government"
2. "L Train, 1st Ave: Low"
3. "Kewpie Station (Version 2)"
4. "Steamed Juicy Little Duck"

== Personnel ==
- Kaki King – guitar

== Production ==
- Producer – Kaki King
- Executive Producer – Jeff Patrick Krasno
- Engineers – Brian Bauers, A.J. Tissian
- Mastering – Sarah Register
