= BandQuest =

BandQuest Logo

BandQuest is a series of band music for middle-level band commissioned and published by the American Composers Forum, a national non-profit composer service organization. The series is exclusively distributed by the Hal Leonard Corporation. Contemporary composers work with school bands in composing new pieces.

== Purpose ==
The idea for BandQuest began in 2000 after a national survey of music educators conducted by the American Composers Forum revealed a need for fresh music for young bands. Many young performers lack the technical ability to play pieces by more established composers. To fill this need, American Composers Forum initially commissioned ten composers to write new works, and created accompanying CD-ROM curricula to support five of those ten works.

== History ==
BandQuest formally began in March 2002, developed by the American Composers Forum through a two-year research process, in consultation with dozens of artists and educators. Since that time the Forum has established National and Regional Advisory Committees for the project, contracted 14 composers for commissions, and retained key personnel for the positions of Music Editor and Curriculum Editor, as well as additional curriculum writers.

The early advisory board was interested in making less formulaic school band music, and encouraged composers to connect the music to other subjects proposed by students.

=== New Band Horizons vs. New Horizons Band ===
BandQuest originally began as New Band Horizons, but this title was too close to the national band group for senior performers titled New Horizons Band. Shortly before publication the title of the series was changed to BandQuest. Note that the historical documents in this entry refer to the program as New Band Horizons instead of its current name.

=== BandQuest Advanced ===
BandQuest Advanced launched in fall 2006 as a way to showcase the pieces in the series for more experienced bands. The pieces included in the subseries of BandQuest Advanced include Gunther Schuller's "Nature's Way," Robert Xavier Rodriguez' "Smash the Windows," and Judith Lang Zaimont's "City Rain.

== Pieces ==
Pieces created as a part of BandQuest include:

- Old Churches (Michael Colgrass)
- Hambone (Libby Larsen)
- Spring Festival (Chen Yi)
- A+: A "Precise" Prelude and an "Excellent" March (Tom Duffy)
- Grandmother Song (Brent Michael Davids)

== Reception ==
Instrumental Music Education describes the works as a good place to find multicultural (although not completely authentic) music arranged for middle school bands.
