= The Neck Is a Bridge to the Body =

Studio album by Kaki King
- Released: March 3, 2015
- Length: 43:44
- Producer: D. James Goodwin

Kaki King chronology
Glow (2012)	The Neck Is a Bridge to the Body (2015)	Modern Yesterdays (2020)

The Neck Is a Bridge to the Body, is the eighth full-length album by American guitarist Kaki King, released March 3, 2015. The album is the soundtrack to Kaki's projection mapping show of the same name.

== "The Neck" Live Show ==
In 2014, Kaki collaborated with the visual experience company Glowing Pictures to construct an innovative, immersive multi-media production in which the guitar is used as a projection screen to tell a story. The hour-long production, entitled The Neck is a Bridge to the Body, places the focus on the guitar itself, the Instrument serving as an ontological tabula rasa in a creation myth unlike any other ever presented.

Glowing Pictures – known for their work with such artists as Animal Collective, David Byrne & Brian Eno, Beastie Boys, and TV On The Radio – collaborated with Kaki King and have re-conceived The Guitar as a screen for a range of new digital projections. Protections of genesis and death, unexpected textures and skins, are cast onto an Ovation Adamas 1581-KK Kaki King's Signature 6-String Acoustic guitar customized specifically for the production.

“The Guitar is a shape-shifter,” King says, “something that plays all types of music and really fills all kinds of roles. It’s not always the six-string guitar that we all know and love. I’ve been playing guitar for more than 30 years. It’s who I am and if anything, this project has made me even more familiar with it.”

The Neck Is A Bridge To The Body debuted at Brooklyn’s acclaimed BRIC Theater in New York City in 2014, and toured extensively in 2015.

== Track listing ==
No.	Title	Length
1.	"In the Beginning"	4:12
2.	"Thoughts are Born"	2:31
3.	"Notes and Colours"	4:10
4.	"Ooblek"	4:15
5.	"Anthropomorph"	3:58
6.	"The Surface Changes"	3:34
7.	"Trying to Speak I (featuring ETHEL)"	3:49
8.	"Trying to Speak II (featuring ETHEL)"	4:13
9.	"It Runs and Breathes"	3:53
10.	"Battle is a Learning"	4:03
11.	"We Did Not Make The Instrument, The Instrument Made Us"	5:06
Total length:		43:44

== Personnel ==
- Kaki King – Guitars and Drums
- Dan Brantigan – Trumpet on "Anthropomorph"
- ETHEL – String Quartet on "Trying to Speak I" and "Trying to Speak II"

== Production ==
- D. James Goodwin – producer
