= Banjo guitar =

6 string banjo tuned and played like a guitar

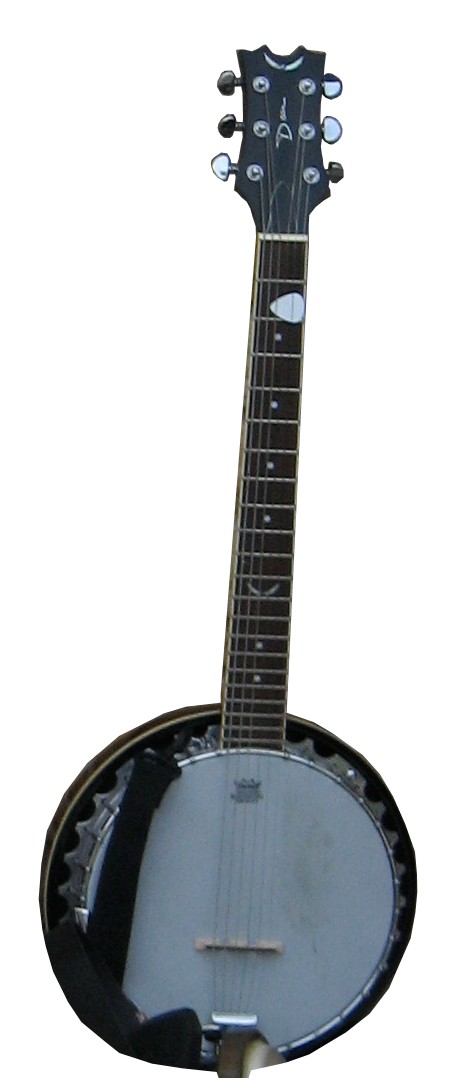
A guitar banjo or banjitar

A banjo guitar, also known as banjitar or ganjo, is a six-string banjo tuned in the standard tuning of a six-string guitar (E2-A2-D3-G3-B3-E4 from lowest to highest strings). The instrument is intended to allow guitar players to emulate a banjo, without learning the different tuning and fingering techniques required for the standard five-string banjo.

The banjo guitar differs from the standard five-string banjo in the number of strings, playing and tuning methods, and a slightly different timbre. The first versions of six-string banjos were introduced in the late 19th century though did not gain popularity. The concept was reintroduced in the mid to late 20th century.

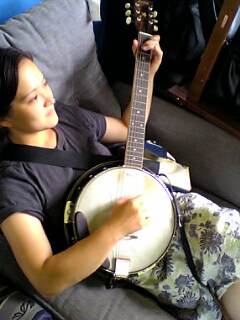
Woman playing a banjo guitar

== Banjo guitar players ==
Johnny St. Cyr was the first well known player of six string banjo. He used it in Louis Armstrong's Hot Five and Hot Seven, with Jelly Roll Morton, and in his own recordings after World War II.

A number of musicians have played banjo guitars or guitjos, and one a double-necked guitjo.

- Danny Barker
- Clint Black
- Norman Blake
- Buckethead
- Mark Butler
- Ali Campbell
- Eric Church
- David Crowder
- Clancy Hayes
- Tony Hicks
- Kevin Hayes
- Terri Hendrix
- Steve Howe
- Papa Charlie Jackson
- Steve James
- Larry LaLonde of Primus
- Taj Mahal
- Harry Manx
- Steve Martin
- Dave Matthews
- Robert May
- Sam McGee
- John McCutcheon
- Kacey Musgraves
- Harvey Reid
- Django Reinhardt
- Ed Robertson
- Janet Robin
- Ryan Ross
- Joe Satriani
- John Sebastian
- Bruce Springsteen
- Jim Stafford
- Johnny St. Cyr
- Billy Strings
- Taylor Swift
- James Taylor
- Keith Urban
- Doc Watson
- Sylvester Weaver
- Neil Young
- Chase Matthews

== See also ==
- Banjo mandolin
- Banjo ukulele
- Cümbüş
- Dojo (instrument)
