= Douglas Cox (luthier) =

American violin maker

Douglas C. Cox (born 1948) is a contemporary American violinmaker. He has been building instruments since 1981, and has made over 1000 violins, violas and cellos.

Cox received his early training at the State Violin Making School in Mittenwald, Germany. He spent ten years as head of the repair department and chief restorer for the firm of J. Bradley Taylor, Inc. in Boston before establishing his own studio in Brattleboro, Vermont in 1985.

His instruments have received awards from The Violin Society of America, and are owned and played by many professional musicians, including classical players Jaime Laredo, Daniel Panner, James Buswell, the late Eric Rosenblith, the late Marylou Speaker Churchill of the Boston Symphony, and the late Robert Koff of the Juilliard Quartet; jazz and contemporary players such as Todd Reynolds, Ralph Farris, Mat Maneri, Eugene Friesen; baroque players such as Laura Jeppeson and Daniel Stepner of Boston Baroque, and by such institutions as Indiana University, Oberlin Conservatory, Ravinia Festival's Steans Institute, the United States Marine Band, University of North Texas, the National Music Museum, and Lawrence University

Many of his instruments are close copies of unusual and noteworthy master instruments. Techniques he uses to analyze the acoustic properties of violins include audio spectrum analysis, density testing, and materials modification.

His publications include: “The Baroque Violin” and “Copying the Harrison Stradivari.”
