= Modern Yesterdays =

Studio album by Kaki King
- Released: October 23, 2020
- Recorded: March 2020
- Studio: New York City, New York, United States
- Genre: Experimental rock
- Length: 46:06
- Language: Instrumental
- Label: Cantaloupe Music
- Producer: Kaki King

Kaki King chronology
Live in Berklee (2017)	Modern Yesterdays (2020)

Modern Yesterdays is a 2020 studio album by American rock guitarist Kaki King, release on Cantaloupe Music.

== Recording and release ==
King built the album around a live performance piece Data Not Found that would be toured as a stage show, but these plans were canceled due to the COVID-19 pandemic. Recording the album in March 2020, everyone in the studio got the disease, leaving the guitarist struggling to recover her dexterity as a musician almost a year later. Preparation for the recording and stage show included King making custom-designed guitars with a luthier and using obscure technology such as the Vo96, which changes string vibrations on her guitar to achieve unique sounds. To finalize the recordings, King put guitar and percussion parts to tape, leaving the rest of the songs to be created by sound designer Chloe Alexandra with King coming in at the final mix to approve the recordings.

== Reception ==
Editors at AllMusic Guide scored this release 4.5 out of five stars, declaring it among the Best of 2020, with critic Thom Jurek spotlighting several tracks where King's experimentation shines, with descriptions such as "her deft, muscular fingerpicking rings across the middle- and lower-register strings amid a labyrinth of refracted sounds -- bubbles, wordless synthed vocal choruses, percussive reverb, etc. -- as she moves through intricate, driving, polytonal melodies articulated in several musical languages simultaneously".

== Track listing ==
All songs written by Kaki King

1. "Default Shell" – 3:32
2. "Can't Touch This or That or You or My Face" – 4:08
3. "Teek" – 4:31
4. "Godchild" – 4:54
5. "Rhythmic Tiny Sand Ball Patterns" – 4:21
6. "Puzzle Me-You" – 4:25
7. "Final State" – 4:32
8. "Lorlir" – 2:49
9. "Sanitized, Alone" – 4:19
10. "Sei sei" – 3:53
11. "Forms of Light and Death" – 4:42

== Personnel ==
- Kaki King – guitar, production
- Chloe Alexandra – sound design, co-production
- John Brown – art direction, graphic design
- Ralph Farris – viola on "Teek"
- Michael Gordon – executive production
- Úlfur Hansson – arrangement on "Forms of Light and Death"
- Jessica Templin King – artwork
- David Lang – executive production
- Arjan Miranda – engineering, co-production
- Sarah Register – mastering
- Kenny Savelson – executive production
- Julia Wolfe – executive production
- Ebru Yildiz – photography

== See also ==
- List of 2020 albums
