= Ralph Farris =

American conductor

Ralph Farris (born Ralph Howard Farris, Jr., 1970) is an American violist, violinist, composer, arranger, producer and conductor, best known as a founding member and artistic director of the ensemble ETHEL. Farris is an electric string player with a lengthy career that spans the gamut of musical genres from rock and jazz to Broadway. His instruments are outfitted with a piezoelectric pickup which allows him to play amplified. Amplification was initially adopted early in Farris's career in order to facilitate the playing of various "contemporary classical" pieces that involve electronic components. It continues to be integral to his signature sound.

== Early life ==
Farris was born in Boston, Massachusetts in 1970, the son of musicians, Nancy DuCette Farris and Ralph Howard Farris. He began studying music at the age of 3, beginning with recorder and piano, moving on to violin at age six. As a boy soprano, he was featured as a soloist in several of his parents' Ralph Farris Chorale productions, including Leonard Bernstein's Chichester Psalms, Pie Jesu from Gabriel Fauré's Requiem, and in the title role of Gian Carlo Menotti's Amahl and the Night Visitors. From 1976 to 1982 Farris attended the Longy School of Music and was a member of the New England Conservatory of Music's Youth Philharmonic Orchestra under Benjamin Zander from 1982 to 1989. In 1983 Farris entered Walnut Hill School for the Arts, where he graduated in 1989. Between 1989 and 1991 Farris was a three-year recipient of a Tanglewood Fellowship, where he won both most outstanding violist and most outstanding participant. He participated in the Spoleto Festival USA/Festival dei Due Mondi in 1992. In 1995 he attended Dartington International Summer School, in the conducting program under the tutelage of maestro Diego Masson. Farris holds B.M. and M.M. degrees (accelerated program) from The Juilliard School, where he studied with Samuel Rhodes, graduating in 1994. He was awarded the school's William Schuman Prize in 1994.

== Career ==
From his earliest concerts, Farris was a notable soloist. As the principal violist of The Juilliard Orchestra, Farris performed at Carnegie Hall in Roger Daltrey's 1994 A Celebration: The Music of Pete Townshend and The Who, playing the famous fiddle solo in Baba O'Riley. After, he became the musical director for the short-lived tour of the same name. Farris is an original member of the orchestra Broadway production of The Lion King, where he doubled on violin and viola and served for a few years as an assistant conductor. He is on The Lion King: Original Broadway Cast Recording (1997). Farris has recorded with and arranged for a wide variety of well known jazz, classical, rock and country musicians. He has worked as music supervisor, acting coach, and contractor for luminaries in film, theater, dance and music.

During the 9/11 Relief Effort Farris was the lead coordinator of the volunteer musicians who performed daily at New York City's St. Paul's Chapel ("The Miracle Church"). In December 2001, he conducted a group of Broadway actors and singers in a radio simulcast of holiday songs at Ground Zero and Times Square. His string quartet arrangement of The Star-Spangled Banner was performed at the World Trade Center site by the St. Paul's Chapel String Quartet on the one-year anniversary of the September 11, 2001, attacks and was internationally televised. The WNYC program Soundcheck featured Farris as one of four guests for a project called Measuring Time: Music for 9/11/11 marking the tenth anniversary of 9/11.

Farris is a very active participant in arts education. On his own and through ETHEL's Foundation for the Arts he has taught master classes at numerous universities and music conservatories. His quartet is the ensemble in residence at Denison University. In 2007 he recorded a segment for New York's WNYC about his experience working with young composers in the Native American Composers Apprenticeship Project (NACAP), a National Arts and Humanities Youth Program Award winning outreach program in which ETHEL has been an artist-in-residence since 2005. In 2010 and 2011, he was a guest composer with the Eastport Strings, a youth ensemble in Eastport, Maine, hometown to Farris's grandfather. He is a frequent lecturer at Juilliard and currently serves as a member of the board of trustees of his alma mater Walnut Hill.

== Musical style ==
WNYC's John Schaefer has described Farris as an "arranger extraordinaire". He is credited for wide variety of pop and rock orchestrations and arrangements, such as the strings for Five for Fighting's chart topping ballad "Superman (It's Not Easy)" and the single "Great Round Burn" on KaKi King's album Glow. The ensemble ETHEL is typically described as being part of New York City's Downtown Music scene because of their close association with composers from the Bang on a Can collective and with the experimental art spaces The Kitchen and Tonic where they got their start. Farris has a fairly omnivorous musical style, which is sometimes labeled Totalism or Polystylism for its rock and pop influences. His compositions include Three Solstice Songs based on works by the late poet Harry Smith, for string quartet and SATB choir. The first of these, Solstice People, was featured in the 2007 In the House of ETHEL: Solstice concert at the World Financial Center's Winter Garden. Factions, for string quartet was premiered at BAM's 2013 Next Wave Festival with accompanying video projection. In 2014 he composed incidental music for the Aquila Theatre's A Female Philoctetes which premiered at the BAM's Fisher's Hillman Studio and served as musical director and composer for their touring production of The Tempest. Sammich, for string quartet and 2 guitars, was featured in the 2015 Ecstatic Music Festival.

With his string quartet, Farris tours extensively, more than 150 days a year. In 2014 he made some solo and collaborative appearances, including the Tribeca New Music Festival with Tracy Silverman, MIT's Hacking Arts Festival with Karen Krolak from the dance corp Monkeyhouse, and Vassar College's Modfest, with percussionist Frank Cassara.

Farris lives in New York City and plays a 1994 Gasparo da Salò 17¼" viola made by Douglas Cox.
