= Legs to Make Us Longer =

Studio album by Kaki King
- Released: October 5, 2004
- Genre: Instrumental rock
- Length: 47:40
- Label: Red Ink
- Producer: David Torn

Kaki King chronology
Everybody Loves You (2003)	Legs to Make Us Longer (2004)	...Until We Felt Red (2006)

Legs to Make Us Longer is the second album by American guitarist Kaki King, released in 2004.

The songs "Frame" and "Doing the Wrong Thing" were featured in the film Into the Wild (2007).

== Reception ==
Professional ratings
Review scores
Source	Rating
Allmusic	3.5/5 stars

In his review for Allmusic, critic Thom Jurek summarized that "King is a major talent, an iconoclastic figure who is this era's only new voice on the acoustic guitar, even as she explores other compelling sonic and musical avenues."

== Track listing ==
All tracks written by Kaki King

1. "Frame" – 2:04
2. "Playing With Pink Noise" – 3:02
3. "Ingots" – 3:53
4. "Doing the Wrong Thing" – 5:04
5. "Solipsist" – 2:30
6. "Neanderthal" – 4:28
7. "Can the Gwot Save Us?" – 4:20
8. "Lies" – 4:55
9. "All the Landslides Birds Have Seen Since the Beginning of the World" – 2:42
10. "Magazine" – 4:08
11. "My Insect Life" – 10:34

== Personnel ==
- Kaki King – guitar
- Will Calhoun – drums
- Hector Castillo – bass drums
- Erik Friedlander – cello
- Joyce Hammann – violin, viola
- Conrad Korsch – upright bass
- Ben Perowsky – drums
- David Torn – bass, piano, drums
- T. Xiques – cymbals

== Production ==
- Producer – David Torn
- Executive Producer – Jeff Patrick Krasno
- Engineer – Hector Castillo
- Assistant Engineers – Nishiki Ichiho, James Reagan
- Mixing – Hector Castillo, David Torn
- Mixing Assistants – Nishiki Ichiho, James Reagan
- Mastering – Greg Calbi
- A&R – Kaz Utsunomiya
- Assistants – Chris Powers, Sean Price
- Product Manager – Scott Greeg
- Arranger – David Torn
- Art direction – Brian Ponto
- Photography – Ian Allen
