= American Composers Forum =

US non-profit organization

The American Composers Forum is an American organization that promotes and assists American composers and contemporary classical music. It was founded in 1973 as the Minnesota Composers Forum and is based in Saint Paul, Minnesota, with activities taking place in Minnesota, New York City, and elsewhere. As of 2000 it was the largest composer-service organization in the country. The organization is led by Executive Director Loki Karuna (formerly Garrett McQueen).

== History ==
The Forum was founded as the Minnesota Composers Forum in 1973 by a group of University of Minnesota graduate students—including Libby Larsen, Stephen Paulus, and Marjorie Rusche—with a $400 grant from the University’s Student Club Activities Fund. In 1996, it changed its name to the American Composers Forum, and established chapters in New York City, Boston, Massachusetts, Philadelphia, Washington, D.C., Atlanta, Chicago, San Francisco, and Los Angeles, California. The group acts as a national umbrella organization for locally funded chapters in Minnesota (based in Saint Paul), Philadelphia, and the San Francisco Bay Area, in addition to volunteer-led chapters in New York City and Los Angeles. In 2007, the group, along with the American Music Center, extended membership to composition students at six affiliated academic institutions: Indiana University's Jacobs School of Music, the New England Conservatory, the San Francisco Conservatory, the University of Michigan in Ann Arbor, and Yale University. The Forum's annual budget for fiscal year 2019 was $1.6 million.

Forum members pay annual dues that are used to fund networking and informational services, such as the Forum's website and bimonthly newsletter, Sounding Board. The Forum also funds national and local commissioning projects, as well as offers programs for individual composers and performers of new music. These projects and programs are funded by grants from government agencies, corporate and private foundations, and individual contributions.

Current Forum programs include Continental Harmony, a national, community-based commissioning program; Faith Partners, a residency program that pairs multiple communities of faith with a composer of their choice; BandQuest, a program that supports the creation of new work for middle-level concert bands by contemporary composers such as Michael Colgrass, Michael Daugherty, Jennifer Higdon, Tania Léon, and Gunther Schuller; Composers Datebook, a daily two-minute radio program about contemporary composers in the context of classical music history; and Innova Recordings, a record label that issues more than two dozen releases of new music each year. In cooperation with the American Music Center and the Minnesota Orchestra, the Forum also offers the annual Minnesota Orchestra Composer Institute, a week-long series of professional workshops and career seminars for new composers, culminating in a public concert of their works performed by the Minnesota Orchestra and its music director at Orchestra Hall in Minneapolis.

== First Nations Composer Initiative ==
In 2006 the Forum launched, with the Ford Foundation, the First Nations Composer Initiative (FNCI), an organization working to promote new music by Native American composers. Based in Saint Paul, the program aims to establish a national infrastructure for American Indian composers and performers, and promote the artists in both Native and non-Native communities.

Its program director is Georgia Wettlin-Larsen, and its advisors include Louis W. Ballard (deceased), Sharon Burch, Raven Chacon, Brent Michael Davids, Joy Harjo, Jennifer E. Kreisberg, R. Carlos Nakai, Joanne Shenandoah, Dawn Avery, and Jerod Impichchaachaaha' Tate.

The organization sponsors the Composer Apprentice National Outreach Endeavor (CANOE), which teaches American Indian young people to compose their own concert music. It also supported the North American Indian Cello Project commissioning and supporting performances of composers including Brent Michael Davids, Raven Chacon, Tim Archambault, Ron Warren, R. Carlos Nakai, Dawn Avery, Louis W. Ballard, and Tio Becenti.

== See also ==
- American Composers Alliance
- American Composers Orchestra
- Native American Composers Apprenticeship Project
- Native American music
