= Georgia Wettlin-Larsen =

Nakota singer

Georgia Wettlin Larsen was a Nakota singer who released several discs featuring Native American songs. Perhaps her most famous performance was when her song "Ojibway Square Dance" was featured during the fourth-season episode "Learning Curve" of Northern Exposure, originally aired on February 8, 1993.

She served as Program Director for the First Nations Composer Initiative in St. Paul, Minnesota.

== Discography ==
- Heartbeat: Voices of First Nations Women
  - Lakota Flute Song
  - Ojibwa Love Charm Song
  - Ojibwa Love Song
- Wood That Sings: Indian Fiddle Music of the Americas
  - Turkey in the Straw
