= Black Pear Tree =

EP by the Mountain Goats & Kaki King
- Released: October 13, 2008
- Studio: Baucom Road Studios in Monroe, North Carolina
- Length: 19:15
- Label: Cadmean Dawn
- Producer: Scott Solter

Black Pear Tree is an EP by The Mountain Goats and Kaki King, released in 2008 as a vinyl only and tour only EP. Track 6's title is a reference to Super Mario Bros.

== Track listing ==
1. "Black Pear Tree" – 3:46
2. "Mosquito Repellent" – 2:49
3. "Bring Our Curses Home" – 3:20
4. "Supergenesis" – 3:16
5. "Roger Patterson Van" – 2:48
6. "Thank You Mario but Our Princess Is in Another Castle" – 3:19

== Personnel ==
- Kaki King – vocals, drums, lap steel, guitar
- John Darnielle – vocals, piano, organ, bells, guitar
