= Ethel (string quartet) =

Musical group from New York, US

- Origin: New York, New York, U.S.
- Genres: Contemporary classical
- Occupation: Chamber ensemble
- Years active: 1998–present
- Labels: Cantaloupe Music; Innova Recordings
- Members: Ralph Farris, viola Kip Jones, violin Dorothy Lawson, cello Corin Lee, violin
- Past members: Jennifer Choi (2011–2012), violin Cornelius Dufallo (2005–2012), violin Todd Reynolds (original member, 1998–2005), violin Mary Rowell (original member, 1998–2011), violin Tema Watstein (2012–2014), violin
- Website: ethelcentral.org

Ethel is a New York based string quartet that was co-founded in 1998 by Ralph Farris, viola; Dorothy Lawson, cello; Todd Reynolds, violin; and Mary Rowell, violin. Unlike most string quartets, Ethel plays with amplification and integrates improvisation into its performances. The group's current membership includes violinists Kip Jones and Corin Lee.

According to The New York Times, "The quartet called itself Hazardous Materials for its earliest concerts, a name soon dropped for its negative connotations. As the players considered other names, Ms. Rowell remembered a scene from the movie Shakespeare in Love: Shakespeare racked with writer's block as he tried to complete a play called Romeo and Ethel, the Pirate's Daughter. Ms. Rowell suggested Ethel as a name. Improbably, it stuck."

Ethel performs original music as well as works by notable contemporary composers such as Julia Wolfe, John Zorn, Don Byron, Marcelo Zarvos, Pamela Z, Phil Kline, John King and many more. The group's 2004–2005 season culminated with a 45-city U.S. and European tour with the rock musicians Joe Jackson and Todd Rundgren, which included an appearance on Late Night with Conan O'Brien. Their 2005–2006 season included the Cantaloupe Music release of its second CD, Light, performances at BAM Next Wave Festival with choreographer Wally Cardona in New York, first-time performances in Miami (Florida), the Krannert Center for the Performing Arts in Champaign-Urbana, Illinois, performance at the new Experimental Media and Performing Arts Center at the Rensselaer Polytechnic Institute in Troy, New York as well as at the TED (Technology, Entertainment, Design) Conference, and a monthly residency at Joe's Pub. In 2008 Ethel worked with director Annie Dorsen to produce Ethel's TruckStop: The Beginning which was performed at BAM's Next Wave Festival. Months later, they offered another large scale performance, Wait for Green, presented by World Financial Center in the Winter Garden with choreographer Annie-B Parson. Ethel returned to the TED Conference in 2010 as the house band, performing with Thomas Dolby, David Byrne and Andrew Bird. They performed at Lincoln Center Out of Doors in the summer of 2010, collaborating with Juana Molina, Dayna Kurtz, Tom Verlaine, Patrick A. Derivaz, Mike Viola and Adam Schlesinger. In 2011, Ethel was an artist in residence at the Park Avenue Armory.

Members of the group performed or recorded with Bang on a Can, The Chamber Music Society of Lincoln Center, the Orpheus Chamber Orchestra, the New York Chamber Symphony, CONTINUUM, Sheryl Crow, Roger Daltrey, and Yo-Yo Ma's Silk Road Project.

In 2002 the string quartet founded Ethel's Foundation for the Arts, a nonprofit organization with a mission to support contemporary concert music with collaborative projects, commission of new works, and educational outreach. In keeping with this mission, Ethel has been the string quartet in residence since 2005 with the Native American Composers Apprenticeship Project (NACAP), an affiliate program of the Grand Canyon Music Festival, which is dedicated to teaching Native American young people to compose concert music. In 2011 NACAP was presented with a National Arts and Humanities Youth Program Award by First Lady Michelle Obama.

Ethel toured a program titled Tell Me Something Good with special guest Todd Rundgren in 2012. The program included Lou Harrison's Quartet Set, Herbie Hancock's Watermelon Man, a new commission, Octet 1979, by Judd Greenstein, Sunrise of the Planetary Dream Collector by Terry Riley, Spiegel im Spiegel by Arvo Pärt and Led Zeppelin's Kashmir, as well as an entire set of Todd Rundgren songs performed with Rundgren himself. Ethel is the current resident ensemble at the Metropolitan Museum's Balcony Bar Also this season, Ethel will present a multimedia program, Ethel's Documerica, celebrating the 40th anniversary of the Environmental Protection Agency's Documerica, launched in 1972. The program will feature new commissions from American composers; Jerod Impichchaachaaha' Tate, Ulysses Owens Jr., James "Kimo" Williams, and Mary Ellen Childs, and will include a visual component designed by visual artist Deborah Johnson. Ethel's Documerica will premier at the Park Avenue Armory as part of its Under Construction series. For a second consecutive year, the Jerome Foundation has announced support of Ethel's Foundation for the Arts HomeBaked program to commission new works from emerging New York City-based composers. Ethel has announced that this season's composers will be Hannis Brown, Lainie Fefferman, Dan Friel and Ulysses Owens, Jr., with works premiering in Spring 2013. In 2014 Denison University announced that Ethel will become their first ensemble in residence. In July 2016, Denison University announced that all four quartet members (Farris, Jones, Lawson and Lee) will receive honorary degrees, Doctor of Humane Letters, honoris causa. The degrees were awarded during the college’s 176th Commencement exercises on Saturday, May 13, 2017.

== Discography ==
=== Recordings: Self Produced ===
- 2003 – Ethel, with music by John King, Phil Kline, Todd Reynolds and Evan Ziporyn, Cantaloupe Music
- 2006 – Light, with music by Timo Alakotila, Don Byron, Mary Ellen Childs, Einstein the African grey parrot, Lennie Tristano, Pamela Z and Marcelo Zarvos, Cantaloupe Music
- 2012 – Heavy, with music by Don Byron, John Halle, Julia Wolfe, John King, Raz Mesinai, David Lang, Kenji Bunch and Marcelo Zarvos, Innova Recordings
- 2015 – Documerica, with music by Mary Ellen Childs, Ralph Farris, Kip Jones, Dorothy Lawson, Ulysses Owens Jr., Jerod Impichchaachaaha Tate, Tema Watstein and James Kimo Williams, Innova Recordings
- 2024 – Persist, Sono Luminus

=== Recordings: Featured Artist ===
- 2000 – Downtown Documents: Hazardous Materials, VHS, live concert, Context Studios
- 2001 – Mel Graves: Day of Love, Mutable Music
- 2001 – Muhal Richard Abrams: The Visibility of Thought, Mutable Music
- 2003 – Julia Wolfe: The String Quartets, Cantaloupe Music
- 2004 – Lukas Ligeti: Mystery System, Tzadik
- 2005 – Neil Rolnick: Shadow Quartet, Innova Records
- 2005 – Here This Now: Cantaloupe Music Sampler on "Sweet Hardwood" by John King
- 2006 – TED 2006: The Future We Will Create, DVD/CD, TED
- 2006 – John King: AllSteel, Tzadik
- 2006 – Mary Ellen Childs: Dream House, Innova Recordings
- 2007 – A Sampler From Cantaloupe Music on "Also Sprach Einstein" by Mary Rowell
- 2007 – For New Orleans, Benefit compilation CD including artists Jeff Buckley, Indigo Girls, Natalie Merchant, Marshall Crenshaw, Dan Wilson, the Jayhawks and more, Sugarfoot Music
- 2008 – Douglas J. Cuomo: Arjuna's Dilemma, Innova Recordings
- 2008 – Joshua Rosenblum: Sundry Notes on "Will You Please Be Serious?", Albany Records
- 2009 – Phil Kline: Around the World in a Daze on "Svarga Yatra", Starkland
- 2009 – Phil Kline: John the Revelator, with the vocal ensemble Lionheart, Cantaloupe Music
- 2010 – Oshtali: Music for String Quartet by Chickasaw String Composers
- 2010 – NYFA Collection: 25 Years of New York Music, Innova Recordings
- 2011 – Neil Rolnick: Extended Family, Innova Recordings
- 2012 – Anna Clyne: Blue Moth on "Roulette", Tzadik
- 2012 – Cold Blue Two, various artists, on "Sky with Four Suns" by John Luther Adams, Cold Blue Music
- 2014 – Jerome Kitzke, The Paha Sapa Give-Back on "Winter Count", Innova
- 2014 – Hafez Modirzadeh, In Convergence Liberation, Pi Recordings
- 2021 – Joe Jackson, Todd Rundgren, State Theater New Jersey 2005, Purple Pyramid

=== Recordings: Guest Artist ===
- 2000 – Joe Jackson: Night and Day II, Sony
- 2002 – Dayna Kurtz: Postcards From Downtown, Kismet/Mri
- 2004 – Dayna Kurtz: Beautiful Yesterday, Kismet/Mri
- 2007 – Soundtrack Dan in Real Life, Capitol Records
- 2007 – Mudville: Iris Nova, Slurry Records
- 2007 – Eric Starr Group: She
- 2008 – Room Eleven: Mmm... Gumbo?, Universal Music Group
- 2009 – Kurt Elling: Dedicated to You: Kurt Elling Sings the Music of Coltrane and Hartman, Concord Records, 2010, live concert recording Grammy Award for Best Jazz Vocal Album
- 2011 – Thomas Dolby: A Map of the Floating City, on "Love Is A Loaded Pistol"
- 2012 – Joe Jackson: The Duke, Razor & Tie
- 2012 – Kaki King: Glow, Velour Recordings, on "Great Round Burn" and "The Fire Eater"
- 2015 – Kaki King: The Neck Is a Bridge to the Body, Short Stuff Records, on "Trying to Speak I" and "Trying to Speak II"
- 2020 - Svjetlana Bukvich, EXTENSION, "Once You Are Not A Stranger", Navona Records

=== Recordings: Film and Television ===
- 2000 – Steve Oscar Moore: The Indescribable Nth, animated film with score by Bennie Wallace, Character Builders
- 2004 – Deadwood Pilot Episode, on track "Shuffle" by composer John King, HBO
- 2007 – Susan Todd: The Mother Is the One Who Stretches, score by Ethel, Archipelago Films
- 2008 – John Turner: Soundtrack You Belong to Me, CD Baby
- 2008 – Jehane Noujaim: Pangea Day Trailer, score by Ethel, TED
- 2009 – Christopher North: Soundtrack Everything's Jake, Chris Fetchko Films
- 2009 – Stewart Wallace: Soundtrack Daylight
- 2009 – Ela Orleans: Zodiac, scary cue, BMI
- 2010 – Danièle Wilmouth: Eleanor & the Timekeeper, score by Ethel, Hairless Films
- 2010 – Christopher North: Soundtrack Eavesdrop, CD Baby/INDYS
- 2010 – Lee Brooks: 2010 Oslo Freedom Forum Soundtrack, Lee Brooks Media
- 2010 – Jim Rivett: Westbound, Various Artists, on track "Hobo Soup" with Jill Sobule
- 2011 – Molly McBride: Strings on the Rez, PBS
- 2012 – Tom Schroeder: Marcel, King of Tevuren, animated film with score from "The Blue Room and Other Stories" by composer Phil Kline
