= Mexican Teenagers EP =

Mexican Teenagers

EP by Kaki King
- Released: March 30, 2009
- Genre: Instrumental rock
- Length: 16'45"
- Label: Cooking Vinyl

Kaki King chronology
Dreaming of Revenge (2008)	Mexican Teenagers (2009)	Junior (2010)

Mexican Teenagers is an EP by American guitarist Kaki King released in 2009.

== Track listing ==
No.	Title	Length
1.	"Mexican Teenagers"	3:49
2.	"Gouge Both Your Eyes Out (But Eat Only One)"	2:15
3.	"Lintoria"	3:05
4.	"Vivian Leigh's Veins"	3:01
5.	"A Long Way To Go Before We Are Truly Danlike"	4:35

== Personnel ==
- Kaki King: guitar
- Matt Hankle: drums
- Dan Brantigan: Electronic EVI Synth
