= Charlie Is My Darling (film) =

Documentary film about the Rolling Stones

Charlie Is My Darling – Ireland 1965
- Poster for the 2012 restored version
- Directed by: Peter Whitehead (1966) and Michael Gochanour (2012)
- Produced by: Andrew Loog Oldham (1966); Robin Klein (2012)
- Starring: The Rolling Stones
- Cinematography: Peter Whitehead
- Edited by: Peter Whitehead (1966); Nathan Punwar (2012)
- Distributed by: ABKCO Films/Brainstorm Media
- Release dates: October 1966 (IFFMH); 29 September 2012 (NYFF)
- Running time: 35 minutes (1966); 64 minutes (2012)
- Countries: UK (1966 version); USA (2012 version)
- Language: English

Charlie Is My Darling, directed by Peter Whitehead and produced by the Rolling Stones' manager Andrew Loog Oldham, was the first documentary film about the Rolling Stones. Intended as a screen test for the band, to see how their musical charisma would translate into film, the footage was shot during the band's second tour of Ireland on 3 and 4 September 1965, and was finished in the spring of 1966. It was given its premiere at the Mannheim Film Festival in October 1966. But the film was never officially released, due to the legal fights between the Rolling Stones and Allen Klein and a burglary in Oldham's office, which saw all prints disappear.

Nearly fifty years later, in 2012, a new film using restored footage and entitled Charlie Is My Darling – Ireland 1965 was released by Allen Klein's ABKCO Records, which owns the rights to all older Stones material. Charlie Is My Darling – Ireland 1965 came about when director Michael Gochanour discovered additional unprocessed footage of the 1965 Rolling Stones screen test. Gochanour spent two years editing and remixing the '60s material, adding a story line and synching music to Rolling Stones concert footage that had originally been filmed without sound. The result was Charlie Is My Darling – 1965. One of Gochanour's objectives in making the film was "to show The Rolling Stones in a way the world had never seen them before; as a band just coming into their own – raw, visceral, innocent and with purpose."

The 64-minute documentary, Charlie Is My Darling – Ireland 1965, follows the Stones (Mick Jagger, Keith Richards, Brian Jones, Bill Wyman, and Charlie Watts) from their car trip out of London to Heathrow Airport, and from there to Dublin where they had two concerts at the Adelphi Theatre on 3 September. The next day they take a train up to Belfast for two concerts at the ABC Theatre, before returning to London by plane the following day. Besides stage shots from the concerts (where the second Dublin concert ends in total chaos as fans storm the stage), the film contains scenes from a hotel room in Dublin (where Keith and Mick for fun perform a few Beatles songs as well as a couple of their own), scenes from their train trip to Belfast, another impromptu song session by a piano (with both Keith and Andrew Oldham playing the piano while Mick impersonates Elvis Presley singing "Santa Bring My Baby Back (To Me)" and Fats Domino's version of "Blueberry Hill"), and finally their flight back to London. Intermixed with this are interviews with the band members where they talk about fame, fans and future.

Charlie Is My Darling – Ireland 1965 premiered at the Walter Reade Theater in New York City on 29 September 2012, as part of the 2012 New York Film Festival, and was released on DVD and Blu-ray on 6 November 2012. On 25 November 2012, it was shown by BBC Two as part of BBC's "The Rolling Stones at 50" celebrations.

A Super Deluxe Edition box set of the film versions and audio albums was released 13 November 2012 which contained 2 CDs, 10" vinyl, DVD, Blu-ray and a numbered limited edition enlarged film cell in 200+ unique variations.

== Awards ==
Charlie is My Darling – Ireland 1965 won the Grammy Award for Best Historical Album at 2014's 56th Annual Grammy Awards.

== Live 1965: Music from Charlie Is My Darling ==
Live 1965: Music from Charlie Is My Darling

Live album by The Rolling Stones
- Released: 24 November 2014
- Recorded: 3 and 4 September 1965
- Genre: Rock
- Label: ABKCO

The Rolling Stones chronology
Hyde Park Live (2013)	Live 1965: Music from Charlie Is My Darling (2014)	Totally Stripped (2016)

Live 1965: Music from Charlie Is My Darling, the audio album featuring the songs in the documentary, was released 24 November 2014 on ABKCO Records as a stand-alone release as a digital download and streaming audio.

=== Track listing ===
No.	Title	Writer(s)	Length
1.	"Show Intro"		0:20
2.	"Everybody Needs Somebody to Love"	Jerry Wexler, Bert Berns, Solomon Burke	0:35
3.	"Pain in My Heart"	Naomi Neville	2:03
4.	"Down the Road a Piece"	Don Raye	1:43
5.	"Time Is on My Side"	Norman Meade a.k.a. Jerry Ragovoy	2:51
6.	"I’m Alright"	Ellas McDaniel/Nanker Phelge	2:15
7.	"Off the Hook"	Mick Jagger, Keith Richards	2:27
8.	"Charlie’s intro to Little Red Rooster"	Charlie Watts	0:32
9.	"Little Red Rooster"	Willie Dixon	2:35
10.	"Route 66"	Bobby Troup	2:44
11.	"I’m Moving On"	Clarence E. Snow	2:28
12.	"The Last Time"	Mick Jagger, Keith Richards	3:09
13.	"Everybody Needs Somebody to Love (Finale)"	Jerry Wexler, Bert Berns, Solomon Burke	4:03

== Charts ==
Chart (2012)	Peak position
Argentinian Music DVDs Chart	3
Australian Music DVDs Chart	13
Austrian Music DVDs Chart	3
Danish Music DVDs Chart	5
Dutch Music DVDs Chart	12
German Albums Chart	54
Irish Music DVDs Chart	3
Italian Music DVDs Chart	12
Spanish Music DVDs Chart	14
Swedish Music DVDs Chart	6
Swiss Music DVDs Charts	8
UK Music Videos Chart	11
