= Brent Michael Davids =

American composer and flautist

- Born: June 4, 1959 (age 67); Madison, Wisconsin, United States
- Occupations: Composer and flautist
- Instrument: Flute
- Years active: 1992–present

Brent Michael Davids (born June 4, 1959) is an American composer and flautist.

Davids is a member of the Stockbridge Munsee Community, a Native American tribe. He has composed for Zeitgeist, the Kronos Quartet, Joffrey Ballet, the National Symphony Orchestra, and Chanticleer.

In addition to concert music, Davids writes music for films. He composed music for the 2002 film The Business of Fancydancing and has composed a new score for the American 1920 film The Last of the Mohicans. In 2013, he was honored with a NACF Artist Fellowship in Music.

== Early life ==
Brent Michael Davids was born in Madison, Wisconsin, but his family moved to Chicago during his early childhood. His father worked in the telephone business while also being a skilled craftsman outside of work. His mother was a piano teacher and choral director. Early in life, Brent studied piano and music theory under the rigorous training of his mother. Concurrently, he would learn about telecom and audio technology as well as crafting metal, glass, and crystal. In his education prior to college, Brent played a trombone and flute while also budding his early skills as a composer. His early experience and influence of his parents would help shape his future success.

== Education ==
Upon completing high school, Brent Michael Davids went to Northern Illinois University, graduating with a B.M. in music composition in 1981. During this time, he also crafted his first designs for his signature quartz flutes. Soon after, he earned his M.M. degree in music composition from Arizona State University in 1990. He pursued an M.A. in American Indian religious studies from Arizona State University.

Some of his other studies include Robert Redford's Sundance Institute for film score and with film composer Stephen Warbeck.

== Career ==
Stylistically, Davids's compositions are often described as ambient with much credence toward film score, postmodernism, and customary Indigenous American techniques. Many of his scores are written and published with graphic notation, being works of visual as well and musical art. Brent Michael Davids has works premiered and performed from venues as vast as New Mexico Symphony Orchestra to inaugural events in Moscow Russia. He has even crafted several flute and percussion instruments of his own designs. Said instruments include bird calls, crystal straight and transverse flutes, and even water-based instruments that incorporate crystal objects of various designs. His works range from solo flute and flute quartet to even band and choral ensemble. In 2015, he premiered his opera "Purchase of Manhattan".

Davids founded the Native American Composer Apprentice Program in Arizona during his time in Arizona. Later in life, he moved to St. Paul, Minnesota and founded the Composer Apprentice National Outreach Endeavor while also holding other academic posts. He recently founded a recording studio on the Stockbridge-Munsee Reservation in Wisconsin.

Davids is an active participant with the First Nations Composer Initiative. He has also served as Composer-in-Residence with the Native American Composers Apprenticeship Project.

== Personal life ==
He lives in Saint Paul, Minnesota.

== Discography ==
- 1992 - Brent Michael Davids. Ní-tCâng. Blue Butterfly Group.
- 2002 - The Business of Fancydancing. FallsApart Records/RezRoad.
- 2002 - Chanticleer. Our American Journey. Contains The Un-covered Wagon by Brent Michael Davids. Teldec.
- 2003 - The Nebraska Children's Chorus and Bel Canto, dir. Z. Randall Stroope. Homeland. Contains Zuni Sunrise Song by Brent Michael Davids (1995).
- 2011 - Valor's Kids
