= Everybody Glows B Sides & Rarities =

Everybody Glows: B-Sides & Rarities

Studio album by Kaki King
- Released: November 4, 2014
- Genre: Acoustic music
- Length: 1:02:48
- Producer: D. James Goodwin

Everybody Glows is an album by Kaki King, released on November 4, 2014. It features a collection of outtakes, demos, covers, live versions and tracks from demo CDs. The collection reveals the evolution of her songwriting while offering a glimpse of a young guitarist doing daring things on her instrument. The album comes with a track-by-track explanation of each song, along with liner notes written by her father. This is the first album Kaki released on her own label, Short Stuff Records.

== Track listing ==
All songs written by Kaki King except "Anthem for the Earnest" (written by David King), "Close to Me" (written by Robert Smith) and "Lovestoned" (written by Justin Timberlake, Tim Mosley and Nate "Danja" Hills).

No.	Title	Length
1.	"Sunrise at Wildflower Hill Retirement Center"	2:56
2.	"Zamzam Well (live)"	3:58
3.	"Anthem for the Earnest"	3:09
4.	"Sad American (live)"	3:06
5.	"Tunnel"	1:46
6.	"Goby (live, featuring Dan Brantigan and Matt Hankle)"	7:27
7.	"Waltz for the Alone"	4:05
8.	"So Much for So Little (demo)"	3:06
9.	"Close to Me"	3:31
10.	"Hairs"	2:19
11.	"Brazilian With Drums (featuring Dave Treut)"	5:24
12.	"Old Crow and the Miner's Daughter"	3:42
13.	"L Train 1st Ave: Low"	3:44
14.	"Lovestoned"	3:04
15.	"Zeitgeist"	6:30
16.	"Meserole (featuring Dave Treut) (Bonus Track)"	5:01
Total length:		1:02:48
