= Dojo (disambiguation) =

A dōjō is a hall or space for immersive learning or meditation (typically in martial arts, but increasingly in other fields, such as software development).

Dojo may also refer to:

== Arts and entertainment ==
=== Music ===
- Dojo (instrument), a musical instrument
- Dōjō (band), musical duo of koto player Michiyo Yagi and drummer Tamaya Honda

=== Film ===
- Dojo (2023 film), a martial arts short film

=== Fictional entities ===
- Dojo (G.I. Joe), a fictional character in the G.I. Joe universe
- Dojo Kanojo Cho, a character in the television series Xiaolin Showdown
- Dojo Delivery, a courier service in the television series Get Ed

== Science and technology ==
- Dojo loach, a freshwater fish
- Dojo Toolkit, a JavaScript library
- Tesla Dojo, a planned training supercomputer

== Other uses ==
- Dojo, the temple name of Yi Chun, grandfather of King Taejo of Joseon

== See also ==
- DoJa, Java application environment specification
