= Junior (Kaki King album) =

Studio album by Kaki King
- Released: April 13, 2010
- Genre: Rock
- Length: 46:46
- Label: Rounder
- Producer: Malcolm Burn

Kaki King chronology
| Mexican Teenagers EP (2009) | Junior (2010) | Glow (2012) |

Junior, the fifth full-length album by American guitarist Kaki King, was released April 13, 2010.

== Track listing ==
All tracks are written by Kaki King.

| No. | Title | Length |
|---|---|---|
| 1. | "The Betrayer" | 3:54 |
| 2. | "Spit It Back in my Mouth" | 4:00 |
| 3. | "Everything Has an End, Even Sadness" | 3:46 |
| 4. | "Falling Day" | 5:29 |
| 5. | "The Hoopers of Hudspeth" | 4:50 |
| 6. | "My Nerves That Committed Suicide" | 4:43 |
| 7. | "Communist Friends" | 4:01 |
| 8. | "Hallucinations From My Poisonous German Streets" | 4:24 |
| 9. | "Death Head" | 4:14 |
| 10. | "Sloan Shore" | 3:48 |
| 11. | "Sunnyside" | 3:33 |

== Critical reception ==
Professional ratings
Review scores
| Source | Rating |
|---|---|
| Allmusic | 3/5 stars |
| Blare Magazine | 4/5 stars |

Writing for Allmusic, music critic Thom Jurek wrote "The mood of the recording is dark, even angry, though there are certain themes of political intrigue amid personal turmoil... The biggest drawback, one that can make the listener tire of the album long before it ends, is her terminally flat, undisciplined voice. More often than not, her compelling song structures suffer because of it." BLARE Magazine called it "everything her admirers... revel in, but cocooned in an indie rock shell that’s rigid on the outside with a tender core. Both her words and guitar licks are poetic and spiteful, as they portray King’s instrumental ability to produce guitar melodies that tease, anger and even drug, a trait some modern guitarists in this lifetime severely lack." Jessica Hopper of Spin wrote, "King sounds wholly at home commanding an indie-rock power trio. Junior could be just the thing for still-mourning Sleater-Kinney fans or anyone who likes their licks righteous and their indignation more so."

== Personnel ==
- Kaki King – guitars, vocals
- Jordan Perlson – drums
- Dan Brantigan – multiple instruments
- Matt Hankle – drums on Falling Day

== Production ==
- Malcolm Burn – producer
