= Dayna Kurtz =

American singer/songwriter

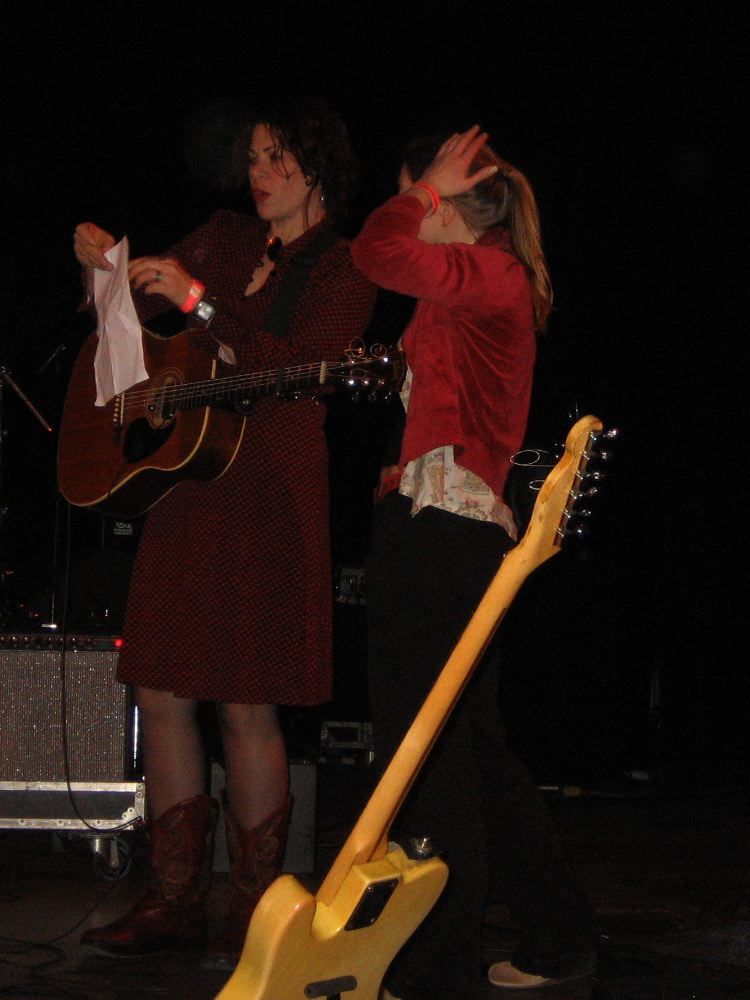

Background information
- Genres: Jazz, folk, Americana
- Occupations: Songwriter, producer, musician
- Instruments: Vocals, guitar
- Years active: 1989–present
- Label: Kismet Records
- Website: www.daynakurtz.com

Dayna Kurtz is an American singer/songwriter. Her music is a blend of jazz, folk, pop and blues. She began her career in 1989, touring small stages up and down the East Coast, promoting her work with a sparse but haunting self-recorded demo tape. She was named Female Songwriter of the Year in 1997 by the National Academy of Songwriters.

Norah Jones (who duets on Duke Ellington's "I Got It Bad And That Ain't Good" on Kurtz's 2004 album Beautiful Yesterday) and Bonnie Raitt have raved about Kurtz in interviews, and she's performed on the radio shows World Cafe, Mountain Stage and NPR's Morning Edition and Tell Me More.

She has toured as a supporting act with Elvis Costello, Richard Thompson, Mavis Staples, Dr. John, B.B. King, Richie Havens, Rufus Wainwright, Keren Ann, Chris Whitley, and The Blind Boys of Alabama.

Kurtz has recorded two Secret Canon albums, collecting obscure standards and blues and R&B gems originally recorded in the 1940s, 1950s and 1960s.

Critic James Reed of the Boston Globe wrote in a review of Beautiful Yesterday that "there's no logical reason why singer-songwriter Dayna Kurtz is not a full-blown star".

In 2015 Dayna Kurtz released Rise and Fall, which features "You’re Not What I Needed (But You’re All That I Want)", which she called her "Dan Penn" song.

The Here Volume 1 and Volume 2 albums are a compilation of great songs by Dayna, which were recorded during a live tour in the Netherlands in 2016. Dayna is accompanied by guitarist Robert Maché.

In December 2017 Dayna started a new blues dance band called Lulu and the Broadsides. Next to Dayna the other band members are James Singleton, Carlo Nuccio, Robert Mache and Glenn Hartman. In 2019 the band released its first EP.

== Discography ==
=== Albums ===
- 1997: Otherwise Luscious Life - live / (Deebles Music - OUT OF PRINT)
- 2002: Postcards From Downtown / (Kismet Records, US) - featuring ETHEL
- 2003: Love Gets in the Way / CD Single (Munich Records/Europe)
- 2003: Postcards From Amsterdam (Live in Concert DVD) / (Munich Records, Europe, Kismet, USA)
- 2004: Beautiful Yesterday / (Kismet Records, US) - featuring ETHEL
- 2004: The Beautiful Yesterday Sessions LIMITED EDITION EP / (Kismet Records US, online only)
- 2006: Nola / (Munich Records/Europe)
- 2006: Another Black Feather / (Kismet Records US)
- 2009: american standard / (Munich Records, Europe, Kismet, USA)
- 2010: For the Love of Hazel: Songs for Hazel Dickens - Dayna Kurtz & Mamie Minch (6 tracks)
- 2012: Secret Canon Vol. 1
- 2013: Secret Canon Vol. 2
- 2015: Rise and Fall
- 2017: Here Volume 1
- 2018: Here Volume 2

=== Other contributions ===
- Live at the World Café: Vol. 15 - Handcrafted (2002, World Café) - "Love Gets in the Way"
- 107.1 KGSR Radio Austin - Broadcasts Vol.10 (2002) - "Love Gets in the Way"
