= Kaki King =

American guitarist and composer (born 1979)

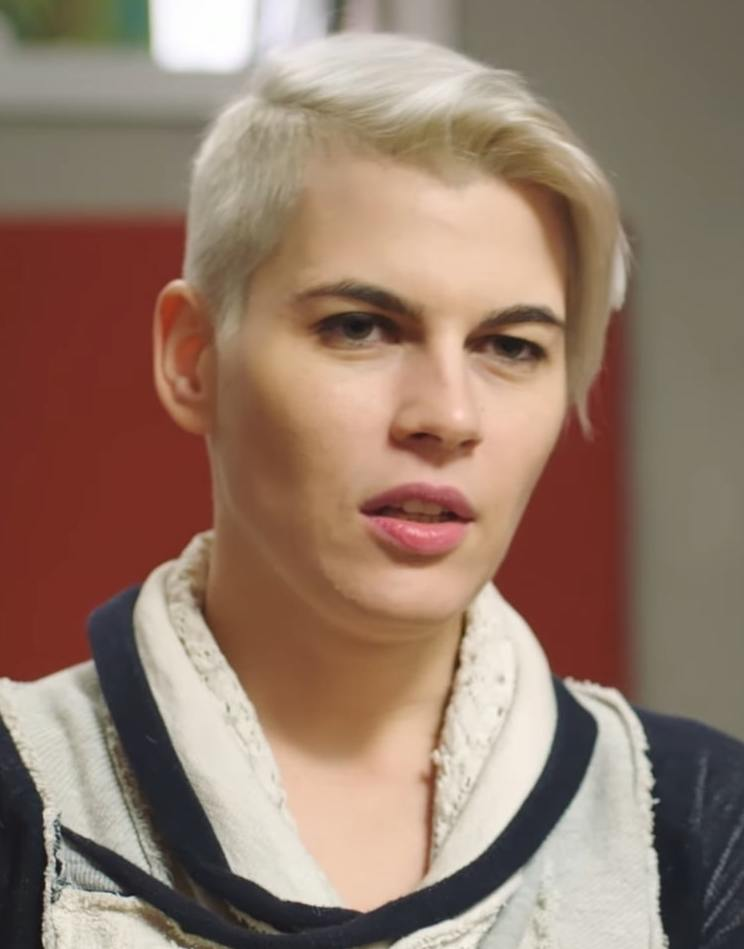
- King in 2016

Background information
- Born: Katherine Elizabeth King; August 24, 1979 (age 47); Atlanta, Georgia, U.S.
- Genres: Instrumental music, post-rock, shoegazing
- Occupations: Musician, composer
- Instruments: Guitar, lap steel guitar, drums, piano, vocals, ukulele, dojo
- Years active: 2001–present
- Labels: Velour, Sony, Cooking Vinyl
- Spouse: Jessica Templin (m. 2012)
- Website: KakiKing.com

Kaki King (born Katherine Elizabeth King, August 24, 1979) is an American guitarist and composer. King is known for her percussive and jazz-tinged melodies, energetic live shows, use of multiple tunings on acoustic and lap steel guitar, and her diverse range in different genres.

In February 2006, Rolling Stone released a list of "The New Guitar Gods", on which King was the sole woman and youngest artist (beating Derek Trucks in age by two months as the youngest on the list). Her career includes six LP and three EP albums, as well as several scores for television and film. She worked alongside Eddie Vedder and Michael Brook contributing music for the soundtrack to Sean Penn's Into the Wild, for which the trio received nominations for a Golden Globe Award for Best Original Score.

== Childhood and early life ==
King was born the first of two daughters. While still a small child, her father noticed her natural musical ability, and encouraged her interest in music. She was introduced to the guitar at the age of four and played for several years, but after taking up the drums a few years later, they became her primary instruments as an adolescent.

Convinced that her break in music would come from drumming, King played in bands in high school with classmate Morgan Jahnig, who would later become the bassist of Old Crow Medicine Show. On graduating from The Westminster Schools in Atlanta in 1998, the two friends attended New York University. While there, King picked up the guitar again, and revisited the finger-style techniques that intrigued her as a child. While at NYU she studied with Bill Rayner, a professor of guitar. From there, King played a few occasional gigs and busked in the New York City Subway.

== Career ==
=== Early career ===
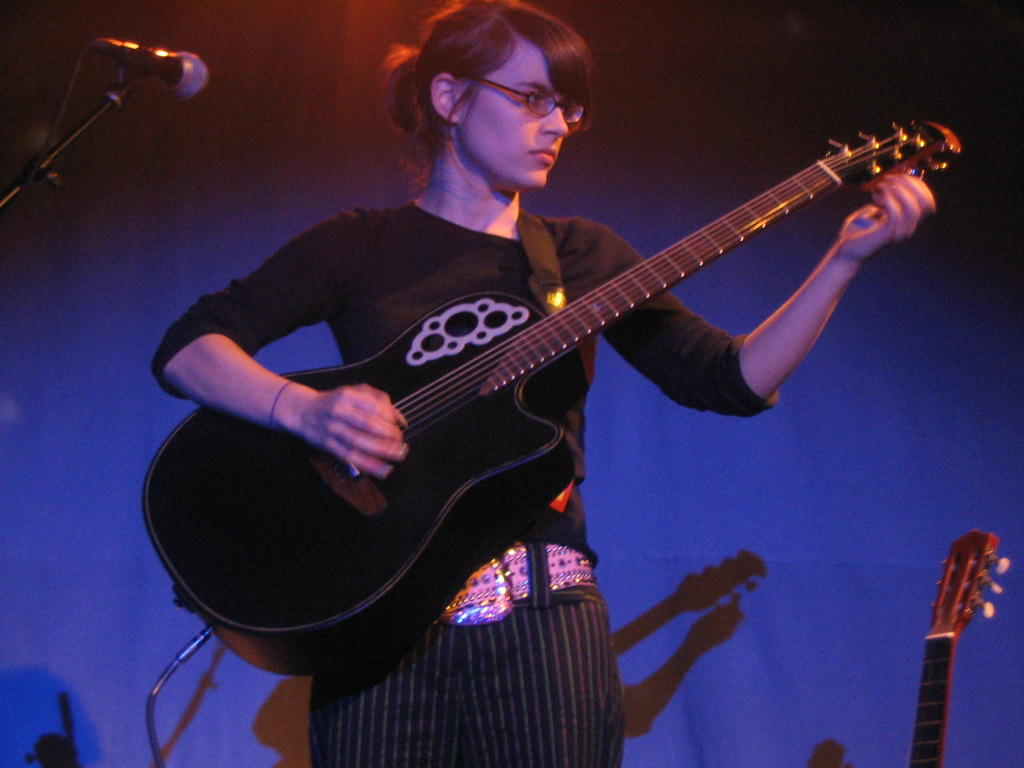
King in 2004

After signing with Velour Records in 2002, King began recording her debut album, Everybody Loves You. She incorporated fingerstyle "fanning," with both flamenco style percussion and fret tapping techniques, as well as using double open tunings, viola tunings, and traditional Russian guitar (7 strings). On April 22, 2003, Everybody Loves You was released to positive reviews and feedback on King's skills as a guitarist in relation to her age. While her later work involves more of a band format, Everybody Loves You is King's only fully acoustic guitar album, with the exception of light singing on the hidden bonus track, "The Government." To support the album, King embarked on her first major promotional tour in North America.

After King appeared on Late Night with Conan O'Brien, Sony Records offered her a deal with Epic records' Red Ink label. From there, King headed back into the studio to work on her sophomore effort, Legs to Make Us Longer. King began to incorporate different instruments and sound effects into her album, such as looping, light drum work on "Doing the Wrong Thing", and her first incorporation of Lap steel guitar with "My Insect Life." Produced by David Torn, Legs to Make Us Longer was released on Epic's Red Ink Imprint on October 5, 2004 to strong reviews. In support of the album, King performed as an opening act for Eric Johnson during a leg of his 2005 tour, as well as completing her own nationwide and world tour.

=== Change in musical style and sound ===
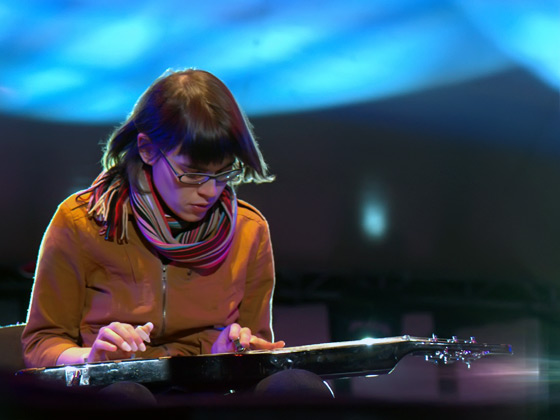
King, playing a lap steel guitar in the Adelaide International Guitar Festival

At the end of her tour for Legs to Make Us Longer in 2005, King departed from her previous musical direction out of a desire to escape being pigeonholed as a solo instrumental artist. She amicably parted ways with major label Sony/Epic and returned to her original label, Velour, to begin work on her third album ...Until We Felt Red. Released August 8, 2006, on Velour Records, the album features production work by Tortoise's John McEntire. With the prominence of electric guitar shoegazing and effect boxes on the new record, and the addition of a full band, the music website, The A.V. Club, called the sound a "post-rock makeover." She supported the album by going on tour with Sarah Bettens from K's Choice. In early 2007, Dave Grohl invited King to appear as a guitarist on the track "Ballad of the Beaconsfield Miners", a song penned by Grohl for an upcoming studio album by the Foo Fighters. King agreed and is credited on the album, entitled Echoes, Silence, Patience & Grace, released on September 25, 2007. On November 18, 2007, she joined Dave Grohl on stage to perform the track at the O2 arena in London. Grohl highly praised King's performance:

There are some guitar players that are good and there are some guitar players that are really fucking good. And then there's Kaki King.

King toured with the Foo Fighters on the Australian leg of the Echoes, Silence, Patience and Grace tour. While on tour, King finished recording what became the Day Sleeper (Australian tour EP). It was released in late 2007 after King had finished working on August Rush, and with Eddie Vedder and Sean Penn on Into The Wild.

=== Further changes in sound ===
King recruited Malcolm Burn to help with her next album, Dreaming of Revenge, and in December 2007 wrote about it in her blog: "I finished the new album. Don't get your panties in a tangle, it won't be released until next year, but it's done. And it's amazing." Filled with more melodic pop tunes than previous albums, Dreaming of Revenge was released on March 11, 2008 to highly positive reviews. On March 4, 2008, iTunes released a full version of Dreaming of Revenge featuring the bonus track "I Need A Girl Who Knows A Map". After filming a video for "Pull Me Out Alive", she began her tour.

In the first half of King's tour, she headlined at The Roxy and toured with The Mountain Goats, which led to the exclusive release of Kaki King and The Mountain Goats EP Black Pear Tree EP. While touring Australia in 2008, King filmed part of the music video "Can Anyone Who Has Heard This Music Really Be A Bad Person?" in Sydney. Directed by Michael Ebner, the rest of the video was completed in New York in 2009. After completing the last leg of her world tour, King decided to tour once again with a strictly acoustic show. Dubbed 'The "No Bullshit" Tour', King did smaller shows throughout the US and UK that were specifically focused on acoustic works from her first albums along with stripped-down versions of her newer songs.

After completing her "No Bullshit Tour," King scored work on the independent film How I Got Lost, and started to record her next EP, titled Mexican Teenagers EP. Recruiting her band that she used from Dreaming of Revenge, King cut five new tracks for her new album.

==== Junior ====
After meeting with Carter Burwell to start work on the scoring for the Twilight movies, and completing work on Timbaland's Shock Value II (which became Miley Cyrus' "We Belong to the Music"), King began to outline her ideals for her 5th record. King's interest in Cold War novels, Russian spies and espionage themes, particularly that of double spies living in a double life, became the basis for her new album, Junior. Ranging lyrically "from exuberance and anger to heartbreaking melancholy, and sonically from experimental pieces to accessible pop," Junior showcases her further maturation as a well-rounded artist that continues to defy categorization and expectations.

As with her previous album, 2008's Dreaming of Revenge, Junior was produced by Malcolm Burn and recorded at his studio in Kingston, New York. But in contrast to that record, which was marked by deep textures and layers as well as unusual instrumentation, Junior was specifically made with only three musicians in mind – in this case King, multi-instrumentalist Dan Brantigan and drummer Jordan Perlson. The result was something more direct. "Prior to this I would have written a lot in the studio and played all the instruments myself," King says. "This time, I really leaned on Dan and Jordan to help shape the songs and help me get the record written."

King toured for five weeks in Europe in support of her LP Junior, on the Cooking Vinyl label. She later appeared as the musical guest on Late Night with Jimmy Fallon, sitting in with The Roots as a part of the house band, and began a US-based tour.

When asked by Premier Guitar Magazine what her plans were after completing her tour, King responded "I've been on the road for four months straight. In another three weeks, we'll be done with this tour. Honestly, that's about as far as I can see."

==== Traveling Freak Guitar Show ====
King returned to her roots as a solo acoustic performer in 2011, going on her first tour without a backing band since 2005. King planned a tour with a collection of seven instruments including a harp guitar, dojo, a custom 7-string nylon string guitar with fanned fret board, and a hybrid between a guitar and koto that King made herself. Before beginning the tour, King performed with some of these instruments at the opening of an exhibit of Picasso's guitar paintings at the Museum of Modern Art in New York. The tour began on February 24 in Mexico City and ended on April 9, 2011 in Binghamton.

=== Guitar Art Show ===
In 2009, King conceived of an art show in which twelve different artists would be commissioned to create visual pieces themed after her songs, using the guitar as the primary artistic medium. As King described it,

What I want to do is to meet twelve amazing artists, give them each a blank guitar, and let them go wild creating anything their heart desires. The theme of each piece would be the title of one of my songs.

The final total came to fifteen distinct pieces which were then put on display for a one-night exhibition at The Littlefield in Brooklyn. During the exhibit, King provided her own contribution by covering her hands in pink paint and performing her song, 'Playing with Pink Noise', leaving the guitar covered in pink fingerprints.

=== Everybody Glows: B-sides & Rarities ===
On November 4, 2014, Kaki released her first B-sides and rarities album entitled, Everybody Glows. The album features a collection of outtakes, demos, covers, live versions and never before heard recordings culled from scratched demo CDs, long-forgotten hard drives, and the fuzzier corners of her memory. The collection reveals the evolution of her songwriting while offering a glimpse of a young guitarist doing daring things on her instrument before she grasped the significance of any of it. The album comes with a track-by-track explanation of each song, along with liner notes written by her father. This is the first album Kaki released on her own label, Short Stuff Records.

=== The Neck Is a Bridge to the Body ===
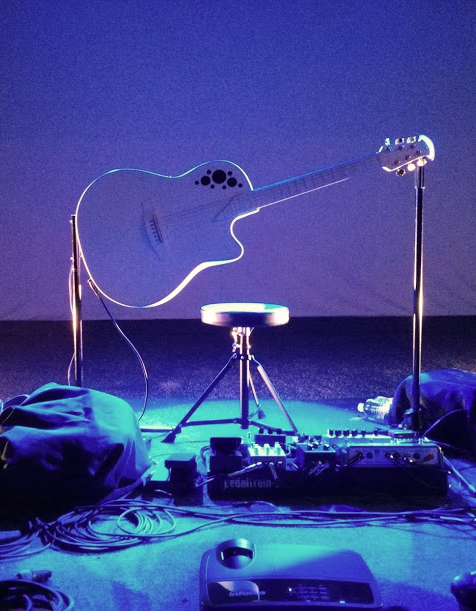
The guitar used by King for The Neck Is a Bridge to the Body, with the projector used to create images on the guitar in the foreground. (Austin, Texas, February 2015)

In 2014, King collaborated with the visual experience company Glowing Pictures to construct a multimedia production in which the guitar is used as a projection screen to tell a story. The hour-long production entitled The Neck Is a Bridge to the Body places the focus on the guitar itself. Projections of a creation myth including genesis and death were cast onto Ovation Adamas 1581-KK Kaki King Signature 6-String Acoustic guitar customized specifically for the production.

"The Guitar is a shape-shifter," King says, "something that plays all types of music and really fills all kinds of roles. It's not always the six-string guitar that we all know and love. I've been playing guitar for more than 30 years. It's who I am and if anything, this project has made me even more familiar with it."

The Neck Is a Bridge to the Body debuted at Brooklyn's BRIC Theater in New York City in 2014, and was to tour extensively in 2015. An album featuring the music from the show will also be released on March 3, 2015 on King's label, Short Stuff Records.

In August 2017, King made a course on digital pedalboards with online music education platform Soundfly, demonstrating many of the techniques she used in The Neck Is a Bridge to the Body tour performances.

=== Modern Yesterdays ===
In 2019, King debuted a theatrical piece called DATA NOT FOUND, incorporating monologue, set design, lighting design, and audio-reactive sound design. After working with sound designer Chloe Alexandra Thompson to develop the sound design for DATA NOT FOUND, King expanded upon the music written for the show, co-producing the album with Chloe Alexandra Thompson and Arjan Miranda. The album also incorporates a new invention, the passerelle bridge, designed by King in collaboration with Providence-based luthier Rachel Rosenkrantz, which is a guitar accessory that gives the guitar a Koto-like tone.

The album was recorded in New York City in early March 2020, mere days before the first city-wide COVID-19 shutdowns. “We all gave each other COVID while we were making the record," King explained. Once everyone recovered, it became clear that tour plans would have to be postponed, but King decided to proceed with the release of the record. She adds, “It's sort of shocking that it even got done, given the timeframe."

The album Modern Yesterdays was released on October 23, 2020, on Cantaloupe Music.

Inspired by the album and its source inspirations, King produced MODERN YESTERDAYS (the live show titled after the album), showcasing audio-reactive designs for both the guitar and snare drum. The live show debuted worldwide and online in late October 2020, first recorded at the Ferst Center for the Arts in Atlanta, Georgia. MODERN YESTERDAYS debuted in front of a live audience at Lincoln Center in New York City in September 2021. It is currently touring extensively around the world.

== Style, techniques and instruments ==
As a long-time Ovation player, King was invited to design her own custom guitar, the result being the Adamas 1581-KK model. Each guitar is signed by King, and she can be seen playing it often on tour and in the DVD for Tegan And Sara's The Con.

King's fingerstyle playing combines fret-tapping with slap bass techniques, using the guitar for percussive beats, as well as sound layering and looping. Her playing style has been compared to Michael Hedges and Preston Reed, the latter of whom she explicitly cites as an influence.

King uses Elixir Strings, particularly the Acoustic Light Guitar Strings on her custom Ovation Adamas guitar, and is a featured artist on the company's website.

== Personal life ==
King married Jessica Templin in October 2012, giving Templin her surname. They honeymooned in Australia, where King played at the Peats Ridge Festival. The couple has two children.

== Discography ==
Studio albums

- Everybody Loves You (2003)
- Legs to Make Us Longer (2004)
- ...Until We Felt Red (2006)
- Dreaming of Revenge (2008)
- Junior (2010)
- Glow (2012)
- Everybody Glows B Sides & Rarities (2014)
- The Neck Is a Bridge to the Body (2015)
- Modern Yesterdays (2020)
- Sei with Tamar Eisenman (2025)

Extended plays

- Black Pear Tree with the Mountain Goats (2008)
- Mexican Teenagers (2009)
- Tutto Passa (2025)
- Stop Sometime (2025)
- Infinite Ache (2026)

=== Live albums ===
- Live at Berklee with Porta Girevole Chamber Orchestra (2017)
