= Jerod Impichchaachaaha' Tate =

Chickasaw composer and pianist (b.1968)

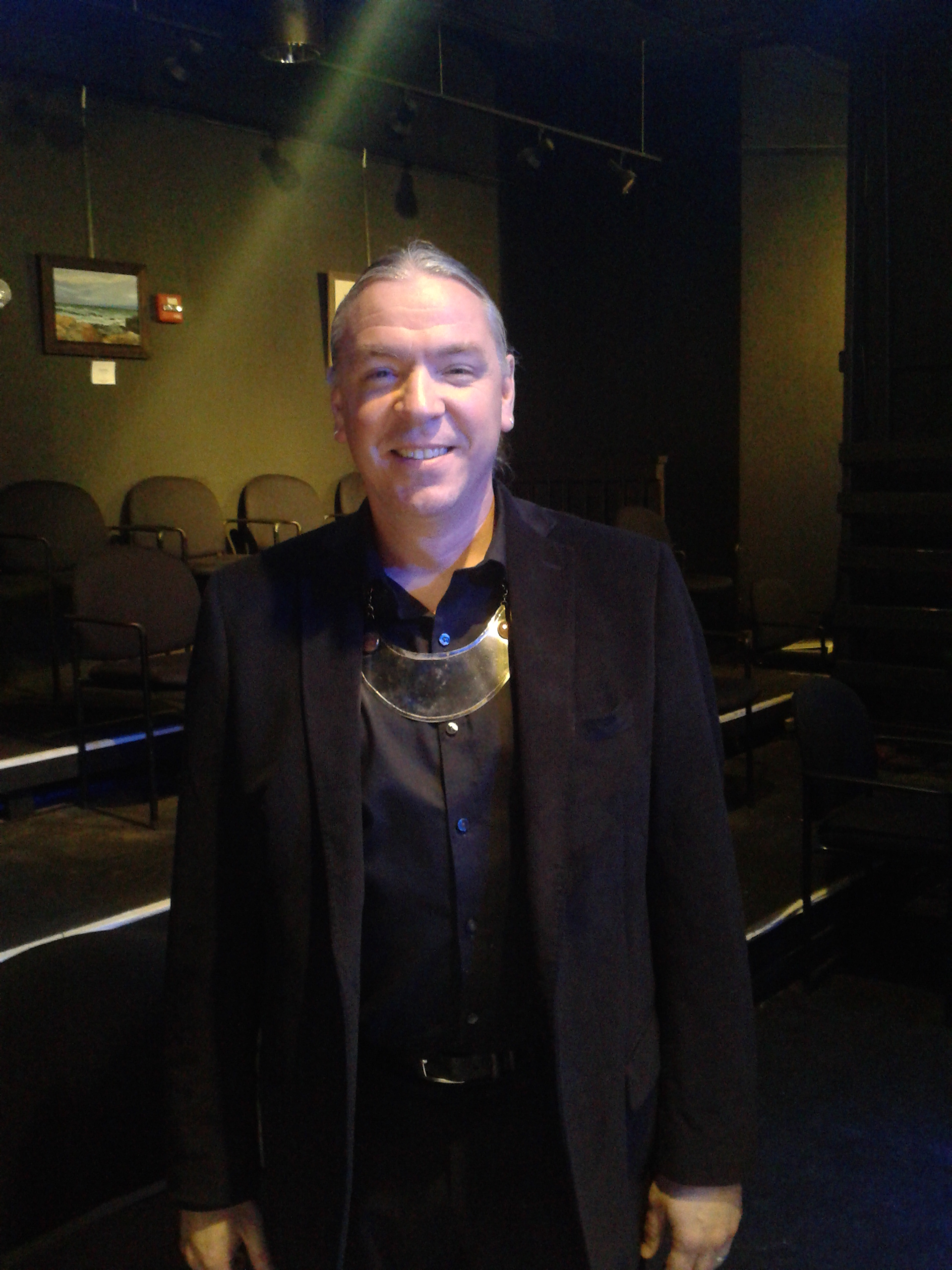
- Tate in 2016

Background information
- Born: July 25, 1968 (age 58); Norman, Oklahoma, U.S.
- Origin: Chickasaw Nation
- Genre: Classical
- Occupation: Composer
- Instrument: Piano

Jerod Impichchaachaaha' Tate (Impichchaachaaha', lit. 'His High Corncrib'), born July 25, 1968) is a Chickasaw classical composer and pianist. His compositions are inspired by North American Indian history, culture and ethos.

He has had several commissioned works, which have been performed by major orchestras in Washington, DC; San Francisco, Detroit, and Minneapolis, among others. When the San Francisco Symphony Chorus performed and recorded his work Iholba' in 2008, it was the first time the chorus had sung any work in Chickasaw or any American Indian language.

He is founder and artistic director of the Chickasaw Chamber Music Festival. He was Co-Founder and Composition Instructor for the Chickasaw Summer Arts Academy.

== Biography ==
Jerod Impichchaachaaha' Tate was born in 1968 in Norman, Oklahoma, is a citizen of the Chickasaw Nation in Oklahoma, and is dedicated to the development of American Indian classical composition. His middle name, Impichchaachaaha', means “his high corncrib” and is his inherited traditional Chickasaw house name. A corncrib is a small hut used for the storage of corn and other vegetables. In traditional Chickasaw culture, the corncrib was built high off the ground on stilts to keep its contents safe from foraging animals.

Tate is a 2022 Chickasaw Hall of Fame inductee, a 2022 Distinguished Alumni Award recipient from The Cleveland Institute of Music and was appointed 2021 Cultural Ambassador for the U. S. Department of State. He is Guest Composer, conductor, and pianist for San Francisco Symphony's Currents Program, Thunder Song: American Indian Musical Cultures, and was recently Guest Composer for Metropolitan Museum of Art's Balcony Bar Program, Home with ETHEL and Friends, featuring his commissioned work Pisachi (Reveal) for String Quartet.

His commissioned works have been performed by the National Symphony Orchestra, San Francisco Symphony and Chorus, Dallas Symphony Orchestra, Detroit Symphony Orchestra, Minnesota Orchestra, Buffalo Philharmonic Orchestra, Oklahoma City Philharmonic, Winnipeg Symphony Orchestra, South Dakota Symphony Orchestra, Colorado Ballet, Canterbury Voices, Dale Warland Singers, Santa Fe Desert Chorale and Santa Fe Chamber Music Festival. Recent commissions include Shell Shaker: A Chickasaw Opera for Mount Holyoke Symphony Orchestra, Ghost of the White Deer, Concerto for Bassoon and Orchestra for Dallas Symphony Orchestra, Hózhó (Navajo Strong) and Ithánali (I Know) for White Snake Opera Company. His music was recently featured on the HBO series Westworld.

Tate has held Composer-in-Residence positions for Music Alive, a national residency program of the League of American Orchestras and New Music USA, First Americans Museum, the Joyce Foundation/American Composers Forum, Oklahoma City's NewView Summer Academy, Oklahoma Medical Research Foundation and Grand Canyon Music Festival Native American Composer Apprentice Project. Tate was the founding composition instructor for the Chickasaw Summer Arts Academy and has taught composition to American Indian high school students in Minneapolis, the Hopi, Navajo, and Lummi reservations and Native students in Toronto.

Tate is a three-time commissioned recipient from the American Composers Forum, a Chamber Music America's Classical Commissioning Program recipient, a Cleveland Institute of Music Alumni Achievement Award recipient, a governor-appointed Creativity Ambassador for the State of Oklahoma and an Emmy Award-winner for his work on the Oklahoma Educational Television Authority documentary, The Science of Composing.

In addition to his work based upon his Chickasaw culture, Tate has worked with the music and language of multiple tribes, such as: Choctaw, Navajo, Cherokee, Ojibway, Creek, Pechanga, Comanche, Lakota, Hopi, Tlingit, Lenape, Tongva, Shawnee, Caddo, Ute, Aleut, Shoshone, Cree, Paiute, and Salish/Kootenai.

Among available recorded works are Iholba‘ (The Vision) for Solo Flute, Orchestra and Chorus and Tracing Mississippi, Concerto for Flute and Orchestra, recorded by the San Francisco Symphony Orchestra and Chorus, on the Grammy Award-winning label Azica Records. In 2021, Azica released Tate's Lowak Shoppala' (Fire and Light) recorded by Nashville String Machine with the Chickasaw Nation Children's Chorus and Dance Troupe; vocal soloists Stephen Clark, Chelsea Owen, Meghan Vera Starling; and narrators Lynne Moroney, Wes Studi, Richard Ray Whitman. Of the album, Sequenza21 wrote, “Tate has clearly taken the Western musical tradition and found a compelling voice that integrates his native culture.” His Metropolitan Museum of Art commission, Pisachi (Reveal), is featured on ETHEL String Quartet's album Documerica. Azica Records recently released Tate's inaugural composition, Winter Moons, and his MoonStrike, recorded by Apollo Chamber Players.

Tate earned his Bachelor of Music in Piano Performance from Northwestern University, where he studied with Dr. Donald Isaak, and his Master of Music in Piano Performance and Composition from The Cleveland Institute of Music, where he studied with Elizabeth Pastor and Dr. Donald Erb. He has performed as First Keyboard on the Broadway national tours of Les Misérables and Miss Saigon and been a guest composer/pianist and accompanist for the Colorado Ballet, Hartford Ballet, and numerous ballet and dance companies.

== Reception ==
In reviewing a performance of Iholba’ (The Vision), for Solo Flute, Orchestra and Chorus, which was commissioned by the National Symphony Orchestra and premiered at the Kennedy Center for the Performing Arts, The Washington Post said, “Tate's connection to nature and the human experience was quite apparent in this piece...rarer still is his ability to effectively infuse classical music with American Indian nationalism.”

The Washington Post selected him as one of “22 for ’22: Composers and performers to watch this year” and raved that “Tate is rare as an American Indian composer of classical music. Rarer still is his ability to effectively infuse classical music with American Indian nationalism.”

== Works ==
=== Commissioned works ===
- Ghost of the White Deer Concerto for Bassoon and Orchestra - Dallas Symphony Orchestra (2020)
- Muscogee Hymn Suite for Solo Baritone, Children's Chorus and Orchestra - Tulsa Symphony (2016)
- Standing Bear: A Ponca Indian Cantata for Solo Baritone, Piano and String Sextet - Hidegard Center for the Arts (2015)
- Misha’ Sipokni' (The Old Ground) Oratorio for Orchestra, Chorus, Children's Chorus, Baritone, Tenor and Soprano – Canterbury Choral Society (2015)
- Oka’ Aya’sha’ (The Water Place) for Chorus, Woodwinds and Percussion – University of Chicago/Canterbury Choral Society (2014)
- Pisachi (You See), (2013), for String Quartet, commissioned by ETHEL for ETHEL's Documerica, premiered at BAM's Next Wave Festival 2013
- Waktégli Olówaŋ (Victory Songs) for Baritone Solo and Orchestra – South Dakota Symphony (2012)
- Visions of a Child (A Pueblo Lullaby) for Chorus – Santa Fe Desert Chorale (2012)
- Theme music for To the Wonder – Directed by Terrence Malick (2012)
- Taloowa’ Chipota (Children's Songs) for Youth Choir – American Composers Forum ChoralQuest Program (2011)
- À Bec Quintet (2009), Woodwind Quintet composed for R. Carlos Nakai, premiered at the Santa Fe Chamber Music Festival.
- Shakamaxon for String Orchestra – Philadelphia Classical Symphony (2007)
- Nitoshi’ Imali, Concerto for Guitar and Orchestra – Joyce Foundation (2006)
- Lowak Shoppala’ (Fire and Light) (2006), for Orchestra, Children's Chorus, Baritone, Soprano and Narrators - American Composers Forum Continental Harmony Project
- Film score for Indian Country Diaries: A Seat at the Drum – Native American Public Telecommunications/Adanvdo Productions, Lincoln, NE (2005)
- Worth of the Soul: A Tribute to American Indian Warriors for Symphonic Wind Ensemble and Chorus – Matthew Inkster/Mercyhurst College, Erie, PA (2004)
- Tracing Mississippi, Concerto for Flute and Orchestra – Christine Bailey, Principal Flute of the Buffalo Philharmonic Orchestra (2002)
- Iholba' (The Vision) for Solo Flute, Orchestra and Chorus – National Symphony Orchestra (1999)
- Dream World for Woodwinds, Percussion and Narrator – New Jersey Chamber Music Society (1997)
- Garfish Song for Chorus and Piano – The Dale Warland Singers, Minneapolis, MN (1997)
- Diva Ojibway, Operetta Score – Native Earth Performing Arts Society, Toronto, ON (1994)
- Film score for First Americans Journal – Native American Television, Minneapolis, MN (1994)
- Iyaaknasha’ for Double Bass and Orchestra – James VanDemark, double bass faculty, Eastman School of Music (1993)
- Winter Moons, Ballet Score – Patricia Tate/University of Wyoming (1991)

=== Other chamber works ===
- Talowa' Hiloha (Thunder Song) for Solo Timpani Premiered May 7, 1997
- Inchokkillissa for Guitar and Percussion Premiered April 24, 1994
- Oktibihah for Solo Timpani, Strings and Piano Premiered 1994

=== Film and media ===
- To the Wonder – Terence Mallick (2012)
- Spider Brings Fire – Chickasaw Nation (2010)
- Meeting in the Center with Respect – Fort Collins Museum (2009)
- Indian Country Diaries: A Seat at the Drum – Native American Public Telecommunications/Adanvdo Productions (2005)
- American Composer Forum – promotional DVD (2003)
- First Americans Journal – Native American Television (1994)

== Honors ==
- 2025 - Academy of Arts and Letters Inductee
- 2024 - United States Artists Fellowship
- 2023 - Barlow Commission in Music Composition
- 2022 - Cultural Ambassador - United States of America Department of State
- 2022 - Chickasaw Hall of Fame Inductee - The Chickasaw Nation
- 2022 - Distinguished Alumni Award - The Cleveland Institute of Music
- 2016 - New Music USA Composer-in-Residence with South Dakota Symphony Orchestra.
- 2011 - regional Emmy Award winner for contributions to documentary, The Science of Composing. It was about his residency with the Oklahoma Medical Research Foundation, where he taught composition to seven notable research scientists. Their compositions were performed at the Oklahoma City Museum of Art by members of the Oklahoma City Philharmonic.
- 2011 - nominated for Native Arts and Cultures Foundation Artist Fellowship
- 2008 - appointed Creativity Ambassador for the State of Oklahoma.
- 2006 - Joyce Award to commission Nitoshi’ Imali, Concerto for Guitar and Orchestra
- 2006 - Alumni Achievement Award from the Cleveland Institute of Music.
- Awards from Meet the Composer and the Percussive Arts Society.

== Discography ==
- 2008 – Works by Jerod Impichchaachaaha' Tate. Includes Tracing Mississippi and Iholba'. Performed by Christine Bailey Davis and Thomas Robertello, flutes, with the San Francisco Symphony and San Francisco Symphony Chorus, dir. Edwin Outwater. Cleveland, Ohio: Azica Records.
