= Libby Larsen =

American composer (born 1950)

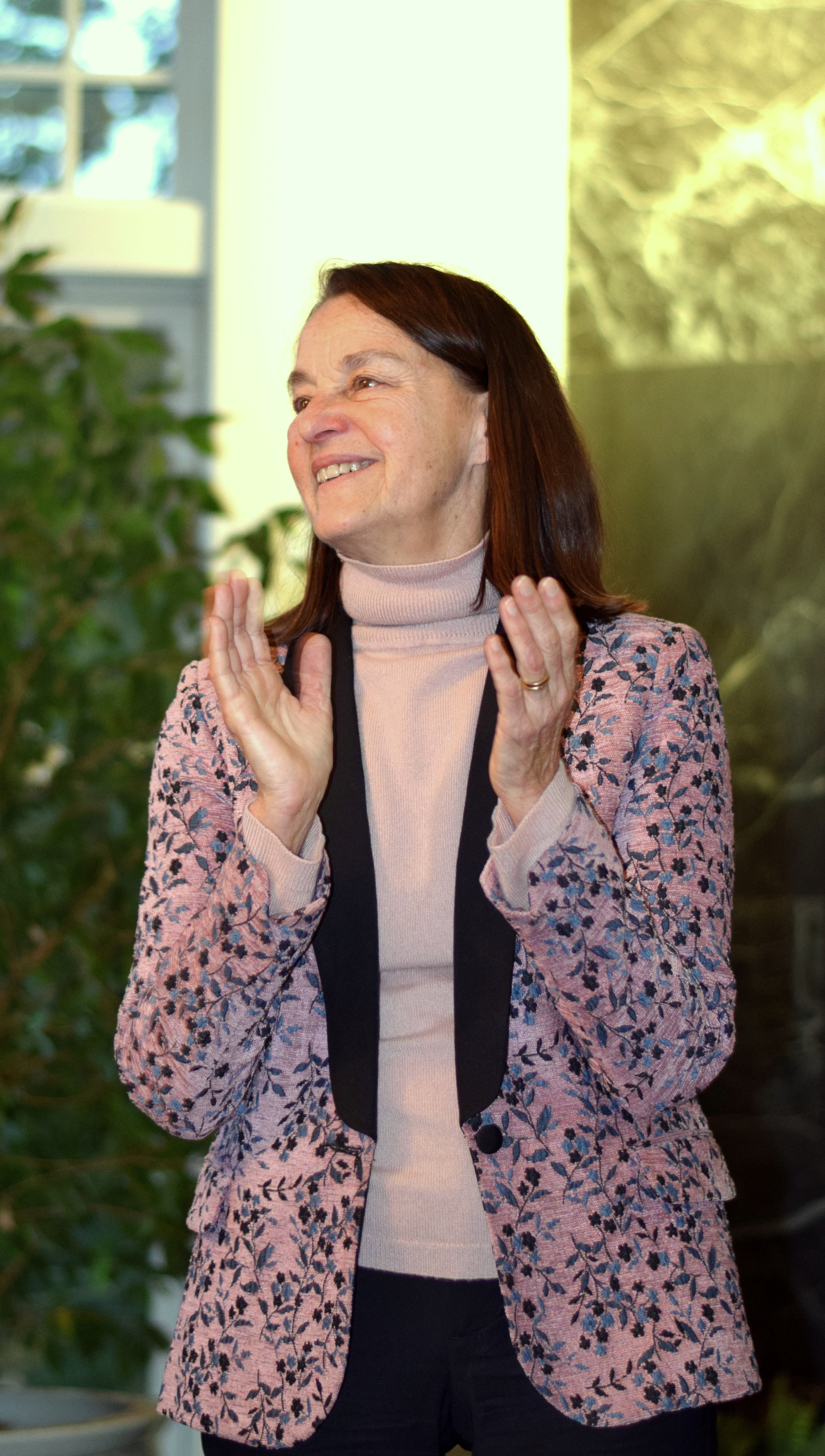
- Larsen in October 2017

Background information
- Born: December 24, 1950 (age 75); Wilmington, Delaware, U.S.
- Occupation: Composer

Elizabeth Brown Larsen (born December 24, 1950) is a contemporary American classical composer. Along with composer Stephen Paulus, she is a co-founder of the Minnesota Composers Forum, now the American Composers Forum.

A former holder of the Papamarkou Chair at John W. Kluge Center of the Library of Congress, Larsen has also held residencies with the Minnesota Orchestra, the Charlotte Symphony Orchestra and the Colorado Symphony Orchestra.

== Biography ==
=== Early life ===
Libby Larsen was born on December 24, 1950, in Wilmington, Delaware, the daughter of Robert Larsen and Alice Brown Larsen. She was the third of five daughters in the family, and at the age of three, Libby and her family moved to Minneapolis, Minnesota.

Her first musical experience dates from the time when she was three years old. She observed her older sister's piano lessons at home; later, she imitated what she had heard. Her formal music education began at the Saint Joseph of Carondelet nuns at Christ the King School. All students sang Gregorian Chant and learned to sight-read using moveable ‘do’ solfege. The rhythmic flexibility and prosody of text Larsen learned in chant showed her that there is freedom in music, a concept that would prove to be very influential in her future compositions. In addition to her classical training, Larsen's father was an amateur clarinetist in a Dixieland band, and her mother played boogie-woogie on the record player, giving her a multifarious and very American musical background.

=== Musical career ===
Larsen attended the University of Minnesota for both her undergraduate and graduate work. She received a Bachelor of Arts degree in Theory and Composition in 1971, a Masters of Arts degree in composition in 1975, and a PhD in Theory and Composition in 1978. Throughout her studies at university, she studied composition with Dominick Argento, Paul Fetler and Eric Stokes. In 1975, Larsen married her husband, James Reece, whom she met at university.

In 1973, Larsen co-founded the Minnesota Composers Forum with colleague Stephen Paulus with the goal to provide a public platform and an audience for the creation and performance of new compositions, along with giving practical help in business matters such as applying for fellowships and negotiating contracts. In 1996, the organization changed its name to the American Composers Forum and established chapters in cities throughout the country including Texas Fort Worth Mesquite, Atlanta, Washington D.C. and Los Angeles, among others. Its base is still in St. Paul, Minnesota.

In 1983, Larsen was appointed one of the Minnesota Orchestra's two composers-in-residence, making her the first woman to serve as a resident composer with a major orchestra. She composed her first symphony, Water Music, for the Minnesota Orchestra, which was premiered in 1985 under Sir Neville Marriner. During her time with the Minnesota Orchestra, Larsen researched reasons for the low attendance of people of her own age at classical concerts and why non-European composers were not adequately represented in concert programs. This led her to studies of classical music in America and its place in American culture, the results of which she has explored in her compositions and other philosophical projects. In 1986, her daughter Wynne was born.

Larsen organized and became artistic director of the Hot Notes Series (sponsored by the Schubert Club of St. Paul) in 1993, which focuses on the modern keyboard, particularly on the interaction between performer and synthesized sound. This interaction has become a feature of her later works, including Frankenstein: The Modern Prometheus (1990) based on the book by Mary Shelley. This work used electronic visual effects such as projectors and screens around the theater which showed different perspectives (e.g. those of the monster or those of Frankenstein himself) throughout the opera. This opera was Larsen's first exploration of technological sound and was selected as one of the eight best classical music events of 1990 by USA Today.

In 1993, she won a Grammy Award for producer of Best Classical Vocal Performance for "The Art of Arlene Augér", featuring her song cycle Sonnets from the Portuguese. In 1996, she received Honorary Doctorates from both St. Mary's College/Notre Dame, and the University of Nebraska.

In addition to being known as a composer, Larsen is known as a musical philosopher and speaker. She has given keynote addresses at places such as the League of American Orchestras, American Choral Directors Association, American Orff-Schulwerk Association National Convention, Concert Band Directors National Association, Dominique de Menil Presidential Lecture Series at Rice University (2001), Music Educators National Convention, and National Association of Schools of Music. From 2003 to 2004, she served as the first Harissios Papamarkou Chair in Education and Technology at the Library of Congress.

In 2010, Larsen received a George Peabody Medal for Outstanding Contributions to Music in America.

Larsen has never held a formal teaching position in college or university, about which she said that she "never felt the need to be attached to an academic institution", as she had been "lucky enough to have the kind of musical life [she] wanted". She has taken independent students, including composer Adam Berndt. Additionally, Larsen's own studies, research, and history have guided her to believe music education needs dramatic changes.

== Influences ==
When asked about her influences, Larsen responded, "To tell the truth, my teachers have come to me from unexpected places in my musical life. They have been poets, architects, painters and philosophers. The other way I really learn is by reading scores voraciously, from Chuck Berry to Witold Lutosławski."

== Style and approach ==
Her style and approach to music comes from her own philosophy on music. Her music comes from the sound she hears everyday around her in the world including nature. It is noted for its "energy, optimism, rhythmic diversity, colourful orchestration, liberated tonality without harsh dissonance, and pervading lyricism."

The rhythms used are often taken directly from the American language: "our own American language has beautiful rhythms in it; it is this American vernacular and the rhythm of our American life that is the language of my music." Pieces such as Holy Roller (about a revivalist preacher's speech) and Bid Call (about auctioneering patterns) showcase this style. Larsen composes without barlines, preferring to first discover the natural flow of a line and then refine it until she finds a common meter, giving many of her compositions a feeling of free internal rhythm.

== Awards ==
- 1987 Distinguished Alumni Award

presented by the University of Minnesota

- 1988 National Opera Association Production Competition Award, “Christina Romana”
- 1989 American Center for International Leadership—US/USSR Emerging Leaders Summit
- 1992 Corporation for Public Broadcasting, Silver Medal
- 1993 Grammy Award

for producer of Best Classical Vocal Performance for “The Art of Arlene Augér” featuring Larsen’s Sonnets from the Portuguese

- 1996 Clarion Award, “The Road to Beijing”
- 1996 Gustavus Adolphus Fine Arts Medal
- 1996 Honorary Doctorate, St. Mary's College/Notre Dame
- 1996 Honorary Doctorate, University of Nebraska
- 2000 Lifetime Achievement Award from the American Academy of Arts and Letters
- 2001 Distinguished Minnesota Award

presented by Bemidji State University

- 2003 Harissios Papmarkou Chair, Library of Congress
- 2004 Eugene McDermott Award in the Arts

presented by the Massachusetts Institute of Technology

- 2007 Inducted into the Minnesota Music Hall of Fame
- 2010 George Peabody Medal
- 2016 McKnight Distinguished Artist Award
- 2020 Inducted into the American Classical Music Hall of Fame
- 2024 American Academy of Arts and Letters Membership
- 2024 Composers Now Visionary Award

== Selected works ==
=== Opera ===
- Clair de Lune (1984)
- Frankenstein: The Modern Prometheus (1990)
- Barnum’s Bird (2000)
- Dreaming Blue (2000)

=== Orchestral ===
- Symphony No. 1 “Water Music” (1985)
- Symphony No. 2 “Coming Forth Into Day” (1986)
- Marimba Concerto: After Hampton (1992)
- Ring of Fire (1995)
- Song-Dances to the Light (1995)
- Symphony No. 5: “Solo Symphony” (1999)
- “Still Life with Violin” (2000)
- “Evening in the Palace of Reason” (2008)

=== Band ===
- Strut (2003)
- An Introduction to the Moon (2005)

=== Choral ===
- ”Who Cannot Weep Come Learn of Me” (1985)
- Songs of Youth and Pleasure (1986)
- The Settling Years (1988)
- "I Just Lightning" (1994)
- Seven Ghosts (1995)
- Today This Spring (1995)
- "By a Departing Light" (1999)
- Love Songs: Five Songs on Texts by Women Poets (1999)
- Four Valentines: A Lover’s Journey (2000)
- "Jack’s Valentine" (2001)
- "Womanly Song of God" (2003)
- Western Songs (2005)

=== Vocal ===
- Songs From Letters (1989)
- Sonnets From the Portuguese (1991)
- Love After 1950 (2000)
- Try Me, Good King: Last Words of the Wives of Henry VIII (2000)
- This Unbearable Stillness: Songs from the Balcony (2003)
- Sifting Through the Ruins (2005)

=== Instrumental ===
- “Four on the Floor” (1984)
- “Dancing Solo” (1994)
- “Slang” (1994)
- Concert Piece for Tuba and Piano (1995)
- “Holy Roller” (1997)
- “Barn Dances” (2001)
- “Bid Call” (2002)
- "Yellow Jersey" (2004)
- “Song Concerto” (2005)
- "Concert Piece for Bassoon and Piano" (2008)

=== Multimedia ===
- Matineé: The Fantom of the Fair (2014)

=== Carillon ===
- Pealing Fire (2004)

== Featured discography ==
- Dreaming Blue

An opera by Libby Larsen, the story of a child brought by a family into a new culture. Appleton Boychoir; Attic Theater, Inc.; Children’s Ballet Theatre; Fox Cities Performing Arts Center; Fox Valley Symphony Orchestra; Lawrence Academy of Music Girl Choir; University Drumming Group; White Heron Chorale; Brian Groner, conductor

- I Just Lightning

Las Cantantes, The University of New Mexico Women’s Chorus; Bradley Ellingboe, conductor

- Licorice Stick

Katarina Strom-Harg, piano; Stfan Harg, clarinet; Kathleen Roland, soprano; Asa Johannon, violin

- Libby Larsen: Symphony no. 4 for Strings; Songs of Light and Love; Songs from Letters

Benita Valenta, soprano; Scottish Chamber Orchestra; Joel Revzen, conductor

- Libby Larsen: Deep Summer Music; Concerto for Marimba: “After Hampton”, Symphony no. 5: “Solo Symphony”

John Kinzie, marimba; Colorado Symphony Orchestra; Marin Alsop, conductor

- The Art of Arleen Augér

Featuring Larsen’s Sonnets from the Portuguese, also includes music of Wolfgang Amadeus Mozart, Henry Purcell, and Robert Schumann.
Arleen Augér, soprano; Minnesota Orchestra, Members of the Saint Paul Chamber Orchestra; Joel Revzen, conductor.
1993 Grammy Award for Best Classical Vocal Performance

- Missa Gaia “Mass for the Earth”

Koch International Classics. Also includes music of Stephen Paulus and Samuel Barber.
Oregon Repertory Singers; Gilbert Seeley, conductor

- Grand Larsen-y: Vocal Music of Libby Larsen

Albany Records
Benton Hess, piano; Terry Rhodes, soprano

- The Eternal Feminine

Koch International Classics.
Featuring Larsen’s Love After 1950, also includes music of Lisbeth Alexander-Katz, Amy Beach, Lili Boulanger, Rebecca Clarke, Alma Mahler, Clara Wieck Schumann, Elinor Remick Warren
Susanne Mentzer, mezzo-soprano; Craig Rutenberg, piano

- Journeys: Orchestral Works by American Women

Leonarda Productions, LE327, 1985.
Featuring Larsen’s Overture--Parachute Dancing 1984, also includes music of Nancy Van De Vate, Kay Gardner, Marga Richter, Katherine Hoover, Ursula Mamlok, Jane Brockman.
Bournemouth Sinfonietta, Arioso Chamber Orchestra, Carolann Martin: Conductor
