= Svjetlana Bukvich =

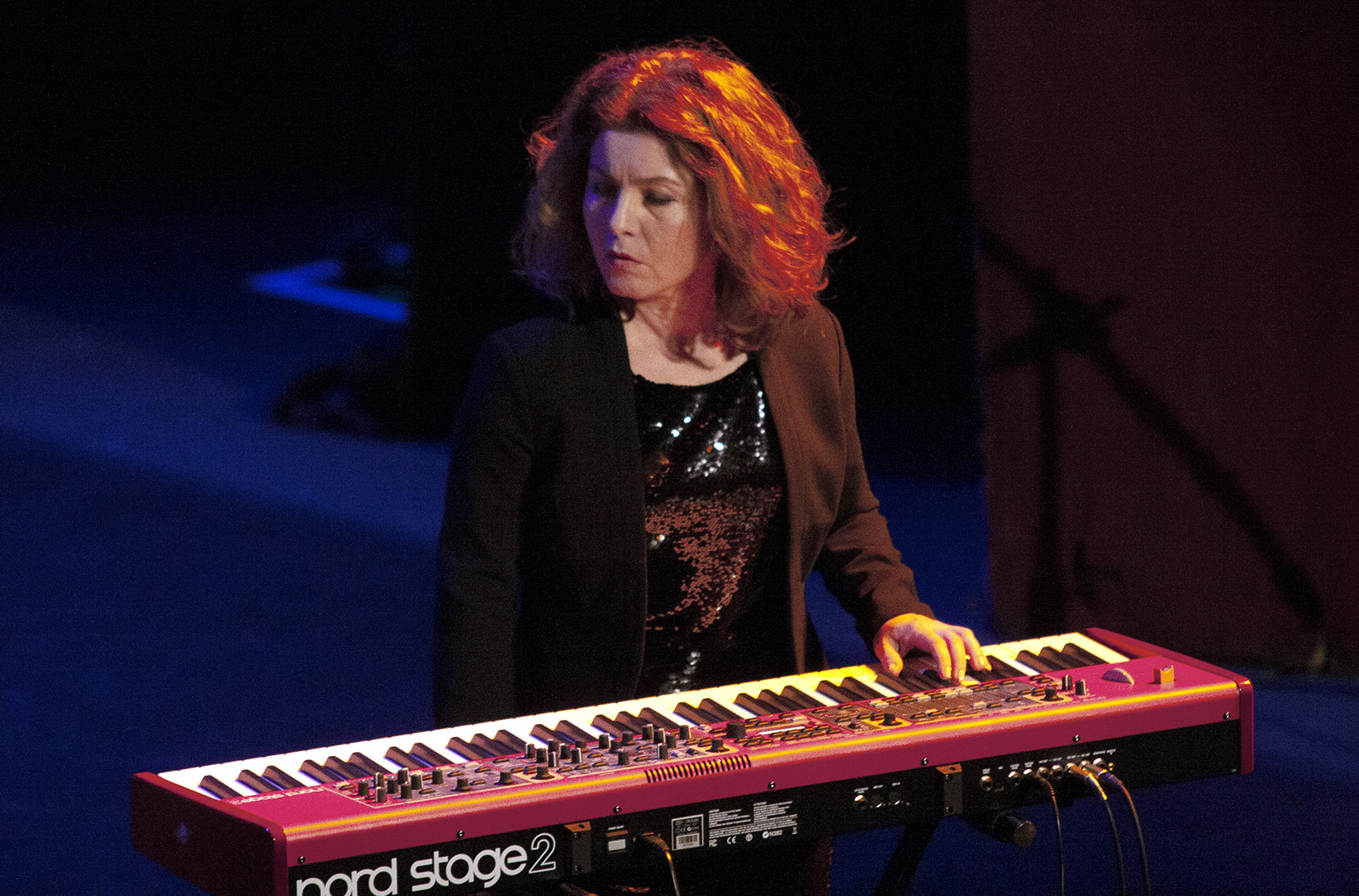
- Bukvich in 2015

Background information
- Born: Sarajevo, Yugoslavia (today Bosnia and Herzegovina)
- Genres: Classical; electronic music
- Occupations: Composer; music producer; media performance artist; pianist; music educator
- Instruments: piano; analog and digital synthesizers; voice
- Labels: Navona; Big Round Records; Innova; Albany Records
- Website: svjetlanamusic.com

Svjetlana Bukvich is an American/Bosnian-Herzegovinian music composer, music producer, and media performance artist best known for her blending of classical music, media and electronic music. She has received numerous awards and her works have been featured at the Metropolitan Museum of Art, the Kennedy Center, and by the Sarajevo Philharmonic Orchestra, among others.

== Career ==
Svjetlana Bukvich's music has been described as acoustic and performer-driven to electronic and theatrical, and often includes visual arts and microtonality, with tunings of her own design. She is one the few female composers from Bosnia and Herzegovina working and performing in the U.S. and incorporates musical and cultural influences of both. She has received awards from the American Composers Forum, New England Foundation for the Arts, and the Institute On The Arts and Civic Dialogue at Harvard University, and others. Bukvich was recognized by the New York Foundation for the Arts (NYFA) with a Fellowship in Music/Sound in 2013.

Bukvich performed her breakthrough piece Before and After the Tekke for electronics, keyboard, voice, and amplified violin at the Congress of the International Alliance for Women in Music in Beijing in 2008. That same year the piece was awarded First prize in the International Chamber Music Festival in Sarajevo. She has presented her productions internationally, and in 2019 she held two concerts in Sarajevo in collaboration with the Sarajevo Music Academy, the Sarajevo Philharmonic Orchestra and the Bosnian-Herzegovinian American Academy of Arts and Sciences (BHAAAS). In 2020 her work was featured at the Metropolitan Museum of Art with the Ethel (string quartet) as part of Balcony Bar From Home - Ethel and Friends. Her compositions and albums have received favorable reviews in the press.

"Wherever we approach the music of this disc we will find that Miss Bukvich is a composer who is a true musical Epicurean, but whose sound of music is not only prolonged in the sensualist realm but also arouses in us a feeling of hope that is quite palpable" - Raul da Gama, World Music Report.

"Bukvich is one of the notable musicians who have embraced the energetic complexity of prog-rock via contemporary composition. Her trademarks are sonority, color, texture, and a feeling for the metaphysical, and her collaboration with Carolyn Dorfman has earned raves" - The Brooklyn Rail.

In 2025, Bukvich's composition, Unraveling the Linear, was featured on Sylvan Winds' 2025 album, Resonant Worlds, released on Albany Records. Gramophone magazine wrote, "Unraveling the Linear could be the score for a quantum mechanics mystery, with its kinetic energy, contrasting moods and carefully etched backgrounds energized by an electronic tape.

- Writing

Bukvich contributed one chapter, Women in Audio: Trends in New York Through the Perspective of a Civil War Survivor, to the book Gender in Music Production, released in 2020 and is a contributor in Modern Diplomacy, reviewing music.

== Discography ==
- 2014 - EVOLUTION
- 2015 - Big Round Sound, VOL I
- 2015 - THE NYFA COLLECTION, VOL II
- 2020 - EXTENSION
- 2025 - Resonant Worlds

== Education ==
Svjetlana holds a B.A. in musical composition, a B.A. in musicology from Sarajevo University's Academy of Music and an M.F.A. in integrated electronic arts from Rensselaer Polytechnic Institute in New York. She taught music technology at New York University, Pratt Institute, and is an associate professor at City University of New York. She is also faculty at the Microtonal University (MU) and is on the board of directors at the American Festival of Microtonal Music (AFMM).
