= Dojo (instrument) =

String instrument
- Classification: string
- Hornbostel–Sachs classification: 321.322 (Necked box lutes)

Related instruments
- Dobro-guitar, Banjo

The dojo is a hybrid instrument designed as a cross between the Dobro-style guitar and the bluegrass banjo. The body and resonator are like the Dobro, while it is strung like a five-string banjo. The tunings and fingerings are also just like a banjo. The intention in creating the dojo was to give banjoists the opportunity to get a completely different sound without having to learn fingerings for an entirely new instrument. Dojos have a much more mellow sound than a banjo, and plucked notes are sustained longer due to the resonator.
