= Velour Recordings =

American record label

- Founded: 1999
- Genre: Various
- Country of origin: U.S.
- Official website: http://www.velourmusic.com

Velour Recordings is an American record label founded in 1999 in New York City by Jeff Krasno and Sean Hoess.

== Signed artists include ==
- The Cat Empire
- Soulive
- Kaki King
- Melissa Errico
- Maktub
- Topaz
- Lettuce
- Kudu
- Baba
- Sonya Kitchell
- Rustic Overtones
- Beowulf Sheehan
- Brendan James
- Jesse Harris
- Krystle Warren
- Rufus Cappadocia
- Ryan Scott

== See also ==
- List of record labels
