= Former First Congregational Church (Wells, Maine) =

Historic church in Maine, United States

- First Congregational Church, Former
- U.S. National Register of Historic Places
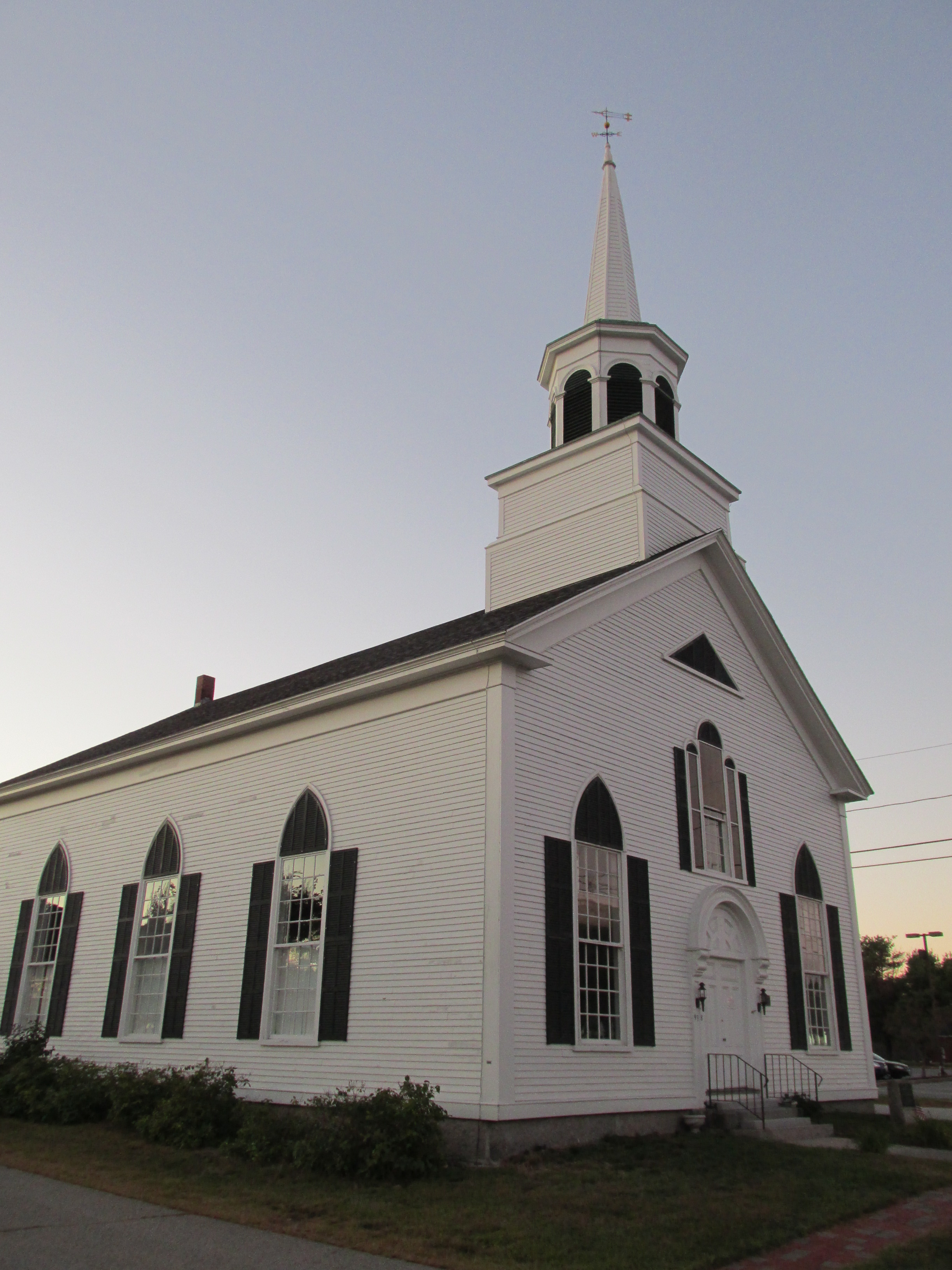
- Historical Society of Wells and Ogunquit

- Location within Maine Location within the United States
- Location: 938 Post Rd.; SW corner of Rt. 1 and Buzzell Rd., Wells, Maine
- Coordinates: 43°18′5″N 70°35′12″W
- Area: less than one acre
- Built: 1862
- Architect: Robinson & Huzzey
- Architectural style: Romanesque, Gothic Revival
- NRHP reference No.: 91000768
- Added to NRHP: June 21, 1991

The Former First Congregational Church is a historic church building at 938 Post Road, on the corner of Rt. 1 and Buzzell Road in Wells, Maine. It was built in 1862 on the site of the first colonial meeting house in Wells, believed to have been built in 1664. The building is a fine example of Romanesque and Gothic architecture. It now serves as the museum of the Historical Society of Wells and Ogunquit. The building was listed on the National Register of Historic Places in 1991.

== Description and history ==
The former First Congregational Church is located on United States Route 1 in central Wells, a short way north of the Webhannet River. The area is now commercially developed; the building stands at the southwestern corner of Route 1 and Buzzell Road, facing east. It is a single-story wood-frame structure, with a front-facing gable roof and clapboard siding. The front facade is symmetrically arranged, with sash windows topped by Gothic arched louvered panels on the outer bays, and the entrance at the center, set under a round arch supported by pilasters. Above the entrance is a three-part window with narrow sidelights, with Gothic-arch louvers above. A tower rises above the main ridge, with square stages supporting an open octagonal belfry with round-arch openings. The tower is topped by a steeple and weathervane.

The entrance leads into a vestibule area, which is separated from the main hall by two entrances, with an enclosed winding stair leading to a gallery above. The interior doorways are highlighted by gabled pediments. The gallery, unlike many churches of the period in Maine, is cantilevered over part of the nave area, supported by large brackets. The ceiling is pressed metal.

The church was built in 1862, and is the third meetinghouse to stand on the site; the first is believed to have been erected in 1664, and the second in 1699, after the first was burned in a Native American raid. The church saw active use until the 1960s, and was given to the local historical society in 1967. Its vestry space is used as a library and museum, while the hall is used as a community performance space.

== See also ==
- National Register of Historic Places listings in York County, Maine
