= Timber Point =

Historic house in Maine, United States

- U.S. National Register of Historic Places
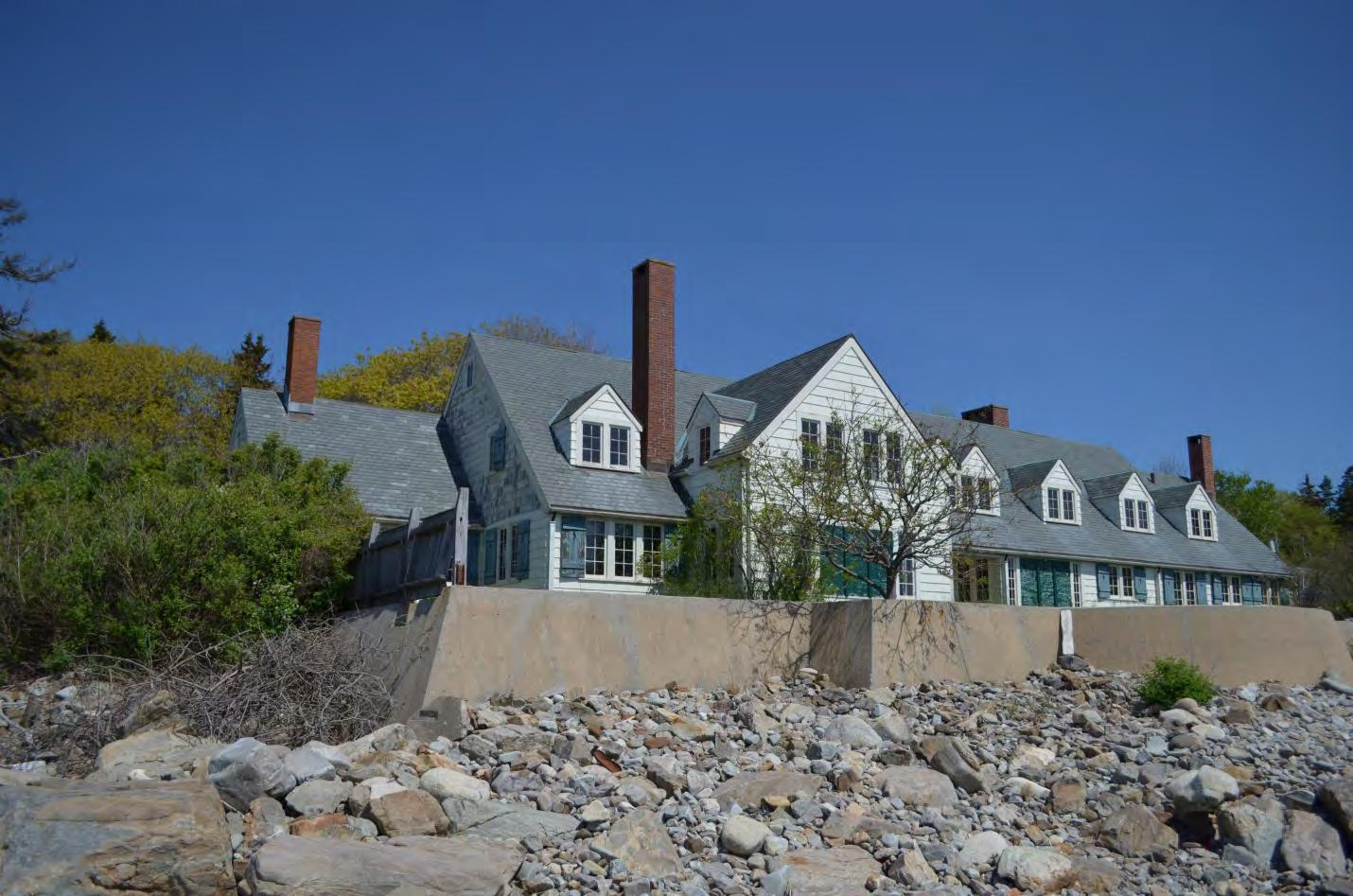

- Location within Maine Location within the United States
- Location: 2 Timber Point Rd., Rachel Carson National Wildlife Refuge, Biddeford, Maine
- Coordinates: 43°23′56″N 70°23′51″W
- Area: 86 acres (35 ha)
- Built: 1931
- Architectural style: Arts and Crafts
- NRHP reference No.: 16000786
- Added to NRHP: November 15, 2016

Timber Point is a historic summer estate in Biddeford Pool, Maine. Located at the city's southernmost tip, and now part of the Rachel Carson National Wildlife Refuge, the property was developed in the 1930s by architect Charles Ewing for his family. It was listed on the National Register of Historic Places in 2016.

== Description and history ==
Timber Point occupies a mostly wooded promontory at the very southernmost tip of Biddeford, across the Little River from the Goose Neck section of Kennebunkport. The estate property, totalling nearly 86 acres (35 ha), also includes Timber Island, a tidal island, just south of the promontory. It is accessed via Granite Point Road, which passes through the Biddeford unit of the Rachel Carson National Wildlife Refuge, which now includes the Timber Point property. The built elements of the estate include its main house, garage, boathouse and bathhouse, and a number of other outbuildings. The main house is a 1 1/2-story Colonial Revival wood-frame structure, which presents a broad facade to the southern vista of the promontory, and a projecting gabled entry section to the north. The interior is composed of a series of rooms. The "public" rooms interconnect without hallways.

The property was purchased in 1929 by Louise Parsons Ewing, and was at the time a combination of woods and farmland. Her husband Charles was an architect active in New York City and Maine. He designed the main house and other aspects of the estate, and the couple entertained friends and family there, notably including the artist Rockwell Kent and writers Booth Tarkington and Kenneth Roberts. In 2012 their heirs sold the property to the United States Fish and Wildlife Service.

A trail on the property was listed as a National Recreation Trail in 2013.

== See also ==
- National Register of Historic Places listings in York County, Maine
