= Moody Beach, Maine =

- Area within New England town
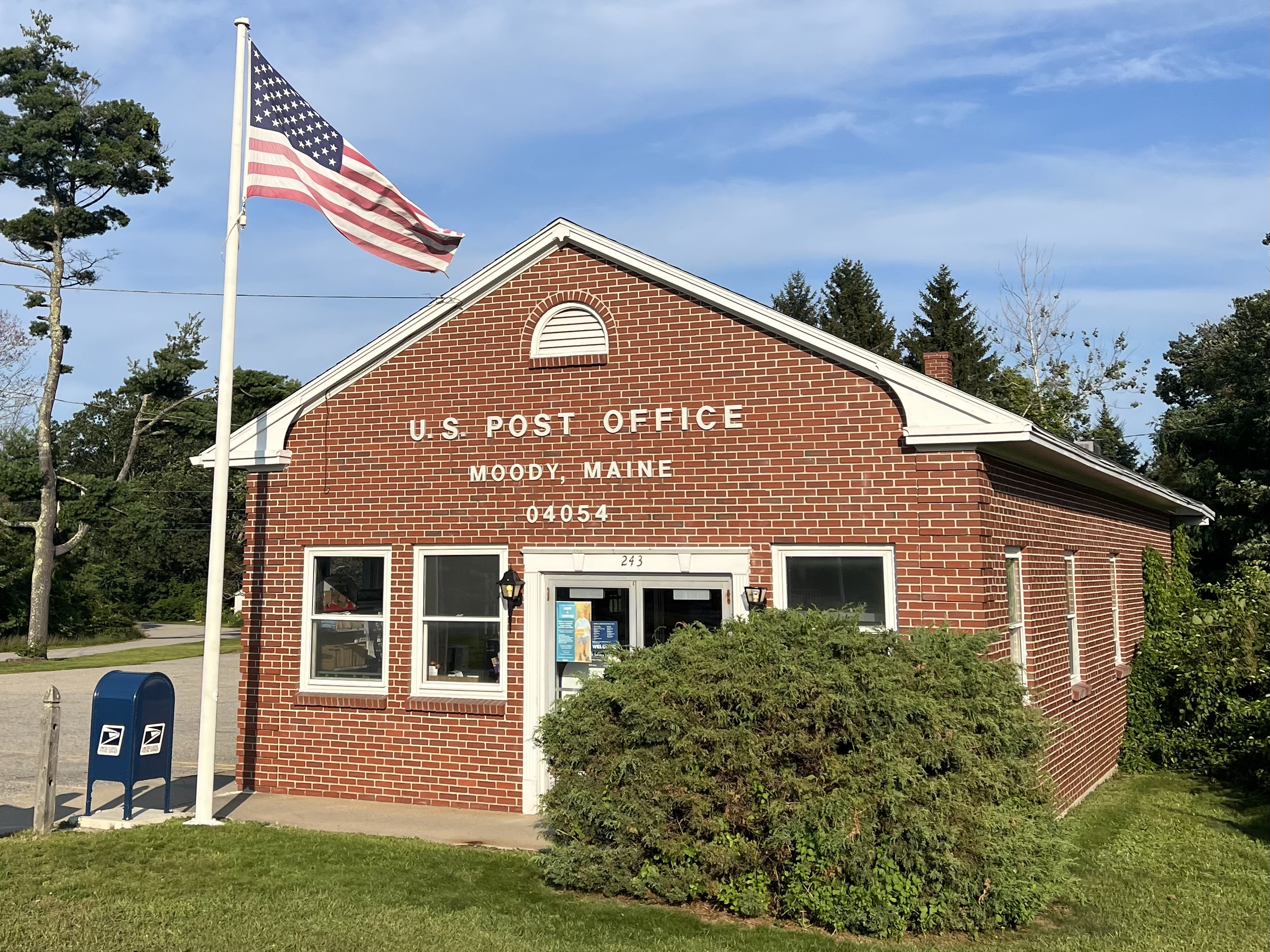
- Moody U.S. Post Office

- Location within the state of Maine
- Coordinates: 43°16′30.31″N 70°35′49.19″W
- Country: United States
- State: Maine
- County: York
- Elevation: 46 ft (14 m)
- Time zone: UTC-5 (Eastern (EST))
  - Summer (DST): UTC-4 (EDT)
- ZIP code: 04054

Moody Beach is a coastal neighborhood and private beach located in Wells, Maine, with about 100 homes adjoining the beach. Moody Beach has a blend of year-round and summer residents, as well as short-term vacationers from around New England and Quebec. The coastline stretches about a mile long, from Ogunquit Beach to Moody Point on Ocean Avenue.

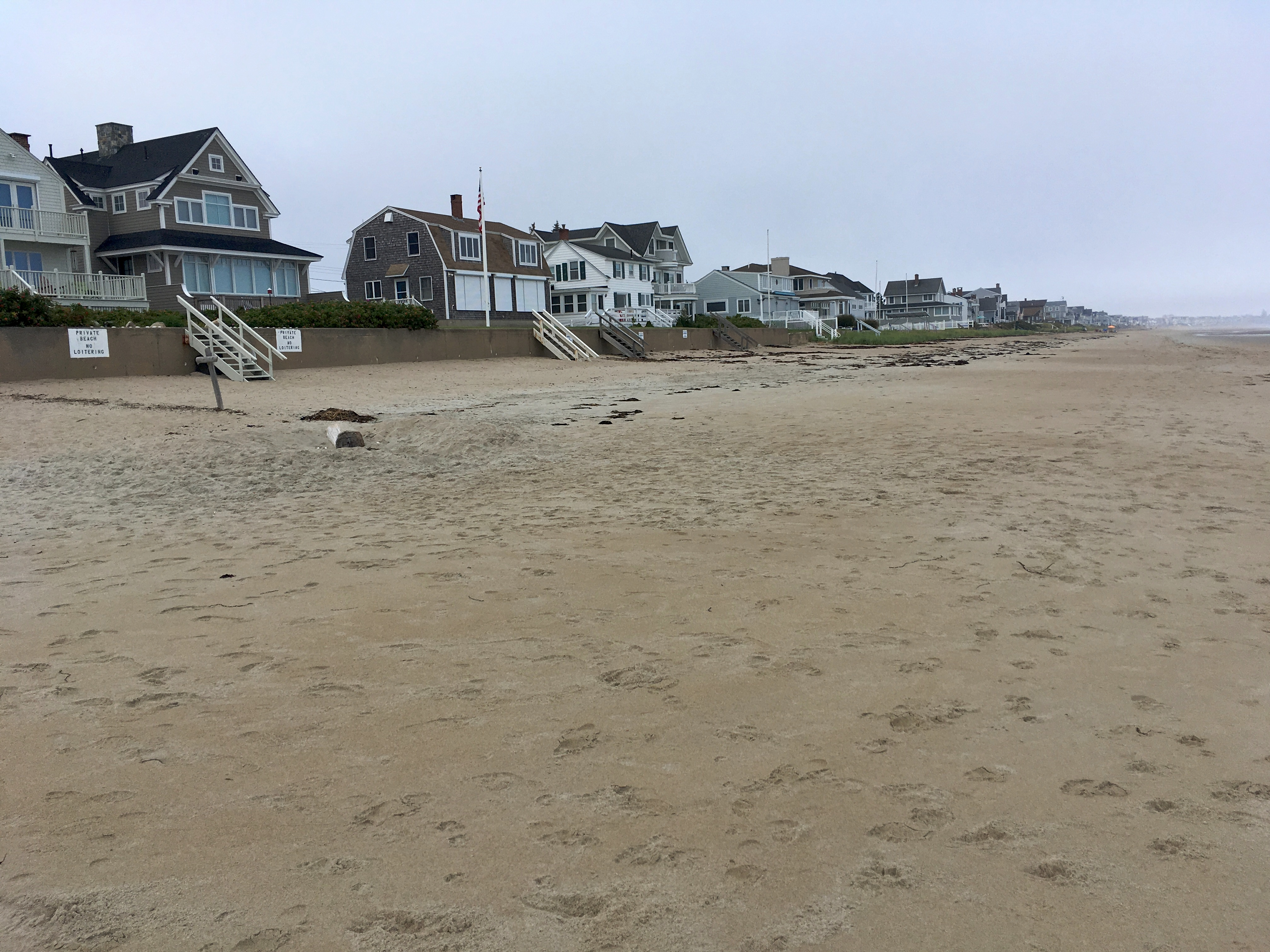

The area was named in honor of George H. Moody, proprietor of the former landmark corner store on Post Road and Kimball Lane. Moody's post office operated from this location as well, until it was replaced by the current building in 1975. The original structure still stands and is now home to the Wells Chamber of Commerce.

Moody Beach is central in the debate over public access versus private rights to the Maine shore. In March 1989, the Maine Supreme Judicial Court sided with homeowners in Bell v. Town of Wells, also known as the Moody Beach case. The court affirmed that, in Maine, owners of beachfront property or property adjoining tidelands have private property rights to the low-water mark or low tide area, subject only to a public easement for “fishing, fowling, and navigation.” The case is often cited as authority for the notion that the public has only very limited rights in intertidal zone (the area between high and low tide).

== Images ==
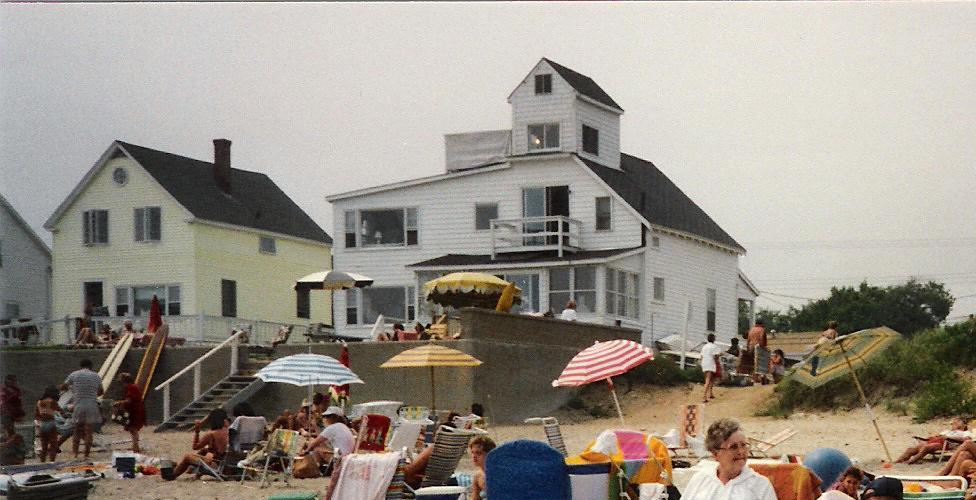
Withrows on the Beach guest house in 1988

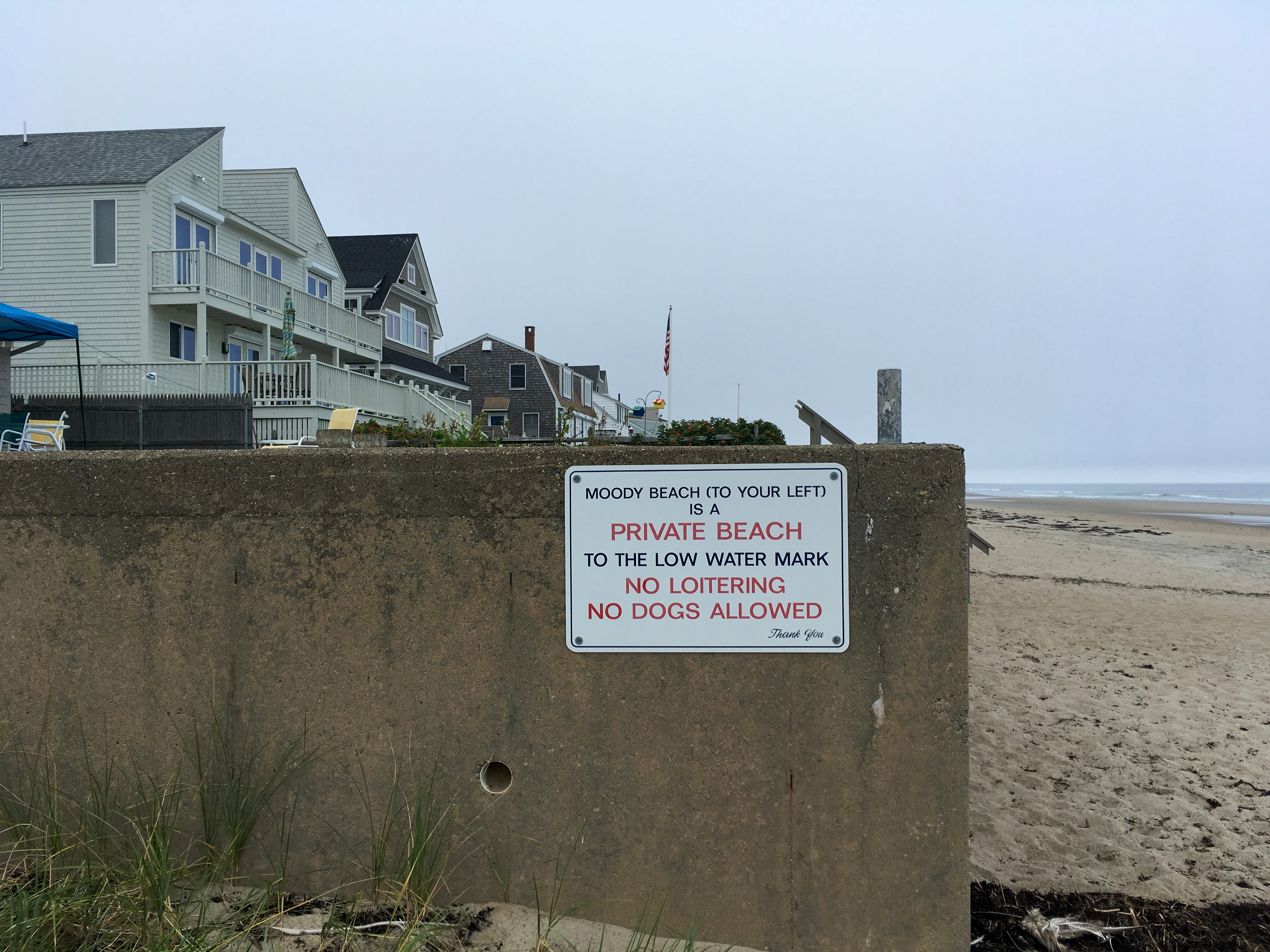
Southern boundary of Moody Beach at Ogunquit Beach
