= Ogunquit Village School =

Coordinates: 43.24661°N 70.59894°W

Ogunquit Village School was a school in Ogunquit, Maine. It closed in 2004 after the Wells-Ogunquit Community School District and the Maine Department of Education determined that necessary building repairs would cost more than the building was worth. Safety concerns also contributed to the decision to close the school; shortly after closing, the building was condemned by the state fire marshall.

== Pre-1907 ==
Before 1907 there was a one-room school on the lot where the school sits now. It served as the school for the village of Ogunquit until 1907 when the new school was built.

== 1907 ==
The present-day school was built in 1907. The old one-room school was raised and made into the front corner of the second floor. The building was painted white, and later painted red.
