= Wells-Ogunquit Community School District =

School district in Maine, United States

Wells-Ogunquit Community School District (CSD 18)
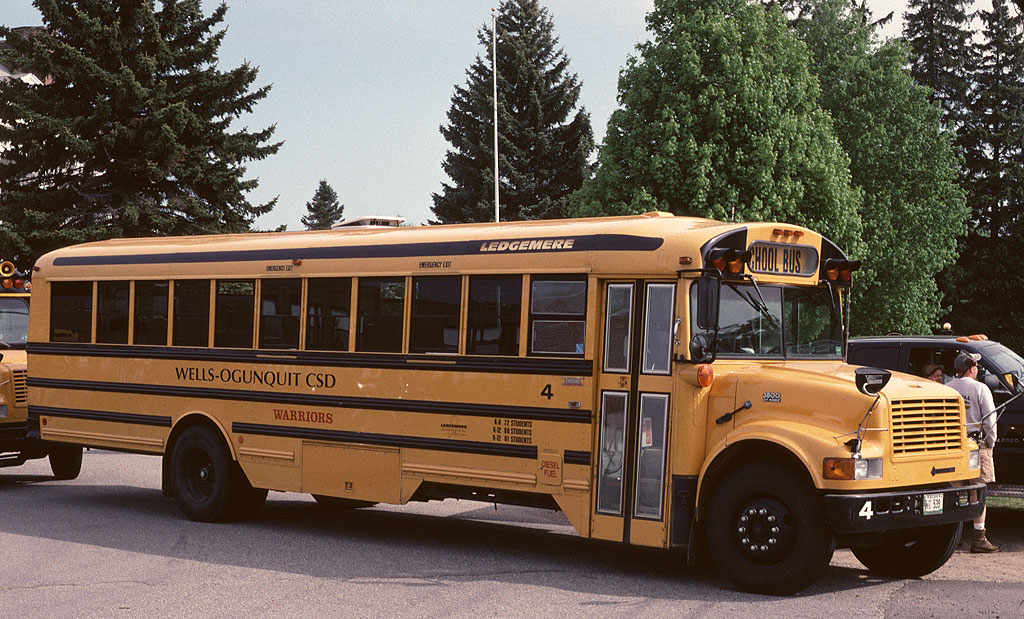
- A Wells-Ogunquit CSD school bus

Address
- 1460 Post Road Wells, Maine, 04090; United States
- Coordinates: 43°19′08″N 70°34′58″W

District information
- Type: Public
- Motto: Ensuring Continuous Improvement for Each Learner
- Grades: K through 12 and Adult
- Established: 1980; 46 years ago
- Superintendent: James P. Daly
- Budget: $21,333,394 (2012-2013)
- NCES District ID: 2313490

Students and staff
- Enrollment: 1,359 (K-12, 2011–2012)
- Staff: 114.90 (on an FTE basis)
- Student–teacher ratio: 11.70

Other information
- Website: www.k12wocsd.net

The Wells-Ogunquit Community School District (Wells-Ogunquit CSD or CSD 18) provides education for students of all ages in the coastal southern Maine towns of Wells and Ogunquit.

== History ==
The district was created by the Maine Legislature in 1980 when Ogunquit was incorporated as a town. (Prior to that, Ogunquit had been a village within the town of Wells.)

Throughout 2008 and 2009, in an effort to comply with the state's 2008 school consolidation law, the district attempted to find another district to merge with, in order to form a Regional school unit. Wells-Ogunquit explored merging with MSAD 71 (Kennebunk-Kennebunkport), as well as the York and Kittery school departments, but was unable to reach an agreement with any of them. Wells-Ogunquit submitted a waiver application to the state, which was rejected. The state then recommended that Wells-Ogunquit merge with the Acton School Department, despite the substantial geographic distance between Acton and the Wells-Ogunquit area. Under the pressure of a deadline from the state, the towns of Acton, Ogunquit, and Wells held referendums to determine whether voters would approve or deny the consolidation. Voters in all three towns rejected the plan. Under the consolidation law, Wells-Ogunquit is therefore allowed to remain a "stand-alone" district with no penalty.

== Governance ==
The district is governed by a school committee, which consists of six elected at-large members: three from Ogunquit and three from Wells. Committee members serve for three-year terms. The votes of Wells committee members are weighted more heavily than the votes of Ogunquit committee members, in order to reflect the population difference between the two towns.

== Schools and programs ==
=== Current ===
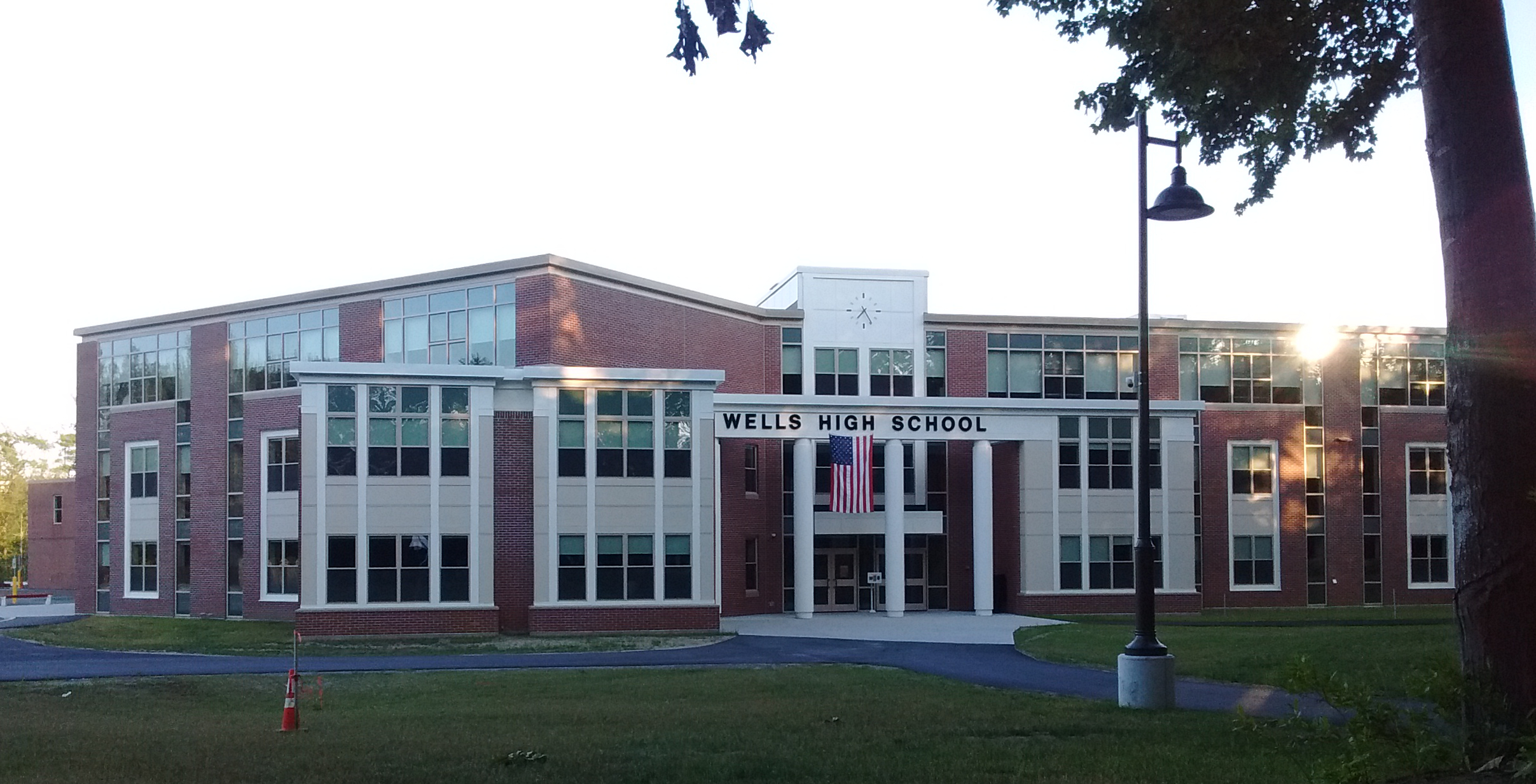
Wells High School

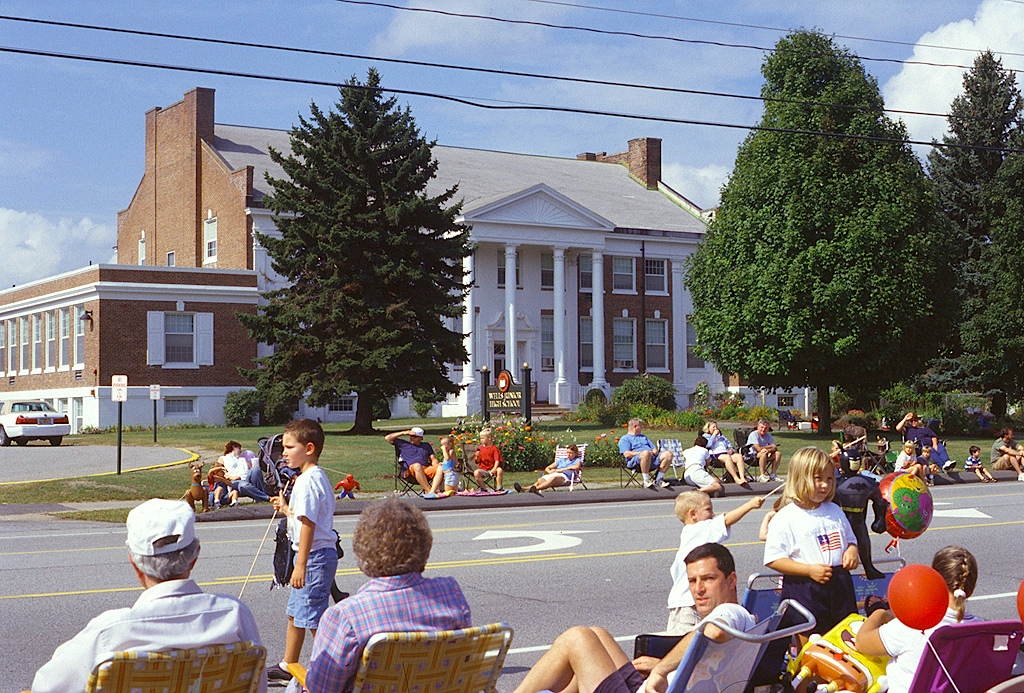
Wells Junior High School

- Wells Elementary School provides classes for students in kindergarten through fourth grade. 2011–2012 enrollment: 478 students.
- Wells Junior High School provides classes for students in fifth grade through eighth grade. 2011–2012 enrollment: 449 students.
- Wells High School provides classes for students in ninth grade through twelfth grade. 2011–2012 enrollment: 432 students.
  - Wells-Ogunquit Adult Community Education, located on the premises of Wells High School, provides adult education classes for adults of all ages.

=== Closed ===
- Ogunquit Village School provided classes for Ogunquit students in kindergarten through fifth grade. In 2004 it was closed due to declining enrollment and high maintenance costs, and Ogunquit's elementary students were transferred to Wells Elementary School.

== See also ==
- List of school districts in Maine
