= Nate Dingle =

American football player (born 1971)

No. 58, 55, 53
- Position: Linebacker

Personal information
- Born: July 23, 1971 (age 55); Machias, Maine, U.S.
- Listed height: 6 ft 2 in (1.88 m)
- Listed weight: 252 lb (114 kg)

Career information
- High school: Wells (Wells, Maine)
- College: Cincinnati
- NFL draft: 1994: undrafted

Career history
- Washington Redskins (1994)*; Frankfurt Galaxy (1995); San Diego Chargers (1995)*; Philadelphia Eagles (1995); Kansas City Chiefs (1996)*; Jacksonville Jaguars (1996); St. Louis Rams (1997)
- * Offseason or practice squad member only

Career NFL statistics
- Tackles: 1
- Stats at Pro Football Reference

Nathan Hunter Dingle (born July 23, 1971) is an American former professional football player who was a linebacker for three years in the National Football League (NFL). Dingle played for the Philadelphia Eagles, Jacksonville Jaguars and St. Louis Rams, appearing in a total of 17 games.
