= Wells, Maine =

Town in Maine, United States

- Town
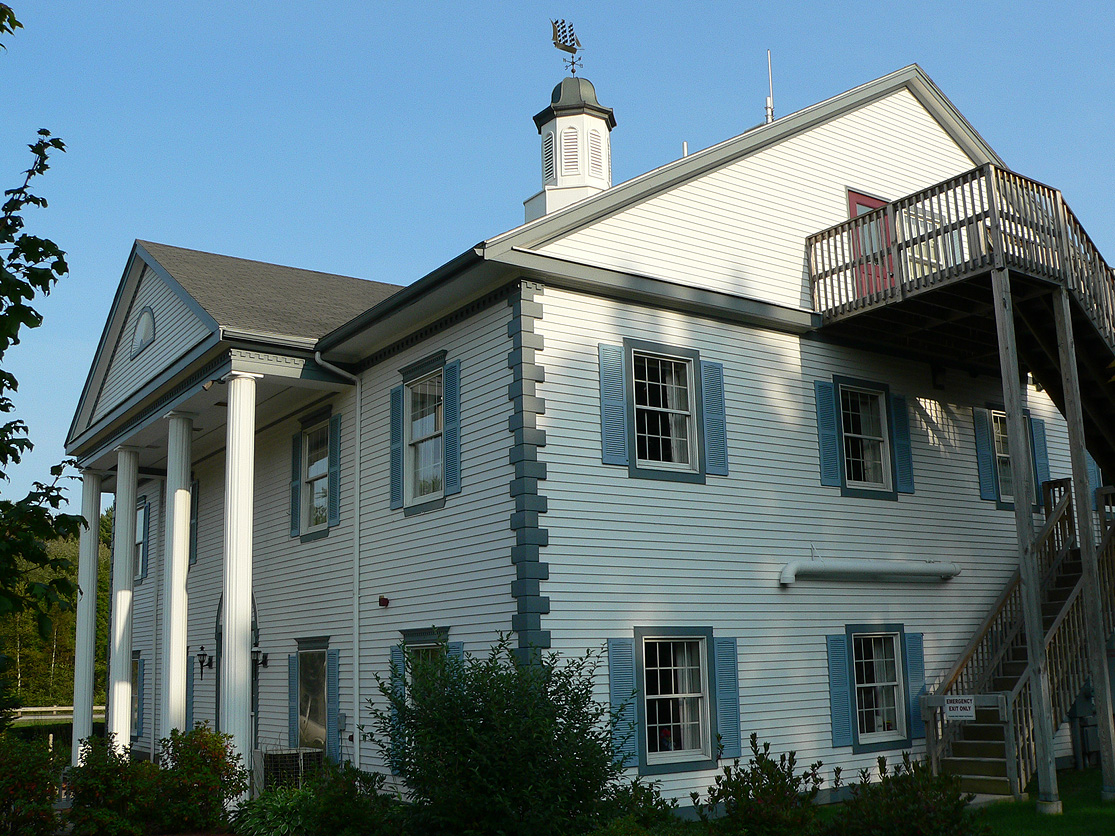
- Town Hall

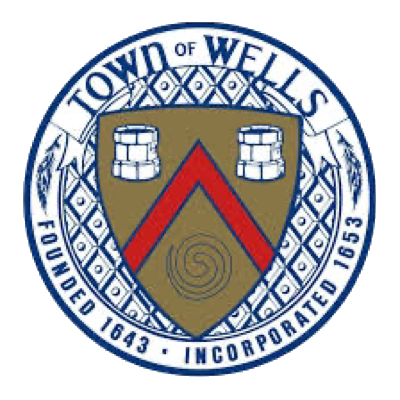
- Flag Seal
- Motto: The Friendliest Town in Maine
- Location within Maine Location within the United States
- Coordinates: 43°19′53″N 70°36′48″W
- Country: United States
- State: Maine
- County: York
- Founded: 1643
- Incorporated: 1653

Government
  - Type: Board of Selectmen, Town Manager

Area
  - Total: 73.61 sq mi (190.6 km^{2})
  - Land: 57.55 sq mi (149.1 km^{2})
  - Water: 16.06 sq mi (41.6 km^{2})
- Elevation: 141 ft (43 m)

Population (2020)
  - Total: 11,314
  - Density: 196.6/sq mi (75.91/km^{2})
- Time zone: UTC−05:00 (EST)
  - Summer (DST): UTC−04:00 (EDT)
- ZIP Codes: 04054 (Moody); 04090 (Wells)
- Area code: 207
- FIPS code: 23-81475
- GNIS feature ID: 582799
- Website: www.wellstown.org

Wells is a town in York County, Maine, United States. Founded in 1643, it is the third-oldest town in Maine. The population was 11,314 at the 2020 census. Wells Beach is a popular summer destination.

== History ==
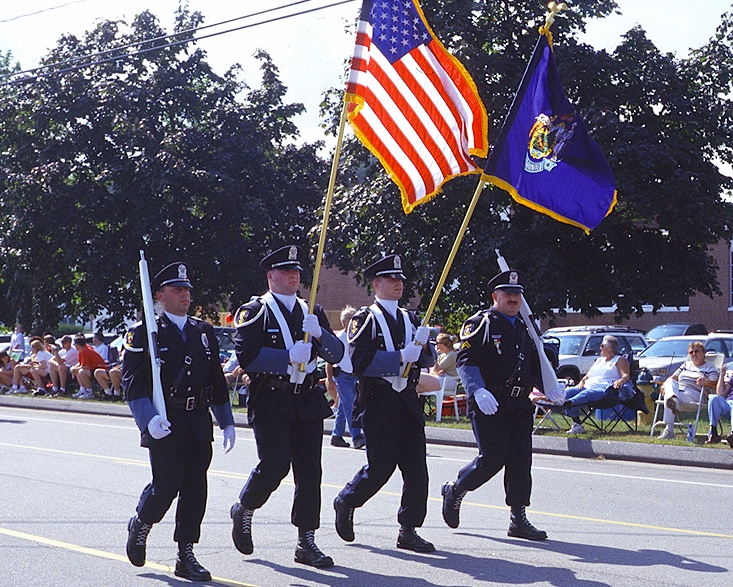
Wells Police Department color guard marching in the town's 350th anniversary parade.

Edmund Littlefield, an immigrant from the wool regions of Titchfield, England, built the first gristmill and later a woolen mill on the Webhannet River, becoming known as "The Father of Wells," where a monument commemorates his contribution. In 1622, the Plymouth Company in England awarded to Sir Ferdinando Gorges, Lord Proprietor of Maine, territory which included the Plantation of Wells. His young cousin, Thomas Gorges, acting as deputy and agent, in 1641 granted to Rev. John Wheelwright and other settlers from Exeter, New Hampshire the right to populate the land from northeast of the Ogunquit River to southwest of the Kennebunk River. Following the death of the elder Gorges in 1647, the Massachusetts Bay Colony laid claim to Maine. On July 5, 1653, Wells was incorporated, the third town in Maine to do so, and named after Wells, England, a small cathedral city in the county of Somerset.

After the restoration of Charles II and a petition from local Anglican residents, a meeting in Wells of the trustees of the late Ferdinando Gorges occurred in which the British authorities gave a general outline for a local civil and military administration outside of Massachusetts jurisdiction on December 7, 1661. Massachusetts rule over Wells was restored in 1668.

Wells included Kennebunk, which was set off the year Maine became a state in 1820, and Ogunquit, designated a village within Wells by the legislature in 1913, then set off in 1980.

Wells was the resilient northeastern frontier of English colonial settlement. Except for a few forts and garrisons, early attempts to colonize Maine above Wells were abandoned because of attacks by Native Americans, who resented the encroachment on their territory. Wells endured three major attacks, most famously the Raid on Wells in 1692. The region became less dangerous, however, after the Battle of Louisburg in 1745.

Many early Wells settlers joined the Continental Army; some became Revolutionary War heroes, including Captains Samuel Gooch, Nathanial Littlefield, and Jeremiah Storer. Ocean View Cemetery on Post Road contains a Civil War monument and plot honoring its service members. Visitors can walk to Founder's Park just off of Post Road onto Sanford Road, which includes a light walking trail, picnic area, and the first settlement home. Monuments list the names of Wells' founding families.

The town developed as a farming community, producing hay and vegetables. Other industries included shipbuilding and fisheries. In the 19th century, with the arrival of the railroad, the town's sandy beaches attracted tourists. Many inns and hotels were built along the seashore. Today, tourism remains important to the economy.

Wells celebrated its 350th anniversary in 2003. The year-long celebration included a New Year's Eve party with fireworks, parade, a visit by the traveling Russian circus, concerts, historical reenactments, and more. The town commissioned a member of the celebration committee, Kristi Borst, to design a town flag. Her design portrays historic aspects of the Town's settlement and agriculture as well as the 2003 Town Hall and focus on tourism represented by a train. Also included is the motto she penned for the project: "Proud of our Past, Ready for our Future".

== Geography ==
Wells is on the southern coast of Maine, surrounded by Kennebunk to the northeast, Sanford to the northwest, North Berwick to the west, South Berwick and York to the southwest, and Ogunquit to the south.

According to the United States Census Bureau, the town has a total area of 73.61 square miles (190.65 km^{2}), of which 57.55 square miles (149.05 km^{2}) is land and 16.06 square miles (41.60 km^{2}) is water. Wells is drained by the Webhannet River. The highest point in town is Pine Hill, located one-half mile south of the intersection of State Route 9 and Bragdon Road, which is 360 feet (110 m) above sea level. The lowest elevation is sea level, along the coastline with the Atlantic Ocean.

Wells is part of the Portland-South Portland-Biddeford Metropolitan Statistical Area.

== Demographics ==
Historical population
Census	Pop.	Note	%±
1790	3,070		—
1800	3,692		20.3%
1810	4,489		21.6%
1820	2,660		−40.7%
1830	2,978		12.0%
1840	2,978		0.0%
1850	2,945		−1.1%
1860	2,878		−2.3%
1870	2,773		−3.6%
1880	2,450		−11.6%
1890	2,029		−17.2%
1900	2,007		−1.1%
1910	1,908		−4.9%
1920	1,943		1.8%
1930	2,047		5.4%
1940	2,144		4.7%
1950	2,321		8.3%
1960	3,528		52.0%
1970	4,448		26.1%
1980	8,211		84.6%
1990	7,778		−5.3%
2000	9,400		20.9%
2010	9,589		2.0%
2020	11,314		18.0%

=== 2010 Census ===
As of the census of 2010, there were 9,589 people, 4,120 households, and 2,734 families living in the town. The population density was 166.6 inhabitants per square mile (64.3/km^{2}). There were 8,557 housing units at an average density of 148.7 units per square mile (57.4 units/km^{2}). The racial makeup of the town was 97.2% White, 0.5% African American, 0.2% Native American, 0.6% Asian, 0.2% from other races, and 1.3% from two or more races. Hispanic or Latino of any race were 1.2% of the population.

There were 4,120 households, of which 24.5% had children under the age of 18 living with them, 54.6% were married couples living together, 8.1% had a female householder with no husband present, 3.6% had a male householder with no wife present, and 33.6% were non-families. Of all households, 26.2% were made up of individuals, and 11.4% had someone living alone who was 65 years of age or older. The average household size was 2.30 and the average family size was 2.77.

The median age in the town was 48.5 years. 18.6% of residents were under the age of 18; 5.4% were between the ages of 18 and 24; 20.2% were from 25 to 44; 34.8% were from 45 to 64; and 21% were 65 years of age or older. The gender makeup of the town was 48.3% male and 51.7% female.

=== 2000 Census ===
As of the 2000 United States census, there were 9,400 people, 4,004 households, and 2,690 families living in the town. The population density was 163.1 inhabitants per square mile (63.0/km^{2}). There were 7,794 housing units at an average density of 135.2 units per square mile (52.2 units/km^{2}). The racial makeup of the town was 98.18% White, 0.23% African American, 0.20% Native American, 0.48% Asian, 0.01% Pacific Islander, 0.14% from other races, and 0.76% from two or more races. Hispanic or Latino of any race were 0.64% of the population.

There were 4,004 households, out of which 25.6% had children under the age of 18 living with them, 57.7% were married couples living together, 6.7% had a female householder with no husband present, and 32.8% were non-families. Of all households, 26.3% were made up of individuals, and 11.0% had someone living alone who was 65 years of age or older. The average household size was 2.35 and the average family size was 2.85.

In the town, the population was spread out, with 21.0% under the age of 18, 5.6% from 18 to 24, 26.4% from 25 to 44, 30.2% from 45 to 64, and 16.9% who were 65 years of age or older. The median age was 43 years. For every 100 females, there were 94.8 males. For every 100 females age 18 and over, there were 92.0 males.

The median income for a household in the town was $46,314, and the median income for a family was $53,644. Males had a median income of $39,682 versus $28,463 for females. The per capita income for the town was $23,130. About 3.1% of families and 5.4% of the population were below the poverty line, including 3.8% of those under age 18 and 5.6% of those age 65 or over.

== Arts and culture ==
=== Points of interest ===
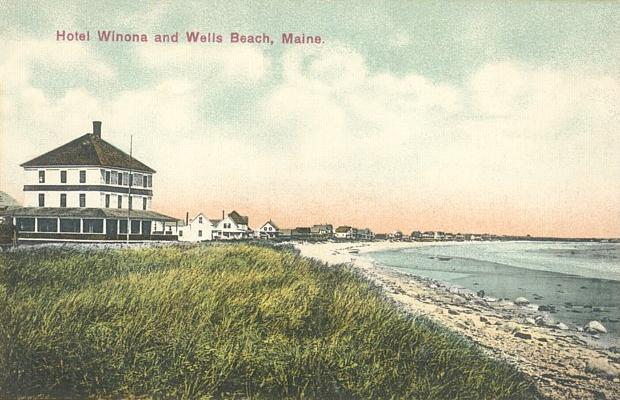
Wells Beach in 1908

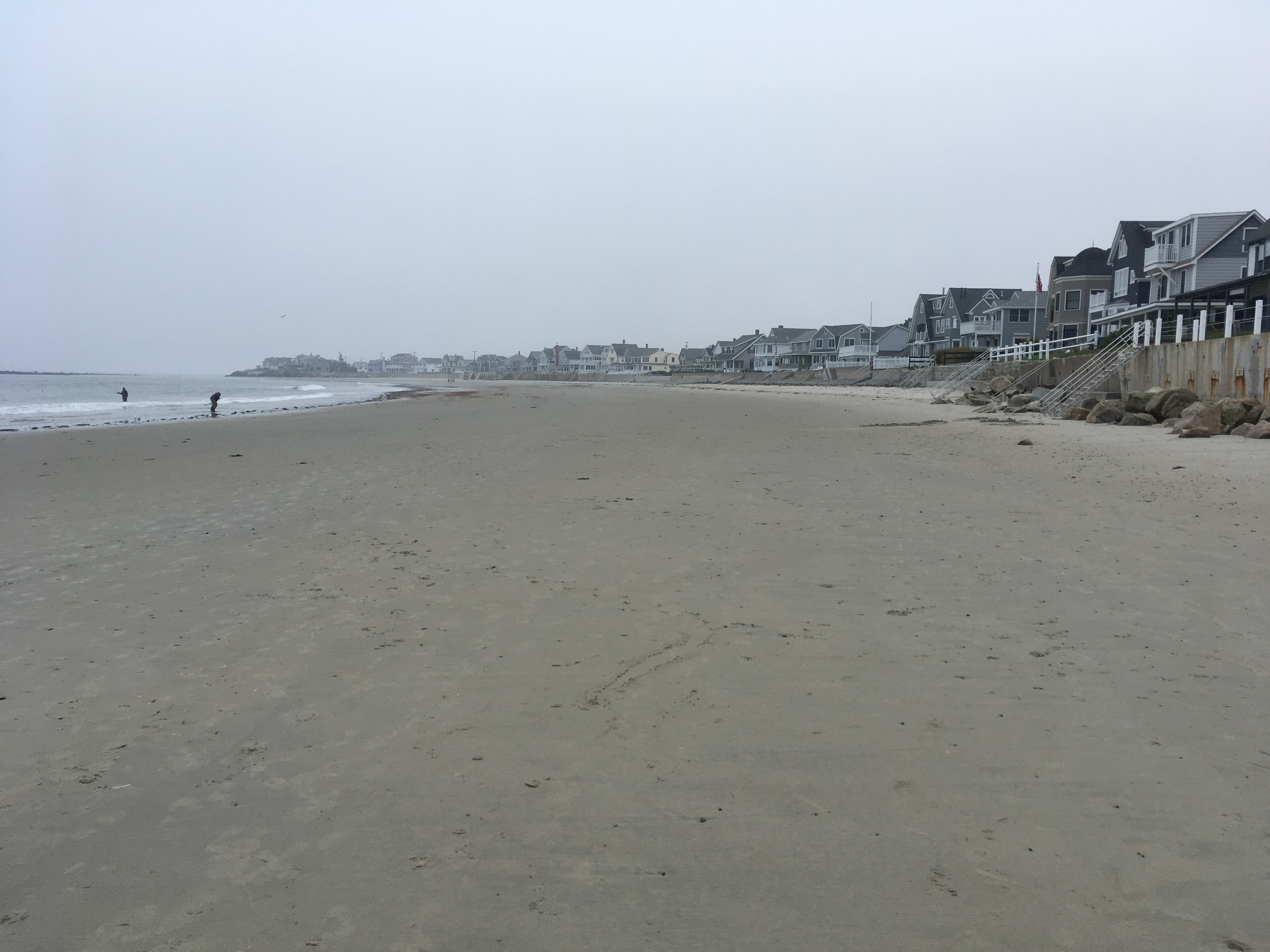
Wells Beach in 2017

- Drakes Island Beach, East Shore Beach, Wells Beach, and Moody Beach.
- Division 9 Schoolhouse Museum
- Meetinghouse Museum and Library, located on the premises of what was originally the First Congregational Church of Wells
- Maine Diner
- Rachel Carson National Wildlife Refuge
- Wells National Estuarine Research Reserve and Laudholm Farm
- Wells Public Library

== Parks and recreation ==
The Eastern Trail, a multi-use trail, part of the East Coast Greenway

== Education ==
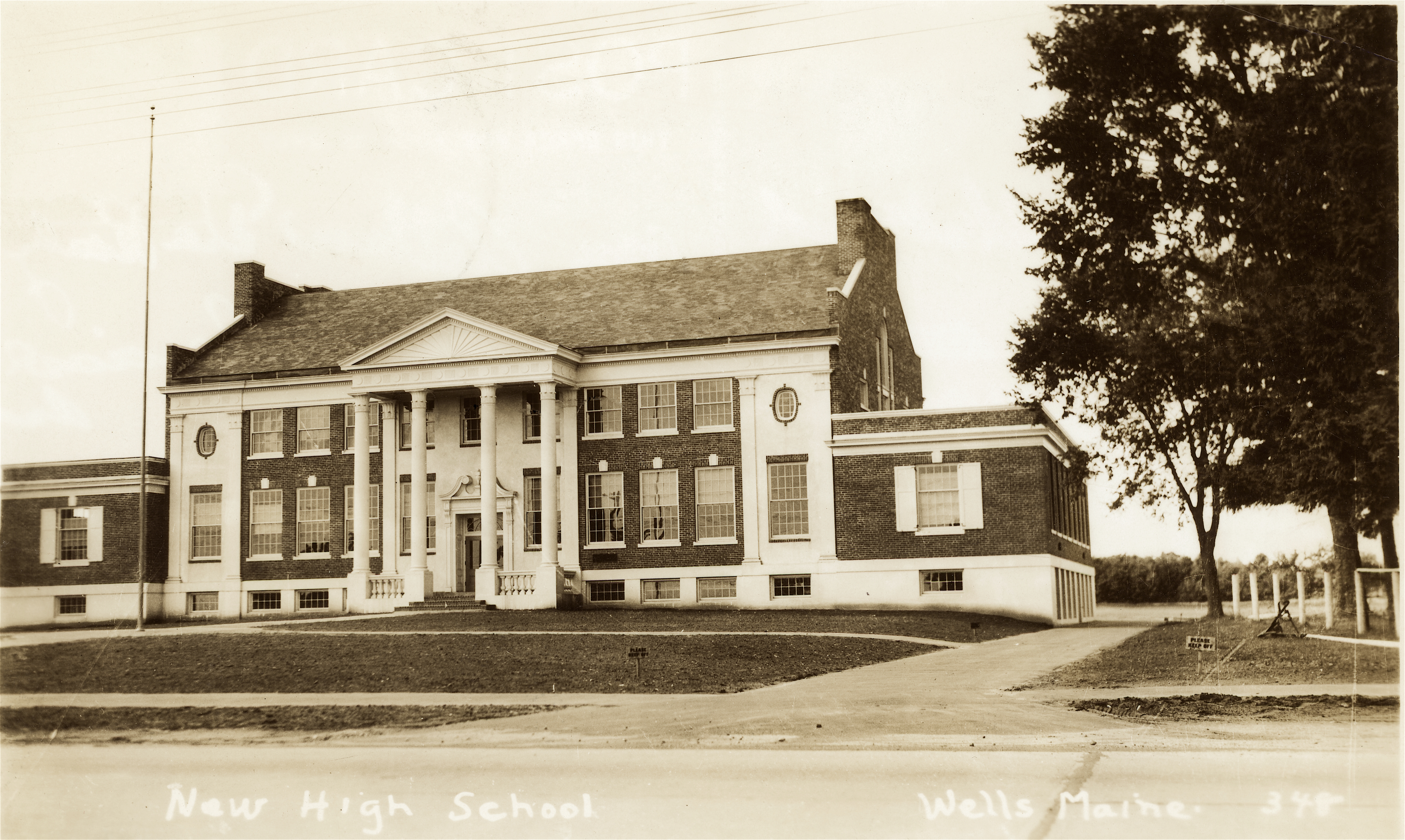
Wells Junior High School (built in 1937 as the third Wells High School).

Wells has three public K–12 schools, all part of the Wells-Ogunquit Community School District: Wells Elementary School (kindergarten through fourth grade), Wells Junior High School (fifth grade through eighth grade), Wells High School (ninth grade through twelfth grade, as well as adult education programs).

The Wells High School Football team has won seven combined state championships between Classes B, C, and D.

York County Community College is a public community college in Wells that is part of the Maine Community College System. The college was established by the Maine Legislature in 1994 and opened in 1995 with an initial enrollment of 156 students. In 1999, YCCC received full accreditation from the New England Association of Schools and Colleges.

== Infrastructure ==
=== Transportation ===
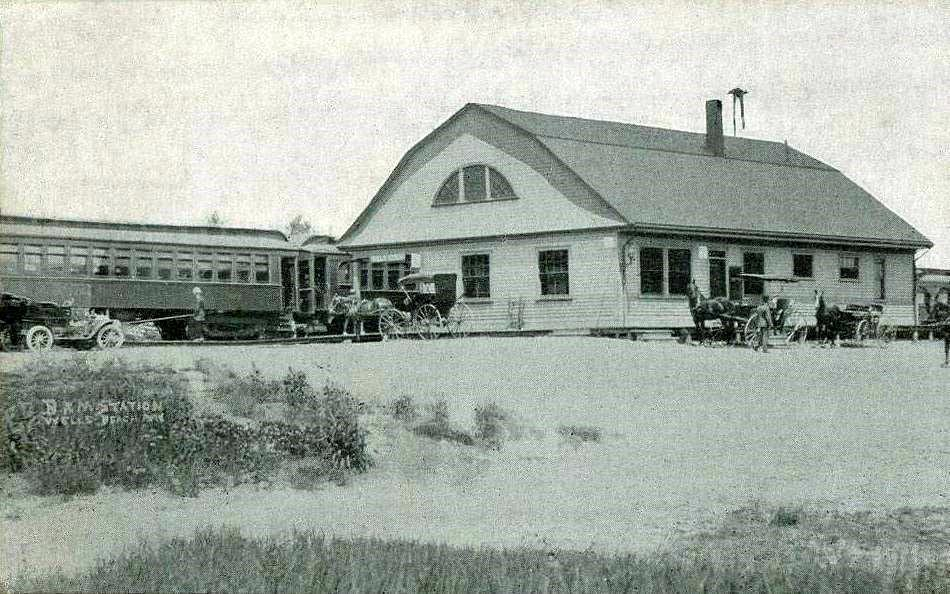
B&M railroad station in 1910.

Highways:

- Interstate 95 (Maine Turnpike Exit 19)
- U.S. Route 1
- Maine State Route 9
- Maine State Route 9A
- Maine State Route 109

Railways:

- The Pan Am Railways mainline (formerly the Boston & Maine Railroad)
- Amtrak is accessible at the Wells Regional Transportation Center, served by the Downeaster train.

== Notable people ==
- George Burroughs, clergyman, victim of the Salem witch trials
- Kathleen Chase, Maine state representative
- Ronald F. Collins, Maine state senator
- Jonathan Courtney, Maine state senator
- Nate Dingle, NFL football player
- Daniel W. Gooch, US congressman
- Ivory Kimball, judge
- Steve Lavigne, comic book illustrator
- Nathaniel Littlefield, U.S. congressman; captain, Revolutionary War, Coast Guard at Wells and Kittery
- Ryan Peters (stage name Spose), rapper
- John Fairfield Scamman, US congressman
- John Storer, founder of Storer College
- Bob Tewksbury, former MLB pitcher
- Luis Tiant, Boston Red Sox
- Guy Tripp, Business executive and U.S. Army brigadier general
- Esther Wheelwright, Mother Superior of the Ursuline order in Quebec City
- John Wheelwright, clergyman, original settler of Wells
- Bob Winn, distance runner and local politician
