= Kathleen Chase =

American politician

Kathleen D. Chase

Member of the Maine House of Representatives from the 147th district
- In office 2006–2014

Personal details
- Party: Republican
- Spouse: Wayne "Butch" Chase
- Occupation: Business owner
- Website: KathleenDChase.com

Kathleen D. Chase is an American business owner and politician from Maine who is a Republican who served in the Maine House of Representatives, representing the 147th district, which covered a portion of her hometown of Wells. Chase served from 2006 to 2014 in the Maine House of Representatives. She was unable to seek re-election in 2014 due to term-limits.

Chase grew up in Wells and graduated from Wells High School in 1969. She received an associate's degree in liberal arts from the University of Southern Maine in 1991. She was the tax assessor for the town of Wells from 1988 to 2006. Chase and her husband own several small businesses in Wells.

Chase served as a member of the Joint Standing Committee on Appropriations and Financial Affairs.

In February 2011, Chase proposed a strict new immigration law based on the controversial Arizona immigration law known as SB 1070. Chase said her bill would only target illegal aliens, while opponents claimed it would hurt legal immigrants and the state's economy.
