= Wells High School =

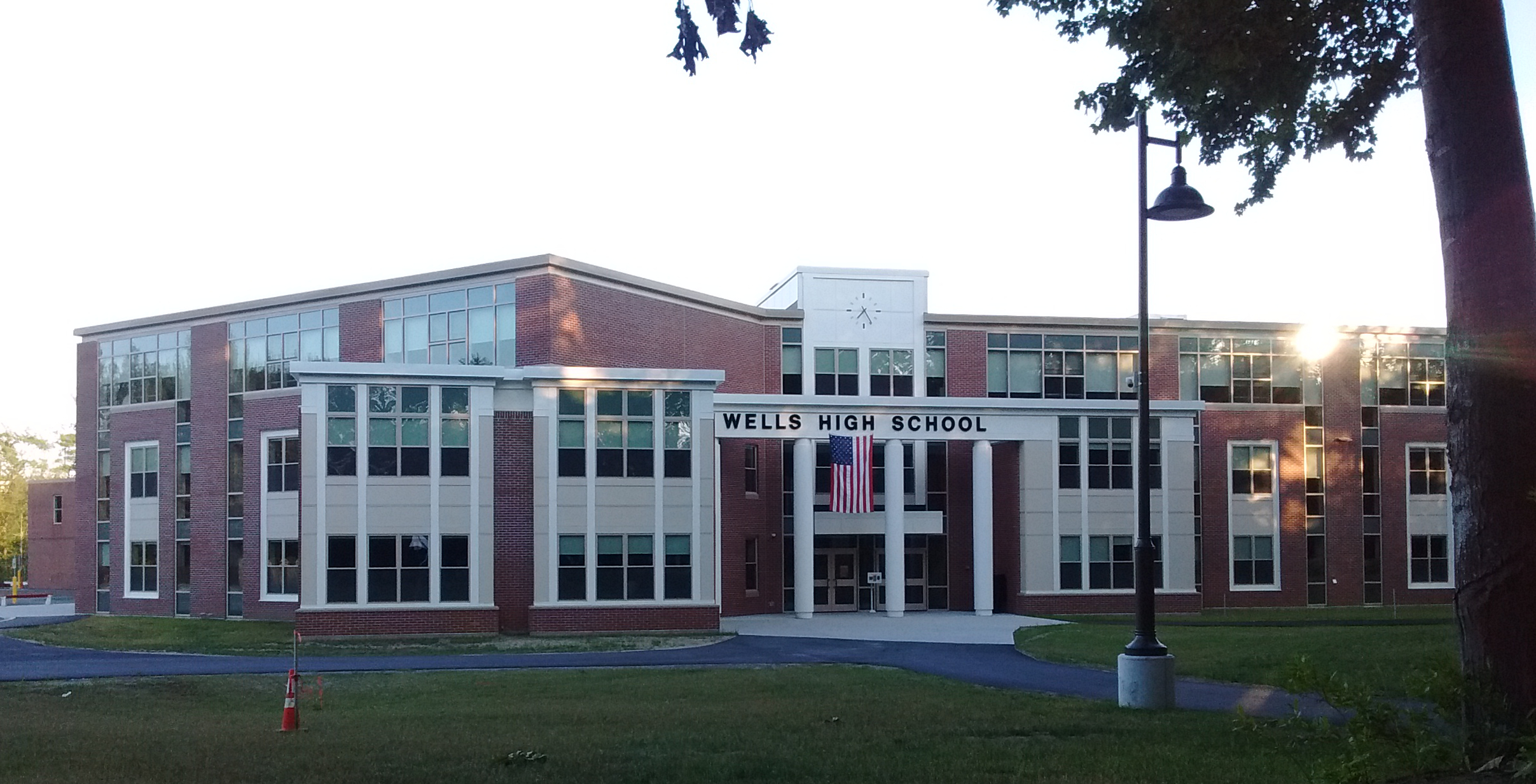

Location
- 200 Sanford Road (ME-109); Wells, Maine 04090; United States; 43°19′11″N 70°35′23″W

Information
- Type: Public high school
- Motto: School Motto: Striving For Excellence
- Established: 1901
- School district: Wells-Ogunquit Community School District
- Principal: Eileen M. Sheehy
- Grades: 9–12
- Enrollment: 423 (2023–2024)
- Hours in school day: 6.5
- Colors: red, white, and black
- Fight song: Down the Field
- Athletics: baseball, basketball, cheerleading, field hockey, football, golf, lacrosse, soccer, softball, tennis, track and field, wrestling
- Athletics conference: Western Maine, Class B
- Mascot: Warrior
- Accreditation: New England Association of Schools and Colleges
- Newspaper: Wells Street Journal
- Yearbook: Abenaki
- Performing Arts: chorus, color guard, concert band, jazz band, marching band, percussion ensemble, theatre, winter guard
- Website: whs.k12wocsd.net

Wells High School is a public school located in Wells, Maine, United States. It has an enrollment of 423 students in grades 9 through 12. The school primarily serves students from Wells, as well as smaller numbers of students from Ogunquit, which was part of the town of Wells until 1980 and has never had its own high school. From 1968 until 2006, Wells High School also served students from the town of Acton, which has also never had a high school of its own.

For the 2013–2014 school year, Wells High School had a graduation rate of 100% — the highest graduation rate of any public high school in Maine. It is ranked 26th in best high schools in Maine, according to U.S. News & World Report. The Maine Department of Education also ranks Wells High School in the top 10 statewide, and #1 in York County.

Wells High School is the sole high school in the Wells-Ogunquit Community School District, and is also home to the district's adult education and distance education programs.

== History ==
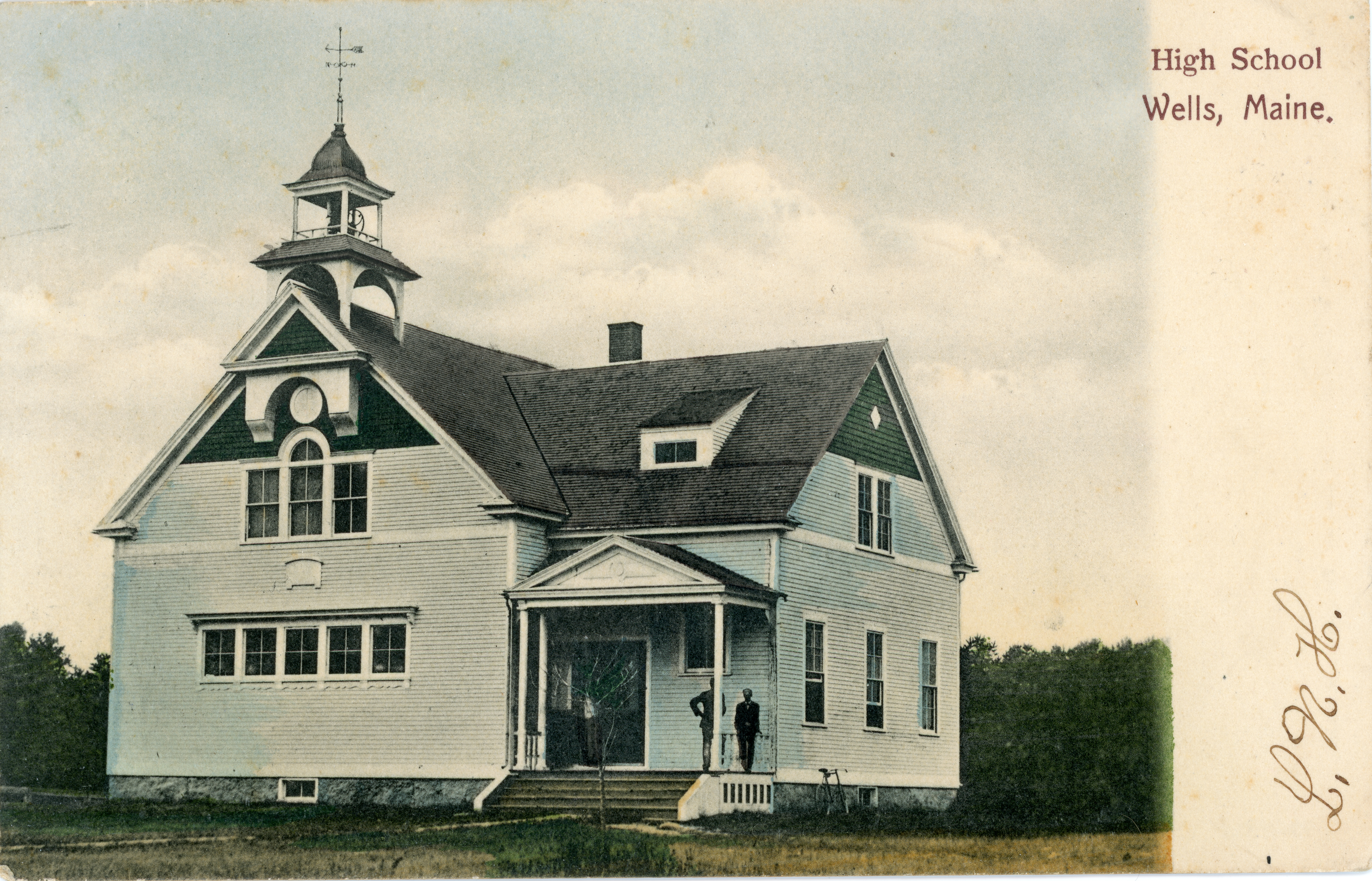
The 1901 building

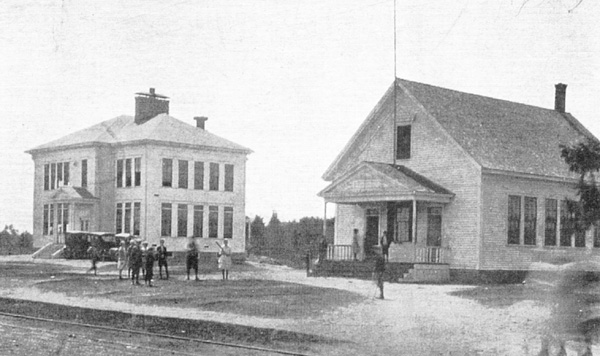
The 1909 building (left) and the Division 2 school (right)

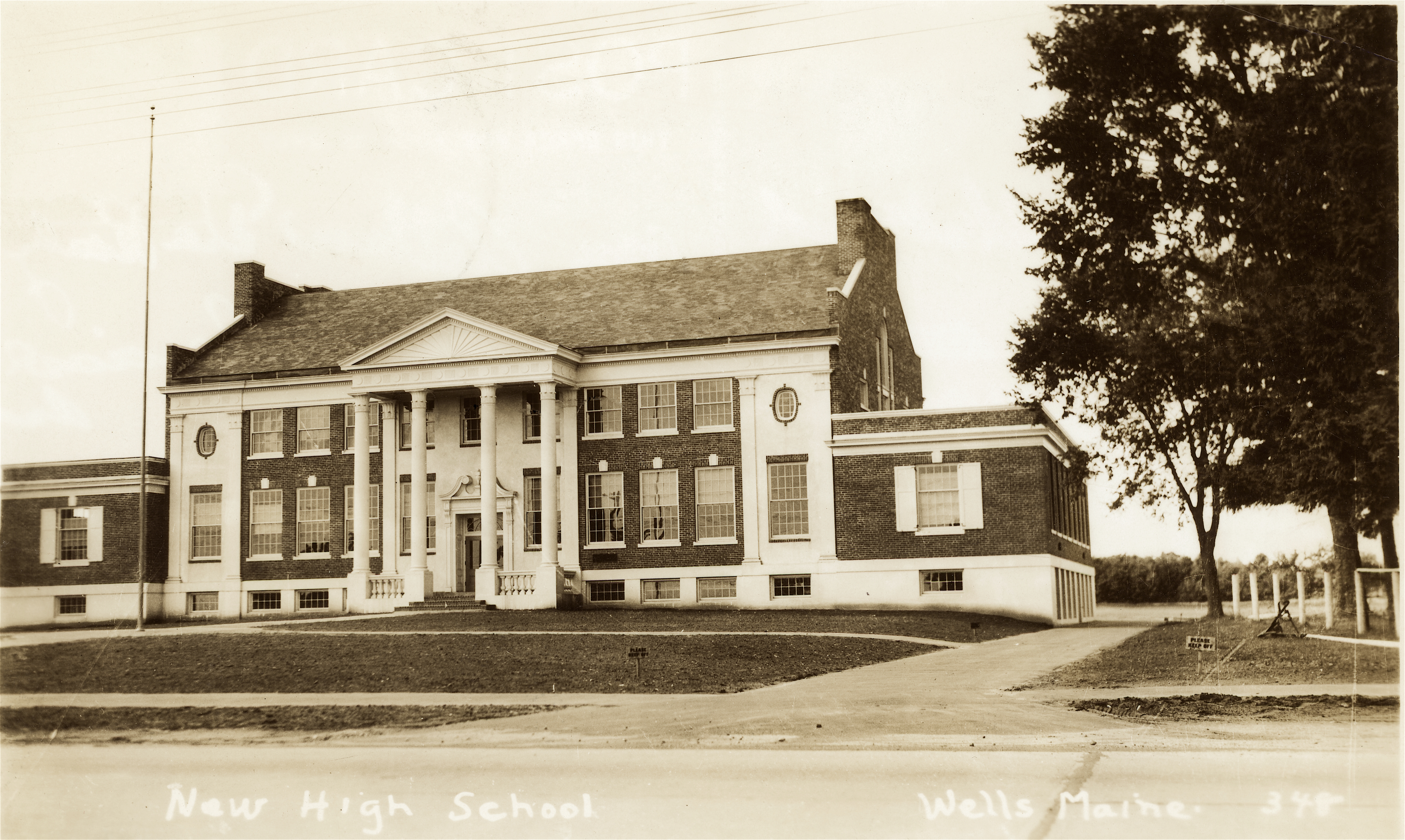
The 1937 building

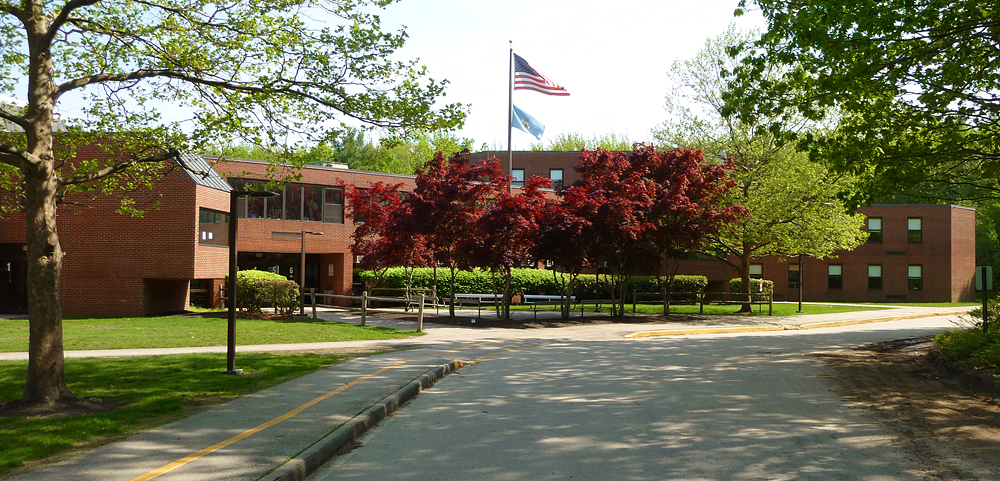
The 1977 building

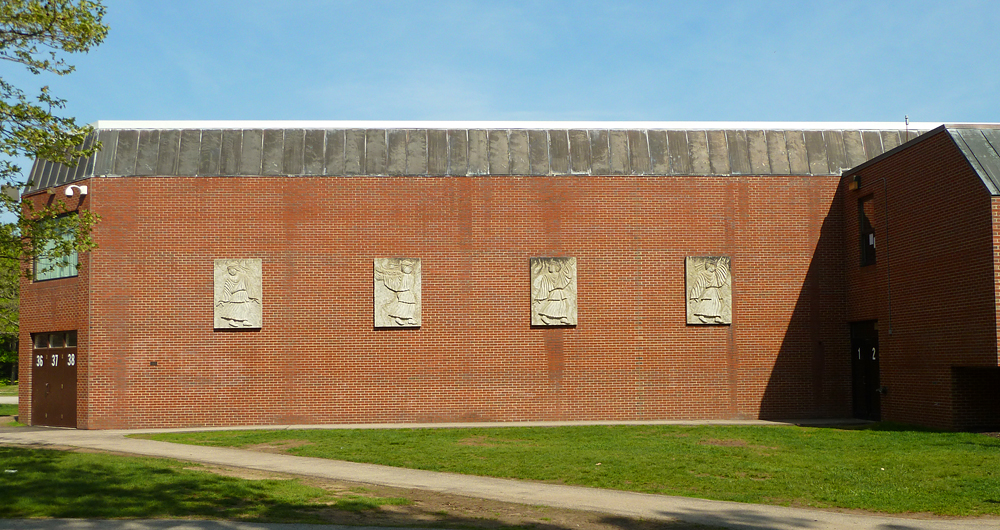
Ronco Gymnasium (part of the 1977 building)

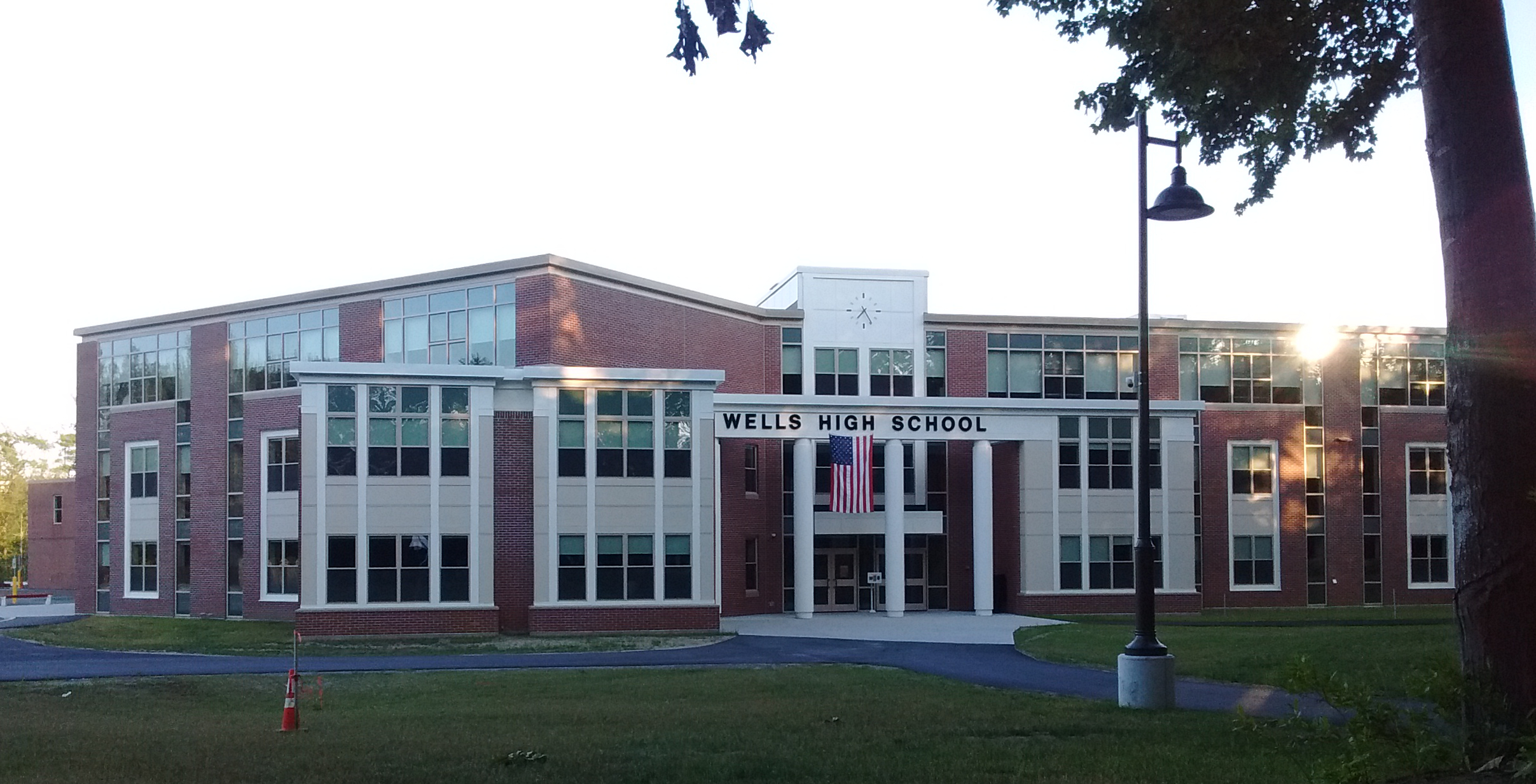
The renovated 1977 building

Wells High School traces its origins back to 1873, when the state of Maine enacted the Free High School Act. The law gave towns the ability to establish public high schools which would receive 50% of their funding from the state. Classes were held at the existing one-room schools located throughout the town.

By the mid-1890s, it became clear that holding high school classes in several locations was not an optimal arrangement. In 1901, voters at the annual town meeting were asked whether they wanted to build a standalone high school. The vote passed. Later that same year, constructed at a cost of $3,650, Wells High School opened its doors.

The first class graduated in 1903, with all nine students — seven girls and two boys — receiving diplomas. The graduation ceremony was held at the Second Congregational Church (today known as the Wells Congregational Church, UCC), in what was considered an extraordinarily special and historic event. The class motto was Vestigia Nulla Retrorsum — Latin for "no footsteps backward."

In 1909, Wells High School suffered an extensive fire. A new, larger building was immediately built on the same site. The high school suffered another fire in 1922. Classes were held at the town hall for several months while the building was repaired and enlarged.

In 1937, a new high school was built a few hundred feet north, and the 1909 building was turned into an elementary school. The 1937 building, located at 1470 Post Road (US-1) across from Ocean View Cemetery, was the first school in Wells to be constructed out of brick, and cost $90,000 to build. It was significantly larger than the previous building and included a combination gymnasium/auditorium on the top floor. It was designed by the Maine architectural firm of Miller & Beal, Inc.

In 1939, the 1909 building was completely destroyed by fire, and was not rebuilt.

Construction of the fourth (and current) Wells High School began in 1976 and was completed in 1977. The building is located at 200 Sanford Road (ME-109) and was built at a cost of $2.9 million. It was designed by Wilbur R. Ingalls, Jr. The 1937 building became a junior high school that same year. The 1977 building originally had only two stories, but Ingalls designed it so that a third story could be added later if the student population increased. A partial third story was constructed in the late 1980s in order to provide additional classrooms. One of the building's unique design features is that it resembles the letter "W" when viewed from above. The gymnasium was named in honor of Richard Ronco, a 1960 graduate of Wells High School and a member of the Wells School Committee. In 1999, the auditorium underwent interior renovations and was named in honor of Valjeane Olenn, who served as principal of Wells High School from 1986 to 1998. Olenn's tenure as principal was noteworthy for several reasons: she was the first female principal in Wells; she was one of the longest-serving principals of the high school; and she instituted block scheduling, which was new and innovative at the time.

Wells High School celebrated its 100th graduating class in 2003 — which was also the 350th anniversary of the town's incorporation.

In November 2013, voters in Wells and Ogunquit approved a $27 million renovation/expansion project for the high school, to be funded solely by taxpayers in the two towns. The existing classroom wing was demolished and replaced. The gymnasium, auditorium, cafeteria, library, and music spaces were renovated and expanded. Electrical, plumbing, heating, ventilation, and computer network systems were refurbished or replaced. The entire facility was brought up to current A.D.A. and life safety standards. The renovations and additions were designed by Lavallee Brensinger Architects. Work began in late 2014 and concluded by the fall of 2016.

== Culture ==
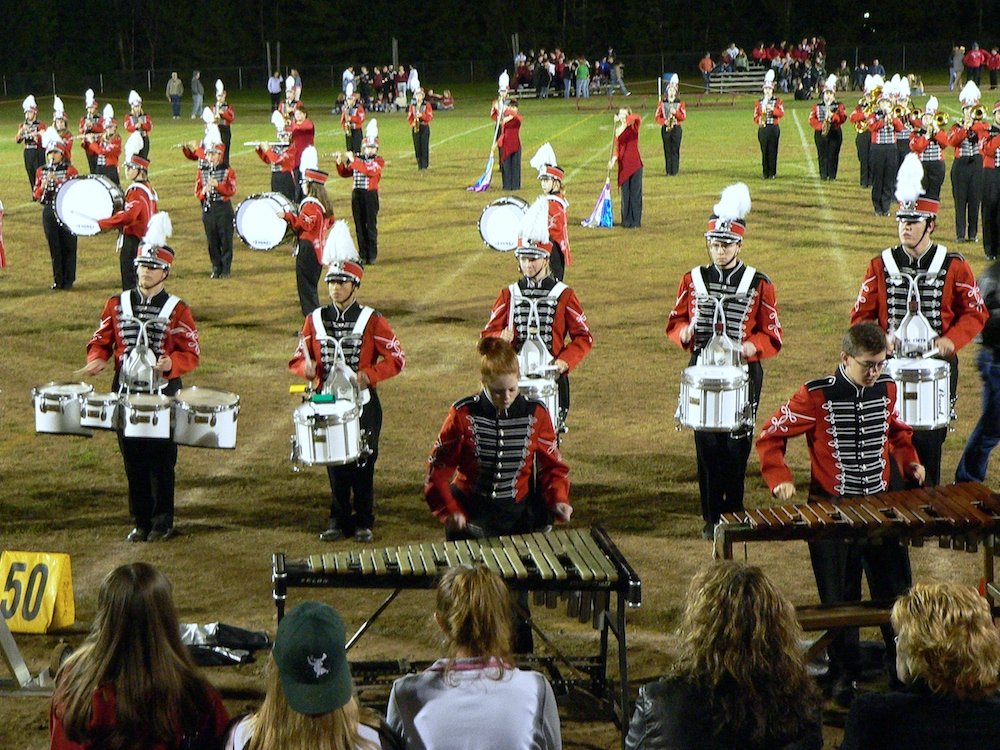
Wells High School Marching Band performing at a marching band competition in 2005

The school mascot is the Warrior and the title of the yearbook is Abenaki. Both names reflect the significance of Native Americans in the history of Wells. The school colors are red, white, and black.

In 2014, Wells High School announced plans to phase out certain visual aspects of the Warrior mascot — specifically the stereotypical profile of a male Native American person's head — in favor of different imagery, such as a stylized "W," in an effort to focus less on any specific race or ethnicity. As of 2016, however, certain renovated and newly constructed areas of the building, such as computer labs and the entrance to the athletics wing, prominently featured the "Indian head" image.

In 2018, Wells decided to keep the Warrior name but retire the Native American imagery that had been associated with it. This was partly in response to a 2017 Portland Press article that reported on offensive behavior by Wells fans mocking Native Americans at a high school football game.

In 2019, Maine became the first state to ban the use of Native American mascots in schools.

== Notable alumni ==
- Kathleen Chase – state representative (Class of 1969)
- Nathan Dingle – NFL football player (Class of 1989)
- Spose – rapper/producer (Class of 2004)
- Bob Winn – distance runner and local politician (Class of 1977)

== Principals ==
- 1903–1906: George Parsons
- 1906–1907: Norris Lord
- 1907–1908: E.H. Smith
- 1908–1911: Leroy Woods
- 1911–1914: Herbert Hill
- 1914–1919: Blynn Davis
- 1919–1923: Paul McIntire
- 1923–1927: H. Paul Larrabee
- 1927–1928: Forrest Beal
- 1928–1931: F.N. Eaton, Jr.
- 1931–1942: Aura Coleman
- 1942–1944: Thomas Maynard
- 1944–1945: Burton Irish
- 1945–1960: Norman Holder
- 1961–1964: Russel Noyes
- 1964–1965: Carl Knowlton
- 1965–1978: Matthew Flaherty
- 1978–1986: Carl Stasio
- 1986–1998: Valjeane M. Olenn
- 1998–2001: Edward McDonough
- 2002–2003: James Walsh
- 2003–2007: Milton Teguis
- 2007–2015: James Daly
- 2015–present: Eileen M. Sheehy
