= Rachel Carson National Wildlife Refuge =

Nature reserve in Kennebunk, Maine, US

- IUCN category IV (habitat/species management area)
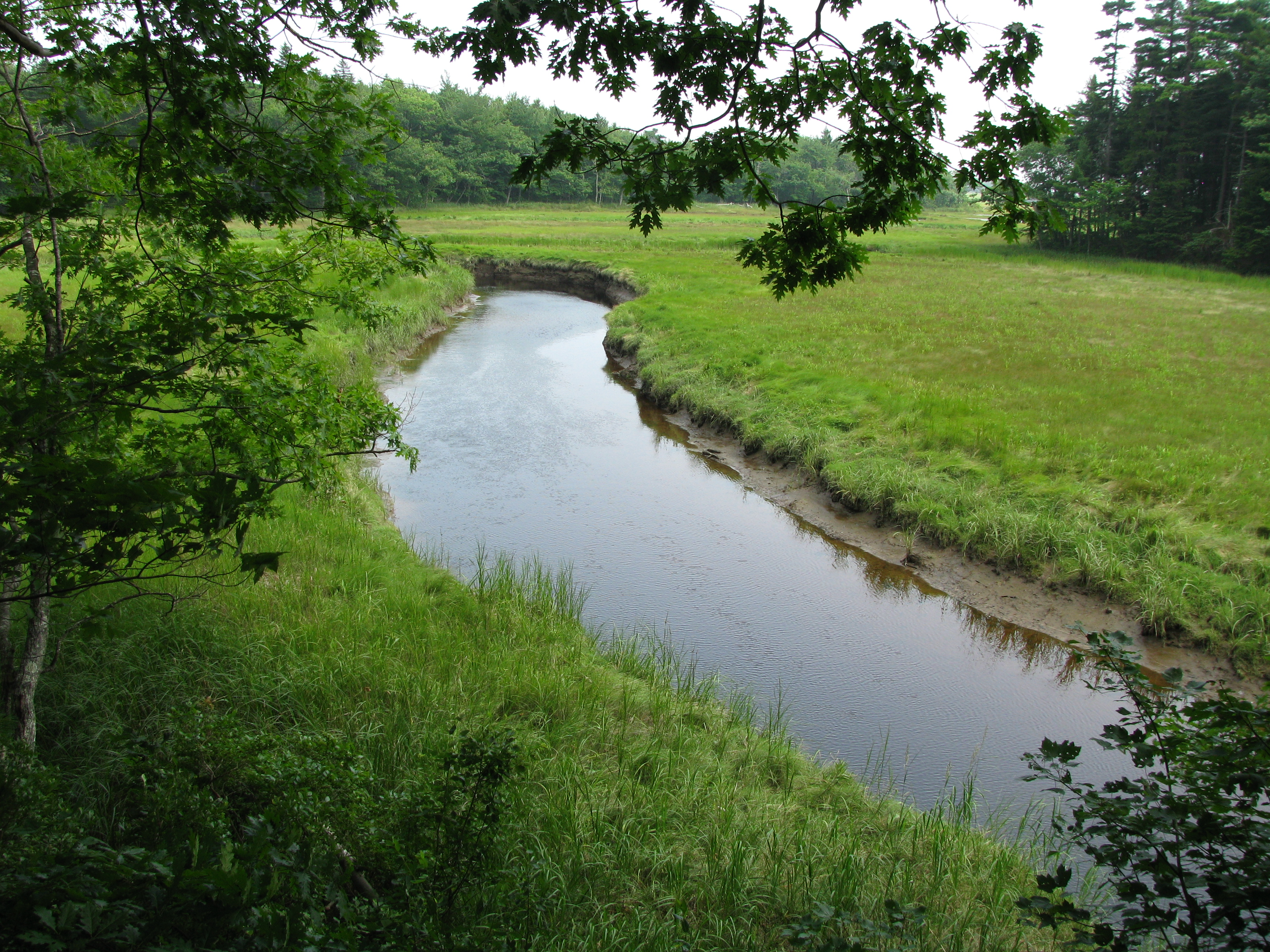
- Tidal salt marsh at the Rachel Carson National Wildlife Refuge in Wells, Maine.

- Location within the United States
- Location: Cumberland County, York County, Maine, United States
- Nearest city: Kennebunk, Maine
- Coordinates: 43°21′00″N 70°32′28″W
- Area: 9,125 acres (36.93 km^{2})
- Established: 1966
- Governing body: U.S. Fish and Wildlife Service
- Website: Rachel Carson National Wildlife Refuge

The Rachel Carson National Wildlife Refuge is a 9,125-acre (37 km^{2}) National Wildlife Refuge made up of several parcels of land along 50 miles (80 km) of Maine's southern coast. Created in 1966, it is named for environmentalist and author Rachel Carson, whose book Silent Spring raised public awareness of the effects of DDT on migratory songbirds, and of other environmental issues.

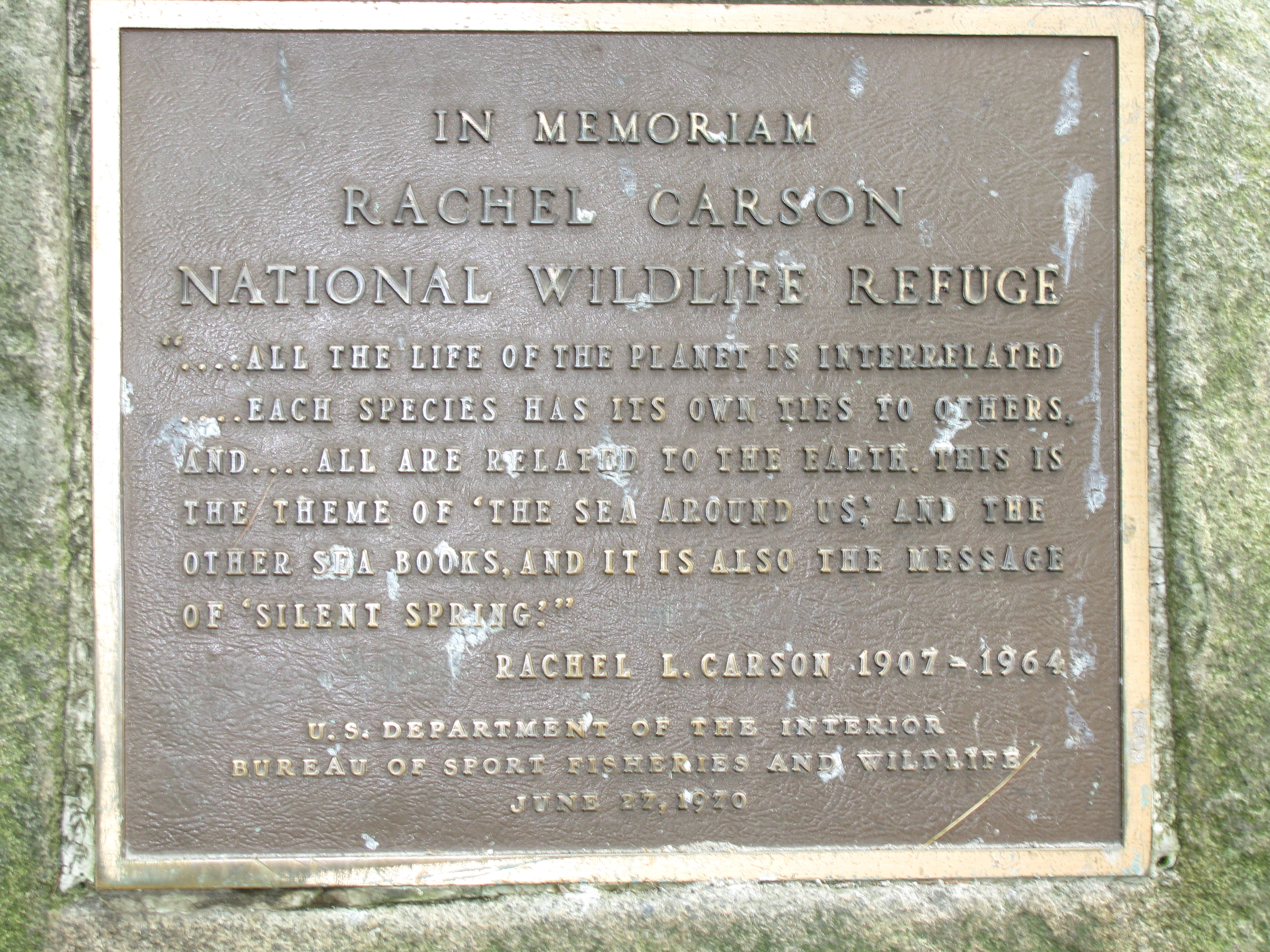
Plaque at the entrance to the refuge.

The refuge's parcels include protected areas between Kittery and Cape Elizabeth, including land in Wells, Kennebunk, Kennebunkport, Biddeford, Saco, and Scarborough.

The refuge protects 1,167 acres (4.72 km^{2}) of estuary salt marsh and uplands that drain into the Webhannet River, or about one-ninth of the river's watershed.

The refuge's headquarters are on Route 9 in Wells.

The refuge protects various kinds of habitat, including barrier beach, dune, tidal estuary, salt marsh, and rocky coastline. The piping plover, an endangered species, nests on refuge land.

A mile-long trail within the refuge was designated as a National Recreation Trail.

== Wildlife and habitat ==
The Rachel Carson National Wildlife Refuge was established to preserve ten important estuaries that are key points along migration routes of waterfowl and other migratory birds. During harsh winters, the refuge's marshes provide vital food and cover for waterfowl and other migrating birds at a time when inland waters are frozen. The refuge also supports piping plover, least terns, peregrine falcons, bald eagles, and other state and federally protected species. Nesting success of plover and terns has benefitted from the increased habitat protection. In addition to anadromous fish, many commercially and recreationally important fin and shellfish rely on these coastal wetlands as critical nursery areas.

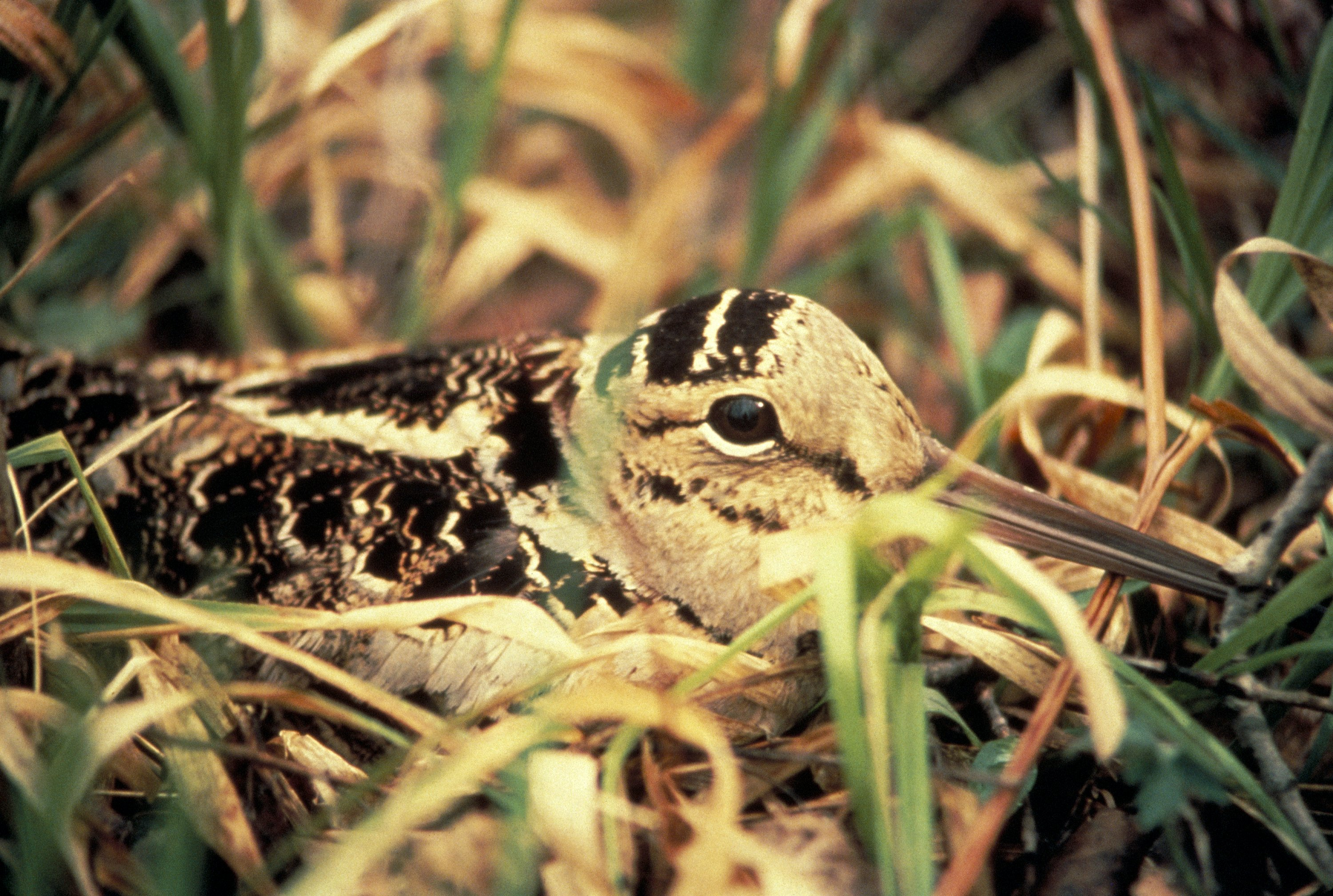
American woodcock

Refuge lands total over 9,125 acres (36.93 km^{2}) in eleven geographic units from Kittery to Cape Elizabeth, Maine. In 1989, the refuge boundary expanded to include salt marsh, freshwater wetlands, and "critical edge" uplands around each of the nine divisions. In addition, the Biddeford Pool Division, the tenth division of the refuge, was created. This division serves as a key staging area in southern Maine for a large number and diversity of shorebirds. In 2007 the final Comprehensive Conservation Plan was signed, adding the eleventh division, York River Division. When land acquisitions are complete, the refuge will be about 14,600 acres (59 km^{2}) in size.

In 1984, a National Estuarine Research Reserve was established in Wells, Maine. The reserve land is made up of portions of the Upper and Lower Wells divisions of the refuge. Together, the reserve and refuge function to further the knowledge and understanding of estuaries throughout the community. The goal is to promote an increased stewardship and, ultimately, a greater protection of the estuaries.

=== Threatened and endangered wildlife species ===
The piping plover is designated federally threatened and state endangered in Maine. Fifty to 75% of the Maine piping plover population nests at sites on or near the refuge, including Crescent Surf Beach, Goosefare Brook, and Marshall Point at Goose Rocks.

New England cottontails (Sylvilagus transitionalis) are found in Maine. Cottontails inhabit early successional habitat that was relatively abundant in the early to mid-20th century. As farms were abandoned, the species did very well. Subsequently, increased development and reforestation has led to a population decline as this type of habitat became increasingly rare. The refuge prohibited rabbiting starting in 1998 because of ongoing population declines. Subsequently, the Service was petitioned in 2000 to list the New England cottontail under the Endangered Species Act. Currently, New England cottontail is listed as a Candidate Species under the Endangered Species Act and as endangered in Maine.

=== Migratory birds ===
==== Salt marsh birds ====
In 1995, sharp-tailed sparrows were divided into two separate species: the Nelson's sharp-tailed sparrow (Ammodramus nelsoni) and the saltmarsh sharp-tailed sparrow (Ammodramus caudacutus). Saltmarsh sharp-tailed sparrows are found in salt marshes along the Atlantic coast from the Delmarva Peninsula north to southern Maine. Within the refuge both species are found only on salt marshes. The saltmarsh sharp-tailed sparrow is an obligate salt marsh species that spends its entire life cycle on salt marshes.

==== Waterbirds ====
Common loons (Gavia immer) frequent the lower reaches of tidal creeks of all refuge divisions from late autumn through early spring. They are commonly observed feeding on green crabs and small fish. During spring, summer and autumn migration, 11 species of wading birds use the estuarine systems of the refuge.

==== Waterfowl ====
Twenty-six species of waterfowl are recorded from the refuge. The most commonly observed species are American black duck (Anas rubripes), Canada goose (Branta canadensis), mallard (Anas platyrhynchos), green-winged teal (Anas carolinensis), common goldeneye (Bucephala clangula), bufflehead (Bucephala albeola), and red-breasted merganser (Mergus serrator). Dabbling ducks use salt pannes and the upper reaches of tidal creeks, while diving ducks prefer deeper parts of the tidal creeks and the mouths of rivers and streams. Black ducks, mallards, and increasing numbers of Canada geese breed on each division of the refuge. Wood ducks (Aix sponsa) breed on the Upper Wells and Mousam River Divisions each year.

==== Shorebirds ====
Southern coastal Maine is a migration and staging area for much of the North American shorebird population. Thousands of shorebirds feed along coastal beaches and mudflats as they migrate through the state. Biddeford Pool serves as one of the top shorebird staging areas in southern Maine. The most common species observed in the autumn include semipalmated plover (Charadrius semipalmatus), black-bellied plover (Pluvialis squatarola), least sandpiper (Calidris minutilla), greater yellowlegs (Tringa melanoleuca), short-billed dowitcher (Limnodromus griseus), and semipalmated sandpiper (Calidris pusilla). These species and others typically feed in the mudflats at low tide. Most shorebirds feed in salt pannes and roost in pannes and adjacent upland areas during high tides.

==== Gulls and terns ====
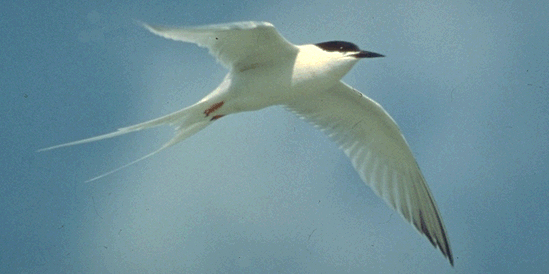
Roseate tern in flight

Herring gulls (Larus argentatus) and great black-backed gulls (Larus marinus) are the most common gull species sighted on the refuge. They frequent all divisions throughout the year, but are most abundant in the autumn and winter when they roost on the marsh and tidal flats, and occasionally steal food from diving ducks in tidal creeks. Ring-billed gulls (Larus delawarensis) also are common throughout the refuge, particularly during non-breeding season. During autumn and winter migration, Bonaparte's gulls (Larus philadelphia) feed and roost at the mouths of tidal creeks and rivers throughout the refuge, but they are most abundant on the Biddeford Pool, Upper Wells, and Lower Wells divisions.

Least terns nest on the refuge in several locations. In the mid-1980s, common terns nested in the salt marsh on the Lower Wells and Little River divisions. Roseate terns (Sterna dougallii) nested on West Goose Rocks Island in 1985, and lately, have been observed along Crescent Surf Beach in the Upper Wells Division. In 2003, Crescent Surf Beach hosted the largest nesting colony (157 pairs) of least terns in Maine. Early season crow predation and late season owl and coyote predation depressed productivity. The refuge controls diurnal predators such as crows and foxes with several techniques, including hazing, fencing, trapping, and shooting. Least terns also nest at Laudholm Beach, Goose Rocks, Higgins, and Reid State Park. During migration, large numbers of common terns, along with smaller numbers of roseate terns (15), stage at Crescent Surf Beach.

==== Land birds ====
Over 120 species of land birds have been recorded at the refuge, with over 72 nesting. Some of those include great crested flycatcher (Myiarchus crinitus), tree swallow (Tachycineta bicolor), hermit thrush (Catharus guttatus), black-throated green warbler (Dendroica virens), scarlet tanager (Piranga olivacea), and others. Forests, woodlands, and swamps surrounding refuge salt marshes also provide habitat for many raptors. Many migrating raptors use forested areas next to marshes as hunting perches and feeding areas. Sharp-shinned hawk (Accipiter striatus), Cooper's hawk (Accipiter cooperii), and broad-winged hawk (Buteo platypterus) have nested in forested habitat on the refuge. Northern goshawks (Accipiter gentilis) and red-tailed hawks (Buteo jamaicensis) nest in the area. During migration (primarily autumn), many raptors move through the refuge. Northern harriers are the only raptor species thought to breed in the estuarine communities of the refuge.

=== Mammals ===
White-tailed deer (Odocoileus virginianus) are the mammal most commonly observed on the refuge. Their trails cut through certain portions of the salt marsh on each division, although they more typically are observed along marsh edges and in surrounding forests. The refuge lies entirely within Wildlife Management District No. 24, which had an estimated winter deer population density of 30/sq mi (12/km^{2}) in 1997. The Wildlife Division Research and Management Report (2000) stated that the herd has continued to grow at 15 percent per year, and the wintering deer population density is now nearly 40/sq mi (15/km^{2}). In certain areas of the refuge, hunting (including white-tailed deer) is prohibited because of state designated Game Sanctuaries. Deer population densities in those areas are estimated from 50/sq mi (19/km^{2}) to more than 100/sq mi (40/km^{2}). Those densities far exceed the state target of 50 percent to 60 percent of carrying capacity.

Raccoon (Procyon lotor) tracks and scats abound on all divisions. Their sign most often appears along the edges of tidal creeks and salt pannes, where they search for green crabs and small fish. Care must be taken to distinguish raccoon sign from that of river otters (Lutra canadensis), another mammal that forages extensively in the marshes. River otters are observed infrequently in the salt hay along the edges of tidal creeks. Most recently, river otters were seen in the Merriland River and Branch Brook in the Upper Wells Division.

Mink (Mustela vison), striped skunk (Mephitis mephitis), red fox (Vulpes fulva), and coyote (Canis latrans) also hunt within the estuary. Beaver (Castor canadensis) and muskrat (Ondatra zibethicus) are occasionally seen swimming in tidal creeks. A few harbor seal (Phoca vitulina) haul-out sites exist on the Brave Boat harbor, Lower Wells, Mousam River and Goose Rocks divisions. Peak use occurs during the winter, but individuals are observed throughout the year. The Lower Wells haul-out site receives the most use, with peak counts of 30 seals. During the winter months harp seals (Pagophilus groenlandicus), and occasionally hooded seals (Cystophora cristata) and grey seals (Halichoerus grypus), can be found basking on refuge salt marshes and in offshore waters. Seal strandings are a common occurrence, and are reported to marine animal rescue agencies.

Many large mammals are found on or near the refuge. Moose (Alces laces) and black bear (Ursus americanus) are becoming more common in southern Maine as their populations continue to grow. They have been sighted on all refuge divisions except Moody. A bobcat (Lynx rufus) was reported as sporadically using the Upper and Lower Wells divisions in 1991 and 1992. Fishers (Martes pennanti) are increasingly sighted on the refuge; a vehicle killed a fisher near refuge headquarters in 1998, and several sightings around the headquarters have occurred since then. Gray fox (Urocyon cinereoargenteus) and short-tailed weasel (Mustela richardsonii) most likely use several refuge divisions. Porcupines (Erethizon dorsatum) and woodchucks (Marmota monax) are found throughout the refuge, where they occur in varied habitats.

Snowshoe hares (Lepus americanus) are found in forests throughout the refuge in areas with dense understory. White-footed mice (Peromyscus leucopus), meadow jumping mice (Zapus hudsonius), and meadow voles (Microtus pennsylvanicus) occasionally use the edge of salt marsh habitat. Masked shrews (Sorex cinereus), northern short-tailed shrews (Blarina brevicauda), southern red-backed voles (Clethrionomys gapperi), and pine voles (Microtus pinetorum) have also been caught in salt marshes.

Other small mammals that commonly are found on the refuge include eastern chipmunk (Tamias striatus), American red squirrel (Tamiasciurus hudsonicus), and eastern grey squirrel (Sciurus carolinensis). These species are most common in pine-oak forests where acorns are abundant. Southern flying squirrel (Glaucomys volans) is recorded for the Upper Wells and Brave Boat divisions, but they probably also occur in other areas with mature pine-oak forest. Other small mammals that are known or are likely to occur on the refuge include hairy-tailed mole (Parascalops breweri), star-nosed mole (Condylura cristata), smoky shrew (Sorex fumeus), and house mouse (Mus musculus).

=== Reptiles and amphibians ===
The refuge has a limited amount of freshwater cattail marsh or pond habitat. However, within its uplands, the refuge protects an extensive network of rivers, uplands and vernal pools, which provide important amphibian and reptile habitat. Frog call counts and limited vernal pool surveys were conducted on the refuge; American toad (Bufo americanus), green frog (Rana clamitans), wood frog (Rana sylvatica), pickerel frog (Rana palustris), bullfrog (Rana catesbeiana), gray tree frog (Hyla versicolor), and spring peeper (Pseudacris crucifer) are documented as breeding on most refuge divisions. In addition, yellow-spotted salamanders (Ambystoma maculatum), red back salamanders (Plethodon cinereus), and eastern newts (Notophthalmus viridescens) are recorded as common breeders. The blue-spotted salamander (Ambystoma laterale) and northern leopard frog (Rana pipiens) are uncommon, but likely are breeders on the refuge.

=== Documented species on the refuge ===
Garter snake (Thamnophis sirtalis), ribbon snake (Thamnophis sauritus, Maine—Special Concern), smooth green snake (Liochlorophis vernalis), redbelly snake (Storeria occipitomaculata), painted turtle (Chrysemys picta), snapping turtle (Chelydra serpentina), and spotted turtle (Clemmys guttata, Maine—Threatened) are documented species within the refuge. Species that are likely to use the refuge but are not documented include ringneck snake (Diadophis punctatus), milk snake (Lampropeltis triangulum), northern water snake (Nerodia sipedon), brown snake (Storeria dekayi, Maine Special Concern), Blanding's turtle (Emydoidea blandingii, Maine Endangered), and possibly, eastern racer (Coluber constrictor, Maine— Endangered), wood turtle (Clemmys insculpta, Maine—Special Concern) and common musk turtle (Sternotherus odoratus). Records indicate that both Blanding's turtle and spotted turtle occur in many locations along the refuge boundary. Wood turtle and black racer records are much less common, and musk turtle records in the vicinity of the refuge are nonexistent. Surveys targeted at detecting turtles and snakes could be developed and implemented on refuge lands with particular attention to the occurrence of the rare, secretive Blanding's turtle. Lands within the proposed acquisition boundary in Kennebunk and Biddeford have extensive vernal pool habitat that would benefit several Species of Concern.

=== Fish ===
Coastal marshes, bays, tidal creeks, and rivers support diverse shellfish and finfish populations. Sunfish (Lepomis species), creek chub (Semotilus atromaculatus), cunner (Tautogolabrus adspersus), golden shiner (Notemigonus crysoleucas), common mummichog (Fundulus heteroclitus), American eel (Anguilla rostrata), and white sucker (Catostomus commersoni) abound. Brook trout (Salvelinus fontinalis) and brown trout (Salmo trutta) are stocked in rivers and estuaries each year. The Ogunquit River sustains alewife (Alosa pseudoharengus), blueback herring (Alosa aestivalis), pollock (Pollachius virens), bluefish (Pomatomus saltatrix), longhorn sculpin (Myoxocephalus octodecimspinosus), and winter flounder (Pleuronectes americanus). The Webhannet River has native species such as winter flounder, northern pipefish (Syngnathus fuscus), Atlantic herring (Clupea harengus), common mummichog, Atlantic silversides (Menidia menidia) and Atlantic mackerel. The Merriland River sustains populations of American eel, brown trout, and brook trout. The Mousam River attracts little skate (Raja erinacea), American shad (Alosa sapidissima), striped bass (Morone saxatilis), bluefish, cunner, Atlantic mackerel (Scomber scombrus), pollock, and rainbow smelt (Osmerus mordax). The Spurwink River supports blueback herring, Atlantic menhaden (Brevoortia tyrannus), American shad, pollock, cunner, winter flounder, and little skate. Striped bass and brown trout are popular recreational fishing resources in the area. The National Marine Fisheries Service has designated as "essential fish habitat" areas that provide substrate necessary for fish spawning, breeding, feeding, or growth to maturity. Estuaries within the refuge boundaries are part of that essential fish habitat.

=== Habitat types ===
Rachel Carson NWR is approximately 35 percent tidal, 10 percent freshwater wetlands and 55 percent uplands. Tidal habitats include beach, dune, dune grassland, river, rocky shore, estuarine, bay, and salt marsh. Freshwater wetlands include cattail marsh, bog, emergent scrub-shrub wetlands, pocket swamps, red maple swamps, and floodplain forest. The majority of the upland forests consist of mixed oak and pine forest. However, hemlock, spruce and pitch pine stands occur, as well as hickory and maple forests.

Viburnums, winterberry, blueberry, serviceberry, Virginia rose, and male berry comprise much of the shrub understory. Other upland habitats consist of grassland units and thicket units. Habitats are quite diverse, containing elements from the more southern oak-pine forests and the coniferous forests of the north. Southern Maine is where these two community types collide and blend, creating a wealth of biodiversity.

The refuge has exemplary natural communities that include a coastal dune marsh ecosystem, Spartina saltmarsh, white oak – red oak forest, dune grassland, and pitch pine bog.

== Gallery ==
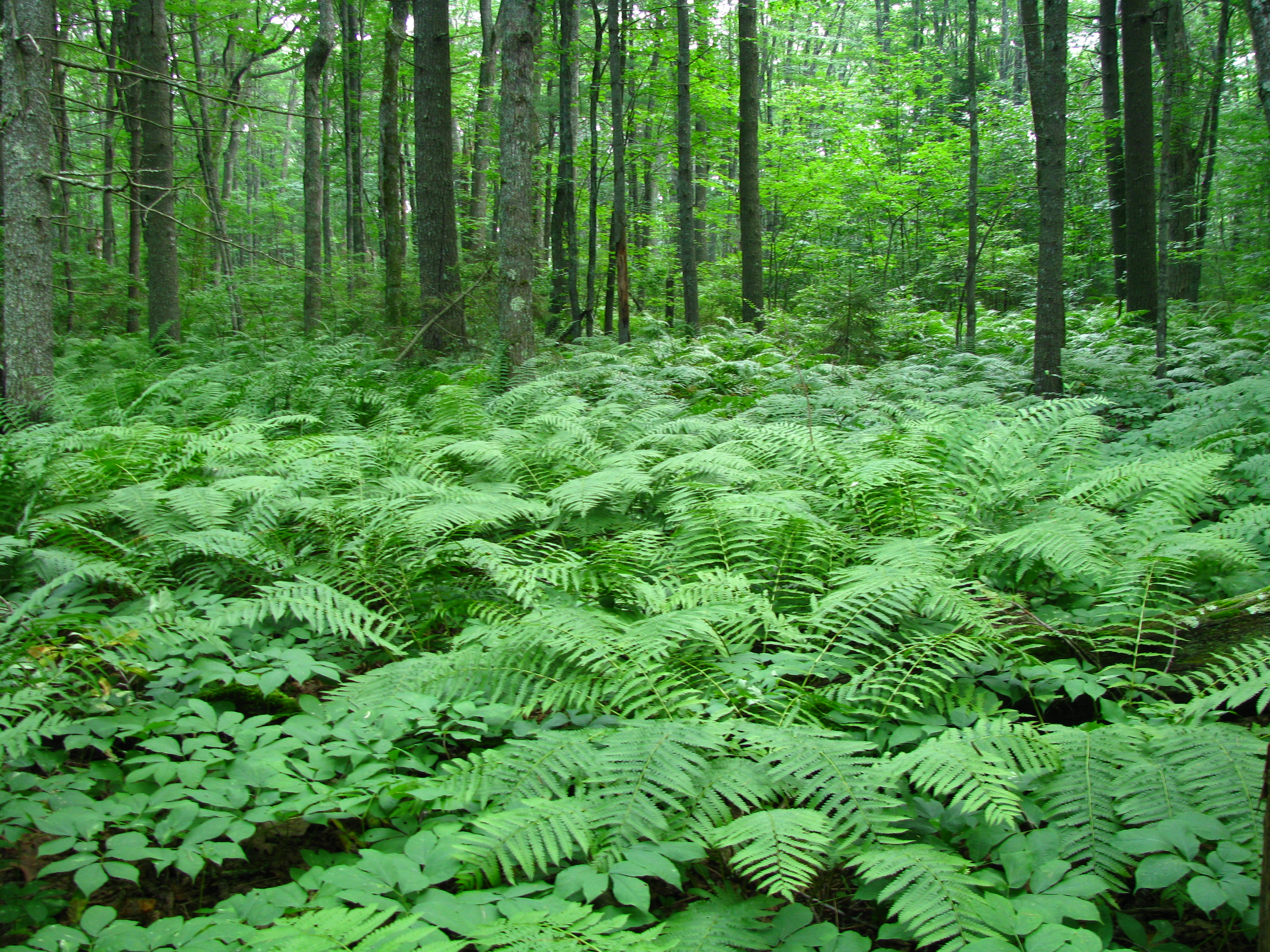

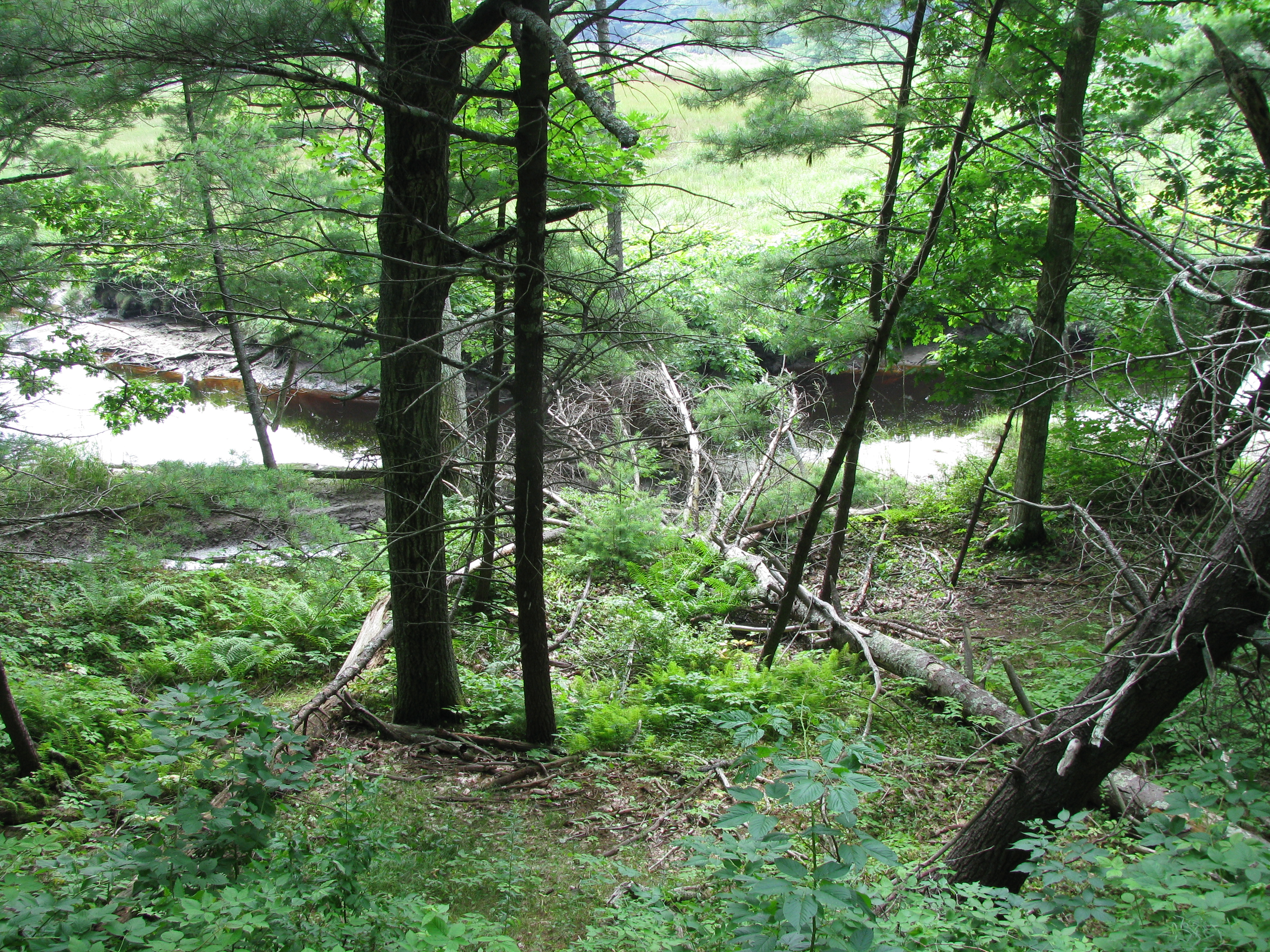

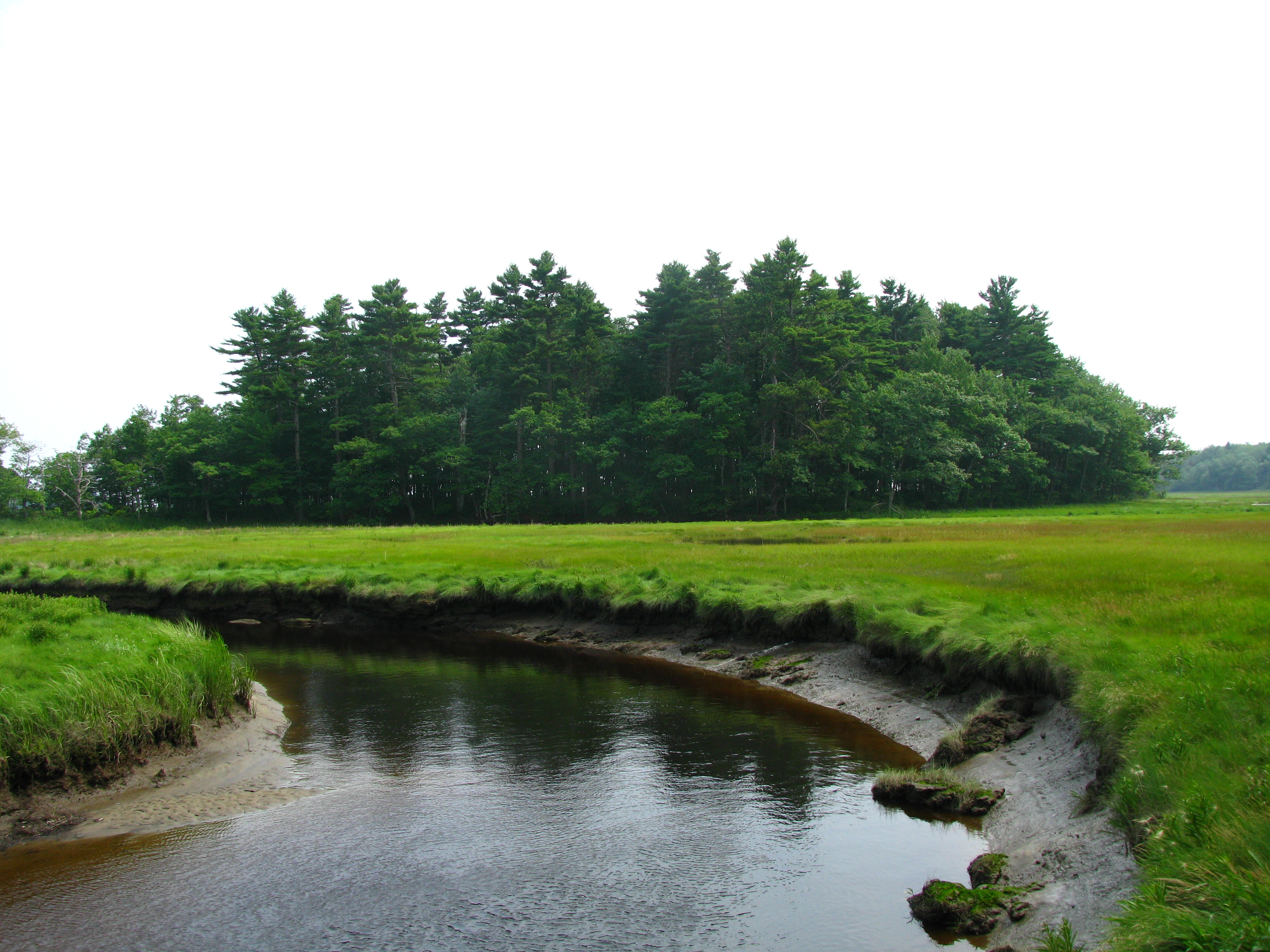
