= Webhannet River =

River in Wells, Maine, United States

Coordinates: 43°18′56″N 70°33′53″W

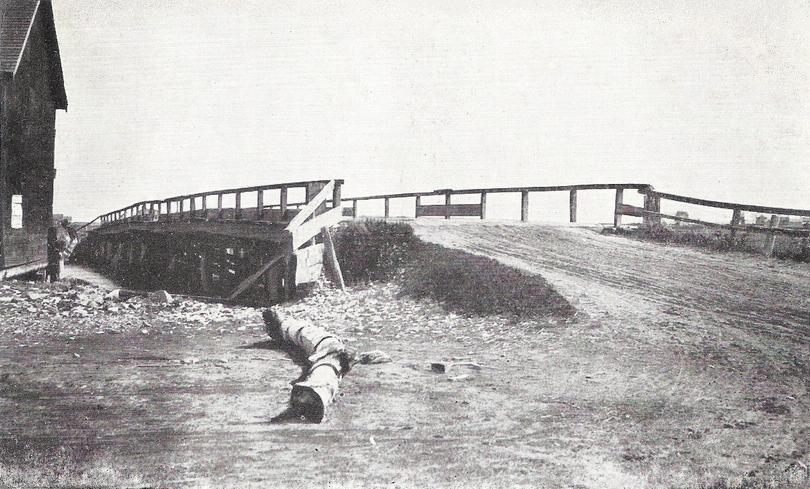
Bridge over the Webhannet River in 1920

The Webhannet River is an 8.3-mile-long (13.4 km) river whose 8,963-acre (36.27 km^{2}) watershed is contained entirely within the town of Wells, Maine.

The river has five tributaries, including three with official names: Pope’s Creek, Depot Brook, and Blacksmith Brook. Draining a sandy outwash plain left by the last glacier, they run parallel to the southern Maine coastline behind the heavily developed barrier beaches of Wells and Drakes Island. The river flows into Wells Harbor, then empties between a pair of jetties into the Gulf of Maine.

The Webhannet watershed includes 1,510 acres (6.1 km^{2}) of land under conservation, including 1,167 acres (4.72 km^{2}) of estuary salt marsh and uplands protected by the Rachel Carson National Wildlife Refuge.

== Jetties ==
In 1961-62, the U.S. Army Corps of Engineers built two rubble-mound jetties to protect the 8-foot-deep (2.4 m) channel to Wells Harbor. The north jetty was 580 feet (180 m) long, the south one 920 feet (280 m), and extended roughly from the inner harbor to just past the beaches. A 1-ft-thick bedding layer and core of 3-in. to 150 lb (68 kg) stone was covered with a double layer of stones weighing a minimum of two tons on the landward section and three tons on the seaward sections, for a total of 20,000 tons of stone. The cost for placing the stone was $95,600.

In 1962-63, the north jetty was extended 200 feet (61 m) seaward at a cost of $29,300.

In 1965, the north and south jetties were extended seaward 1,225 and 1,300 ft (400 m), respectively. The work required a total of 119,000 tons of stone and cost $594,600 ($6,074,715 today).

The extensions are parallel to one another, spaced 425 ft (130 m) apart, and terminate at a depth of eight feet below the low-water mark. Their height above low water ranges from 13 feet (4.0 m) on their seaward ends to 17 feet (5.2 m) (north jetty) and 16 feet (4.9 m) (south jetty) at their landward ends. Their flat crowns are 7 feet (2.1 m) wide at the seaward end and 5 feet (1.5 m) wide at the landward end.
