= Reggie Watts =

American comedian and musician (born 1972)

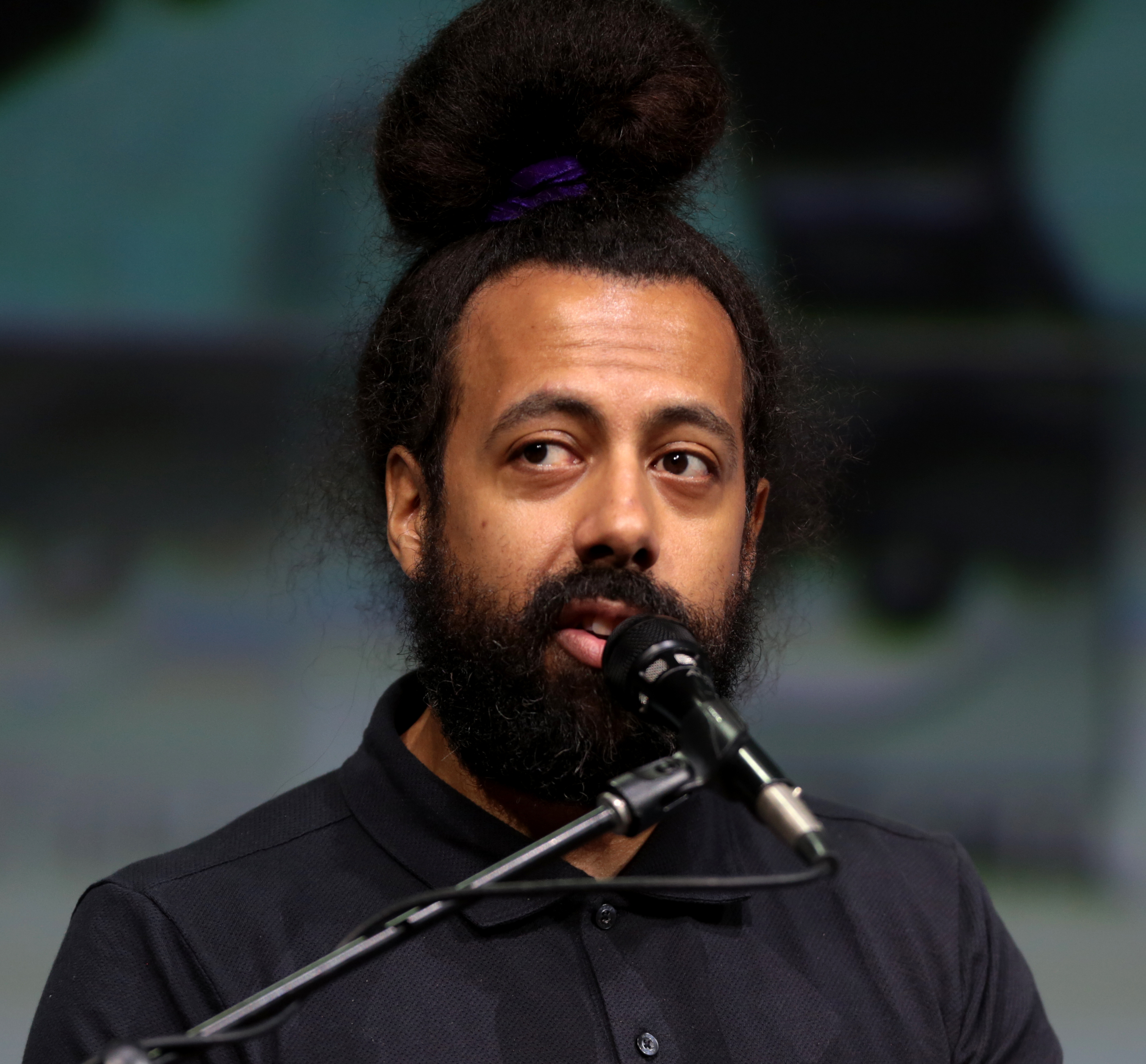
- Watts in July 2017

Background information
- Born: Reginald Lucien Frank Roger Watts; March 23, 1972 (age 54); Stuttgart, West Germany
- Origin: Great Falls, Montana, U.S.
- Genres: Alternative comedy; musical comedy; electronic; funk; soul
- Occupations: Comedian; musician; beatboxer; actor
- Instruments: Vocals; keyboards
- Years active: 1996–present

Reginald Lucien Frank Roger Watts (born March 23, 1972) is an American comedian, musician, beatboxer, and actor. He is known for improvised musical sets created using only his voice, a keyboard, and a looping machine. He was the regular house musician on the spoof IFC talk show Comedy Bang! Bang! and led the house band for The Late Late Show with James Corden from 2015 to 2023.

== Early life ==
Reginald Lucien Frank Roger Watts was born in Stuttgart (then in West Germany) on March 23, 1972, the son of Christiane and Charles Alphonso Watts. His mother is French and his father is African-American. His parents were in Germany due to his father's role as a master sergeant in the U.S. Air Force, which also led the family to live in France, Italy, and Spain before returning to the U.S. They settled in Great Falls, Montana, where Watts graduated from Great Falls High School in 1990. He began piano and violin lessons at the age of five, with his love of music beginning as a young child when he saw Ray Charles play the piano on television. He moved to Seattle at the age of 18 to study music, attending the Art Institute of Seattle before studying jazz at Cornish College of the Arts.

== Career ==
=== Early career (1996–2009) ===
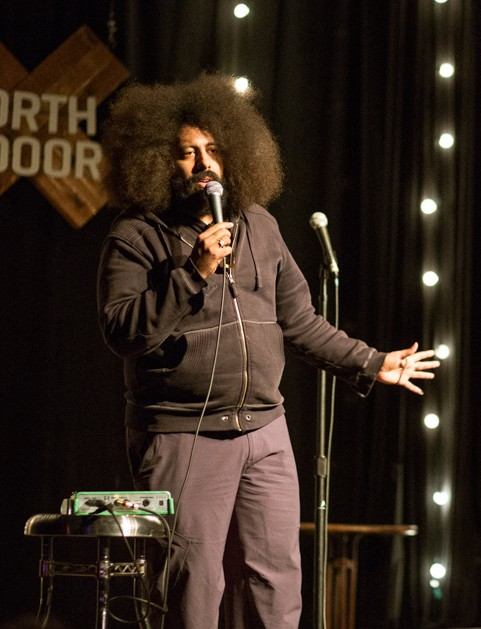
Watts performing in March 2013

In 1996, Watts became the frontman of the band Maktub. While recording and touring from 1996 to 2000 with Wayne Horvitz's 4+1 Ensemble as a keyboardist, he was forced to downsize his effects pedal from a Roland Space Echo tape delay to the smaller Line 6 DL4 delay modeler, making it easy to travel. He began using the DL4 in live shows with Maktub to replicate the duplicate harmonies from the recorded material. He experimented with improvising entire songs in solo acts with the DL4 while trying to sound like Tom Waits, playing initial gigs at small Seattle venues and artist bungalows. While in Seattle, he composed musical scores for dance choreographers and dabbled in sketch comedy with friend and future playwright Tommy Smith, who later ended their collaborative relationship when Watts did not credit him for co-writing the lyrics of his viral hits "Fuck Shit Stack" and "What About Blowjobs?"

In 2004, after recording five albums over eight years in Seattle, Watts moved to the Lower East Side of New York City. In 2005, he recorded his first solo single "So Beautiful". Inspired by the comedy group Stella and the film Wet Hot American Summer, he began infusing spontaneous comedic material with the beatbox-driven musical compositions. He also shot comedic shorts for CollegeHumor and Vimeo.

In 2007, Watts appeared on Plum TV's Scott Bateman Presents Scott Bateman Presents and starred in the CollegeHumor video What About Blowjobs? which became a viral hit. The same year, he also wrote and performed the theme song for Penelope Princess of Pets, a web comedy series featuring Kristen Schaal and H. Jon Benjamin. He additionally appeared on the 2007 album Turn My Teeth Up! by electro-funk group Baby Elephant (composed of Prince Paul and P-Funk keyboardist Bernie Worrell). In 2008, Watts recorded a new special entitled Disinformation, which features his performance at the Under the Radar Festival at the Public Theater. He also appeared in the independent film Steel of Fire Warriors 2010 A.D. as a Mutantzoid Underling and on an episode of Late Night with Jimmy Fallon, as well as making other various television appearances.

In 2009, Watts recorded his first solo EP, Pot Cookies. He also began appearing on the PBS Kids' children's program The Electric Company. He performed in his first solo short film Watts Does London and made a small appearance on Comedy Central's Michael and Michael Have Issues. He then did voice work for an episode of Adult Swim's The Venture Bros., Australia's Good News Week, and appeared in the U.S. documentary The Yes Men Fix the World. He also toured in support of Devo in a fall 2009 tour.

=== Why Shit So Crazy? (2010–2011) ===
In 2010, Watts recorded a comedy special called Why Shit So Crazy? The special features Watts performing at the New York venues Galapagos, The Bell House, and (Le) Poisson Rouge, bookended with brief sketches and a music video of Watts' "Fuck Shit Stack". Comedy Central aired Why Shit So Crazy? and released the film as a dual DVD/CD package. Watts then made various public appearances, including during Conan O'Brien's The Legally Prohibited from Being Funny on Television Tour.

=== A Live at Central Park (2012) ===
Watts's second stand-up special, A Live at Central Park, premiered on Comedy Central in the "Secret Stash" on May 12, 2012. It received positive reviews. The film was made available as a CD/DVD through Watts' official website and Comedy Central's online store. That same year, Watts performed a song with LCD Soundsystem on their documentary film Shut Up and Play the Hits and wrote and performed the outro music for Jim Gaffigan's stand-up special Mr. Universe.

=== Comedy Bang! Bang! (2012–2015) ===
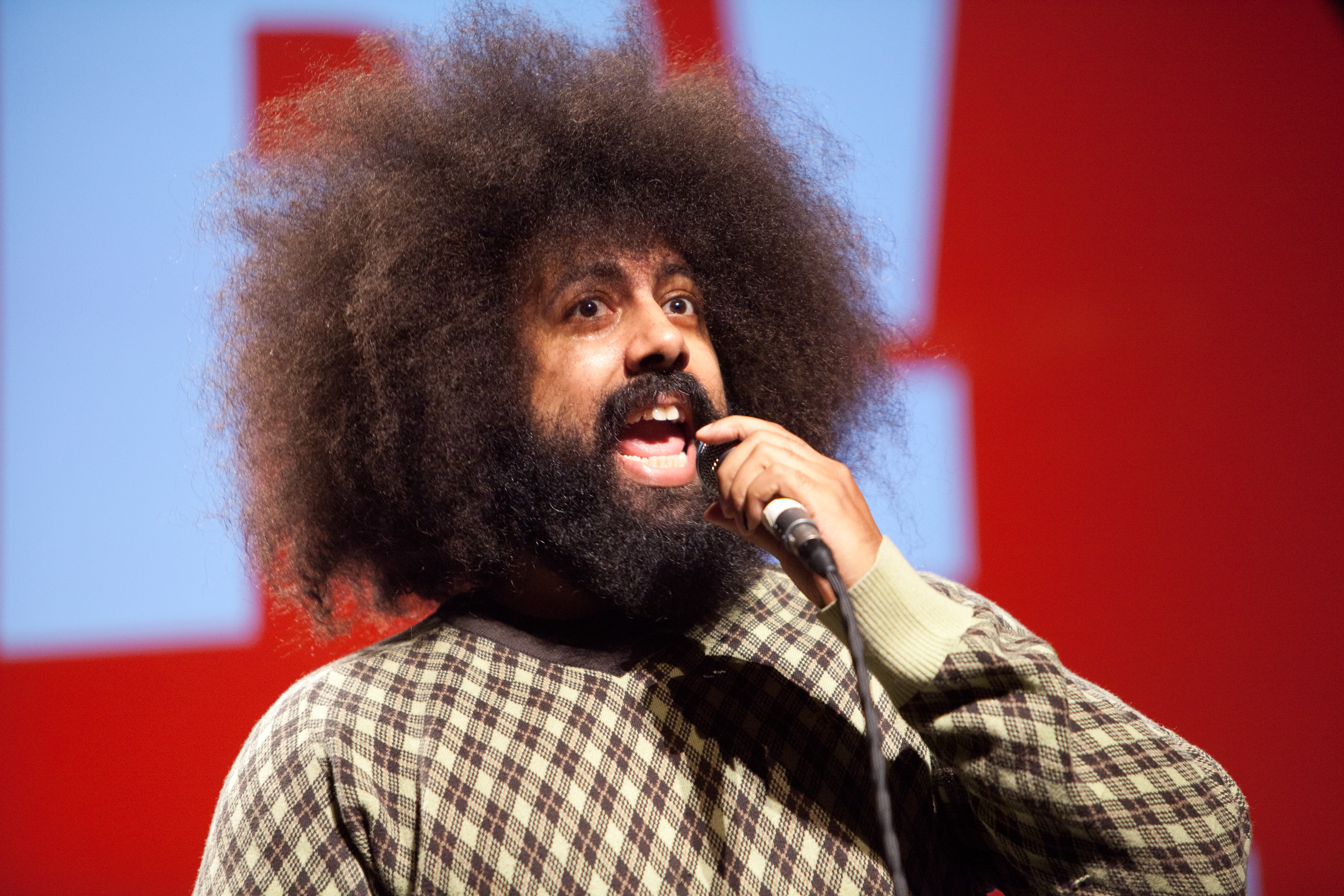
Watts at PopTech 2011

In 2012, Watts began starring opposite Scott Aukerman on the IFC series Comedy Bang! Bang! based on the podcast of the same name. That same year, Watts co-founded the comedy YouTube channel Jash with Michael Cera, Tim & Eric, and Sarah Silverman.

In 2013, Watts recorded a new special entitled Transition, which played at various arts festivals including the Under the Radar Festival at The Public Theater; it won the MAP Fund Award and Creative Capital Award. The same year, Watts was invited to perform at Yoko Ono's Meltdown festival in London's Southbank Centre, where he was supported by Mac Lethal.

In 2014, Watts contributed the outro vocal on "Holy City" and beatbox on the title track of the Joan As Police Woman album The Classic. He also appeared as the last act in the season 4 premiere of John Oliver's New York Stand-Up Show where he told some jokes and performed a song. In December 2014, following CBS's announcement that Watts would lead The Late Late Show band, Aukerman announced that Watts would leave Comedy Bang! Bang! after the first half of 2015. Watts' final episode of Comedy Bang! Bang! was on June 5, 2015.

=== The Late Late Show with James Corden and Spatial (2015–2023) ===
Watts served as the bandleader and announcer for The Late Late Show with James Corden for its entire run from 2015 to 2023. He described his role on the show as "a mix of Paul Shaffer and Andy Richter". His band on the show was unofficially named Karen, but in response to the rise of that name being used as an insult, the band was renamed Melissa. Watts had a slot on the show to ask a guest a question about anything called Reggie's Question. The questions were a continuation of his time on Comedy Bang! Bang! and followed his preference for surreal comedy in his stand-up act.

On December 6, 2016, Watts' Netflix special Spatial was released. It features a guest appearance from dancer Chloe Arnold and a one-off musical performance from a band consisting of Watts on vocals with Josh Homme on guitar.

In 2023, Watts released his autobiography Great Falls, MT; Fast Times, Post-Punk Weirdos, and a Tale of Coming Home Again. The audiobook, read by Watts, includes sounds and samples of his music.

== Performance style ==
Watts utilizes improvisation in his solo shows, which consist of him singing and rapping both with words and with sound poetry, accompanying himself by either beatboxing, performing vocal basslines into a loop machine, or simply by playing the keyboard. His act also showcases his trademark style of stand-up comedy, consisting of him rapidly alternating between topics of discussion in both rational and nonsensical manners, making random sounds and gibberish noises, and speaking in other accents and languages at unexpected times, all with the intent of playfully and comically disorienting his audiences. He referred to himself in 2015 as having a "disinformationist" style. He has a four-and-a-half octave vocal range.

== Personal life ==
Watts has spoken publicly about his use of cannabis and psychedelics since the 1990s, describing them as tools for self-exploration. By 2021, he had become a vocal advocate for ketamine, publicly encouraging concert audiences to seek prescriptions. Watts is a self-described psychonaut.

=== 2026 abuse allegations ===
In August 2026, Cheyenne Roundtree published an investigation for Rolling Stone into Watts' relationships, with friends and family of his former partner, Katherine McCollough, alleging that his persistent encouragement to use ketamine and other substances contributed to her addiction and psychosis, culminating in McCollough experiencing a manic episode, which Watts was recorded as instead describing as "a deeply spiritual moment" when friends intervened. The two broke up in October 2025. McCollough died by suicide alongside another suicidal man who she had met through a suicide assistance forum in March 2026. Five women who had previously dated Watts disclosed to Rolling Stone that he had encouraged unfettered use of psychedelics and deliriants in relationships. He was recorded as referring to it as "medicine". A ex-partner of Watts' prior to McCollough, given the name Claire in the Rolling Stone investigation, alleged that Watts had sexually assaulted her without a condom on, in spite of previously disclosing that he was carrying an STD.

Watts' attorney, Andrew Brettler, asserted in a statement that it was "dangerously false" to suggest that Watts was responsible for McCollough's death; Watts also echoed this.

== Filmography ==
=== Film ===
- Steel of Fire Warriors 2010 A.D. (2008) as Mutantzoid Underling in Bar
- The Yes Men Fix the World (2009) as himself
- Reggie Watts Does London (2009)
- Why Shit So Crazy? (2010) as himself
- Conan O'Brien Can't Stop (2011) as himself (cameo)
- Tell Your Friends! The Concert Film (2012) as himself
- Shut Up and Play the Hits (2012) as himself
- A Live at Central Park (2012) as himself
- Jim Gaffigan: Mr. Universe (composer)
- Transition (2013) as himself
- Pitch Perfect 2 (2015) as Tone Hanger Singer and Beatboxer
- Creative Control (2015) as himself
- My Entire High School Sinking into the Sea (2016) as Assaf (voice)
- Spatial (2016) as himself
- Keep in Touch (2016) as Dr. Harry Clark
- Duck Duck Goose (2018) as Carl (voice)
- Star Wars: The Rise of Skywalker (2019) as Additional voices
- The SpongeBob Movie: Sponge on the Run (2020) as Chancellor (voice)
- Extinct (2021) as Hoss (voice)

=== Television ===
- Scott Batemen Presents Scott Batemen Presents (2007) as himself
- Saving Steve Agee (2007) as himself
- Superjail! (2008) as Time-Police Member #1 (voice)
- Late Night with Jimmy Fallon (2009) as himself
- Made Here (2009) as himself
- The Ha!ifax Comedy Fest (2009) as himself
- The Venture Bros. (2009) as The Delivery Guy (voice)
- The Electric Company (2009–2011) as Music Man
- The Tonight Show with Conan O'Brien (2010) as himself
- Good News Week (2010) as himself
- Team Coco Presents the Conan Writers Live (2010) as himself
- Conan O'Brien Can't Stop (2011)
- Cracker Night (2011) as himself
- Mash Up (2011) as himself
- Talk Stoop (2011) as himself
- Funny as Hell (2011) as himself
- Doctor Who: The Best-of Specials (2011) as Host
- The Green Room with Paul Provenza (2011) as himself
- Delocated (2012) as himself
- Russell Howard's Good News (2012) as himself
- The Top 100 Video Games of All Time (2012) as himself
- 7 Minutes in Heaven (2012) as himself
- Stand Down: True Tales from Stand-Up Comedy (2012) as himself
- Mash Up (2012) as himself
- The Secret Policeman's Ball (2012) as himself
- Comedy Bang! Bang! (2012–2016) as himself
- Reggie Makes Music (2012–2013) as himself
- Totally Biased with W. Kamau Bell (2013) as himself
- Jimmy Kimmel Live! (2013) as himself
- 2013 YouTube Music Awards (2013) as Host
- America's Next Top Model (2013) as himself
- Inside Amy Schumer (2014) as Neighbor
- The Late Late Show with James Corden (2015–2023) as himself
- Adventure Time (2016–2017) as various voices
- The Mr. Peabody & Sherman Show (2017) as Rejgie (voice)
- Baroness von Sketch Show (2017) as himself
- Taskmaster (2018) as Taskmaster
- Tuca & Bertie (2019–2022) as Pastry Pete (voice)
- Ask the StoryBots (2019) as Bernard the Nurse (voice)
- HarmonQuest (2019) as Graildokt
- One Day at a Time (2020) as Mr. Mann
- Wild Life (2020) as Darby (voice)
- The Great North (2021–2023) as Quay (voice)
- History of the World, Part II (2023) as Hans
- Yo Gabba Gabbaland (2024) as Himself
- The Horne Section TV Show (2025) as himself

=== Internet videos ===
- CollegeHumor – "What About Blowjobs?" (2007)
- Jake Lodwick – "It's Over" (2007)
- Jake Lodwick – "The Beginning is Near" (2008)
- Disinformation (2008)
- bd – "I Just Want To" (2009)
- "Fuck Shit Stack" (2010)
- Pop!Tech – "Reggie Watts: Humor In Music" (2011)
- Pop!Tech – "Reggie Watts: A Send-Off In Style" (2011)
- Funny or Die – "Reggie Watts Live" (2012)
- TED – "Reggie Watts Disorients You in the Most Entertaining Way" (2012)
- "Reggie Watts Is Skrillex" (2012)
- Jash – Various Videos (2013–present)
- "Ian Up For Whatever" – Bud Light Super Bowl XLVIII ad (2014)
- "Brasilia: City of the Future" – Hispanglosaxon (Carolina Ravassa)
- Good Mythical Morning – "Which Musician Am I?" (2018)
- RIGHT NOW – "RIGHT NOW w/ John Goblikon S4 E2 (Reggie Watts)"
- Marti Fischer – "Impro mit REGGIE WATTS | Ein Loop zwischendurch"
- Reggie Watts @ The Lot Radio (June 26, 2017)
- CHILLING WITH ERYKAH AND REGGIE
- REGGIE WATTS AND FLYING LOTUS – Livestream with Marc Rebillet (2021)
- Actual play charity specials to support Extra Life:
  - Lost Odyssey: Last Light as Bronwyn (2021)
  - Lost Odyssey: Promised Gold as Bronwyn (2021)
  - Lost Odyssey: The Red Scribe as Bronwyn (2023)
  - Lost Odyssey: Godfall as Bronwyn (2025)
- The Try Guys – "I Smoke With Reggie Watts" (2024)
- Dropout - "Hal Rose Said to Watch This Episode", Crowd Control (2026)

=== Music videos ===
- "Fuck Shit Stack" by Duncan & Ben (2010)
- "Night and Day" by Hot Chip (2012)
- "Stop Desire" by Tegan and Sara (2016)
- "Move" by Saint Motel (2017)
- "Ask Yourself" by Panther Modern (2019)

=== Video games ===
- Accounting+
- Cartoon Network Journeys

== Discography ==
=== Solo albums ===
- Simplified (2003)
- Why Shit So Crazy? (2010)
- Live at Third Man – 12" Vinyl (2011)
- A Live at Central Park (2012)
- Spatial (2016)

=== Solo singles ===
- "So Beautiful" (2005)
- "Get Ready" (2014)

=== Collaborative albums ===
==== Maktub ====
- Subtle Ways (1999)
- Khronos (2002/2003)
- Say What You Mean (2005)
- Start It Over (2007)
- Five (2009)

==== 4 + 1 Ensemble ====
- 4+1 Ensemble (Intuition, 1996)
- From a Window (Avant, 2000)

==== Wajatta ====
- Casual High Technology (Comedy Dynamics, 2018)
- Don't Let Get You Down (Brainfeeder, 2020)

==== Spelljams ====
- "Space Is A Place" (Kill Rock Stars, 2022)

=== Collaborative songs ===
- "Closer" [Brent Laurence feat. Reggie Watts] (2004)
- "Tears" [Linkwood] (2009)
- "Dance Anthem of the 80's" [Regina Spektor] (2012)
- "Spaghetti Circus" [Still Going feat. Reggie Watts] (2012)
- "Drunk Texts to Myself" Trevor Moore feat. Reggie Watts] (2013)
- "We Got A Love" [Shit Robot feat. Reggie Watts] (2013)
- "Bassface" The Midnight Beast feat. Reggie Watts (2014)
- "MFN" / "Housekeeping" Cibo Matto, Hotel Valentine (2014)
- "Holy City" / "The Classic" Joan as Police Woman (2014)
- "Sunshine" Flight Facilities (2014)
- "Trumpy Trump" The Cooties (2016)
- "There Should Be Unicorns" Oczy Mlody, The Flaming Lips, (2017)
- "Captain Crunch" Czarface Meets Metal Face, Czarface & MF Doom (2018)
- "Stranded" Flight Facilities (2018)
- "Daddi (Reggie Watts Remix)" Cherry Glazerr (2019)
- "OATMILK" (with Chelsea Peretti) (2020)

== Awards and honors ==
Watts is the winner of the 2005 Malcolm Hardee "Oy Oy" Award, the 2006 Andy Kaufman Comedy Award, and the 2006 Seattle Mayor's Arts Award. He was also awarded the 2008 MAP Fund and the 2009 Creative Capitol Grant for the performing arts, and won the 2009 ECNY Award for Best Musical Comedy Act.
