= The Jim Gaffigan Show =

American TV series 2015-2016

- Genre: Sitcom
- Created by: Jim Gaffigan; Peter Tolan
- Starring: Jim Gaffigan; Ashley Williams; Michael Ian Black; Tongayi Chirisa; Caitlin Moeller; Adam Goldberg
- Composers: Chris Allen Lee; Reggie Watts
- Country of origin: United States
- Original language: English
- No. of seasons: 2
- No. of episodes: 23

Production
- Executive producers: Jeannie Gaffigan; Jim Gaffigan; Alex Murray; Sandy Wernick; Jeff Lowell; Peter Tolan
- Producer: David Bausch
- Camera setup: Single-camera
- Running time: 22 minutes
- Production companies: Fedora Entertainment (2015) (season 1); Brillstein Entertainment Partners; Burrow Owl Productions; Jax Media; Chimichanga Productions, Inc.; Sony Pictures Television; TV Land Original Productions

Original release
- Network: TV Land
- Release: July 15, 2015 – August 21, 2016

The Jim Gaffigan Show is an American sitcom written and executive produced by comedian Jim Gaffigan and his wife Jeannie Gaffigan. Gaffigan stars as a fictionalized version of himself as a stand-up comedian raising five children in a two-bedroom New York City apartment. An 11-episode first season debuted on July 15, 2015, on TV Land. On August 31, 2015, TV Land renewed the series for a 12-episode second season, which premiered on June 19, 2016. On August 22, 2016, Jim and Jeannie Gaffigan announced that the series would not be returning for a third season so they could spend more time with their kids. As of 2021, the whole series is available to watch on streaming apps PlutoTV and Paramount+.

== Cast ==
- Jim Gaffigan as a fictionalized version of himself
- Ashley Williams as Jeannie Gaffigan, Jim's wife
- Michael Ian Black as Daniel Benjamin, Jeannie's confidante
- Adam Goldberg as Dave Marks, Jim's best friend, who is a struggling comedian
- Tongayi Chirisa as Father Nicholas, the rector at Jim and Jeannie's church
- Vanessa Aspillaga as Blanca, the nanny of Jim and Jeannie's kids
- Caitlin Moeller as Elizabeth Gaffigan

Comedians Dave Attell, Hannibal Buress, Bill Burr, Whitney Cummings, Will Ferrell, Esther Ku, John Mulaney, Jim Norton, and Chris Rock; political personality Joe Scarborough; TV personality Jimmy Fallon; and actors Alec Baldwin, Matthew Broderick, Steve Buscemi, and Nathan Lane make guest appearances as fictionalized versions of themselves. Macaulay Culkin makes multiple cameo appearances as himself holding different low-income jobs and appearing on The Tonight Show Starring Jimmy Fallon.

== Production ==
=== Development ===
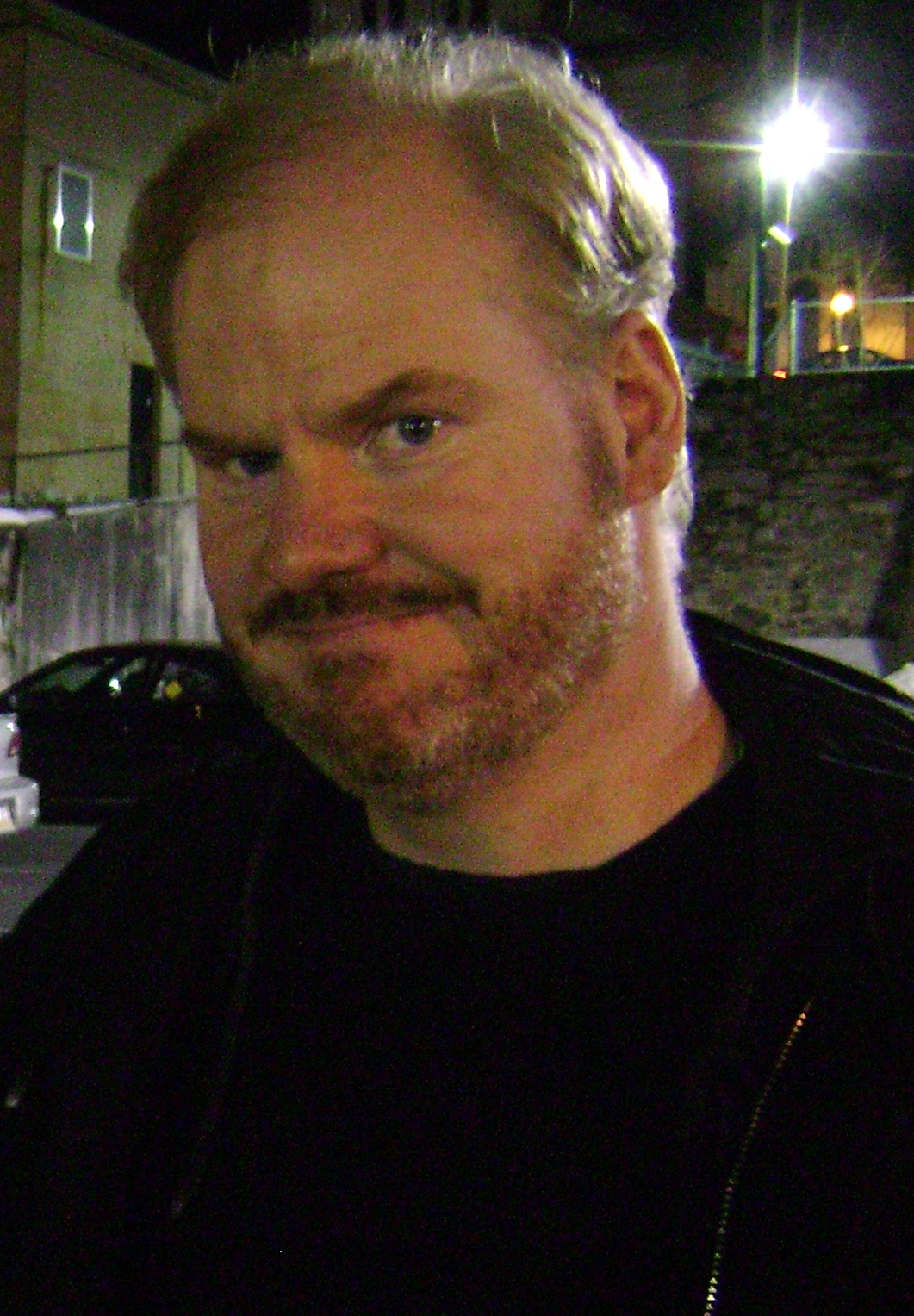
Comedian Jim Gaffigan cowrote, executive produced, and starred in the semi-autobiographical series.

NBC first showed interest in the show, but eventually passed. CBS previously tried twice to develop Jim Gaffigan's semi-autobiographical series. While still in talks with NBC, Jeannie would have played herself in the show, however CBS decided to cast someone—a decision she agreed with—and she joined in casting the role. The network ordered a pilot episode in January 2013, at which time Mira Sorvino was attached to play Gaffigan's wife, with Christian Barillas and Tongayi Chirisa in supporting roles. CBS passed on the series in May 2013 and instead planned to redevelop it for the 2014-15 television season. The series was recast with new cast members Williams, Goldberg and Black. CBS passed on the series in May 2014, and Sony Pictures Television began shopping it to other networks. It was announced in July 2014 that TV Land had ordered the series and, unlike previous networks, granted the Gaffigans full creative control. Jim Gaffigan said of the announcement, "I am thrilled that TV Land is giving us this opportunity to do this show that Peter, Jeannie and I have been fine-tuning for three years." TV Land president Larry W. Jones said the series was perfect for its target audience of Generation Xers who are raising families. Jones said, "We love Jim Gaffigan's brand of humor. The second we saw this show we knew we wanted it on TV Land."

=== Writing ===
The series is partially based on the real lives of Jim and Jeannie Gaffigan, who have five children and lived in a two-bedroom apartment in New York City. The age differences between the children were shortened for the television show, and Jeannie said, "The TV kids are sort of a snapshot of an earlier time in our lives when they were all younger". Episodes are built around actual incidents they've experienced. Other regular topics of Jim Gaffigan's stand-up comedy are part of the series, particularly his love of food. Jeannie said the list of props for the show is "almost 90 percent food ... which I thought was pretty funny".

Although Jim plays a comedian, a conscious decision was made not to regularly intersperse the narrative with his stand-up comedy, like in such popular shows as Seinfeld and Louie. He said of this decision: "I want this to be more about what happens off the stage. ... 'Stand-up comedian' is an occupation and, like our pilot, we're evolving into a much more mature show." Jim Gaffigan and Peter Tolan wrote the pilot together. The rest of the series is written by Jim and his wife Jeannie.

=== Crew ===
Jeff Lowell was the showrunner for Season 1 of The Jim Gaffigan Show and served as an executive producer along with Jim and Jeannie Gaffigan, Jim's real-life wife, a fictional version of whom also appeared on the show. Jeannie took over the showrunner position for Season 2. Alex Murray and Sandy Wernick were also executive producers.

=== Filming ===
Production on the single-camera series began in 2015. Filming occurred at such New York City locations as Katz's Delicatessen and the Gotham Comedy Club. The set is an exact replica of their former apartment, set on a soundstage.

== Broadcast ==
Comedy Central, a cable network owned by TV Land parent company Viacom, aired episodes of the series one week after they debuted. New episodes were simulcast on Nick at Nite. Episodes are available on video on demand on cable outlets and for streaming on Hulu (with a paid subscription) three weeks after airing on TV Land.

In Canada, The Jim Gaffigan Show aired on The Comedy Network. The show debuted on the network on December 1, 2015.

== Reception ==
Early critical reviews were largely positive, with mixed comparisons to the show Louie. Grading the show with an "A", Diane Werts with Newsday called the show "This summer's must-see comedy smash," adding, "I can't remember laughing out loud so consistently at a situation comedy maybe, um, ever." In an overall favorable review, The New York Times called the show "quite funny." TV critic Ken Tucker said the show "gets better with each episode." Some critics found the show too sterile. The Hollywood Reporter said "Gaffigan's good-naturedness is pleasant, if not particularly interesting." Entertainment Weekly, giving the show a "B−", said it was mostly "stray one-liners and stilted semi-riffs. Imagine a less nourishing Louie or Curb Your Enthusiasm." The Washington Post remarked that, while "Gaffigan has perfected his shtick...It works as a stage presence, but not so much as a TV character."

== Ending ==
Despite an overall positive critical reception, Jim and Jeannie decided not to pursue a third season. In a statement released on Jim Gaffigan's Twitter, he announced that "the time commitment to make the quality of show we wanted was taking us away from our most important project, our five children."

== Episodes ==
=== Series overview ===
Season	Episodes	Originally released	
Season	Episodes	First released	Last released
1	11	July 15, 2015	September 23, 2015
2	12	June 19, 2016	August 21, 2016

=== Season 1 (2015) ===
No. overall	No. in season	Title	Directed by	Written by	Original release date	Prod. code	US viewers (millions)
1	1	"Pilot"	Seth Gordon	Jim Gaffigan & Peter Tolan	July 15, 2015	101	1.58
Jim decides if he should get a vasectomy after his wife has a pregnancy scare. Guest appearance: Fred Armisen
2	2	"Red Velvet If You Please"	Steven K. Tsuchida	Jim Gaffigan & Jeannie Gaffigan	July 22, 2015	109	1.47
Jim tries to cut back on eating junk food.
3	3	"A Night at the Plaza"	Peter Lauer	Jim Gaffigan & Jeannie Gaffigan	July 29, 2015	106	1.29
Jim tries to have a romantic evening to celebrate their anniversary.
4	4	"In the Name of the Father"	Todd Biermann	Jim Gaffigan & Jeannie Gaffigan	August 5, 2015	104	1.16
Jim and Jeannie have dinner with Daniel and his father—who have a tense relationship. Dave later joins them for a crazy night out. Guest appearance: Dave Attell
5	5	"Super Great Daddy Day"	Steven K. Tsuchida	Jim Gaffigan & Jeannie Gaffigan	August 12, 2015	102	1.32
Jim tries to help run some errands and spend time with the kids. Guest appearance: Macaulay Culkin
6	6	"Go Shorty, It's Your Birthday"	Peter Lauer	Jim Gaffigan & Jeannie Gaffigan	August 19, 2015	108	1.28
Jeannie gets upset when, after telling Jim that he doesn't have to celebrate her birthday, he celebrates Dave's birthday instead. Guest appearances: Macaulay Culkin, Dave Attell, Colin Quinn, Artie Lange, Tom Papa, Eddie Pepitone, Aparna Nancherla, Morgan Murphy, Bonnie McFarlane, Rich Vos, Damien Lemon, James Adomian
7	7	"My Friend the Priest"	Steven K. Tsuchida	Jim Gaffigan & Jeannie Gaffigan	August 26, 2015	110	1.18
Jeannie invites Father Nicholas to Jim's performance on The Tonight Show Starring Jimmy Fallon, which frustrates Jim. Guest appearances: Jimmy Fallon, Questlove, Macaulay Culkin, Bill Burr, Judah Friedlander, A.D. Miles
8	8	"Superdad"	Peter Lauer	Jim Gaffigan & Jeannie Gaffigan	September 2, 2015	107	0.571
Jeannie becomes irritated when a magazine article featuring Jim doesn't mention her. Guest appearance: Alexandra Wentworth
9	9	"The Bible Story"	Steven K. Tsuchida	Jim Gaffigan & Jeannie Gaffigan	September 9, 2015	103	1.10
Jim has some issues regarding the Bible. In the end, it was all a dream. Guest appearances: Chris Rock, Jon Stewart, Lea DeLaria, H. Jon Benjamin, Rachel Maddow, Lawrence O'Donnell, Jim Cramer, Lewis Dodley, María Celeste Arrarás, Don Lemon, Keith Olbermann, Nancy Grace, Jake Tapper, Mika Brzezinski, Joe Scarborough, Glenn Beck, Judy Gold, Lizz Winstead
10	10	"Maria"	Todd Biermann	Jim Gaffigan & Jeannie Gaffigan	September 16, 2015	105	1.12
Jeannie's younger sister, Maria, comes to New York for a massage therapy course. Jim and Jeannie conspire to keep Dave from dating her, but when the two arrange a date anyway, they decide to spy on them. Guest appearances: Mariska Hargitay, Hannibal Burress, Macaulay Culkin, Esther Ku
11	11	"Wonderful"	Steven K. Tsuchida	Jeannie Gaffigan & Jim Gaffigan	September 23, 2015	111	1.12
After getting frustrated with sick, lice-infested children, Jim wishes that he never got married and became a father. Guest appearances: Steve Buscemi, Matthew Broderick, Nathan Lane, Alec Baldwin, Macaulay Culkin, John Mulaney, Whitney Cummings, Gilbert Gottfried, Jeannie Gaffigan

=== Season 2 (2016) ===
No. overall	No. in season	Title	Directed by	Written by	Original release date	Prod. code	US viewers (millions)
12	1	"The Calling"	Peter Lauer	Jeannie Gaffigan & Jim Gaffigan	June 19, 2016	203	0.471
After learning that Father Nicholas was a star soccer player in Zimbabwe and a graduate of the London School of Business before getting "the calling" to be a priest, Jim wonders if he will ever get called to do something more impactful than just his comedy. Guest appearances: Jerry Seinfeld, Macaulay Culkin, Timothy M. Dolan
13	2	"The Trial"	Peter Lauer	Jeannie Gaffigan & Jim Gaffigan	June 19, 2016	201	0.343
Negative backlash from a tweet that some women found to be insensitive lands Jim in a literal "court of public opinion". Guest appearances: Zachary Quinto, Carrot Top, Raven-Symoné, Perez Hilton, Judy Gold, Adrian Martinez, Gilbert Gottfried, Artie Lange, Chad Kroeger, Ryan Peake, Mike Kroeger, Daniel Adair, Monroe Martin
14	3	"Ugly"	Peter Lauer	Jeannie Gaffigan & Jim Gaffigan	June 26, 2016	202	0.453
Jim is excited to be considered for the colead in a movie with Alec Baldwin, only to find that he's being cast as a character named "Ugly". Guest appearances: Alec Baldwin, John Mulaney, Tyler Oakley, Lewis Dodley, Tig Notaro
15	4	"The List"	Steven Tsuchida	Jeannie Gaffigan & Jim Gaffigan	July 3, 2016	204	0.466
A blogger posts a list of the Top 100 comedians in New York City, and Jim isn't on it, causing Jeannie to track down the blogger while Jim tries to figure out how to get on the list. Guest appearances: Christian Finnegan, Pete Davidson, Dave Attell, Greer Barnes, Todd Barry, Dave Hill, Colin Quinn
16	5	"No Good Deed Part 1"	Stuart McDonald	Jeannie Gaffigan & Jim Gaffigan	July 10, 2016	207	0.373
Jim has landed a monthly show at Caroline's in NYC and feels pressured to drop his preferred opening act and use Dave. In a parody of The Jim Gaffigan Show itself, Dave selfishly invites TV Land executives to see his set, and manages to drum up interest in a pseudo-reality show depicting his life in comedy. Guest appearances: Christian Finnegan, Jim Norton, Gregg Hughes
17	6	"No Good Deed Part 2"	Stuart McDonald	Jeannie Gaffigan & Jim Gaffigan	July 17, 2016	208	0.451
Dave has chosen John Mulaney to be his cowriter for the TV Land pilot, annoying Jim, but Jim soon gets a call from Will Ferrell and hopes to pitch a TV series idea to the comic icon. Will likes Jim's idea but says he first needs help on a TV Land show he's producing (Dave's show). Ferrell then steals the original idea Jim pitched and offers it back to Dave. Guest appearances: Will Ferrell, John Mulaney, Chris Hardwick
18	7	"No Good Deed Part 3"	Stuart McDonald	Jeannie Gaffigan & Jim Gaffigan	July 24, 2016	209	0.443
Jim has to audition to play himself on Dave's TV show. Mulaney quits, and Dave has to come up with scripts for a morning read-through, so he asks Jim for help. Jim encourages Dave to write about what he knows, and Dave does, to ridiculous extremes. The read-through goes badly, Will Ferrell is accused of going off his meds, and TV Land passes on the show. Guest appearances: Will Ferrell, John Mulaney, Kelly Ripa, Macaulay Culkin, Jon Ryan, Mario Batali, Kurt Braunohler, Jeannie Gaffigan
19	8	"He Said She Said"	Steven Tsuchida	Jeannie Gaffigan & Jim Gaffigan	July 31, 2016	205	0.470
Jim and Jeannie visit Father Nicholas for marriage counseling. After each gives their own version of a recent argument that seems to center on Jim's refusal to rent a storage space, it becomes clear that the real disagreement is over having a sixth child. Guest appearance: Macaulay Culkin
20	9	"My Brother's Keeper"	Steven Tsuchida	Jeannie Gaffigan & Jim Gaffigan	August 7, 2016	211	0.470
Jim's older brother Mitch comes to town, claiming he's tired of the banking business and wants to try his hand at stand-up comedy. Jeannie is convinced Mitch is there because he's getting a divorce. Guest appearance: Andy Richter, Jack Gaffigan, Marre Gaffigan
21	10	"Jim at the Museum"	Steven Tsuchida	Jeannie Gaffigan & Jim Gaffigan	August 14, 2016	206	0.490
When Jeannie has her dentist appointment rescheduled for a Saturday, Jim takes all five kids on a planned trip to the American Museum of Natural History by himself, with disastrous results. Guest appearance: Neil DeGrasse Tyson
22	11	"Bosom Buddies"	Steven Tsuchida	Jeannie Gaffigan & Jim Gaffigan	August 21, 2016	210	0.442
With Jeannie taking the kids out of town for a family wedding, Jim is looking forward to hanging around the apartment eating and not doing much else. But his weekend is spoiled by the arrival of Daniel, who is despondent over catching his latest boyfriend cheating. Guest appearances: Malcolm Gladwell, Jay Oakerson, Doug Benson, Luis J. Gomez, Mia Alvar, Rivka Galchen, Calvin Trillin, Kelefa Sanneh
23	12	"The Mike Gaffigan Show"	Jeannie Gaffigan	Jeannie Gaffigan & Jim Gaffigan	August 21, 2016	212	0.407
When a thunderstorm has the kids too scared to sleep, Jim tells them a story about life with his stern father and a time when a tornado threatened his family's home in Indiana. Guest appearances: Jeannie Gaffigan, Jack Gaffigan, Marre Gaffigan
