= Jeannie Gaffigan =

American writer, producer, and actress

- Born: Jeannie Louise Noth; 1970 (age 55–56); Milwaukee, Wisconsin, U.S.
- Education: Marquette University
- Occupations: Writer; producer; actress
- Years active: 1990s–present
- Known for: The Jim Gaffigan Show
- Spouse: Jim Gaffigan (m. 2003)
- Children: 5

Jeannie Louise Gaffigan (née Noth) is an American writer, producer, and actress. She is best known as a writer and executive producer for The Jim Gaffigan Show, a show loosely based on her own family life with her husband, Jim Gaffigan.

== Early life ==
Gaffigan was born in 1970, in Milwaukee, Wisconsin, as Jeanne Louise Noth. She grew up the oldest of nine children. Her father was a theater and film critic for the Milwaukee Journal. She graduated from Marquette University's Diederich College of Communication in 1992.

== Career ==
Gaffigan began her career as a stage actress in regional theater and upon moving to New York, performed in sketch comedy groups and small theater companies where playwrights developed original plays. Gaffigan founded the not-for-profit theater company Shakespeare on the Playground, dedicated to teaching literacy and production to urban youth through the performance of full Shakespearean plays. She began writing and producing comedy with her friend and future husband Jim Gaffigan. Since then, Gaffigan has helped write and produce all five of Jim's comedy specials, also serving as the director of his fifth special.

Gaffigan co-wrote an animated series called Pale Force, starring Jim Gaffigan and Conan O'Brien, for which she received an Emmy Nomination. She worked on it with her brothers Paul Noth, a New Yorker cartoonist, and Patrick Noth, a comedy writer and composer.

In 2013, Gaffigan began developing a pilot with her husband titled The Jim Gaffigan Show. After working with NBC and CBS, the show landed at TV Land where Gaffigan co-wrote and executive produced all 22 episodes with Jim. She directed the finale episode of Season 2. In August 2016, Jim and Jeannie decided not to continue with Season 3 of the show so they could spend more time with their family.

In July 2015, the Gaffigans appeared on the NPR program Ask Me Another, where Gaffigan played a version of the Newlywed Game; she got all the answers right.

Since April 8, 2016, Gaffigan has appeared in a marketing campaign for the 2017 Chrysler Pacifica starring Jim Gaffigan and the couple's children.

In March 2016, she received a Christopher Award for the Season 1 episode of The Jim Gaffigan Show, "My Friend the Priest". She also received the Eloquentia Perfecta award from Fordham University for her work in Television and Media.

In May 2016, the Gaffigans delivered the commencement address at the Catholic University of America. The Gaffigans also delivered the commencement address at Gaffigan's alma mater Marquette University on May 20, 2018. They were both awarded an honorary Doctor of Humane Letters degree as part of the graduation ceremony.

In June 2018, the Gaffigans released a short video written and directed by Gaffigan, starring Jim, Marre, Jack, Katie, Michael, and Patrick Gaffigan called A Short Film by @JeannieGaffigan.

== Personal life ==
Gaffigan started dating Jim Gaffigan in 2000 after they had met in New York. They were married at St. Patrick's Old Cathedral in New York on July 26, 2003. Together, they have two daughters and three sons. The couple chose home births for all five children. The family lives in Manhattan. Gaffigan is Catholic and Jim has jokingly referred to her as a "Shiite Catholic" relative to him.

On April 14, 2017, Gaffigan was diagnosed with a benign brain tumor known as papilloma of the choroid plexus. The tumor was the size of a pear, and was successfully removed in a nine-hour surgery at Manhattan's Mount Sinai Hospital. Gaffigan's left vocal fold remained paralyzed, and she underwent type 1 thyroplasty to restore her voice in 2019.

Gaffigan wrote a book about her diagnosis, her recovery, and the life lessons she learned from this experience. When Life Gives You Pears: The Healing Power of Family, Faith, and Funny People was published on October 1, 2019.
