= King Baby =

King Baby may refer to:

- King Baby (album), by comedian Jim Gaffigan
- "King Baby", an episode of CSI: Crime Scene Investigation
- King Baby, a book by Kate Beaton
