= Beyond the Pale (Jim Gaffigan album) =

Live album by Jim Gaffigan
- Released: February 7, 2006
- Recorded: October 8, 2005 at The Vic Theatre in Lake View, Chicago, Illinois
- Genre: Comedy
- Length: 55:32
- Label: Comedy Central Records
- Producers: Jeannie Noah Gaffigan, John MacDonald & Alex Murray, Jack Vaughn Jr. (executive producer)

Jim Gaffigan chronology
Doing My Time (2004)	Beyond the Pale (2006)	King Baby (2009)

DVD Cover
- Cover for the DVD release

Professional ratings
Review scores
Source	Rating
AllMusic	3.5/5 stars
Exclaim!	8/10

Beyond the Pale is the sixth album released by American stand-up comedian Jim Gaffigan. It is best known for its "Hot Pockets" riff.

== CD Release ==
The album was released on February 7, 2006, by Comedy Central Records, and was also released with the same title on DVD. The album was recorded at The Vic Theater in Lakeview, Chicago, Illinois. It peaked at #34 on the Billboard Independent Albums chart.

=== CD Track listing ===
1. Opening
2. I Love Food
3. Packaging
4. The Grocery Store
5. Eat Like an American
6. Fast Food
7. Delivery
8. Spray Cheese
9. The Case Against Cinnabons
10. Dessert
11. Cake
12. Holidays
13. Presents
14. Eat Vegetarian
15. Steak and Salad
16. Eat Healthy
17. Hot Pockets
18. Weird
19. Catholic
20. Heaven
21. Jesus, Mary and Joseph

== DVD release ==
The special was also released on DVD, being the first Gaffigan stand-up performance available on home video. In addition to the main act, the DVD also contains over 30 minutes of bonus footage.

=== DVD Chapter Listing ===
1. Pre-Showtime Ritual
2. Opening
3. Love Food
4. Packaging *
5. Grocery Store *
6. Eat Like Americans
7. Fast Food *
8. Delivery
9. Cheese *
10. Cinnabon *
11. Dessert
12. Cake
13. Holidays
14. Presents
15. Eating Out *
16. Vegetarian
17. Steak N Salad *
18. Eat Healthy *
19. Hot Pockets
20. Film Director
21. Do Nothing *
22. Email *
23. Weird *
24. Catholic
25. Heaven
26. Jesus, Mary and Joseph
- *Not on TV special

=== DVD bonus features ===
1. Mr. Chicago – Jim tours Chicago on day of his DVD taping.
2. Eat Dinner with Jim – Enjoy a hot pocket with Jim.
3. First Stand Up Performance [01.27.91] – See Jim sweat!
4. How to Break Into Stand-Up Comedy – Jim plays a character with all the answers.
5. A Short Cartoon of Jim.
6. Jim Makes the News
