= The Vic Theatre =

Music venue in Chicago, Illinois, US

Coordinates: 41.9395°N 87.6538°W

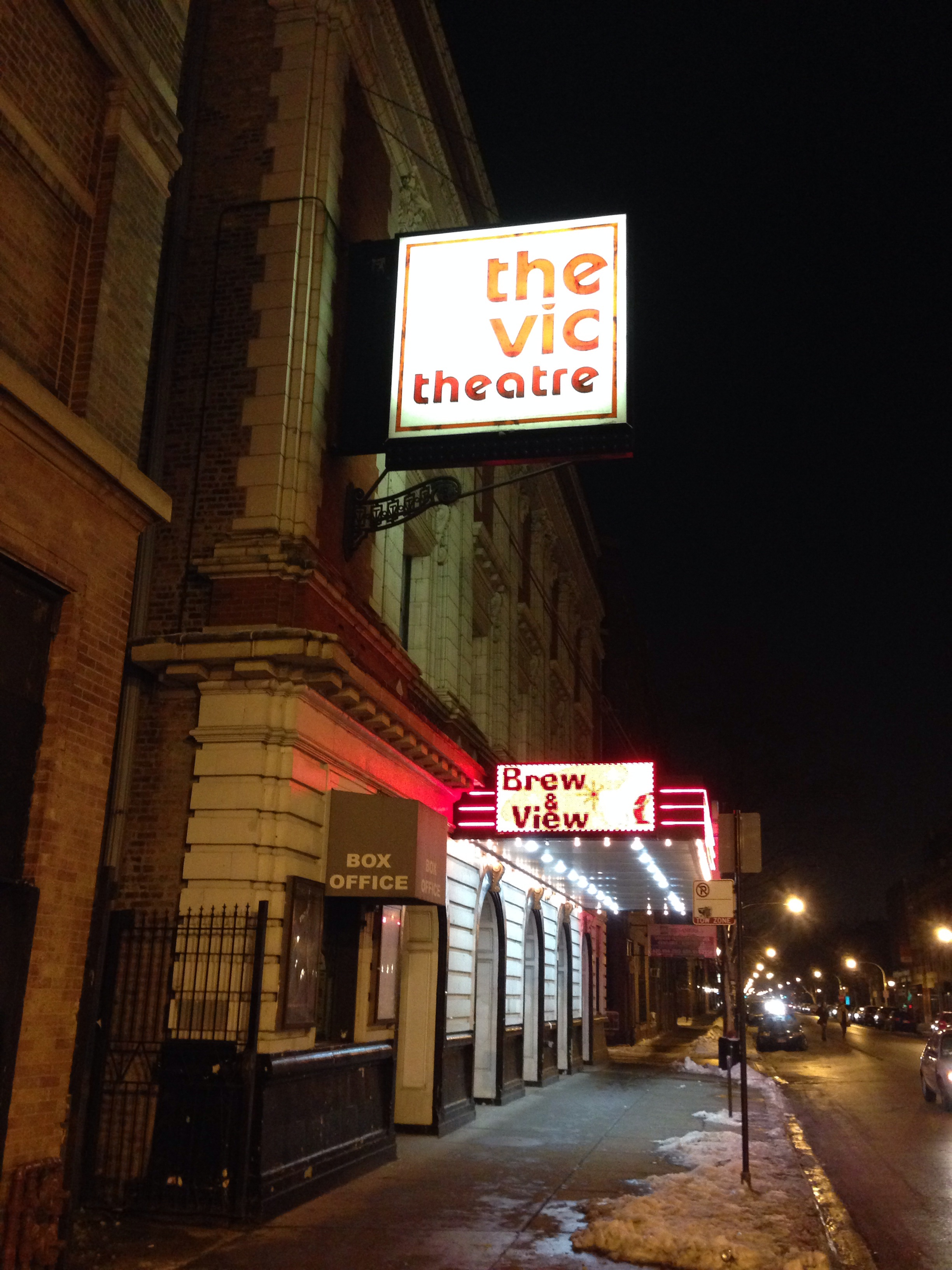
- Interactive map of The Vic Theatre
- Former names: Victoria Theatre
- Address: 3145 N. Sheffield Ave.
- Location: Chicago, Illinois
- Owner: Jam Productions
- Capacity: 1,400
- Public transit: Red Brown Purple at Belmont

Construction
- Opened: 1912
- Renovated: 1983 By Walter Klein & Big Bob Suszynski

Website
- www.victheater.com

The Vic Theatre is a music venue located in Chicago, Illinois. Vic Theatre can easily accommodate 1,400 people or with a seated capacity of 1,000.

== History ==
Vic Theatre, designed by architect John Eberson, opened in 1912 as the Victoria Theatre. It took three years to build the luxurious five-story Vaudeville house. The theatre was owned and built by Robert E. Ricksen and Frank Gazzolo. Ricksen and Gazzolo operated the Crown and Imperial theaters as well. Costing $300,000 to construct it was equipped with every luxury. (Source: September 14, 1912 Billboard publication)

In 1983 The Vic was purchased by Walt Klein who spent several million restoring it. Opening with the 20th Anniversary of Second City and recorded for broadcast by HBO The Vic was originally programmed by Lou Valpano and Celebration Flipside. Within a year programming was handled by Dave Frey, who brought in Holiday Star Theater as a partner.

In 1986 Walt and his team brought in Thunderdome Enterprises to handle day-to-day operations and bring the popular ClubLand nightclub to extend the venue's operating hours. During this period concert booking and promotions were moved to Jam Productions. In 1988 Michael Butler produced the 20th anniversary revival of "Hair" at the Vic. In 1990 ClubLand closed, and Thunderdome Enterprises reconcepted the nightclub into the short-lived Catwalk. In the mid-1990's, Brew & View was established at the Vic, offering movies and drinks on non-concert nights. Later, Walt sold The Vic to Jam Productions.

== Some notable performances ==
Please add in ascending order by date

- The Residents at the Vic on February 7, 1986.
- The Replacements at the Vic on April 11, 1986.
- Trouble Funk Red Hot Chili Peppers Beastie Boys at the Vic on January 4, 1987.
- In November 1988, Michael Butler produced the musical Hair at the Vic Theater to celebrate the shows' 20th anniversary. The production ran until February 1989.
- Gymboree taped their home video Parachute Express Live in Concert at the Vic in 1989.
- Todd Rundgren performed two nights March 2–3, 1990, with the second show being broadcast live on WXRT.
- Bill Hicks recorded an HBO special, One Night Stand, at the Vic in 1991.
- Tangerine Dream was scheduled to play at The Riviera on Oct 17, 1992, however, just a few days prior to the concert date, the venue was moved to the Vic.
- David Bowie brought his Earthling tour to the Vic on September 19, 1997.
- Siouxsie and the Banshees at the Vic on April 22, 2002.
- Coldplay performed as part of the MTV $2 Bill Concert Series on August 2, 2002.
- Porcupine Tree's In Absentia tour played The Vic on July 25, 2003.
- Ween recorded Live In Chicago, a DVD and CD of their three night run at the Vic in 2003.
- Wilco recorded Kicking Television: Live in Chicago at the Vic in May 2005.
- Jim Gaffigan's Beyond the Pale CD, DVD and TV special were recorded at the Vic in 2006.
- Porcupine Tree brought The Incident tour to The Vic on September 22, 2009.
- Soundgarden played their first reunion show at the Vic on August 5, 2010.
- Hannibal Buress Recorded his second Comedy Central special at the Vic in January 2014.
- Papa Roach recorded Live & Murderous In Chicago, a DVD of their live performance at the Vic.
- Cage the Elephant recorded a live album, Cage the Elephant Live at the Vic in Chicago in 2012.
- King Crimson played in a line-up featuring among others guitarist Robert Fripp and three previous line-ups' drummers performing simultaneously, for 4 consecutive nights in autumn 2014, one of only nine city stops for this incarnation of the band.
- Pete Correale's stand-up special "Let Me Tell Ya" for Showtime was recorded at the Vic in May 2015.
- Iliza Shlesinger's stand-up Netflix special Confirmed Kills was recorded at the Vic on April 23, 2016.
- Pete Holmes’s stand-up HBO Special “Faces and Sounds” was recorded at the Vic in 2016.
- Midnight Oil played here on May 18, 2017, on The Great Circle World Tour, their first tour since 2002.
- Ariana Grande played here on August 22, 2018, for her "Sweetener Sessions" mini tour to celebrate her new album "Sweetener".
- Sabaton played here on October 26, 2019, for their Great Tour, opened by fellow Swedish band HammerFall.
- Jerry Cantrell of Alice in Chains played here on March 26, 2022, on his Brighten tour.
- British rock band the Darkness played here on October 13, 2023, to celebrate the 20th anniversary of their debut album, Permission to Land.
