= The Last Supper (Jim Gaffigan album) =

Studio album by Jim Gaffigan
- Released: May 16, 2004
- Genre: Comedy
- Length: 52:02

Jim Gaffigan chronology
More Moo Moos (2003)	The Last Supper (2004)	Doing My Time (2004)

The Last Supper is the fourth album released by the American stand-up comedian Jim Gaffigan. It focuses largely on his love of food. The album's producer encouraged him to use profanity, and Gaffigan complied.

== Track listing ==
1. The Food Network - 0:42
2. Late Night Eater - 0:37
3. American Eating - 0:26
4. All You Can Eat - 0:21
5. Cinnabon - 1:04
6. I'm a Vegetarian - 2:02
7. Food Critic - 1:03
8. Special Menu - 0:51
9. Your Waiter - 1:04
10. Wine Menu - 0:42
11. Appetizer - 0:58
12. I Love Bread - 0:44
13. From Entrée to Dessert - 1:04
14. Caliente Pockets - 3:48
15. Let's Talk Jesus - 3:27
16. Talking to Moses - 0:48
17. Respect for the Pope - 1:32
18. A Letter From Peter - 0:52
19. Radio Call: "Don't Talk About Jesus" - 3:08
20. Interview: Part I - 0:59
21. I Love Salads & Bars - 2:12
22. Grocery Store - 2:33
23. The Corruption of Granola - 1:10
24. Interview: Part II - 0:50
25. More Watery Water - 1:50
26. Interview: Part III - 1:56
27. Gravy and Cheese - 1:23
28. Country Crock - 1:03
29. The Mexican Conspiracy - 1:30
30. Drinking & Chatting - 4:11
31. Drunk Eating - 0:51
32. Jim's Homemade Hot Dog Recipe - 6:32
