= Jim Gaffigan: Mr. Universe =

Mr. Universe

Live album by Jim Gaffigan
- Released: August 28, 2012
- Recorded: February 25, 2012
- Genre: Comedy
- Length: 74:14
- Label: Comedy Central Records

Jim Gaffigan chronology
King Baby (2009)	Mr. Universe (2012)	Obsessed (2014)

Mr. Universe is the eighth album by American stand-up comedian Jim Gaffigan. Released on August 28, 2012, it was made available on Gaffigan's website for $5 following previously successful $5 experiments by fellow comedian Louis C.K. One dollar from every purchase of the album was donated to the Bob Woodruff Foundation.

== Release ==
The album was released by Comedy Central Records on August 28, 2012, and was also released with the same title on DVD. It was recorded on February 25, 2012, at the Warner Theatre in Washington, D.C.

=== CD track listing ===
1. 4 Kids
2. Disney
3. Photos
4. Working Out
5. Bodybuilders
6. McDonald's
7. Shoes
8. Hotel
9. Hotel Pools
10. Whales
11. Domino's
12. Subway
13. Vitamins
14. ExtenZe

=== DVD release ===
Coinciding with the album release, the DVD was also made available on August 28, 2012. It is the third of Gaffigan's stand up acts to be released to home video. The special was directed by Jay Karas. The outro music for the special was written and performed by fellow comedian Reggie Watts.

== Reception ==
Professional ratings
Review scores
Source	Rating
AllMusic	3.5/5 stars

The album was nominated for the Grammy Award for Best Comedy Album.
