= More Moo Moos =

More Moo-Moos

Studio album by Jim Gaffigan
- Released: 2003
- Genre: Comedy

Jim Gaffigan chronology
Economics II (2001)	More Moo-Moos (2003)	The Last Supper (2004)

More Moo-Moos is the third album released by American stand-up comedian Jim Gaffigan.

== Track listing ==
1. An Interview With the Producer
2. I Am Nothing
3. Illegally Blind
4. Film Director
5. My Baby's Mama
6. Hey Good Looking
7. Intermission One
8. Speak English
9. Dumb Traveler
10. Learning to Walk
11. Baby's Grama
12. I'm a Bad Cuddler
13. Bed Time
14. I Love Spell Chek
15. Intermission Two
16. Calling From a Well
17. Yeah Right, Sea Cow
18. Kevin My Pal
19. Crazy Jim Head
20. Quigley The Giggly
21. For the Next Joke
22. Intermission Three
23. I Love Doing Nothing
24. An Interview With a Manatee
