= Tommy Smith (playwright) =

American dramatist

Tommy Smith (born 1978) is a playwright.

== Early life ==
Initially an actor in Seattle, WA, Smith played roles at the Intiman Theatre and Seattle Repertory Theatre. Smith began writing and adapting plays, winning the Artistic Pick at the 2001 Seattle Fringe Festival with the solo show of Joe Wenderoth's book Letters to Wendy’s, directed by Austin Elston.

== New York theatre ==
Hired to come to New York to perform in Richard Foreman's King Cowboy Rufus Rules The Universe, Smith was accepted into the Juilliard School's Playwriting Program under Marsha Norman and Christopher Durang. Upon graduation, Smith was invited to The Eugene O'Neill National Playwrights Conference to develop the play Air Conditioning.

The next year, Smith teamed with director May Adrales at the Soho Rep Writer/Director Lab to develop White Hot, a darkly comic psychological drama. White Hot premiered at HERE Arts Center and was published in The New York Theatre Review. The foreword by playwright Craig Lucas says:

"[Tommy Smith] is writing in the shadow of our most daring and politically incendiary of martyred playwright saints, Sarah Kane and Edward Bond ... This is bleak terrain, a buried cesspool of self-loathing and unseemly, sadistic yearnings in love. The play can be read as a critique of the deadening fallout of our reactionary, materialistic, exploitative and soulless era. It can be read as a bad dream or a soap opera about the banality of evil. However you read it, it doesn’t go down easy."

Adrales and Smith's next collaboration – the boundary-pushing identity drama The Wife – was hailed by The New York Times as “excellent … [the play] is a brew all Mr. Smith’s own, a sort of warped, contemporary La Ronde.”

== Los Angeles theatre ==
Smith collaborated with director Chris Fields – the ousted founder of the Ojai Playwrights Festival – for three successful Los Angeles productions. Their 90s kitchen sink drama Firemen won five LADCC Awards, including Best Writing, and was named one of the year's best stage shows by The LA Times. The play also generated controversy for its treatment of a romance between a teenage boy and his school secretary.

The following year, Smith and Fields received glowing reviews for Fugue, a violent choral play about the doomed love lives of classical composers Tchaikovsky, Gesualdo, and Schoenberg. Smith and Fields’ artistic relationship crumbled over contractual misunderstandings with their third and final production, the solo female prose play Ghost Light, whose single performance nonetheless generated good notices:

"[Smith’s] words open up onto haunting and darkly grotesque psychic landscapes unreachable by more pedestrian dramatic entertainments, [ranging] in feeling from the experimental flash fictions of Donald Barthelme to the early schizophrenic-styled writing of Peter Handke."

== Collaborations with Reggie Watts ==
Smith premiered three original pieces – Disinformation, Transition and Dutch A/V – at The Public Theater’s Under The Radar Festival with long-time friend and comedian/musician Reggie Watts. A fourth piece performed almost entirely in the dark, Radioplay, opened at PS122. A recording of Transition at On the Boards helped launch the first-ever live performance download website, OTBTV.

While Smith halted actively collaborating with Watts after the singer failed to credit Smith for co-writing the lyrics of viral hits “Fuck Shit Stack” and “What About Blowjobs?”, their pieces played to acclaim and sold-out houses at Portland Institute for Contemporary Art, The Museum of Contemporary Art (Chicago), The Warhol Museum (Pittsburgh), ICA (Boston), Ars Nova (New York), among other venues.

== Awards ==
For work as a playwright in the New York theatre scene, Smith was awarded the PONY Fellowship at the Lark Play Development Center. Smith's collaborations with Watts earned the MAP Fund Award and Creative Capital Award. The New York Times also credited Smith for helping to establish the Indie Rock Musical genre by writing the book for the Williamstown Theatre Festival musical Caravan Man.
