= Maktub (band) =

American music group

- Origin: Seattle, Washington, United States
- Genres: Rock, jazz fusion, progressive rock
- Years active: 1996–present
- Label: Velour Music
- Members: Reggie Watts (Vocals); Kevin Goldman (Bassist); Davis Martin (Drummer); Thaddeus Turner (Guitar); Daniel Spils (Keyboard)
- Past members: Alex Veley (1996–1999); Darrius Willrich

Maktub is a Seattle, Washington-based music group formed in the late 1990s that combines elements of hip-hop, rhythm and blues, soul, and funk, with a sprinkling of jazz and rock.

== History ==
Maktub was formed in 1996 when Davis Martin called Reggie Watts, a student at the Cornish College of the Arts at the time, to come jam with Kevin Goldman, Alex Veley, and himself. After only 5 minutes of jamming, the band hit it off, and by day's end wrote their first song. After realizing their potential, the four planned to commit to each other, calling themselves "Maktub". According to their website, Maktub (مكتوب) is an Arabic word that Reggie got from Paulo Coelho's novel The Alchemist, which translates to, "it is written", or, "destiny".

In August 1999, they released their first album, Subtle Ways. There was an immediate response as the album hit number one on KCMU and later on the soul and urban charts at MP3.com and earned them "Best R&B Album" at the Northwest Music Awards". After they released the album, Alex Veley decided to leave the group to pursue other projects.

In 2000, the group added a new sound to their music by recruiting Thaddeus Turner on guitar and Daniel Spils as their new keyboard player. With the new members of the band, they began recording demos with a handheld MiniDisc and small button microphone.

In 2001 they recorded Khronos in only two weeks, and it was first released a year later. In 2003, after selling more than 20,000 copies, Velour Music in New York City took notice of their success and re-released Khronos nationally. With this new national recognition, they embarked on a six-month tour in the same year, traveling all around the United States. Upon their return to Seattle, they begin to write new songs and record new demos, most of which are done with their minidisc recorder and single button microphone.

In 2004, they recorded their third album, Say What You Mean. The album was released in April 2005 and was followed by a three-month tour around the continental United States.

2007 saw the anticipated release of Start It Over. This album marked a new trend in the band's deeper interaction with its followers. It was funded by the members of their fan club, M.A.R.C. 7.

Date of Official Release	Title	"Label"	Album Info
June 29, 1999	Subtle Ways	Jasiri Media Group	1. Intuition – 5:29; 2. Love Me Like Before – 4:41; 3. Just Can't Make It – 3:54; 4. For Perfection – 3:53; 5. Lies – 2:45; 6. Dichotomy – 5:35; 7. First Time – 5:07; 8. Believe – 6:46; 9. Twilight – 3:04; 10. Internal Light – 13:43; 11. Subtle Ways – 5:19; Recorded: Avast! Studio (Seattle) in December 1998 & Stank Face Labs (Seattle) in April 1998; Producers: Steve Fisk, Brad Smith & Maktub; Engineer: Stuart Hallerman; Subtle Ways is the first studio album released by Maktub. It was voted 1999 Northwest soul album of the year by the Grammy Association and Billboard Magazine called it "fresh and original."
April 8, 2003	Khronos	Ossia	1. You Can't Hide – 3:31; 2. So Tired – 3:20; 3. Give Me Some Time – 3:23; 4. Baby Can't Wait – 3:55; 5. We've Got Desire – 3:41; 6. Just Like Murder – 4:32; 7. See Clearly – 5:47; 8. Say You Will – 4:14; 9. No Quarter – 8:04; 10. Motherfucker – 4:29; 11. Then We'll Know – 7:00; Recorded: Avast! Studio in Seattle, WA; Producer: Steve Fisk & Maktub; Engineer: Stuart Hallerman (Stuart also mixed See Clearly); Executive producer: Gerald N. Turner Sr.; Khronos is the second album released by Maktub. Originally released on the band's label, after a year of good initial sales New York City label Velour signed Maktub and the album was re-released on April 8, 2003, minus the track "Motherfucker".
April 8, 2003	Khronos	Velour Recordings	1. You Can't Hide – 3:31; 2. So Tired – 3:20; 3. Give Me Some Time – 3:23; 4. Baby Can't Wait – 3:55; 5. We've Got Desire – 3:41; 6. Just Like Murder – 4:32; 7. See Clearly – 5:47; 8. Say You Will – 4:14; 9. No Quarter – 8:04; 10. Then We'll Know – 7:00; Recorded: Avast! Studio in Seattle, WA; Producer: Steve Fisk and Maktub; Engineer: Stuart Hallerman (Stuart also mixed See Clearly); Executive producer: Gerald N. Turner Sr.; Khronos is the second and a half album released by Maktub. Originally released on the band's label, after a year of good initial sales New York City label Velour signed Maktub and the album was re-released on April 8, 2003, minus one track from the original.
April 12, 2005	Say What You Mean	Kufala	1. Promise Me – 4:28; 2. Say What You Mean – 4:11; 3. 20 Years – 5:21; 4. Daily Dosage – 3:38; 5. Hunt You Down – 4:16; 6. Seeing Is Believing – 3:39; 7. Blown Away – 5:09; 8. Feel Like Another One – 4:31; 9. Nobody Loves You Like I Do – 4:28; 10. Right to Breathe – 5:24; Producers: Bob Power – except track eight (Steve Fisk) and track nine (Joe Chiccarelli); Recorded: in Seattle at Robert Lang Studios, Electrokitty Recording, Jupiter Studios, Ironwood Studios, Steve Fisk's studio and Daniel's basement.; Mixed: The Warehouse Studio in Vancouver, BC except "Nobody Loves You Like I Do" (Cello Studios in LA) and "Feel Like Another One" (Studio X in Seattle)
November 6, 2007	Start It Over		1. open mind 2. where do we go?; 3. words are not enough 4. leave a little 5. wantchu (nothing's ever quite as it seems); 6. give me death 7. let's stay out all night 8. if i had to start it over 9. i just want to know your name 10. nothing stays the same 11. hard to let you go; Recorded: Avast! II Studios in Seattle, WA; Producer: Steve Fisk; Co-producer: Stuart Hallerman; Engineer: Stuart Hallerman; Executive producers: 200 M.A.R.C.7 members; Album design by Kevin Goldman; Songs by Maktub; Start It Over is the fourth album by Maktub. It was written, arranged and recorded in six days (May 6 through 12) in Seattle and funded by 200 M.A.R.C.7 (Maktub Album Recording Club 2007) members, each of whom donated $50.
2009	Five		1. Slippin' Away; 2. You Know I Love You; 3. It's Never Enough; 4. Strange World; 5. Mystery Of You; 6. Seems Like Only Yesterday; 7. Took It All Away; 8. Love To Stay; 9. The Alchemist
