= Say What You Mean =

Studio album by Maktub
- Released: April 12, 2005
- Studio: Robert Lang (Shoreline, Washington); Chez Bob (New York, New York)
- Genre: Rock and roll; soul; rhythm and blues
- Label: Velour
- Producer: Bob Power; Steve Fisk; Joe Chiccarelli

Maktub chronology
Khronos (2003)	Say What You Mean (2005)

Say What You Mean is the third studio album by the Washington-based music group Maktub.

== Track listing ==
1. "Promise Me" – 4:28
2. "Say What You Mean" – 4:11
3. "20 Years" – 5:21
4. "Daily Dosage" – 3:38
5. "Hunt You Down" – 4:16
6. "Seeing Is Believing" – 3:39
7. "Blown Away" – 5:09
8. "Feel Like Another One" – 4:31
9. "Nobody Loves You Like I Do" – 4:28
10. "Right to Breathe" – 5:24
