= Khronos (Maktub album) =

Studio album by Maktub
- Released: 2002; April 8, 2003 (re-release)
- Recorded: 2001
- Genre: R&B
- Label: Ossia; Velour (re-release)

Maktub chronology
Subtle Ways (1999)	Khronos (2002)	Say What You Mean (2005)

Professional ratings
Review scores
Source	Rating
Allmusic	4/5 stars

Khronos is the second album released by Maktub. It was recorded and mixed in only two weeks with producer Steve Fisk. Originally released on Ossia Records, after a year of good initial sales, New York City label Velour signed Maktub and the album was re-released on April 8, 2003 minus one track (track 10: "Motherfucker").

== Track listing ==
1. "You Can't Hide" – 3:31
2. "So Tired" – 3:20
3. "Give Me Some Time" – 3:23
4. "Baby Can't Wait" – 3:55
5. "We've Got Desire" – 3:41
6. "Just Like Murder" – 4:32
7. "See Clearly" – 5:47
8. "Say You Will" – 4:14
9. "No Quarter" – 8:04
10. "Then We'll Know" – 7:00
