= King Baby (album) =

Live album by Jim Gaffigan
- Released: March 31, 2009
- Recorded: December 6, 2008 at The Paramount Theatre in Austin, Texas
- Genre: Comedy
- Length: 1:06:40
- Label: Comedy Central Records
- Producer: Jack Vaughn Jr.

Jim Gaffigan chronology
Beyond the Pale (2006)	King Baby (2009)	Mr. Universe (2012)

DVD Cover
- Cover for the DVD release

Professional ratings
Review scores
Source	Rating
AllMusic	4/5 stars

King Baby is an album by American stand-up comedian Jim Gaffigan.

== CD and DVD release ==
The album was released on March 31, 2009, by Comedy Central Records and was also released with the same title on DVD. The album was recorded at The Paramount Theatre in Austin, Texas.

=== CD track listing ===
1. Inside Voice (1:59)
2. Bowling (5:11)
3. Lazy (3:05)
4. Escalators (3:16)
5. Camping (4:55)
6. Bed (4:37)
7. Bacon (4:52)
8. Ribs and Bologna (3:32)
9. Recycling (4:03)
10. Deodorant (4:08)
11. Circumcision (4:51)
12. Almost Heaven (5:07)
13. House Guest (1:54)
14. Dunkin' Donuts (2:29)
15. Fast Food (5:15)
16. Catsup (4:37)
17. Waffle House (3:01)

=== DVD release ===
Jim Gaffigan's stand up special King Baby was released on March 31, 2009, on DVD. The DVD was uncensored and uncut with 72 minutes of material. The special was directed by Troy Miller and was Jim Gaffigan's second stand-up DVD release, the other being Beyond the Pale. In addition to the main performance, the DVD also contains seven bonus features of behind the scenes footage and interviews.
