= Jim Gaffigan =

American comedian and actor (born 1966)

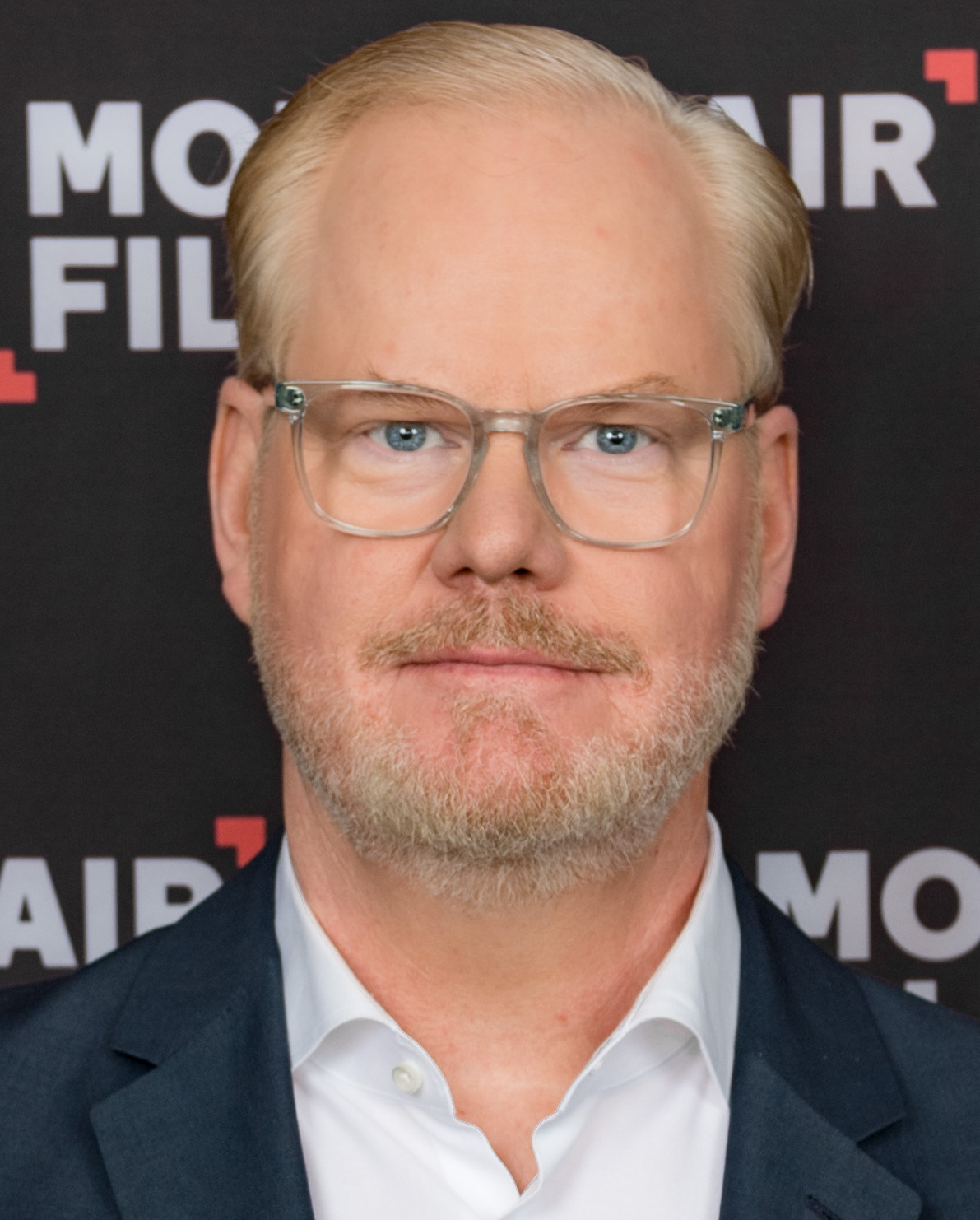
- Gaffigan in 2023
- Born: James Christopher Gaffigan; July 7, 1966 (age 60); Elgin, Illinois, U.S.
- Education: Georgetown University (BS)
- Spouse: Jeannie Noth (m. 2003)
- Children: 5
- Relatives: Richard F. Mitchell (grandfather)

Comedy career
- Years active: 1991–present
- Medium: Stand-up; television; film; books
- Genres: Observational comedy; clean comedy; deadpan; sarcasm; satire
- Subjects: American culture; religion; obesity; everyday life; marriage; social awkwardness
- Website: jimgaffigan.com

James Christopher Gaffigan (born July 7, 1966) is an eight-time Grammy nominated American stand-up comedian, actor, writer, and producer. He is a two-time New York Times best-selling author, three-time Emmy winning performer and multiplatinum-selling recording artist. In 2025, Billboard named Gaffigan's tour as one of "The Top 10 Highest Grossing Comedy Tours" of the year.

Gaffigan is known for his unique brand of humor, which often addresses fatherhood, laziness, food, religion, and general observations. He is regarded as a "clean" comic, using little profanity in his routines, although he does use it from time to time. He has released thirteen successful long-form comedy specials.

Gaffigan is also an actor, appearing in comedic and dramatic roles in film, television and on Broadway. He is married to actress, producer and writer Jeannie Gaffigan, with whom he has five children.

== Early life ==
Gaffigan was born on July 7, 1966, in Elgin, Illinois. He is the youngest of six children, born to charity worker and fundraiser Marcia Miriam (née Mitchell) and banker Michael Ambrose Gaffigan. Of Irish descent, his family's surname was Gavahan. His maternal grandfather was Iowa Supreme Court Justice Richard F. Mitchell. Gaffigan was raised in Chesterton in Northwest Indiana, a region that he has stated influenced his comedy because of its authenticity, and often jokes about growing up in a large family. His mother was accomplished at needlework and received a national award for original design and craftsmanship from the American Needlepoint Guild in 1985. She died of cancer in 1990 at age 53.

Gaffigan's father was the president and CEO of the Mercantile National Bank of Indiana for 15 years until his retirement in 1991. A former seminarian, he was also actively involved in local charity work. He died of lung cancer in 1999. Gaffigan's father was the first in his family to attend college, and encouraged his children to seek careers that promised job security. However, at about the age of five, Gaffigan announced that he wanted to be an actress unaware that it was the female noun for the occupation.

As a teenager, Gaffigan watched Saturday Night Live and Late Night with David Letterman. He attended La Lumiere School in La Porte, Indiana, where he played on the school's football team. He attended Purdue University for one year, where he was a member of the Phi Gamma Delta fraternity, before transferring to Georgetown University's McDonough School of Business, where he graduated in 1988 with a degree in finance. Although he "hated" studying finance, he worked as a litigation consultant for a short time after graduating and "was horrible at it". He played football at Georgetown and Purdue.

== Career ==
=== Stand-up ===
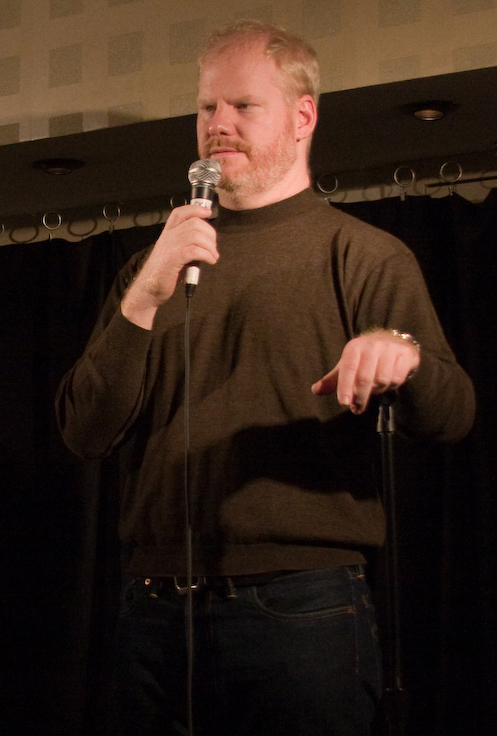
Gaffigan performing in May 2008

Gaffigan moved to New York in 1990 to work in advertising, initially as an assistant account executive before switching to copywriting. A co-worker encouraged him to take an improv class to deal with fears surrounding public speaking. His stand-up career launched after a friend from his improv class dared him to take a stand-up seminar that required a live set at the end. Gaffigan fell in love with stand-up, and began playing comedy clubs nightly. At the start of his career, Gaffigan worked a full-time day job, took acting classes at night, and did stand-up until the early hours of the morning. He was often found sleeping at his day job; his boss had to wake him up to fire him. For the first couple years of Gaffigan's stand-up career, he tried various styles, ranging from angry comedy to impressions and voices. After auditioning for The Late Show with David Letterman for six years, Gaffigan booked a spot on the show, did a successful stand-up routine on the show in 1999, and his career took off.

==== Long-form comedy specials ====
In October 2005, Gaffigan filmed his first hour-long comedy special for Comedy Central that aired the following January, and became the comedy album/DVD Beyond the Pale. The special/album/DVD included material regarding food and American eating habits; the comedian unknowingly predicted a future menu item at Dunkin' Donuts—the "glazed donut breakfast sandwich"—while commenting on the future of America's eating habits.

His 2009 album King Baby was also a television special for Comedy Central filmed in Austin, Texas.

On February 25, 2012, Gaffigan taped a one-hour stand-up special—Mr. Universe—at the Warner Theater in Washington, D.C.; it was nominated for a Grammy. He announced that, based on the business model used by Louis C.K.'s Live at the Beacon Theater, Mr. Universe would be available online through his website for $5, with 20% of the total proceeds going to the Bob Woodruff Foundation, an organization that provides support to military veterans. In 2012, he was among the top-ten grossing comics in the US, according to Pollstar. In 2014, Gaffigan was named the "King of Clean" by the Wall Street Journal.

Gaffigan filmed his 2014 comedy special titled Jim Gaffigan: Obsessed at Boston's Wilbur Theater on January 18, 2014. Obsessed premiered on Comedy Central on April 27 becoming the most watched stand-up comedy special of the year for the network. The accompanying album, also titled Obsessed, debuted at number 11 on the Billboard 200 and number 1 on the Billboard Comedy Album charts. 2015 saw him embark on a headlining tour, culminating in a sold-out show at Madison Square Garden.

Gaffigan has also pioneered exploring new and different platforms for his comedy specials. He was one of the first comedians to experiment with limited theatrical and website releases of comedy specials. He had the first original stand-up comedy special released on Amazon Prime Video (Noble Ape, 2018) and Hulu (The Skinny, 2024).

On July 29, 2020, Gaffigan was announced as the first stand-up comic to hit over one billion streams on Pandora.com. Also that year, Gaffigan's Pale Tourist, a compilation of 4 short comedy specials shot in or about different countries/parts of the world premiered on Amazon Prime video. Gaffigan's 9th special, Comedy Monster, which streamed on Netflix, was nominated for a 2023 Grammy Award.

His 10th comedy special, 2023's Dark Pale, was met with critical fanfare with The New York Times calling it, “his best yet.” Gaffigan co-headlined with Jerry Seinfeld a sold-out multi-city arena tour, including two shows at The Hollywood Bowl during the Netflix Is Joke Festival.

On November 23, 2025, Gaffigan released Live from Old Forester—The Bourbon Set as a surprise drop on his YouTube channel, which has garnered 4.8 million views. The bourbon-centric long form comedy special was filmed at The Kentucky Center for the Performing Arts in Louisville and is entirely about whiskey. Gaffigan has described the show as a passion project stemming from his recent obsession with bourbon and love for the whiskey community.

==== Other stand-up appearances ====
Gaffigan has performed stand-up to support charitable causes as well. In 2002, he was part of a United Service Organization event at Guantanamo Bay Naval Base. Gaffigan performed at the 2013 Stand Up for Heroes charity event benefitting the Bob Woodruff Foundation alongside fellow stand-up comedians Jerry Seinfeld, Bill Cosby and Jon Stewart. Gaffigan also performed at the 2013 CNN Heroes event, which celebrates everyday heroes doing extraordinary work around the world. In May 2014, Gaffigan performed at the Make It Right Gala, an organization founded by Brad Pitt, which builds sustainable homes and buildings for communities in need.

On September 26, 2015, he performed at the Festival of Families, a Catholic event held in Philadelphia. Gaffigan was the only comedian on the bill at the festival, and the event was visited by Pope Francis. The event had more than one million attendees.

Gaffigan has hosted The Al Smith Memorial Dinner multiple times. In October 2024, Gaffigan roasted President Trump and an absent Vice President Kamala Harris.

==== Comedic style ====
Gaffigan's style is largely observational. Some of his main topics are laziness, eating and parenthood. His famous Hot Pocket routine was inspired by a commercial he saw that he mistook for a Saturday Night Live sketch.

Gaffigan often “talks for the audience” or uses an “inside voice". For example, in a high-pitched voice, he may portray someone giving negative feedback on his own performance. After he made a diarrhea joke in his 2012 special "Mr. Universe", he used the voice to say, "Really, he's using diarrhea jokes?" He has said, "That inside voice is my connection with the audience". In an interview with the Duluth News-Tribune, he explained that he began developing the voice as a teenager, when he disarmed people by talking for them in their presence. He said he also used it to fend off hecklers earlier in his career, when comedy clubs were more "combative". He cursed early in his career, and added cursing to his comedy album Doing My Time at the request of his label, in the hopes of drawing more teens. He removed profanity from his routine, as he feels his subject matter doesn't lend itself to cursing and it reduced the effort he put into crafting his jokes.

Gaffigan's stand-up writing is characterized by single topic thoroughness. He discusses and dissects a topic for long stretches of time. These topics can range from bacon to horses to teenagers. Gaffigan has performed entire comedy specials such as Pale Tourist and Live from Old Forester—The Bourbon Set solely focused on single topics.

==== Influences ====
Gaffigan credits David Letterman and Bill Murray as influences, and has asserted that Richard Pryor was the greatest stand-up comedian ever. His comedy mentor was Dave Attell, who Gaffigan said was the only person who thought he was funny in his early stand-up years. On the episode of Comedians in Cars Getting Coffee featuring Gaffigan, he admitted that the show's host Jerry Seinfeld was a big influence for him.

==== Reception ====
Gaffigan is widely noted as an everyman and a clean comic; some of his signature routines regard Hot Pockets, cake, and bacon. One critic compared him to Full House-era Bob Saget (who starred in the 1990s family show), which Gaffigan took as an insult. Hampton Stevens in The Atlantic wrote that Gaffigan "champions a vital element to standup that [Lenny] Bruce had taken away—the indispensable, but apparently forgotten idea that comedians have no obligation to be provocative, topical, socially conscious, or anything else but funny."

=== Acting ===
==== Film acting ====
Gaffigan earned the nickname "King of Sundance" in 2019 when three of his feature films (Troop Zero, Them That Follow, and Light from Light premiered at the Sundance Film Festival. Gaffigan appeared in two movies chosen for the 2001 Sundance Film Festival: Super Troopers and 30 Years to Life. In 2023, Gaffigan was on the Sundance Film Festival Jury.

Gaffigan appeared in the Sam Mendes–directed dramedy Away We Go and the teen comedy 17 Again. Gaffigan starred in Shia LaBeouf's 2013 short film Howard Cantour.com, the content of which was later revealed to be mostly plagiarized from Daniel Clowes's 2007 graphic novella Justin M. Damiano. Reflecting on the incident in an interview for The Daily Beast, Gaffigan said, "There's no greater sin in the stand-up world than thievery...So you do not want to be associated with thievery," but added, "I don't have any hard feelings about it because I don't think people think I had anything to do with it." In 2008, he appeared in the movie The Love Guru starring Mike Myers.

Gaffigan co-starred in the film Experimenter, a fictionalized account of the experiments of the Yale professor Stanley Milgram. Gaffigan plays an actor hired to collaborate in the experiments. Gaffigan portrayed George Westinghouse in Michael Almereyda's 2020 film Tesla.

In 2018, he portrayed Paul Markham in the biographical drama Chappaquiddick, starring Jason Clarke and Kate Mara, to positive reviews. Gaffigan next took on the lead role in the 2018 neo-noir film American Dreamer, which was released on September 20, 2019. Gaffigan's dark portrayal of a broken man driven to desperate actions was very well received by critics, with the Chicago Sun-Times review calling it "a career-best dramatic performance" by Gaffigan.

In January 2021, he joined the cast of Disney's Peter Pan & Wendy as Mr. Smee directed by David Lowery. Lowery produced Light from Light and also directed Gaffigan in the animated short film, An Almost Christmas Story.

Gaffigan co-starred in Colin West's Linoleum which Vulture placed on its Best Movies of 2023 list. Gaffigan was reunited with director Colin West on the film Outside of Cleveland, with Alex Wolff and Sarah Wayne Callies.

In 2026, Gaffigan co-starred in Joshua Caldwell's Three People In The Woods, with Katherine McPhee and Henry Thomas. He was also in Blaise Bayhan's New England Toys with Jennifer Jason Leigh and Jason Schwartzmann, and Crosshairs with Alec Baldwin directed by Mukunda Michael Dewil.

==== Television acting ====
After his first appearance on The Late Show with David Letterman in 1999, Gaffigan was tapped by the host to develop a sitcom called Welcome to New York in which he also co-starred alongside Christine Baranski. The show was cancelled after its first season, despite positive reviews. During the 2000/2001 TV season, he was a cast member of The Ellen Show on CBS, Ellen DeGeneres's second sitcom.

Gaffigan was a recurring character on That '70s Show, and Ed before becoming a regular cast member of the TBS original sitcom My Boys, which he left at the end of its third season. He appeared on multiple Law & Order episodes and spinoffs of the show. These include "Flight" and "Reality Bites", and in the "Smile" episode Law & Order: Criminal Intent. In 2009, Gaffigan guest-starred as the best friend of Murray Hewitt in an episode of the HBO comedy series Flight of the Conchords.

Gaffigan was in an episode of The Daily Show as a man posing as a Daily Show correspondent who knows nothing about the show (he refers to it as "The John Daily Show") and just wants to be seen with Jon Stewart. It was meant as a parody of the 2009 White House gatecrash incident.

Gaffigan co-created and starred in the TV Land series The Jim Gaffigan Show. In the 2010s, Gaffigan, his wife, and Peter Tolan began to develop material for a show based loosely on their own life. CBS agreed to shoot a pilot of their show in March 2013 but ultimately passed on the project. TV Land acquired the rights in an effort to broadcast original material and attract younger audiences, and it offered the Gaffigans complete creative control. The result was The Jim Gaffigan Show, a sitcom about a couple raising their five kids in a two-bedroom New York City apartment. After the release of two online-only episodes in June 2015, the pilot episode aired on July 15, 2015. The show stars Gaffigan as a fictionalized version of himself, with his wife Jeannie played by Ashley Williams. Other characters include their real-estate agent and Jeannie's best friend Daniel (played by Michael Ian Black), Jim's fellow comic and best friend Dave (Adam Goldberg), and their priest, Father Nicholas (Tongayi Chirisa). After 2 seasons of the show, in 2016 Jim and his wife Jeannie decided not to continue with a third season so they could spend more time with their five young children.

In October 2016, it was announced Gaffigan would be joining the cast of the third season of the anthology drama series Fargo. However, he was ultimately forced to drop out due to scheduling difficulties; he was replaced by Mark Forward.

In 2024, Gaffigan began appearing on Saturday Night Live to portray Democratic nominee for vice president Tim Walz. His portrayal of Walz was widely praised.

Gaffigan appears as President Grover Cleveland in the fourth season of HBO's The Gilded Age.

==== Commercial acting ====
I did my set, I walked off stage and they said the executive producer wants to meet you up in his office. I thought maybe it was going to be something good. I thought maybe Dave wants me to be a writer. But they wanted me to develop my own show.

— Jim Gaffigan, Laugh Spin interview, 2005

As a struggling stand-up comedian in the 1990s, a friend suggested Gaffigan audition for commercials, a move that turned out to be profitable. He has appeared in over 200 TV commercial campaigns, ranging from Rolling Rock to Saturn to ESPN. His ubiquity earned him the title of 'Salesman of the Year' by BusinessWeek in 1999. He also performed in a trio of Sierra Mist commercials for the 2007 Super Bowl as part of the comedy ensemble "The Mis-Takes" which included Tracy Morgan and Michael Ian Black. In February 2016, Gaffigan began appearing in KFC commercials as Colonel Sanders, replacing Norm Macdonald. On April 8, 2016, Gaffigan appeared with his family in a marketing campaign for the 2017 Chrysler Pacifica.

==== Animation/voice work ====
Gaffigan is also noted for his voice-over work. In a series of animated shorts for Late Night with Conan O'Brien titled Pale Force (2005 to 2008), Gaffigan wrote, produced and voiced all the characters. The animated sketches featured Gaffigan and O'Brien as superheroes who fight crime with their extremely pale skin. The series was nominated for a Daytime Emmy in 2007 in the category of Outstanding Broadband Program–Comedy.

Gaffigan has also voiced characters on the animated shows Bob's Burgers, Rick and Morty, Shorty McShorts' Shorts, WordGirl, and Star vs. the Forces of Evil. Animated feature films include the Pixar film Luca, Hotel Transylvania, Duck Duck Goose, and Playmobil: The Movie.

==== Theater acting ====
Gaffigan appeared on Broadway in That Championship Season, which opened in March 2011, opposite Brian Cox, Chris Noth, Kiefer Sutherland, and Jason Patric. ABC News correspondent Sandy Kenyon praised his performance as "the most moving" and said that he "may steal the show". Gaffigan called being on Broadway "an amazing experience, really hard but really fun".

In December 2025 Gaffigan returned to Broadway in All Out: Comedy About Ambition which involved a rotating star-studded ensemble.

=== Writing ===
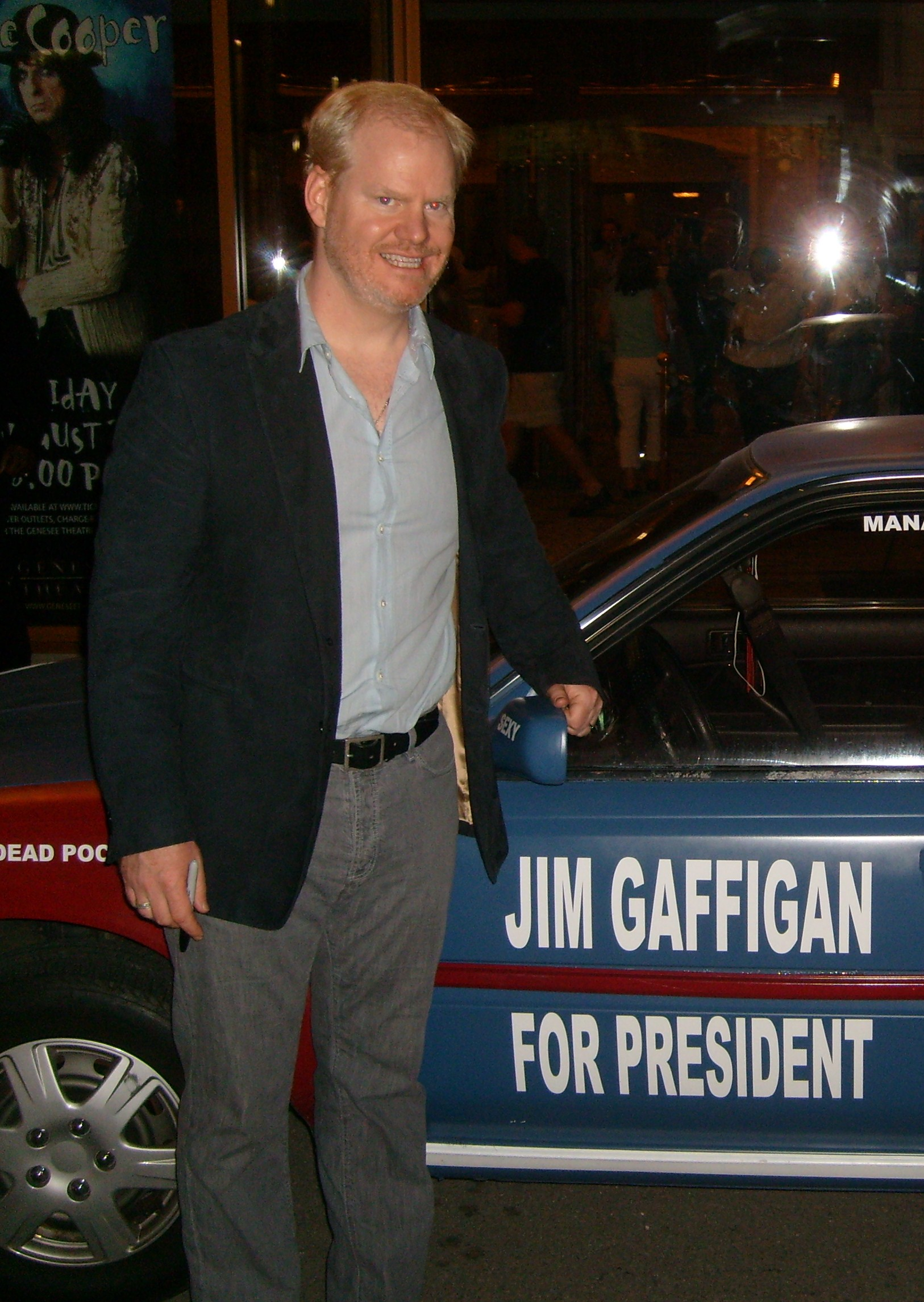
Gaffigan in 2008

Gaffigan's humorous quips have earned him over two and a half million followers on Twitter. He was listed by Rolling Stone as one of the "25 funniest people on Twitter" in 2012.

==== Books ====
Gaffigan's books of essays 2013's Dad is Fat and 2014's Food: A Love Story were published by Crown Publishers and reached the New York Times Best Seller List.

The tile Dad Is Fat, was derived from the first complete sentence his eldest son wrote on a dry-erase board at the age of four or five. "He showed it to me," Gaffigan recalled in an interview, "and I laughed, and then I put him up for adoption." The book is a collection of essays dealing with the raising of his children, as well as reminiscences from his own childhood. In support of the volume, he appeared on NPR's Weekend Edition, ABC's The View, and MSNBC's Morning Joe, spoke at BEA in New York, and embarked on a nine-stop bus tour that ended on Father's Day. Dad is Fat debuted at number five on The New York Times Best Seller list, remaining on the list for three months. Regarding the audiobook, which Gaffigan read, Audiofile said his "performance strikes the right balance between his near-deadpan comedy delivery and the energy needed to keep a beleaguered parent engaged".

Gaffigan signed with Crown Publishing in June 2013 to write a second book of comic essays. The book, Food: A Love Story, was released in Fall 2014. Publishers Weekly said the book "packs plenty of laughs". Kirkus Reviews remarked that "Gaffigan somehow manages to work 'clean' without ever becoming sickeningly saccharine," and that "laughs [are] served up just right on every page". Of the accompanying audiobook, the Library Journal said, "The witty commentary is peppered with jokes and funny stories that will have listeners smiling throughout and occasionally laughing out loud."

==== CBS Sunday Morning commentaries ====
Gaffigan contributed short humorous commentaries to the CBS Sunday Morning show, which earned Gaffigan three Emmy awards. These commentaries mainly addressed parenting and slice of life topics. Gaffigan's columns and style was often compared favoriably to Andy Rooney's 60 Minutes commentaries.

==== Writing with wife Jeannie Gaffigan ====
Gaffigan sometimes writes with his wife, Jeannie Gaffigan. Prior to meeting his wife, actress Jeannie Noth, Gaffigan largely wrote alone. However, while working on his first show, Welcome to New York, he was overwhelmed and asked for input from her (then his girlfriend). Although initially hesitant to have a collaborator, as their relationship grew, so did Noth's ability to write material for him. Once they married, she left behind her work with her youth theater project (Shakespeare on the Playground) to devote herself to raising their expanding brood, and after a joke she wrote drew big laughs at a show, she and Jim began to collaborate more. She gradually transferred into the position of writing partners on select projects. She has been a credited writer and/or executive producer on some comedy specials, including his two books and television show. He also credits her with "coaching" him through his performance in That Championship Season.

=== Fathertime Bourbon ===
In 2024, Gaffigan launched his own bourbon whiskey company, Fathertime Bourbon, with his college friend, Stu Pollard. Named for the "occasional brief period of peace and reflection every hardworking father earns" with a label that features Gaffigan's paternal grandfather, Fathertime is a high-rye expression. Fathertime Bourbon has received many accolades and won the Best New Bourbon award in the 2026 San Francisco World Spirits competition. Gaffigan is heavily involved in every aspect of the Fathertime business, including sampling and choosing all the barrels that eventually get bottled.

== Personal life ==
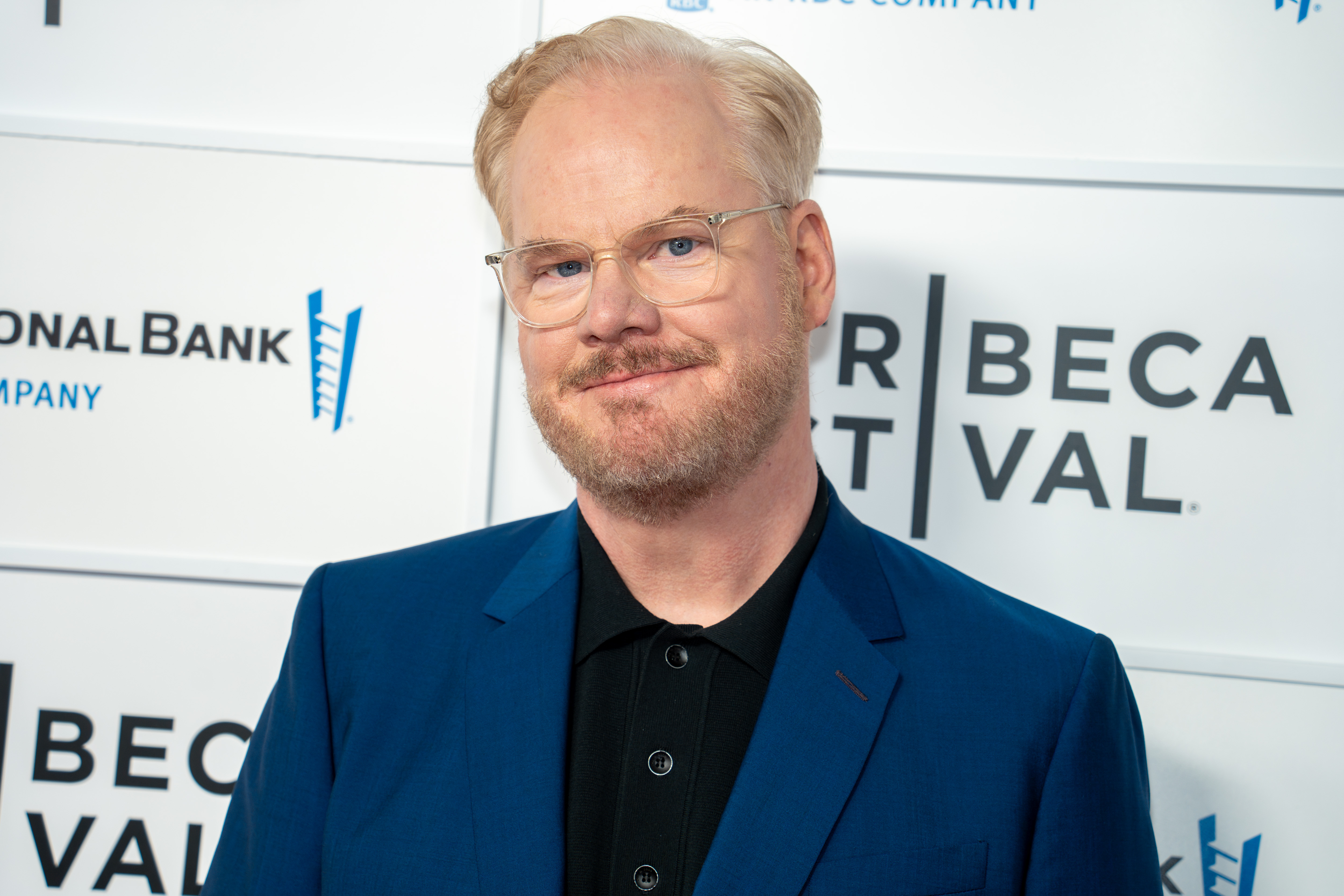
Jim Gaffigan at the 2025 Tribeca Festival

Gaffigan married actress Jeannie Gaffigan (née Noth) in 2003. They have two daughters and three sons. All children were home births in their two bedroom apartment in New York City. His oldest child, Marre, was born on May 2, 2004. The second child, Jack, was born on November 27, 2005. Their third child, Katie Louise, was born on May 10, 2009. Their fourth child, Michael, was born on June 19, 2011. Their youngest child, Patrick was born on September 27, 2012. The family of seven lived in a two-bedroom apartment in the Manhattan borough of New York City before moving to a larger Manhattan apartment in 2015.

To stay connected to his family, Gaffigan tries to "maintain bedtime rituals while working in the city". When on tour, he reportedly often takes his family with him. His son, Jack, has opened for his father's shows on occasion.

Gaffigan is a practicing Catholic and has said he avoids working on Sundays, though he has joked that his wife is so much more devout than him that she seems like a "Shiite Catholic" in comparison. He and his family attend Mass at St. Patrick's Old Cathedral in Manhattan, which is also where he and his wife were married and where their children were baptized. In May 2016, he and his wife delivered the commencement address at the Catholic University of America. They also delivered the commencement address at his wife's alma mater, Marquette University, in May 2018. They both received honorary Doctor of Humane Letters degrees as part of the graduation ceremony.

In 2019, Gaffigan apologized on social media after endorsing the "Moriori First" myth in one of his stand-up shows. The myth falsely claims that Māori displaced the Moriori as the first people of New Zealand, and has been used to justify white settler colonialism. Gaffigan also made disparaging remarks about Māori people, which were described as "offensive" and "ignorant" on New Zealand social media.

== Discography ==
=== Stand-Up Specials ===
YEAR	TITLE	LENGTH	RELEASED ON	STREAMING	RECORDED AT	NOTES
2000	Comedy Central Presents: Jim Gaffigan	24 minutes	Comedy Central	Paramount Plus	New York	
2001	Luigi's Doghouse	42 minutes	Self-released album	Album Only	New York	15 tracks
	Economics II	27 minutes	Self-released album	Album Only	New York	8 tracks
2003	More Moo Moos	51 minutes	Self-released album	Album Only	New York	23 tracks
2004	The Last Supper	52 minutes	Self-released album	Album Only	New York	29 tracks
2004	Doing My Time	63 minutes	Comedy Central Records	Album Only	Giggle's Comedy Club, Seattle	13 tracks plus special features
2006	Beyond The Pale	72 minutes	Comedy Central	Netflix	Chicago's Vic Theatre	
2009	King Baby	72 minutes	Comedy Central	Netflix	Austin's Paramount Theatre	
2012	Mr. Universe	77 minutes	jimgaffigan.com	Netflix	DC's Warner Theatre	Grammy nomination
2014	Obsessed	70 minutes	Theatrical release	Netflix	Boston's Wilbur Theatre	Grammy nomination
2017	Cinco	73 minutes	Netflix	Netflix	Palace Theatre, Columbus, OH	Grammy nomination
2018	Noble Ape	70 minutes	Amazon Prime	Amazon Prime	Boston's Wilbur Theatre	Grammy nomination
2019	Quality Time	75 minutes	Comedy Central	Amazon Prime	State Theatre	Grammy nomination
2020	The Pale Tourist	45 minutes	Amazon Prime	Amazon Prime	Center in the Square, Kitchener, Ontario, Canada	Grammy Nomination
	The Pale Tourist/Spanish-American	50 minutes	Amazon Prime	Amazon Prime	Club Capital, Barcelona, Spain	
	The Pale Tourist/Asian- American	26 minutes	Featured on The Pale Album only	YouTube	Ewha Women's University Samsung Hall, Seoul, Korea	Recorded while on International tour
	The Pale Tourist/Florida Man	14 minutes	Featured on The Pale Album only	YouTube		
2021	Comedy Monster	70 minutes	Netflix	Netflix	Boston's Wilbur Theatre	Grammy Nomination
2022	Dark Pale	64 minutes	Amazon Prime	Amazon Prime	Straz Center	People's Choice Nomination for Favorite Comedian
2023	The Prisoner	44 minutes	Comedy Dynamics	Album Only		Grammy Nomination
2024	The Skinny	61 minutes	Hulu	Hulu	Boston's Wilbur Theatre	
2025	Live from Old Forrester—The Bourbon Set	44 minutes	YouTube	YouTube	Kentucky Center	

== Filmography ==
=== Film ===
Year	Title	Role	Notes
1998	The Real Howard Spitz	Storekeeper	
1999	Personals	Waiter	
1999	Entropy	Bucky	
1999	Three Kings	Cuts Troy's Cuff Soldier	
1999	Puppet	Mr. Kamen	
2001	Super Troopers	Larry Johnson	
2001	30 Years to Life	Russell	
2001	Final	Dayton	
2002	Hacks	Arty Hittle	
2002	No Sleep 'til Madison	Owen	
2002	Igby Goes Down	Hilton Manager	
2003	Season of Youth	Dr. Gelding	
2004	13 Going on 30	Chris Grandy	
2004	Duane Incarnate	Bob	
2005	The Great New Wonderful	Sandie	
2005	Trust the Man	Gordon	
2006	Stephanie Daley	Joe Daley	
2007	The Living Wake	Lampert Binew	
2008	The Love Guru	Trent Lueders	
2008	Shoot First and Pray You Live (Because Luck Has Nothing to Do with It)	Mart Ryder	
2009	The Slammin' Salmon	Stanley Bellin	
2009	17 Again	Coach Murphy	
2009	Away We Go	Lowell	
2010	Ten Stories Tall	Simon	
2010	Going the Distance	Phil	
2010	It's Kind of a Funny Story	George	
2011	Salvation Boulevard	Jerry Hobson	
2012	Howard Cantour.com	Howard Cantour	Short film
2013	Kilimanjaro	Bill	
2015	Walter	Corey	
2015	Experimenter	James McDonough	
2015	Hot Pursuit	Red	
2015	Staten Island Summer	Danny's Father	
2016	Chuck	John Stoehr	
2017	Chappaquiddick	Paul F. Markham	
2018	Duck Duck Goose	Peng	Voice role
2018	Being Frank	Frank Hansen	
2018	Super Troopers 2	Larry Johnson	
2018	Hotel Transylvania 3: Summer Vacation	Abraham Van Helsing	Voice role
2018	American Dreamer	Cam	
2019	Them That Follow	Zeke Slaughter	
2019	Light from Light	Richard	
2019	Troop Zero	Ramsey	
2019	The Day Shall Come	Lemmy	
2019	Drunk Parents	Carl Mancini	
2019	Above the Shadows	Paul Jederman	
2019	Playmobil: The Movie	Del	Voice role
2020	Tesla	George Westinghouse	
2020	Most Wanted	Picker	
2021	Luca	Lorenzo Paguro	Voice role
2022	Hotel Transylvania: Transformania	Abraham Van Helsing	Voice role
2022	Collide	Peter	
2022	Linoleum	Cameron Edwin/Kent Armstrong	
2022	Susie Searches	Sheriff Loggins	
2023	Peter Pan & Wendy	Mr. Smee	
2024	Unfrosted	Edsel Kellogg III	
2024	Greedy People	The Irishman	
2024	Running on Empty	Barry	
2024	An Almost Christmas Story	Papa Owl	Voice role; short film
2025	Maintenance Required	Mr. Miller	

=== Television ===
Year	Title	Role	Notes
1998	Soul Man	Keats	Episode: "Raising Heck"
1998	Dr. Katz, Professional Therapist	Jim	Episode: "Old Man"
1998, 2009	Law & Order	Larry Johnson / George Rozakis	2 episodes
1998	Conrad Bloom	Oliver	Episode: "How Florrie Got Her Groove Back"
1999	LateLine	The Del-Ex Kid	Episode: "Pearce on Conan"
2000	Third Watch	Portis	Episode: "Journey to the Himalayas"
2000	Comedy Central Presents	Jim Gaffigan	1 episode
2000	Cry Baby Lane	Dan	Television film
2000–01	Welcome to New York	Jim Gaffigan	13 episodes
2001	Law & Order: Special Victims Unit	Oliver Tunney	Episode: "Countdown"
2001	Sex and the City	Doug	Episode: "Defining Moments"
2001–02	The Ellen Show	Rusty Carnouk	18 episodes
2002	Law & Order: Criminal Intent	Marty Palin / Russell Matthews	2 episodes
2003	Hope & Faith	Brad	Episode: "Anger Management"
2003–04	Ed	Toby Gibbons	4 episodes
2003–04	That '70s Show	Roy Keene	7 episodes
2004	Bad Apple	Butters	Television film
2004	Strip Search	Reverend Craig Peterson	Television film
2004	The Jury	Mr. Nifco	Episode: "Mail Order Mystery"
2005	Cheap Seats	Jerome Block	Episode: "Gimmick Sports"
2006	Love, Inc.	Jamie	Episode: "Anything But Love"
2006	Shorty McShorts' Shorts	Og, Henrichven (voice)	Episode: "My Mom Married A Yeti"
2006–09	My Boys	Andy Franklin	40 episodes
2009	Flight of the Conchords	Jim	Episode: "Murray Takes It to the Next Level"
2009	WordGirl	Mr. Dudley (voice)	3 episodes
2010	Bored to Death	Drug Counsellor	Episode: "Super Ray Is Mortal!"
2011	Royal Pains	Pete Stanbleck	Episode: "Astraphobia"
2012–13	Portlandia	Donald	2 episodes
2013–24	Bob's Burgers	Henry Haber (voice)	7 episodes
2014	Us & Them	Theo	2 episodes
2015	Wallykazam!	Mr. Trollman (voice)	Episode: "Rock and Troll"
2015–19	Star vs. the Forces of Evil	Father Time / additional voices	3 episodes
2015–16	The Jim Gaffigan Show	Himself	23 episodes; also co-creator, writer, executive producer
2016	Comedians in Cars Getting Coffee	Himself	Episode: "Stick Around for the Pope"
2017	Unbreakable Kimmy Schmidt	Officer Krupke	Episode: "Kimmy Bites an Onion!"
2017	Gilbert	Himself	Documentary
2019	Scooby-Doo and Guess Who?	Himself (voice)	Episode: "The Fastest Fast Food Fiend!"
2021	Stargirl	Thunderbolt (voice)	2 episodes
2021	Rick and Morty	Hoovy (voice)	Episode: "Mort Dinner Rick Andre"
2022	Reindeer in Here	Santa Claus (voice)	Television special
2023	Full Circle	Manny Broward	Miniseries
2024	Jersey Shore: Family Vacation	Himself	Episode: "Jets Day"
2024	Hit-Monkey	Snail (voice)	Episode: "Never Too Late"
2024	Saturday Night Live	Tim Walz	4 episodes

== Awards and nominations ==
On April 26, 2014, Gaffigan received the award for Concert Comedian at the American Comedy Awards for his work.

In 2007, Pale Force was nominated for a Daytime Emmy for Outstanding Broadband Program in the Comedy category. Gaffigan served as executive producer, writer, and lead actor.

In 2016, he won the Daytime Emmy Award for Outstanding Morning Program for his contributions as a commentator to CBS Sunday Morning.

=== Grammy Awards ===
The Grammy Awards are awarded annually by the National Academy of Recording Arts and Sciences. Gaffigan has been nominated eight times.

Year	Category	Nominated work	Result	Ref.
2013	Best Comedy Album	Mr. Universe	Nominated	
2015	Best Comedy Album	Obsessed	Nominated	
2018	Best Comedy Album	Cinco	Nominated	
2019	Best Comedy Album	Noble Ape	Nominated	
2020	Best Comedy Album	Quality Time	Nominated	
2021	Best Comedy Album	The Pale Tourist	Nominated	
2023	Best Comedy Album	Comedy Monster	Nominated	
2025	Best Comedy Album	The Prisoner	Nominated	
