= Pale Force =

Pale Force was a series of short animations starring Jim Gaffigan that aired on Late Night with Conan O'Brien. Its humor was derived from "paleness" of both Gaffigan and O'Brien, as well as from portraying Conan as a weakling to poke fun at the real-life TV host on his own show. The animation was done by New Yorker cartoonist Paul Noth, and the original music was done by Patrick Noth.

== Synopsis ==
Jim Gaffigan and Conan O'Brien are a crime-fighting duo with the "superpower" of paleness. They can also shoot lasers out of their nipples. They fight criminals such as Lady Bronze ("voiced by Eartha Kitt") and Philip Seymour Hoffman (who looks like Gaffigan). While there are a multitude of characters in the animations, most of the voice acting is done by Gaffigan. While Gaffigan is drawn as a muscular, tall man, O'Brien is scrawny and always crying and saying lines such as "Jim, help me!", and often wetting himself.

All the episodes are available on Pale Force's website, while some (usually the first part of a story) are shown when Gaffigan appears on O'Brien's show as guest. There, most of the dialogue between the two consists of Gaffigan trying to explain to O'Brien that his character is pivotal in the show. O'Brien frequently complains about how wimpy and incompetent his character is (he is not involved in the creation of the animation). One of Gaffigan's retorts to this was "if it's not true to life, people won’t believe it."

== Episodes ==
=== Episode 1 & 2: Meet Pale Force ===
The first episode of Pale Force opens with two robbers stealing a diamond. Jim and Conan shine their chests at the robbers and blind them with whiteness. Later, Lady Bronze, the main villain in the series, captures Conan and Jim comes to save him. It is ended on a cliffhanger with Lady Bronze saying "Jim don’t kill me, I love you," to which he responds "You don’t love me, you love crime."

=== Episode 3 & 4: Pale Force Begins ===
Jim introduces this episode as how Conan joined Pale Force. It starts with Conan watching Pale Man, which is a show only starring Jim and has a different theme song. Conan then leaves his house and is bullied by children about half of his size. Jim then saves Conan and teaches him to use his pale power. Jim presents him to the Legion Of Pale (name reminiscent to the Legion of Doom), with members such as Ron Howard, The White Stripes, Larry Bird, Nicole Kidman, John McCain, Santa Claus, Sir Elton John, Chris Matthews, The State of Utah, a polar bear, Philip Seymour Hoffman and Richie "LaBamba" Rosenberg (who is not actually pale but makes a quip about Conan). Lady Bronze captures the duo later in the episode, and Conan saves them by breaking the machinery they are tied to through urination.

=== Episode 5 & 6: Pale Imposter ===
In this episode Philip Seymour Hoffman seeks revenge on Jim for having to live in his shadow. He decides to use his "acting powers" to imitate Jim and give him a bad reputation. After Hoffman successfully touts about town drinking alcohol and doing other questionable activities dressed as Jim, it is necessary for Jim to be presented in front of the Legion of Pale, where he is banished to the shade cave. At the cave, Hoffman (dressed as Jim) is about to blow up the cave when Conan comes out, thoroughly confused. Jim comes out of the cave, and Conan, now with a revolver in his hand, must decide which one is the imposter and which is the real Jim. They go back and forth saying "facts" about Conan that are generally very wimpy attributes such as "you have ambiguous genitalia." Jim saves the day because Conan's gun is made of chocolate.

=== Episode 7 & 8: Sidekicks ===
Distraught, Conan finds solace in a sidekick support program, featuring Art Garfunkel, Chewbacca, Max Weinberg, and Robin. Conan reveals that he feels unequal to Jim after Jim's image is added to Mount Rushmore when Pale Force saves President Lincoln's sculpture from being vandalized. Meanwhile, Conan only is given a small, embarrassing statue. Conan regains confidence when Jim shows up to the sidekick support program and says he always felt like he was Conan's sidekick. Jim declares that both members of Pale Force will be treated as equals. Jim then goes to Mexico in a Conan-powered-rickshaw.

=== Episode 9, 10 & 11: Miss Massachusetts ===
Jim goes to the Legion of Pale with some disturbing information. Once-pale stars Lindsay Lohan, Scarlett Johansson and Clay Aiken have all become strikingly tan over the last year and have also become increasingly promiscuous. Their connection- they were all participants in the Miss Pale America pageant. Jim nominates Conan to infiltrate the pageant dressed in drag to retrieve valuable information. Nicole Kidman, Gwyneth Paltrow, Bette Midler, Christina Ricci and Sarah Vowell take Conan shopping. After a musical montage, Conan only needs to don a dress and a pair of earrings in order to pass off as a woman.

Once at the competition, a doctor announces that in addition to the drug screening, there were no irregular testosterone levels in any contestant, therefore, no competitor had a penis or testicles, much to Conan's chagrin. When other Miss Pale America contestants make fun of Conan's hair, he runs off crying. Once outside, Conan is encountered by Wilmer Valderrama who forces Conan to get into his car. Jim and Larry Bird watch the situation unfold from a Wonder Bread van.

The Miss Pale America Pageant begins with a monologue by Vladimir Putin. Conan plays Danny Boy on a glass harp and ribbon dances for the talent portion of the competition. Judges Ed Begley, Jr., Elijah Wood and Wilmer Valderrama unanimously crown Conan the winner. After the competition, Wilmer Valderrama propositions Conan to make good on his promise and become tan. Jim interrupts and punches Valderrama out. Conan then gives Jim his victory bouquet which Jim proceeds to eat.

=== Episode 12: Charlie Rose ===
Jim and Conan appear on the PBS talk show, Charlie Rose. Rose incessantly interrupts and asks banal questions of the duo. Then, he announces that the country of Afghanistan has changed its name to "Gafganistan". Rose reveals that he had recently done interviews with Pale Force's nemesis Lady Bronze. Bronze says that she only hates pale people and that shouldn't take away from all of the work she's done for non-pale children. During the flashback, Rose rolls another tape of his interview with a USB port. During this flashback, Rose says that two years from this point he will be interviewing Pale Force. The show returns to a dumbfounded Pale Force. Rose then bids his audience adieu and the show closes.

=== Episode 13 & 14: Conan and the King ===
While cleaning the Shade Cave, Conan discovers a time machine. Jim scolds Conan for touching it, saying it is needed to fight crime in the future. Conan wishes he could be in a world where people would appreciate him as he accidentally trips the switch on the time machine and is transported to 17th century England. Conan arrives naked in the year 1665 inside of Buckingham Palace. He hops into an oakley, where he changes into traditional (and flamboyant) clothing. Three dandies admire Conan for his femininity and pale complexion. Conan enjoys the newfound attention and exclaims, "Wow, real friends!" Conan becomes part of a eunuch choir which performs in front of the royal family. Conan is locked in the Tower of London where bobbies tell him that he will be there until he is skin and bones and in a pool of his own urine, to which Conan cries, "I already am."

Conan has a hallucination about Cinderella, but quickly wakes up to a kiss from a fellow prisoner. Meanwhile, Jim travels back in time and poses as a statue. He then steals a suit of armor and breaks Conan out of prison. The duo is confronted by the king who propositions Conan to stay in an age where pale, effeminate men rule the world and wetting one's breeches is a sign of sophistication. Jim questions who will do his ironing, prompting Conan to agree to go back to modern times. Conan cleans the Shade Cave while Jim takes a hot tub with Wonder Woman.

=== Episode 15 & 16: Conan in Love ===
Conan has a chat with a woman online and falls in love instantly. He thinks it's some pretty woman when the woman sends a picture of a stick figure drawing. It turns out to actually be Lady Bronze. Jim, who is in the hot tub with The Mona Lisa, George Bush, Laura Bush, and The Scream, tells Conan to take it slow, after all he's been married to Yoko Ono, Tom Arnold and Sally Jessy Raphael.

When she goes over to The Shade Cave, she tricks him and traps him. Jim, however, comes to the rescue and makes a spoof of To Catch a Predator from Dateline NBC. It ends in hilarity when Stone Phillips turns out to be a R2-D2 and his head falls off, but is on a spring.

=== Episode 17, 18 & 19: Pale Christmas ===
In a parody of It's a Wonderful Life, Conan greets everybody in town with "Merry Christmas!" on Christmas Eve (similar to Jimmy Stewart near the end of the movie). However, he is mocked by everybody (including Jesus and Rudolph the Red-Nosed Reindeer) for his paleness, and fired by boss Jeff Zucker (in a wheelchair a la Mr. Potter) as he says "I'm Jewish, you moron, you just lost The Tonight Show!" With his holiday spirit broken, Conan arrives at a bridge and meets Jimmy Stewart, who greets him with "What's the matter little girl?" and tells him "Why don't you jump off the bridge and kill yourself? That's what I'd do you pale freak." At this moment Conan wishes he had never been pale. Suddenly his skin becomes tanned, and Jim appears to show him what Conan's life would be if he had never been pale. First he takes him to the set of Late Night with Conan O'Brien, but instead of Conan, the host is now Howdy O'Doody. He continues to tell him that he never went to Harvard because he was so popular in High School. Jim then tells him that he is one of the hosts of The View. When Conan says "A host of The View what could possibly be more humiliating.", Death shows him his tombstone which reads "Conan O'Brien - Fired from 'The View'", next to Star Jones and others who were also fired. Conan then wishes that he was pale again. A slice of white bread then appears and says that it's his "Fairy White Bread" and that to be pale again Conan must eat him with Mayo. Conan becomes pale again and starts to sing "Christmas is the Palest Time of Year" with other pale people.

=== Episode 26: The Cliffhanger ===
While Jim is having a party in the hot tub, Conan is sitting aside reading a book, entitled "Starting Puberty in Your 40's". A stray beach ball bounces out of the hot tub and lightly taps Conan on the head, knocking him unconscious. He is then seen in a hospital bed, the doctor announces that Conan is in a coma, is completely pale, has complete muscle atrophy and severe retardation. The doctor then states that he's "never seen a recovery from someone this weak and this untalented." In this episode Conan finds out he has a long lost brother named Eric Ochoa, the most pale of all. He secretly fights crime in the west coast known as the "pale Kight". Jim then starts reminiscing about the "good times" they had together, Most of which involve O'Brien either wetting himself or running scared. One of the machines starts beeping and a nurse explains that his urine count is off the chart, and suggests that giving Jim a spongebath Would help. It then turns to a Fox news report by Greta Van Sustren, saying that Writer, Actor, Comedian Jim Gaffigan's Lesser Known Sidekick, Conan O'Brien, has fallen into a severe coma, and that petitions have been circulating to pull the plug as soon as possible, it then shows Jay Leno passing a petition around the crowd. She then reports that Conan is sure to die unless he personally funds another series of pale force...to be continued?

=== Episode 31, 32 & 33: Carnival Conan ===
When NBC President Jeff Zucker notices by reading a graph chart that Conan O'Brien is even less popular than cancer, Zucker, shown seated in a James Bond supervillain-style wheelchair, Zucker tricks Conan into visiting an old-fashioned carnival and abandons him there. At first, Conan is charmed by sightings of B.D. Wong, but soon realizes Zucker has abandoned him and that he is alone. Terrified, he screams at and flees from, in succession, a clown, a harmless child with a balloon, and a potted flower; but at the brink of despair he finds himself counseled by kindly puppet "Slimon the Fox", "Max the Giant", red-haired and pale female puppet Coneena, and their leader. The puppets sing Conan a cruel, faux Generation-X childhood-style song about self-love.

Lyrics to first verse of the puppet self-love song:

"You're weird and weak and have no friends / And so you're feeling blue / But if you sing this song with us / Your mood will slightly improve."

Conan sings a self-referencing stanza of the song, then he and the puppets join in singing together. A crowd gathers, with one woman remarking to her husband, "Look, honey. That manchild thinks the puppets are real." But the crowd is entertained and throws a large amount of money in a bucket in front of the puppet theatre to show its approval. The puppet show owner, a balding, rotund, swarthy-skinned character named Calzone, notices and soon offers Conan a curate's egg agreement to continue to work for him. At first Conan is intrigued, but he opts instead to leave the puppet show and return as Jim's sidekick. When Calzone overhears Conan apologizing to, and preparing to leave, Coneena the puppet, he quickly assembles a pitiful Jim sock puppet and deceives Conan into climbing into a birdcage. Foolish Conan climbs in, and Calzoni activates a padlock, trapping him inside. Conan despairs.

Meanwhile, Jim suspects Zucker and demands in Zucker's office to know what happened to Conan. When Zucker demurs that Conan must be "just out picking daisies", skeptical Jim grabs Zucker by the lapels and demands more forcefully to know where Conan is, calling Zucker a "silly, stupid old man". This scene continues NBC's long legacy of lampoon-friendly NBC executives playing along with the irreverent show gags that reference them . After telling an initial lie, Zucker admits he left Conan at the carnival - to which Jim replies, "Again?"

Jim immediately rushes to the scene of the carnival. After mistaking several other red-topped, pale carnival fixtures for his companion, and mistaking the squeak of a rocking carnival ride for Conan's voice crying "Jim! Help!", he spots Conan performing a terrible self-mocking song (written to resemble "I've Got No Strings" sung by the Walt Disney version of Pinocchio) onstage for Calzone and an adoring crowd. Jim intervenes, and Conan, set free, apologizes to Coneena and leaves. Conan references the 2007 Writers Guild of America strike in his final statements to Calzone, stating "I'm a talented artist who deserves respect and fair compensation. I'm not just a tool for you to use to make money." This scene is barely ended when it is segued immediately to a scene of Zucker happily counting money while Conan sits humbled atop his desk, comedically neutering the WGA strike and its implied position.

When Zucker comes across a fake coin, he then awards it to Conan as his piece of "NBC profits". Conan naïvely accepts it, overjoyed, and the episode and series ends .

== Members of the Legion of Pale ==
- Larry Bird
- David Caruso
- Goth girl community rep
- Philip Seymour Hoffman
- Ron Howard
- Sir Elton John
- Nicole Kidman
- Chris Matthews
- Senator John McCain
- Bette Midler
- Billy Flyswat
- Gwyneth Paltrow
- Edgar Allan Poe
- Christina Ricci
- Richie "LaBamba" Rosenberg
- Colonel Sanders
- Stephen Colbert
- Santa Claus
- Talking polar bear
- The State of Utah
- Sarah Vowell
- The White Stripes, also shown separately as Meg White and Jack White
- Steven Wright

== Other prominent persons featured ==
- Jay Leno (The Cliffhanger)
- Jeff Zucker (Pale Christmas)
- Max Weinberg (Pale Christmas)
- George Bailey (Jimmy Stewart) (Pale Christmas)
- Howdy Doody (Pale Christmas, Known as Howdy O'Doody)
