= The New Way Out =

Studio album by Rustic Overtones
- Released: November 11, 2009
- Recorded: 2008–2009
- Genre: Rock, jazz, soul, funk, ska
- Length: 61:02
- Label: Independent
- Producer: Rustic Overtones

Rustic Overtones chronology
| Light at the End (2007) | The New Way Out (2009) | Let's Start a Cult (2012) |

The New Way Out is the sixth studio album by the Portland, Maine, band Rustic Overtones, released on November 11, 2009. Recorded throughout 2008 and 2009, the album is the band's first since the departure of keyboard player Spencer Albee, and their first full-length release of all-new material since ¡Viva Nueva!. With just over an hour of music, the album is the band's second longest after Long Division and features the most experimental work of their career.

== Background and recording ==
In 2008, the band set out to start recording their first full-length album of new material since 2001's ¡Viva Nueva!. (Some of Light At The End's music was previously recorded before the band broke up in 2002, and all but four songs had been previously played live before the break-up.) On September 17, 2008, the band announced on their Myspace that Albee, their keyboard player since 1995's Long Division had left the band. Drummer Tony McNaboe explained that Albee was leaving on good terms, and that the album would continue as planned with multi-instrumentalist Nigel Hall from Lettuce filling in on keyboards. On October 17, 2008, the band premiered the song "The Smallest Spark" at The Asylum in Portland, the first new song of the album to be played live. Word on the new album was scarce until February 4, 2009, when Dave Gutter announced the names of a few new songs that would eventually appear on the album (such as "The Downside Of Looking Up", "Arizona", "The Same Does Not Apply" and "Nuts And Bolts") along with a tentative track listing. Gutter also explained that the band was experimenting with many different instruments not typical of normal Rustics Overtones albums, which would become apparent in the final album's overall sound.

Little was heard from the band about the new album until August 2009 when the song "The Same Does Not Apply" was premiered on local alternative rock station WCYY. In mid-August, the band held a cowbell-playing competition in which the winner would play onstage with the band to the song at its debut at the Machigonne Music Festival on August 29, 2009. At the festival, the band premiered the songs "Arizona", "Like The Blues", "Kathleen Caffeiene", "The Downside Of Looking Up" and "The Same Does Not Apply", closing with a full-band version of "The Smallest Spark". On October 16, 2009, Gutter announced that the album would be named The New Way Out, and would be released on November 11. He went on to explain that over the past two years, the band had been constructing its own brand-new recording studio in which to record the album, and that the album was self-produced by the band members. Referring to the recording process, he explained that "We spent the last two years writing and recording The New Way Out and at times it seemed longer. We have always celebrated our democratic approach to writing and recording. Siting the "compromise" of our creative process as our strength. While making this record that "compromise" was really put to the test." The album was released on Digipak CD to all Bull Moose Music stores four days early on November 7, 2009, to coincide with their show at the Paradise Rock Club in Boston, Massachusetts.

== Artwork ==
The artwork for the album is once again done by long-time collaborator Patrick Corrigan, a popular Portland artist and member of Seekonk. The overall style is very similar to the original independent release of Light At The End, with an aesthetic similar to that of pencil drawing in a sketchbook. The inner artwork features a few references to the art from Light At the End, including a man dressed in a rabbit suit and two canoers in a psychedelic landscape. The drawing also features a metal boot with wings, a reference to the artwork for the Rooms by the Hour song "Iron Boots".

== Reception ==
Professional ratings
Review scores
| Source | Rating |
|---|---|
| Boston Herald | (A) |

Initial reception to the album was positive. The Boston Herald praised the album's mix of "Beatles-reminiscent psychedelia, multi-layered orchestral pop and huge-eared references to everything from Pink Floyd to Coldplay and Radiohead - all of it wrapped around one warm, captivating melody after another", giving the album an "A" and calling it their "magnum opus - a great piece of work in every way." The Portland Phoenix also praised the album's "textured and dense amalgam of the collected band’s many tastes and endeavors", although it noted that the sound "is far from that core of primal energy that launched the band and drove it to its many heights" and the reviewer remarked that, "I just have to admit I wish this new album had elements of both. I’m awed. I’m amazed. But I’m not bathed in sweat." In a list of the top ten greatest local albums of the decade, the Phoenix ranked New Way Out at number one, calling it "hands-down the crowning local music achievement of the decade", and claiming that "if there is any justice in the musical cosmos, this album will break them nationally."

== Track list ==
All tracks are written by Rustic Overtones.

| No. | Title | Length |
|---|---|---|
| 1. | "New Way Out" | 3:48 |
| 2. | "Everybody Needs To Be Somebody's Friend" | 4:36 |
| 3. | "Nuts And Bolts" | 7:52 |
| 4. | "All Together" | 3:59 |
| 5. | "Like The Blues" | 6:48 |
| 6. | "Downside Of Looking Up" | 4:25 |
| 7. | "Love And A 45" | 3:55 |
| 8. | "Kathleen Caffeine" | 4:13 |
| 9. | "I Just Can't Shake You" | 5:14 |
| 10. | "The Same Does Not Apply" | 3:41 |
| 11. | "Common Cold" | 3:31 |
| 12. | "Arizona" | 4:04 |
| 13. | "The Smallest Spark That Beat The Sun" | 4:56 |
| Total length: | | 61:02 |

== Personnel ==
- Dave Gutter – lead vocals, guitar, ukulele and lyrics
- Jon Roods – upright bass, electric bass, keyboard, percussion, vibraphone, bells, guitar, vocals and recording
- Ryan Zoidis – alto saxophone, tenor saxophone, baritone saxophone, keyboards, percussion, vocals, string/horn arrangements, and sound engineering
- Tony McNaboe – drums, percussion, keyboards and vocals
- Jason Ward – baritone saxophone, tenor saxophone, flute, clarinet and bass clarinet
- Dave Noyes – trombone, bells, vocals and string/horn arrangements
- Nigel Hall – keyboards and vocals
- John McClaine – trombone
- Mark Tipton – trumpet and flugel horn
- Peter Dugas – flute
- Lucas Desmond – alto saxophone and tenor saxophone
- Joe Parra – baritone saxophone
- Jaime Colpoys – trombone
- Angela Plato – trumpet and flute
- Michael Albert – oboe
- Nicole Ribata – flute
- Eric Ambrose – trombone
- Tyler Quist – keyboards
- Angela Doxsey – violin and vocals
- Evan Casas – vocals
- Chris Moulton – vocals
- Poverty – vocals
- Kenya Hall – vocals
- Jason Ingalls – timpani, vibraphone, bells and vocals
- Anna Maria Amoroso – viola
- Tim Garret – cello
- Heather Kahill – violin
- Julie Anderson – viola
- Lauren Hastings – violin
- Kallie Ciechomski – viola
- Emiley Thomas – cello
- Jim Begley – additional recording
- Jonathan Wyman – mixing
- Adam Ayan – mastering
- Patrick Corrigan – artwork
