= Light at the End =

Studio album by Rustic Overtones
- Released: July 24, 2007
- Recorded: Spring 2007
- Genres: Rock, jazz, soul, funk, ska
- Length: 40:59
- Label: Velour Music
- Producers: Jon Wyman and Tony Visconti, with Rustic Overtones

Rustic Overtones chronology
¡Viva Nueva! (2001)	Light at the End (2007)	The New Way Out (2009)

Light at the End is a 2007 studio album by the Portland, Maine band Rustic Overtones, the first album by the band since its break-up in 2002. The album was recorded in spring 2007 and released on July 24, 2007. It has become the fastest-selling local disc ever in the state of Maine. Songs on the album include the title track as well as the new song "Troublesome" and the previously unreleased fan favorite "Rock Like War", both of which were premiered on WCYY the day that the band announced their first patio show since their break-up. With only eleven tracks and a length of just over 40 minutes, the album is the band's shortest to date.

== Background and recording ==
After five years of pursuing separate projects such as Spencer Albee's band As Fast As, Dave Gutter and Jon Roods' band Paranoid Social Club and Tony Mcnaboe's solo album Destination, members of the band spontaneously came into Portland's WCYY studio one day in May 2007 to announce that the band was going to reunite for the summer and play some shows at Portland club The Asylum. According to an article in the Portland Press Herald, drummer Tony Mcnaboe called each of the band members separately that spring and told each member that the others had already agreed to a reunion, thus tricking the members of the band into reuniting. A few weeks after, the band announced that they planned to release a new album, the first since 2001's ¡Viva Nueva!, of old material that had been left off previous releases and new material that the band was working on. The band recorded the album all through May and June at The Halo Studios in Westbrook, Maine. They then came back to WCYY to announce that they were to play at a WCYY Patio Show in July and premiered newly written song "Troublesome" and newly recorded fan favorite "Rock Like War". In late June, the band released a sampler of 12 songs from their new album, Light at the End, one of them being the later omitted "Last Night's Band". In early July, the final track list (minus the bonus track "Happy") was posted on Bull Moose Music's website along with the cover art and a link to pre-order the album. The band released the album on July 24, 2007, to all ten Bull Moose Music stores across the state the day of a special in-store acoustic performance.

== Musical style and lyrics ==
'Hardest Way Possible'
"Hardest Way Possible."

Consisting mainly of songs that the band had written in various eras of their pre-breakup career, Light at the End has one of the band's broadest and most diverse collections of musical styles and influences. The album's opening song, "Rock Like War", has a mainly hard rock first half, although the song later abruptly switches into a lighter, more upbeat second section that is made possible by the band's addition of a two-part string section. The guest strings are also used heavily in the album's other hard rocker, "Oxygen". The band's third version of "Hardest Way Possible", a song that appeared in different versions on Rooms by the Hour and ¡Viva Nueva!, appears on the album in the form that the band said they always wanted to record it, beginning with a Mellotron playing the string harmony that appears later in the song. The horns are playing a new arrangement, having a sound reminiscent of 1960s Stax/Volt. In all, the album has a much more toned down, less overly produced feel to it than the band's final pre-break-up release, ¡Viva Nueva!.

Lyrically, the album is mainly similar to other Rustic Overtones releases, with many songs, such as "Black Leather Bag" and "Carnival", telling the cryptic and often nonsensical stories of romantic situations. "Letter to the President", played with only bass guitar, guitar, xylophone and ukulele, is very much a departure from most of the band's other songs, as it has the most overtly political lyrics on the album and perhaps anything they have released before. "Light at the End" has mainly inspirational lyrics, saying that "all things they turn around", perhaps symbolizing the band's hopes that they will succeed now that they are back together. "Happy", a fan favorite that was left off ¡Viva Nueva, also implies the band's happiness with reuniting with its optimistic lyrics describing the band's friendship.

== Album art ==
The art for Light at the End is by the popular Portland artist Patrick Corrigan, the artist behind the band's artwork for their 1998 release Rooms by the Hour. The design is in black pencil, unlike the color artwork for Rooms by the Hour. The cover is of a cockroach with a frowning mask of Melpomene, the Muse of Tragedy, on its back inside a glass jar with its cover removed. The same cockroach appears on the back of the cover outside of its jar, and the track list of the album is written along its antennae. The inside art mostly consists of a gigantic scene scanned from Corrigan's sketchbook (apparent from the visible binding rings on the left of the scene) of what appears to be a man dressed as a rabbit dragging another man dressed as a rabbit in a surreal forest scene. The two men dressed as rabbits have been made into a tour T-shirt, as has the cockroach.

== Reception ==
Professional ratings
Review scores
Source	Rating
AllMusic	4/5 stars
PopMatters	5/10
Portland Press Herald	(favorable)

Light at the End became the fastest selling local album in Maine history, according to Bull Moose Music, breaking the record previously held by the band's 2001 release, ¡Viva Nueva!. The CD was at the top of the store's sales charts for weeks, beating other summer hits from bands such as White Stripes, Smashing Pumpkins and T.I. "Rock Like War" received large amounts of airtime from WCYY, and was consistently in the station's "Top 5 at 5" contest (in which fans vote online for their favorite songs) for weeks after its release, usually at number one or two. Samples from "Light at the End" have been used as buffer music for The Laura Ingraham Show and WRKO's Red Sox coverage.

== Track listing ==
1. "The Calm" – 0:17
2. "Rock Like War" – 4:46
3. "Letter to the President" – 4:29
4. "Troublesome" – 2:59
5. "Hardest Way Possible" – 4:32
6. "Black Leather Bag" – 4:08
7. "Oxygen" – 4:12
8. "Carsick" – 3:24
9. "Carnival" – 3:58
10. "Light at the End" – 5:06
11. "Happy" – 3:12 (Bonus Track, not mentioned on CD cover)

=== Out-takes ===
Artwork for Velour re-release

- "Last Night's Band" – An older song that the band performed live during the ¡Viva Nueva! days, the song made it onto the original sampler on their Myspace page but was omitted from the album by the band. By request of Jon Roods, the song was released as a free download to fans.

== Velour Music re-release ==
On November 24, 2007, the band told the crowd at a show at the Portland club The Asylum that Light at the End was to be re-released on the band's new record label and would contain bonus tracks not included on the original release. On November 26, 2007, the band announced in a new biography on their Myspace that the album was to be released on Velour Music for the band's wide release, and also hinted that the band's entire back catalog would soon be available through independent re-release. The national release came on March 19, 2008, coinciding with the re-release of Long Division. The new version has new cover artwork by Patrick Corrigan of two rabbits navigating a large open body of water, although the inside artwork remains unchanged. It also has a new track listing, omitting "Black Leather Bag" and adding "Valentines Day Massacre", the same version featuring Imogen Heap that was first included on ¡Viva Nueva!, between "Light at the End" and "Happy".

== Release history ==
Region	Date	Label	Format	Catalogue number
Maine (Bull Moose)	July 27, 2007	Self-release	CD	
Worldwide (iTunes)	August 2007	Self-release	Digital download	
United States	March 19, 2008	Velour Music	CD	

== Personnel ==
- Dave Gutter – lead vocals and guitar
- Spencer Albee – backing vocals, piano, organ, synthesizers and percussion on "Letter to the President"
- Tony McNaboe – drums
- Jon Roods – bass guitar
- Jason Ward – baritone saxophone
- Ryan Zoidis – tenor saxophone and alto saxophone
- Dave Noyes – trombone and ukulele on "Letter to the President"
- Tony Visconti – producer (previously unreleased tracks from ¡Viva Nueva!)
- Jonathan Wyman – producer/engineer (new material)
- Patrick Corrigan – art work
