= Something Fierce =

Something Fierce may refer to:

== Book ==
- Something Fierce: Memoirs of a Revolutionary Daughter, by Carmen Aguirre 2011

== Music ==
- Something Fierce (band) Mitch Clem
- Something Fierce (album), album by Rocktopus 2003
- Something Fierce, album by Marian Call 2011
- "Something Fierce", song by Rocktopus from the album Something Fierce and Signature Half-Step a Retrospective 2000-2014
