= Spose =

American rapper (born 1985)

- Born: Ryan Michael Peters; July 1, 1985 (age 41); Portland, Maine, U.S.
- Origin: Wells, Maine, U.S.
- Genres: Hip-hop; alternative hip-hop; comedy hip-hop
- Occupations: Rapper; songwriter; record producer
- Years active: 2004–present
- Labels: Frothy Four, Universal Republic, P. Dank
- Website: www.sposemusic.com

Ryan Michael Peters (born July 1, 1985), better known by the stage name Spose, is an American rapper and record producer from Maine.

== Personal life ==
Peters was born in Portland, Maine. He grew up in Wells, Maine. He attended University of New Hampshire as an English major and later transferred to Suffolk University. Universal Republic Records offered him a record deal when he was two classes from graduating so he did not finish. He has four children, including a set of twins.

== Career ==
Although he began rapping in eighth grade, he did not pursue it as a career until after he graduated from Wells High School in 2004. As a teenager, he started a comedy hip-hop group with neighborhood friends, the Frothy Four.

Adopting the stage name Spose, he self-released his first album, Preposterously Dank in 2007. It was one of the best-selling albums at a local Bull Moose record store, which motivated him to continue making music. Spose released the We Smoked It All mixtape with rapper Cam Groves in 2009. He was named Maine's Best Hip-Hop Act at the WePushButtons Awards in 2008 and 2009. In 2010, he was voted Best Hip-Hop Act in Portland Phoenix's best music poll.

In January 2010 his single, "I'm Awesome" from We Smoked It All, received airplay on Maine radio stations. In February 2010, after the song caught on in other parts of the US, Spose signed a record deal with Universal Republic and announced that he would begin working on a music video.

In March 2010, the video was filmed in Wells at the town-owned activity center where Spose had his first concert at the age of 24. The video was released on April 14, 2010. "I'm Awesome" peaked at #37 on the Billboard Hot 100 and was certified gold in the United States, selling over 500,000 units. The song was known for its comedy hip-hop style. Spose later stated in an interview that he had left Universal in late 2010 without releasing anything with the label.

On October 25, 2010, Spose announced through a series of Facebook posts (which were linked to Twitter) that he felt that We Smoked It All Vol. 2 had too many original songs to be considered a mixtape. Partially because of this, he decided to create a project, Happy Medium, with many original songs that were originally supposed to be on We Smoked It All Vol. 2, in addition to other material. He also said that new songs from Happy Medium would be released at 4:20 PM Eastern Time every Wednesday up until the release of Happy Medium. On December 17, 2010, Spose released Happy Medium for streaming on his Facebook page. The physical album was released in Bull Moose stores in late December 2010, and it was released on iTunes in January 2011. We Smoked It All Vol. 2 was released intentionally on April 20, 2011, at midnight.

In January 2012, "I'm Awesome" became the theme to the comedy series Mr. D. Spose released the music video for his single "Pop Song" on February 22, 2012. He released his third album The Audacity!, on April 16, 2012, on iTunes. On October 24, 2012, Spose launched a crowdfunded fundraiser on Kickstarter to raise $25,000 to fund The Yard Sale. It was funded on November 23, 2012, raising $28,147.

The Peter Sparker Mixtape was released as a free download on June 10, 2013. Deluxe physical copies were sold at bullmoose.com. Dankonia, a mixtape entirely over Outkast instrumentals (with other connections to Outkast, such as the album title, named after Stankonia, which also shares the same release date as Dankonia) was released for free on October 31, 2013. A physical copy was released in limited numbers on bullmoose.com on November 5, and the Almost Complete Lyrics Book was released on November 29, also on the BullMoose website.

Spose released his fourth studio album, Why Am I So Happy?, on July 10, 2015. It features KGFREEZE, Renee Coolbrith, Kristina Kentigian, Shane Reis, Wax, Lyle Divinsky, Phil Divinsky, Dave Gutter, and Watsky. The album has 16 songs.

Alongside Cam Groves with features from DJ Foodstamp, Shane Reis, and Dave Gutter, Spose released We Smoked It All 3: The Album on November 28th, 2015. It was the first edition in the "We Smoked It All" series to be released as an album. It features 10 songs.

Spose released his sixth studio album, Good Luck With Your Life, on May 5, 2017. It has features from Shang-High, Cam Groves, J Spin, Dave Gutter, and "my wife". It features the popular songs Good Luck With Your Life and All You Need Is You, each amassing over 1 million Spotify streams. When it was released, it was locked in a mobile game The King Of Maine with an extra song, "I Wanna Keep It." The album features 13 songs.

On October 13, 2017, Spose released his seventh studio album, Humans (Album Made In 24 Hours). The album was actually finished in 20 hours, as mentioned on his personal X (then Twitter) account. The album was fully recorded and produced on October 6th, 2017 at The Halo, a recording studio in Windham, Maine. The project was an idea by Spose to make an album with minimal preparation in an under-24-hour span. Over 50 different musicians and producers assisted in the creation of the album, including Cam Groves, Dj Rew, Ock Cousteau, Ben Thompson, Armies, B. Aull, Da-P, and Sarah Violette. The album includes 10 songs.

Spose's seventh studio album, We All Got Lost, was released on November 16, 2018. It has features from Chris Webby, Lily Frost, J Spin, Sara Hallie Richardson, TheWorst, Lyle Divinsky, P.MO, Armies, and Grieves. The album has the popular song The Bugs Are Really Bad Out Here, which has amassed over 1 million Spotify streams. The album features 14 songs. He also released a childrens book in 2018, titled Pinecone Pete is Not Impressed.

Spose's first live album, Spose & The Humans "Live In Denver", was released on October 4, 2019. It was recorded at Herman's Hideaway in Denver, Colorado, on July 30, 2019. It features Spose and his backing band The Humans performing various songs of his, and has 22 songs.

The fourth installment of the We Smoked It All series and his eighth studio album overall, We Smoked It All 4 was released on November 1, 2019. It was released with Cam Groves, and has features from Bensbeendead., Lyle Divinsky, and Kristina Kentigian. The album has 11 songs.

On May 5, 2020, Spose released the EP Nonperishable. The EP has a single feature from Shane Reis, and features 7 songs. According to Spose, the EP is a collection of his then-unreleased songs.

Spose released his ninth studio album, Get Rich Or Die Ryan on October 20, 2021. It was announced to his personal YouTube channel on August 27, 2021. It includes features from Dominic Lavoie, Matt Giard, Crucify Aidan, Jeff Beam, Jay Caron, Termanology, Jarv, Anna Lombard, and .Jxck. The album features 27 songs, spanning two discs.

On March 14, 2024, Spose released his tenth studio album, What Could Go Wrong?. It features Matt Giard, Ian Matthew, Bensbeendead., and Angelikah Fahray. The album features 13 songs.

== Discography ==
Studio albums

Title	Album details
Preposterously Dank	Released: February 12, 2008; Genres: Hip-hop, alternative hip-hop, comedy hip-hop; Labels: P. Dank Entertainment; Track listing: 1. "Preposterously Dank"; 2. "Fuck It"; 3. "John Madden (feat. Cam Groves)"; 4. "Drugs, Girls, Money & Liquor"; 5. "Gobble a Dank"; 6. "Under Control"; 7. "God Damn"; 8. "Just an Emcee II"; 9. "To the Head"; 10. "That's That"; 11. "Outro"
Happy Medium	Released: January 10, 2011; Genres: Hip-hop, alternative hip-hop, comedy hip-hop; Labels: P. Dank Entertainment; Track listing: 1. "The Audacity!"; 2. "Happy Medium (feat. Stiky-1)"; 3. "The Cask"; 4. "Can't Get There from Here"; 5. "Pop Song"; 6. "All I Do Is Rhyme (feat. Cam Groves)"; 7. "Christmas Song"; 8. "(Peter Sparker) In This Bitch"; 9. "I'm Awesome (remix) [feat. Mac Lethal]"; 10. "Sketchball"; 11. "Into Spose (feat. Space vs Speed)"
The Audacity!	Released: April 17, 2012; Genres: Hip-hop, alternative hip-hop, comedy hip-hop; Labels: P. Dank Entertainment; Track listing: 1. "Blow My Candle Out"; 2. "2002"; 3. "Knocking on Wood"; 4. "Gee Willikers"; 5. "Million Dollar Bill"; 6. "Brain Not a Chain"; 7. "Jimmy!"; 8. "Smiley Face"; 9. "Swagless"; 10. "My Love in You"; 11. "In Conclusion"
Why Am I So Happy?	Released: July 10, 2015; Genres: Hip-hop, alternative hip-hop, comedy hip-hop; Labels: P. Dank Entertainment; Track listing: 1. "Prologue: Work in Progress (feat. KGFREEZE)"; 2. "Happy Right Now (feat. Renee Coolbrith)"; 3. "Feel Alright (feat. Kristina Kentigian)"; 4. "Lies Song (feat. Wax & Shane Reis)"; 5. "Greatest Shit Ever"; 6. "Thanks Obama (feat. Lyle & Phil Divinsky)"; 7. "Gesundheit"; 8. "Little Different / Obituary (feat. KGFREEZE)"; 9. "Kanye Go (feat. Dave Gutter)"; 10. "Work in Progress (feat. Shane Reis)"; 11. "The G.O.A.T."; 12. "Fearless! (Interlude)"; 13. "Why Am I So Happy? (feat. Renee Coolbrith)"; 14. "Alternative Radio"; 15. "Nobody (feat. Watsky)"; 16. "Good and You? (iTunes Exclusive bonus track)"
Good Luck With Your Life	Released: May 5, 2017; Genres: Hip-hop, alternative hip-hop; Labels: P. Dank Entertainment; Track listing: 1. "Anna Kendrick"; 2. "Another Man's Logo (feat. Shang-High)"; 3. "All You Need Is You (feat. Cam Groves & J Spin)"; 4. "Good Luck with Your Life"; 5. "Pretty Dope"; 6. "Buy Now"; 7. "Ayup"; 8. "Listen Up Bub"; 9. "Poof!"; 10. "Used To"; 11. "When I Was Broke (feat. Dave Gutter & my wife)" 12. "Speezus"; 13. "Checkers or Chess"
Humans	Released: October 13, 2017; Genres: Hip-hop, alternative hip-hop; Labels: P. Dank Entertainment; Track listing: 1. "Humans"; 2. "I Can't Get Mad (feat. Cam Groves)"; 3. "At the Motherf*&^ing Halo (feat. DJ Rew & Ock Cousteau)"; 4. "Andrew Jackson (feat. Ben Thompson)"; 5. "Shame on You (feat. B. Aull & Armies)"; 6. "Doesn't Quite Feel Like Maine (feat. DAP)"; 7. "Where Would I B Without U (feat. Sarah Violette)"; 8. "Give It Up (feat. Cam Groves, Shane Reis, Sarah Violette, Ock Cousteau, J Spin & Shang-High)"; 9. "Boston Kyrie (feat. J Spin & Shang-High)"; 10. "Humans Reprise"
We All Got Lost	Released: November 16, 2018; Genres: Hip-hop, alternative hip-hop; Labels: P. Dank Entertainment; Track listing: 1. "Your Twenties"; 2. "The Bugs Are Really Bad Out Here (feat. Lily Frost & Chris Webby)"; 3. "Loon Song"; 4. "Rabbit Hole"; 5. "Mirror Mirror (feat. J Spin); 6. "Going Home (feat. Sara Hallie Richardson)"; 7. "WHY DO I DO THIS TO MYSELF?!"; 8. "Brag Track"; 9. "I Will Let You Down (feat. theWorst)"; 10. "Drawing Board (feat. Lyle Divinsky)"; 11. "We All Got Lost"; 12. "Suicide Doors"; 13. "Mountaintop (feat. Armies)"; 14. "Take You Home (feat. Grieves)"
Get Rich Or Die Ryan	Released: October 20, 2021; Genres: Hip-hop, alternative hip-hop; Labels: P. Dank Entertainment; Track listing: 1. "Self Destruct (feat. Dominic Lavoie)"; 2. "Self Help!"; 3. "Here We Go Again (feat. Matt Giard)"; 4. "World War Blues"; 5. "Sieve"; 6. "It's Alive"; 7. "Alien (feat. Crucify Aidan)"; 8. "Beautiful Day To Do Nothing At All"; 9. "Dudes"; 10. "Motherfuckers (Bring You Down)"; 11. "Parking Lot (feat. Jeff Beam)"; 12. "Hey Big Guy"; 13. "Shining"; 14. "Still Sellin"; 15. "My Own Way (feat. Jay Caron and Bensbeendead.)"; 16. "Never Stop (feat. Termanology)"; 17. "Metal Band (feat. Jarv)"; 18. "Hypocrite"; 19. "Parasite (feat. Bensbeendead.)"; 20. "You Don't Get Me High (feat. Shane Reis & Anna Lombard)"; 21. "Gym (feat. .Jxck)"; 22. "Hotline"; 23. "Back in the Bag (feat. .Jxck)"; 24. "Better with Time"; 25. "Signing Off (feat. Bensbeendead.)"; 26. "Roll the Windows Up"; 27. "Close to Me (feat. Jeff Beam)"
What Could Go Wrong?	Released: March 14, 2024; Genres: Hip-hop, alternative hip-hop; Labels: P. Dank Entertainment; Track listing: 1. "No Complaints"; 2. "Wrong"; 3. "15 Years"; 4. "Floor"; 5. "Voice Memo 02 15 23"; 6. "Bottom Row"; 7. "Blanket (feat. Matt Giard)"; 8. "Make It Out Alive"; 9. "Move On"; 10. "Bright Side"; 11. "Bottom of the Ocean; 12. "Any Minute"; 13. "Love Me"

Collaborations

- We Smoked It All (with Cam Groves) (2009)
- We Smoked It All Vol. 2 (with Cam Groves) (2011)
- We Smoked It All Vol. 3: The Album (with Cam Groves) (2015)
- We Smoked It All Vol. 4 (with Cam Groves) (2019)
- For All The Moose (with Shane Reis) (2024)

Compilation albums

- The Yard Sale (2012)

Live albums

- Spose Unplugged (2013)
- Spose & The Humans Live In Denver (2019)

Mixtapes

- The Peter Sparker Mixtape (2013)
- Dankonia (2013)

Extended plays

- Good Luck With More Life (2017)
- Going Home (2018)
- Nonpersihable (2018)
- The American Flag is a Red Flag (2026)

Singles

Year	Title	Peak positions			Certifications	Album
Year	Title	US	US Pop Songs	CAN	Certifications	Album
2009	"I'm Awesome"	37	36	52	US: Gold	We Smoked It All
2009	"We Hate Money"	—	—	—		
2010	"Pop Song"	—	—	—		
2016	"All You Need Is You (feat. Cam Groves and J Spin)"	—	—	—		Good Luck With Your Life
2017	"Take You Home (feat. Grieves)"	—	—	—		We All Got Lost
2018	"Mountaintop (feat. Armies)"	—	—	—		We All Got Lost
2019	"We Back (feat. Bensbeendead.)"	—	—	—		We Smoked It All 4
2019	"Woops"	—	—	—		We Smoked It All 4
2019	"Four"	—	—	—		We Smoked It All 4
2019	"Higher Elevation"	—	—	—		We Smoked It All 4
2019	"Casey Mac's"	—	—	—		We Smoked It All 4
2019	"Eleven Thirty"	—	—	—		We Smoked It All 4
2019	"It's About Time (feat. Bensbeendead)"	—	—	—		We Smoked It All 4
2020	"Granted" (feat. J Spin)	—	—	—		
2020	"Off-Road" (feat. The Mallet Brothers Band)	—	—	—		
2020	"Home" (feat. J Spin)	—	—	—		
2020	"Clorox Bleach"	—	—	—		Nonperishable
2020	"Cooped Up" (feat. Ekoh)	—	—	—		
2020	"Turf" (feat. Jr Specs)	—	—	—		
2020	"Clocking Out" (feat. Mike Squires and P.M.O)	—	—	—		
2020	"Talk So Much" (feat. Chris Webby and Ekoh)	—	—	—		
2020	"Hard Cider Reminder" (feat. Pleasure Pete)	—	—	—		
2020	"Parasite" (feat. Bensbeendead)	—	—	—		Get Rich Or Die Ryan
2020	"Alien" (feat. Crucify Aidan)	—	—	—		Get Rich Or Die Ryan
2021	"Self Help!"	—	—	—		Get Rich Or Die Ryan
2021	"Hypocrite"	—	—	—		Get Rich Or Die Ryan
2021	"Hey Big Guy"	—	—	—		Get Rich Or Die Ryan
2021	"Self Destruct (feat. Dominic Lavoie)"	—	—	—		Get Rich Or Die Ryan
2021	"Close To Me (feat. Jeff Beam)"	—	—	—		Get Rich Or Die Ryan
2021	"Metal Band (feat. Jarv)"	—	—	—		Get Rich Or Die Ryan
2021	"Sieve"	—	—	—		Get Rich Or Die Ryan
2021	"Never Stop" (feat. Termanology)	—	—	—		Get Rich Or Die Ryan
2023	"Take Care Of Yourself (Spose Version)"	—	—	—		
2023	"15 Years"	—	—	—		What Could Go Wrong?
2024	"Any Minute" (feat. Matt Girard)	—	—	—		What Could Go Wrong?
2024	"Blanket" (feat. Ian Matthew)	—	—	—		What Could Go Wrong?
2024	"Wrong"	—	—	—		What Could Go Wrong?
2024	"Turns Out" (feat. Mike Squires)	—	—	—		
2024	"Father Time" (feat. Chandler and Fellair)	—	—	—		
2026	"A World Without Billionaires"	—	—	—		The American Flag is a Red Flag EP
2026	"Open Their Wallets"	—	—	—		The American Flag is a Red Flag EP
2026	"Chase's Getty"	—	—	—		
2026	"Off With Their Heads"	—	—	—		
"—" denotes releases that did not chart or have yet to chart.
