= Long Division =

Long division is the standard arithmetic procedure for dividing simple or complex multidigit numbers

Long Division may refer to:

- Long Division (Low album), 1995
- Long Division (Rustic Overtones album), 1995
- "Long Division", a song by Death Cab for Cutie from the 2008 album Narrow Stairs
- Long Division, a 2013 novel by Kiese Laymon
