= Love Is Not Enough =

Love is Not Enough may refer to:

- Love Is Not Enough (Converge album), 2026
- Love Is Not Enough (Spencer Albee EP), 2014
- Love Is Not Enough, debut album by Casey
- Love Is Not Enough (Vol 1) and Love Is Not Enough (Vol 2), 2022 EPs by Young Jonn
- "Love Is Not Enough", 2005 song by Nine Inch Nails from With Teeth
- "Love Is Not Enough", 2010 song by Yelawolf from Trunk Muzik
- "Love Is Not Enough", 2020 song by Lydia Loveless from Daughter
- "Love Is Not Enough", 1976 single by Splinter
- Love Is Not Enough, a 2001 film by Mark Norfolk
- Love Is Not Enough, a 2020 audiobook by Mark Manson

== See also ==
- "Love's Not Enough", 1979 song by New Zealand band Dragon
- "Love Isn't Enough", 2022 song by American rapper Kodak Black from Back for Everything
- When Love Is Not Enough: The Lois Wilson Story, a 2010 American biographical drama television film
