= Seekonk =

Seekonk may refer to:

- Seekonk, Massachusetts, a town in the United States
  - Seekonk High School
  - Seekonk Speedway
- Seekonk River, a body of water in Rhode Island, United States
- Seekonk (band), a rock band
