= Rustic Overtones =

American rock band

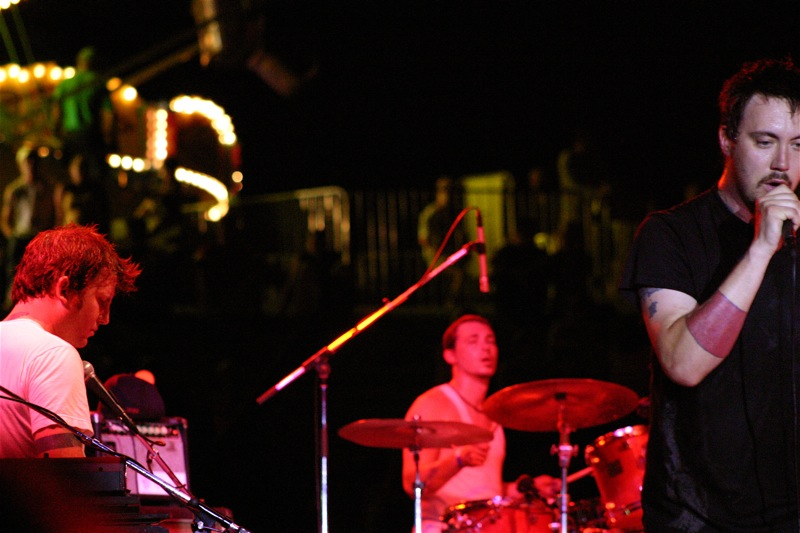
- Rustic Overtones at the 2007 Maine Lobster Festival

Background information
- Origin: Portland, Maine, United States
- Genres: Rock
- Instruments: Guitar; bass guitar; keyboards; drums; baritone sax; trombone; alto sax; tenor sax
- Years active: 1993–2002, 2007–present
- Labels: Ripcord; Arista; BMG; Tommy Boy; Warner Bros.; Velour
- Members: Dave Gutter; Jon Roods; Lucas Desmond; Jamie Colpoys; Gary Gemmiti; Jason Ward
- Past members: Spencer Albee; Tony McNaboe; Ryan Zoidis; Dave Noyes

Rustic Overtones is an American rock band from Maine, United States, active between 1993 and 2002 and from 2007 to the present. They were the first group to perform live on XM Satellite Radio, and their 2007 album Light at the End was the fastest-selling local disc ever in the state of Maine.

== History ==
=== Early years: 1993–2002 ===
Rustic Overtones started in the early 1990s as a three-piece cover band known as Aces Wild with Dave Gutter, Jon Roods, and then-drummer and close friend Matthew Esty, playing small bars. This lineup produced the Smile album. Rustic Overtones gained popularity during the mid to late 1990s in the Portland, Maine, music scene, although it had many self-financed tours throughout the country, mostly the northeastern states. After the release of the band's 1998 album Rooms by the Hour, major record label Arista signed the band spurred on by then-president Clive Davis. The signing led to "Hardest Way Possible," a song from Rooms By The Hour, being featured on the soundtrack of the Rob Schneider film The Animal. Arista hired producer Tony Visconti to produce what became the band's 2001 release, ¡Viva Nueva! However, after disagreements with the label, and a shakeup at Arista that saw the band's primary supporter, Clive Davis, depart, the record deal fell through. The band was shortly picked up afterward by Tommy Boy and released the album in 2001, which featured guest appearances by Funkmaster Flex, Imogen Heap, and David Bowie. However, Tommy Boy's deal with Warner Bros. Records ended in 2002, which once again left the band without a record label. The disappointment of two major record deals falling through proved too much for the band members, and they went their separate ways in 2002. Its final performance was a three-hour show at the State Theatre on May 11, 2002.

=== Break-up and solo careers: 2002–2007 ===
During the five years that the Rustic Overtones went their separate ways, most of the band members pursued a side project. Dave Gutter and Jon Roods met up with one-time Overtones drummer Marc Boisvert, and formed Paranoid Social Club, another band that enjoyed success, with its single "Wasted" appearing in the soundtrack to the movie Beerfest. Spencer Albee joined with other local musicians including guitarist Zach Jones, drummer Brian Higgins, and bassist Haché and formed Rocktopus (later As Fast As, replacing Higgins with drummer Andrew Hodgkins), whose album Open Letter to the Damned received a 4.5/5 rating from music critic giant Allmusic. Tony McNaboe served as a touring drummer for Ray LaMontagne, and released an R&B solo album in 2003 entitled Destination. In addition, saxophonist Ryan Zoidis split his time between Lettuce and Soulive, baritone saxophonist Jason Ward played with several local bands, and trombonist Dave Noyes joined local group Seekonk.

=== Reunion and Light at the End: 2007–2008 ===
In early spring of 2007, drummer Tony McNaboe began the process of reuniting the band, calling each former member separately, and telling them that everyone else had already agreed to a reunion. In May 2007, Tony McNaboe, Spencer Albee, and Jon Roods made a surprise announcement on Portland's WCYY that the entire band did indeed plan to reunite, and were in the process of scheduling local reunion shows. On May 29, they announced that they would play two reunion shows at Portland club The Asylum, on July 28 and 29, 2007. In addition, after a month of rumors and gossip, the band also announced that they had been working on a new album of previously unreleased material and newly written music, eventually titled Light at the End, which was released independently in late July 2007 coinciding with the two reunion shows.

Although the band originally made it clear that the reunion would only last for the summer, and the members would turn their attention back to their post-Overtones projects after the two shows and the release of the album, Gutter confirmed in an article for the Portland Press Herald that "reunions will become a regular thing" and that the band is "here to stay." Furthermore, during one of the band's reunion shows, Spencer Albee proclaimed, "we're never going to leave you again, we're sorry". Also, during an interview on a local news station on July 18, 2007, with Gutter and Albee, the two were asked what the future plans are with the band. Gutter responded with "we've got a couple more huge endeavors planned for Rustic Overtones" and Albee stated that "there's no reason to not be together".

On September 8, 2007, the band announced on their MySpace page that they were in the process of filming a "feature film documentary," though they did not announce a release date or filming timetable. On November 24, 2007, Spencer Albee announced to the crowd at an Asylum concert that the band would soon re-release the albums Long Division and Light At The End on a national record label to get the albums out to the masses. Two days later, the band announced on MySpace that the label they had signed with was Velour Records, and hinted that their entire back catalog of albums would soon be released.

=== Spencer Albee's departure and The New Way Out: 2008–2009 ===
On September 17, 2008, the band unexpectedly announced on Myspace that Spencer Albee, their keyboardist since 1995's Long Division, had left the band. Drummer Tony McNaboe explained that Spencer was parting ways on good terms, and that work on a new album would continue as planned with multi-instrumentalist Nigel Hall from Lettuce filling in on keyboards. Hall toured as a normal member of the band until he became too busy with other projects to continue as a full-fledged member, still contributing to the recording of the album. On tour the band began to alternate between Hall and Tyler Quist as keyboardists, playing some shows without a keyboardist at all, or having Ryan Zoidis and Dave Noyes take over keyboardist duties on certain songs. The band continued work on their album in their self-built studio, Limited Productions Limited, throughout 2008 and 2009, and on November 11, 2009, The New Way Out was released.

=== Death of Noyes and Self Titled: 2019 ===
On February 23, 2019, the band posted a short clip of a song titled "Black Shirt" to their Instagram account with an announcement of their forthcoming album. On March 7, trombonist Dave Noyes died unexpectedly. Hailed as an essential member of the band, he was called the "glue that held the band together." Multiple benefit shows were performed in his honor, as well as to raise funds for his bereaved pregnant wife and young child. On November 29, 2019, they released a self-titled album based on what Noyes had recorded before he died.

== Styles and influences ==
In its earliest days, Rustic Overtones was mostly classified as a rock and soul band, citing as their heaviest influences artists such as Earth, Wind, and Fire and Tom Waits, and playing with a raw sound. However, by Rooms by the Hour, the band refined and diversified its sound, with much more of a jazz influence on songs such as "Pink Belly" and "Machine Maker," and an alternative rock feel on songs such as "The Heist" and "Kicking and Screaming". By the late '90s and into the early 2000s, the band had become heavily influenced by hip hop, leading to the heavy production of the entire album, a collaboration with hip-hop veterans Naughty by Nature that appeared on the rap group's 1999 album, and the ¡Viva Nueva! song "Smoke", which when played sometimes featured a guest rapper friend of the band who rapped over an extended outro to the song. This shift in style contributed to tensions with Arista, as the label had expected the band's sound to remain similar to their older material. The album Light at the End sounds most similar to the production and style of Rooms by the Hour, although the album draws from various other phases of the band's earlier work as well.

== Members ==
Current

- Dave Gutter — Vocals, electric guitar (1993–2002, 2007–present)
- Jon Roods — Bass (1993–2002, 2007–present)
- Jason Ward — Baritone Saxophone (1995–2002, 2007–present)
- Gary Gemmiti — Drums (2015–present)
- Lucas Desmond — Alto Saxophone, Tenor Saxophone (2019–present)
- Jamie Colpoys — Trombone, Backing Vocals (2019–present)

Past

- Matthew Esty — Drums (1993)
- Tony McNaboe — Drums (1993–2002, 2007–2010)
- Dave Noyes — Trombone (1994–2002, 2007–2019; died 2019)
- Spencer Albee — Hammond B2 Organ, Fender Rhodes, Synth (1995–2002, 2007–2008)
- Ryan Zoidis — Alto Saxophone, Tenor Saxophone (1995–2002, 2007–2008)
- Nigel Hall — Keyboard (2014)
- Mike Taylor — Fender Rhodes, Keyboards (2015–2019)
- Kyle Hardy — Alto Saxophone
- Marc Boisvert — Drums

== Discography ==
=== Albums ===
- Shish Boom Bam (1994)
- Long Division (1995)
- Rooms by the Hour (1998)
- ¡Viva Nueva! (2001)
- Light At The End (2007)
- The New Way Out (2009)
- Let's Start a Cult (2012)
- Let's Start a Cult Part 2 (2013)
- Rustic Overtones (2019)

=== EPs ===
- My Dirt (1996)
- Check/Girl Germs (1997)
- Volume Up (1999)

=== Singles ===
- "Check" (1997)
- "Combustible" (2001)
- "C'Mon" (2001)
- "Light at the End" (2008)
- "Downside of Looking Up" (2009)
- "Martyrs" feat. Eric krasno (2014)
- "The Show Must go on" featuring Sara Hallie Richardson (2014)
- "Black Shirt" (2019)

=== Promotional recordings ===
(This is only a partial listing)

- This Is Rock N' Roll (promo tape) (2000)
- Viva Nueva! Album Advance (2001)
- Live on XM Satellite Radio (2001)
- Promotional Pre Release Viva Nueva! (Date Unknown — boilerplate Tommy Boy inserts are labeled 1997 and 1998, although they were with another label in '97/'98)
- Selections from the Album Viva Nueva! (2001)
