= Happy Medium =

Happy Medium, A Happy Medium, or The Happy Medium may refer to:

== Drama ==
- Happy Medium Theatre (also known as The Happy Medium), a theatre and night club in Chicago
- The Happy Medium, a 1909 play by Alice Chapin

== Film, radio, and television ==
- "Happy Medium", a 1983 episode of the sitcom Goodnight, Beantown
- "Happy Medium", a 2002 episode of the television comedy-drama Just Deal
- Happy Medium, a radio program on East Village Radio
- Happy Medium, a character in the 2018 film A Wrinkle in Time
- "A Happy Medium", a 2018 episode in the third season of The Real Housewives of Potomac
- "The Happy Medium", a 1967 episode of the sitcom Turn Out the Lights
- "The Happy Medium", a 1982 episode of Filthy Rich

== Literature ==
- Happy Medium, a character in the novel A Wrinkle in Time
- "The Happy Medium", the introduction to the book The Joy of Music

== Music ==
- Happy Medium (album), an album by the rapper Spose
- "Happy Medium", a song by Charles Earland on the 1971 album Soul Story
- "Happy Medium", a song by Ramin Djawadi on the 2018 film soundtrack A Wrinkle in Time
- "A Happy Medium", a song by Malcolm Middleton on the 2005 album Into the Woods
- "The Happy Medium", a song by Horace Silver on the 1970 album That Healin' Feelin'
- "The Happy Medium", a song by The Nightingales on the 1983 album Hysterics
- The Happy Medium, a 2000 EP by Hog Hoggidy Hog

== Other ==
- Happy Medium, a horse that won the Tingle Creek Chase in 1971

== See also ==
- Juste milieu
