= Spencer Albee =

American musician, producer, singer and songwriter

- Born: Spencer Aaron Albee; May 31, 1976 (age 50); Dover, New Hampshire
- Origin: Portland, Maine
- Genres: Rock; pop
- Occupations: Singer-songwriter; musician; producer
- Instruments: Vocals; keyboards; piano; guitar; bass; drums
- Years active: 1995–present
- Labels: Arista/BMG Records; Tommy Boy/Warner Bros. Records; Velour; A&M; Octone; Universal Music Group
- Formerly of: Rustic Overtones; As Fast As; The Popsicko; Space Versus Speed; Spencer and the School Spirit Mafia

Spencer Aaron Albee (born May 31, 1976) is an American musician, singer and songwriter from Portland, Maine. Albee has been part of the Portland music scene for over three decades. Previously, Albee fronted As Fast As and was the keyboardist and backup singer for the band Rustic Overtones. Albee released the solo album Spencer in July 2013.

== Early life ==
Albee was born in Dover, New Hampshire, and raised in the town of York, Maine, where he was influenced at an early age by his grandfather, a banjo player and music enthusiast. Early groups that influenced Albee included Paul McCartney, Harry Nilsson, Brian Wilson and David Bowie. In particular, Beatles bass player Paul McCartney left an indelible mark on Albee's musical development.

Albee was first introduced to the piano by his parents, and without much formal training picked up the instrument mostly by ear. From there he dabbled in guitar (playing right-handed despite being a natural lefty), bass, tuba, recorder, harmonica, and accordion. He also developed his voice by singing in his school's chorus.

== Musical career ==
At the age of 18, Albee dropped out of the University of Southern Maine to join the regionally popular Rustic Overtones as their keyboard player. His relationship with the band would last several years and give him the opportunity to work with the likes of David Bowie, Funkmaster Flex and Imogen Heap.

After Rustic Overtones broke up, Albee formed a solo effort he dubbed "The Popsicko", under the pseudonym "Frankenstein". Due to a variety of circumstances, the band Albee had assembled for the project only played a few gigs, and broke up quietly just months after inception. Albee's next endeavor was the much more successful Rocktopus, which recorded two albums and toured extensively. After the band's second album, Something Fierce, Albee changed the band's name to As Fast As. As Fast As released the critically acclaimed Open Letter to the Damned on A&M Octone Records and toured steadily behind it, crisscrossing the U.S. and Canada from 2004 to 2007.

Beginning in July 2007, Albee played with the reunited Rustic Overtones at concerts around New England following the independent release of Light at the End. On August 15, 2008, the Portland Phoenix reported that Albee had parted ways with Rustic Overtones, telling the paper, "I need a change of pace, as well as clarity and perspective. Since 1995, I've been on tour and making records constantly, and now I find myself seeking respite."

After the dissolution of As Fast As and his departure from Rustic Overtones, Albee formed Spencer and the School Spirit Mafia, and released "Candy, Cake and Ice Cream", followed by Space versus Speed's self-titled record. Then, in 2013, he released his first solo record Spencer.

In the fall of 2014 Albee released the solo EP Love is Not Enough.

His sophomore solo album Mistakes Were Made was released on April 28, 2015.

The soundtrack of Albee's song, Wait For The War, is played during the closing credits of the movie Night of the Living Deb (2015).

His third solo album Relentlessly Yours was released on May 16, 2017.

== Discography ==
With Rustic Overtones

| Title | Release date | Label |
|---|---|---|
| Long Division | 1995 | Ripcord Records |
| Rooms by the Hour | 1998 | Ripcord Records |
| ¡Viva Nueva! | 2001 | Tommy Boy/Warner Bros. |
| Light at the End | 2007 | Velour |

With Rocktopus/As Fast As

| Title | Release date | Label |
|---|---|---|
| I Love You! Good Morning! | 2002 | Independent |
| Something Fierce | 2003 | Independent |
| Open Letter to the Damned | 2004 | Independent |
| Open Letter to the Damned (re-release) | 2006 | A&M Octone Records |
| Destroy the Plastique Man | 2008 | Independent |
| AFA for Effort | 2009 | Independent |

Solo

| Title | Release date | Label |
|---|---|---|
| The Popsicko Vol. 1 | 2000 | Independent |
| Spencer | 2013 | Independent |
| Signature Half-Step a Retrospective 2000-2014 (Compilation) | 2014 | Independent |
| Love is Not Enough (EP) | 2014 | Independent |
| Mistakes Were Made | 2015 | Independent |
| Relentlessly Yours | 2017 | Independent |
| The Popsicko, Vol. 2 | 2020 | Independent |

With Spencer and the School Spirit Mafia

| Title | Release date | Label |
|---|---|---|
| Candy, Cake, & Ice Cream | 2009 | Independent |

With Space Versus Speed

| Title | Release date | Label |
|---|---|---|
| Space Versus Speed | 2010 | Independent |

With Bell Systems

| Title | Release date | Label |
|---|---|---|
| Three Songs to Dance To. (EP) | 2019 | Independent |
| Better Now (Single) | 2020 | Independent |

With Palomino Motel

| Title | Release date | Label |
|---|---|---|
| Make This Easy (Single) | 2022 | Independent |
