= Nothing Left to Lose =

Nothing Left to Lose may refer to:

== Literature ==
- Nothing Left to Lose (novel), a 2017 novel by Dan Wells
- Nothing Left to Lose, a 2012 novel by Allan G. Johnson
- Nothing Left to Lose: An Impolite Report On the State of Freedom in Canada, a 2020 book by Philip Slayton
- "Nothing Left to Lose", a short story by Diana Pharaoh Francis

== Music ==
=== Albums ===
- Nothing Left to Lose (Gary U.S. Bonds album) or the title song, 1996
- Nothing Left to Lose (Mat Kearney album) or the title song (see below), 2006

=== Songs ===
- "Nothing Left to Lose" (song), by Mat Kearney, 2006
- "Nothing Left to Lose", by the Alan Parsons Project from The Turn of a Friendly Card, 1980
- "Nothing Left to Lose", by American Hi-Fi from The Art of Losing, 2003
- "Nothing Left to Lose", by Buck-O-Nine from Sustain, 2007
- "Nothing Left to Lose", by Deepfield, 2011
- "Nothing Left to Lose", by Emma Paki from Oxygen of Love, 1996
- "Nothing Left to Lose", by Everything but the Girl from Fuse, 2023
- "Nothing Left to Lose", by Faron Young, 1965
- "Nothing Left to Lose", by Heaven's Basement from Filthy Empire, 2013
- "Nothing Left to Lose", by Jeremy Jordan and Eden Espinosa from Rapunzel's Tangled Adventure: Plus Est En Vous, 2020
- "Nothing Left to Lose", by Needtobreathe from The Heat, 2007
- "Nothing Left to Lose", by Nick Carter from I'm Taking Off, 2011
- "Nothing Left to Lose", by the Pretty Reckless from Light Me Up, 2010
- "Nothing Left to Lose", by Puddle of Mudd from Life on Display, 2003
- "Nothing Left to Lose", by Sad Café from Facades, 1979
- "Nothing Left to Lose", by Social Code from Rock 'n' Roll, 2009
- "Nothing Left to Lose", by Spencer Albee from Relentlessly Yours, 2017
- "Nothing Left to Lose", by Taxi Violence
- "Nothing Left to Lose", by Transit from Joyride, 2014
- "Nothing Left to Lose", by Wipers from Land of the Lost, 1986
- "Nothing Left to Lose", by Woe, Is Me from Genesis, 2012

== Television episodes ==
- "Nothing Left to Lose" (30 Rock)
- "Nothing Left to Lose" (Police Woman)
- "Nothing Left to Lose" (Side Order of Life)

== See also ==
- Nothing to Lose (disambiguation)
