= Happy Medium (album) =

Studio album by Spose
- Released: 2011
- Genres: Hip-hop; alternative hip-hop; comedy hip-hop
- Label: P. Dank

Spose chronology
We Smoked It All (2009)	Happy Medium (2011)	We Smoked It All 2 (2011)

Happy Medium is the follow-up album to Preposterously Dank by rapper Spose.

== Track listing ==
1. The Audacity! (Intro)
2. Happy Medium (ft. Stiky-1)
3. The Cask
4. Can't Get There From Here
5. Pop Song
6. All I Do Is Rhyme (ft. Cam Groves)
7. Christmas Song
8. (Peter Sparker) In This B****
9. I'm Awesome Remix (ft. Mac Lethal)
10. Sketchball
11. Hush (CD version only)
12. Into Spose (ft. Space vs Speed) (Includes hidden track "Watchin' Some TV")
