= Spencer (album) =

Studio album by Spencer Albee
- Released: July 9, 2013
- Recorded: 2012
- Genre: Indie rock
- Length: 39:12

Spencer Albee chronology
Space Versus Speed (2010)	Spencer (2013)	Signature Half-Step a Retrospective 2000-2014 (2014)

Spencer is the debut solo album and fourteenth studio album release overall by Spencer Albee. The album was announced in the summer of 2012 with a PledgeMusic campaign, and the track listing was announced on June 19, 2013. The album was released on July 9, 2013.

== Track listing ==
1. "It's Alive" - 3:55
2. "Lucky" - 5:14
3. "Macworth" - 3:16
4. "California's Calling" - 3:45
5. "Lost My Way" - 4:46
6. "Wait Through the War" - 4:27
7. "Sundown" - 3:45
8. "Nobody to Blame" - 3:18
9. "When Will I Die?" - 3:26
10. "Kiss Me Like a Stranger" - 3:20

== Release ==
Albee released previews for the songs in February 2013 and mixing was underway by May. After almost two decades as a lauded Portland, Maine musician, Spencer marked his solo debut.
