= Mistakes Were Made (album) =

Studio album by Spencer Albee
- Released: April 28, 2015
- Recorded: 2014–2015
- Genre: Rock, pop rock
- Length: 41:46

Spencer Albee chronology
Love is Not Enough (2014)	Mistakes Were Made (2015)	Relentlessly Yours (2017)

Mistakes Were Made is the second solo album and fifteenth studio album release overall by Spencer Albee. The album was released in stores on April 28, 2015, with a release party at Port City Music Hall on May 29, 2015.

== Track listing ==
1. "Mistakes Were Made" - 4:10
2. "So Bad (Open Letter to the Damned Part 2)" - 4:08
3. "I'm Right Here (feat. Kat Wright)" - 3:18
4. "Put Your Sweatshirt On" - 2:00
5. "Hold Me Close" - 2:48
6. "This Will Be Our Year" - 2:05
7. "Why Am I a Fool?" - 2:06
8. "Something Something Broken Heart" - 2:57
9. "One2three" - 4:32
10. "I Don't Know" - 2:58
11. "Love Is Not Enough" - 3:40
12. "So Long" - 2:26
13. "Come Home" - 4:38
