= Destroy the Plastique Man =

Studio album by As Fast As
- Released: March 11, 2008
- Genre: Power pop
- Label: Independent

As Fast As chronology
Open Letter to the Damned (2006)	Destroy the Plastique Man (2008)	AFA For Effort (2009)

Destroy the Plastique Man is the second album by As Fast As. Singer Spencer Albee stated regarding the album's recording process, "If at any point I felt we were just doing things automatically, I would stop the process and put the song away. I wanted to make a record that was completely outside of our comfort zone. One that would not only surprise listeners, but ourselves as well. I think we achieved that goal."

== Track listing ==
1. "Hey Kids!" - 0:29
2. "Homewrecker" - 4:01
3. "Beakless Bird (Jerking Off In A Paper Cup)" - 3:22
4. "Sleighjacking" - 4:06
5. "Your Lips To God's Ears" - 4:11
6. "Me Ow (Nobody Knows)" - 4:14
7. "Destroy the Plastique Man" - 4:39
8. "The Road To Hell" - 3:00
9. "What A Shame (Delicious Shame)" - 5:27
10. "Somebody's Fool" - 3:11
11. "Dancing a Murderous Tango" - 3:37
12. "Can I See You Tomorrow?" - 4:42
13. "For My Life" - 3:37
