= We Smoked It All =

Mixtape by Spose and Cam Groves
- Released: October 25, 2009
- Genres: Hip-hop; alternative hip-hop; comedy hip-hop
- Label: P. Dank

Spose and Cam Groves chronology
Preposterously Dank (2007)	We Smoked It All (2009)	Happy Medium (2011)

We Smoked It All is a 2009 collaboration mixtape by rappers Spose and Cam Groves, from the independent label P. Dank.

Tracks
# 1. Oh, Hey
# 2. Wells, Maine In The House
# 3. Boning & Smoking Chronic
# 4. A Dude Named Spose
# 5. Stand Still
# 6. I'm Awesome
# 7. Fast Food Pabst Blue
# 8. Hate My Job
# 9. A Way With Words
# 10. Live From 2009
# 11. Run
# 12. It's Alright With Me
# 13. Still Preposterous
# 14. Sexy John Madden
# 15. Born In The Burbs
