= I'm Awesome =

Single by Spose

from the album We Smoked It All
- Released: March 9, 2010
- Recorded: 2009
- Genre: Nerdcore, comedy hip-hop
- Length: 4:09
- Label: Universal Republic
- Songwriter: Ryan Peters
- Producer: Spose

Spose singles chronology
"I'm Awesome" (2010)	"We Hate Money" (2010)

"I'm Awesome" is a song written and recorded by American hip-hop artist Spose. The single debuted at number 54 on the Billboard Hot 100 on March 25, 2010, and reached #37 in its fourth week on the chart. The single has since gone gold for sales exceeding 500,000 units.

Originally self-released in January 2010, the song received significant airplay on radio stations in Spose's home state of Maine, and in February and March 2010 received airplay across the country. It was released at the iTunes Store on March 9, 2010. A music video was filmed in Maine shortly thereafter, and was released on April 14, 2010. In October 2010, an official remix for the song was recorded by Spose which features Kansas City–based rapper Mac Lethal as the official guest. In January 2012, "I'm Awesome" was used as a theme song for the show "Mr. D", a sitcom which aired on CBC, starring Gerry Dee.

== Chart performance ==
Chart (2010)	Position
Canadian Hot 100	52
US Billboard Hot 100	37
US Mainstream Top 40	36

== Certifications ==
Region	Certification	Certified units/sales
United States (RIAA)	Gold	500,000^{^}
^{^} Shipments figures based on certification alone.

== Release history ==
Release dates and formats for "I'm Awesome"
Region	Date	Format	Label(s)	Ref.
United States	March 15, 2010	Mainstream airplay	Universal Republic	
