= Long Division (Rustic Overtones album) =

Studio album by Rustic Overtones
- Released: 1995
- Recorded: Big Sound Studios, Westbrook, Maine
- Genre: Rock, jazz, soul, funk, ska
- Length: 67:11
- Label: Ripcord Records rr 101
- Producer: Colin Decker

Rustic Overtones chronology
Shish Boom Bam (1994)	Long Division (1995)	My Dirt (EP) (1996)

"Simple Song"
This sample of "Simple Song" represents the band's delving into a heavier rock sound that is found on much of the album and is expanded in later albums.

"Pop Trash"
"Pop Trash" represents the band's many sounds found on the album and on later releases, such as the ska sound that dominated Shish Boom Bam and Long Division, the funk feel that the band had developed in this album and would continue in Rooms by the Hour, and the rock feel that would be heavily expanded in ¡Viva Nueva!.

Long Division is the second album by the Rustic Overtones, originally released on November 17, 1995. At one hour and seven minutes, the album remains the band's longest release to date. "Simple Song", the second track from the album, received extensive airtime from Portland alternative station WCYY, and is largely responsible for the band's rise to prominence on the Portland music scene. The album remains a fan favorite, and was re-released in a special edition format with three bonus tracks in 2008.

== Musical style ==
Much of Long Division continued to have the ska and jam feeling of Shish Boom Bam, with songs such as "Fake Face" and "Colors of Discipline" essentially being straight ska songs and many other songs having heavy ska influences. However, the album also expanded the horizons of the band's sound further into the realms of rock and soul. Songs such as "Simple Song" and "Dig" were essentially rock songs, and "20 Years" was arguably the heaviest alternative song that they had yet released, a style that they would eventually pursue on 2001's ¡Viva Nueva!. The straight jam feeling of many of the songs of Shish Boom Bam was infused into the songs of Long Division with more of a funk and soul feeling, largely due to the addition of keyboard player Spencer Albee. Albee's keyboards gave the band much more of a soul feeling that the band had lacked before Long Division that soon came to largely define the band's sound.

== Legacy ==
Long Division remains a favorite among Rustic Overtones fans, despite not being widely available for nearly a decade. Several songs from the album were in WCYY's regular rotation, including "Simple Song", which topped the station's listener vote-based "top 5 at five" for months. Long Division is often seen as the band's "breakthrough" album that made them big in the Portland, Maine, local music scene, largely thanks to the large amount of airtime that "Simple Song" received. Prior to the breakup, many songs from the album were commonly found in their set lists. After the band reunited in 2007, songs from the album were less commonly played as the touring focused more on material from Rooms by the Hour, ¡Viva Nueva! and Light at the End, although songs such as "About a Kid", "Simple Song", "Long Division" and "Pop Trash" are still occasionally played.

Despite its importance as the band's breakthrough album and its popularity among the fans, until spring 2008 the band had not sold the album since the days of Rooms by the Hours, making the album nearly impossible to find. Occasional copies were found on websites such as eBay and Amazon.com, although they usually sold for high prices. Copies could also rarely be found at second-hand music stores across the northeast United States, especially in Maine and Massachusetts, where the band toured most during their original run.

== Track listing ==
1. "About a Kid"
2. "Simple Song"
3. "Spunk Drive 185"
4. "Colors of Discipline"
5. "20 Years"
6. "Fake Face"
7. "Dig"
8. "Feel"
9. "Pimp"
10. "Long Division"
11. "Slowly"
12. "Outlaw Biker"
13. "Pop Trash"

=== 2008 Deluxe Edition bonus tracks ===
14. "Red Afternoon"
15. "Redemption Pays"
16. "Let Me Grabbitz"

== 2008 re-release ==
Artwork for Long Division re-release

On November 15, 2007, the band announced in a teaser trailer on Myspace that they were to re-release the album for the holiday season. The trailer, whose main purpose was to announce a Rustic Overtones documentary/live DVD to be released in spring 2008, featured the song "About a Kid" from the album. On November 24, 2007, the band announced to the crowd at a show at Portland club The Asylum that the album was to be re-released on the band's new record label, and that the re-issue would contain outtakes from the original album sessions. Due to delays, the album was not re-released until March 19, 2007, independently and not on the band's new label as previously announced. This new deluxe edition features old and new artwork by Patrick Corrigan on cardboard packaging that includes an essay by drummer Tony McNaboe as a fold-out insert. The new release's bonus tracks include "Red Afternoon", which was toured during the band's original run, "Redemption Pays" and "Let Me Grabbitz", which was originally known to fans as "The Secret Song". This 2008 re-release was mastered by Scott Elson.

== Personnel ==
- Dave Gutter - lead vocals, guitar, lyrics
- "Captain Beautiful" (Spencer Albee) - keyboards, piano, backing vocals
- Tony McNaboe - drums, backing vocals
- Jon Roods - bass, backing vocals
- Ryan Zoidis - alto saxophone, backing vocals
- Jason Ward - baritone saxophone, backing vocals, lyrics on "Pimp"
- Pete Giordano - additional vocals on "About a Kid"
- Brant Dadaleares - guest vocals on "20 Years"
- Paul Chamberlain - guest trumpet on "20 Years"
- Steve Marquis - guest guitar on "20 Years"
- Matt Staples - guest percussion on "20 Years"
- Colin Decker - producer, engineer, mixer
- Jonathan Wyman - mastering
- Scott Elson - mastering (2008 re-release)
- Susan Morrow - band photos
- Patrick Corrigan - album artwork and design
- O Brian Lawrence - album design
