= Nothing to Lose =

Nothing to Lose or Nothin' to Lose may refer to:

== Film and television ==
- Nothing to Lose (1995 film), or Ten Benny, an American film directed by Eric Bross
- Nothing to Lose (1997 film), an American comedy directed by Steve Oedekerk
- Nothing to Lose (2002 film), a Thai crime film directed by Danny Pang
- Nothing to Lose (2008 film), a Dutch film directed by Pieter Kuijpers
- Nothing to Lose (TV series) or Judge vs. Judge, a 2017–2018 South Korean series
- "Nothing to Lose" (CSI: Miami), a television episode

== Literature ==
- Nothing to Lose (novel), a 2008 Jack Reacher novel by Lee Child
- Nothing to Lose, a 2004 young-adult novel by Alex Flinn
- Nothing to Lose, a 2007 young-adult novel by Norah McClintock

== Music ==
=== Albums ===
- Nothing to Lose (Daniel Schuhmacher album), 2010
- Nothing to Lose (Eddie Money album), 1988
- Nothing to Lose (Emblem3 album) or the title song, 2013
- Nothing to Lose (Forty Deuce album) or the title song, 2005
- Nothing to Lose (Michael Learns to Rock album) or the title song, 1997
- Nothing to Lose (Sanctus Real album) or the title song, 2001
- Nothing to Lose (soundtrack) or the Naughty by Nature title song, "Nothin' to Lose", from the 1997 film
- Nothing to Lose, by Carpathian, 2006
- Nothing to Lose, by Hollow Coves, 2024
- Nothing to Lose, by Rebecca, 1984

=== Songs ===
- "Nothing to Lose" (Billy Talent song), 2004
- "Nothing to Lose" (Bret Michaels song), 2010
- "Nothin' to Lose" (Kiss song), 1974
- "Nothin' to Lose" (Marcel song), 2002; also recorded by Josh Gracin in 2004
- "Nothing to Lose" (Operator song), 2008
- "Nothing to Lose" (Vassy song), 2016
- "Nothing to Lose", by 2Pac from R U Still Down? (Remember Me), 1997
- "Nothin' to Lose", by Arcade from Arcade, 1993
- "Nothing to Lose", by Claudine Longet from the film The Party, 1968
- "Nothing to Lose", by Dragon from Dreams of Ordinary Men, 1986
- "Nothing to Lose", by Jackson Yee, 2017
- "Nothing to Lose", by Kylie Minogue from Enjoy Yourself, 1989
- "Nothing to Lose", by S'Express from Intercourse, 1991

== See also ==
- Nothing Left to Lose (disambiguation)
