= Shish Boom Bam =

Studio album by Rustic Overtones
- Released: 1994
- Recorded: Big Sound Studios, Westbrook, Maine
- Genre: Rock, jazz, soul, funk, ska
- Length: 54:11
- Label: Ripcord Records / Beezo Records; RR73828
- Producer: Rustic Overtones (Co-produced by Joe Brien)

Rustic Overtones chronology
Shish Boom Bam (1994)	Long Division (1995)

Shish Boom Bam is an album by the Rustic Overtones, released in 1994 by Beezo Records / Ripcord Records. "Brand New Friend" and "Scarecrow" became immediate fan favorites.

== Track listing ==
1. "Head First"
2. "Three O'Clock"
3. "Brand New Friend"
4. "Bad Truth"
5. "88"
6. "Fine"
7. "Ride"
8. "Fishin' in a Bucket"
9. "Colostomy"
10. "Freddie Had a Lady"
11. "One Strongest Will"
12. "Scarecrow"
13. "Juice"
