= Relentlessly Yours =

Studio album by Spencer Albee
- Released: May 16, 2017
- Genre: Rock, Pop rock
- Length: 37:37

Spencer Albee chronology
Mistakes Were Made (2015)	Relentlessly Yours (2017)

Relentlessly Yours is the third solo album and sixteenth studio album release overall by Spencer Albee. The album was released in stores on May 16, 2017, with a release party at Port City Music Hall on June 2, 2017. A limited edition compilation EP featuring four unreleased B-side tracks from the Mistakes Were Made recording sessions was released on April 22, 2017.

== Track listing ==
1. "Just Like Clockwork" - 2:40
2. "Nothing Left to Lose" - 3:02
3. "Feeling Lucky" - 3:45
4. "Instrumental Breakdown" - 4:18
5. "You'll Be the Death of Me" - 3:23
6. "All Is Quiet on the Western Prom" - 3:14
7. "You Swept Me off My Feet" - 3:14
8. "Miss U2" - 2:27
9. "Too Much" - 3:57
10. "Open Heart" - 4:27
11. "Ten to One" - 3:10
