= Love Is Not Enough (Spencer Albee EP) =

EP by Spencer Albee
- Released: November 25, 2014
- Genre: Rock; pop
- Length: 13:40
- Producer: Steve Drown

Spencer Albee chronology
Signature Half-Step a Retrospective 2000-2014 (2014)	Love Is Not Enough (2014)	Mistakes Were Made (2015)

Professional ratings
Review scores
Source	Rating
Rolling Stone	(positive) link

Love Is Not Enough is an EP by Spencer Albee. It was released on November 25, 2014.

== Track listing ==
1. "One 2 Three" – 4:32
2. "I Don't Know" – 2:58
3. "Love Is Not Enough" – 3:40
4. "Get Out the State" – 2:50
5. "So Long" – 2:30
