= Open Letter to the Damned =

Open Letter To The Damned

Studio album by As Fast As
- Released: 2004 (Original); May 23, 2006 (Re-release)
- Recorded: January 2005 – March 2006 (Re-release)
- Genre: Power pop
- Length: 54:49 (Original); 42:25 (Re-release)
- Label: Octone(Re-release)
- Producer: Jonathon Wyman, Spencer Albee, Matt Wallace, Howard Benson, David Kahne

As Fast As chronology
Something Fierce (2003)	Open Letter To The Damned (2004)	Destroy the Plastique Man (2008)

Original cover
- Cover of the 2004 independent release.

Professional ratings
Review scores
Source	Rating
Allmusic	4.5/5 stars
AbsolutePunk	8.8/10
Sputnikmusic	4.5/5

Open Letter to the Damned is the first album by As Fast As after changing their name from Rocktopus. It was released in 2006 by Octone Records and is a reworking of their 2004 independently released album of the same name.

== Track listing ==
1. "Blame It on the Drugs" – 3:01
2. "Florida Sunshine" – 3:29
3. "Special" – 3:16
4. "Gretchen My Captain" – 3:43
5. "This Time" – 3:36
6. "Wasted Youth" – 4:14
7. "Open Letter to the Damned" – 3:52
8. "Skin the Kat" – 4:56
9. "If I Only Knew" – 3:42
10. "This Is Real" – 4:53
11. "Something Fierce" – 3:39

== 2004 independent release ==
1. "This is Real" – 4:16
2. "Gretchen My Captain" – 3:46
3. "This Time" – 3:27
4. "Sandalz 4 Shoes" – 3:00
5. "Jenny Better" – 3:19
6. "All These Words" – 2:52
7. "Need A Light?" – 0:53
8. "Wasted Youth" – 3:12
9. "Open Letter to the Damned" – 4:46
10. "Technicolor Love" – 2:32
11. "Thinking About You" – 1:15
12. "Vulnerable" - 3:52
13. "At Least I Tasted Love" - 4:38
14. "Stuck Here With You" - 4:27
15. "Bury Me" - 4:09
16. "This Is Real Reprise" - 1:03
17. "Until September" - 3:22
