= Preposterously Dank =

Studio album by Spose
- Released: April 22, 2008
- Recorded: 2006–2007
- Studios: Small World (Wells, Maine)
- Genres: Hip-hop; alternative hip-hop; comedy hip-hop
- Length: 48:45
- Label: Frothy Four Records
- Producers: Spose; Eric Dahms; Grey Leaf; Jim Brown

Spose chronology
Preposterously Dank (2008)	We Smoked It All (2009)

Preposterously Dank is the first self-released solo debut studio album by American rapper Spose, released on April 22, 2008. The album was released under Frothy Four Records (Spose's record label).

== Production ==
The album was recorded at Small World in Wells, Maine. Eric Dahms produced 5 tracks on the album, while Spose produced 4, Grey Leaf and Jim Brown each produced 2. In 2010 the album was released through iTunes with two exclusive songs, "It's Alright With Me" "Preposterously Dank (Live At The Big Easy)".

== Track listing ==
Preposterously Dank track listing
No.	Title	Length
1.	"Preposterously Dank"	3:32
2.	"Fuck It"	4:50
3.	"John Madden" (featuring Cam Groves)	3:50
4.	"Drugs, Girls, Money, Liquor"	4:10
5.	"Gobble A Dank"	4:15
6.	"Under Control"	3:40
7.	"God Damn"	5:29
8.	"Just An Emcee II"	3:36
9.	"To The Head"	3:21
10.	"That's That"	4:20
11.	"Outro" (includes hidden acoustic version of "Drugs, Girls, Money, Liquor")	7:22

iTunes bonus tracks
No.	Title	Length
12.	"It's Alright With Me"	3:35
13.	"Preposterously Dank (Live At The Big Easy)"	4:37

== Credits ==
- Mixed by: Eric Dahms, Jim Brown
- Recorded by: Jim Brown
- Producer: Eric Dahms (tracks: 1, 2, 3, 5, 10), Grey Leaf (tracks: 6, 7), Jim Brown (tracks: 8, 11), Spose (tracks: 4, 5, 9, 10)
- Lyrics by: Spose

== See also ==
- 2008 in music
- Underground hip-hop
