= As Fast As =

American band

- Origin: Portland, Maine, United States
- Genres: Alternative rock, power pop
- Years active: 2003–present
- Labels: A&M Octone; Universal Music Group
- Members: Spencer Albee; Haché Horchatta; Zach Jones; Andrew Hodgkins
- Website: Official MySpace; Octone Records; PureVolume; Allmusic

As Fast As, formerly known as Rocktopus, is an alternative rock/power pop band from Portland, Maine, USA which formed in 2001. The band was formed as Rocktopus and released two albums under that name before changing their name to As Fast As.

The band consists of vocalist and keyboardist Spencer Albee (formerly of Rustic Overtones), bassist Haché Horchatta, guitarist Zach Jones and drummer Andrew Hodgkins.

Their first album, Open Letter to the Damned, was released on Octone Records in May 2006 and features the single "Florida Sunshine". The song was played on an episode of CSI: Miami, as well as in the promotional advertisements for the series. As Fast As left Octone Records due to "a difference in creative vision". On March 11, 2008, the band released Destroy the Plastique Man independently. The band stopped playing in August 2008, but despite Albee being busy with his new project Spencer and the School Spirit Mafia, the band reformed for a one-off concert at The Asylum in Portland on July 18, 2009, and released a new album, AFA For Effort, on June 23.

== Discography ==
=== Albums ===
Year	Title	Label
2002	I Love You! Good Morning! (as Rocktopus)	self-released
2003	Something Fierce (as Rocktopus)	FPFC Productions
2004	Open Letter to the Damned (2004)	FPFC Productions
2005	Hunt and Peck Acoustic EP	Octone Records
2006	Open Letter to the Damned (New release on different label with different tracks)	Octone Records
2008	Destroy the Plastique Man	Independent
2009	AFA For Effort	Independent

=== Singles ===
Song title	Album
"Vacation"	Something Fierce (as Rocktopus)
"Florida Sunshine"	Open Letter To The Damned
