= Paranoid Social Club =

American rock band

- Also known as: PSC
- Origin: Portland, Maine, United States
- Genres: Rock, alternative rock, punk rock, Indie, psychedelic rock
- Years active: 2002–present
- Label: ON Entertainment
- Members: Dave Gutter; Jon Roods; Trent Gay; Craig Sala
- Past members: Marc Boisvert; Tony McNaboe
- Website: http://www.pscmusic.com

Paranoid Social Club is an American rock band formed in 2002 in Portland, Maine, which plays a fusion of indie and psychedelic rock. Critics have noted of the band: "Dave Gutter's got one of the most versatile, likable rock voices in the game," and likened the sound to "...an artful combination of raw power and delicate melody."

== History ==
=== Early ===
Dave Gutter and Jon Roods have been writing songs together since they were 12 years old. The two went on to form Rustic Overtones, and formed PSC after the original demise of Rustic Overtones in 2002. The recurring "Axis" theme in the band's album titles began as a joke that tied in nicely with band's name. PSC's debut release, Axis II refers to personality disorders, including paranoia. The theme continued when the band released the double album Axis I & III, with Axis I disorders dealing with clinical syndromes and Axis III disorders being acute physical conditions. Axis IV disorders are brought on by direct physical and environmental factors. The songs on each album loosely follow the themes indicated by their titles.

=== Lineup Changes ===
Marc Boisvert filled in on drums for Rustic Overtones in early 2002, while regular drummer Tony McNaboe took a break from Rustic to pursue other projects. When Rustic originally disbanded in 2002, Boisvert joined Gutter and Roods in PSC, but after Rustic Overtones reunited in 2007 McNaboe replaced Boisvert as the drummer for Paranoid Social Club. Well-known Portland guitarist/vocalist Trent Gay joined the group in 2010. During the December 18, 2010 Paranoid Social Club performance at Putnam Den in Saratoga Springs, NY Dave Gutter made an announcement that it would be drummer Tony McNaboe's final show with the band. Craig Sala stepped in as PSC's full-time drummer in early 2011.

== Members ==
=== Current ===
- Dave Gutter - vocals, guitar (2002–present)
- Jon Roods - bass, keyboards (2002–present)
- Trent Gay - guitar, vocals (2010–present)
- Craig Sala - drums (2011–present)

=== Past ===
- Tony McNaboe (2007–2010) – drums
- Marc Boisvert (2002-2007) - drums
- dj shAde (2002) - (Turntables | MPC2000 XL)

== Discography ==
=== Studio albums ===
- Axis II (2002)
- Axis III & I (2004)
- Paranoid Social Club (2005)
- Axis IV (2011)

=== Collaborations ===
- White Trash (single) feat. Thommy (2010)
