= Something Fierce (album) =

Studio album by Rocktopus
- Released: April 1, 2003
- Genre: Rock
- Length: 50:42
- Label: FPFC Productions
- Producer: Spencer Albee; Steve Drown

Rocktopus chronology
| I Love You! Good Morning! (2002) | Something Fierce (2003) | Open Letter to the Damned (2006) |

Something Fierce is the second album by Rocktopus, produced by Spencer Albee and Steve Drown, and released in 2003. The songs "Vacation" and "Something Fierce" received airplay on New England rock radio stations such as WFNX.

This was the last studio album released by Rocktopus before changing the band's name to As Fast As.

== Reception ==
Paul Verna, reviewing the album for Billboard, called the album's sound "as original as it is compelling", and described it as revelling "in the pop-art craft of the Brian Wilsons and Harry Nilssons while also bowing at the altar of late-'70s-era power pop". Allmusic writer Daphne Carr gave the album two and a half stars out of five, describing it as combining "big power pop guitars with bizarrely childish lyrics for a sonically diverse yet immature effort".

== Track listing ==
1. "Vacation" – 4:29
2. "Little Miss Used" – 3:52
3. "Saturday Night" – 3:40
4. "Forevermore" – 3:33
5. "Get Away" – 3:32
6. "Something Fierce" – 3:48
7. "Suit & Tie" – 4:26
8. "Leaving Town" – 4:16
9. "25" – 3:13
10. "Soak in the Sun" – 4:15
11. "Killer" – 3:28
12. "2 Feet" - 3:49
13. "Down & Out" - 4:13
