= Seekonk (band) =

Musical band

- Origin: Portland, Maine, USA
- Genres: Indie rock, Slowcore
- Years active: 2002 – 2009
- Labels: North East Indie Records (US, Tongue Master Records (UK)], Kimchee Records
- Past members: Patrick Corrigan; Todd Hutchisen; Jason Ingalls; Dave Noyes; Sarah Ramey; Chris Burns; Greg Murphy
- Website: www.seekonkmusic.com

Seekonk is a slowcore band formed in Portland, Maine in the winter of 2002. The band played its first shows as a quartet consisting of Patrick Corrigan (guitar, drums, vocals, vibraphone, keyboards), Dave Noyes (guitar, keyboards, vocals, cello, trombone) Shana Barry (lead vocals, theremin, keyboards) and Greg Murphy (drums).

== Music ==
Shortly after the release of For Barbara Lee, Barry left the band and was replaced as lead singer by Sarah Ramey. This new line-up recorded Pinkwood in 2005, which was released the following year by Portland's North East Indie Records . Chris Burns joined the band in April 2006 for the ensuing US tour, playing bass, vibraphone and percussion. The last album recorded before they disbanded, Nice Wheelz, has never been released, though a vinyl release titled Pinkwood 2 was issued in 2010.

== Members ==
- Patrick Corrigan (guitar, vocals, drums, vibraphone, keyboards) 2002-2007
- Dave Noyes (guitar, keyboards, vocals, cello, trombone) 2002-2007
- Shana Barry (lead vocals, theremin, keyboards) 2002-2003
- Jason Ingalls (drums, percussion, Vibraphone, Mandolin) 2002-2007
- Todd Hutchisen (Guitar, vocals, steel guitar, Vibraphone, keyboards) 2002-2007
- Sarah Ramey (vocals) 2003-2007
- Chris Burns (bass, vibraphone and percussion) 2006-2007
- Greg Murphy (drums) 2002

== Discography ==
=== Albums ===
- For Barbara Lee (2003, Kimchee Records [KC 029 CD])
- Pinkwood (2006, North East Indie Records (US) [NEI 43 CD/LP] / Tongue Master Records (UK) [TMAST 006 CD])
- Pinkwood 2 (2010, Burst & Bloom Records)

=== Compilations ===
- Greetings From Area Code 207, Vol. 4 (2003, Cornmeal Records [CMEAL 2074 CD]) track: "Maps of Egypt"
- Greetings From Area Code 207, Vol. 6 (2005, Cornmeal Records [CMEAL 2076 CD]) track: "Love"
- Greetings From Area Code 207, Vol. 7 (2008, Cornmeal Records [CMEAL 2077 CD]) track: "Waking"
- The Deafening Silence of a Very Bright Light [soundtrack] (2008, Bright Orange Turntable Productions) track: "The Great Compromise"
