= Bull Moose Music =

Independent record store chain based in Portland, Maine, USA

Bull Moose (Retail)
- Bull Moose Logo
- Formerly: Bull Moose Music
- Industry: Retail
- Founded: 1989 (37 years ago)
- Founder: Brett Wickard (Board Chair)
- Headquarters: Portland, Maine
- Number of locations: 10
- Products: Physical media for music, movies, video games, and books
- Website: bullmoose.com

Bull Moose is an independent retailer and record store chain based in Portland, Maine, United States. The chain has operated since 1989, and has seven locations in Maine and three in New Hampshire.

== History ==
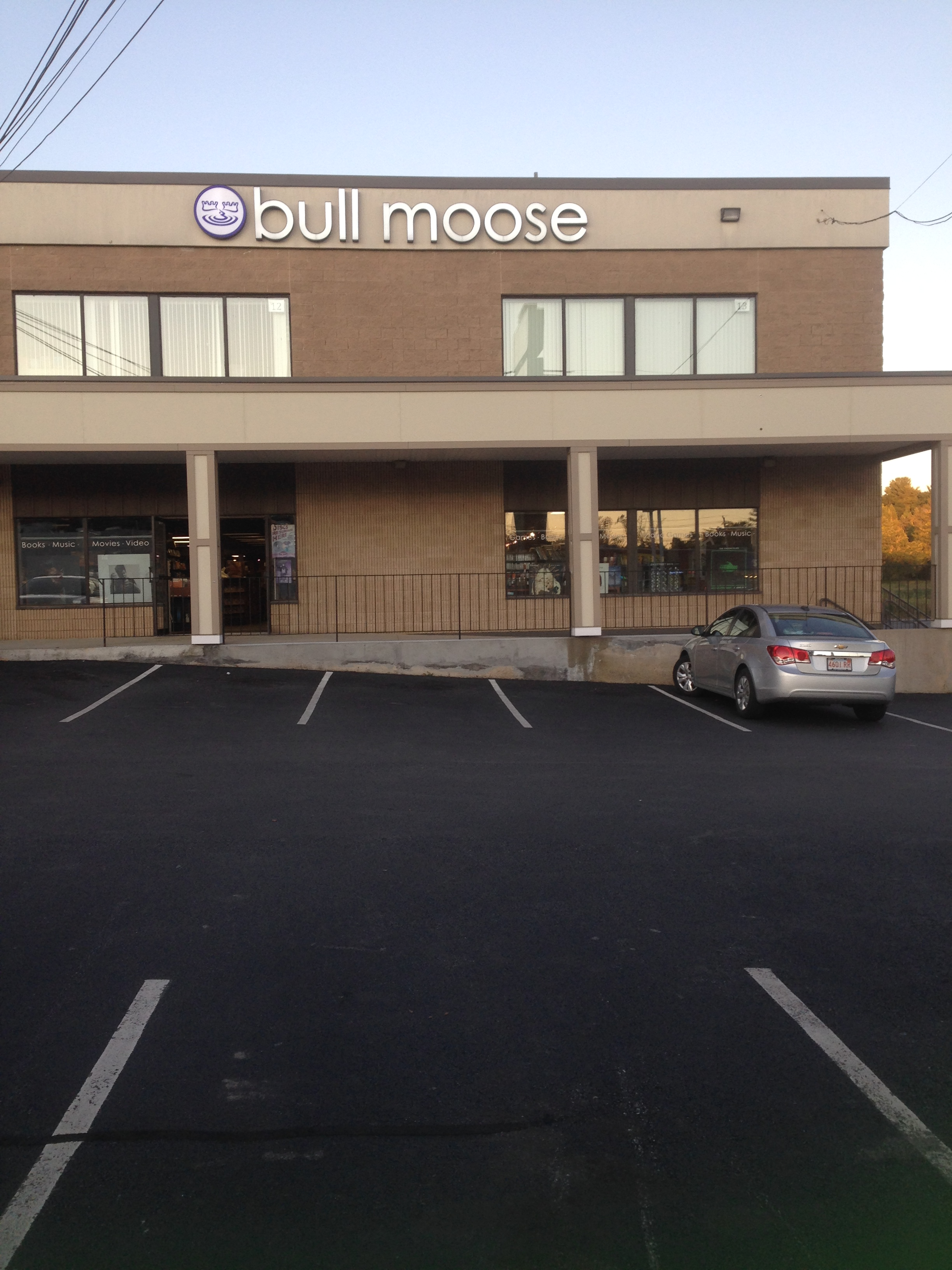
A Bull Moose store located in Salem, New Hampshire, which closed in 2024.

Bull Moose was founded by Brett Wickard in Brunswick, Maine, in 1989, though he did not file it as a business corporation until 1995. Bull Moose was started with $37,000. Chris Brown was hired in 1991 as a clerk and later became the creator of Record Store Day and the company's vice-president.

It was covered by Bloomberg for using predictive algorithms to drive media sales.

On January 4, 2022, it was announced that Bull Moose would be sold to its 140 employees. Founder Brett Wickard stayed on as interim CEO and chair of the board during the transition. In January 2022, Bull Moose became 100% employee-owned and created an employee stock-ownership plan for its over 170 employees across its eleven stores.

In May 2022, Bull Moose named Shawn Nichols as its new president and CEO, with Wickard remaining on as chairman.

In December 2022, it was announced that Bull Moose's Sanford, Maine, location would be closing after 25 years and that a new location would be opened in Biddeford. The new store opened in early 2023. The store in Salem, New Hampshire also closed and relocated, replaced with a new location in Plaistow.

As of 2026, Bull Moose has ten locations, having closed two stores over the previous ten years. In November 2020, the Portland store, which had been located in the Old Port, closed. In January 2026, the North Windham store closed as well.

== Record Store Day ==
In 2007, when Brown was head of Bull Moose marketing, an email chain with Michael Kurtz, head of the Department of Record Stores, sparked the idea for Record Store Day. Each year, the co-founders at the Department of Record Stores collaborate with multiple artists for exclusive releases made especially for Record Store Day. The releases for 2017 included works from David Bowie, Prince and St. Vincent. The Department of Record Stores keeps a list of participating independent record stores.

== LEGO Fire Walk ==
The Bull Moose Facebook account posted an image of a LEGO Fire Walk they created at the store in South Portland, Maine, to promote sales of The LEGO Movie on June 19, 2014. It was shared by Star Trek actor George Takei and subsequently went viral. It was also covered by local news.

== Music events ==
Bull Moose is locally known for their in-store music events, with musicians like The Decemberists, Mumford and Sons, and Wilco performing.

Bull Moose has hosted the following artists:

Artist	Date of Performance or Signing	Location	Noteworthy Information
The Dresden Dolls	Live Performance on February 6, 2005	Scarborough, Maine	
Regina Spektor	Live Performance on June 5, 2005	Scarborough, Maine	Spektor released a live EP of her performance in August 2005.
Click Five	Live Performance in early 2006	Scarborough, Maine	Click Five released a live EP of their performance in March 2006.
Rocco Deluca	Autograph Signing on July 16, 2006	Scarborough, Maine	Kiefer Sutherland attended to promote Deluca.
Amanda Palmer (of The Dresden Dolls)	Autograph Signing on September 17, 2008	Portland, Maine	
Disturbed	Autograph Signing on April 18, 2009	Portland, Maine	
Ani DiFranco	Live Performance on April 17, 2009	Scarborough, Maine	Ani DiFranco performed at 1pm. A live album, "Ani DiFranco/Live at Bull Moose 4-17-2009" was later self-released through DiFranco's Righteous Babe Records.
Killswitch Engage	Autograph Signing on April 17, 2009	Scarborough, Maine	Killswitch Engage signed autographs at 4pm
The Decemberists	Live Performance on January 30, 2011	Scarborough, Maine	The Decemberists released a live EP of their performance in March 2011.
Mumford & Sons	Live Performance on August 3, 2012	Scarborough, Maine	Mumford & Sons released a live EP of their performance in April 2013
Imagine Dragons	Live Performance on September 10, 2012	Scarborough, Maine	
John Densmore (of The Doors)	Autograph Signing on April 20, 2013	Scarborough, Maine	This was a launch for Densmore's book, The Doors: Unhinged and also an event to promote Record Store Day.
Mike Mills of R.E.M.	Autograph Signing on April 19, 2014	Scarborough, Maine	This was an autograph signing to promote Record Store Day.
Seether	Autograph Signing on May 9, 2014	Bangor	
Against Me!	Autograph Signing on July 27, 2014	Scarborough, Maine	
The String Cheese Incident	Live Performance on November 4, 2014	Scarborough, Maine	
Grace Potter	Autograph Signing on August 19, 2015	Scarborough, Maine	
Wilco	Live Performance on January 27, 2016	Scarborough	
Graham Nash	Live Performance on April 16, 2016	Scarborough, Maine	This was a concert to promote Record Store Day.
Gov't Mule	Live Performance on August 20, 2016	Scarborough, Maine	
All Time Low	Autograph Signing on September 3, 2016	Bangor, Maine	Bull Moose released a limited run free poster for people who attended this event.
Fozzy	Autograph Signing on April 7, 2018	Portland, Maine	
