= ¡Viva Nueva! =

Studio album by Rustic Overtones
- Released: June 5, 2001
- Genres: Rock, jazz, soul, funk, ska
- Labels: Tommy Boy/Warner Bros. 01471
- Producers: Tony Visconti, David Leonard and Rustic Overtones

Rustic Overtones chronology
Rooms by the Hour (1997)	¡Viva Nueva! (2001)	Light At The End (2007)

Professional ratings
Review scores
Source	Rating
Allmusic	3/5 stars

¡Viva Nueva! is the fourth album by the Rustic Overtones, released in 2001 before their highly publicized breakup a year later. With 16 tracks, the album has the most songs of any Rustic Overtones album to date. Tommy Boy Records distributed the album after relations soured between the Rustic Overtones and major label Arista Records. The group produced a (supposedly) million-dollar record with Arista, then found themselves in trouble with the label after playing an extraordinarily hardcore set. It is said that an Arista representative was heard to admonish the group, yelling "We thought you were going to be like the Dave Matthews Band!" The group claimed that they had made no such promise, and Arista allowed them to take the record with them when they left. This album was then given to Tommy Boy for release, with the approval of their fans. In December, 2009, the Portland Phoenix ranked ¡Viva Nueva! the tenth greatest local album of the decade, saying that, "The fact that the vagaries of the music business beat them back doesn't diminish its greatness," and called it "Maine's first real major-league rock album."

== Videos ==
The two singles from the disc were "C'mon" and "Combustible", and both had music videos made for them which were directed by Kurt St. Thomas. An open casting call, in the summer after the album was released, was advertised for filming of the new video. The go-kart racing portions were filmed in Amesbury, Massachusetts. Rumor has it that the video for "Combustible" had to be redesigned in the wake of the September 11 attacks, since a video showing things blowing up was deemed not to be in the band's best interests.

== Special guests ==
Guests on the album include Funkmaster Flex (track six), Imogen Heap (track 11) and David Bowie (tracks nine and 16).

== Track listing ==
1. "C'mon"
2. "Gas on Skin"
3. "Love Underground"
4. "Hardest Way Possible"
5. "Crash Landing"
6. "Smoke"
7. "Baby Blue"
8. "Revolution AM"
9. "Sector Z"
10. "Combustible"
11. "Valentine's Day Massacre"
12. "Hit Man"
13. "Check"
14. "Boys and Girls"
15. "Beekeeper"
16. "Man Without a Mouth"

== Personnel ==
- Dave Gutter – guitar, vocals
- Spencer Albee – synthesizers, vocals
- Tony McNaboe – drums
- Jon Roods – bass guitar
- Ryan Zoidis – saxophone, engineer
- Jason Ward – baritone saxophone
- Scott Pederson – guest trumpet
- David Bowie – guest vocals on "Sector Z" and "Man Without a Mouth"
- Funkmaster Flex – guest vocals on "Smoke"
- Imogen Heap – guest performer on "Valentine's Day Massacre"
- Tony Visconti – producer, engineer, bass (upright)
- David Leonard – producer, engineer, mixing
- Steve Drown – producer, engineer
- Roger Sommers – engineer
- Jim Begley – engineer
- Chris Mazer – assistant engineer
- Ryoji Hata – assistant engineer
- Alex Chan – assistant engineer
- John Goodmanson – mixing
- Shepard Fairey – art design
