= Rooms by the Hour =

Studio album by Rustic Overtones
- Released: January 20, 1998
- Recorded: Big Sound Studios, Westbrook, Maine
- Genre: Rock, jazz, soul, funk, ska
- Length: 48:57
- Label: Ripcord Records
- Producer: Lance Vardis

Rustic Overtones chronology
My Dirt (EP) (1996)	Rooms by the Hour (1998)	¡Viva Nueva! (2001)

Artwork for Rooms by the Hour re-release

Professional ratings
Review scores
Source	Rating
AllMusic	3/5 stars

Rooms by the Hour is an album by the American band Rustic Overtones, released in 1998. The album drew the attention of several major labels, leading to the band's contract with Arista Records.

== Critical reception ==
The Providence Journal thought that the band "blends fast-paced lyrics in a G. Love style and the instrumentation of a ska band—percussion, sax, another upright bass—to 'Feast or Famine'."

AllMusic wrote that the "energetic, horn-powered rock incorporates elements of jazz and R&B."

== Track listing ==
1. "Feast or Famine"
2. "Girl Germs"
3. "Check"
4. "The Letter"
5. "Hardest Way Possible"
6. "Kicking and Screaming"
7. "Pink Belly"
8. "Sugarcoat"
9. "The Heist"
10. "Machine Maker"
11. "History Crush"
12. "Shaker"
13. "Iron Boots"
14. "Outtro"

=== 2008 Deluxe Edition bonus tracks ===
15. "Cherry"
16. "Last Night's Band"
17. "Room 6"
